= Tony Award for Best Featured Actor in a Play =

American theatre award for Broadway actors

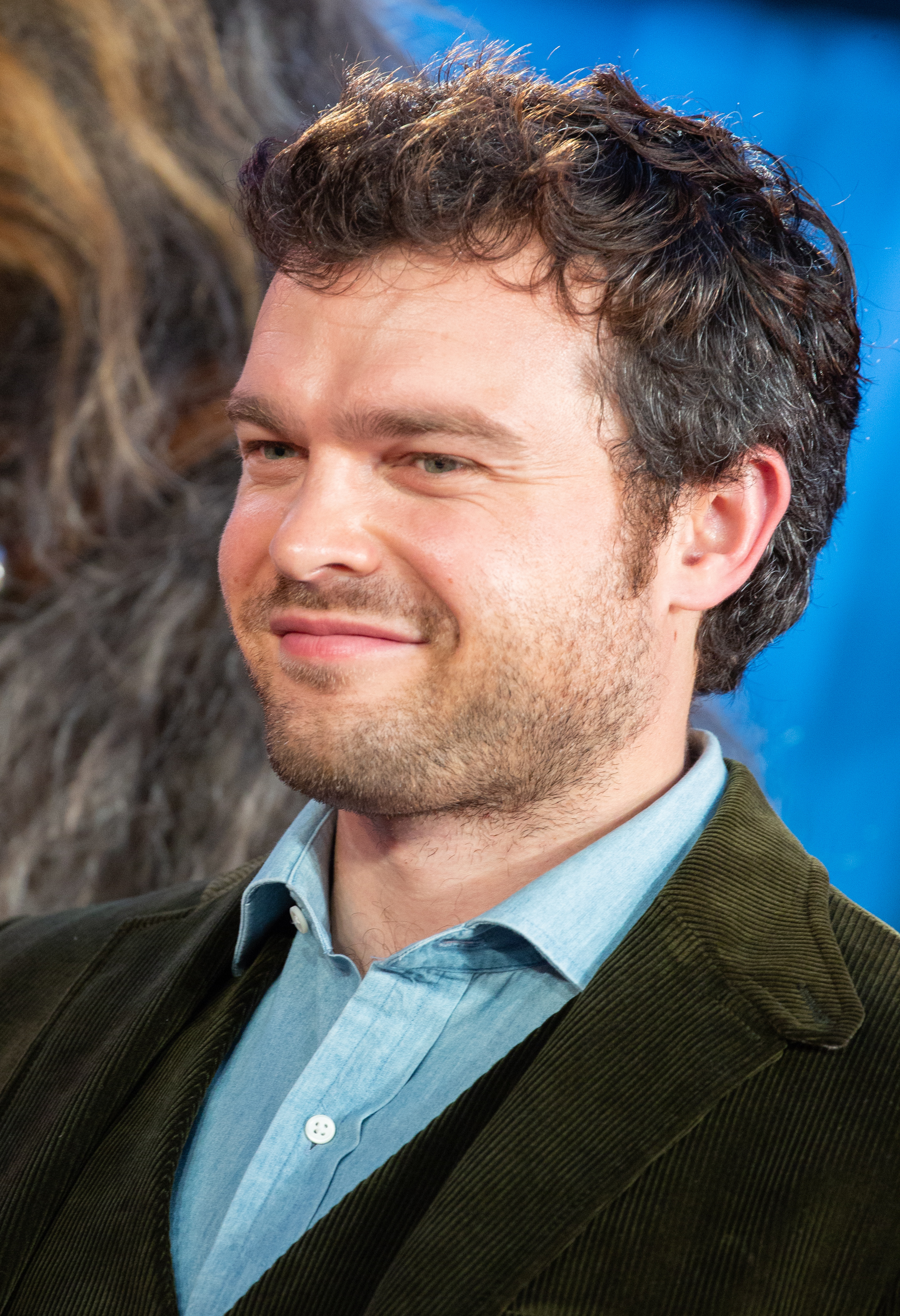
- 2026 recipient: Alden Ehrenreich
- Description: Best Performance by a Featured Actor in a Play
- Location: New York City
- Presented by: American Theatre Wing The Broadway League
- Currently held by: Alden Ehrenreich for Becky Shaw (2026)
- Website: TonyAwards.com

The Tony Award for Best Featured Actor in a Play is an honor presented at the Tony Awards, a ceremony established in 1947 as the Antoinette Perry Awards for Excellence in Theatre, to actors for quality supporting roles in a Broadway play. Honors in several categories are presented at the ceremony annually by the Tony Award Productions, a joint venture of The Broadway League and the American Theatre Wing, to "honor the best performances and stage productions of the previous year."

The award was originally called the Tony Award for Actor, Supporting or Featured (Dramatic). It was first presented to Arthur Kennedy at the 3rd Tony Awards for his portrayal of Biff Loman in Arthur Miller's Death of a Salesman. Before 1956, nominees' names were not made public; the change was made by the awards committee to "have a greater impact on theatregoers".

Frank Langella holds the record for having the most wins in this category, with a total of two; he is the only person to win the award more than once. Richard Roma in Glengarry Glen Ross, Phil Hogan in A Moon for the Misbegotten, and Mason Marzac in Take Me Out are the only characters to take the award multiple times, all winning twice.

== Winners and nominees ==
indicates the winner

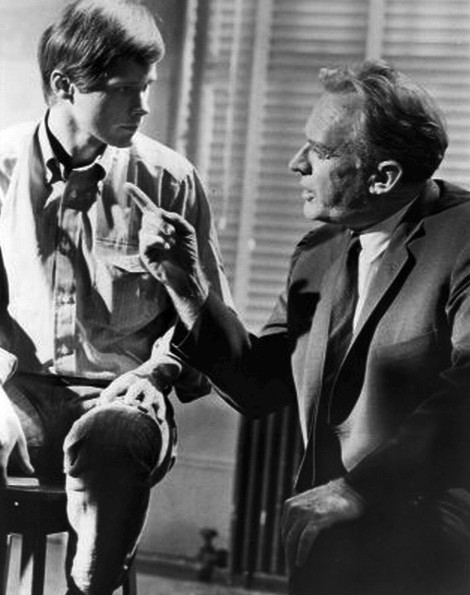
Arthur Kennedy won for Death of a Salesman (1949)

Eli Wallach won for The Rose Tattoo (1951)

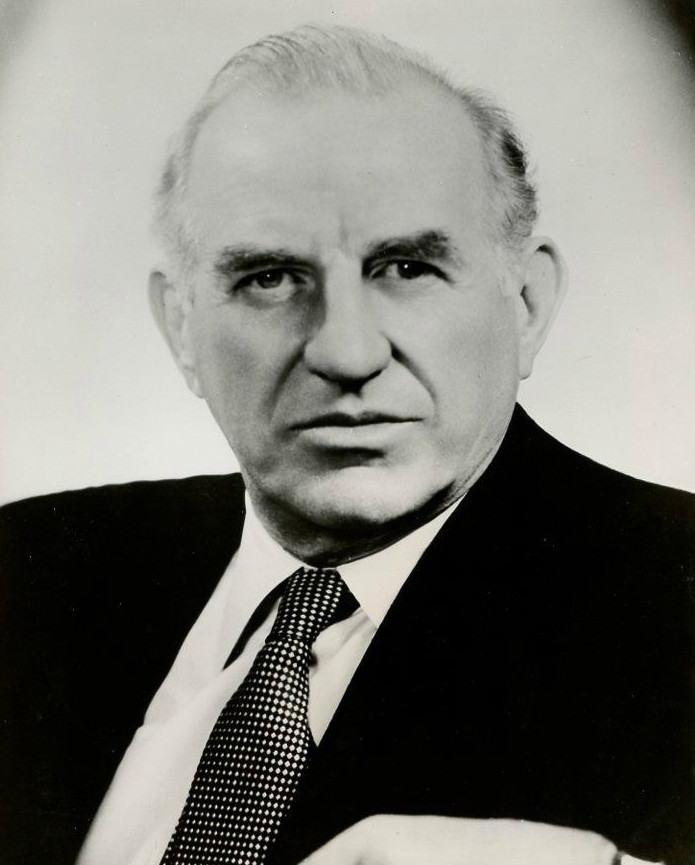
Ed Begley won for Inherit the Wind (1956)

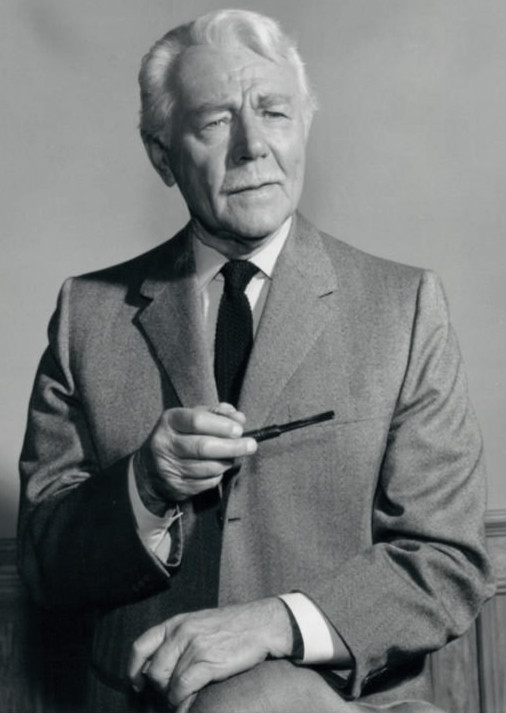
1959 award winner Charlie Ruggles

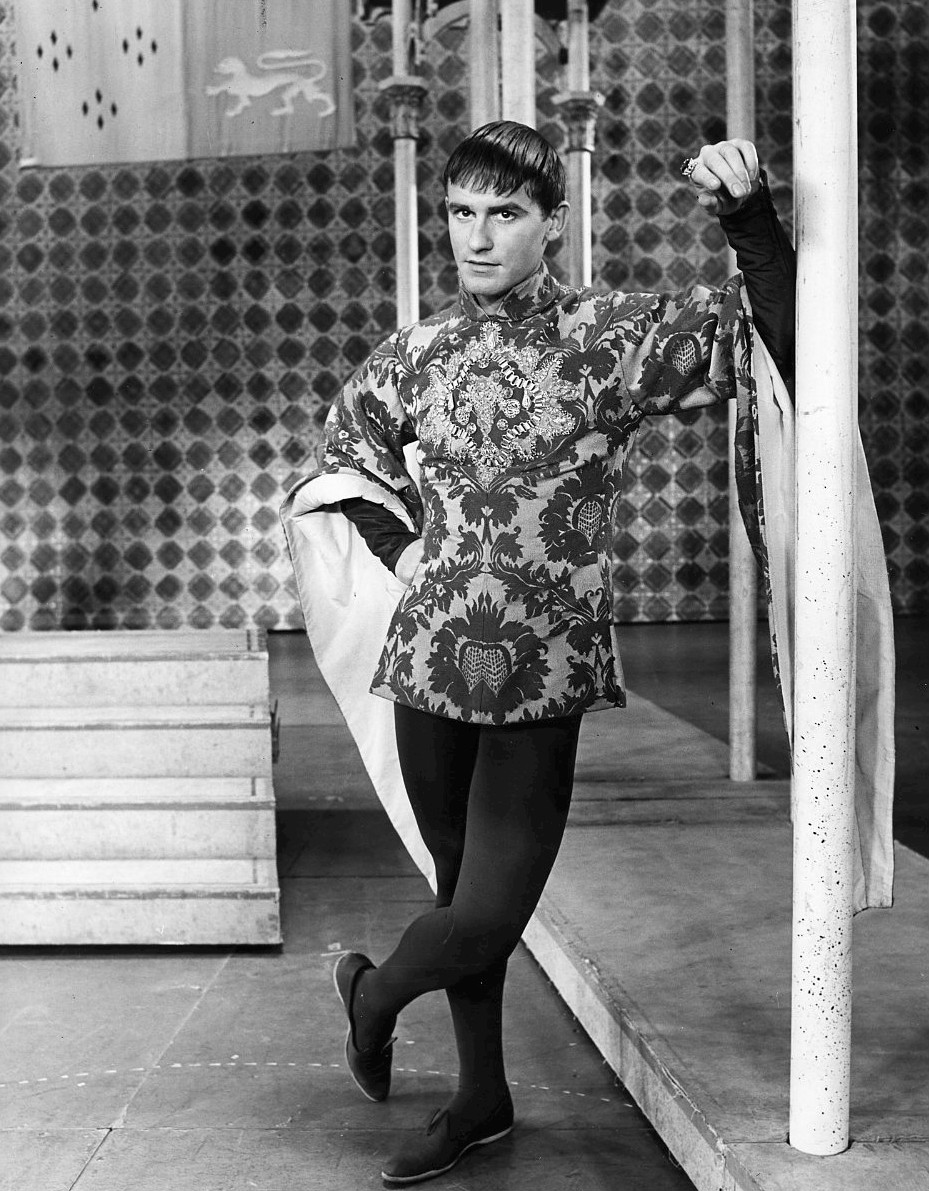
Roddy McDowall won for The Fighting Cock (1961)

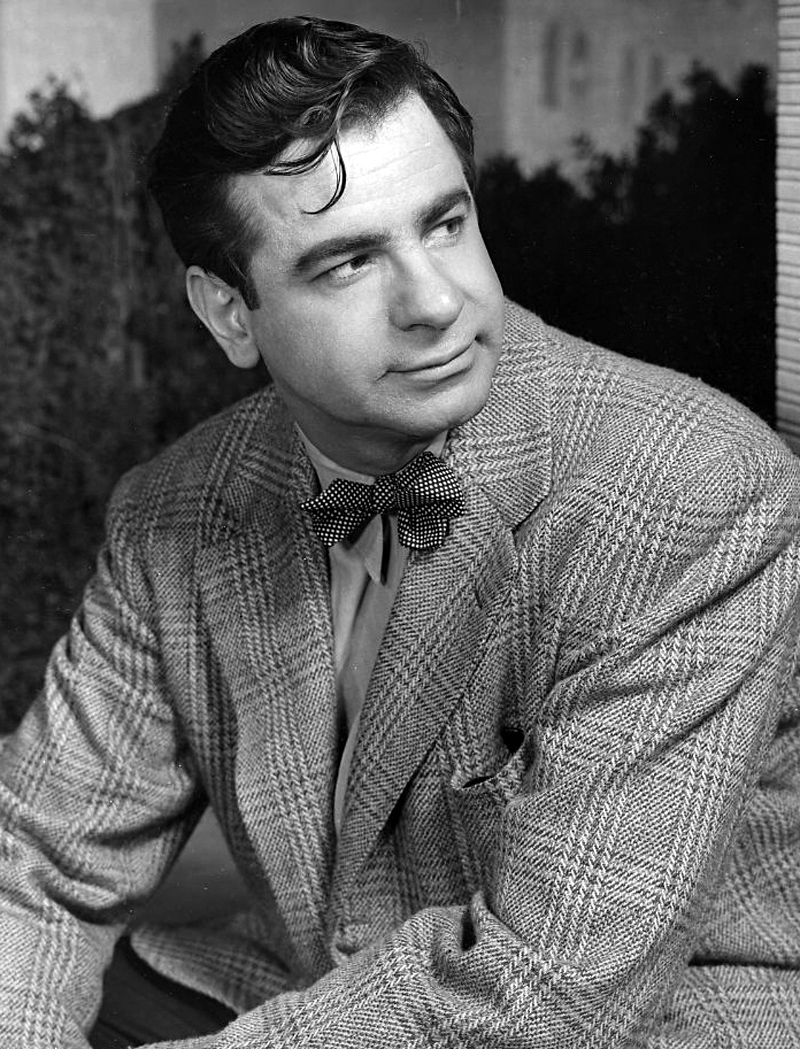
Walter Matthau won for A Shot in the Dark (1962)

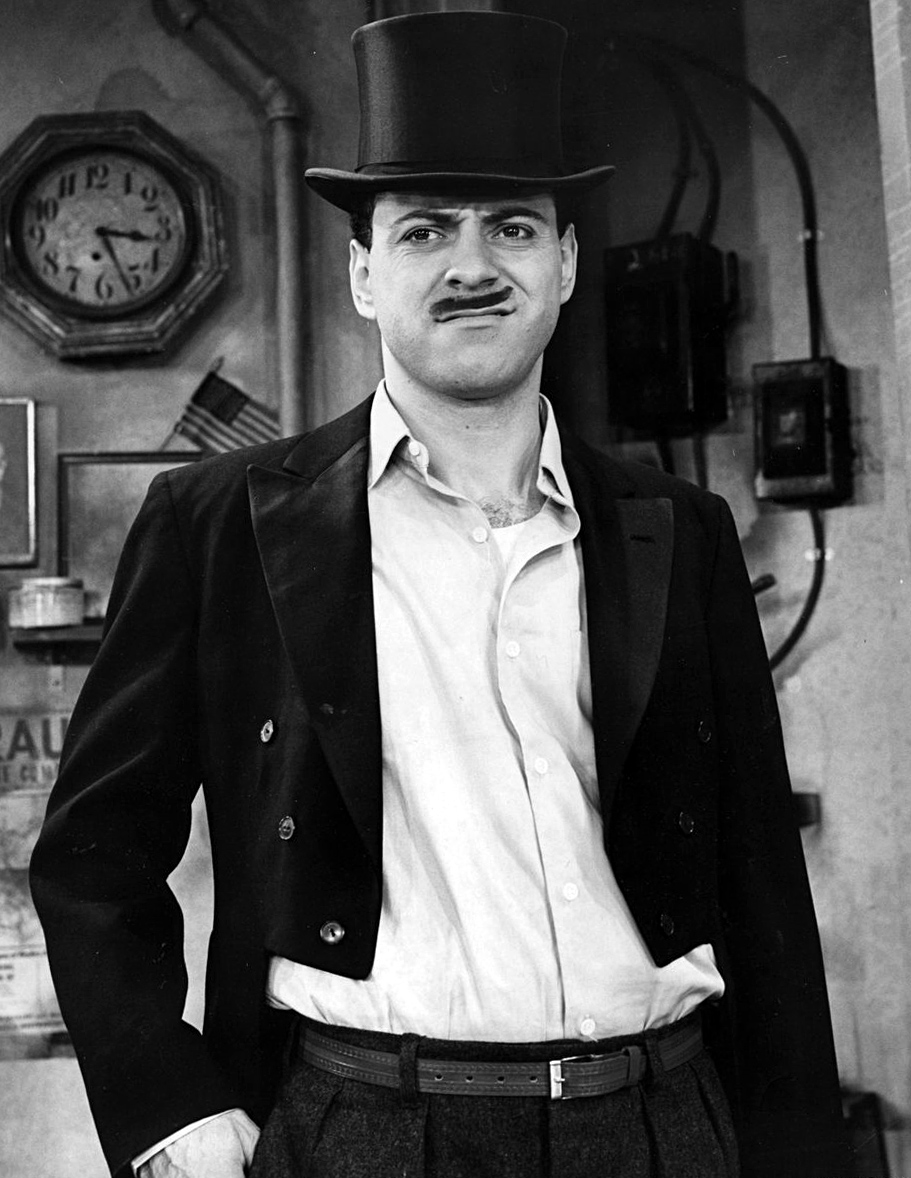
Alan Arkin won for Enter, Laughing (1963)

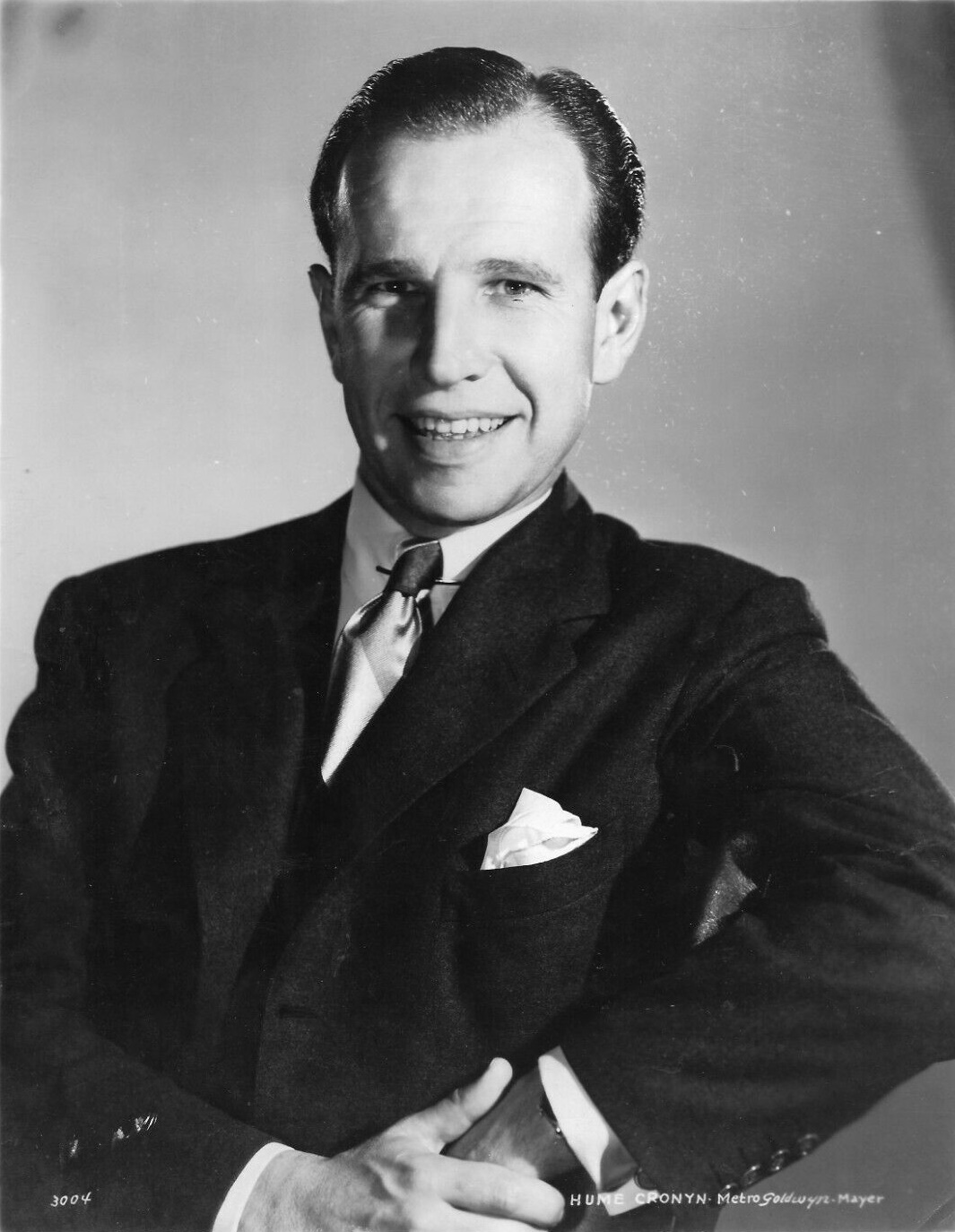
Hume Cronyn won for Hamlet (1964)

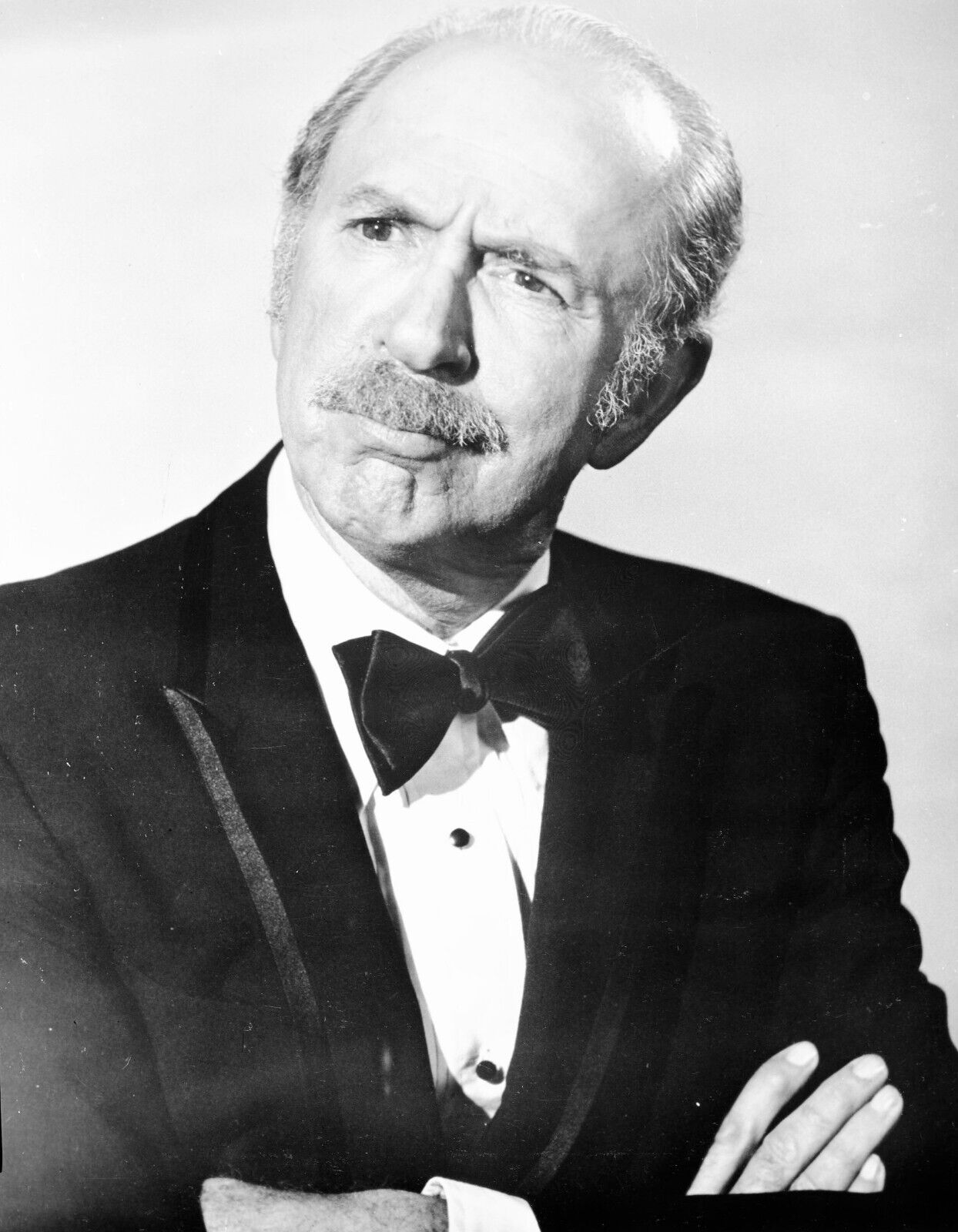
Jack Albertson won for The Subject was Roses (1965)

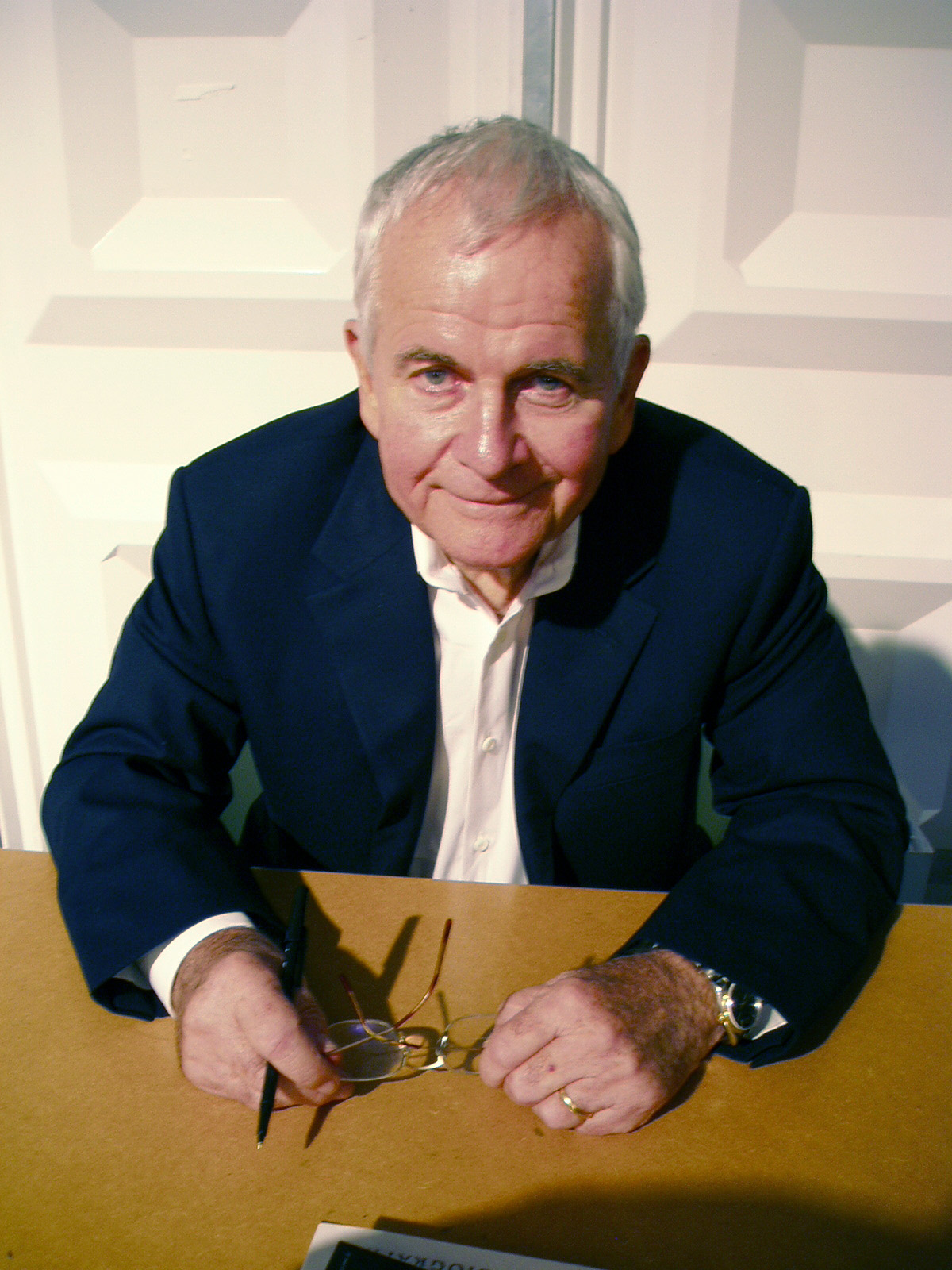
1967 award winner Ian Holm

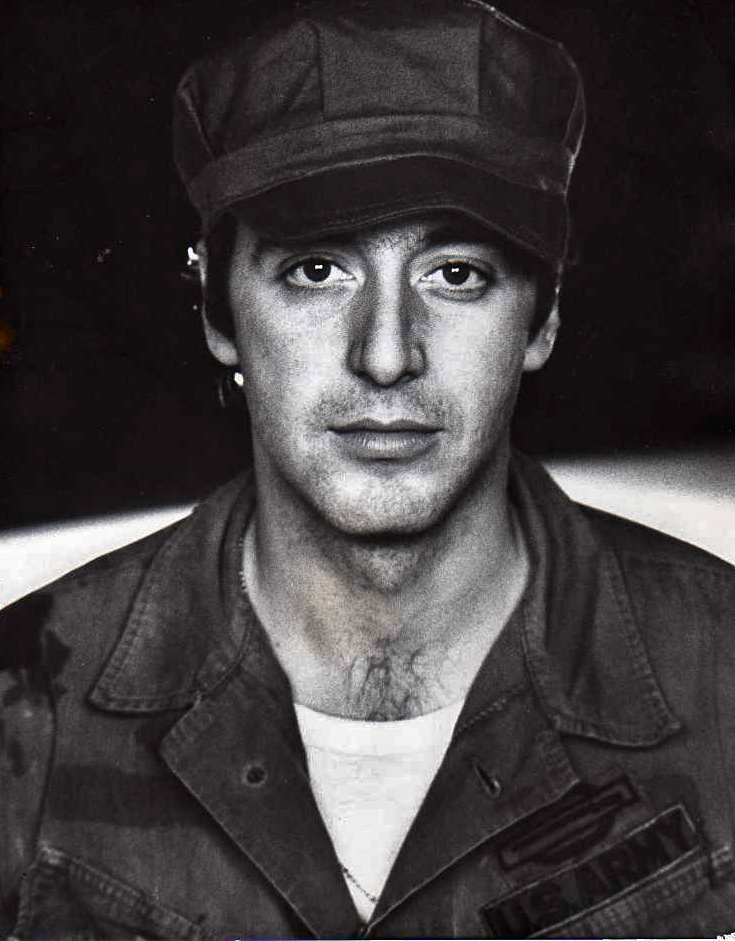
Al Pacino won for Does a Tiger Wear a Necktie? (1969)

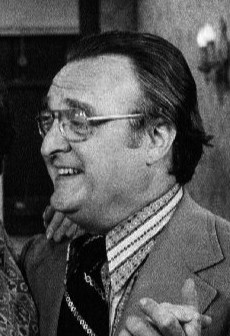
Vincent Gardenia won for The Prisoner of Second Avenue (1972)

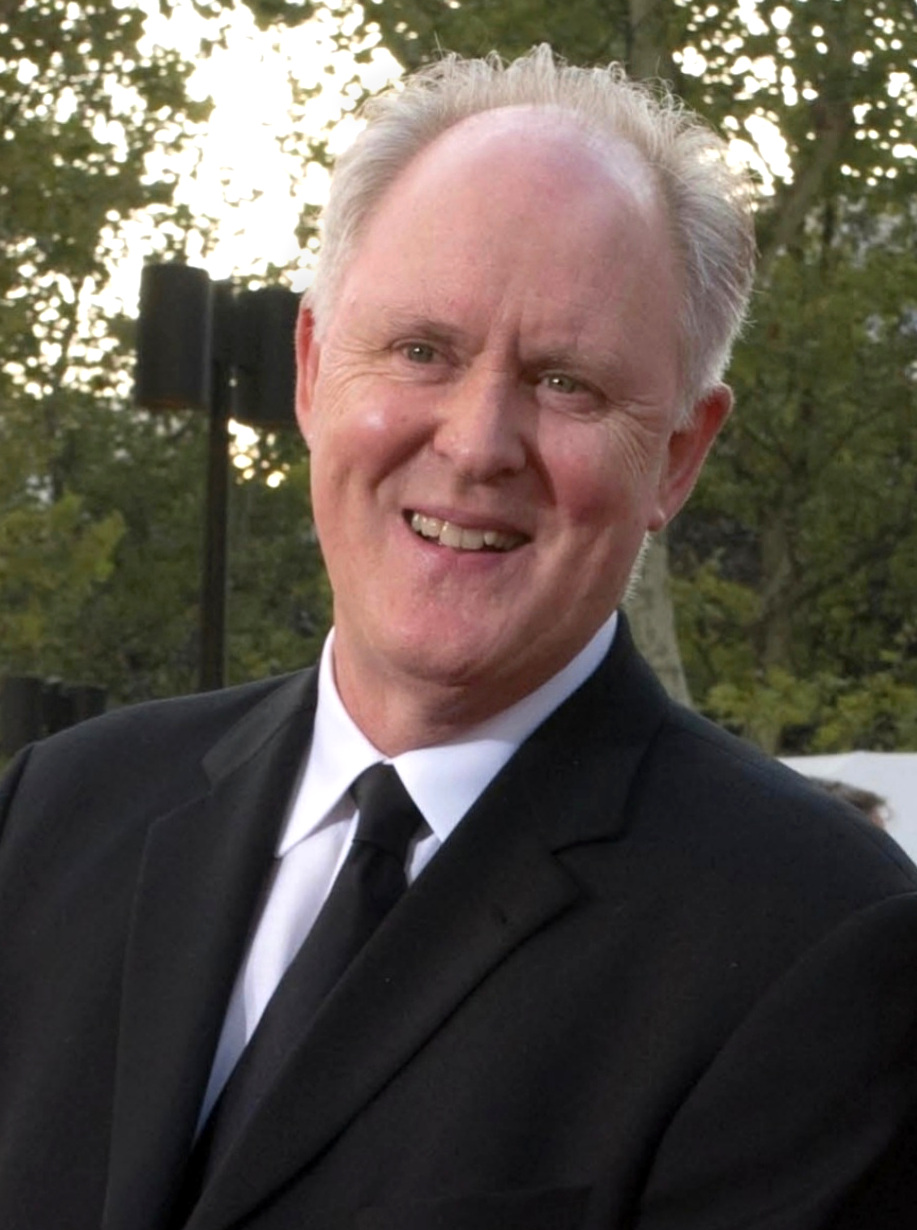
John Lithgow won for The Changing Room (1973)

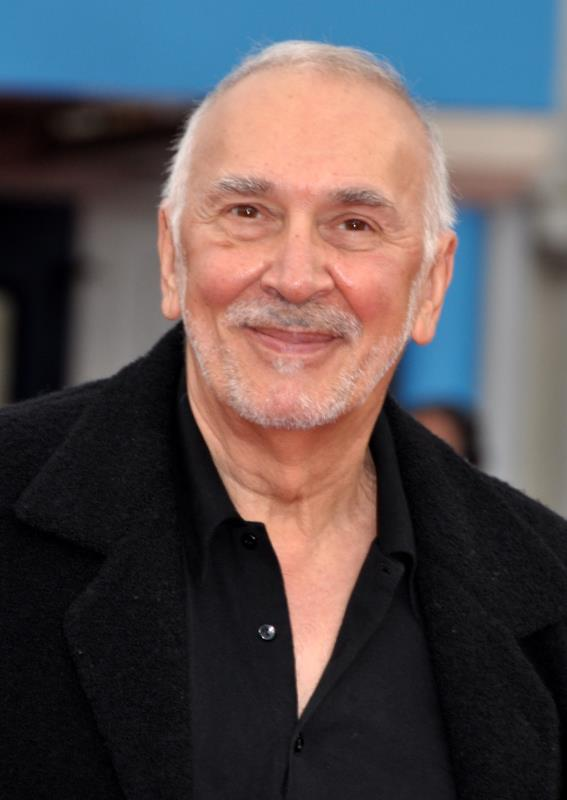
Frank Langella, the only person to win the award multiple times, won in 1975 and 2002

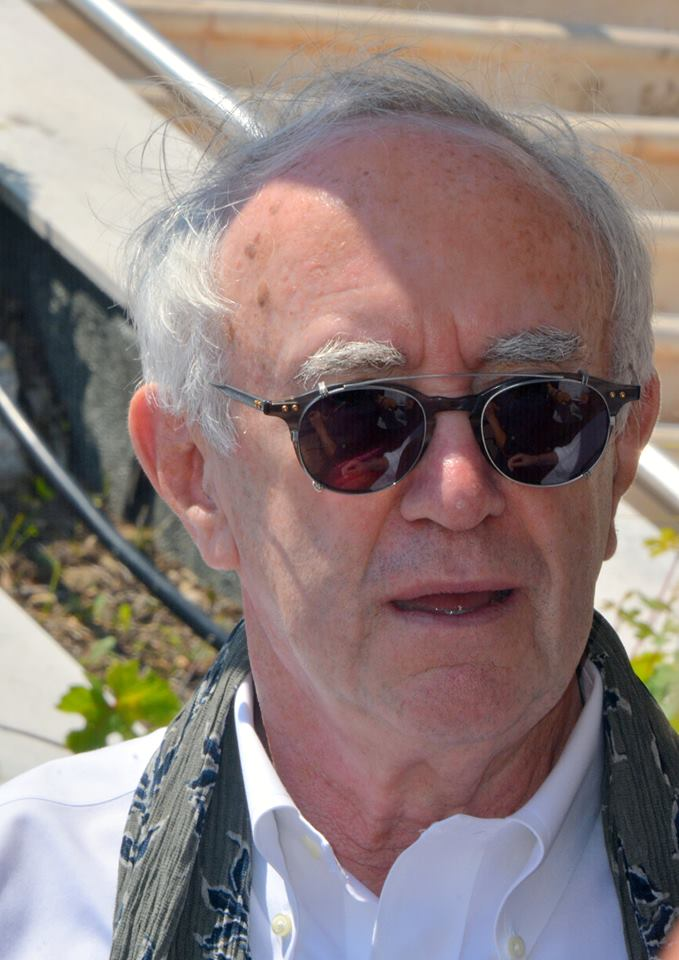
Jonathan Pryce won for Comedians (1977)

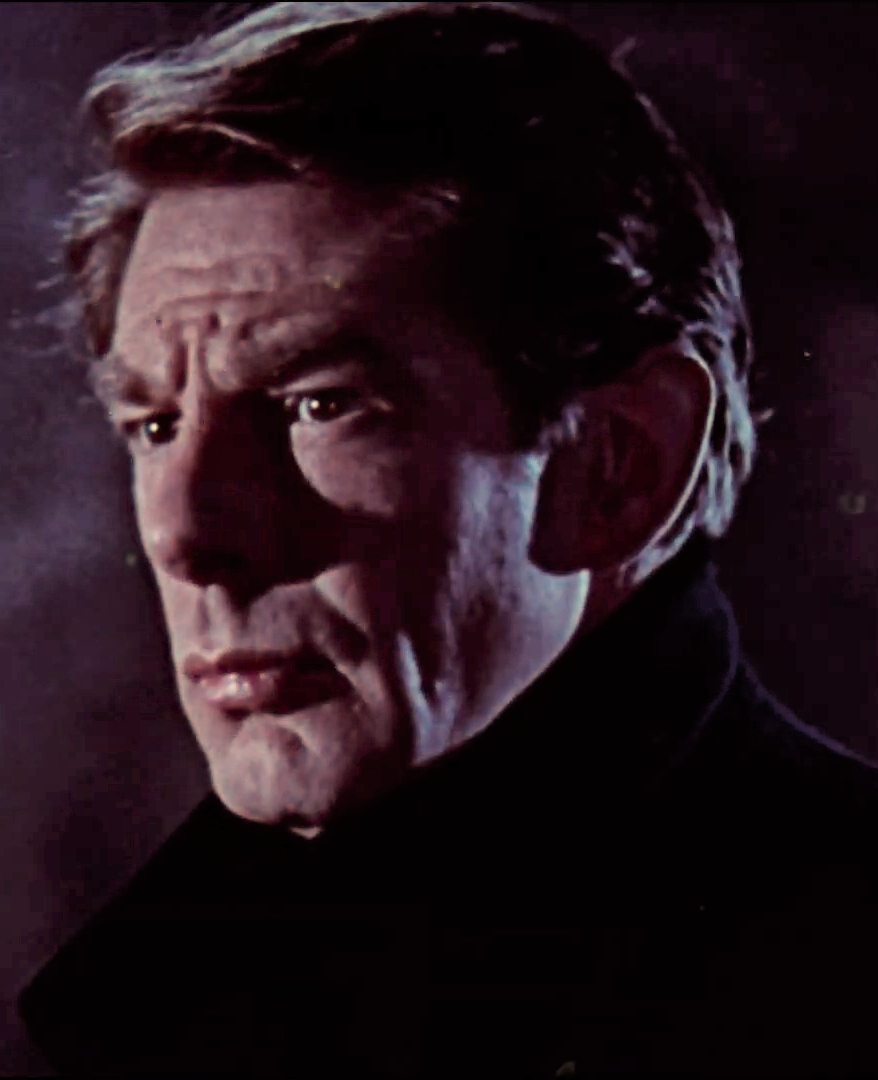
Michael Gough won for Bedroom Farce (1979)

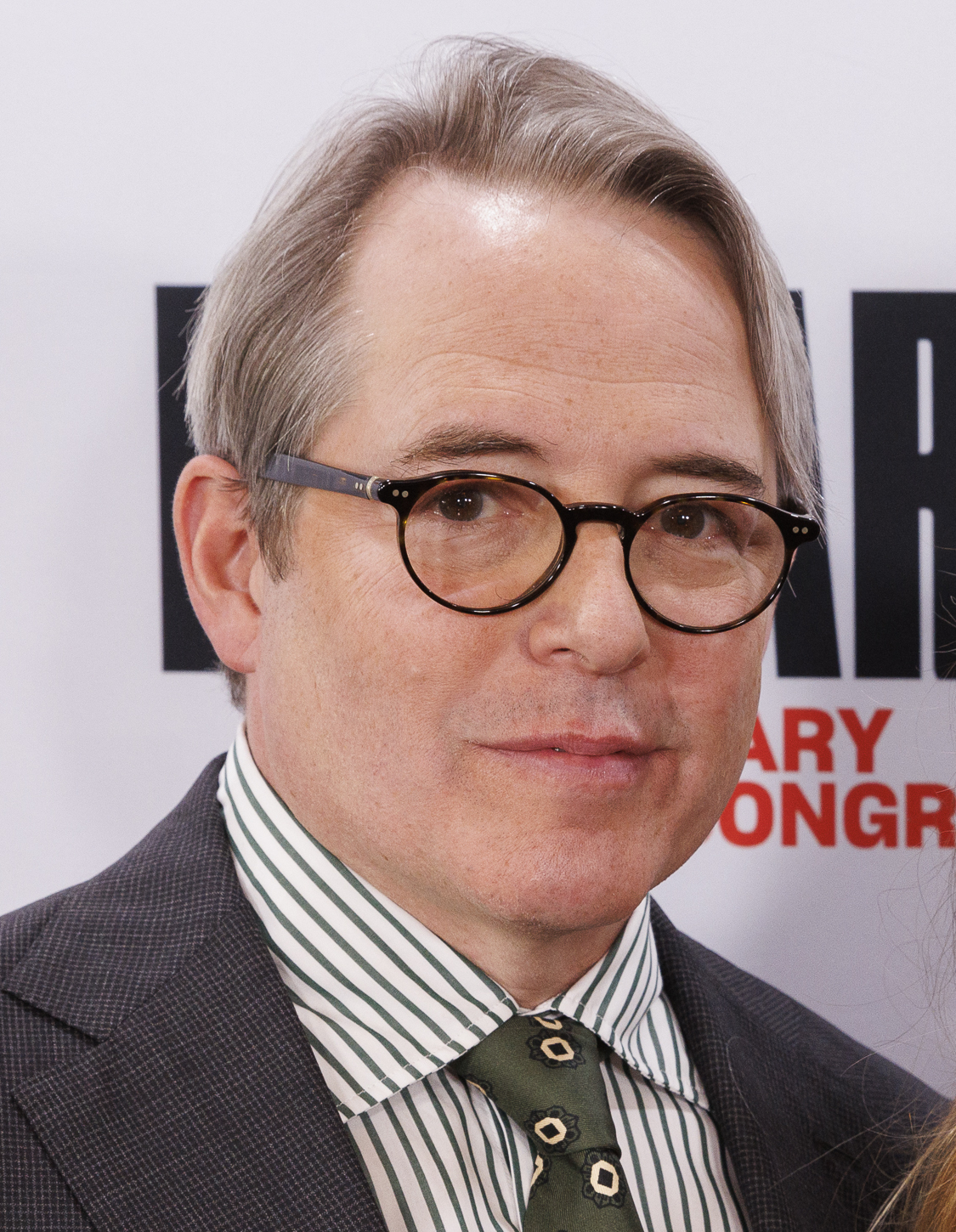
Matthew Broderick won for Brighton Beach Memoirs (1983)

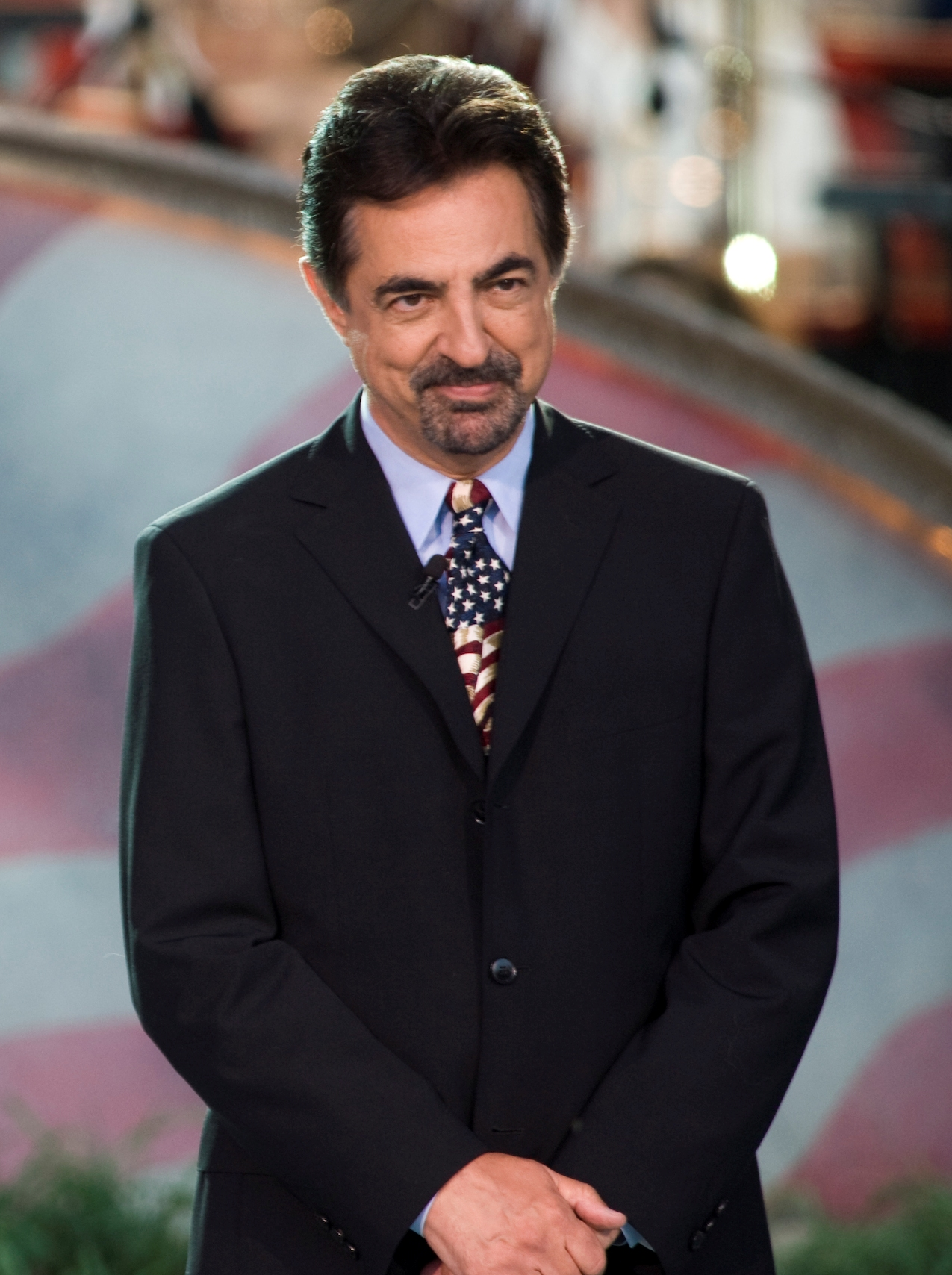
1984 award winner Joe Mantegna

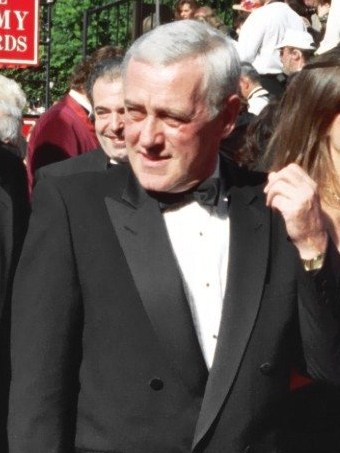
John Mahoney won for The House of Blue Leaves (1986)

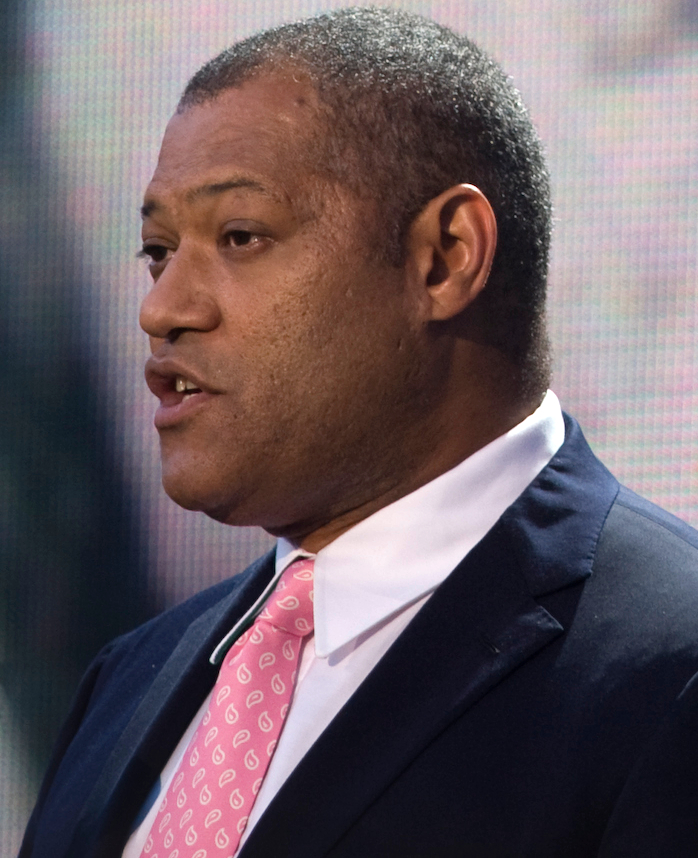
1992 award winner Laurence Fishburne

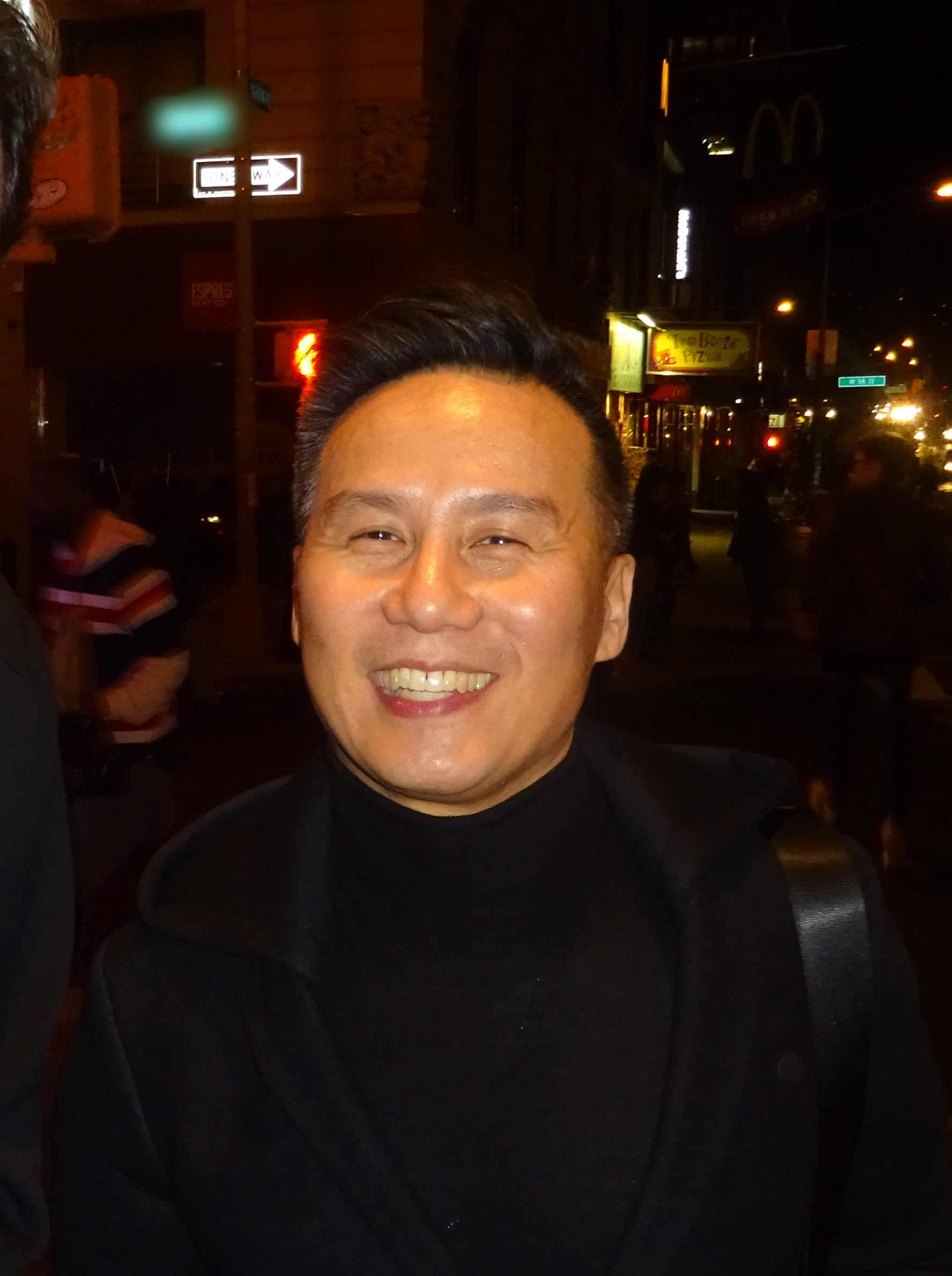
B.D. Wong won in 1988. He is the first actor of Asian descent to win this category

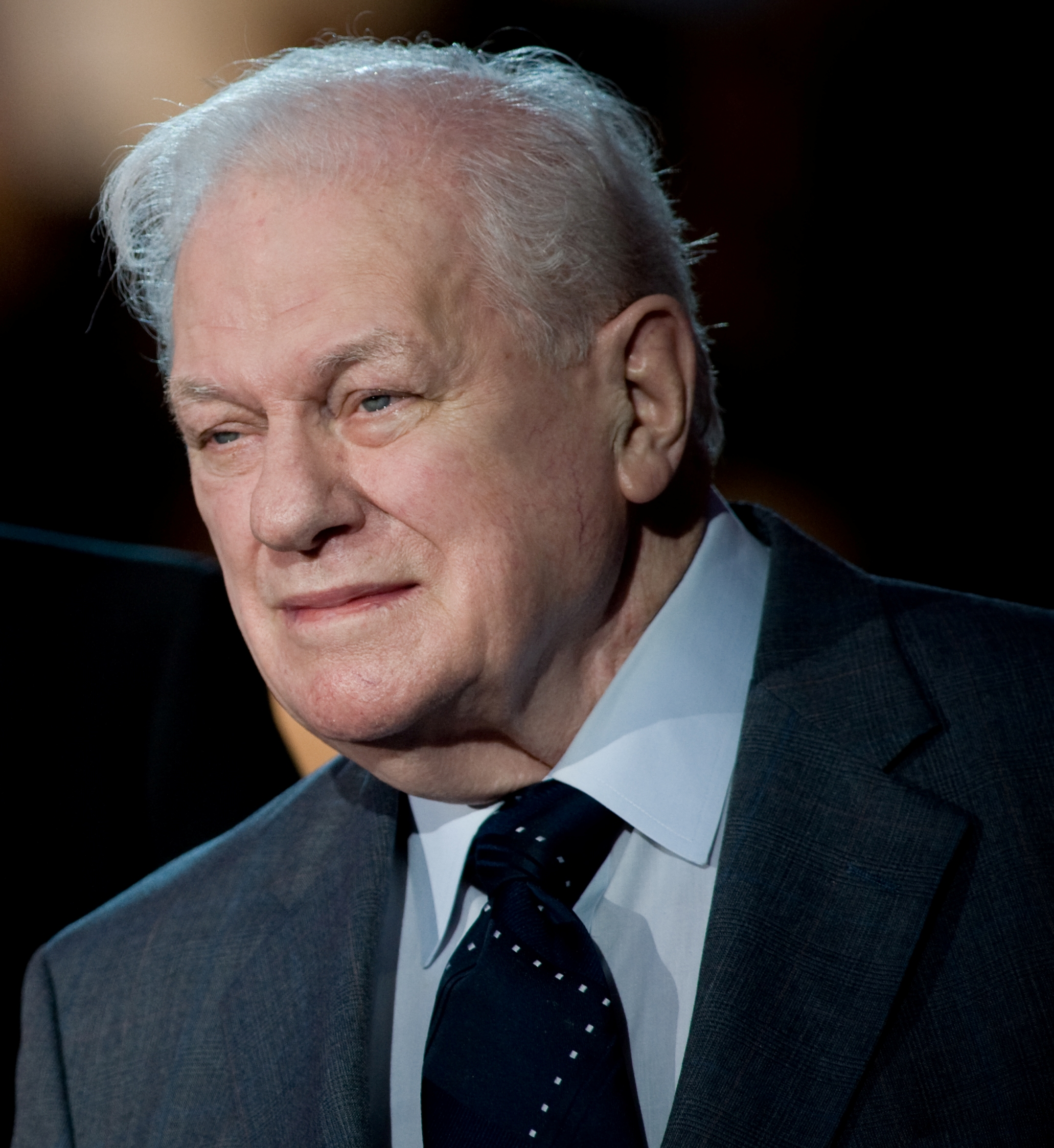
Charles Durning won for Cat on a Hot Tin Roof (1990)

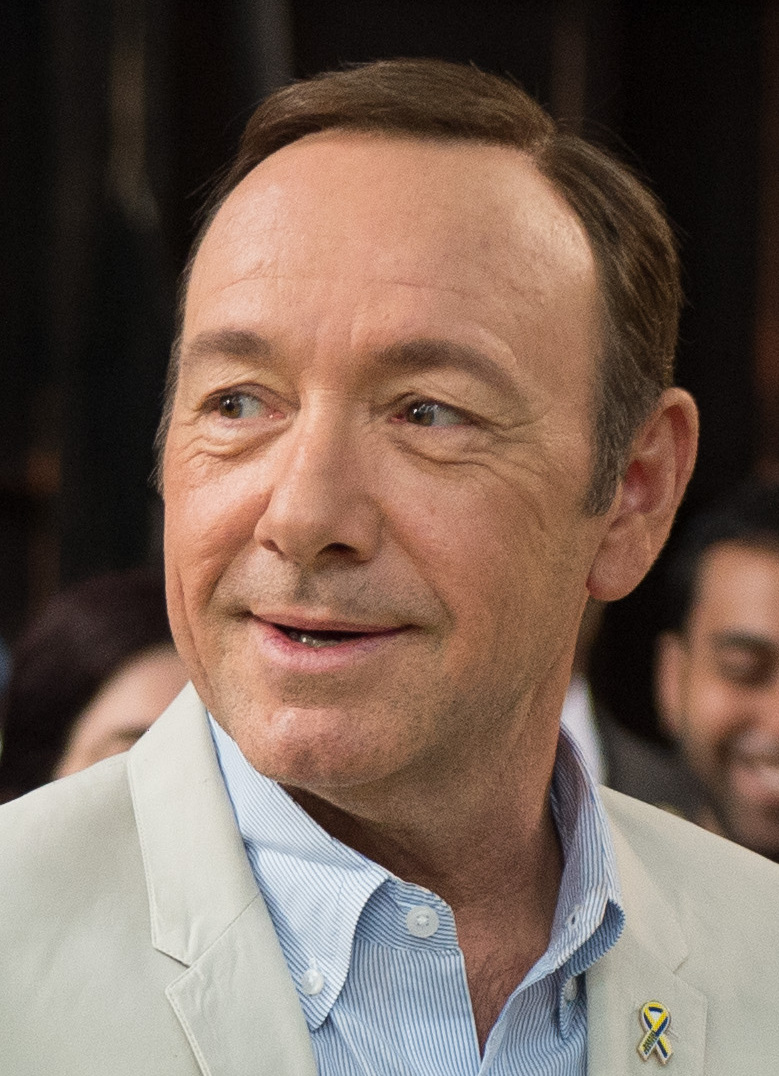
Kevin Spacey won for Lost in Yonkers (1991)

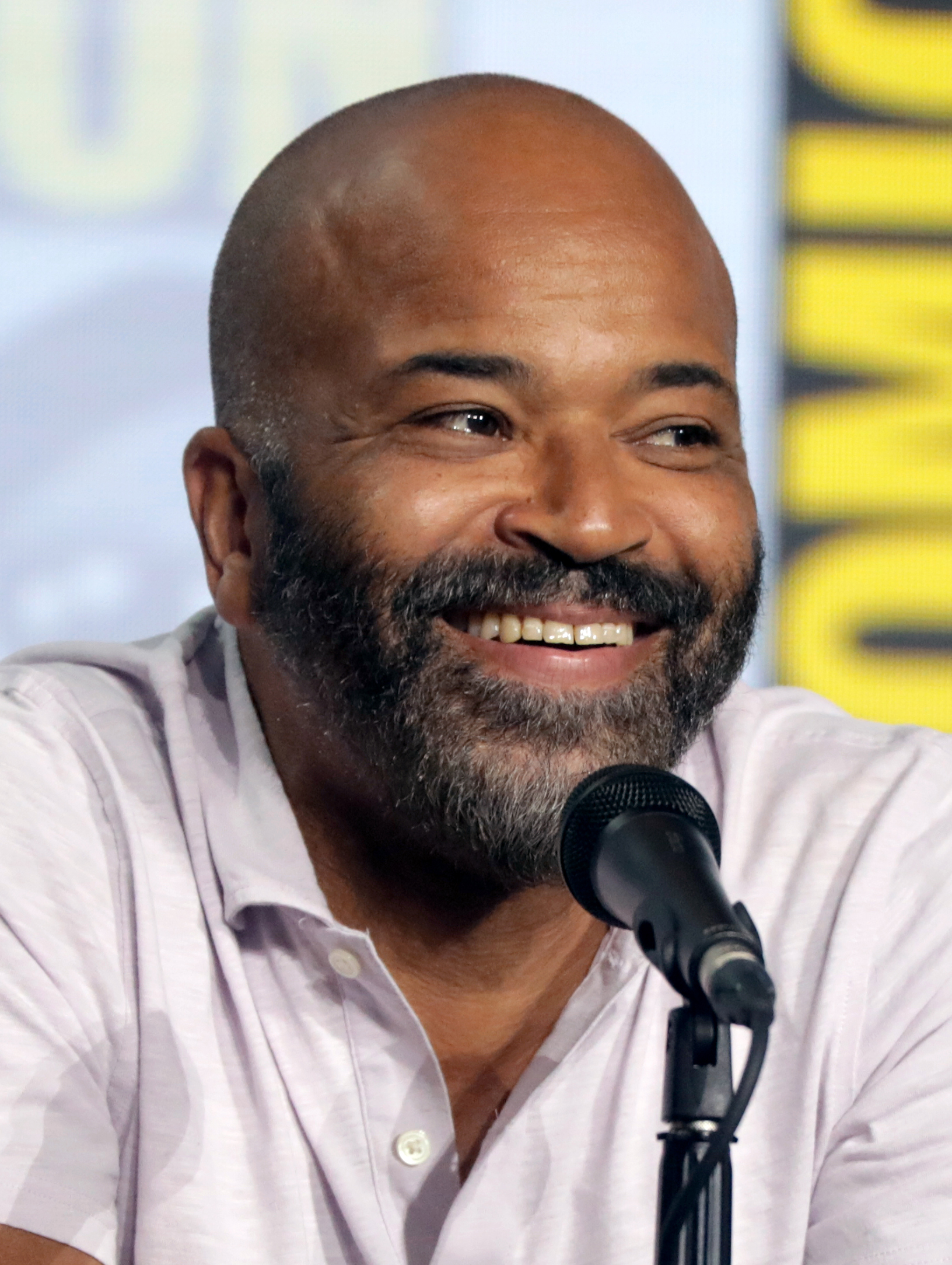
Jeffrey Wright won for Angels in America (1993)

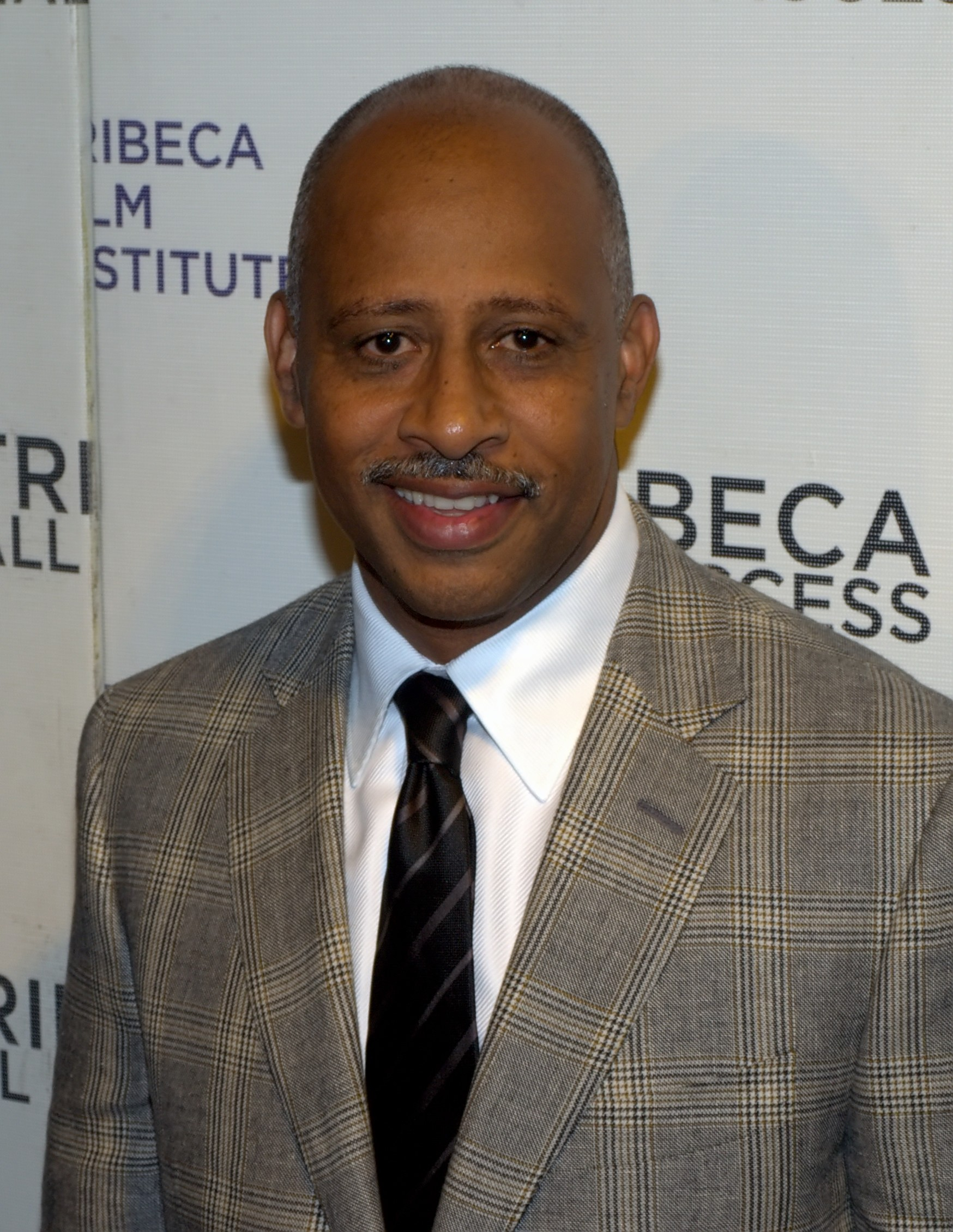
1996 award winner Ruben Santiago-Hudson

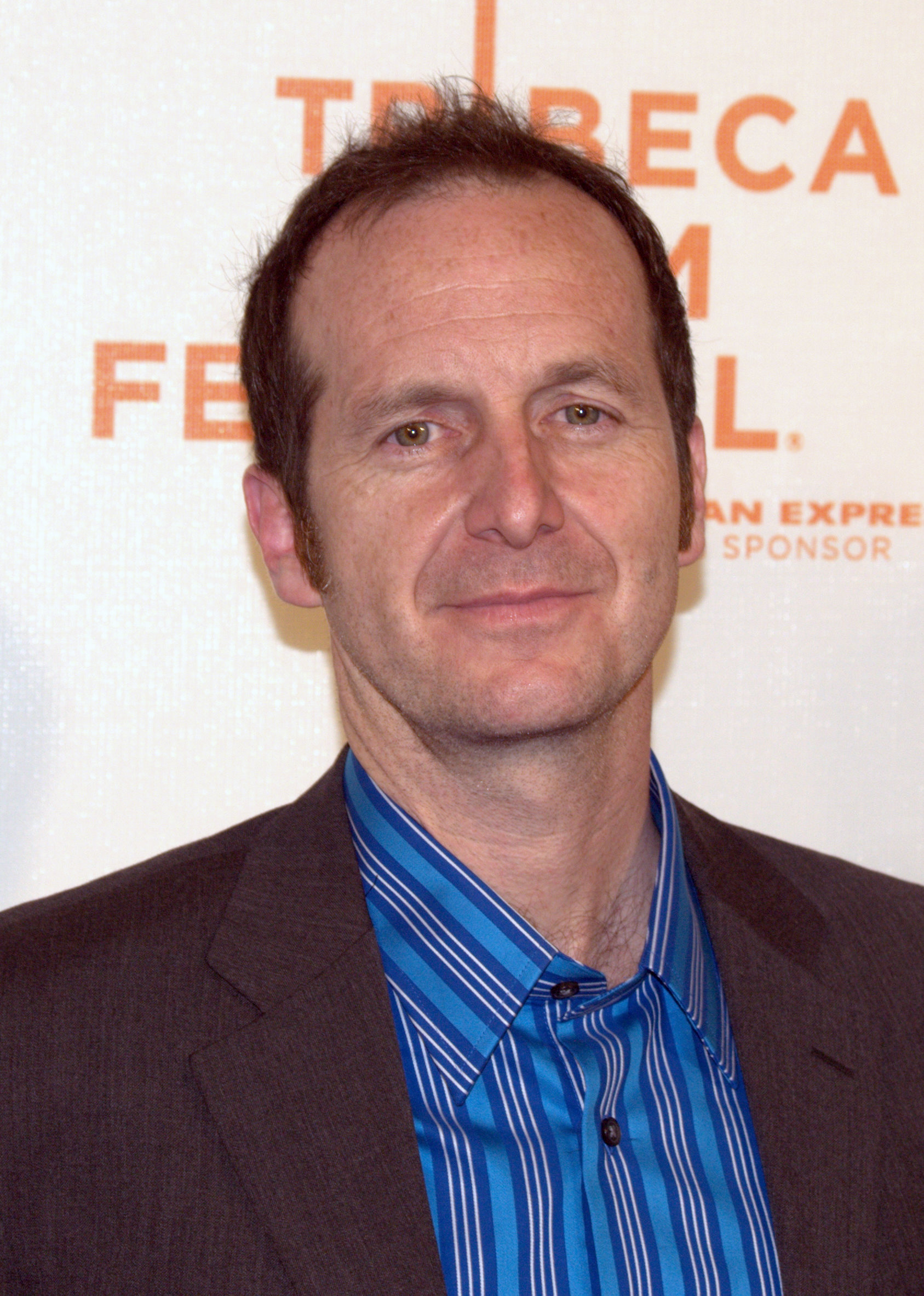
2003 award winner Denis O'Hare

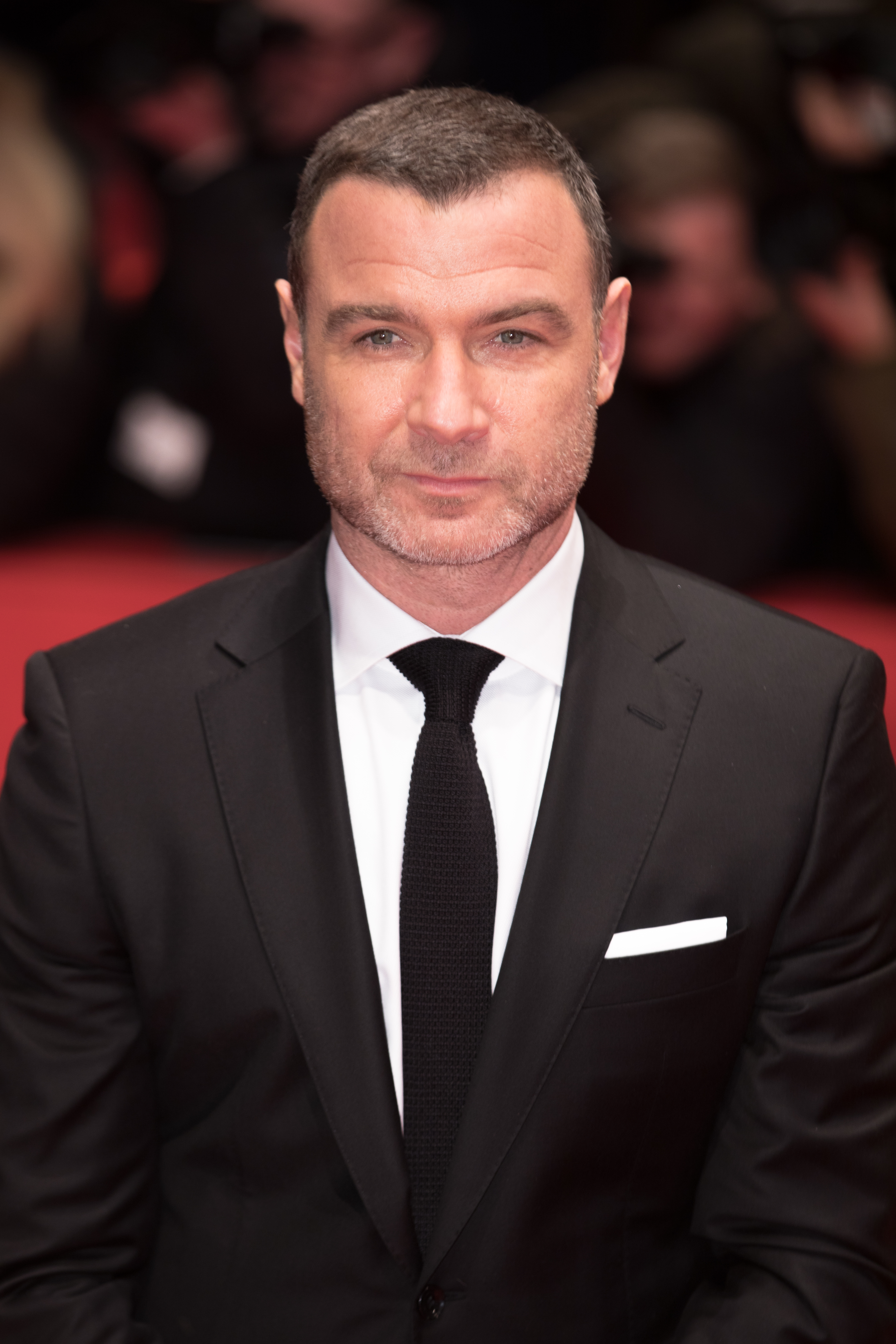
Liev Schreiber won for Glengarry Glen Ross (2005)

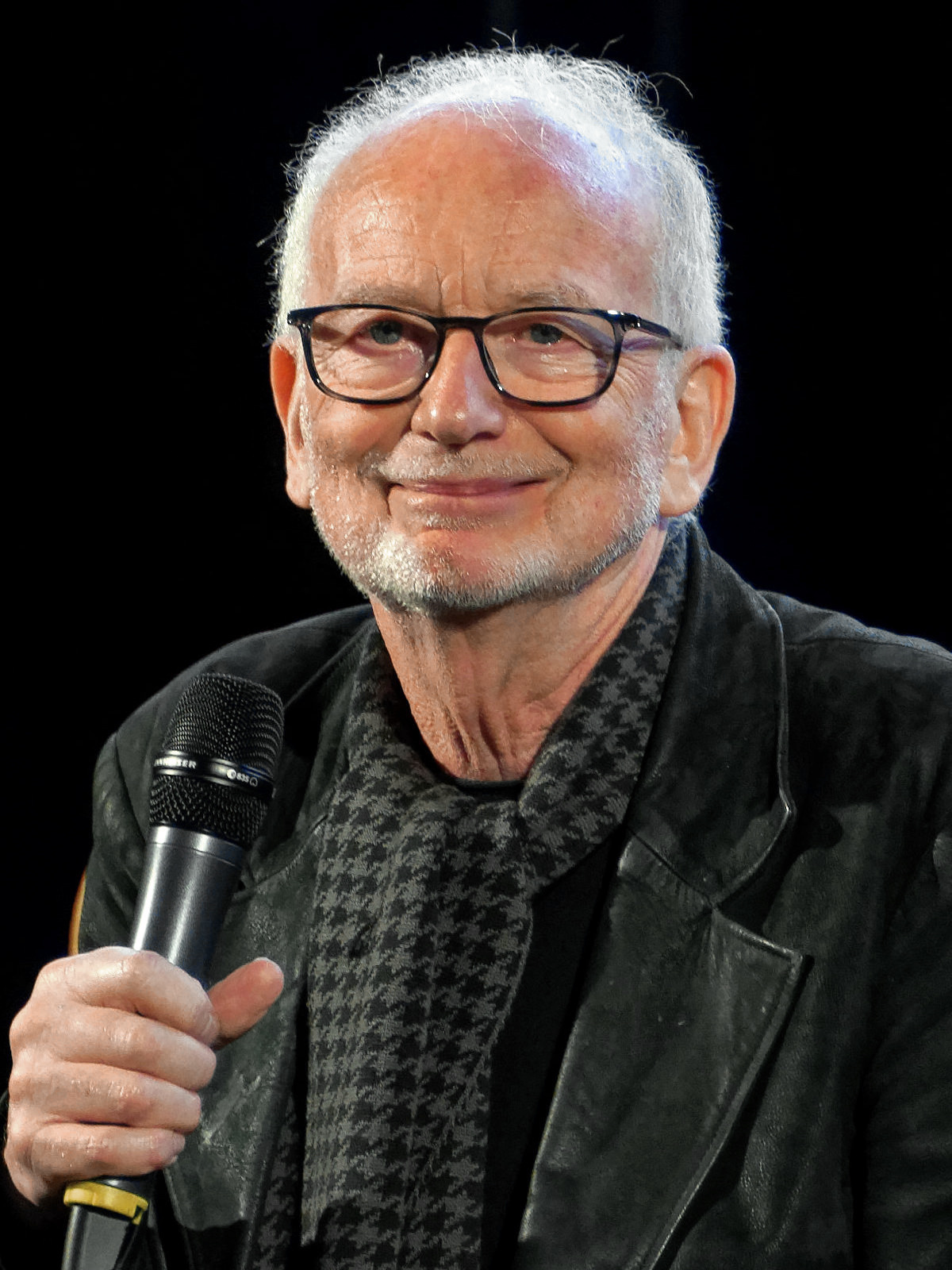
Ian McDiarmid won in 2006 for Faith Healer

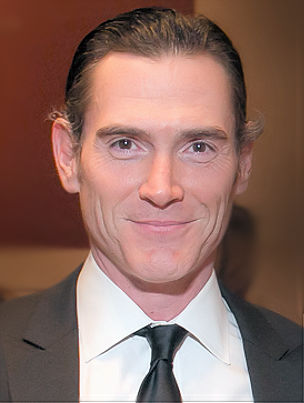
Billy Crudup won for The Coasts of Utopia (2007)

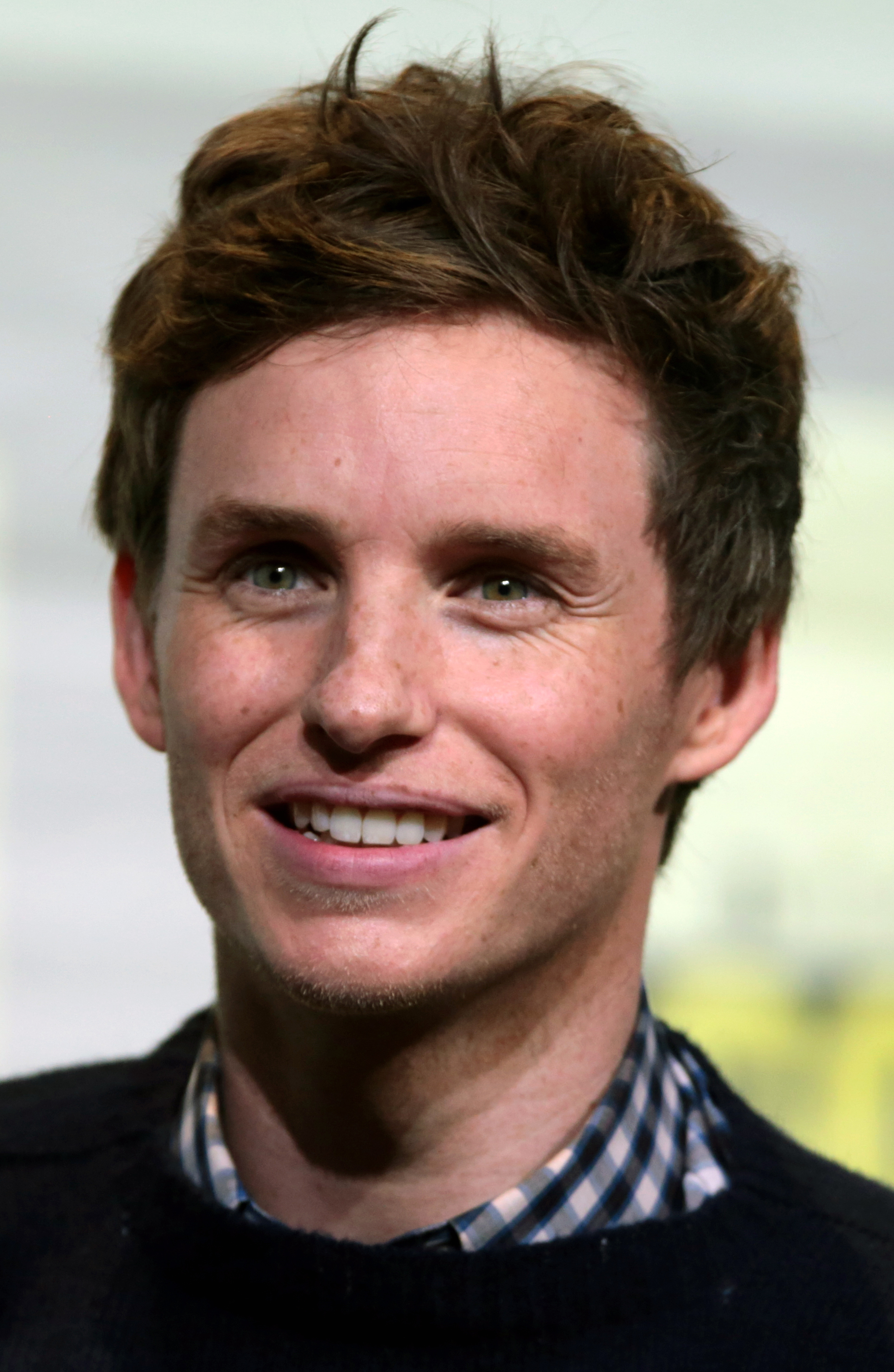
Eddie Redmayne won for Red (2010)

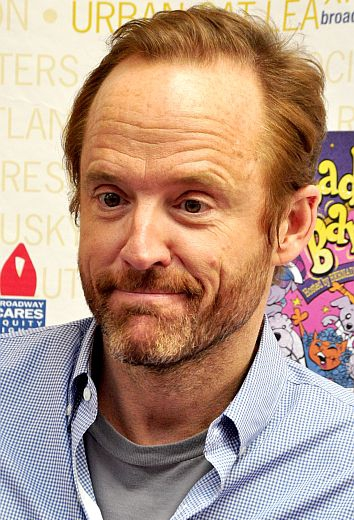
2011 award winner John Benjamin Hickey

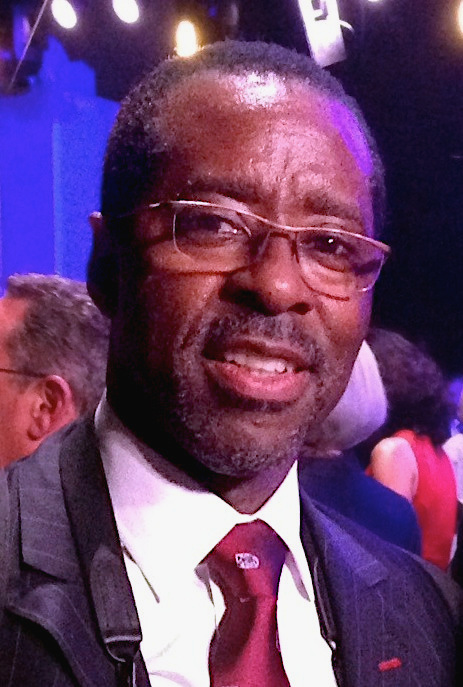
Courtney B. Vance won for Lucky Guy (2013)

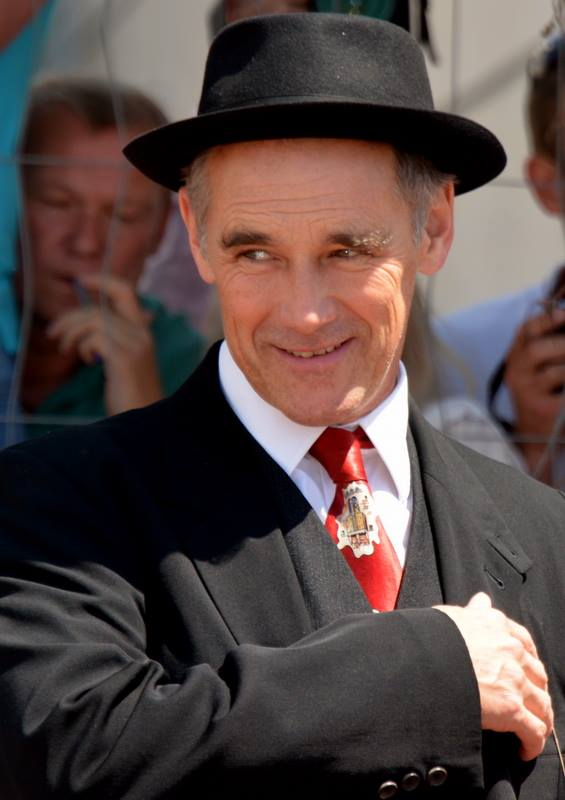
Mark Rylance won for Twelfth Night (2014)

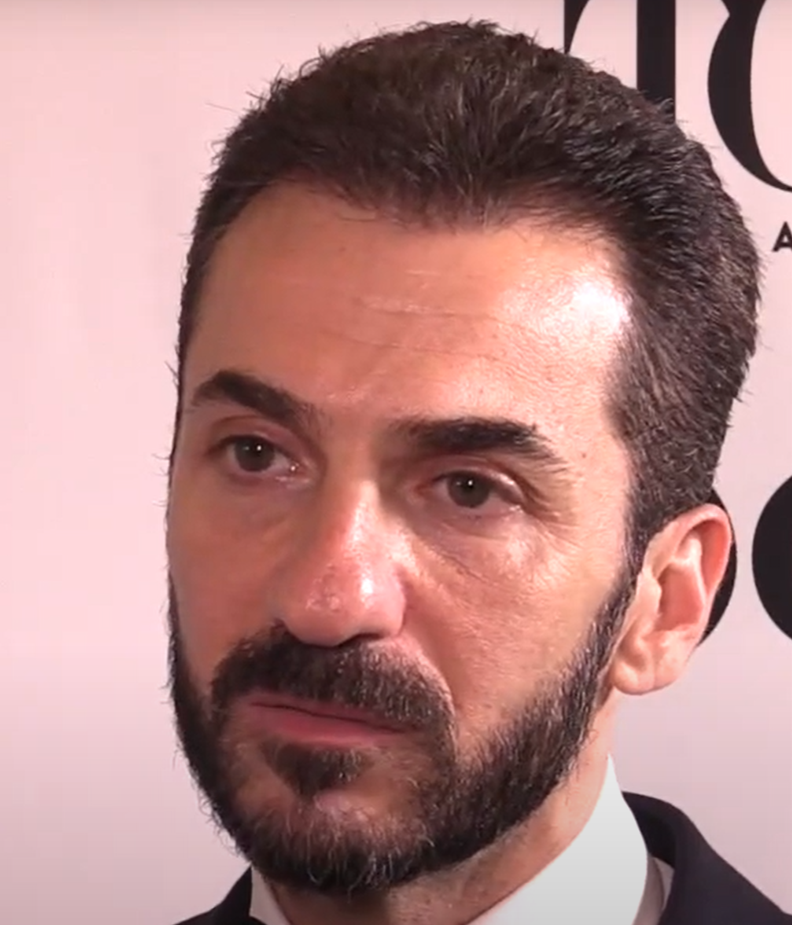
Michael Aronov won for Oslo (2017)

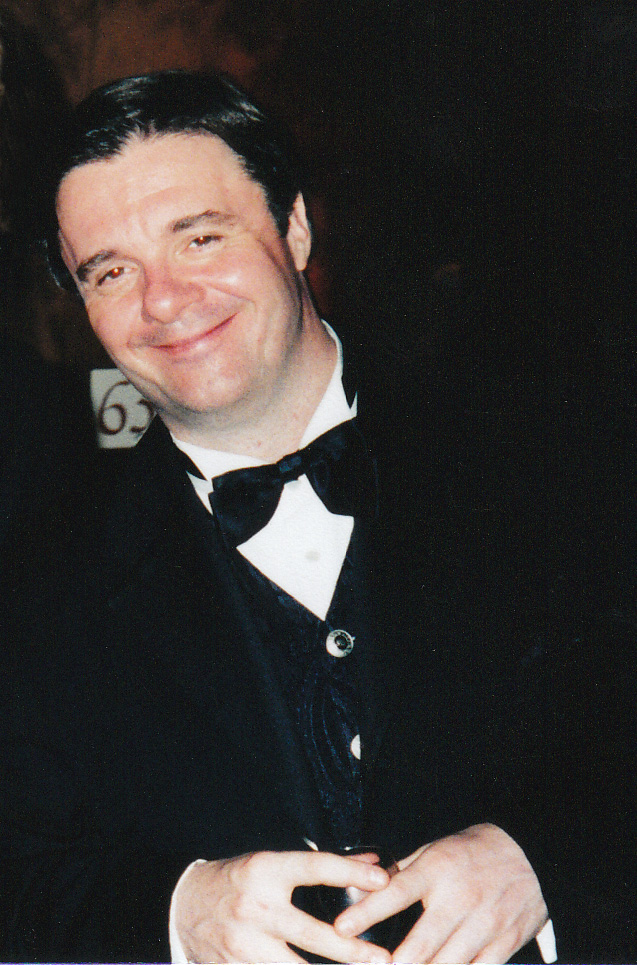
Nathan Lane won for Angels in America (2018)

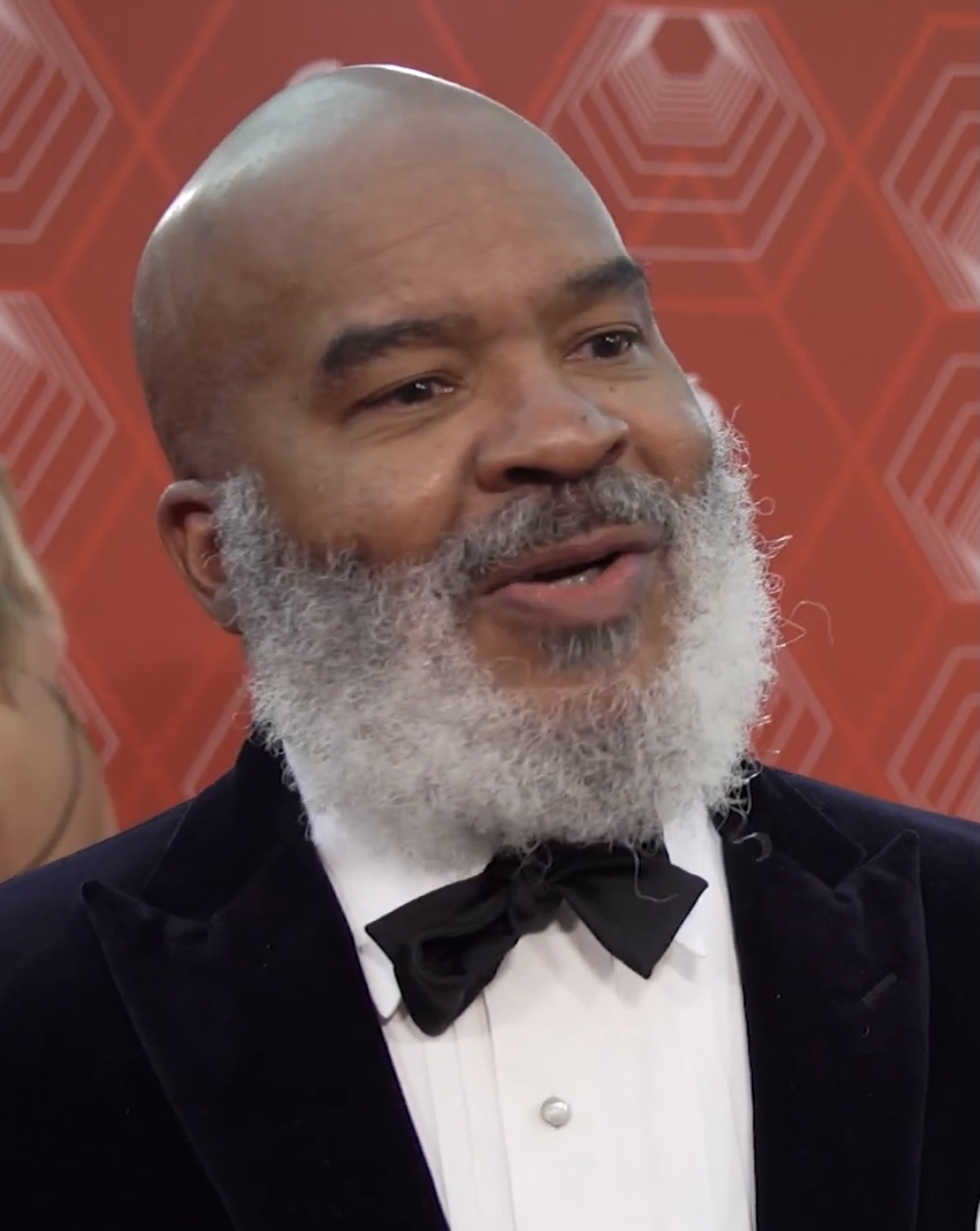
David Alan Grier won for A Soldier's Play (2020)

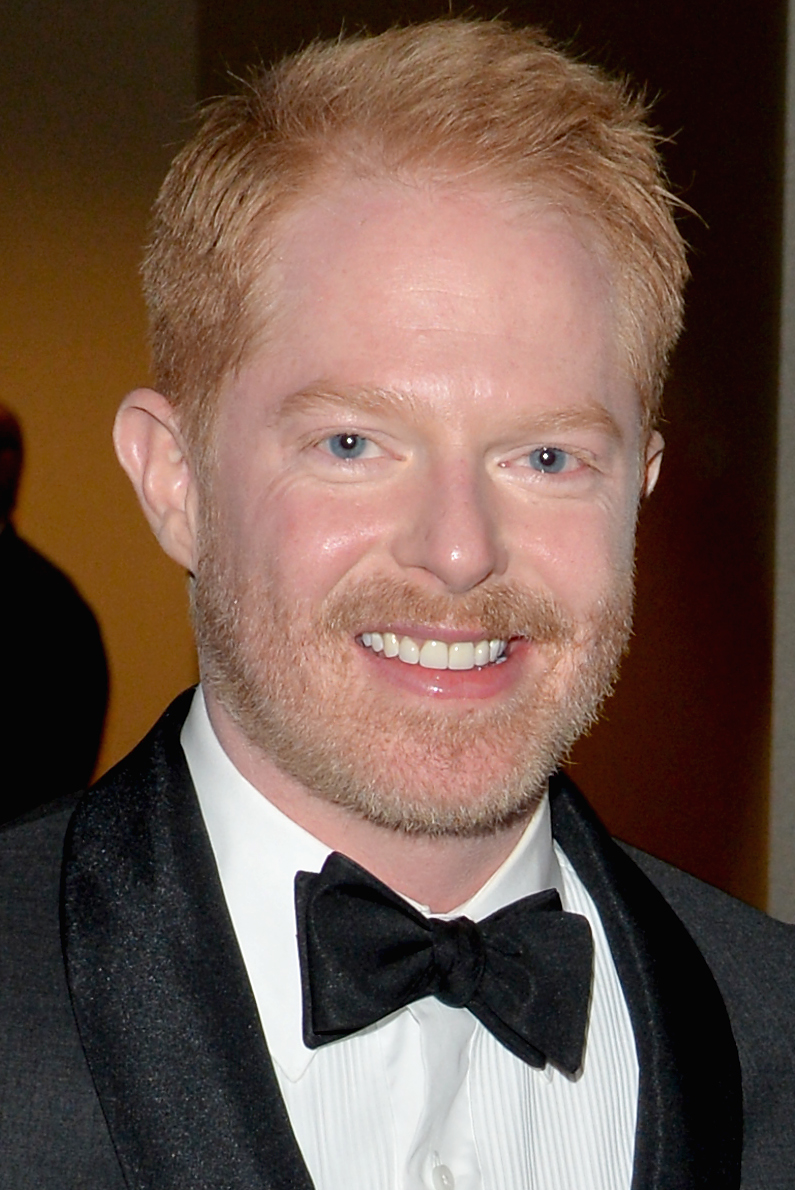
Jesse Tyler Ferguson won for Take Me Out (2022)

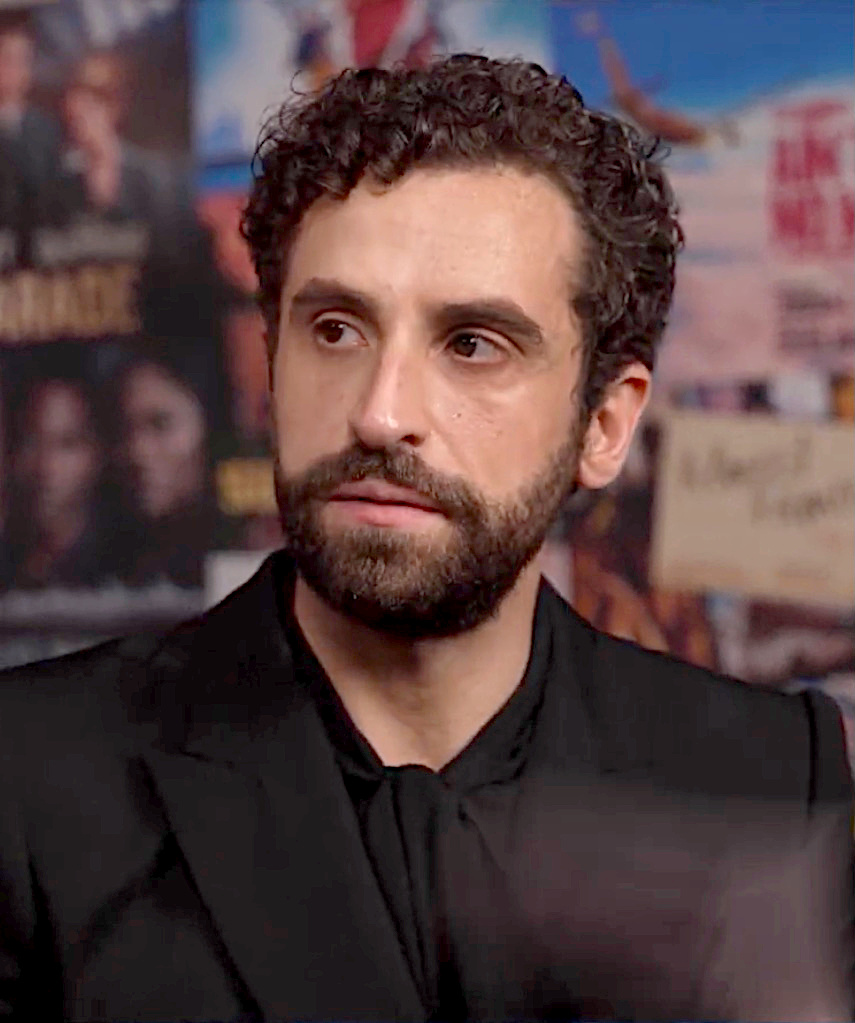
Brandon Uranowitz won for Leopoldstadt (2023)

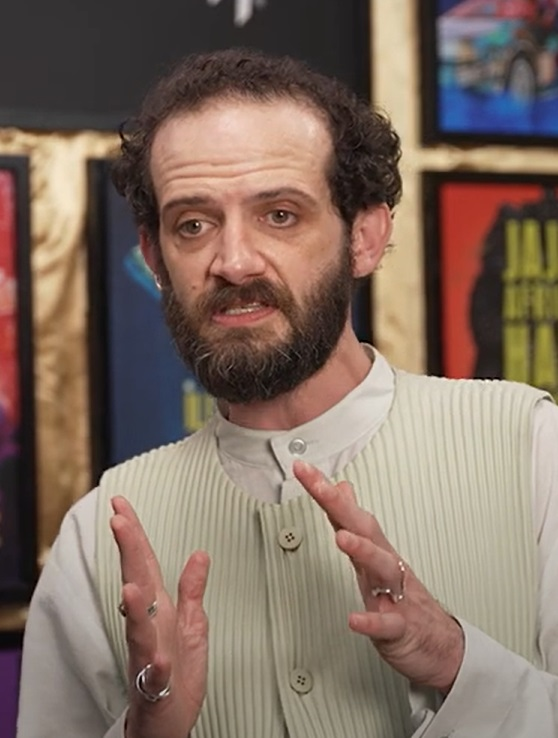
Will Brill won for Stereophonic (2024)

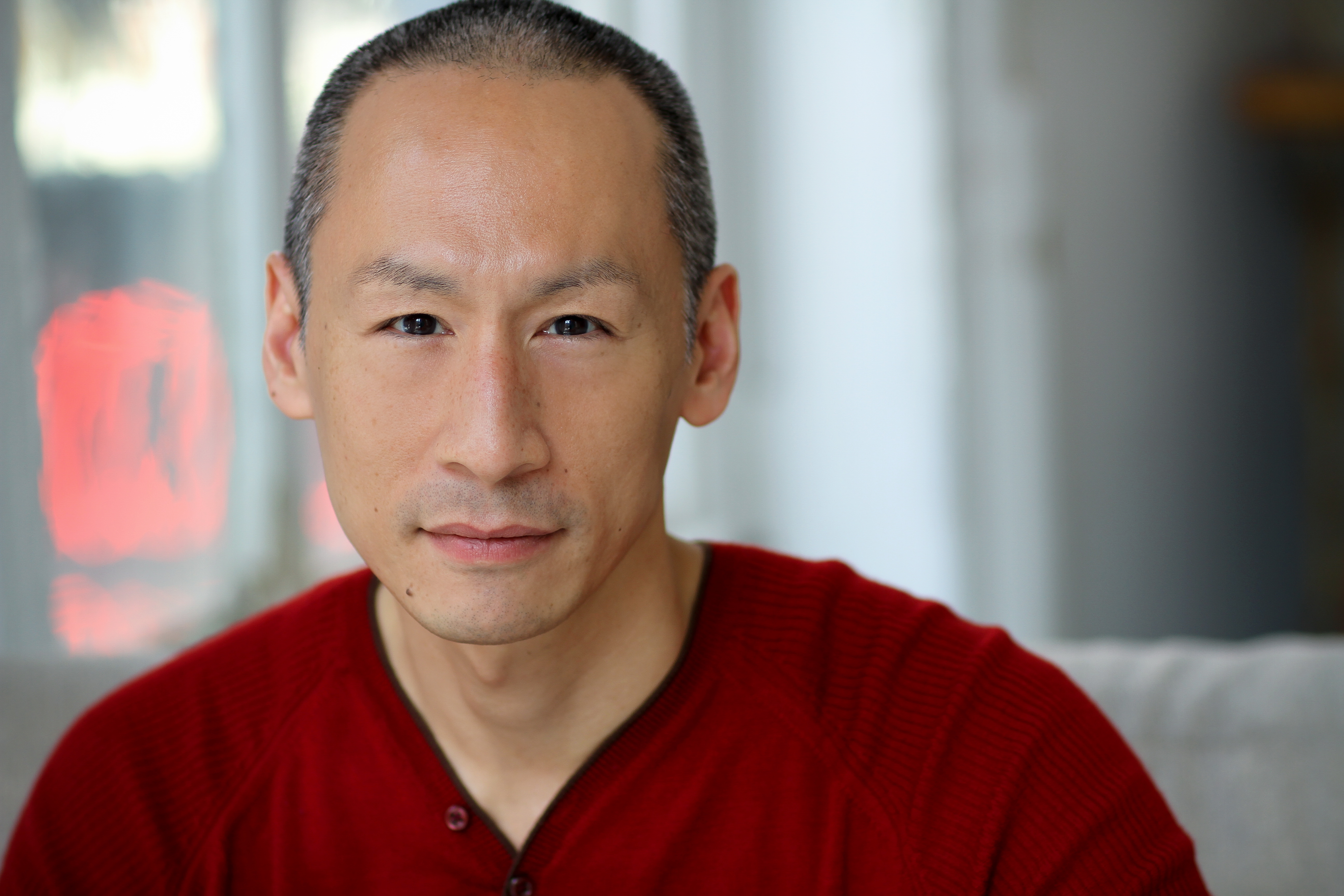
Francis Jue won for Yellow Face (2025)

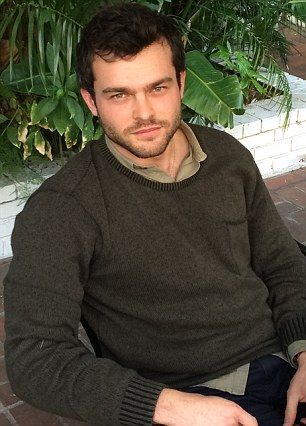
Alden Ehrenreich won for Becky Shaw (2026)

=== 1940s ===
Year	Actor	Project	Role(s)	Ref.
1949 (3rd)
1949 (3rd)	Arthur Kennedy	Death of a Salesman	Biff Loman	

=== 1950s ===
Year	Actor	Project	Role(s)	Ref.
1950 (4th)	Not awarded			
1951 (5th)
1951 (5th)	Eli Wallach	The Rose Tattoo	Alvaro Mangiacavallo	
1952 (6th)
1952 (6th)	John Cromwell	Point of No Return	John Gray	
1953 (7th)
1953 (7th)	John Williams	Dial M for Murder	Inspector Hubbard	
1954 (8th)
1954 (8th)	John Kerr	Tea and Sympathy	Tom Robinson Lee	
1955 (9th)
1955 (9th)	Francis L. Sullivan	Witness for the Prosecution	Sir Wilfrid Robats, Q.C.	
1956 (10th)
1956 (10th)	Ed Begley	Inherit the Wind	Matthew Harrison Brady	
1956 (10th)	Anthony Franciosa	A Hatful of Rain	Polo Pope	
1956 (10th)	Andy Griffith	No Time for Sergeants	Will Stockdale	
1956 (10th)	Anthony Quayle	Tamburlaine the Great	Tamburlaine	
1956 (10th)	Fritz Weaver	The Chalk Garden	Maitland	
1957 (11th)
1957 (11th)	Frank Conroy	The Potting Shed	Father William Callifer	
1957 (11th)	Eddie Mayehoff	A Visit to a Small Planet	General Tom Powers	
1957 (11th)	William Podmore	Separate Tables	Mr. Fowler	
1957 (11th)	Jason Robards	Long Day's Journey into Night	James Tyrone Jr.	
1958 (12th)
1958 (12th)	Henry Jones	Sunrise at Campobello	Louis McHenry Howe	
1958 (12th)	Sig Arno	Time Remembered	Ferdinand	
1958 (12th)	Theodore Bikel	The Rope Dancers	Dr. Jacobson	
1958 (12th)	Pat Hingle	The Dark at the Top of the Stairs	Rubin Flood	
1958 (12th)	George Relph	The Entertainer	Billy Rice	
1959 (13th)
1959 (13th)	Charlie Ruggles	The Pleasure of His Company	Mackenzie Savage	
1959 (13th)	Marc Connelly	Tall Story	Professor Charles Osman	
1959 (13th)	George Grizzard	The Disenchanted	Shep Stearns	
1959 (13th)	Walter Matthau	Once More, with Feeling!	Maxwell Archer	
1959 (13th)	Robert Morse	Say, Darling	Ted Snow	
1959 (13th)	George C. Scott	Comes a Day	Tydings Glenn	

=== 1960s ===
Year	Actor	Project	Role(s)	Ref.
1960 (14th)
1960 (14th)	Roddy McDowall	The Fighting Cock	Tarquin Edward Mendigales	
1960 (14th)	Warren Beatty	A Loss of Roses	Kenny	
1960 (14th)	Harry Guardino	One More River	Pompey	
1960 (14th)	Rip Torn	Sweet Bird of Youth	Tom Junior	
1960 (14th)	Lawrence Winters	The Long Dream	Tyree Tucker	
1961 (15th)
1961 (15th)	Martin Gabel	Big Fish, Little Fish	Basil Smythe	
1961 (15th)	Philip Bosco	The Rape of the Belt	Heracles	
1961 (15th)	Eduardo Ciannelli	The Devil's Advocate	Aurelio	
1961 (15th)	George Grizzard	Big Fish, Little Fish	Ronnie Johnson	
1962 (16th)
1962 (16th)	Walter Matthau	A Shot in the Dark	Benjamin Beaurevers	
1962 (16th)	Godfrey Cambridge	Purlie Victorious	Gitlow Judson	
1962 (16th)	Joseph Campanella	A Gift of Time	Daniel Stein	
1962 (16th)	Paul Sparer	Ross	Auda Abu Tayi	
1963 (17th)
1963 (17th)	Alan Arkin	Enter Laughing	David Kolowitz	
1963 (17th)	Barry Gordon	A Thousand Clowns	Nick Burns	
1963 (17th)	Paul Rogers	Photo Finish	Reginald Kinsale, Esq.	
1963 (17th)	Frank Silvera	The Lady of the Carnellias	M. Duval	
1964 (18th)
1964 (18th)	Hume Cronyn	Hamlet	Polonius	
1964 (18th)	Lee Allen	Marathon '33	Patsy	
1964 (18th)	Michael Dunn	The Ballad of the Sad Café	Cousin Lyman	
1964 (18th)	Larry Gates	A Case of Libel	Boyd Bendix	
1965 (19th)
1965 (19th)	Jack Albertson	The Subject Was Roses	John Cleary	
1965 (19th)	Murray Hamilton	Absence of a Cello	Otis Clifton	
1965 (19th)	Martin Sheen	The Subject Was Roses	Timmy Cleary	
1965 (19th)	Clarence Williams III	Slow Dance on the Killing Ground	Randall	
1966 (20th)
1966 (20th)	Patrick Magee	Marat/Sade	Marquis de Sade	
1966 (20th)	Burt Brinckerhoff	Cactus Flower	Igor	
1966 (20th)	Larry Haines	Generation	Stan Herman	
1966 (20th)	Eamon Kelly	Philadelphia, Here I Come!	S. B. O'Donnell	
1967 (21st)
1967 (21st)	Ian Holm	The Homecoming	Lenny	
1967 (21st)	Clayton Corzatte	The School for Scandal	Charles Surface	
1967 (21st)	Stephen Elliott	Marat/Sade	Mr. Coulmier	
1967 (21st)	Sydney Walker	The Wild Duck	Lt. Ekdal	
1968 (22nd)
1968 (22nd)	James Patterson	The Birthday Party	Stanley	
1968 (22nd)	Paul Hecht	Rosencrantz and Guildenstern Are Dead	The Player	
1968 (22nd)	Brian Murray	Rosencrantz and Guildenstern Are Dead	Rosencrantz	
1968 (22nd)	John Wood	Rosencrantz and Guildenstern Are Dead	Guildenstern	
1969 (23rd)
1969 (23rd)	Al Pacino	Does a Tiger Wear a Necktie?	Bickham	
1969 (23rd)	Richard S. Castellano	Lovers and Other Strangers	Frank	
1969 (23rd)	Tony Roberts	Play It Again, Sam	Dick Christie	
1969 (23rd)	Louis Zorich	Hadrian VII	Cardinal Ragna	

=== 1970s ===
Year	Actor	Project	Role(s)	Ref.
1970 (24th)
1970 (24th)	Ken Howard	Child's Play	Paul Reese	
1970 (24th)	Joseph Bova	The Chinese and Dr. Fish	Mr. Lee	
1970 (24th)	Dennis King	A Patriot for Me	Baron von Epp	
1971 (25th)
1971 (25th)	Paul Sand	Paul Sills' Story Theatre	Various Characters (Note: Sand played as Cowherd and the Rich Peasant in The Little Peasant, Robber Bridegroom in The Robber Bridegroom, Turkey Lurkey in Henny Penny, Clerk and Soldier in The Master Thief, Simpleton in The Golden Goose and Hound in Town Musicians of Bremen.)	
1971 (25th)	Ronald Radd	Abelard and Heloise	Gilies de Vannes	
1971 (25th)	Donald Pickering	Conduct Unbecoming	Capt. Rupert Harper	
1971 (25th)	Ed Zimmermann	The Philanthropist	Donald	
1972 (26th)
1972 (26th)	Vincent Gardenia	The Prisoner of Second Avenue	Harry Edison	
1972 (26th)	Douglas Rain	Vivat! Vivat Regina!	William Cecil	
1972 (26th)	Lee Richardson	Vivat! Vivat Regina!	Lord Bothwell	
1972 (26th)	Joe Silver	Lenny	Various Characters	
1973 (27th)
1973 (27th)	John Lithgow	The Changing Room	Kenny Kendal	
1973 (27th)	Barnard Hughes	Much Ado About Nothing	Dogberry	
1973 (27th)	John McMartin	Don Juan	Sganarelle	
1973 (27th)	Hayward Morse	Butley	Joseph Keyston	
1974 (28th)
1974 (28th)	Ed Flanders	A Moon for the Misbegotten	Phil Hogan	
1974 (28th)	René Auberjonois	The Good Doctor	Performer	
1974 (28th)	Douglas Turner Ward	The River Niger	Johnny Williams	
1974 (28th)	Dick Anthony Williams	What the Wine-Sellers Buy	Rico	
1975 (29th)
1975 (29th)	Frank Langella	Seascape	Leslie	
1975 (29th)	Larry Blyden	Absurd Person Singular	Sidney	
1975 (29th)	Leonard Frey	The National Health	Barnet	
1975 (29th)	Philip Locke	Sherlock Holmes	Professor Moriarty	
1975 (29th)	George Rose	My Fat Friend	Henry	
1975 (29th)	Dick Anthony Williams	Black Picture Show	Alexander	
1976 (30th)
1976 (30th)	Edward Herrmann	Mrs. Warren's Profession	Frank Gardner	
1976 (30th)	Barry Bostwick	They Knew What They Wanted	Joe	
1976 (30th)	Gabriel Dell	Lamppost Reunion	Fred Santora	
1976 (30th)	Daniel Seltzer	Knock Knock	Cohn	
1977 (31st)
1977 (31st)	Jonathan Pryce	Comedians	Gethin Price	
1977 (31st)	Bob Dishy	Sly Fox	Abner Truckle	
1977 (31st)	Joe Fields	The Basic Training of Pavlo Hummel	First Sergeant Tower	
1977 (31st)	Laurence Luckinbill	The Shadow Box	Brian	
1978 (32nd)
1978 (32nd)	Lester Rawlins	Da	Drumm	
1978 (32nd)	Morgan Freeman	The Mighty Gents	Zeke	
1978 (32nd)	Victor Garber	Deathtrap	Clifford Anderson	
1978 (32nd)	Cliff Gorman	Chapter Two	Leo Schneider	
1979 (33rd)
1979 (33rd)	Michael Gough	Bedroom Farce	Ernest	
1979 (33rd)	Bob Balaban	The Inspector General	Óssip	
1979 (33rd)	Joseph Maher	Spokesong	The Trick Cyclist	
1979 (33rd)	Edward James Olmos	Zoot Suit	El Pachuco	

=== 1980s ===
Year	Actor	Project	Role(s)	Ref.
1980 (34th)
1980 (34th)	David Rounds	Morning's at Seven	Homer Bolton	
1980 (34th)	David Dukes	Bent	Horst	
1980 (34th)	George Hearn	Watch on the Rhine	Kurt Muller	
1980 (34th)	Earle Hyman	The Lady from Dubuque	Oscar	
1980 (34th)	Joseph Maher	Night and Day	Geoffrey Carson	
1981 (35th)
1981 (35th)	Brian Backer	The Floating Light Bulb	Paul Pollack	
1981 (35th)	Tom Aldredge	The Little Foxes	Horace Giddens	
1981 (35th)	Adam Redfield	A Life	Desmond	
1981 (35th)	Shepperd Strudwick	To Grandmother's House We Go	Jared	
1982 (36th)
1982 (36th)	Zakes Mokae	Master Harold...and the Boys	Sam	
1982 (36th)	Richard Kavanaugh	The Hothouse	Gibbs	
1982 (36th)	Edward Petherbridge	The Life and Adventures of Nicholas Nickleby	Newman Noggs	
1982 (36th)	David Threlfall	The Life and Adventures of Nicholas Nickleby	Smike	
1983 (37th)
1983 (37th)	Matthew Broderick	Brighton Beach Memoirs	Eugene Jerome	
1983 (37th)	Željko Ivanek	Brighton Beach Memoirs	Stanley Jerome	
1983 (37th)	George N. Martin	Plenty	Leonard Darwin	
1983 (37th)	Stephen Moore	All's Well That Ends Well	Captain Parolles	
1984 (38th)
1984 (38th)	Joe Mantegna	Glengarry Glen Ross	Richard Roma	
1984 (38th)	Philip Bosco	Heartbreak House	Boss Mangan	
1984 (38th)	Robert Prosky	Glengarry Glen Ross	Shelly Levene	
1984 (38th)	Douglas Seale	Noises Off	Selsdon Mowbray	
1985 (39th)
1985 (39th)	Barry Miller	Biloxi Blues	Arnold Epstein	
1985 (39th)	Charles S. Dutton	Ma Rainey's Black Bottom	Levee	
1985 (39th)	William Hurt	Hurlyburly	Eddie	
1985 (39th)	Edward Petherbridge	Strange Interlude	Charles Marsden	
1986 (40th)
1986 (40th)	John Mahoney	The House of Blue Leaves	Artie Shaughnessy	
1986 (40th)	Peter Gallagher	Long Day's Journey into Night	Edmund Tyrone	
1986 (40th)	Charles Keating	Loot	McLeavy	
1986 (40th)	Joseph Maher	Loot	Truscott	
1987 (41st)
1987 (41st)	John Randolph	Broadway Bound	Ben	
1987 (41st)	Frankie R. Faison	Fences	Gabriel Maxson	
1987 (41st)	Jamey Sheridan	All My Sons	Chris Keller	
1987 (41st)	Courtney B. Vance	Fences	Cory Maxson	
1988 (42nd)
1988 (42nd)	BD Wong	M. Butterfly	Song Liling	
1988 (42nd)	Michael Gough	Breaking the Code	Dillwyn Knox	
1988 (42nd)	Lou Liberatore	Burn This	Larry	
1988 (42nd)	Delroy Lindo	Joe Turner's Come and Gone	Herald Loomis	
1989 (43rd)
1989 (43rd)	Boyd Gaines	The Heidi Chronicles	Peter Patrone	
1989 (43rd)	Peter Frechette	Eastern Standard	Drew	
1989 (43rd)	Eric Stoltz	Our Town	George Gibbs	
1989 (43rd)	Gordon Joseph Weiss	Ghetto	The Dummy	

=== 1990s ===
Year	Actor	Project	Role(s)	Ref.
1990 (44th)
1990 (44th)	Charles Durning	Cat on a Hot Tin Roof	Big Daddy	
1990 (44th)	Rocky Carroll	The Piano Lesson	Lymon	
1990 (44th)	Terry Kinney	The Grapes of Wrath	Jim Casy	
1990 (44th)	Gary Sinise	The Grapes of Wrath	Tom Joad	
1991 (45th)
1991 (45th)	Kevin Spacey	Lost in Yonkers	Louie Kurnitz	
1991 (45th)	Adam Arkin	I Hate Hamlet	Gary Peter Lefkowitz	
1991 (45th)	Dylan Baker	La Bête	Prince County	
1991 (45th)	Stephen Lang	The Speed of Darkness	Lou	
1992 (46th)
1992 (46th)	Laurence Fishburne	Two Trains Running	Sterling	
1992 (46th)	Roscoe Lee Browne	Two Trains Running	Holloway	
1992 (46th)	Željko Ivanek	Two Shakespearean Actors	John Ryder	
1992 (46th)	Tony Shalhoub	Conversations with My Father	Charlie	
1993 (47th)
1993 (47th)	Stephen Spinella	Angels in America: Millennium Approaches	Prior Walter, et al.	
1993 (47th)	Robert Sean Leonard	Candida	Eugene Marchbanks	
1993 (47th)	Joe Mantello	Angels in America: Millennium Approaches	Louis Ironson	
1993 (47th)	Zakes Mokae	The Song of Jacob Zulu	Rev. Zulu/Mr. X, Itshe	
1994 (48th)
1994 (48th)	Jeffrey Wright	Angels in America: Perestroika	Norman "Belize" Arriaga, et al.	
1994 (48th)	Larry Bryggman	Picnic	Howard Bevans	
1994 (48th)	David Marshall Grant	Angels in America: Perestroika	Joe Pitt, et al.	
1994 (48th)	Gregory Itzin	The Kentucky Cycle	Various Characters	
1995 (49th)
1995 (49th)	John Glover	Love! Valour! Compassion!	John and James Jeckyll	
1995 (49th)	Stephen Bogardus	Love! Valour! Compassion!	Gregory Mitchell	
1995 (49th)	Anthony Heald	Love! Valour! Compassion!	Perry Sellars	
1995 (49th)	Jude Law	Indiscretions	Michael	
1996 (50th)
1996 (50th)	Ruben Santiago-Hudson	Seven Guitars	Canewell	
1996 (50th)	James Gammon	Buried Child	Dodge	
1996 (50th)	Roger Robinson	Seven Guitars	Hedley	
1996 (50th)	Reg Rogers	Holiday	Ned Seton	
1997 (51st)
1997 (51st)	Owen Teale	A Doll's House	Torvald Helmer	
1997 (51st)	Terry Beaver	The Last Night of Ballyhoo	Adolph	
1997 (51st)	Brian Murray	The Little Foxes	Oscar	
1997 (51st)	Biff McGuire	The Young Man from Atlanta	Pete Davenport	
1998 (52nd)
1998 (52nd)	Tom Murphy	The Beauty Queen of Leenane	Ray Dooley	
1998 (52nd)	Brían F. O'Byrne	The Beauty Queen of Leenane	Pato Dooley	
1998 (52nd)	Sam Trammell	Ah, Wilderness!	Richard Miller	
1998 (52nd)	Max Wright	Ivanov	Pavel Lebedev	
1999 (53rd)
1999 (53rd)	Frank Wood	Side Man	Gene	
1999 (53rd)	Kevin Anderson	Death of a Salesman	Biff Loman	
1999 (53rd)	Finbar Lynch	Not About Nightingales	Jim Allison	
1999 (53rd)	Howard Witt	Death of a Salesman	Charley	

=== 2000s ===
Year	Actor	Project	Role(s)	Ref.
2000 (54th)
2000 (54th)	Roy Dotrice	A Moon for the Misbegotten	Phil Hogan	
2000 (54th)	Kevin Chamberlin	Dirty Blonde	Various Characters	
2000 (54th)	Daniel Davis	Wrong Mountain	Maurice Montesor	
2000 (54th)	Derek Smith	The Green Bird	Tartaglia	
2000 (54th)	Bob Stillman	Dirty Blonde	Various Characters	
2001 (55th)
2001 (55th)	Robert Sean Leonard	The Invention of Love	A. E. Housman, ages 18 to 26	
2001 (55th)	Charles Brown	King Hedley II	Elmore	
2001 (55th)	Larry Bryggman	Proof	Robert	
2001 (55th)	Michael Hayden	Judgment at Nuremberg	Oscar Rolfe	
2001 (55th)	Ben Shenkman	Proof	Hal	
2002 (56th)
2002 (56th)	Frank Langella	Fortune's Fool	Flegont Alexandrovitch Tropatchov	
2002 (56th)	Brian Murray	The Crucible	Deputy-Governor Danforth	
2002 (56th)	William Biff McGuire	Morning's at Seven	Theodore Swanson	
2002 (56th)	Sam Robards	The Man Who Had All the Luck	Gustav Eberson	
2002 (56th)	Stephen Tobolowsky	Morning's at Seven	Homer Bolton	
2003 (57th)
2003 (57th)	Denis O'Hare	Take Me Out	Mason Marzac	
2003 (57th)	Thomas Jefferson Byrd	Ma Rainey's Black Bottom	Toledo	
2003 (57th)	Philip Seymour Hoffman	Long Day's Journey into Night	James Tyrone Jr.	
2003 (57th)	Robert Sean Leonard	Long Day's Journey into Night	Edmund Tyrone	
2003 (57th)	Daniel Sunjata	Take Me Out	Darren Lemming	
2004 (58th)
2004 (58th)	Brían F. O'Byrne	Frozen	Ralph	
2004 (58th)	Tom Aldredge	Twentieth Century	Matthew Clark	
2004 (58th)	Ben Chaplin	The Retreat from Moscow	Jamie	
2004 (58th)	Aidan Gillen	The Caretaker	Mick	
2004 (58th)	Omar Metwally	Sixteen Wounded	Mahmoud	
2005 (59th)
2005 (59th)	Liev Schreiber	Glengarry Glen Ross	Richard Roma	
2005 (59th)	Alan Alda	Glengarry Glen Ross	Shelly Levene	
2005 (59th)	Gordon Clapp	Glengarry Glen Ross	Moss	
2005 (59th)	David Harbour	Who's Afraid of Virginia Woolf?	Nick	
2005 (59th)	Michael Stuhlbarg	The Pillowman	Michael	
2006 (60th)
2006 (60th)	Ian McDiarmid	Faith Healer	Teddy	
2006 (60th)	Samuel Barnett	The History Boys	Posner	
2006 (60th)	Domhnall Gleeson	The Lieutenant of Inishmore	Davey	
2006 (60th)	Mark Ruffalo	Awake and Sing!	Moe Axelrod	
2006 (60th)	Pablo Schreiber	Awake and Sing!	Ralph Berger	
2007 (61st)
2007 (61st)	Billy Crudup	The Coast of Utopia	Vissarion Belinsky	
2007 (61st)	Anthony Chisholm	Radio Golf	Elder Joseph Barlow	
2007 (61st)	Ethan Hawke	The Coast of Utopia	Michael Bakunin	
2007 (61st)	John Earl Jelks	Radio Golf	Sterling Johnson	
2007 (61st)	Stark Sands	Journey's End	Lieut. Raleigh	
2008 (62nd)
2008 (62nd)	Jim Norton	The Seafarer	Richard Harkin	
2008 (62nd)	Bobby Cannavale	Mauritius	Dennis	
2008 (62nd)	Raúl Esparza	The Homecoming	Lenny	
2008 (62nd)	Conleth Hill	The Seafarer	Ivan Curry	
2008 (62nd)	David Pittu	Is He Dead?	Various Characters	
2009 (63rd)
2009 (63rd)	Roger Robinson	Joe Turner's Come and Gone	Bynum Walker	
2009 (63rd)	John Glover	Waiting for Godot	Lucky	
2009 (63rd)	Zach Grenier	33 Variations	Beethoven	
2009 (63rd)	Stephen Mangan	The Norman Conquests	Norman	
2009 (63rd)	Paul Ritter	The Norman Conquests	Reg	

=== 2010s ===
Year	Actor	Project	Role(s)	Ref.
2010 (64th)
2010 (64th)	Eddie Redmayne	Red	Ken	
2010 (64th)	David Alan Grier	Race	Henry Brown	
2010 (64th)	Stephen Henderson	Fences	Jim Bono	
2010 (64th)	Jon Michael Hill	Superior Donuts	Franco	
2010 (64th)	Stephen Kunken	Enron	Andy Fastow	
2011 (65th)
2011 (65th)	John Benjamin Hickey	The Normal Heart	Felix Turner	
2011 (65th)	Mackenzie Crook	Jerusalem	Ginger	
2011 (65th)	Billy Crudup	Arcadia	Bernard Nightingale	
2011 (65th)	Arian Moayed	Bengal Tiger at the Baghdad Zoo	Musa	
2011 (65th)	Yul Vázquez	The Motherfucker with the Hat	Cousin Julio	
2012 (66th)
2012 (66th)	Christian Borle	Peter and the Starcatcher	Black Stache	
2012 (66th)	Michael Cumpsty	End of the Rainbow	Anthony	
2012 (66th)	Tom Edden	One Man, Two Guvnors	Alfie	
2012 (66th)	Andrew Garfield	Death of a Salesman	Biff Loman	
2012 (66th)	Jeremy Shamos	Clybourne Park	Karl / Steve	
2013 (67th)
2013 (67th)	Courtney B. Vance	Lucky Guy	Hap Hairston	
2013 (67th)	Danny Burstein	Golden Boy	Tokio	
2013 (67th)	Richard Kind	The Big Knife	Marcus Hoff	
2013 (67th)	Billy Magnussen	Vanya and Sonia and Masha and Spike	Spike	
2013 (67th)	Tony Shalhoub	Golden Boy	Mr. Bonaparte	
2014 (68th)
2014 (68th)	Mark Rylance	Twelfth Night	Countess Olivia	
2014 (68th)	Reed Birney	Casa Valentina	Charlotte	
2014 (68th)	Paul Chahidi	Twelfth Night	Maria	
2014 (68th)	Stephen Fry	Twelfth Night	Malvolio	
2014 (68th)	Brian J. Smith	The Glass Menagerie	Jim O'Connor	
2015 (69th)
2015 (69th)	Richard McCabe	The Audience	Harold Wilson	
2015 (69th)	Matthew Beard	Skylight	Edward Sergeant	
2015 (69th)	K. Todd Freeman	Airline Highway	Sissy Na Na	
2015 (69th)	Alessandro Nivola	The Elephant Man	Frederick Treves	
2015 (69th)	Nathaniel Parker	Wolf Hall Parts One & Two	Henry VIII	
2015 (69th)	Micah Stock	It's Only a Play	Gus P. Head	
2016 (70th)
2016 (70th)	Reed Birney	The Humans	Erik Blake	
2016 (70th)	Bill Camp	The Crucible	Reverend John Hale	
2016 (70th)	David Furr	Noises Off	Gary Lejeune	
2016 (70th)	Richard Goulding	King Charles III	Prince Harry	
2016 (70th)	Michael Shannon	Long Day's Journey into Night	James Tyrone Jr.	
2017 (71st)
2017 (71st)	Michael Aronov	Oslo	Uri Savir	
2017 (71st)	Danny DeVito	The Price	Gregory Solomon	
2017 (71st)	Nathan Lane	The Front Page	Walter Burns	
2017 (71st)	Richard Thomas	The Little Foxes	Horace Giddens	
2017 (71st)	John Douglas Thompson	Jitney	Jim Becker	
2018 (72nd)
2018 (72nd)	Nathan Lane	Angels in America	Roy Cohn, et al.	
2018 (72nd)	Anthony Boyle	Harry Potter and the Cursed Child	Scorpius Malfoy	
2018 (72nd)	Michael Cera	Lobby Hero	Jeff	
2018 (72nd)	Brian Tyree Henry	Lobby Hero	William	
2018 (72nd)	David Morse	The Iceman Cometh	Larry Slade	
2019 (73rd)
2019 (73rd)	Bertie Carvel	Ink	Rupert Murdoch	
2019 (73rd)	Robin de Jesús	The Boys in the Band	Emory	
2019 (73rd)	Gideon Glick	To Kill a Mockingbird	Dill Harris	
2019 (73rd)	Brandon Uranowitz	Burn This	Larry	
2019 (73rd)	Benjamin Walker	All My Sons	Chris Keller	

=== 2020s ===
Year	Actor	Project	Role(s)	Ref.
2020 (74th)
2020 (74th)	David Alan Grier	A Soldier's Play	Sergeant Vernon C. Waters	
2020 (74th)	Ato Blankson-Wood	Slave Play	Gary	
2020 (74th)	James Cusati-Moyer	Slave Play	Dustin	
2020 (74th)	John Benjamin Hickey	The Inheritance	Henry Wilcox	
2020 (74th)	Paul Hilton	The Inheritance	Walter Poole / Morgan	
2022 (75th)
2022 (75th)	Jesse Tyler Ferguson	Take Me Out	Mason Marzac	
2022 (75th)	Alfie Allen	Hangmen	Mooney	
2022 (75th)	Chuck Cooper	Trouble in Mind	Sheldon Forrester	
2022 (75th)	Ron Cephas Jones	Clyde's	Montrellous	
2022 (75th)	Michael Oberholtzer	Take Me Out	Shane Mungitt	
2022 (75th)	Jesse Williams	Take Me Out	Darren Lemming	
2023 (76th)
2023 (76th)	Brandon Uranowitz	Leopoldstadt	Ludwig Jakobovicz / Nathan Fischbein	
2023 (76th)	Jordan E. Cooper	Ain't No Mo'	Peaches	
2023 (76th)	Samuel L. Jackson	The Piano Lesson	Doaker Charles	
2023 (76th)	Arian Moayed	A Doll's House	Torvald Helmer	
2023 (76th)	David Zayas	Cost of Living	Eddie	
2024 (77th)
2024 (77th)	Will Brill	Stereophonic	Reg	
2024 (77th)	Eli Gelb	Stereophonic	Grover	
2024 (77th)	Tom Pecinka	Stereophonic	Peter	
2024 (77th)	Jim Parsons	Mother Play	Carl	
2024 (77th)	Corey Stoll	Appropriate	Beauregard "Bo" Lafayette	
2025 (78th)
2025 (78th)	Francis Jue	Yellow Face	HYH	
2025 (78th)	Glenn Davis	Purpose	Solomon "Junior" Jasper	
2025 (78th)	Gabriel Ebert	John Proctor Is the Villain	Mr. Carter Smith	
2025 (78th)	Bob Odenkirk	Glengarry Glen Ross	Shelly Levene	
2025 (78th)	Conrad Ricamora	Oh, Mary!	Mary's Husband	
2026 (79th)
2026 (79th)	Alden Ehrenreich	Becky Shaw	Max Garrett	
2026 (79th)	Christopher Abbott	Death of a Salesman	Biff Loman	
2026 (79th)	Danny Burstein	Marjorie Prime	Jon	
2026 (79th)	Brandon J. Dirden	Waiting for Godot	Pozzo	
2026 (79th)	Ruben Santiago-Hudson	Joe Turner's Come and Gone	Bynum Walker	
2026 (79th)	Richard Thomas	The Balusters	Elliot Emerson	

== Most wins ==
2 wins

- Frank Langella

== Most nominations ==
3 nominations

- Robert Sean Leonard
- Joseph Maher
- Brian Murray

2 nominations

- Tom Aldredge
- Reed Birney
- Philip Bosco
- Larry Bryggman
- Danny Burstein
- Billy Crudup
- John Glover
- Michael Gough
- David Alan Grier
- George Grizzard
- John Benjamin Hickey
- Željko Ivanek
- Nathan Lane
- Frank Langella
- Walter Matthau
- Biff McGuire
- Arian Moayed
- Zakes Mokae
- Brían F. O'Byrne
- Edward Petherbridge
- Roger Robinson
- Ruben Santiago-Hudson
- Tony Shalhoub
- Richard Thomas
- Brandon Uranowitz
- Courtney B. Vance
- Dick Anthony Williams

== Character win total ==
2 wins

- Phil Hogan from A Moon for the Misbegotten
- Richard Roma from Glengarry Glen Ross
- Mason Marzac from Take Me Out

== Character nomination total ==
4 nominations

- Biff Loman from Death of a Salesman

3 nominations

- Shelley Levene from Glengarry Glen Ross
- James Tyrone, Jr. from Long Day's Journey into Night

2 nominations

- Homer Bolton from Morning's at Seven
- Horace Giddens from The Little Foxes
- Torvald Helmer from A Doll's House
- Phil Hogan from A Moon for the Misbegotten
- Chris Keller from All My Sons
- Darren Lemming from Take Me Out
- Larry from Burn This
- Lenny from The Homecoming
- Mason Marzac from Take Me Out
- Richard Roma from Glengarry Glen Ross
- Edmund Tyrone from Long Day's Journey into Night
- Bynum Walker from Joe Turner's Come and Gone

== Productions with multiple nominations ==
boldface=Winner

- Big Fish, Little Fish – **Martin Gabel** and George Grizzard
- The Subject Was Roses – **Jack Albertson** and Martin Sheen
- Rosencrantz and Guildenstern Are Dead – Paul Hecht, Brian Murray, and John Wood
- Vivat! Vivat Regina! – Douglas Rain and Lee Richardson
- The Life and Adventures of Nicholas Nickleby – Edward Petherbridge and David Threlfall
- Brighton Beach Memoirs – **Matthew Broderick** and Željko Ivanek
- Glengarry Glen Ross – **Joe Mantegna** and Robert Prosky
- Loot – Charles Keating and Joseph Maher
- The Grapes of Wrath – Terry Kinney and Gary Sinise
- Two Trains Running – **Laurence Fishburne** and Roscoe Lee Browne
- Angels in America: Millennium Approaches – Joe Mantello and **Stephen Spinella**
- Angels in America: Perestroika – David Marshall Grant and **Jeffrey Wright**
- Love! Valour! Compassion! – Stephen Bogardus, **John Glover** and Anthony Heald
- Seven Guitars – Roger Robinson and **Ruben Santiago-Hudson**
- The Beauty Queen of Leenane – Tom Murphy and Brían F. O'Byrne
- Death of a Salesman – Kevin Anderson and Howard Witt
- Dirty Blonde – Kevin Chamberlin and Bob Stillman
- Proof – Larry Bryggman and Ben Shenkman
- Morning's at Seven – William Biff McGuire and Stephen Tobolowsky
- Long Day's Journey into Night – Philip Seymour Hoffman and Robert Sean Leonard
- Take Me Out – **Denis O'Hare** and Daniel Sunjata
- Glengarry Glen Ross – Alan Alda, Gordon Clapp and **Liev Schreiber**
- Awake and Sing! – Mark Ruffalo and Pablo Schreiber
- The Coast of Utopia – **Billy Crudup** and Ethan Hawke
- Radio Golf – Anthony Chisholm and John Earl Jelks
- The Seafarer – Conleth Hill and Jim Norton
- The Norman Conquests – Stephen Mangan and Paul Ritter
- Golden Boy – Danny Burstein and Tony Shalhoub
- Twelfth Night – Paul Chahidi, Stephen Fry and **Mark Rylance**
- Lobby Hero – Michael Cera and Brian Tyree Henry
- The Inheritance – John Benjamin Hickey and Paul Hilton
- Slave Play – Ato Blankson-Wood and James Cusati-Moyer
- Take Me Out – **Jesse Tyler Ferguson**, Michael Oberholtzer and Jesse Williams
- Stereophonic – **Will Brill**, Eli Gelb and Tom Pecinka

== Multiple awards and nominations ==
Actors who have been nominated multiple times in any acting categories

Awards	Nominations	Recipient
4	7	Frank Langella
4	5	Boyd Gaines
3	7	Nathan Lane
3	7	John Lithgow
3	5	Mark Rylance
3	4	Kevin Kline
3	4	Zero Mostel
3	3	Hinton Battle
2	7	Christopher Plummer
2	6	Michael Cerveris
2	5	Christian Borle
2	5	George Hearn
2	5	George Rose
2	5	John Cullum
2	5	Robert Morse
2	4	James Earl Jones
2	4	Norbert Leo Butz
2	4	Richard Kiley
2	3	Al Pacino
2	3	David Burns
2	3	David Wayne
2	3	Fredric March
2	3	Judd Hirsch
2	3	Matthew Broderick
2	3	Phil Silvers
2	3	Rex Harrison
2	3	Robert Preston
2	3	Stephen Spinella
2	3	Walter Matthau
2	2	Alan Bates
2	2	Brian Dennehy
2	2	Bryan Cranston
2	2	Harvey Fierstein
2	2	Hiram Sherman
2	2	James Naughton
2	2	Jonathan Pryce
2	2	José Ferrer
2	2	Russell Nype
2	2	Tommy Tune
1	9	Danny Burstein
1	8	Jason Robards
1	7	Brian Bedford
1	6	Philip Bosco
1	5	Brandon Uranowitz
1	5	Brían F. O'Byrne
1	5	Hume Cronyn
1	5	Jim Dale
1	4	André De Shields
1	4	Billy Crudup
1	4	Brian Stokes Mitchell
1	4	Cyril Ritchard
1	4	David Alan Grier
1	4	Gregory Hines
1	4	Jack Cassidy
1	4	Joel Grey
1	4	Jonathan Groff
1	4	Joshua Henry
1	4	Liev Schreiber
1	4	René Auberjonois
1	4	Tony Shalhoub
1	3	Alfred Drake
1	3	Barry Bostwick
1	3	Courtney B. Vance
1	3	David Hyde Pierce
1	3	Gary Beach
1	3	Gavin Creel
1	3	George Grizzard
1	3	Jefferson Mays
1	3	Jerry Orbach
1	3	John Wood
1	3	Larry Blyden
1	3	Len Cariou
1	3	Mandy Patinkin
1	3	Michael Rupert
1	3	Richard Burton
1	3	Robert Sean Leonard
1	3	Roger Bart
1	3	Ruben Santiago-Hudson
1	3	Scott Wise
1	2	Alfred Lunt
1	2	Andrew Garfield
1	2	Barnard Hughes
1	2	Ben Vereen
1	2	Ben Platt
1	2	Bert Lahr
1	2	Bertie Carvel
1	2	Bill Irwin
1	2	Brent Carver
1	2	Charles Nelson Reilly
1	2	Chuck Cooper
1	2	Cleavant Derricks
1	2	Cliff Gorman
1	2	Daniel Radcliffe
1	2	Denzel Washington
1	2	Derek Jacobi
1	2	Eddie Redmayne
1	2	Edward Herrmann
1	2	Fritz Weaver
1	2	Gabriel Ebert
1	2	George S. Irving
1	2	Henry Fonda
1	2	Hugh Jackman
1	2	Ian McKellen
1	2	Jack Albertson
1	2	James Monroe Iglehart
1	2	Jeffrey Wright
1	2	John Benjamin Hickey
1	2	John Glover
1	2	Kevin Spacey
1	2	Laurence Fishburne
1	2	Leslie Odom Jr.
1	2	Martin Short
1	2	Michael Gough
1	2	Michael McGrath
1	2	Paul Rogers
1	2	Ralph Fiennes
1	2	Ray Bolger
1	2	Reed Birney
1	2	Roger Rees
1	2	Roger Robinson
1	2	Ron Holgate
1	2	Roy Dotrice
1	2	Santino Fontana
1	2	Sean Hayes
1	2	Simon Russell Beale
1	2	Sydney Chaplin
1	2	Zakes Mokae

Nominations	Recipient
5	Brian d'Arcy James
5	George C. Scott
5	John McMartin
5	Tom Aldredge
4	Donald Pleasence
4	Gregg Edelman
4	Raúl Esparza
4	Raul Julia
4	Victor Garber
3	Alan Alda
3	Alec McCowen
3	Alfred Molina
3	Andy Karl
3	Ben Gazzara
3	Brandon Victor Dixon
3	Brian Murray
3	Brooks Ashmanskas
3	Christopher Fitzgerald
3	Gilbert Price
3	Harry Groener
3	Jeff Daniels
3	Joseph Maher
3	Joshua Henry
3	Kevin Chamberlin
3	Marc Kudisch
3	Philip Seymour Hoffman
3	Ralph Richardson
3	Robin de Jesús
3	Terrence Mann
3	Tim Curry
3	Željko Ivanek
2	Adam Godley
2	Alan Rickman
2	Albert Finney
2	Alex Brightman
2	Andrew Rannells
2	Andy Griffith
2	Anthony Heald
2	Anthony Perkins
2	Arian Moayed
2	Biff McGuire
2	Bob Gunton
2	Bobby Cannavale
2	Brad Oscar
2	Bruce Adler
2	Bryce Pinkham
2	Charles Brown
2	Charles S. Dutton
2	Christopher Sieber
2	Christopher Walken
2	Clive Revill
2	Conleth Hill
2	Corey Hawkins
2	David Carroll
2	David Morse
2	David Pittu
2	David Threlfall
2	Dick Anthony Williams
2	Donald Moffat
2	Edward Petherbridge
2	Edward Winter
2	Gabriel Byrne
2	Gary Sinise
2	Gavin Lee
2	Herschel Bernardi
2	Howard McGillin
2	Jack Gilford
2	Jack Lemmon
2	Jeremy Jordan
2	Jeremy Pope
2	Joe Mantello
2	Joel Blum
2	John Gielgud
2	Jon Michael Hill
2	Josh Groban
2	Jude Law
2	K. Todd Freeman
2	Keith Carradine
2	Larry Bryggman
2	Larry Haines
2	Lewis J. Stadlen
2	Liam Neeson
2	Lin-Manuel Miranda
2	Mark Strong
2	Maurice Evans
2	Maurice Hines
2	Michael Stuhlbarg
2	Milo O'Shea
2	Nicol Williamson
2	Patrick Wilson
2	Peter Frechette
2	Richard Thomas
2	Rob McClure
2	Robert Prosky
2	Robert Weede
2	Samuel Barnett
2	Samuel E. Wright
2	Savion Glover
2	Stark Sands
2	Stephen McKinley Henderson
2	Theodore Bikel
2	Tom Courtenay
2	Tom Sturridge
2	Tom Wopat
2	Tony Roberts
2	Wilfrid Hyde-White

== Trivia ==
- A supporting actor in each of Neil Simon's Eugene trilogy (Brighton Beach Memoirs, Biloxi Blues and Broadway Bound) has taken the Tony.
- Featured actors in both parts of the original production and the 2018 revival of Tony Kushner's Angels in America series have won the award.
- Matthew Broderick currently holds the record for the youngest person to ever receive this award, at 21 years old.
- Roy Dotrice currently holds the record for the oldest person to ever receive this award, at 77 years old.

== See also ==
- Dorian Award for Outstanding Featured Performance in a Broadway Play
- Drama Desk Award for Outstanding Featured Actor in a Play
- Drama Desk Award for Outstanding Featured Performance in a Play
- Drama League Award for Distinguished Performance
- Laurence Olivier Award for Best Actor in a Supporting Role
- Lists of acting awards
- List of awards for supporting actor
- Outer Critics Circle Award for Outstanding Featured Performer in a Broadway Play
