= Versus de unibove =

The Versus de unibove, also known as Unibos, Einochs or One-Ox, is a Latin poem in 864 lines that recounts the comic story of a poor farmer known as Unibos, or 'One-Ox', who stumbles across a buried treasure.

The poem survives only in one eleventh-century manuscript, now held in the Royal Library of Belgium in Brussels, with the shelfmark MS 10078-95. This manuscript, which also contains astronomical and other educational texts, was written in the monastery of Gembloux.

The Latin poem is generally thought to be the written version of an older oral story. Later versions of the same story were collected by the Brothers Grimm, and folklorists have categorised it as an example of 'The Little Peasant' tale.

The poem has been analysed in different ways: as a peasant folktale, as an early example of a fabliau, and as evidence for commercialisation.

== Editions ==
La beffa di Unibos, ed. Ferruccio Bertini and Francesco Mosetti Casaretto (2000)

== English translations ==
Marc Wolterbeek, 'Unibos: the earliest full-length fabliau (text and translation)', Comitatus, 16, (1985), 46-76

Jan Ziolkowski, Fairy Tales From Before Fairy Tales: The Medieval Latin Past of Wonderful Lies (Ann Arbor: The University of Michigan Press, 2012)

== Further references ==
Archives de litterature du Moyen Age, https://www.arlima.net/uz/unibos.html
