= The Little Peasant =

German fairy tale

Folk tale
- Name: The Little Peasant
- Aarne–Thompson grouping: ATU 1535, ATU 1737
- Country: Germany
- Published in: Grimms' Fairy Tales

"The Little Peasant" is a German fairy tale collected by the Brothers Grimm in Grimm's Fairy Tales, number 61.

It follows the Aarne-Thompson Index type 1535, The Rich Peasant and the Poor Peasant, and includes an episode of type 1737, Trading Places with the Trickster in a Sack. Other tales of this type include the Norwegian Big Peter and Little Peter from Norske Folkeeventyr collected by Peter Christen Asbjørnsen and Jørgen Moe, the Latin Versus de unibove, and Little Claus and Big Claus by Hans Christian Andersen.

== Synopsis ==
A poor peasant and his wife had not even a cow. They had a woodworker make them a calf of wood and brought it to the pasture. When the cowherd returned without it, they found it had been stolen and took him to court for his carelessness, and the judge made him give them a cow. They had nothing to feed it and so had to kill it. The peasant took the hide to town to sell. He found a raven with broken wings and wrapped it in the hide. Weather grew bad and he took shelter in a mill, where the miller's wife gave him some bread and cheese. Then the parson arrived, and because her husband was away, he and the wife had a feast. Her husband returned, and the wife hid the parson and the food. The peasant pretended that the hide was a soothsayer and made the raven croak. He told the miller where the food was hidden, and after they had eaten, that the Devil was in the parson's hiding place. The parson fled, and the miller gave the peasant 300 thalers.

Being rich now, he was brought before the mayor to account for his wealth; he said he had sold the hide. Others killed their cows but could not get much for them. They sentenced him to be rolled into the river in a barrel filled with holes. A shepherd came along, and the peasant declared that he would not do it, and explained that they were trying to force him to be mayor. The shepherd changed places with him, the peasant took his sheep, and they drowned the shepherd. Seeing him with the sheep later, they asked where he had acquired them, and he said they were in the river. Everyone jumped into the river and drowned, and the peasant was their sole heir and became rich.

== Adaptations ==
- Anne Sexton wrote an adaptation as a poem called "The Little Peasant" in her collection Transformations (1971), a book in which she re-envisions sixteen of the Grimm's Fairy tales.
