= The Pittsburgh Cycle =

Ten-play play cycle written by August Wilson

The Pittsburgh Cycle is a cycle of ten plays written by August Wilson. Also known as The American Century Cycle (or Century Cycle), each of the ten plays is set with a predominantly black cast in a different decade of the twentieth century. All but one—Ma Rainey's Black Bottom—take place in the historically black Hill District neighborhood in Pittsburgh, Pennsylvania.

The first entry in the cycle, Jitney, premiered in 1982. The last, Radio Golf, premiered in April 2005, shortly before Wilson's death that October. Eight of the plays transferred to Broadway in his lifetime, with Ma Rainey reaching Broadway in both 1984 and 2003. The cycle has earned a collective 72 Tony Award nominations and over 14 Broadway stagings. Five of the ten plays were finalists for the Pulitzer Prize for Drama, with Fences and The Piano Lesson each earning the award. Wilson is the only playwright to be a six-time Pulitzer finalist.

Wilson developed six of the plays with Lloyd Richards as director, frequently using the Eugene O'Neill Theater Center and the Yale Repertory Theatre—both of which featured Richards as artistic director—to workshop plays. Following a break in their relationship during the development of Seven Guitars, Wilson worked with multiple other directors, including Walter Dallas, Kenny Leon, and Marion McClinton. The plays in the cycle also provided early career breakthroughs for various actors, including Charles S. Dutton, Angela Bassett, Courtney B. Vance, Delroy Lindo, Laurence Fishburne, Viola Davis, Ruben Santiago-Hudson, LisaGay Hamilton, and S. Epatha Merkerson.

Three of the plays have been made into feature films, starting with Fences in 2016, Ma Rainey's Black Bottom in 2020, and The Piano Lesson in 2024. A TV film version of The Piano Lesson also aired in 1995 as a part of the Hallmark Hall of Fame series, starring Dutton and Alfre Woodard.

== Overview ==
In 1981, August Wilson was a struggling poet and playwright who lived in Saint Paul, Minnesota. He submitted versions of Jitney and the non-cycle play Black Bart and the Sacred Hills to the Eugene O'Neill Theater Center's National Playwright Conference multiple times starting in 1979. After five rejections, he wrote and submitted an early version of Ma Rainey's Black Bottom, which was accepted for the 1982 conference. O'Neill artistic director Lloyd Richards favored Wilson, allowing the influential New York Times theater critic Frank Rich to come review the plays-in-progress, despite the conference's ban on press criticism. Rich's rave about Ma Rainey boosted his career.

Over the successive two decades, the cycle's plays frequently debuted at the NPC workshop. In 1982, 1983, 1984, 1986, and 1993, he brought each of his new works in the cycle to the O'Neill center. After Wilson struggled to find a way to bring Ma Rainey to Broadway, Richards offered to direct a production at the Yale Repertory Theatre, where he also served as artistic director. Starting in 1984, Richards directed the plays' official world premieres at the Yale Repertory Theatre. With Fences and successive cycle plays, Richards would also direct stagings for different League of Resident Theaters non-profit theater companies, to allow Wilson the chance to rewrite and hone the plays before they reached Broadway. After a break with Richards in 1996, Wilson didn't return to the O'Neill until Richards's retirement, at which point Wilson worked on Gem of the Ocean as an invited playwright-in-residence. Likewise, when Richards retired from Yale Rep after his term as artistic director, Wilson didn't debut a new work there until his final play premiered in April 2005, shortly before his death that October. He worked with other directors as he developed his later work, especially Marion McClinton and Kenny Leon.

The ten plays are alternatively referred to as Wilson's Pittsburgh Cycle or as his American Century Cycle (or Century Cycle). Wilson first publicly spoke of the idea in November 1984 to The Pittsburgh Press, commenting that he was in the process of writing a play for each decade of the 1900s to "isolate the most important ideas that confronted blacks." In 1987, Wilson explained his inspiration for the project to The New York Times, saying that he felt black Americans had become disconnected from the traumas of slavery and other historical injustices. He contrasted the black cultural memory to the memory of slavery in Egypt, commemorated worldwide in celebrations of Passover. Wilson had also, in 1977, directed a production of In New England Winter, the second play from Ed Bullins's ultimately unfinished 20-play Twentieth Century Cycle about a group of mid-century black Americans. According to his biographer Patti Hartigan, Wilson felt that the writing was subpar and that he could do a better job of representing the black experience. In an essay from 2000, Wilson described his intentions behind the cycle:

The cycle of plays I have been writing since 1979 is my attempt to represent [black American] culture in dramatic art. From the beginning, I decided not to write about historical events or the pathologies of the black community. [...] Instead, I wanted to present the unique particulars of black American culture as the transformation of impulse and sensibility into codes of conduct and response, into cultural rituals that defined and celebrated ourselves as men and women of high purpose.

== Works ==
Year of premiere	Place of premiere	Title	Decade	Opened on Broadway
1982	Allegheny Repertory Theatre	Jitney	1970s	2017 – Samuel J. Friedman Theatre
1984	Yale Repertory Theatre†	Ma Rainey's Black Bottom	1920s	1984 – Cort Theatre
1985	Yale Repertory Theatre†	Fences	1950s	1987 – 46th Street Theatre
1986	Yale Repertory Theatre†	Joe Turner's Come and Gone	1910s	1988 – Ethel Barrymore
1987	Yale Repertory Theatre†	The Piano Lesson (Note: The Piano Lesson was a Pulitzer finalist in 1989 before it won the award in 1990)	1930s	1990 – Walter Kerr
1990	Yale Repertory Theatre	Two Trains Running	1960s	1992 – Walter Kerr
1995	Goodman Theatre†	Seven Guitars	1940s	1996 – Walter Kerr
1999	Pittsburgh Public Theater	King Hedley II	1980s	2001 – Virginia Theatre
2003	Goodman Theatre†	Gem of the Ocean	1900s	2004 – Walter Kerr
2005	Yale Repertory Theatre	Radio Golf	1990s	2007 – Cort Theatre

^{Notes:} † ^{Reflects works that were previously work-shopped at the Eugene O"Neill Theater Center}

Key
Pulitzer Prize for Drama winner
Pulitzer Prize for Drama finalist

=== Thematic connections ===
The question of individual worth persists throughout the cycle. In Ma Rainey, the black musicians are being subordinated by the white record company managers. In Seven Guitars, four musicians reflect on the senseless murder of their colleague. Herald Loomis, a major character in Joe Turner, is beset by trauma and depression following his seven-year stint on a Tennessee chain gang after being abducted by the titular Joe Turner; the play proceeds partly as Loomis's quest for serenity. In Gem, Citizen Barlow reproaches himself for his theft of a bucket of nails, weighing his own worth against the life of someone unjustly accused of his crime, before he embarks on a supernatural journey of spiritual healing.

Family conflicts recur throughout the cycle. In Jitney, one storyline concerns the relationship between Jim Backer and his troubled son Booster following his release from prison. Fences focuses on the Maxson family, especially patriarch Troy's reproachful attitude toward his son and his infidelity toward his wife Rose, which results in an illegitimate daughter. The primary conflict in The Piano Lesson is between siblings Berneice and Boy Willie, who disagree on whether to sell or preserve the titular family heirloom. King Hedley II features a monologue from the character Tonya to her husband Hedley, where she defends her decision to abort their potential child due to the hopelessness of their milieu.

The narratives throughout the cycle also track the course of real-life history. Characters in Gem and Joe Turner reflect the Great Migration, coming from Alabama or Tennessee, with Pittsburgh as a way-point to the North. The Piano Lesson and Seven Guitars meaningfully depict characters in the midst of the Great Depression and in the wake of World War II, respectively. The end of the color line in the MLB comes shortly before the events of Fences, which fuels the resentment of the main character who had played in the Negro leagues (the character, Troy Maxson, has been compared to Ray Dandridge). The play also features discussion of contemporary players like Jackie Robinson and Roberto Clemente in that context. The dialogue in Two Trains Running features references to the civil rights and black power movements, as well as local urban renewal. King Hedley II repeatedly comments on the failed promise of the Reagan era, especially for black Americans in cities. Lastly, Radio Golf centers on gentrification and growing (but complicated) black representation in politics.

==== Language ====
Each of the cycle's plays have been noted for their use of colloquial language and dialect. Critic Maya Philips referred to the vernacular dialogue as "one of the central ways Wilson's characters embody their stations in life, which can't be divorced from the diction, grammar and syntax they use with one another." Wilson wrote that his process for constructing the cycle often originated with a line of dialogue, which he would use to connect individual characters with a broader narrative. He also said that his dialogue was meant to preserve the "street talk" of people he knew growing up in Pittsburgh.

=== Recurring characters ===
Elder Joseph Barlow, from Radio Golf, is the son of Citizen Barlow and Black Mary, from Gem of the Ocean. He opposes the mayoral candidacy of Harmond Wilks, who is unknowingly the grandson of Caesar Wilks, the antagonist from Gem. The two characters fight over the demolition of Aunt Ester's house, a major setting in Gem.

Hedley from Seven Guitars is the father of the titular character in King Hedley II. The latter Hedley's mother, Ruby, is also in both plays. The Seven Guitars character Canewell reappears in King Hedley II as "Stool Pigeon," in reference to his betrayal of Hedley between the two plays.

==== Aunt Ester ====
The character Aunt Ester appears or is mentioned in four of the ten plays, starting with Two Trains Running. In that play, the characters speak about visiting her house at 1839 Wylie Avenue, in the Hill District, where she helps to cleanse their souls. In King Hedley II, it's revealed that she died at the age of 366. The plot of Radio Golf partly revolves around gentrification and the demolition of Aunt Ester's house.

The only play in which she appears onstage is Gem of the Ocean, where she plays a lead role. Ester, in that play, is 285 years old, having arrived in the country under enslavement with the first Africans in Virginia in 1619. In Gem, she helps cleanse the soul of the character Citizen Barlow, who feels guilt for a theft that resulted in the wrong person being accused and dying. Ester ushers Barlow through a memory of the Middle Passage and the so-called "City of Bones."

Academic Harry J. Elam Jr. argued in 2005 that Ester represented a bridge in the black community between Christianity and more traditional African strains of spirituality, representing a collective ancestor. Her death in King Hedley II reflects the growing disconnection in the 1980s between the community as a whole and its collective memory. In 2000, Wilson wrote about Ester's role in the broader cycle.

Aunt Ester has emerged for me as the most significant persona of the cycle. The characters, after all, are her children. The wisdom and tradition she embodies are valuable tools for the reconstruction of their personalities and for dealing with a society in which the contradictions, over the decades, have grown more fierce, and for exposing all the places it is lacking in virtue.

=== The Four B's ===
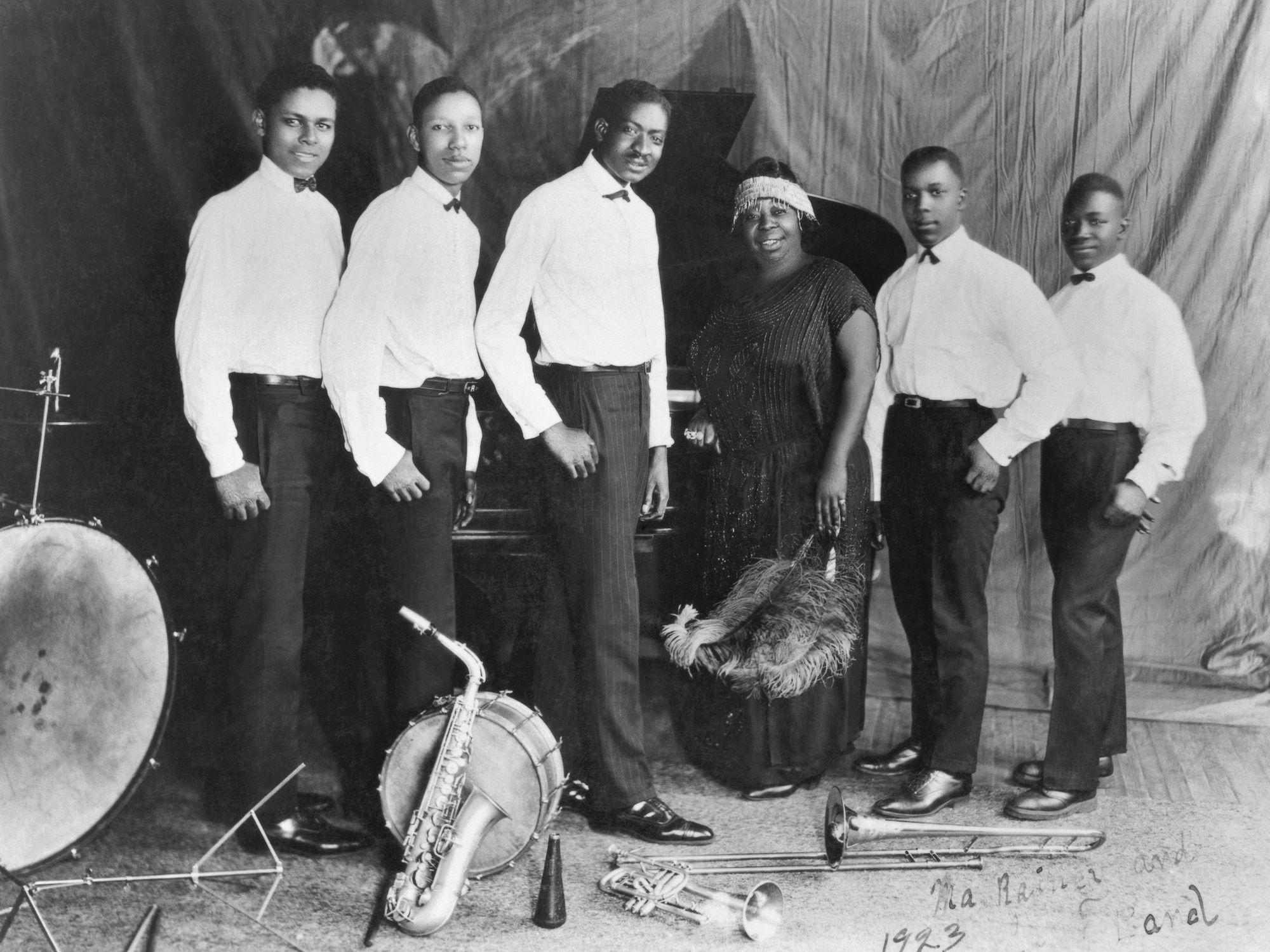
Blues singer Ma Rainey (center) with her band in 1923

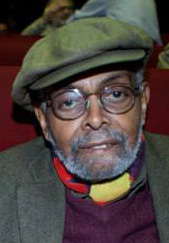
Poet-playwright Amiri Baraka in 2013

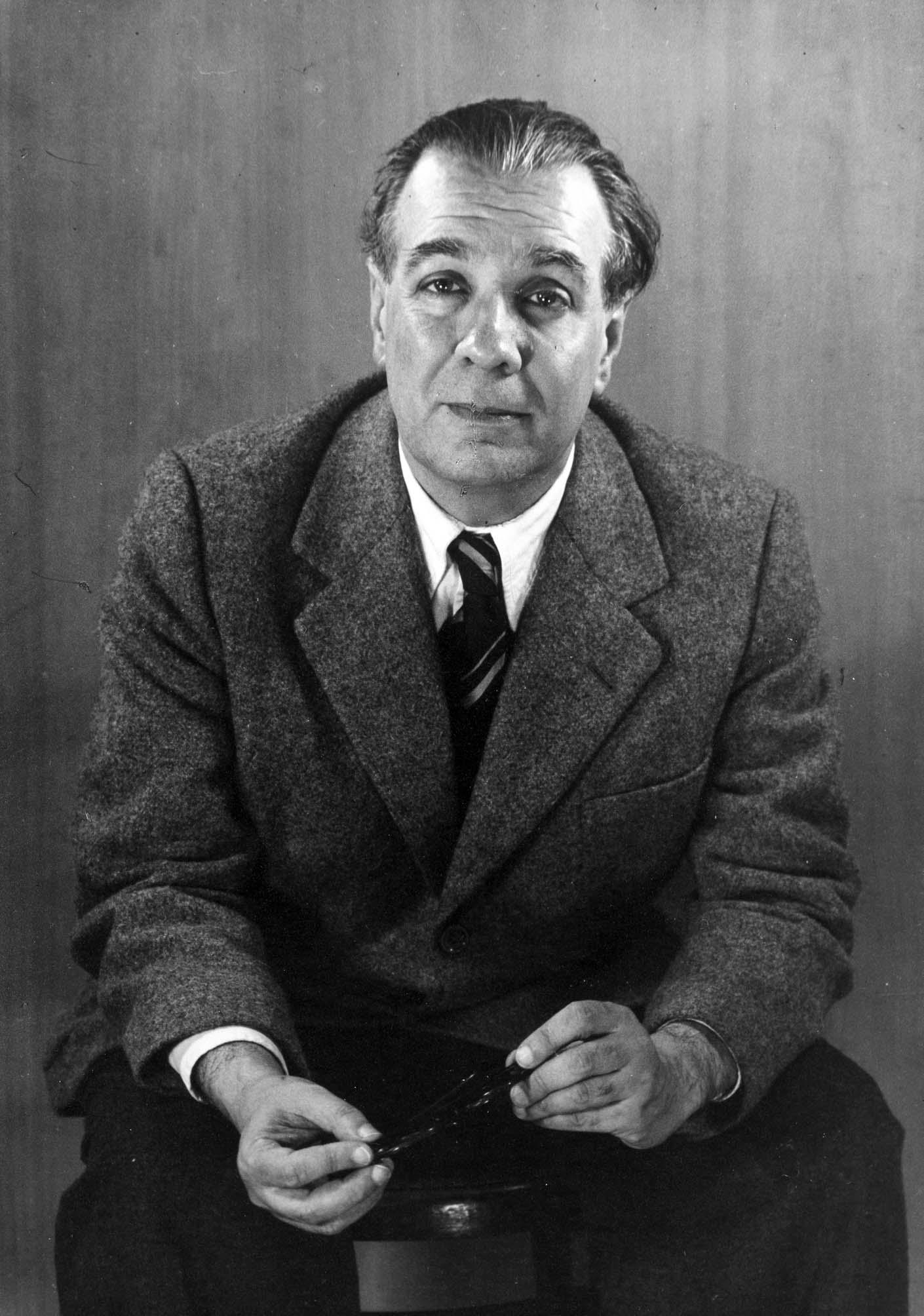
Argentine short story writer Jorge Luis Borges in 1951

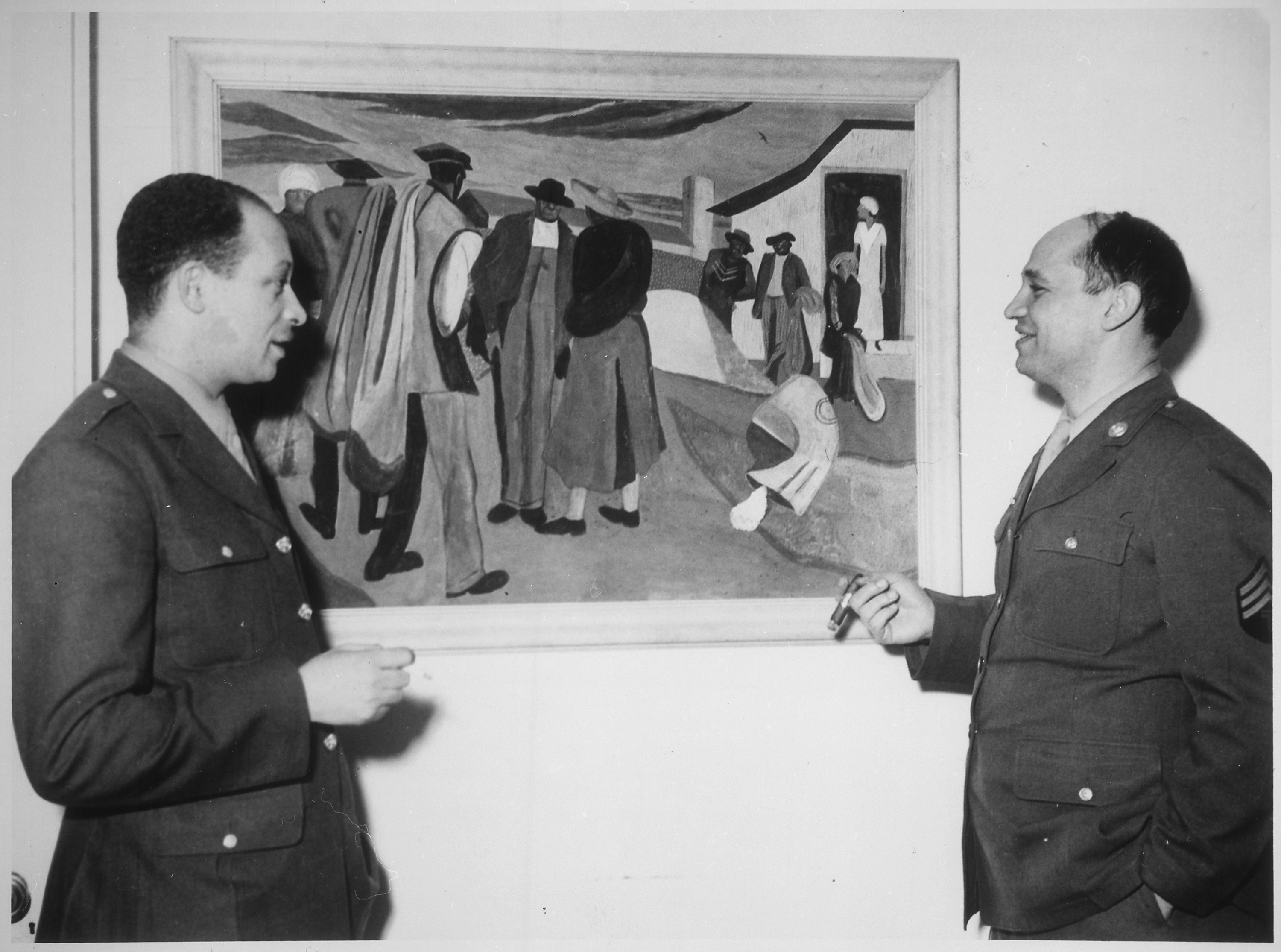
Artist Romare Bearden (right) with his painting "Cotton Widows" and cousin Charles Alston (left) in 1944

Wilson frequently spoke of his personal inspirations for the cycle as "The Four B's." These refer to blues music, the spiritual exploration of writer Jorge Luis Borges, the poetry and politics of critic Amiri Baraka, and the multi-media paintings of Romare Bearden.

Blues music was the primary element of the four, with Ma Rainey, The Piano Lesson, Seven Guitars, and King Hedley II featuring blues music or musicians. In her play, Ma Rainey refers to the blues as "life's way of talking." The characters in The Piano Lesson meld the relatively new musical style of blues with work songs and spirituals. In Seven Guitars, characters repeatedly reference both existing and original songs; the blues pioneer Buddy Bolden (and the Jelly Roll Morton song "Buddy Bolden Blues") recurs throughout. Academic Steven C. Tracy collected a "Bluesography" of Seven Guitars featuring the dozens of songs either referenced or sung throughout. King Hedley II, featuring characters from Seven Guitars, partly reflects the decline of the blues as a popular art.

Bearden's work provide direct inspiration for multiple plays in the cycle, after Wilson was introduced to the artist in 1977. Wilson developed Joe Turner after seeing Bearden's collage painting Mill Hand's Lunch Bucket, basing the character Herald Loomis on the despondent man in the center of the image. The Piano Lesson also arose out of a Bearden artwork titled The Piano Lesson (Homage to Mary Lou). Bearden's work indirectly influenced Wilson's other plays, holistically, with his goal to make the cycle "the equal of Bearden's canvases."

Baraka provided professional inspiration for Wilson, as a fellow poet-turned-playwright. After Baraka founded the Black Arts Repertory/Theater School (BARTS) in 1960s Harlem, Wilson and Rob Penny created their own version in Pittsburgh with the Black Horizon Theater. Wilson discovered Borges—based on his stories in The New Yorker—while constructing the cycle. The flashback structure of Seven Guitars was meant as an homage to Borges.

== Films ==
During its original Broadway run in 1987, Paramount purchased the rights to produce a film version of Fences for $500,000. Eddie Murphy was attached as the film's producer, with the notion that he would act as well. Paramount and Murphy negotiated with several directors—including Barry Levinson—but they could not find a proper fit. In a September 1990 op-ed for The New York Times, Wilson maintained that only a black director could properly interpret his play cycle.

At the time of my last meeting with Paramount, in January 1990, a well-known, highly respected white director wanted very much to direct the film. I don't know his work, but he is universally praised for sensitive and intelligent direction. I accept that he is a very fine film director. But he is not black. He is not a product of black American culture - a culture that was honed out of the black experience and fired in the kiln of slavery and survival - and he does not share the sensibilities of black Americans.

Wilson suggested various potential black directors, including Richards, Spike Lee, and Gordon Parks. Bill Duke was also considered as a possible candidate both parties could agree on. James Earl Jones expressed frustration at the impasse, which would ultimately result in him aging out of playing the starring role. By the late 1990s, Murphy had left the project and was replaced by Scott Rudin as lead producer, who later helped produce the 2016 version.

=== Denzel Washington partnership ===
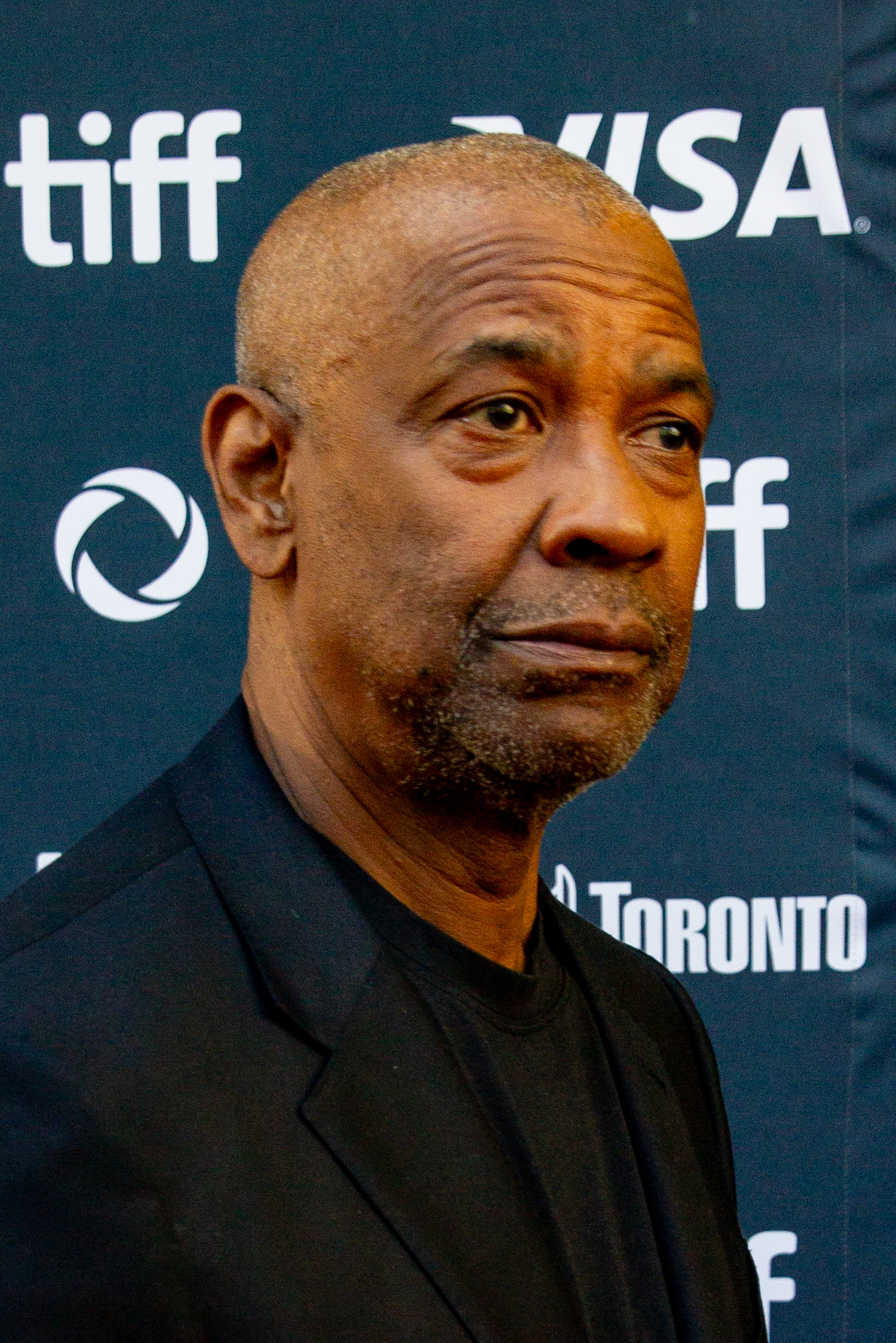
Denzel Washington at the Toronto International Film Festival for The Piano Lesson in 2024

In 2014, Wilson's widow and literary executor Constanza Romero approached actor Denzel Washington about creating a film for each of the plays of the cycle. Like the plays, Washington—and his producing partner Todd Black—decided to develop the films out of chronological order. The first two installations were filmed in Pittsburgh, but the third filmed in Atlanta.

In 2016, Washington directed the first installment, Fences, starring himself (as Troy), Viola Davis (as Rose), and Jovan Adepo (as Cory) in his film debut. Washington and Davis had both starred in a 2010 revival of the play, where they each received Tony Awards. Fences earned four Oscar nominations and won one for Davis's performance. Wilson received a posthumous nomination for Best Adapted Screenplay—based on screenplays he wrote for eventually unrealized projects in his lifetime—with Tony Kushner working as an uncredited consultant.

In 2020, George C. Wolfe directed the next installment, Ma Rainey's Black Bottom, starring Davis, Colman Domingo, Glynn Turman, Michael Potts, and Chadwick Boseman in his final film role. The film added a scene to the ending featuring an all-white band dully performing the work that Levee had written. Wolfe described the addition as a way to further communicate how the difficult work of black artists is often simplified and appropriated by white performers.

In 2024, Washington's son Malcolm Washington directed the most recent installment to date, of The Piano Lesson, starring his other son John David Washington (Boy Willie), Samuel L. Jackson (Doaker Charles), and Danielle Deadwyler (Berniece). Barry Jenkins was originally the choice to direct, but had prior attachments to Mufasa: The Lion King and The Underground Railroad. Deadwyler received nominations from the Screen Actors Guild Awards, the Critics Choice Awards, and the Indie Spirit Awards, where the film also earned a nomination in the Best First Feature category.

During the release of The Piano Lesson, Washington and Black said that they next planned to adapt Joe Turner's Come and Gone for film.

== Other versions ==
The Wilson estate allowed New York Public Radio to produce each of the ten plays in the cycle as successive dramatic readings in 2013. The readings were broadcast on the organization's radio station, WNYC, as well as other interested local stations, then maintained on the station's website until 2015. Ruben Santiago-Hudson and Stephen McKinley Henderson—who each featured in multiple original cycle productions on Broadway—led the project. Besides Santiago-Hudson and Henderson, directors for the individual readings included Kenny Leon, Phylicia Rashad, Michele Shay, and Marion McClinton.

In 2010, playwright Lorna Littleway adapted scenes from throughout the cycle into the dramatic revue August Wilson's Women. Littleway directed the production at the Nuyorican Poets Cafe in New York. It proceeds chronologically through the cycle, starting with monologues from Aunt Ester in Gem and ending with a scene from Radio Golf.

Multiple theater companies have programmed series that run through the cycle. The Kennedy Center ran the first complete series in 2008, with Kenny Leon as artistic director. The Kennedy Center version featured 41 actors to cover the 77 different roles, including Lou Gossett Jr., Anthony Mackie, Tracie Thoms, Russell Hornsby, and LaTanya Richardson Jackson. Some theaters produced the cycle over multiple years, including the Goodman Theatre, the Huntington Theatre, the Pittsburgh Public Theater, the St. Louis Black Repertory Company (which completed a second cycle in 2025), and the Seatlle Repertory Theatre. In 2018, the Wilson estate and the Pittsburgh Post-Gazette recognized the 15 different professional, non-profit, and community theater organizations that had, at that point, staged the cycle. They also announced that they would grant future cycle-completers an official plaque to mark the accomplishment.

== Legacy ==
The Pittsburgh Cycle plays received critical acclaim and accolades at the time of their release. All nine of the plays that were eligible (Note: Jitney made its Broadway debut in 2017, but the Tony Awards categorized it as a revival, due to a prior off-Broadway production in 1999.) were nominated for the Tony Award for Best Play, with Fences the sole winner. Eight of the ten—excepting King Hedley II and Gem of the Ocean—won Best Play (or Best American Play) from the New York Drama Critics' Circle.

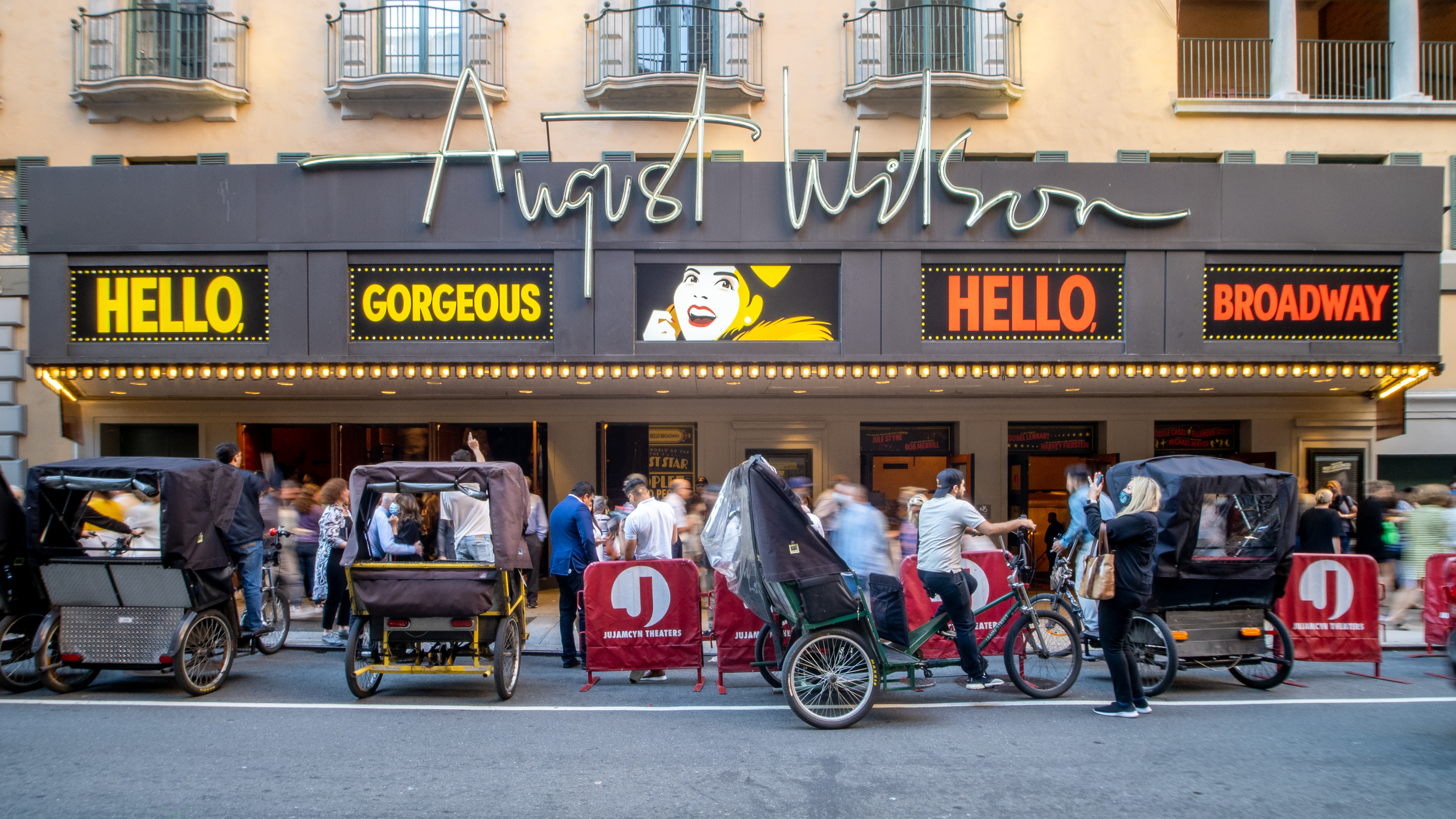
August Wilson Theatre on Broadway, which was renamed in 2005 for the playwright.

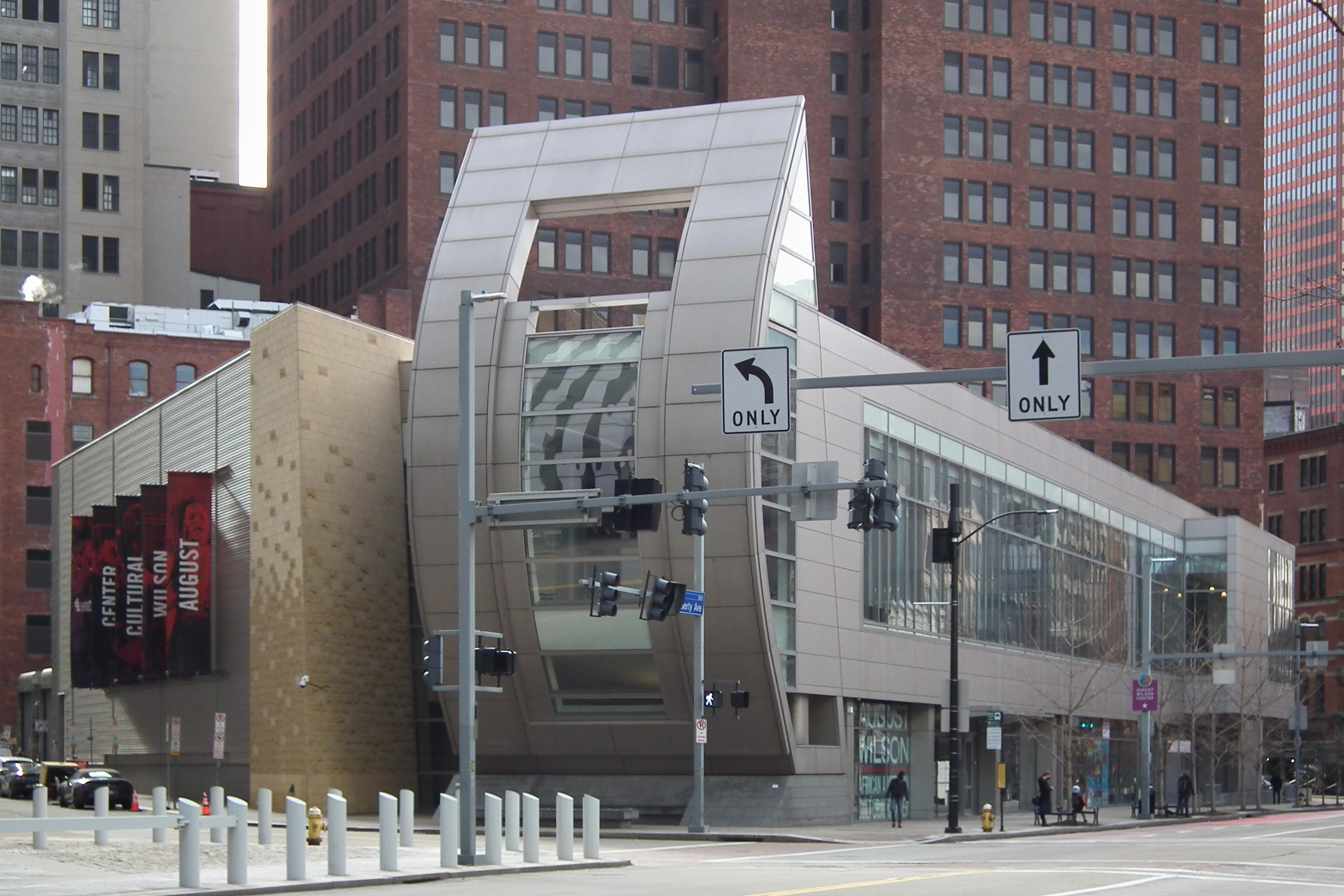
August Wilson African American Cultural Center in Pittsburgh, pictured in 2023

Wilson himself is regarded as one of the great American playwrights, often receiving comparison to other totemic playwrights like Eugene O'Neill, Tennessee Williams, and Arthur Miller. His completion of a long play cycle—which O'Neill tried and failed to do himself—features prominently among his achievements. The National August Wilson Wilson Monologue Competition—started in 2007 by Wilson collaborators Kenny Leon and Todd Kriedler—draws largely from the monologues of the cycle. The documentary Giving Voice followed the 2018 competition. In 2022, the August Wilson African American Cultural Center opened an exhibition featuring some of Wilson's possessions and sets constructed based on different cycle plays.

In 2005, shortly before his death, Jujamcyn Theaters said it would rename the Virginia Theatre after Wilson, where cycle play King Hedley II premiered on Broadway. It was the first Broadway theater to be named after an African American. At the dedication, which came after his passing, actors performed vignettes from Ma Rainey and Seven Guitars.

The cycle has returned to Broadway multiple times since Wilson's passing. One production—a revival of Joe Turner in 2009—received extensive criticism from Wilson mainstays for its white director, Bartlett Sher. Wilson had been firmly opposed to a white director for his film version of Fences during his lifetime and black directors—like Marion McClinton and Kenny Leon—noted how few opportunities there were for black directors otherwise. Joe Turner cast-member LaTanya Richardson Jackson—who herself later directed the 2022 revival of The Piano Lesson—said she understood the frustration, but praised Sher's directing ability.

Major awards for Pittsburgh Cycle plays on Broadway
Year	Title	Tony Awards		Drama Desk Awards	
Year	Title	Nominations	Wins	Nominations	Wins
1984	Ma Rainey's Black Bottom	3	0	2	1
1987	Fences	6	4	7	5
1988	Joe Turner's Come and Gone	6	1	7	0
1990	The Piano Lesson	5	0	5	1
1992	Two Trains Running	4	1	1	1
1996	Seven Guitars	8	1	5	1
1999	King Hedley II	6	1	4	2
2003	Ma Rainey's Black Bottom (Revival)	1	0	0	0
2004	Gem of the Ocean	5	0	1	0
2007	Radio Golf	4	0	3	0
2009	Joe Turner's Come and Gone (First revival)	6	2	0	0
2010	Fences (Revival)	10	3	4	3
2017	Jitney (Revival)	6	1	6	3
2022	The Piano Lesson (Revival)	2	0	5	1
2026	Joe Turner's Come and Gone (Second revival)	5	0	2	2
Total		77	14	53	20

=== Critical consensus ===
Joe Turner is frequently referred to as the best play in the cycle. Frank Rich called the play Wilson's most haunting, after reviewing the original premiere as his "finest achievement." Wilson biographer Patti Hartigan lays out the consensus on the cycle, with Joe Turner at the top as "the undisputed masterpiece;" Fences, The Piano Lesson, and Gem of the Ocean as "classics;" and King Hedley II as "the weakest," with the other lesser plays having considerable strengths. Harold Bloom included both Fences and Joe Turner in his 1994 canon of Western literature.

Critics Wesley Morris, Ben Brantley, Maya Phillips, and others have favorably compared the cycle to the work of William Shakespeare. Sam Pollard, who directed a documentary on Wilson for PBS, felt the Shakespeare label fit due to the historical scope of the cycle. Reviewing the 2026 revival of Joe Turner, chief theater critic for The New York Times Helen Shaw wrote of what she saw as the cycle's unique status:

Wilson’s Century Cycle can’t really be compared to any other playwright’s oeuvre: His nearly lifelong project was 10 plays [. . .]. Most of them are masterpieces. To compare him to another artist, you’d need to reach for Michelangelo or Proust or the cathedral builders, makers who composed on the scale of generations.

=== Impact on theater community ===
Multiple black actors—including Charles Dutton, Rocky Carroll, S. Epatha Merkerson, Viola Davis, Delroy Lindo, Laurence Fishburne, Angela Bassett, Courtney B. Vance—had their first major roles in the plays of the cycle. Dutton, Bassett, and Vance came to the roles shortly after their time at Yale Drama School under Lloyd Richards, who also invited them to the O'Neill workshops. Other actors, known as "Wilson Warriors," featured repeatedly in the later plays and subsequent revivals—including as directors—creating a small community with each other. Among those identified as Wilson Warriors are Ruben Santiago-Hudson, Anthony Chisholm, Stephen McKinley Henderson, and Phylicia Rashad, among others.

Davis reflected on his "revolutionary" impact in making black characters into "kings and queens." Successive black playwrights, including Suzan-Lori Parks, Tarell Alvin McCraney, Katori Hall, and Branden Jacobs-Jenkins, have each cited the substantial—and sometimes detrimental—impact Wilson's cycle has had on their own work. Dominique Morriseau credited the Pittsburgh Cycle with inspiration for her own three-play "Detroit Project," which she completed in 2022 with Skeleton Crew.
