= Seven Guitars =

1995 play written by August Wilson

- Original language: English
- Written by: August Wilson
- Characters: Louise; Canewell; Red Carter; Vera; Hedley; Floyd Barton; Ruby
- Series: The Pittsburgh Cycle
- Subject: blues music, masculinity, post World War II integration, violence, sexual politics, The Great Migration
- Genre: Tragicomedy
- Setting: 1948; The backyard of a boardinghouse in Pittsburgh, Pennsylvania

Premiere
- Date: 1995
- Place: Goodman Theatre; Chicago, Illinois
- Directed by: Walter Dallas; Lloyd Richards

Seven Guitars is a 1995 play by American playwright August Wilson. It focuses on seven African-American characters in the year 1948. The play begins and ends after the funeral of one of the main characters, showing events leading to the funeral in flashbacks. Seven Guitars represents the 1940s entry in Wilson's Pittsburgh Cycle, a decade-by-decade anthology of African-American life in Pittsburgh, Pennsylvania during the twentieth century; Wilson would revisit the stories of some of these characters in King Hedley II, set in the 1980s.

The play was Wilson's sixth and final collaboration with director Lloyd Richards. Their relationship suffered a breakdown during the play's development over the casting of Zakes Mokae and a new producing arrangement that gave Wilson additional veto power.

== Plot ==
=== Act one ===
The play begins with the characters mourning the death of their friend, blues singer Floyd "Schoolboy" Barton in the backyard of Vera's split-level apartment, where she, Louise, and Hedley live. (Note: This plot synopsis is based on the Samuel French edition published in 1996.) After the first scene, the play proceeds with the events of the previous week.

Just released from 90 days in a workhouse (on a trumped-up charge of vagrancy), Floyd returns to his former lover Vera's apartment. Vera distrusts Floyd after his relationship with another woman during a recording session in Chicago. That recording session—with guitarist Canewell and drummer Red Carter—resulted in Floyd's first hit song, "That's All Right", which plays throughout the play. Vera rejects Floyd's invitation to come to Chicago with him as he records a follow-up song. Louise receives a letter from her niece Ruby, who writes that she's moving north from Alabama after relationship issues.

Hedley, who raises and slaughters fowl in the backyard, has an advanced tuberculosis infection. He reproaches Louise for recommending he go to the local, newly integrated, sanitarium, believing that he'll be a "big man" when an angelic Buddy Bolden grants him a promised family fortune. Canewell—resenting Floyd for his budding stardom and fearing Chicago's over-zealous police—rebuffs Floyd's invitation to record more music in Chicago.

The next day, Louise talks with Vera, and supports her suspicions of Floyd, recounting her own relationship with a flighty man. Red Carter arrives with cigars to celebrate the birth of his son with Canewell and Floyd. They sing and discuss women, going to Chicago, and guns, with Hedley intermittently joining the conversation, including to argue—against Red Carter and Floyd's notion of self-advancement in the absence of an active God—that the Bible foretells a black vengeance against oppressive whites a la the Lion of Judah. Later, the characters gather to listen to a Joe Louis fight on the radio.

As the characters are chatting and playing whist following the fight, Ruby unexpectedly arrives, drawing both Canewell and Red Carter's flirtation. They discuss the neighbor's rooster, noting how out of place and annoying its crowing is in the city environment. Despite saying that the rooster is the king of the barnyard, like the black man, Hedley suddenly retrieves the rooster and slits its throat with his tools. The first act ends with his monologue about how the group's complaining about the rooster and its antiquated role meant that they no longer deserved it, drawing comparisons to black men in toto.

=== Act two ===
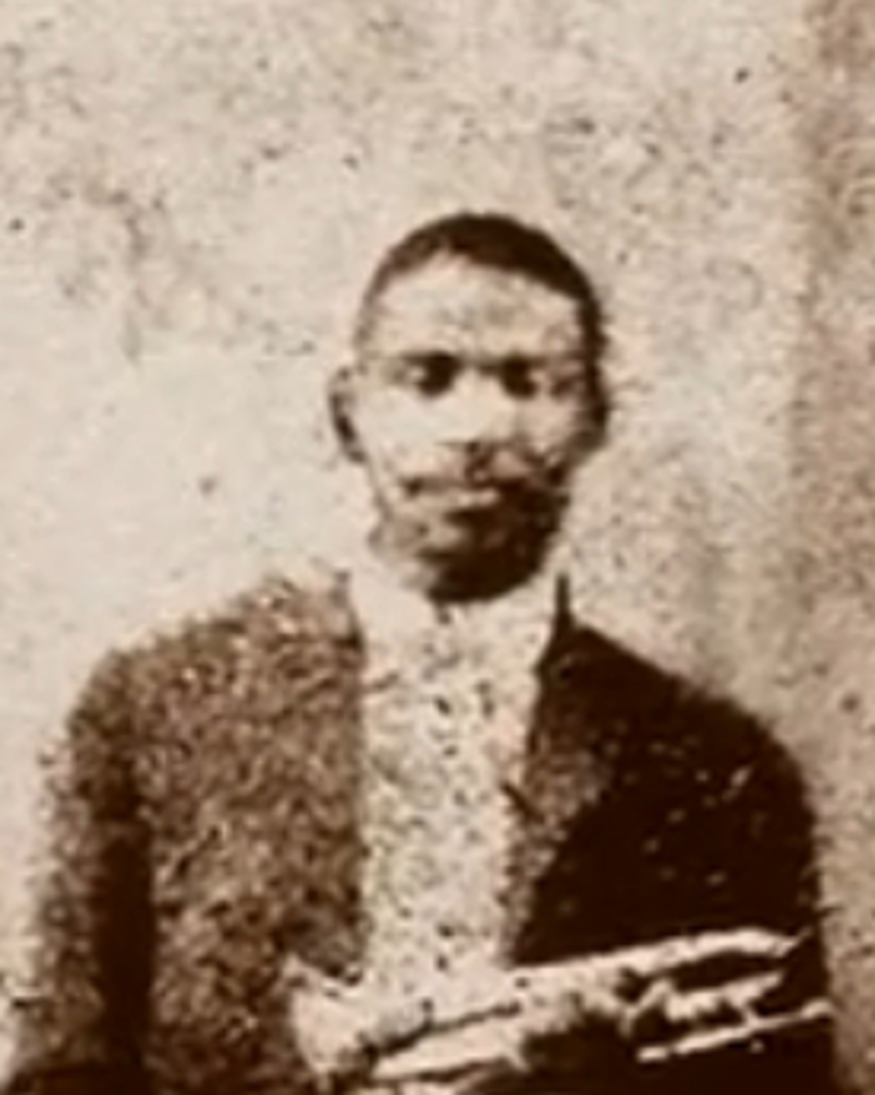
Blues and jazz pioneer Buddy Bolden, who is referenced repeatedly in the play, pictured in 1905.

Ruby and Hedley talk, with Hedley recounting how he killed a man for not calling him "King", a name—based on Buddy Bolden—that his father called him. He propositions Ruby to give him a child, but she declines due to the age gap. Floyd faces down bureaucratic intransigence from the workhouse—which owes him $0.30 pay for each day there, but which requires a specific form—and the pawnshop—where he sold his good guitar. Though his song became a hit, Floyd didn't negotiate a contract that would reward him for its success, so he lacks enough money for the guitar, the bus fare to Chicago, and a gravestone for his mother.

Ruby reveals that she came north after her ex-partner Elmore—who she left for his possessive behavior—killed her new partner Leroy in cold blood. She is also pregnant, but doesn't know by which man. Floyd negotiates an advance with his white manager, T.L. Hall, who promises to meet with him the next morning to help him buy back his guitar. When he fails to appear, Floyd learns from Red Carter that Hall has abandoned the city after being found out for a long-term insurance fraud scheme. In despair, Floyd leaves the yard, declaring that he will make it to Chicago. The next day, no one knows where he went, despite Vera, Canewell, and Red Carter's attempts to find him.

Hedley delivers a long monologue about his father, recounting how he once beat Hedley when he asked why his father wasn't a "big man" who fought the system like Toussaint Louverture. After Hedley apologized to his father on his deathbed, he learned that he had already passed. Later, his father came to him in a dream to apologize for dying before forgiving him and promise that Buddy Bolden would bestow Hedley a fortune. Still fearing the sanitarium and that white men would involuntarily commit him to it, Hedley goes to his boss, who gifts him a machete. Later, Hedley is riven with paroxysms of paranoia and despair over the treatment of black men until Ruby, hearing the noise, comes and soothes him, before succumbing to his sexual advances.

Floyd returns after two days, showing Vera a new guitar and telling of his planned performance for Mother's Day at the local club. He also shows her how he bought them both bus tickets to Chicago, expressing his need for her and asking that she accompany him. Vera reveals that she herself had gone to the station earlier to buy her own one-way ticket from Chicago to Pittsburgh, as an expression of her conditional re-commitment to Floyd.

As the women ready for the band's Mother's Day performance, Ruby confides to the others that she plans to have Hedley father her child, as the only man who wanted to provide for, rather than possess, her. She had also accompanied him to church and convinced him to go to the sanitarium the next week. Canewell enters, and reads aloud a newspaper story about the neighbor's son Poochie, who was arrested for robbing the local convenience store. When left alone, Vera tells Canewell of her reconciliation with Floyd, to which he responds with a bittersweet monologue about his own unrequited love for her.

The band's performance is a major success, with the club crowded with patrons. Afterward, Canewell notices an uprooted goldenseal plant in the garden and finds $1,200 buried underneath. Floyd demands it from him and they fight over it briefly, before Floyd pulls his gun. Canewell realizes that this was his score from Poochie's convenience store robbery and relents. A drunk Hedley discovers Floyd with the money and thinks that he's Buddy Bolden. Floyd pushes Hedley to the ground after he tries to take the money. Hedley leaves and returns to slash Floyd's throat with his machete.

The last scene of the play continues the first, with the characters after Floyd's burial. The police had questioned Canewell and Louise on his murder, but didn't know who committed the crime. The play ends with Hedley repeatedly singing Jelly Roll Morton's "I Heard Buddy Bolden Say".

== Development ==
In 1984—after completing Ma Rainey's Black Bottom and while developing Fences and Joe Turner's Come and Gone—Wilson articulated his plan for a 10-play cycle that would follow black Americans throughout the decades of the twentieth century. In his early efforts in 1990, Wilson's originally conceived the 1940s installment as a play called Moon Going Down, set in an all-male turpentine camp in Georgia during World War II. He shifted the story after imagining the characters all together when a woman—the character of Vera—walked into the scene and asks for her own. The character of Canewell, with the rooster motif, came to him shortly after. Though he considered moving the play in Chicago—as a natural place for blues musicians in the time period—he returned it to Pittsburgh, basing the backyard on his own childhood backyard.

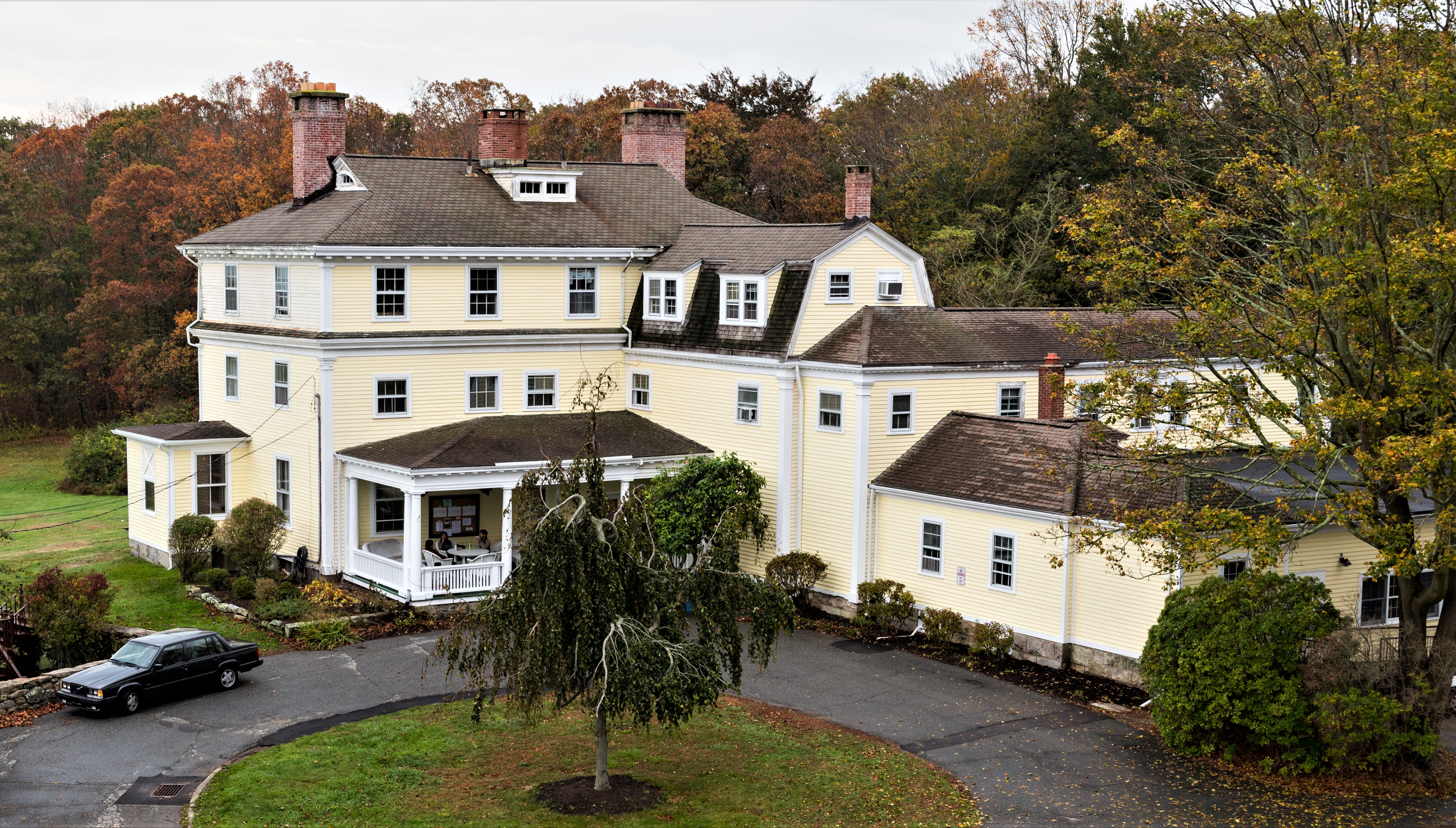
The Hammond Mansion at the Eugene O'Neill Theater Center, pictured in 2017

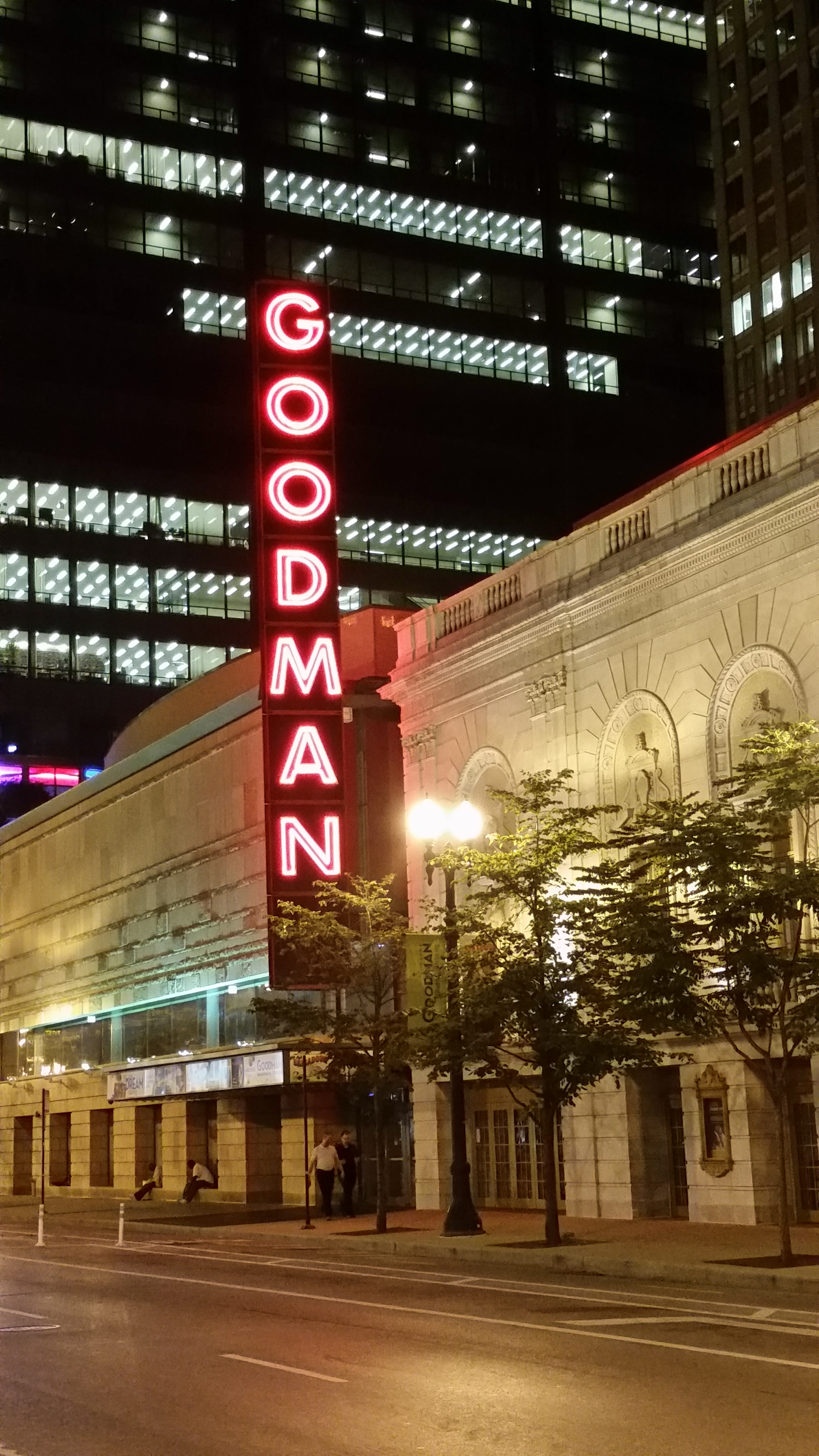
The Goodman Theatre in Chicago, pictured in 2014

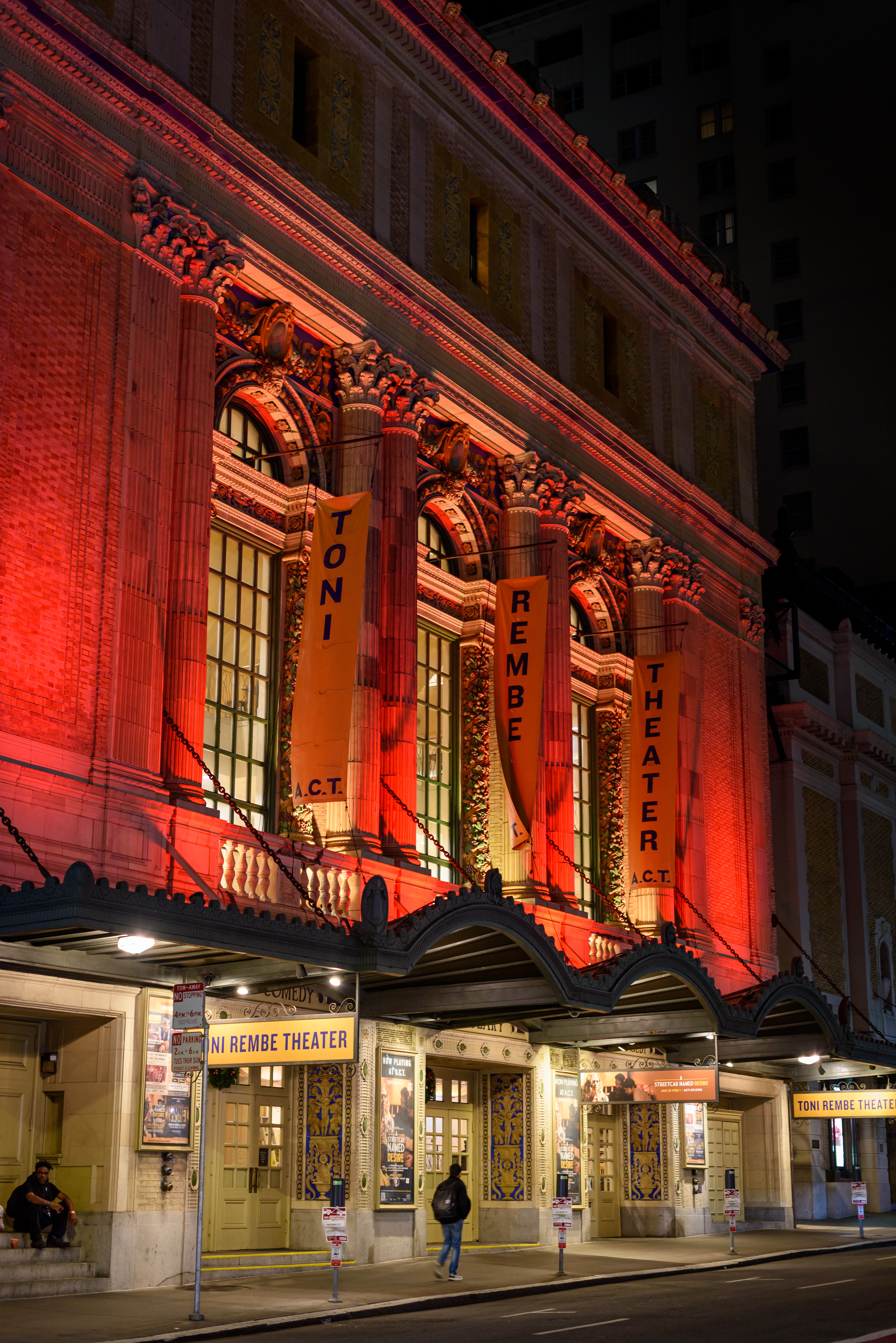
The American Conservatory Theater in San Francisco, pictured in 2025

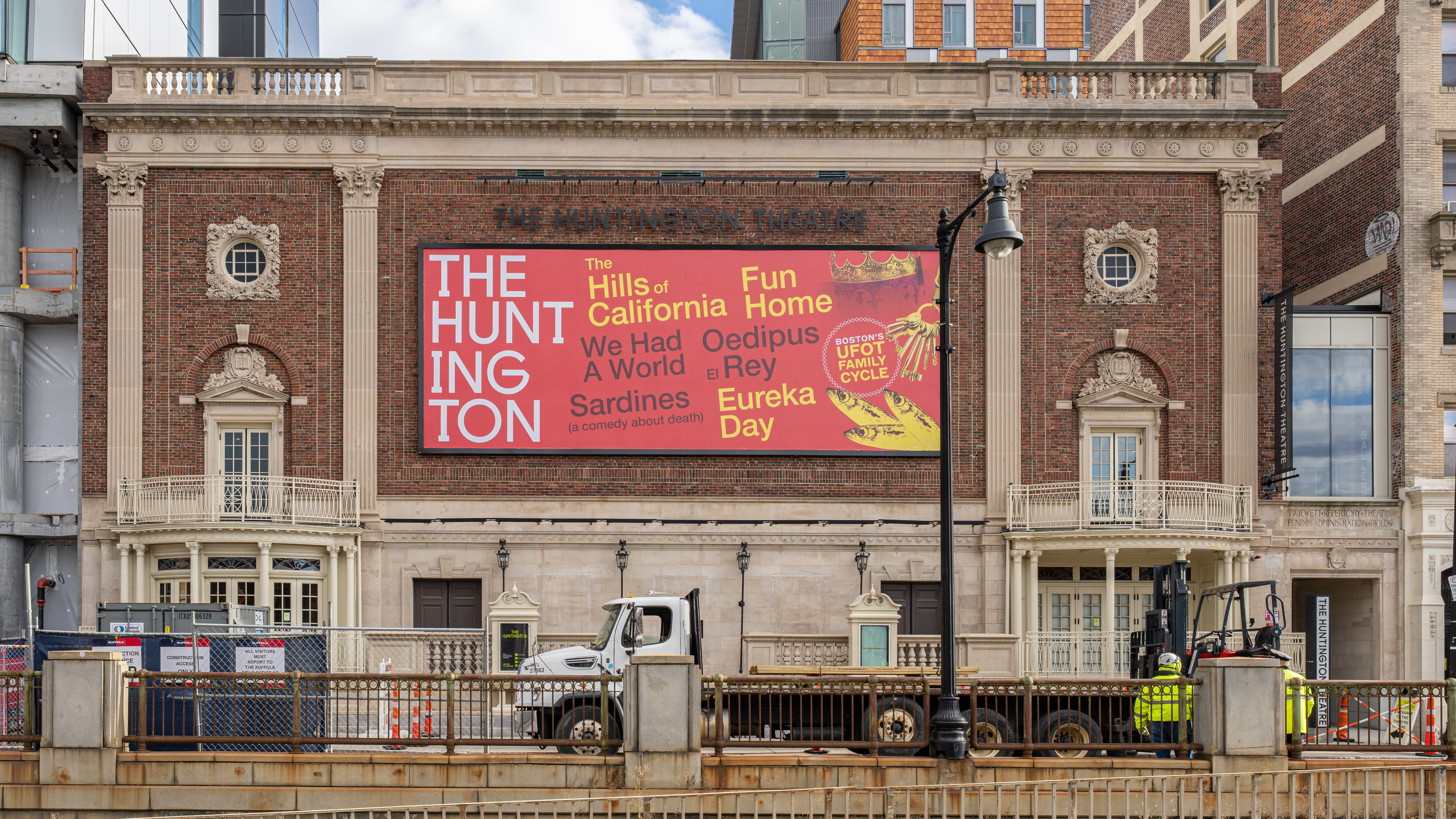
The Huntington Theatre in Boston, Massachusetts, pictured in 2025

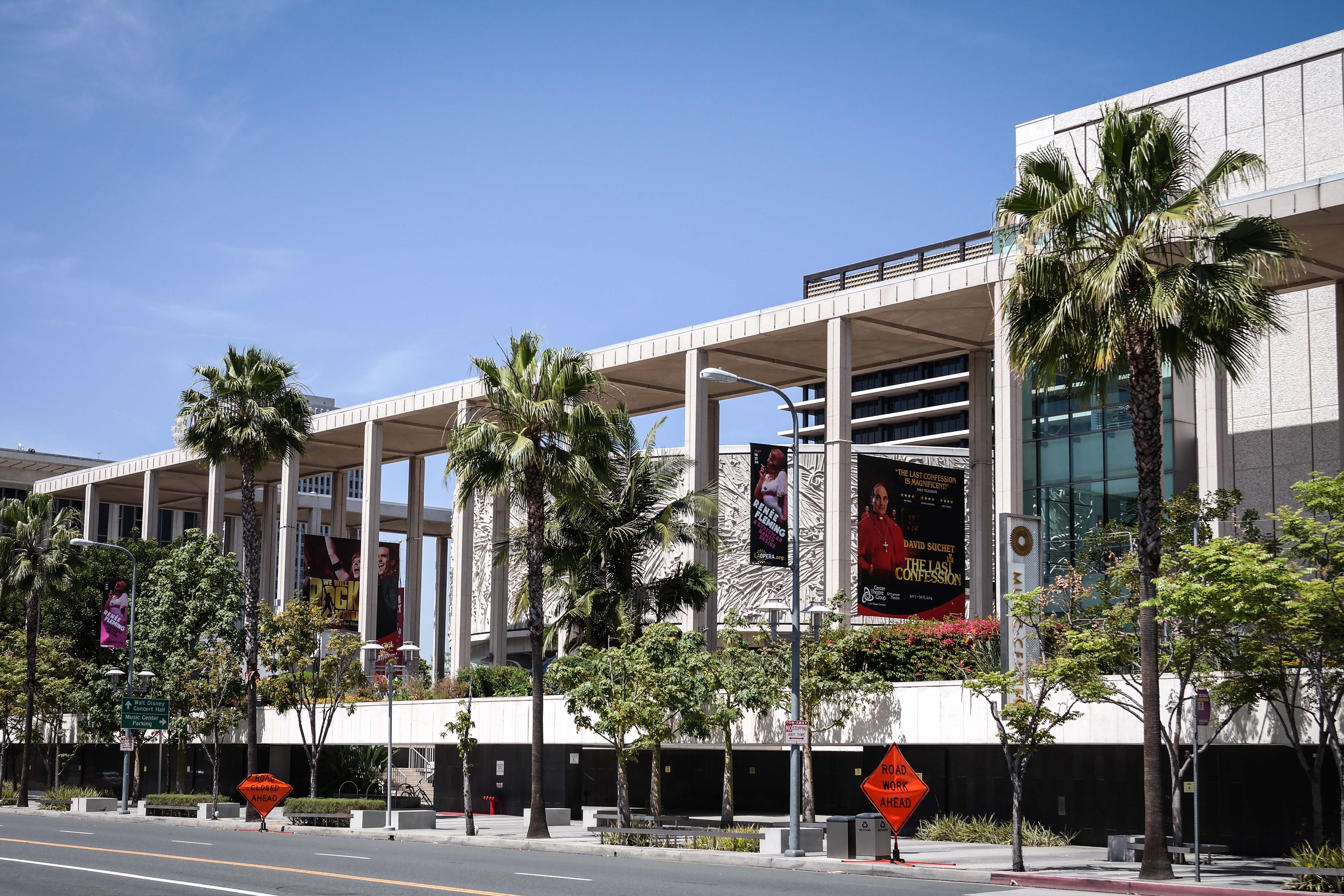
The Ahmanson Theatre in Los Angeles, pictured in 2014

Wilson submitted the play to the Eugene O'Neill Theater Center, where he had workshopped most of his previous plays, for the summer of 1994. Seven Guitars was the sixth play that Wilson developed with Lloyd Richards, who oversaw the O'Neill workshops, brought them to the Yale Repertory Theatre, and then went on to direct the professional productions. Richards also developed a process of bringing each of Wilson's plays to different non-profit theaters in the League of Resident Theatres consortium, allowing Wilson to cut and revise the plays for their eventual Broadway transfer.

Amy Saltz directed the O'Neill staged reading, which she described as "a lot of speeches," rather than a cohesive play. It was during this stage that Wilson wrote Vera's lovelorn monologue in scene 2, at Saltz's urging that he further develop her character. The O'Neill cast included Tommy Hollis and Charles Dutton. The original O'Neill version of the play ran at more than 4 hours, before it was cut down to around 3 hours for its March 1996 opening.

With Richards retired from Yale Rep, Seven Guitars was set to premiere under his direction at Chicago's Goodman Theatre in January 1995. In that context, Wilson, Richards and producer Benjamin Mordecai—who, as Yale Rep managing director from 1982 on, had worked with the pair on each of the prior plays—worked to negotiate a new producing arrangement. In the agreement, Wilson would receive 50 percent of the profit, Richards 35 percent, and Mordecai 15 percent. The plan originally granted each person a vote and required unanimity to clear any deadlocks, but Wilson argued for a higher stake (52 percent) and for Wilson's right as tiebreaker. Richards complained that it would "create a center of power in one person and erode the original concept of partnership," leading Wilson and Mordecai to proceed with the company—called Sageworks—without him.

The relationship also became more complex when Richards underwent complicated surgery in December 1994, requiring him to pull out from the Goodman production. The Goodman opening was instead directed by Walter Dallas of the New Freedom Theatre, as Richards recuperated, making it Wilson's first professionally produced world premiere not directed at Yale Rep or by Richards. Various Wilson veterans, including lighting designer Christopher Akerlind and music supervisor Dwight Andrews, expressed frustration to Wilson biographer Patti Hartigan about their perceived decrease in quality under Dallas and Wilson's increased imperiousness. Wilson also struggled to continue editing his draft, working little with Mordecai or Dallas. The Goodman production received mixed reviews. Variety's Lewis Lazare led his review with the conclusion that "one of America's most gifted playwrights needs a good editor," though he also noted that Dallas's "production flows smoothly and nicely captures the real strengths of Wilson's writing."

Richards rejoined the production as director for its next staging, at the Huntington Theatre in September. Due to no longer being with Yale Rep and his frustration by the Sageworks arrangement, Richards negotiated for his standard director's fee, which was substantially higher than the discounted rate he had previously used with Wilson. For the Huntington, Richards brought in Keith David to replace Jerome Preston Bates as Floyd and Zakes Mokae (after Charles Dutton and Delroy Lindo each declined) to replace Albert Hall as Hedley.

During the Huntington production, Mokae had difficulty with the role. Although Wilson said he imagined Mokae when he wrote the role, Mokae couldn't memorize the long speeches or properly grasp the character's Jamaican accent. The cast and crew noted his difficulty, with Wilson bringing it to Richards shortly before the Huntington production closed. Richards felt loyalty to Mokae and wanted to give him more opportunity to improve as the play continued to San Francisco's American Conservatory Theater in November 1995. Wilson reacted poorly to the negative reviews, feeling that Mokae's struggles hurt the play holistically.

After the San Francisco production opening, Wilson—empowered as both writer and producer—demanded that Richards replace Mokae. Despite Richards's even keel, the discussion became a screaming match audible outside the theater. Hartigan quoted former YSD student Julie Boyd, who had attended the show, as saying "it was probably one of three times [Richards] showed that kind of anger in fifty years." Roger Robinson replaced Mokae for the rest of the run, later continuing onto Broadway.

From the point of their dispute over Mokae, Hartigan notes that Richards and Wilson barely spoke for the rest of the run, including the January 1996 staging at the Ahmanson Theatre. Though they continued to work together and promote the play together, they collaborated dysfunctionally behind the scenes. Ruben Santiago-Hudson, who played Canewell, compared their relationship to that of divorced parents. Mokae's replacement Roger Robinson also caused conflict with other castmembers, refusing to respect Richards's authority as director.

The play was the final collaboration between Wilson and Richards. For his next project, Jitney, Wilson turned to Marion McClinton and Walter Dallas. The two men didn't speak until Wilson called Richards a month before Wilson's death. Richards later commented that he expected they would have more time to further reconcile, but that ultimately "whatever we had, that was it. We completed our relationship at this place, and in this time."

As late as March 1996, shortly before the Broadway premiere, Wilson continued to cut from the play. Over the year-long development through LORT theaters, Wilson cut 90 minutes from the play. He also shifted speeches away from Canewell and Louise, in favor of Floyd, Hedley, and Vera. Santiago-Hudson expressed severe dismay after one series of cuts, which removed one of Canewell's major monologues after the Boston production. He declined to talked to Wilson for three days and described the turbulent revision process as "too hard, too painful."

== Productions ==
=== Original Broadway production ===
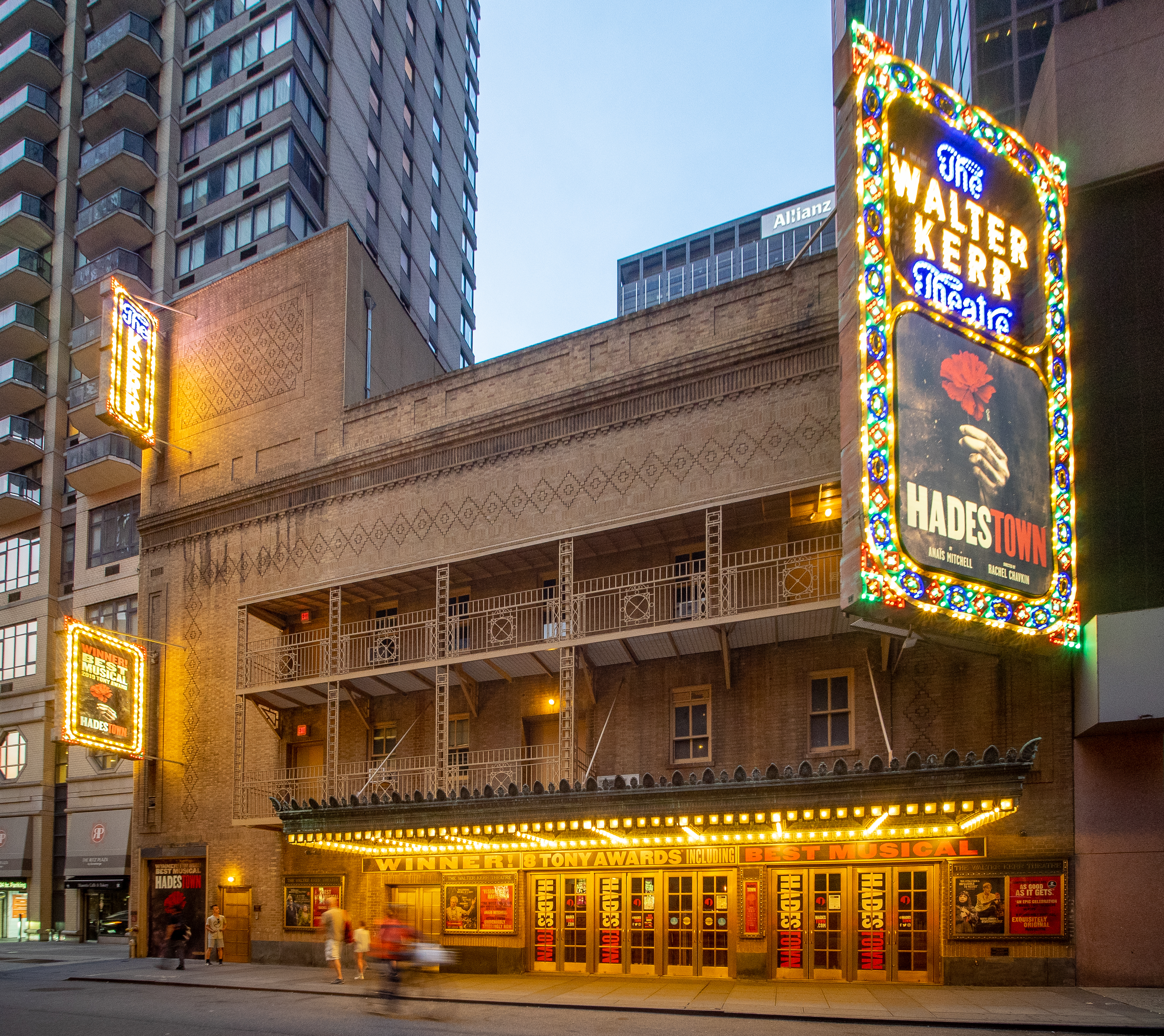
The Walter Kerr Theatre on Broadway, pictured in 2019

Following its development process in Chicago, Boston, San Francisco, and Los Angeles, Seven Guitars opened at the Walter Kerr Theatre on Broadway on March 28, 1996. The production was directed by Lloyd Richards and featured Keith David (Floyd), Roger Robinson (Hedley), Viola Davis (Vera), Ruben Santiago-Hudson (Canewell), Michele Shay (Louise), Tommy Hollis (Red Carter), and Rosalyn Colemna (Ruby).

The production received largely positive, but qualified, reviews from critics. The New York Times theater critic Vincent Canby praised it as a "big, invigorating if unruly new tragicomedy," that was "still rough around the edges, [but] as funny as it is moving and lyrical." Margo Jefferson argued that Wilson's cycle project had reached the point where "theatergoers should see Seven Guitars, for example, without having to think, 'Can I afford $65 for a play that Vincent and Margo and various other people point out will be disappointing in the second half?'" Linda Winer of Newsday likewise contextualized her review within the broader cycle, writing "in his great cycle of the African-American 20th Century, his men and women have established a tone, a style, a credibility so genuine and alive that their world seems to continue whether we are there or not. We have come to be grateful for the privilege of sharing, even luxuriating, in the special music of their conversations." New York Post critic Clive Barnes wrote that the play was "like a session number with great riffs but a less than interesting melody."

The play received 8 Tony Award nominations, the most of any straight-play that season. Seven Guitars lost the award for Best Play to Terrence McNally's Master Class and won only one award, for Santiago-Hudson's performance as Canewell. The play also received five nominations for the 1996 Drama Desk Awards, winning only for Scott Bradley's set design.

=== Notable casts ===
Characters	Goodman Theatre (premiere)	Walter Kerr Theatre (Broadway)	Signature Theatre (off-Broadway)	Lincoln Center Theater (off-Broadway)
Characters	1995	1996	2006	2026
Floyd Barton	Jerome Preston Bates	Keith David	Lance Reddick	Russell Hornsby
Louise	Michele Shay	Michele Shay	Brenda Pressley	Roslyn Ruff
Canewell	Ruben Santiago-Hudson	Ruben Santiago-Hudson	Kevin T. Carroll	Jason Dirden
Vera	Viola Davis	Viola Davis	Roslyn Ruff	Kristolyn Lloyd
Hedley	Albert Hall	Roger Robinson	Charles Weldon	John Douglas Thompson
Red Carter	Tommy Hollis	Tommy Hollis	Stephen McKinley Henderson	Michael Potts
Ruby	Rosalyn Coleman	Rosalyn Coleman	Cassandra Freeman	Chanté Adams

== Awards and nominations ==
Year	Award	Category	Nominee(s)	Result	Ref
1995	Pulitzer Prize	Drama	August Wilson	Finalist	
1996	The Tony Awards	Best Play	Seven Guitars	Nominated	
1996	The Tony Awards	Best Featured Actor in a Play	Roger Robinson	Nominated	
1996	The Tony Awards	Best Featured Actor in a Play	Ruben Santiago-Hudson	Won	
1996	The Tony Awards	Best Featured Actress in a Play	Viola Davis	Nominated	
1996	The Tony Awards	Best Featured Actress in a Play	Michele Shay	Nominated	
1996	The Tony Awards	Best Direction of a Play	Lloyd Richards	Nominated	
1996	The Tony Awards	Best Scenic Design in a Play	Scott Bradley	Nominated	
1996	The Tony Awards	Best Lighting Design in a Play	Christopher Akerlind	Nominated	
1996	Drama Desk Awards	Outstanding Play	Seven Guitars	Nominated	
1996	Drama Desk Awards	Outstanding Featured Actor in a Play	Ruben Santiago-Hudson	Nominated	
1996	Drama Desk Awards	Outstanding Featured Actress in a Play	Viola Davis	Nominated	
1996	Drama Desk Awards	Outstanding Director of a Play	Lloyd Richards	Nominated	
1996	Drama Desk Awards	Outstanding Scenic Design for a Play	Scott Bradley	Won	
1996	New York Drama Critics Circle	Best Play	Seven Guitars	Won	
2007	Obie Award	Performance	Roslyn Ruff	Won	
