= Jitney (play) =

1982 play by American playwright August Wilson

- Original language: English
- Written by: August Wilson
- Series: The Pittsburgh Cycle
- Genre: Drama
- Setting: 1977, a worn-down gypsy cab station in Pittsburgh's Hill District

Premiere
- Date: 1982
- Place: Allegheny Repertory Theatre; Pittsburgh, Pennsylvania

Jitney is a play by American playwright August Wilson. The eighth in his "Pittsburgh Cycle", this play is set in a worn-down illegal taxi operation station in Pittsburgh, Pennsylvania, in early autumn 1977. The play premiered in a Broadway theatre in 2017.

== Productions ==
Jitney was written in 1979 and first produced in 1982 at the small Allegheny Repertory Theatre, Pittsburgh, Pennsylvania. When Wilson took his mother to see that production they arrived by jitney. That was followed by a separate production at Penumbra Theatre in St. Paul, Minnesota. After Wilson had a series of plays produced on Broadway, Eddie Gilbert, artistic director of the Pittsburgh Public Theater, read the 1979 script and asked to produce it.

In response, Wilson returned to Pittsburgh in 1996 re-writing it extensively for what is referred to as its professional premiere, which was directed by Marion McClinton. This was the first Pittsburgh Cycle premiere not to be directed by Lloyd Richards. Over the next four years there were up to 20 productions nationwide, many with the same core cast as in Pittsburgh, including the 1997 production at the Crossroads Theatre in New Jersey, which was directed by Walter Dallas, and the 1998 production at Boston's Huntington Theatre Company, directed by McClinton.

Wilson continued working on the script. Jitney opened Off-Broadway at the Second Stage Theatre on April 25, 2000, and closed on September 10, because another play was coming in. The play next moved to the Union Square Theatre on September 19, 2000, where it closed on January 28, 2001. Jitney ran successfully Off-Broadway, and was the only one of the 10 Pittsburgh Cycle plays not to appear promptly on Broadway, possibly because Wilson's previous play had lost money, making investors cautious. Directed by Marion McClinton, the cast featured four actors who had been with it almost continuously since 1996: Anthony Chisholm (Fielding), Paul Butler (Becker), Willis Burks (Shealy) and Stephen McKinley Henderson (Turnbo).

Jitney went on to London, and ran at the National Theatre's Lyttelton Theatre from October 16, 2001, through November 21, 2001. It won the Olivier Award for best play of the year. Directed by McClinton, it featured much of the New York cast.

McClinton's production moved to San Francisco's Curran Theatre in early 2002.

The play has been performed often in regional theater, including at the Studio Theatre in Washington, D.C., in 2001, the Denver Center for the Performing Arts in 2002, Ford's Theatre, Washington, D.C., in 2007, and the Kennedy Center, Washington, D.C., in 2008.

The Broadway premiere of Jitney began previews at the Samuel J. Friedman Theatre on December 28, 2016, and opened on January 19, 2017. The play closed on March 12, 2017. The play, produced by the Manhattan Theatre Club, was directed by Ruben Santiago-Hudson, with a cast featuring John Douglas Thompson (Becker), Brandon J. Dirden (Booster), André Holland (Youngblood), Carra Patterson (Rena), Michael Potts (Turnbo), Anthony Chisholm (Fielding), Keith Randolph Smith (Doub), Harvy Blanks (Shealy) and Ray Anthony Thomas (Philmore).

== Characters ==
- Jim Becker, the well-respected manager of the jitney station. In his 60s.
- Doub, a driver, cautious and slow going, a Korean War veteran
- Fielding, a driver, an alcoholic, formerly a tailor who clothed Billy Eckstine and Count Basie.
- Turnbo, a driver, notorious for being a gossip
- Youngblood (Darnell Williams), a driver. Recently returned from Vietnam, working several jobs to provide for his family. In his late 20s.
- Rena, Youngblood's girlfriend and the mother of his young son, Jesse.
- Shealy, a flamboyant bookie who uses the jitney station as the basis of his operations.
- Philmore, a local hotel doorman and a frequent jitney passenger.
- Booster (Clarence Becker), Becker's son, who has just completed a 20-year prison sentence for murder. In his late 30s.

== Synopsis ==
Regular taxi cabs will not travel to the Pittsburgh Hill District of the 1970s, and so the residents turn to jitneys—unofficial, unlicensed taxi cabs—that operate in the community. This play portrays the lives of the jitney drivers at the station owned by Jim Becker.

We are rapidly introduced to the drivers at the station: solid, easy-going Korean War veteran Doub, gossipy hothead Turnbo, alcoholic Fielding, and Darnell (called Youngblood by the other drivers), an army veteran recently returned from Vietnam who is attempting to build a new life for his family. Flamboyant numbers runner Shealy is not a driver, but uses the station's phone as his base of operations. Conflict arises when Turnbo insinuates himself into Youngblood's love life, telling Youngblood's girlfriend Rena that he has been seen around town with her sister when he should have been at home with their young son. Despite his protestations of innocence, she accuses Youngblood, who has been acting secretively and has taken money needed for groceries to pay a vague "debt", of cheating on her, which he has done in the past. Youngblood attacks Turnbo for causing trouble and Turnbo pulls a gun on him, threatening to shoot him, but station boss Becker intervenes and defuses the situation.

Becker's son, Clarence (nicknamed Booster) is released early from prison after serving 20 years for the murder of his college girlfriend, a white woman who had falsely accused him of rape. Becker has not visited him in prison once during that span, furious that he made sacrifices to provide for Booster's future only for him to throw it away on needless revenge. Booster comes to the station anxious to reconcile with his father, but Becker refuses to listen to him, furiously blaming him for his mother's death; she died of grief after Booster was sentenced to death. Angry recriminations are thrown on either side and Becker disowns his son. When Booster returns later to apologize, Becker pointedly ignores him.

News arrives that the building housing the station is to be condemned and torn down by the city. The drivers contemplate renting new space elsewhere, or disbanding the jitney company, but later that evening Becker encourages them to resolve to fight the eviction. Youngblood admits to Rena that his secretive behavior has been because he has been saving up to buy a house as a surprise for her; her sister was helping him look at houses. Rena admonishes him for buying a house without consulting her, but acknowledges his intentions, and they reconcile.

Tragedy strikes unexpectedly when Becker, who has taken a second job at the steel mill where he used to work before retiring, is killed in an industrial accident. Booster breaks down in agony on hearing his father is dead, but at the end of the play appears ready to take his place as the head of the jitney station.

== Awards and nominations ==
Awards

- 2001: Lucille Lortel Award, Outstanding Scenic Design, David Gallo
- 2000: Drama Desk Award
  - Outstanding Scenic Design of a Play, David Gallo
  - Special Award, Outstanding Ensemble Performance
- 1999–2000: OBIE Award
  - Performance, Ensemble
  - Direction, Marion McClinton
- 2000–2001: Outer Critics Circle Award, Outstanding Off-Broadway Play
- 2000: Drama Critics' Circle Award, Best Play, August Wilson
- 2000: Henry Hewes Design Award, Scenic Design, David Gallo
- 2002: Laurence Olivier Award for Best New Play

=== 2017 Broadway Revival ===
| Year | Ceremony | Award | Nominee | Result |
|---|---|---|---|---|
| 2017 | Tony Awards | Best Revival of a Play | | Won |
| 2017 | Tony Awards | Best Direction of a Play | Ruben Santiago-Hudson | Nominated |
| 2017 | Tony Awards | Best Featured Actor in a Play | John Douglas Thompson | Nominated |
| 2017 | Tony Awards | Best Scenic Design of a Play | David Gallo | Nominated |
| 2017 | Tony Awards | Best Costume Design of a Play | Toni-Leslie James | Nominated |
| 2017 | Tony Awards | Best Lighting Design of a Play | Jane Cox | Nominated |
| 2017 | Drama Desk Awards | Outstanding Revival of a Play | | Won |
| 2017 | Drama Desk Awards | Outstanding Director of a Play | Ruben Santiago-Hudson | Won |
| 2017 | Drama Desk Awards | Outstanding Actor in a Play | John Douglas Thompson | Nominated |
| 2017 | Drama Desk Awards | Outstanding Set Design of a Play | David Gallo | Nominated |
| 2017 | Drama Desk Awards | Outstanding Costume Design of a Play | Toni-Leslie James | Nominated |
| 2017 | Drama Desk Awards | Outstanding Music in a Play | Bill Sims Jr. | Won |
| 2017 | Drama League Awards | Distinguished Performance Award | John Douglas Thompson | Nominated |
| 2017 | Drama League Awards | Outstanding Revival of a Broadway or Off-Broadway Play | | Won |
| 2017 | New York Drama Critics' Circle Awards | Special Citation | Ruben Santiago-Hudson and the ensemble cast of Jitney | Honored |
| 2017 | Outer Critics Circle Awards | Outstanding Revival of a Play (Broadway or Off-Broadway) | | Won |
