= Radio Golf =

Play by August Wilson and final part of the "Pittsburgh Cycle"

- Written by: August Wilson
- Original language: English
- Series: The Pittsburgh Cycle
- Subject: a powerful African-American politician runs for the highest office of his career
- Genre: Drama
- Setting: the Hill District of Pittsburgh, 1997

Premiere
- Date premiered: 2005
- Place premiered: New Haven, Connecticut

Radio Golf is a play by American playwright, August Wilson, the final installment in his ten-part series, The Century Cycle, and his final work overall. It was first performed in 2005 by the Yale Repertory Theatre in New Haven, Connecticut and had its Broadway premiere in 2007 at the Cort Theatre.

== Plot ==
Harmond Wilks, an Ivy League-educated man who has inherited a real estate agency from his father, his ambitious wife Mame, and his friend Roosevelt Hicks want to redevelop the Hill District in Pittsburgh, Pennsylvania. The project, called the Bedford Hills Redevelopment Project, includes two high-rise apartment buildings and high-end chain stores like Starbucks, Whole Foods, and Barnes & Noble. Harmond is also about to declare his candidacy to be Pittsburgh's first black mayor. Roosevelt has just been named a vice-president of Mellon Bank and has been tapped by a Bernie Smith to help him acquire a local radio station at less than market value, which is possible through a minority tax incentive.

A complication arises when Harmond discovers that the house at 1839 Wylie, slated for demolition, was acquired illegally. Harmond offers the owner of the property market value for the house, but the owner refuses to sell. Harmond decides the only way to proceed is to build around the house, which will require minor modifications to the planned development, and calls the demolition company to cancel the demolition. Roosevelt sees no reason to delay since no one but Harmond, Roosevelt, Mame, and the house's owner know the truth, a view Mame supports. When, on the day of the demolition, which Roosevelt has put back into motion, Harmond refuses to be swayed from his stand, Roosevelt announces he will be buying Harmond out and Bernie Smith will be helping him. Harmond accuses Roosevelt of being Smith's "black face" and the two argue over the consequences of Harmond demanding changes in the development plans and if Roosevelt is allowing himself to be used by Bernie Smith. Harmond tells Roosevelt to leave the Bedford Hills Redevelopment office, which is owned by Wilks Realty. The scene ends with Harmond leaving the office to join the group of Hill residents at 1839 Wylie protesting the demolition.

== Productions ==
The world premiere of Radio Golf was at the Yale Repertory Theatre from April 22 to May 14, 2005; it was then presented on the West Coast by the Mark Taper Forum in Los Angeles, California, in August 2005. The Yale production was directed by Timothy Douglas. Kenny Leon directed the production at the Mark Taper Forum. This production also played at the Seattle Rep Theatre from January 19 - February 18 of 2006 before opening at the Huntington Theatre Company in Boston, Massachusetts in October 2006, and the McCarter Theatre in 2007. The play was performed at the Tricycle Theatre in London, UK between 2 October and 1 November 2008.

The play opened on Broadway at the Cort Theatre on May 8, 2007, and closed on July 1, 2007, after 64 performances and 17 previews. Directed by Kenny Leon, the cast featured Anthony Chisholm (Elder Joseph Barlow), John Earl Jelks (Sterling Johnson), Harry Lennix (Harmond Wilks), Tonya Pinkins (Mame Wilks), and James A. Williams (Roosevelt Hicks).

The Cort Theatre was also the venue where Wilson's first Broadway play, Ma Rainey's Black Bottom, opened in 1984. Chicago's Goodman Theatre is the first to mount a production of the complete ten play The Pittsburgh Cycle with the closing of Radio Golf in early 2007. The St. Louis Black Repertory Theatre's production of Radio Golf opened in Feb., 2008. The Studio Theatre in Washington, D.C., produced the play, opening May 20, 2009. The Denver Center Theatre Company also produced the play in April 2009, and was the first theatre company to stage all ten plays of "The Pittsburgh Cycle" under one director, Israel Hicks. Geva Theatre Center in Rochester, New York produced the play in March 2011 and is the first theatre to produce all ten plays in decade order as "August Wilson's American Century."

The Broadway producers were Jujamcyn Theaters, Margo Lion, Jeffrey Richards/Jerry Frankel, Tamara Tunie/Wendell Pierce, Fran Kirmser, Bunting Management Group, George Frontiere and Open Pictures, Lauren Doll/Steven Greil & The August Wilson Group, Wondercity Inc., Townsend Teague, Jack Viertel, Gordon Davidson.

== Awards and nominations ==
Awards

- 2007 New York Drama Critics' Circle Award for Best American Play

Nominations

- 2007 Tony Award for Best Play
- 2007 Tony Award for Best Featured Actor in a Play -- Anthony Chisholm
- 2007 Tony Award for Best Featured Actor in a Play -- John Earl Jelks
- 2007 Drama Desk Award for Outstanding Play
- 2007 Drama League Award for Distinguished Production of a Play
- 2007 Outer Critics Circle Award for Outstanding New Broadway Play
