= Michele Shay =

American actress

- Born: 1955 (age 70–71); Tuskegee, Alabama, United States
- Occupations: Actress; stage director

Michele Shay (born in 1955) is an American actress and stage director.

== Life and career ==
Born in Tuskegee, Alabama, Shay is the daughter of a veterinarian father and an accountant mother who later turned probation officer. After initially planning a social worker career, she eventually decided to embrace acting following her personal success in a school variety show. She got a Bachelor of Fine Arts from Carnegie Mellon University, and later received an honorary Master of Fine Arts from the American Conservatory Theater in San Francisco. She made her professional debut at the Cincinnati Playhouse in the Park, in The Balcony by Jean Genet.

After being part of the Guthrie Theater stage company for three years, Shay worked both in Broadway and Off-Broadway works, as well as in regional playhouse productions. In 1981, Shay won an Obie Award for Distinguished Performance by an Actress for her performance in Meetings. She got large personal success for her performance in Seven Guitars by August Wilson, who personally chose her to play the role of Louise. The play debuted on Broadway in 1996, and Shay got a Tony Award nomination for Best Featured Actress in a Play. She appeared as Mama in Cincinnati's Playhouse in the Park's 2023 production of Stew.

Shay also worked on television and films, directed numerous plays, and taught acting in several institutions, including the Michigan University, the California Institute of the Arts, the American Conservatory Theater, and the University of North Carolina School of the Arts.
