= Joe Turner's Come and Gone =

Play written by August Wilson

- Written by: August Wilson
- Original language: English
- Series: The Pittsburgh Cycle
- Subject: The lives of spirited boarders in a lodging house
- Genre: Drama
- Setting: Seth Holly's boarding house in Pittsburgh in 1911

Premiere
- Date premiered: 1984
- Place premiered: Eugene O'Neill Theater Center; Waterford, Connecticut

Joe Turner's Come and Gone is a play by American playwright August Wilson. It is the second installment of his decade-by-decade chronicle of the African-American experience, The Pittsburgh Cycle, also known as The American Century Cycle. The play was first workshopped in 1984 at the Eugene O'Neill Theater Center and opened on Broadway in 1988. It received Broadway revivals in 2009 and 2026.

== Title and contextual information ==
The original working title of the play was Mill Hand's Lunch Bucket, the title of a painting by Romare Bearden. The title Joe Turner's Come and Gone is a line from the refrain of "Joe Turner", an early blues song.

Joe Turner's Come and Gone is the second in a series of August Wilson's The Pittsburgh Cycle (also called The Century Cycle), which chronicled the struggles and lives of African Americans in the 20th century. Joe Turner's Come and Gone is set in the second decade of the 20th century and chronicles the lives of several freed formerly enslaved African-Americans in the North and explores the themes of racism and discrimination.

== Plot synopsis ==
=== Act One ===
Scene one: Set in the 1910s, the audience is introduced to Seth Holly's boardinghouse, where Seth and his wife Bertha are in the kitchen watching Bynum in the backyard. Seth is complaining to Bertha about Bynum's strange spiritual activities. Bertha tells Seth to let him be as he isn't bothering anyone. They also talk about Jeremy, a young man staying in the boardinghouse, getting arrested the night before for supposedly being drunk in public. Seth then has a monologue about the poor situation that the freed slaves are in after traveling up North. He worries that the African Americans are too naïve and that all the promises of jobs in the North will be taken by the poor white Americans. Then Rutherford Selig, the People Finder, comes to order dustpans from Seth, a maker of pots and pans. Then Bynum talks about an adventure that he once took up river where he found the "shiny man", a man he found on the road that offered to explain to him the Secret of Life. He had a spiritual encounter with the man, and sees the ghost of his father, telling him to find his song in life. His song, he later explains, is the Binding Song, which he uses to bind people to one another. Selig leaves and Jeremy enters, and after getting a scolding from Seth, he tells him that the white cops came and picked him up for no reason and that he was, in fact, not drunk at all. Then Herald Loomis and his daughter Zonia enter, looking for a place to stay for the week. They reveal that he is looking for his wife, Martha. After Seth shows them to their room, Jeremy relates a story about his guitar-playing abilities and how he is wary of playing for white men or money because of a bad experience. Bynum convinces Jeremy to go down to a bar to play for some money. Seth confides in Bynum and Bertha his lack of confidence in Loomis, and thinks that he is a "mean looking" man and he doesn't want to help him find his wife because of it. After this Mattie Campbell enters, looking for Bynum because she has heard that he can "fix things". Her man, Jack, has up and left her, but she wants him to come back. Bynum tells her that he can only bind people that wish to be bound; that she is better off just letting him find his own path in life. Jeremy intervenes and suggests that Mattie stays with him as to cure both of their loneliness. The scene ends with Zonia and Reuben, the little boy from next door. Reuben discloses Bynum's odd tendencies to Zonia and tells her a story about his friend Eugene that used to sell pigeons to Bynum so he could use their blood in his rituals.

Scene two: It is a week later and the audience again finds Seth and Bertha eating breakfast in the kitchen. Seth is still worried about Loomis's intentions and doesn't like the look of the man. He suspects that he knows who Loomis's wife is but won't tell him because he is worried about what he will do once he finds her. Selig returns to the house to pick up the dustpans that Seth has made for him and Loomis pays him to try to find his wife because Bynum tells him that Selig is the People Finder.

Scene three: It is the next day and yet again we find Seth and Bertha in the kitchen. Seth is upset because he can't find anyone to front him the money to make a new factory for making pots and pans. Then Bynum and Jeremy talk about the importance of being in love with a woman and how being with a woman is all a man needs in life. Then the last boarder enters, Molly Cunningham. She is also looking for a place to stay because she missed her train to Cincinnati. Jeremy takes a liking to Molly's appearance.

Scene four: Again they are in the kitchen of the boardinghouse when the scene opens. The group has just finished eating dinner when Seth suggests they "juba"- an African-style call-and-response song and dance. Herald Loomis enters and demands that they stop the singing. He goes into an episode where he talks in tongues and falls to the floor. He starts recalling a religious hallucination and Bynum has to calm him down and take him upstairs.

=== Act Two ===
Scene one: Seth informs Loomis that he has to leave the boardinghouse because he thinks that Loomis was drunk when he had his episode. Seth tells him that he runs a respectable house and won't put up with any shenanigans. Loomis and Zonia have until the next Saturday to leave the house. Bynum, Molly and Mattie are left in the kitchen where they talk about how children often follow in their parents' footsteps. Molly asserts that she will never follow her father's path and that she will always be a strong, independent woman. Mattie leaves for Doc Goldblum's, where she cleans and irons for work. Jeremy returns to the house from work and reveals to Seth that he would not give a white foreman 50 cents to keep his job so he was fired. Seth thinks it was an idiotic choice because now he is out of a job and no longer makes $8 a week. Molly tells Jeremy that he could easily get his job back by simply returning to work. Jeremy then asks Molly to travel around with him because he needs a woman that is independent and knows what she wants. Molly agrees but refuses to return to the South.

Scene two: Bynum and Seth are playing a game of dominoes and Bynum is singing a song about Joe Turner. Loomis asks Bynum to stop because he is uncomfortable with the song. Bynum reveals that he knew all along that Loomis was taken away by Joe Turner and that he needs to find his song in order to start his life again. Loomis relates his story to Bynum and Seth, telling them that he was taken by Joe Turner's men while trying to preach to some gambling African Americans. He spent seven years on Turner's chain gang and only survived by the thought of his wife and daughter. He tells them that after seven years he returned home to find that his wife had left and his daughter was living with her grandmother. The scene ends with Loomis being skeptical of Bynum and his voodoo abilities.

Scene three: The scene opens with Bertha reassuring Mattie that she will find everything that she wants and needs in life and that she just has to be patient. The scene ends with Loomis telling Mattie that he's noticed her watching him and that he finds her attractive. He goes to touch her, however, but feels awkward and says "I done forgot how to touch".

Scene four: It is the next morning and Zonia and Reuben are in the yard. Reuben tells Zonia that he has seen the ghost of Seth's mother earlier that morning and she made him keep his promise to Eugene and release the pigeons. They marvel at the idea that people could come back to life in the form of spirits. Reuben then asks Zonia if he can kiss her on the lips and she agrees. They decide that later in life they will find each other to get married.

Scene five: In the final scene Loomis and Zonia leave the boardinghouse as it is Saturday. Bertha tells Mattie that all she needs in life is love and laughing- which they all start to do. Then Martha Pentecost [Loomis] enters with Selig looking for Loomis and Zonia. Loomis reenters with Zonia and he recounts the last decade of his life; his search for her and the heartache it has caused him. Martha tells him that she has moved on with her life because she couldn't wait for him any longer. Martha also reveals that she had Bynum put a binding spell on her and Zonia and that is why they have come to find each other. Loomis goes into a rage and pulls out a knife. He denounces his Christian background and slashes his chest. The stage directions read "Having found his song, the song of self-sufficiency, fully resurrected, cleansed and given breath, free from any encumbrance other than the workings of his own heart and the bonds of the flesh, having accepted the responsibility for his own presence in the world, he is free to soar above the environs that weighed and pushed his spirit into terrifying contractions." He leaves and the play ends with Bynum yelling: "Herald Loomis, you shining! You shining like new money!"

== Character guide and analysis ==
Seth Holly - In his early fifties, Seth is owner of the boardinghouse and works as a craftsman. Born of free African-American parents in the North, he is set in his ways, never losing his composure and always running a respectable house. He even condemns other African Americans that do not follow this kind of lifestyle. He is economically very capitalistic and does whatever is necessary to stay afloat, including working night shifts and odd craftsman jobs he can pick up from Selig. He understands his world on a very literal level, and doesn't aspire to become more than he is.

Bertha Holly - Seth's wife of 25 years and five years his junior, Bertha runs the boardinghouse. She does all the cooking and cleaning, later with the aid of Zonia. As Seth's wife, She knows her place in the hierarchy of the boardinghouse, yet still has some say in the decision making and will often voice her opinion. A very loving mother to the boardinghouse family. In the end, she tells Mattie that the only two things you need in your life are love and laughter, the things that she has had faith in and have helped her get by.

Bynum Walker - A "conjure" man staying with the Holly's at the boardinghouse, Bynum is in his sixties and is a freed slave from the south. Also comfortable with his identity as an African conjurer, Bynum is one of few characters that understand their own identity. Convinced of the fact that everyone has their own song, Bynum perpetuates the theme of identity and our constant search for it.

Rutherford Selig - The only white character in the play, Selig is a peddler who sells Seth's goods. Known as the "People Finder", Selig is from a family that first brought Africans across the Atlantic to become slaves. But now he unites people by recording the names and places of all the people he peddles to. This suspicion of a white peddler perpetuates the mistrust between the races in the North and histories repetition. Selig's identity is well enforced with the history of his ancestors and the professions that he and they chose.

Jeremy Furlow - Another resident of the boardinghouse, Jeremy is a guitar-playing 25-year-old. He came to the North looking for a job and a way in life. He works construction, putting in the new road outside of town. A generation younger than the Hollys, Jeremy represents a young generation without a purpose and trying to find its own identity as the first liberated slaves. Jeremy's "blues playing" character is classified as a suave, artist young man looking to make a quick buck and travel the nation. He is constantly seeking the attention of the women in his vicinity and tries to find the perfect girl for himself.

Herald Loomis - An odd man who dons an overcoat and hat in mid-August, Loomis is 32 and a displaced man searching for his wife. He was forced to work for Joe Turner for seven years, which separated him from his wife and daughter. He works as a deacon for the Abundant Life Church and at times was possessed by spiritual beings. Having been enslaved by Joe Turner for seven years, Loomis has completely lost his way in life. In the end, he finds his song, an independent, self-sufficient song that he can sing proudly.

Zonia Loomis - Herald's daughter, Zonia is described as a tall and skinny 11-year-old. Like Reuben, Zonia represents the next innocent, malleable generation. There is a sense that history will repeat itself if the proceeding generation is not taught differently.

Mattie Campbell - Mattie is a 25-year-old woman who is disappointed with her position in life and is looking for love. Originally seeking out Bynum at Seth's boardinghouse, Mattie ends up living there after Jeremy invites her to stay with him after her boyfriend, Jack, left her. In her desperate search for love, Mattie represents a naïve, inexperienced group of young freed slaves that have moved North in search of prosperity. Mattie requires a man to complete her identity, she is weak and subservient, what she would be used to as a Southern slave.

Reuben Mercer - Reuben is the Hollys' next-door neighbor and about Zonia's age. Reuben represents the repetitiveness of history. Even as an adolescent, Reuben is aware of his place in society, notices the spiritual differences of people around him, and decides at a very early age that he needs a woman who he can find in to settle down with and marry. Many of the ideals that are seen in the adult characters of this play are instilled in Reuben and will repeat, the good and the bad, as he grows into adulthood.

Molly Cunningham - Molly is a good looking young woman of 26 who is strong and independent. Molly represents the opposite of Mattie. Molly is young, attractive, and independent. Unwilling to let herself be told what to do anymore, by anyone, Molly is convinced that she will never return to the South and refuses to be associated with anything that her old life entailed.

Martha Pentecost - Loomis' wife, Martha is about 28 and very religious and a member of the Evangelical church. She left the South and her daughter behind. Like Molly, Martha is an independent African-American woman. She attempted to escape the racial persecution but still finds it in the North. For strength, she rejects her African identity and turns to Christianity. She does what it takes to ensure her self-preservation and remains a strong, self-sufficient woman until the end.

Joe Turner - While Turner does not make an actual appearance in the play, he is often referred to with the expectation that the audience is aware of who he is. Joe Turner, the brother of the governor of Tennessee, would kidnap black men and force them into labor on his chain gang for seven years. Joe Turner is more of a representational character in this play than a literal character. By illegally kidnapping Black men, Turner represents the evil of the Southern, racist white man. He is based on the person of Joe Turney, brother of Tennessee governor Peter Turney. See pages 53ff. in Conversations with August Wilson: "Joe Turner was the brother of Pete Turner, who was the governor of Tennessee, who would press Negroes in peonage." Also, see W. C. Handy's autobiography, p. 145: "It goes back to Joe Turney (also called Turner), brother of Pete Turney, one-time governor of Tennessee. Joe had the responsibility of taking Negro prisoners from Memphis to the penitentiary at Nashville. Sometimes he took them to the "farms" along the Mississippi. Their crimes when indeed there were any crimes, were usually very minor, the object of the arrests being to provide needed labor for spots along the river. As usual, the method was to set a stool-pigeon where he could start a game of craps. The bones would roll blissfully till the required number of laborers had been drawn into the circle. At that point the law would fall upon the poor devils, arrest as many as were needed for work, try them for gambling in a kangaroo court and then turn the culprits over to Joe Turney. That night, perhaps, there would be weeping and wailing among the dusky belles. If one of them chanced to ask a neighbor what had become of the sweet good man, she was likely to receive the pat reply, 'They tell me Joe Turner's come and gone.'"

== Content ==
=== Style ===
In a review of the Ethel Barrymore staging of the play, Clive Barnes commented on the language, idiom, and mix of naturalism and symbolism, complimenting the staging and the cast for developing the work to a heartrending climax.

=== Language ===
Much like the style of the play, the language used in Joe Turner is realistic in nature and depicts that of the dialogue of the day. Each of the characters has a specific rhythm and speech pattern. The dialogue of the characters also reflects the accents that the characters would have had; like Seth's Pennsylvanian twang and Loomis's Southern drawl. And according to Anne Fleche, there is a lack of suspense or surprise in the dialogue and the comfort of the language of the characters encourages the theme of reoccurring, oppressing experiences.

=== Themes/ideas ===
The major themes in Joe Turner's Come and Gone are identity, migration, and racial discrimination. These core themes are ones August Wilson tends to use in many of his plays:

- Identity: The most prominent theme in Joe Turner is the idea of identity. Each of the characters, whether or not they realize it, is looking for his or her identity as an American, African, man, woman, businessman, and/or artist. As Alen Nadel describes, "For each of the characters, that quest for humanity is for a form of completeness which their circumstances, and history, has denied them. It may be economic security or fair employment practices, or a mate, or a family." (96) Just because the Civil War decided the emancipation of slaves did not mean that human rights for the freed slaves were guaranteed. African Americans had to fight to find an identity in a strange, hostile environment while trying to hold on to their African roots.
- Migration: The shuffling of people after the emancipation of the slaves caused many social and cultural issues throughout the nation. Along with the freedom to move about came the idea that no matter your background, there would be somewhere in the country that you could get by economically, if not be successful.
- Racial discrimination: Even though there seems to be a promise of jobs and freedom in the North, it often seems as racially divided as the South. Jeremy runs into the most discrimination, although all of the characters feel the effects of intolerance. Not only does discrimination affect the residents of the boardinghouse, but there is an even deeper level of exploitation seen throughout the play. Selig gets paid to find people that he relocates, white police officers take Jeremy's money, as does the foreman at his job building the road, and Selig is always trying to get a better price out of Seth for his labor. Even though the Civil War has ended, the African Americans were still being treated as objects rather than human beings.

=== Spectacle ===
Most of the spectacle in Joe Turner's Come and Gone is related to the spirituality and religious qualities of the characters. Bynum is often performing what characters in the play refer to as voodoo activities. In the beginning of the play he is referred to as spilling the blood of the pigeons and has interesting, different good luck charms and untraditional remedies. Also when Loomis becomes possessed by the Holy Spirit at the end of act one requires some spectacular situations and portrayals. Along with this "possession" is the juba song that requires the singing and dancing that is "as African as possible" with Seth playing harmonica, Bynum singing and drumming, and Jeremy playing guitar.

However, most of the play isn't much spectacle at all. Mostly it chronicles the everyday lives of the residents of the boardinghouse. Some critics of the play even criticize the length of the play and say the play had "little action and but scenes with people yelling at each other". In this way the play structure follows the realism genre in that it depicts real life on stage, with everyday activities being performed; like cooking, cleaning, etc.

=== Music ===
Music within this community seems to be a pivotal social catalyst. Many of the character either play an instrument or sing; Seth plays the harmonica, Jeremy plays the guitar, and Zonia and Bynum both sing within the play. Zonia is heard at the end of the first scene of act one "singing and playing a game". This playground song is completely innocent in manner and talks about a young girl that often makes mistakes. This song is used to further Zonia's characterization by showing her as the most innocent character in the play. Jeremy plays the guitar, which also has a typical connotation connected with the character Jeremy portrays. He is the naïve, young character that is fresh to the world. Like his guitar, Jeremy is hip and often represents popular, youthful culture. Seth plays the harmonica during the juba that is performed onstage. The juba is described as:

The Juba is reminiscent of the ring shouts of the African slaves. It is a call and response dance. Bynum sits at the table and drums. He calls the dance as other clap hands, shuffle, and stomp around the table. It should be as African as possible, with the performers working themselves up into a near frenzy. The words can be improvised, but should include some mention of the Holy Ghost.

This song is a way for the African Americans to relate with one another and continue their relationship with their heritage. Finally, Bynum is often seen and heard singing throughout the show. The first time he sings is to lighten the mood from the work they are doing. Then later he sings about Joe Turner kidnapping slaves and forcing them to work on his chain gang. Bynum's singing is a characterization of his wisdom and age. He seems to know a song for all occasions and characters. Not only does he physically sing on stage, Bynum's character also refers to "finding your song". Music is so important to this man that each person's soul and purpose in life is characterized by their song.

Wilson has also been known to be greatly influenced by the blues music period. The title of the play, for instance, is a line from a blues song and the idea of stealing one's song is a great tragedy. Also, music also perpetuates the racial issues of the day as Jeremy is often shot down by white men for musical abilities.

== Cast and characters ==
Characters	Original Broadway cast 1988	First Broadway revival 2009	Second Broadway revival 2026
Seth Holly	Mel Winkler	Ernie Hudson	Cedric the Entertainer
Bertha Holly	L. Scott Caldwell	LaTanya Richardson Jackson	Taraji P. Henson
Bynum Walker	Ed Hall	Roger Robinson	Ruben Santiago-Hudson
Rutherford Selig	Raynor Scheine	Arliss Howard	Bradley Stryker
Jeremy Furlow	Bo Rucker	André Holland	Tripp Taylor
Herald Loomis	Delroy Lindo	Chad L. Coleman	Joshua Boone
Zonia Loomis	Jamila Perry	Amari Rose Leigh	Savannah Commodore; Dominique Skye Turner
Mattie Campbell	Kimberleigh Aarn	Marsha Stephanie Blake	Nimene Sierra Wureh
Reuben Mercer	Richard Parnell Habersham	Michael Cummings	Jackson Edward Davis; Christopher Woodley
Molly Cunningham	Kimberly Scott	Aunjanue Ellis	Maya Boyd
Martha Pentecost	Angela Bassett	Danai Gurira	Abigail C. Onwunali

== Sample production history ==
The play had its first staged reading in 1984 at the Eugene O'Neill Theater Center in Waterford, Connecticut. Joe Turner's Come and Gone officially opened in 1986 at the Yale Repertory Theatre.

Later, for its press review, it opened on March 26, 1988, at the Ethel Barrymore Theatre on Broadway in New York City, running for 105 performances, with a cast featuring Mel Winkler, L. Scott Caldwell, Ed Hall, Raynor Scheine, Bo Rucker, Delroy Lindo, Jamila Perry, Kimberleigh Aarn, Richard Parnell Habersham, Kimberly Scott, and Angela Bassett. The director was Lloyd Richards. The production featured work by set designer Scott Bradley, costume designer Pamela Peterson, lighting designer Michael Giannitti, musical director Dwight Andrews, production stage manager Karen L. Carpenter, stage manager Elliott Woodruff, and casting consultants Meg Simon and Fran Kumin.

A Broadway revival directed by Bartlett Sher opened at the Belasco Theatre on March 19, 2009 in previews and officially on April 16, closing June 14 after 69 performances.

A 2013 production was performed at the Mark Taper Forum in Los Angeles, California. It was directed by Phylicia Rashad, who won an NAACP Theatre Award for her work.

In 2024, the official custodian of Wilson's legacy, actor Denzel Washington, announced that Joe Turner's Come and Gone would be the fourth Wilson play adapted for the screen in his deal with Netflix. No further production details have been announced at this time. A new production opened at the Goodman Theatre in Chicago on April 13, 2024.

On 30 June 2025, a second Broadway revival of Joe Turner's Come and Gone was announced by producer Brian Anthony Moreland to take place in spring 2026. The production starred Taraji P. Henson and Cedric the Entertainer and was directed by Debbie Allen.

== Awards and nominations ==
=== 1988 Broadway premiere ===
Year	Award	Category	Work	Result	Ref.
1988	Tony Award	Best Play		Nominated	
1988	Tony Award	Best Direction of a Play	Lloyd Richards	Nominated	
1988	Tony Award	Best Featured Actress in a Play	L. Scott Caldwell	Won	
1988	Tony Award	Best Featured Actress in a Play	Kimberleigh Aarn	Nominated	
1988	Tony Award	Best Featured Actress in a Play	Kimberly Scott	Nominated	
1988	Tony Award	Best Featured Actor in a Play	Delroy Lindo	Nominated	
1988	Tony Award	Best Lighting Design for a Play	Brian MacDevitt	Won	
1988	Drama Desk	Outstanding Play		Nominated	
1988	New York Drama Critics Circle Award	Best Play		Won	

=== 2009 Broadway revival ===
Year	Award	Category	Work	Result	Ref.
2009	Tony Award	Best Revival of a Play		Nominated	
2009	Tony Award	Best Featured Actor in a Play	Roger Robinson	Won	
2009	Tony Award	Best Direction of a Play	Bartlett Sher	Nominated	
2009	Tony Award	Best Scenic Design of a Play	Michael Yeargan	Nominated	
2009	Tony Award	Best Sound Design of a Play	Scott Lehrer and Leon Rothenberg	Nominated	
2009	Theatre World Award	Outstanding Debut	Chad L. Coleman	Won	

=== 2014 Los Angeles production ===
Year	Award	Category	Work	Result	Ref.
2014	NAACP Theatre Award	Best Director - Equity	Phylicia Rashad	Won	

=== 2026 Broadway revival ===
Year	Award	Category	Work	Result	Ref.
2026	Drama Desk Awards	Outstanding Featured Performance in a Play	Ruben Santiago-Hudson	Won	
2026	Drama Desk Awards	Outstanding Costume Design of a Play	Paul Tazewell	Won	
2026	Outer Critics Circle Award	Outstanding Revival of a Play		Nominated	
2026	Outer Critics Circle Award	Outstanding Direction of a Play	Debbie Allen	Nominated	
2026	Outer Critics Circle Award	Outstanding Featured Performer in a Broadway Play	Ruben Santiago-Hudson	Nominated	
2026	Drama League Award	Outstanding Revival of a Play		Nominated	
2026	Drama League Award	Outstanding Direction of a Play	Debbie Allen	Nominated	
2026	Drama League Award	Distinguished Performance	Ruben Santiago-Hudson	Nominated	
2026	Tony Awards	Best Featured Actor in a Play	Ruben Santiago-Hudson	Nominated	
2026	Tony Awards	Best Original Score (Music and/or Lyrics) Written for the Theatre	Steve Bargonetti (music)	Nominated	
2026	Tony Awards	Best Costume Design of a Play	Paul Tazewell	Nominated	
2026	Tony Awards	Best Lighting Design of a Play	Stacey Derosier	Nominated	
2026	Tony Awards	Best Sound Design of a Play	Justin Ellington	Nominated	
