= Anthony Chisholm (actor) =

American actor (1943–2020)

- Born: April 9, 1943; Cleveland, Ohio, United States
- Died: October 16, 2020 (aged 77); Montclair, New Jersey
- Occupation: Actor
- Years active: 1968–2020
- Spouses: Valerie Moore (div); Gloria Nixon (div)
- Awards: AUDELCO Award; Drama Desk Award; IRNE Award; NAACP Theatre Award; Obie Award; Ovation Award

Anthony Chisholm (April 9, 1943 – October 16, 2020) was an American actor.

== Early life ==
Chisholm was born and grew up in Cleveland, Ohio. Chisholm was drafted into the U.S. Army in 1964 and served as a platoon leader in Vietnam.

== Career ==
=== Stage ===
Chisholm's stage career began with performances in The Boys from Syracuse and The Threepenny Opera, and includes appearances on Broadway and regional theatres such as Yale Repertory Theater in Connecticut.

He was nominated for a Tony Award for Best Supporting Actor in a play, for his role of Elder Joseph Barlow in August Wilson's Radio Golf (2007). He also performed on Broadway in August Wilson's Gem of the Ocean (2004) in the role of Solly Two Kings, in Two Trains Running (1992) in the role of Wolf, and in Jitney (2017) as Fielding.

He is a winner of both the Drama Desk Award and the Obie Award for August Wilson's Jitney, which enjoyed a ten-month run in New York City. He is also the recipient of the NAACP Theatre Award, the AUDELCO Award, the Ovation Award, and the IRNE Award.

He also received nominations for the Drama Desk Awards (2), Drama League Award (1), Joseph Jefferson Award (4), Ovation Award (4), NAACP Theatre Awards (2), and AUDELCO Award (2).

He performed internationally in the hit Vietnam play, Tracers, at The Seymour Center, Sydney, Australia; the Universal Theatre, Melbourne, Australia; the Royal Court Theatre, London, England. He also performed Jitney at National Theatre, London on the South Bank winning the Olivier Award for Best New Play.

=== Screen ===
Chisholm played Burr Redding on the HBO television series Oz for three seasons. He appears in the films Premium Rush and Chi-Raq.

== Personal life ==
Chisholm married Valerie Moore in 1972 which ended in divorce, and Gloria Nixon in 1979, which also ended in divorce.

Chisholm died in Montclair, New Jersey at the age of 77.

== Filmography ==
=== Film ===
- Uptight (film) (1968) (uncredited)
- Putney Swope (1969) – Cowboy #3
- Cotton Comes to Harlem (1970) – Plain Clothes Man
- Let's Get Bizzee (1993) – Dillon
- Beloved (1998) – Langhorne
- Bought & Sold (2003) – Floyd
- Coalition (2004) – Pastor
- Reign Over Me (2007) – William Johnson
- Blackout (2007) – Toothless Tone
- Alone (2008, short) – Space Cowboy
- Entre nos (2009) – Joe
- Dream Street (2010)
- 13 (2010) – Mr. Gomez
- Premium Rush (2012) – Tito
- Newlyweeds (2013) – Devin
- Nasty Baby (2015) – Mo's father David
- Condemned (2015) – Shynola
- Chi-Raq (2015) – Mr. Doctor Aesop
- Bakery in Brooklyn (2016) – Nathan
- Going in Style (2017) – Knights Grandmaster Paul
- Train Baby (2019) – His Father
- The Dark End of the Street (2020) – Ian

=== Television ===
Anthony Chisholm television credits
| Year | Title | Role | Notes | Ref. |
|---|---|---|---|---|
| 1971 | Great Performances | Servant to Cornwall | Episode: King Lear | |
| 1981 | Death of a Prophet | Tony Chisholm | TV movie | |
| 1996 | New York Undercover | Freddy Wells | Episode: "Unis" | |
| 2001 | Third Watch | Eric | Episode: "Adam 55-3" | |
| 2001–2003 | Oz | Burr Redding | 23 episodes | |
| 2002 | 100 Centre Street | Wally Zane | Episode: "Zero Tolerance" | |
| 2002 | Law & Order: Special Victims Unit | Leroy Russell | Episode: "Execution" | |
| 2002–2003 | Hack | Big Elwood | Episodes: "Songs in the Night" & "Black Eye" | |
| 2003 | The Handler | Frederick Speed | Episode: "Under Color of Law" | |
| 2010 | Detroit 1-8-7 | George | Episode: "Nobody's Home / Unknown Soldier" | |
| 2016 | Shades of Blue | Moses | Episode: "What Devil Do" | |
| 2018 | High Maintenance | Mr. Chase | Episode: "Namaste" | |
| 2018 | Random Acts of Flyness | Uncle Ren | 4 episodes | |
| 2019 | Wu-Tang: An American Saga | Old Chess Player | 3 episodes | |
