= Huntington Theatre Company =

Professional theatre located in Boston, Massachusetts

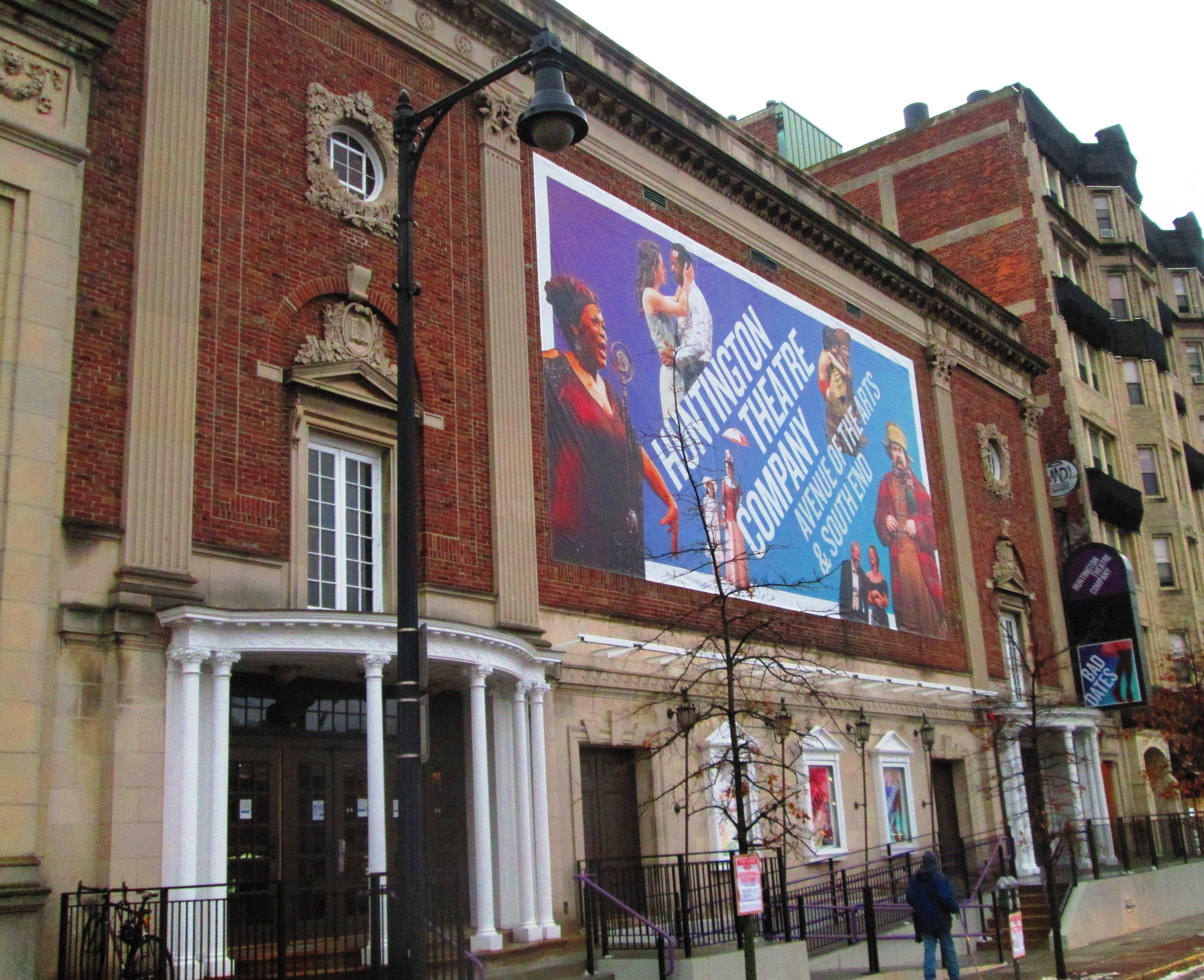
The Huntington Avenue Theatre

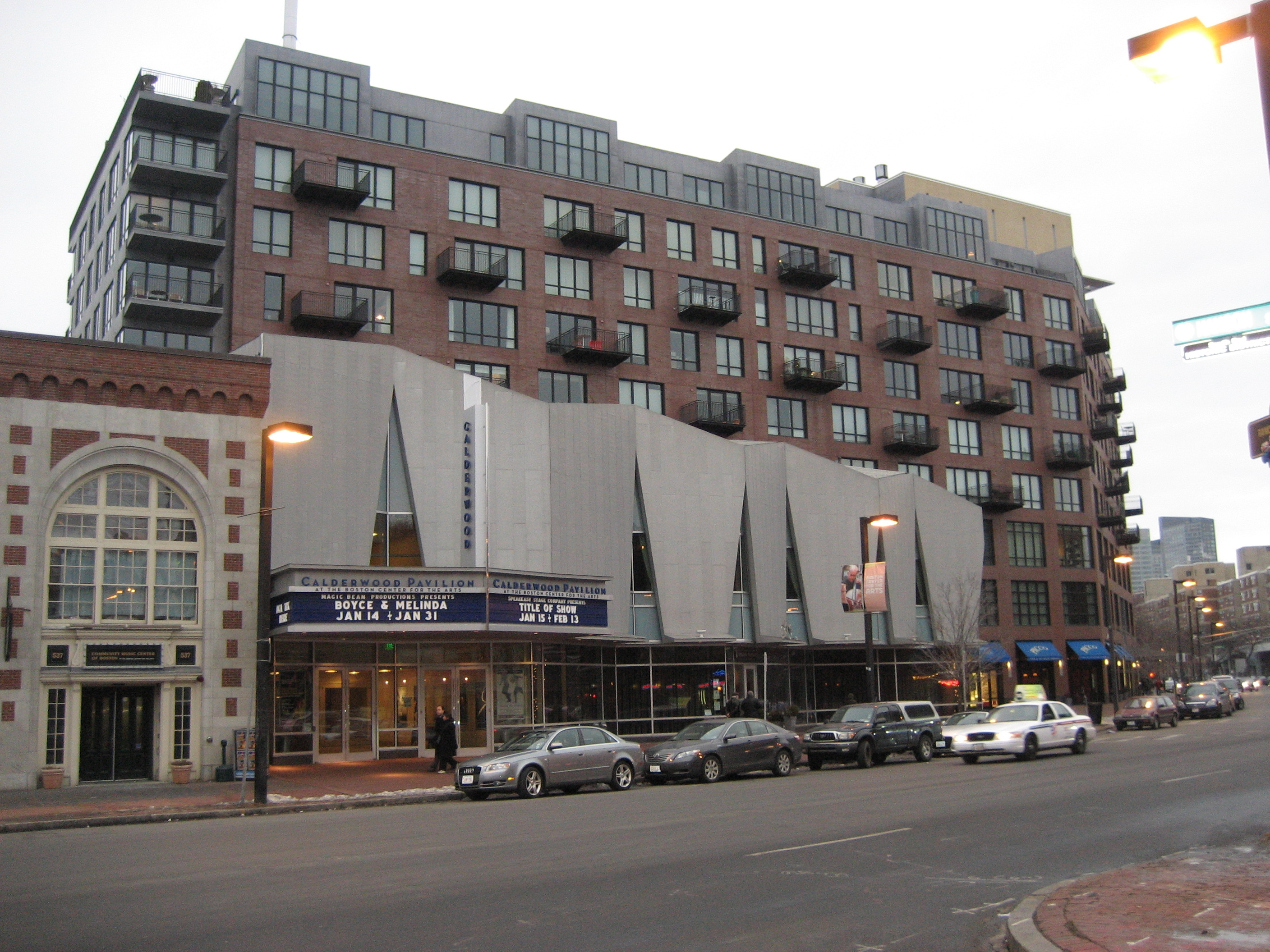
The Calderwood Pavilion on Tremont Street.

The Huntington Theatre Company is a professional theatre located in Boston, Massachusetts and the recipient of the 2013 Regional Theatre Tony Award, under the direction of Managing Director Michael Maso. It is notable for its longstanding artistic relationship with African-American playwright August Wilson.

== History ==
The Huntington was founded in 1982 by the Boston University under President John Silber and Vice President Gerald Gross, and was separately incorporated as an independent non-profit in 1986. Its two prior artistic leaders were Peter Altman (1982 – 2000) and Nicholas Martin (2000 – 2008). Michael Maso has led the Huntington's administrative and financial operations since 1982 as the Managing Director.

In 2016, as a result of Boston University's decision to sell the BU Theatre on Huntington Avenue, the Huntington Theatre Company and Boston University dissolved their relationship. The new owners of the BU Theatre Complex, QMG Huntington LLC, proposed the creation of a new condo tower, while also allowing the Huntington to lease the renovated theatre space for $1 per year for the next 99 years. Construction was originally projected to be completed in late 2020. However, the project was delayed by the pandemic, and the renovated theatre reopened in October 2022. The renovation project won an award from the Boston Preservation Alliance. Construction of the 34-story residential tower adjacent to the theatre began in 2022. The tower will include 14,000 square feet of space devoted to a new lobby for the theatre.

In October 2020, the company's artistic leader, Peter DuBois, resigned after an inquiry prompted by staff complaints of layoffs, diversity issues, and salary transparency. In February 2022, Loretta Greco was named the company's new artistic director. In January 2023, the company announced that Michael Maso would step down as Managing Director in June 2023, after 41 years with the company.

=== Response to the COVID-19 pandemic ===
Due to the COVID-19 pandemic the company put their 2020–21 season on an indefinite hold. The Huntington projected losses due to the pandemic of $6.3 million. During the summer of 2020, the company furloughed 46 staff members, laid off 11 people, and eliminated positions.

In July, 2020, the company launched a series of miniature audioplays, collectively known as "Dream Boston," challenging local playwrights "to imagine favorite locations, landmarks, and their friends in a future Boston." Critics noted the importance of the series for keeping the Company relevant even while the theater was shuttered, noting "[t]he goal, it would seem, is twofold: on the one hand, by providing a venue to connect with remote audiences today, the series is keeping theater alive, for the present; at the same time, for those of us tuning in, closing our eyes, and connecting to these stories, we are encouraged to keep hope alive, for the future."

== Theatre facilities ==
The Huntington Avenue Theatre, located at 264 Huntington Avenue, was built in 1925 as the Repertory Theatre, and was designed by J. William Beal's Sons in the Georgian Revival style. The theatre is listed on the National Register of Historic Places. The company built and operates the Stanford Calderwood Pavilion at the Boston Center for the Arts, located at 527 Tremont Street. It houses the 360 seat Virginia Wimberly Theatre, the Nancy and Edward Roberts Studio Theatre, Carol G. Deane Hall, and Nicholas Martin Hall.

The Huntington also operates BostonTheatreScene.com where tickets are sold for productions at the Boston University Theatre, the BCA Theatres on the Plaza, and Calderwood Pavilion at the BCA.

== Notable productions ==
The Huntington has transferred 16 productions to New York, including two in 2012: the Broadway premiere of Lydia R. Diamond's Stick Fly and the Roundabout Theatre Company production of Stephen Karam's Sons of the Prophet, named a 2012 Pulitzer Prize finalist.

Eight of August Wilson's plays were produced at the Huntington before going on to premiere in New York. The Huntington's relationship with Wilson began in 1986 with a production of Wilson's third play, Joe Turner's Come and Gone. The theater has also staged Wilson's 10-play Century Cycle in its entirety.

== Outreach and education ==
The theater fosters new talent through its Huntington Playwriting Fellows program, Breaking Ground Festival, and Summer Workshop Program. Huntington productions of plays by Fellows include The Luck of the Irish by Kirsten Greenidge, Stick Fly by Lydia R. Diamond, The Atheist, Brendan, and The Second Girl by Ronan Noone, Psyched and “M” by Ryan Landry, The Cry of the Reed by Sinan Ünel, and A Guide for the Homesick by Ken Urban.

== Awards ==
The Huntington Theatre Company received the 2013 Tony Award for Best Regional Theatre.
