= Second Stage Theater =

Theater company in New York City

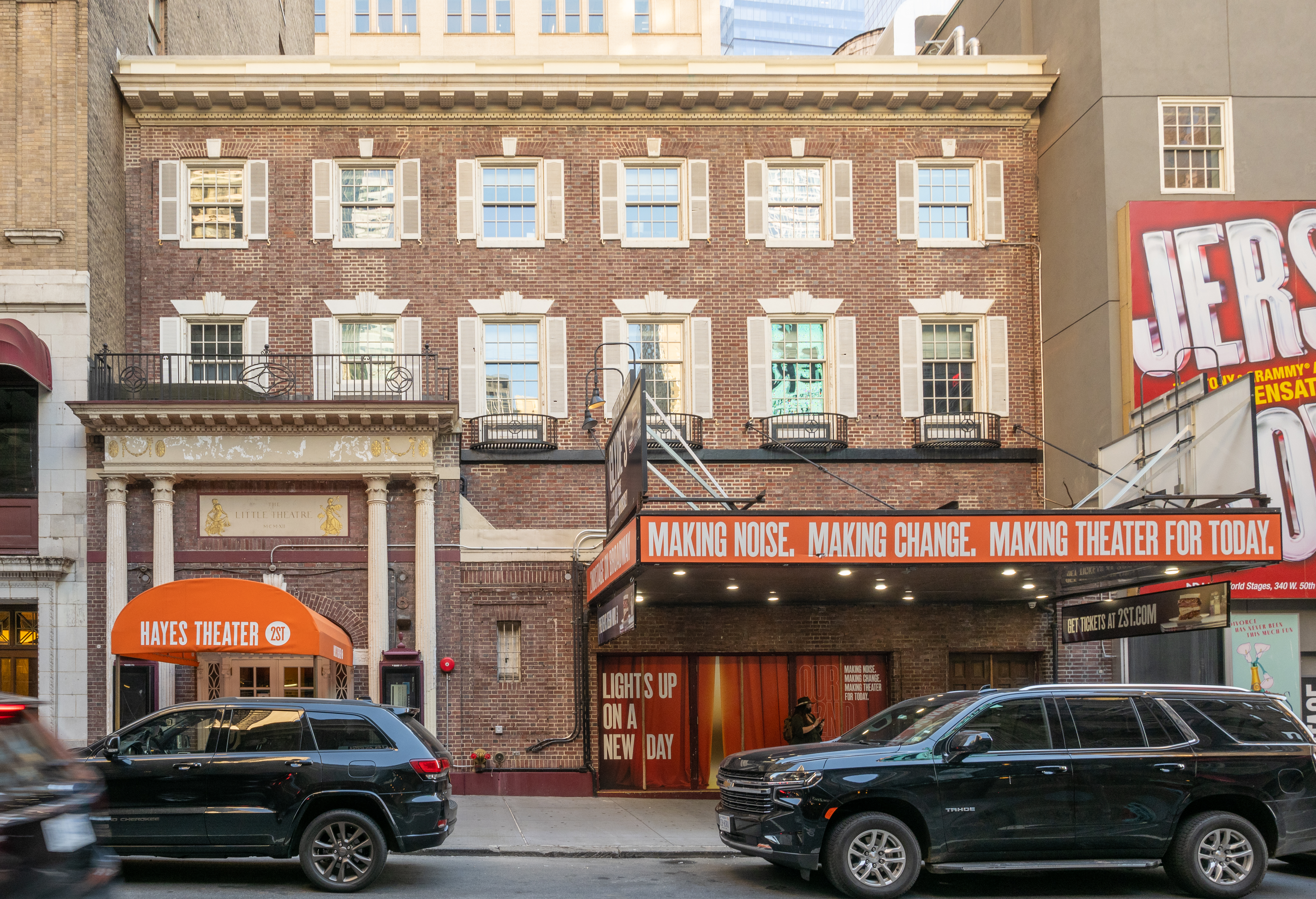
- Second Stage's Helen Hayes Theater
- Formation: 1979
- Type: Off-Broadway & Broadway
- Location: New York City, United States
- Coordinates: 40°45′28″N 73°59′16″W
- Artistic director: Evan Cabnet
- Website: 2st.com

Second Stage Theater is a non-profit theater company that presents work by living American writers both on and off Broadway. It is based in Midtown Manhattan, New York City, and is affiliated with the League of Resident Theatres.

Founded in 1979 by Robyn Goodman and Carole Rothman, Second Stage produces both new plays and revivals of contemporary American plays by new playwrights and established writers. In April 2015, the company expanded into Broadway theater productions when it bought the Helen Hayes Theater, at 240 West 44th Street in Manhattan. It also produces off-Broadway at the Pershing Square Signature Center.

== History ==
Robyn Goodman and Carole Rothman founded Second Stage Theater in 1979 to produce "second stagings" of contemporary American plays, later expanding to new works as well.

In 1982 they secured a permanent venue with the McGinn–Cazale Theater. In 1999, the company opened a new 296-seat venue, the 43rd Street Theater, designed by Dutch architect Rem Koolhaas; this location was renamed the Tony Kiser Theater in 2011. The Second Stage Theater Uptown series was inaugurated in 2002 to showcase the work of emerging artists at the McGinn–Cazale Theater at 76th Street.

Second Stage finalized its acquisition of the Helen Hayes Theater, a 597-seat Broadway theater at 240 West 44th Street, in April 2015 for $24.7 million. The first Second Stage production at the Hayes Theater was Lobby Hero in early 2018, after renovations and upgrades. Second Stage is one of four nonprofit theater companies that own and operate theaters on Broadway.

In 2023, Second Stage gave up its off-off-Broadway space, the McGinn–Cazale Theater. Founding artistic director and president Carole Rothman announced that September 2023 that she would resign from her position as Second Stage's artistic director at the end of the 2023–2024 season. In February 2024, Second Stage named Bennett Leak their interim artistic director for the 2024–25 season. Also in February 2024, Second Stage decided to let go of the Tony Kiser Theater, its off-Broadway space, at the end 2024, due to high rent and unfavorable lease terms. Second Stage plans to continue producing off-Broadway theater, and will reopen another off-Broadway space elsewhere. In June 2024, Evan Cabnet was hired as Second Stage's incoming artistic director in June 2024, succeeding Rothman.

== Awards and honors ==
The company's more than 180 citations include three 2024 Tony Awards for Appropriate (Best Revival of a Play; Best Actress in a Play, Sarah Paulson; Best Lighting Design, Jane Cox), two 2022 Tony Awards for Take Me Out (Best Revival of a Play; Best Featured Actor in a Play, Jesse Tyler Ferguson), six 2017 Tony Awards for Dear Evan Hansen including Best Musical, Best Book of a Musical (Steven Levenson), Best Original Score (Pasek & Paul), Best Performance by a Leading Actor in a Musical (Ben Platt), Best Performance by an Actress in a Featured Role in a Musical (Rachel Bay Jones), and Best Orchestrations (Alex Lacamoire), three 2009 Tony Awards for Next to Normal including Best Performance by a Leading Actress in a Musical (Alice Ripley), Best Original Score Written for the Theatre (Tom Kitt and Brian Yorkey), and Best Orchestrations (Tom Kitt and Michael Starobin), the 2007 Tony Award for Best Actress in a Play (Julie White) for The Little Dog Laughed, 2002 Tony Award for Best Director of a Play (Mary Zimmerman for Metamorphoses), the 2002 Lucille Lortel Award for Outstanding Body of Work, 28 Obie Awards including a 2017 Special Citation by the Obies for Anna Deavere Smith's Notes from the Field, seven Outer Critics Circle Awards, two Clarence Derwent Awards, 12 Drama Desk Awards, nine Theatre World Awards, 17 Lucille Lortel Awards, the Drama Critics' Circle Award and 23 AUDELCO Awards. In 2010 Next to Normal received the Pulitzer Prize for Drama.

In the following table, the seasons correspond to the year of the play's production; the ceremonies are traditionally held in the same or the following year as the production.

| Season | Production | Award | Category | Result |
|---|---|---|---|---|
| 1979–80 | How I Got That Story | Clarence Derwent Award | Best Performance – Bob Gunton | Won |
| 1979–80 | How I Got That Story | OBIE Award | Playwriting – Amlin Gray | Won |
| 1979–80 | How I Got That Story | OBIE Award | Performance – Bob Gunton | Won |
| 1979–80 | Split | OBIE Award | Best Actor – John Heard | Won |
| 1981–82 | My Sister in This House | OBIE Award | Distinguished Ensemble Performance | Won |
| 1981–82 | My Sister in This House | OBIE Award | Best Performance – Elizabeth McGovern | Won |
| 1981–82 | Pastorale | OBIE Award | Distinguished Performance – Christine Estabrook | Won |
| 1982–83 | Painting Churches | OBIE Award | Performance – Donald Moffat | Won |
| 1982–83 | Painting Churches | OBIE Award | Distinguished Playwriting – Tina Howe | Won |
| 1982–83 | Painting Churches | OBIE Award | Design – Heidi Landesman | Won |
| 1982–83 | Painting Churches | Outer Critics Circle Award | Best Actress – Marian Seldes | Won |
| 1982–83 | Painting Churches | Outer Critics Circle Award | Best New Playwright – Tina Howe | Won |
| 1983–84 | All Night Long | OBIE Award | Design – Adrienne Lobel | Won |
| 1983–84 | Serenading Louie | OBIE Award | Performance – Dianne Wiest | Won |
| 1985–86 | Lemon Sky | Drama Desk Award | Outstanding Revival | Nom |
| 1985–86 | Lemon Sky | Drama Desk Award | Outstanding Director – Mary B. Robinson | Nom |
| 1985–86 | Lemon Sky | Drama Desk Award | Outstanding Actor – Jeff Daniels | Nom |
| 1986–87 | Coastal Disturbances | Clarence Derwent Award | Best Performance – Annette Bening | Won |
| 1986–87 | Coastal Disturbances | Theatre World Award | Best Performance – Annette Bening | Won |
| 1986–87 | Coastal Disturbances | Theatre World Award | Best Performance – Timothy Daly | Won |
| 1986–87 | Coastal Disturbances | Tony Award | Best Play | Nom |
| 1986–87 | Coastal Disturbances | Tony Award | Best Director – Carole Rotheman | Nom |
| 1986–87 | Coastal Disturbances | Tony Award | Best Featured Actress – Annette Bening | Nom |
| 1986–87 | Little Murders | OBIE Award | Performance – Christine Lahti | Won |
| 1986–87 | Little Murders | OBIE Award | Design – Andrew Jackness | Won |
| 1987–88 | Spoils of War | Tony Award | Best Actress – Kate Nelligan | Nom |
| 1987–88 | The Film Society | New York's Newsday, Oppenheimer Award | New Playwright – Jon Robin Baitz | Won |
| 1987–88 | The Film Society | Drama Desk Award | Outstanding New Play – Jon Robin Baitz | Nom |
| 1989–90 | Square One | AT&T's New Plays for the '90s Award | Steve Tesich | Won |
| 1990–91 | Home and Away | Drama Desk Award | Best Solo Performer – Kevin Kling | Nom |
| 1990–91 | The Good Times are Killing Me | OBIE Award | Performance – Angela Goethals | Won |
| 1990–91 | The Good Times are Killing Me | Theatre World Award | Best Performance – Chandra Wilson | Won |
| 1991–92 | Before It Hits Home | AUDELCO Award | Playwright – Cheryl West | Won |
| 1991–92 | Before It Hits Home | AUDELCO Award | Director – Tazewell Thompson | Won |
| 1991–92 | Before It Hits Home | AUDELCO Award | Lead Actor – James McDaniel | Nom |
| 1991–92 | Before It Hits Home | AUDELCO Award | Lighting – Nancy Schertler | Nom |
| 1991–92 | Before It Hits Home | AUDELCO Award | Supporting Actor – Frankie Faison | Nom |
| 1991–92 | Before It Hits Home | AUDELCO Award | Sound – Susan White | Nom |
| 1991–92 | Before It Hits Home | Drama Desk Award | Best Actor in a Drama – James McDaniel | Nom |
| 1991–92 | Before It Hits Home | OBIE Award | Performance – James McDaniel | Won |
| 1991–92 | Red Diaper Baby | Drama Desk Award | Best Solo Performer – Josh Kornbluth | Nom |
| 1992–93 | One Shoe Off | Theatre World Award | Best Actress – Jennifer Tilly | Won |
| 1992–93 | Ricky Jay & His 52 Assistants | Lucille Lortel Award | Special Award for Unique Accomplishment | Won |
| 1992–93 | Ricky Jay & His 52 Assistants | OBIE Award | Special Citation | Won |
| 1994–95 | Crumbs From the Table of Joy | AUDELCO Award | Best Director of a Drama – Joe Morton | Nom |
| 1994–95 | Crumbs From the Table of Joy | AUDELCO Award | Best Actress in a Drama – Kisha Howard | Nom |
| 1994–95 | Crumbs From the Table of Joy | AUDELCO Award | Best Supporting Actress in a Drama – Ella Joyce | Nom |
| 1996–97 | Sympathetic Magic | OBIE Award | Playwrighting – Lanford Wilson | Won |
| 1998–99 | Jar the Floor | AUDELCO Award | Best Lighting Design – Donald Holder | Nom |
| 1998–99 | Jar the Floor | AUDELCO Award | Best Set Design – David Gallo | Nom |
| 1998–99 | Jar the Floor | AUDELCO Award | Best Sound Design – Janet Kalas | Nom |
| 1998–99 | Jar the Floor | AUDELCO Award | Best Directing/Dramatic Production – Marion McClinton | Nom |
| 1998–99 | Jar the Floor | AUDELCO Award | Best Playwright – Cheryl West | Nom |
| 1998–99 | Jar the Floor | AUDELCO Award | Best Outstanding Ensemble | Nom |
| 1998–99 | Jar the Floor | AUDELCO Award | Best Dramatic Production | Nom |
| 1998–99 | Jar the Floor | Drama Desk Award | Outstanding Actress – Lynne Thigpen | Nom |
| 1998–99 | Jar the Floor | OBIE Award | Sustained Excellence: Set Design – David Gallo | Won |
| 1998–99 | That Championship Season | Drama Desk Award | Outstanding Set Design of a Play, Allen Moyer | Won |
| 1998–99 | This Is Our Youth | Lucille Lortel Award | Outstanding Performance – Mark Ruffalo | Won |
| 1999–2000 | Chesapeake | Drama Desk Award | Outstanding Solo Performance – Mark Linn-Baker | Nom |
| 1999–2000 | Chesapeake | Outer Critics Circle Award | Outstanding Solo Performance – Mark Linn-Baker | Nom |
| 1999–2000 | Jitney | AUDELCO Award | Dramatic Production of the Year | Won |
| 1999–2000 | Jitney | AUDELCO Award | Playwright – August Wilson | Won |
| 1999–2000 | Jitney | AUDELCO Award | Outstanding Ensemble Performance | Won |
| 1999–2000 | Jitney | AUDELCO Award | Lighting Design – Donald Holder | Won |
| 1999–2000 | Jitney | AUDELCO Award | Set Design – David Gallo | Won |
| 1999–2000 | Jitney | AUDELCO Award | Costume Design – Susan Hilferty | Won |
| 1999–2000 | Jitney | AUDELCO Award | Sound Design – Rob Milburn | Won |
| 1999–2000 | Jitney | AUDELCO Award | Director/Dramatic Production – Marion McClinton | Won |
| 1999–2000 | Jitney | Drama Critics' Circle Award | Best American Play | Won |
| 1999–2000 | Jitney | Drama Desk Award | Best American Play | Won |
| 1999–2000 | Jitney | Drama Desk Award | Best Ensemble | Won |
| 1999–2000 | Jitney | Drama Desk Award | Outstanding Set Design – David Gallo | Won |
| 1999–2000 | Jitney | Drama Desk Award | Outstanding New Play – August Wilson | Nom |
| 1999–2000 | Jitney | Drama Desk Award | Outstanding Director – Marion McClinton | Nom |
| 1999–2000 | Jitney | NAACP Theatre Awards | Best Male Performer – Stephen Henderson | Nom |
| 1999–2000 | Jitney | OBIE Award | Distinguished Ensemble Performance | Won |
| 1999–2000 | Jitney | OBIE Award | Direction – Marion McClinton | Won |
| 1999–2000 | Jitney | OBIE Award | Sustained Excellence: Costume Design – Susan Hilferty | Won |
| 1999–2000 | Jitney | Callaway Award | Best Director – Marion McClinton | Nom |
| 1999–2000 | Jitney | Drama League Award | Distinguished Production of a Play | Nom |
| 1999–2000 | Jitney | Lucille Lortel Award | Outstanding Play | Nom |
| 1999–2000 | Jitney | Lucille Lortel Award | Outstanding Director – Marion McClinton | Nom |
| 1999–2000 | Jitney | Lucille Lortel Award | Outstanding Costume Design – Susan Hilferty | Nom |
| 1999–2000 | Jitney | Lucille Lortel Award | Outstanding Lighting Design – Donald Holder | Nom |
| 1999–2000 | Jitney | Lucille Lortel Award | Outstanding Sound Design – Robert Milburn | Nom |
| 1999–2000 | Jitney | Outer Critics Circle Award | Outstanding Off-Broadway Play | Nom |
| 1999–2000 | Jitney | Lucille Lortel Award | Outstanding Set Design – David Gallo | Won |
| 1999–2000 | Saturday Night | Drama Desk Award | Outstanding Lyrics – Stephen Sondheim | Won |
| 1999–2000 | Saturday Night | Drama Desk Award | Outstanding New Musical | Nom |
| 1999–2000 | Saturday Night | Drama Desk Award | Outstanding Featured Actor – Christopher Fitzgerald | Nom |
| 1999–2000 | Saturday Night | Drama Desk Award | Outstanding Music – Stephen Sondheim | Nom |
| 1999–2000 | Saturday Night | Drama Desk Award | Outstanding Orchestrations – Jonathan Tunick | Nom |
| 1999–2000 | The Waverly Gallery | Drama Desk Award | Outstanding Actress – Eileen Heckart | Won |
| 1999–2000 | The Waverly Gallery | Lucille Lortel Award | Outstanding Performance – Eileen Heckart | Won |
| 1999–2000 | The Waverly Gallery | Outer Critics Circle Award | Outstanding Actress – Eileen Heckart | Won |
| 1999–2000 | The Waverly Gallery | Outer Critics Circle Award | John Gassner Playwrighting Award – Kenneth Lonergan | Nom |
| 1999–2000 | The Waverly Gallery | OBIE Award | Performance – Eileen Heckart | Won |
| 1999–2000 | Crimes of the Heart | Lucille Lortel Award | Outstanding Revival | Nom |
| 2000–2001 | Tiny Alice | Lucille Lortel Award | Outstanding Revival of 2001 | Won |
| 2000–2001 | Tiny Alice | Drama Desk Award | Outstanding Revival of a Play | Nom |
| 2000–2001 | Tiny Alice | Drama League Award | Distinguished Production of a Revival | Nom |
| 2000–2001 | Tiny Alice | Lucille Lortel Award | Outstanding Set Design – John Arnone | Nom |
| 2000–2001 | Tiny Alice | Lucille Lortel Award | Outstanding Costume Design – Constance Hoffman | Nom |
| 2001–02 | Metamorphoses | Drama Desk Award | Outstanding Play | Won |
| 2001–02 | Metamorphoses | Drama Desk Award | Outstanding Director of a Play – Mary Zimmerman | Won |
| 2001–02 | Metamorphoses | Drama Desk Award | Outstanding Music in a Play – Willy Schwarz | Won |
| 2001–02 | Metamorphoses | Drama Desk Award | Outstanding Lighting Design – TJ Gerckens | Won |
| 2001–02 | Metamorphoses | Drama League Award | Distinguished Production of a Play | Won |
| 2001–02 | Metamorphoses | Henry Hewes Design Award | Best Lighting Design – TJ Gerckens | Won |
| 2001–02 | Metamorphoses | Henry Hewes Design Award | Best Scenic Design – Daniel Ostling | Nom |
| 2001–02 | Metamorphoses | Lucille Lortel Award | Outstanding Play | Won |
| 2001–02 | Metamorphoses | Lucille Lortel Award | Outstanding Director – Mary Zimmerman | Won |
| 2001–02 | Metamorphoses | Lucille Lortel Award | Outstanding Lighting Design – TJ Gerckens | Won |
| 2001–02 | Metamorphoses | Lucille Lortel Award | Outstanding Scenic Design – Daniel Ostling | Nom |
| 2001–02 | Metamorphoses | Lucille Lortel Award | Outstanding Costume Design – Mara Blumenfeld | Nom |
| 2001–02 | Metamorphoses | Lucille Lortel Award | Outstanding Sound Design – Andrew Pluess and Ben Sussman | Nom |
| 2001–02 | Metamorphoses | Outer Critics Circle Award | Outstanding Director of a Play – Mary Zimmerman | Won |
| 2001–02 | Metamorphoses | Outer Critics Circle Award | Outstanding Broadway Play | Nom |
| 2001–02 | Metamorphoses | Tony Award | Best Director of a Play – Mary Zimmerman | Won |
| 2001–02 | Metamorphoses | Tony Award | Best Play | Nom |
| 2001–02 | Metamorphoses | Tony Award | Best Scenic Design – Daniel Ostling | Nom |
| 2001–02 | Second Stage Theater | Lucille Lortel Award | Outstanding Body of Work | Won |
| 2001–02 | Sorrows and Rejoicings | AUDELCO Award | Best Supporting Actress – Charlayne Woodard | Won |
| 2002–03 | Crowns | AUDELCO Award | Outstanding Ensemble Performance | Won |
| 2002–03 | Crowns | AUDELCO Award | Musical Production of the Year | Won |
| 2002–03 | Crowns | AUDELCO Award | Outstanding Lighting Design – Robert Perry | Won |
| 2002–03 | Crowns | AUDELCO Award | Outstanding Costume Design – Emilio Sosa | Won |
| 2002–03 | Crowns | AUDELCO Award | Outstanding Director/Musical Production – Regina Taylor | Won |
| 2002–03 | Crowns | AUDELCO Award | Outstanding Choreographer – Ronald K. Brown | Won |
| 2002–03 | Crowns | AUDELCO Award | Outstanding Musical Director – Linda Twine | Won |
| 2002–03 | Crowns | Lucille Lortel Award | Outstanding Choreographer – Ronald K. Brown | Nom |
| 2002–03 | Ricky Jay: On the Stem | Drama Desk Award | Outstanding Solo Performance – Ricky Jay | Nom |
| 2003–04 | Living Out | Lucille Lortel Award | Outstanding Featured Actress – Liza Colón-Zayas | Nom |
| 2003–04 | Living Out | Lucille Lortel Award | Outstanding Featured Actress – Zilah Mendoza | Nom |
| 2003–04 | The Notebooks of Leonarda da Vinci | Drama Desk Award | Outstanding Scenic Design – Scott Bradley | Nom |
| 2003–04 | The Notebooks of Leonarda da Vinci | Lucille Lortel Award | Outstanding Scenic Design – Scott Bradley | Nom |
| 2004–05 | Birdie Blue | AUDELCO Award | Dramatic Production of the Year | Won |
| 2004–05 | Birdie Blue | AUDELCO Award | Lead Actress – S. Epatha Merkerson | Won |
| 2004–05 | Birdie Blue | AUDELCO Award | Lighting Design – Donald Holder | Won |
| 2004–05 | Birdie Blue | AUDELCO Award | Supporting Actor – Billy Porter | Won |
| 2004–05 | Birdie Blue | Drama League Award | Distinguished Performance – S. Epatha Merkerson | Nom |
| 2004–05 | Birdie Blue | Lucille Lortel Award | Outstanding Lead Actress – S. Epatha Merkerson | Nom |
| 2004–05 | Birdie Blue | OBIE Award | Outstanding Performance – S. Epatha Merkerson | Won |
| 2004–05 | Danny and the Deep Blue Sea | Drama League Award | Distinguished Performance – Adam Rothenberg | Nom |
| 2004–05 | Privilege | Theatre World Award | Conor Donovan | Won |
| 2004–05 | Privilege | Lucille Lortel Award | Outstanding Lead Actor – Conor Donovan | Nom |
| 2004–05 | Reckless | Drama League Award | Distinguished Revival of a Play | Nom |
| 2004–05 | Reckless | Drama League Award | Distinguished Performance – Mary-Louise Parker | Nom |
| 2004–05 | Reckless | Tony Award | Best Performance by a Leading Actress in a Play – Mary-Louise Parker | Nom |
| 2004–05 | The 25th Annual Putnam County Spelling Bee | Drama Desk Award | Outstanding Ensemble Performances | Won |
| 2004–05 | The 25th Annual Putnam County Spelling Bee | Drama Desk Award | Outstanding Book of a Musical – Rachel Sheinkin | Won |
| 2004–05 | The 25th Annual Putnam County Spelling Bee | Drama Desk Award | Outstanding Director of a Musical – James Lapine | Won |
| 2004–05 | The 25th Annual Putnam County Spelling Bee | Drama Desk Award | Outstanding Musical | Nom |
| 2004–05 | The 25th Annual Putnam County Spelling Bee | Drama Desk Award | Outstanding Music – William Finn | Nom |
| 2004–05 | The 25th Annual Putnam County Spelling Bee | Drama Desk Award | Outstanding Lyrics – William Finn | Nom |
| 2004–05 | The 25th Annual Putnam County Spelling Bee | Drama League Award | Outstanding Production of a Musical | Nom |
| 2004–05 | The 25th Annual Putnam County Spelling Bee | Drama League Award | Distinguished Performance – Jesse Tyler Ferguson | Nom |
| 2004–05 | The 25th Annual Putnam County Spelling Bee | Drama League Award | Distinguished Performance – Dan Fogler | Nom |
| 2004–05 | The 25th Annual Putnam County Spelling Bee | Lucille Lortel Award | Outstanding Musical | Won |
| 2004–05 | The 25th Annual Putnam County Spelling Bee | Lucille Lortel Award | Outstanding Featured Actor – Dan Fogler | Won |
| 2004–05 | The 25th Annual Putnam County Spelling Bee | Lucille Lortel Award | Outstanding Choreographer – Dan Knechtges | Nom |
| 2004–05 | The 25th Annual Putnam County Spelling Bee | Lucille Lortel Award | Outstanding Director – James Lapine | Nom |
| 2004–05 | The 25th Annual Putnam County Spelling Bee | Outer Critics Circle Award | Outstanding Featured Actor – Dan Fogler | Nom |
| 2004–05 | The 25th Annual Putnam County Spelling Bee | Theatre World Award | Dan Fogler | Won |
| 2004–05 | The 25th Annual Putnam County Spelling Bee | Lucille Lortel Award | Celia Keenan-Bogler | Won |
| 2004–05 | The 25th Annual Putnam County Spelling Bee | Tony Award | Best Book of a Musical – Rachel Sheinkin | Won |
| 2004–05 | The 25th Annual Putnam County Spelling Bee | Tony Award | Best Performance of a Featured Actor in a Musical – Dan Fogler | Won |
| 2004–05 | The 25th Annual Putnam County Spelling Bee | Tony Award | Best Musical | Nom |
| 2004–05 | The 25th Annual Putnam County Spelling Bee | Tony Award | Best Performance of a Featured Actor in a Musical – Celia Keenan-Bogler | Nom |
| 2004–05 | The 25th Annual Putnam County Spelling Bee | Tony Award | Best Direction of a Musical – James Lapine | Nom |
| 2004–05 | The 25th Annual Putnam County Spelling Bee | Tony Award | Best Original Score Written for the Theatre – Williams Finn | Nom |
| 2005–06 | A Soldier's Play | Drama League Award | Distinguished Revival of a Play | Nom |
| 2005–06 | A Soldier's Play | Drama League Award | Distinguished Performance – Taye Diggs | Nom |
| 2005–06 | A Soldier's Play | Drama League Award | Distinguished Performance – Anthony Mackie | Nom |
| 2005–06 | Show People | Drama League Award | Distinguished Performance – Debra Monk | Nom |
| 2005–06 | Swimming in the Shallows | Lucille Lortel Award | Outstanding Scenic Design – David Korins | Nom |
| 2005–06 | The Little Dog Laughed | Drama Desk Award | Outstanding Actress in a Play – Julie White | Nom |
| 2005–06 | The Little Dog Laughed | GLAAD | Outstanding New York Theater: Broadway & Off-Broadway | Won |
| 2005–06 | The Little Dog Laughed | Lucille Lortel Award | Outstanding Lead Actress – Julie White | Nom |
| 2005–06 | The Little Dog Laughed | Lucille Lortel Award | Outstanding Director – Scott Ellis | Nom |
| 2005–06 | The Little Dog Laughed | OBIE Award | Outstanding Performance – Julie White | Won |
| 2005–06 | The Little Dog Laughed | Outer Critics Circle Award | Outstanding Actress in a Play – Julie White | Nom |
| 2005–06 | The Little Dog Laughed | Theatre World Award | Johnny Galecki | Won |
| 2005–06 | The Little Dog Laughed | Tony Award | Best Performance By a Leading Actress in a Play – Julie White | Won |
| 2005–06 | The Little Dog Laughed | Tony Award | Best Play | Nom |
| 2005–06 | The Water's Edge | Drama League Award | Distinguished Performance – Kate Burton | Nom |
| 2005–06 | The Water's Edge | Lucille Lortel Award | Outstanding Featured Actress – Mamie Gummer | Nom |
| 2006–07 | Some Men | Drama Desk Award | Outstanding Play | Nom |
| 2006–07 | Some Men | Drama Desk Award | Outstanding Featured Actor in a Play – Frederick Weller | Nom |
| 2006–07 | Some Men | Drama League Award | Distinguished Performance – David Greenspan | Nom |
| 2006–07 | Some Men | Lucille Lortel Award | Outstanding Featured Actor – David Greenspan | Nom |
| 2006–07 | Some Men | Lucille Lortel Award | Outstanding Lighting Design – Kevin Adams | Nom |
| 2006–07 | Some Men | OBIE Award | Outstanding Performance – David Greenspan | Won |
| 2006–07 | Some Men | Outer Critics Circle Award | Outstanding Featured Actor in a Play – David Greenspan | Nom |
| 2006–07 | The Scene | Drama League Award | Distinguished Production of a Play | Nom |
| 2006–07 | The Scene | Lucille Lortel Award | Outstanding Featured Actress – Anna Camp | Nom |
| 2006–07 | The Scene | Lucille Lortel Award | Outstanding Lead Actress – Patricia Heaton | Nom |
| 2006–07 | The Scene | Outer Critics Circle Award | Outstanding New Off-Broadway Play | Nom |
| 2007–08 | Election Day | Lucille Lortel Award | Outstanding Featured Actor – Lorenzo Pisoni | Nom |
| 2007–08 | Eurydice | Drama Desk Award | Outstanding Set Design of a Play – Scott Bradley | Nom |
| 2007–08 | Eurydice | Drama League Award | Distinguished Production of a Play | Nom |
| 2007–08 | Eurydice | Lucille Lortel Award | Outstanding Scenic Design – Scott Bradley | Nom |
| 2007–08 | Eurydice | Lucille Lortel Award | Outstanding Lighting Design – Russel H. Champa | Nom |
| 2007–08 | Next to Normal | Drama Desk Award | Outstanding Actress in a Musical – Alice Ripley | Nom |
| 2007–08 | Next to Normal | Drama Desk Award | Outstanding Music – Tom Kitt | Nom |
| 2007–08 | Next to Normal | Drama League Award | Distinguished Production of a Musical | Nom |
| 2007–08 | Next to Normal | Drama League Award | Distinguished Performance – Brian d'Arcy James | Nom |
| 2007–08 | Next to Normal | Lucille Lortel Award | Outstanding Musical | Nom |
| 2007–08 | Next to Normal | Lucille Lortel Award | Outstanding Featured Actor – Aaron Tveit | Nom |
| 2007–08 | Next to Normal | Lucille Lortel Award | Outstanding Lighting Design – Kevin Adams | Nom |
| 2007–08 | Next to Normal | Outer Critics Circle Award | Outstanding New Score | Won |
| 2007–08 | Next to Normal | Outer Critics Circle Award | Outstanding New Off-Broadway Musical | Nom |
| 2007–08 | Next to Normal | Outer Critics Circle Award | Outstanding Actress in a Musical – Alice Ripley | Nom |
| 2007–08 | Next to Normal | Helen Hayes Award | Outstanding Lead Actress, Non-Resident Production – Alice Ripley | Won |
| 2007–08 | Next to Normal | Helen Hayes Award | Outstanding Supporting Performer, Non-Resident Production – Aaron Tveit | Won |
| 2007–08 | Next to Normal | Helen Hayes Award | Outstanding Non-Resident Production | Won |
| 2007–08 | Next to Normal | Helen Hayes Award | Outstanding Lead Actor, Non-Resident Production – J. Robert Spencer | Nom |
| 2007–08 | Next to Normal | Helen Hayes Award | Outstanding Supporting Performer, Non-Resident Production – Jennifer Damiano | Nom |
| 2007–08 | Next to Normal | Tony Award | Best Orchestrations – Michael Starobin & Tom Kitt | Won |
| 2007–08 | Next to Normal | Tony Award | Best Original Score Written for the Theatre – Tom Kitt & Brian Yorkey | Won |
| 2007–08 | Next to Normal | Tony Award | Best Performance by a Leading Actress in a Musical – Alice Ripley | Won |
| 2007–08 | Next to Normal | Tony Award | Best Musical | Nom |
| 2007–08 | Next to Normal | Tony Award | Best Book of a Musical – Brian Yorkey | Nom |
| 2007–08 | Next to Normal | Tony Award | Best Performance by a Leading Actor in a Musical – J. Robert Spencer | Nom |
| 2007–08 | Next to Normal | Tony Award | Best Performance by a Featured Actress in a Musical – Jennifer Damiano | Nom |
| 2007–08 | Next to Normal | Tony Award | Best Direction of a Musical – Michael Greif | Nom |
| 2007–08 | Next to Normal | Tony Award | Best Scenic Design of a Musical – Mark Wendland | Nom |
| 2007–08 | Next to Normal | Tony Award | Best Lighting Design of a Musical – Kevin Adams | Nom |
| 2007–08 | Next to Normal | Tony Award | Best Sound Design of a Musical – Brian Ronan | Nom |
| 2007–08 | Next to Normal | Pulitzer Prize Winner | Drama – Tom Kitt & Brian Yorkey | Won |
| 2007–08 | Edward Albee's Peter and Jerry | Drama Desk Award | Outstanding Actor in a Play – Bill Pullman | Nom |
| 2007–08 | Edward Albee's Peter and Jerry | Drama Desk Award | Outstanding Featured Actress in a Play – Johanna Day | Nom |
| 2007–08 | Edward Albee's Peter and Jerry | Lucille Lortel Award | Distinguished Performance – Bill Pullman | Nom |
| 2007–08 | Edward Albee's Peter and Jerry | Lucille Lortel Award | Distinguished Performance – Dallas Roberts | Nom |
| 2008–09 | Animals out of Paper | Lucille Lortel Award | Outstanding Play | Nom |
| 2008–09 | Animals out of Paper | Lucille Lortel Award | Outstanding Featured Actor – Utkarsh Ambudkar | Nom |
| 2008–09 | Animals out of Paper | Lucille Lortel Award | Outstanding Scenic Design – Beowulf Boritt | Nom |
| 2008–09 | Becky Shaw | Drama Desk Award | Outstanding Play | Nom |
| 2008–09 | Becky Shaw | Lucille Lortel Award | Outstanding Play | Nom |
| 2008–09 | Becky Shaw | Lucille Lortel Award | Outstanding Lead Actress – Annie Parisse | Nom |
| 2008–09 | Becky Shaw | Outer Critics Circle Award | Outstanding New Off-Broadway Play | Nom |
| 2008–09 | Becky Shaw | Outer Critics Circle Award | John Gassner Award for a New American Play – Gina Gionfriddo | Nom |
| 2008–09 | Becky Shaw | Pulitzer Prize Finalist | Drama | Nom |
| 2009–10 | Everyday Rapture | Drama Desk Award | Outstanding Musical | Nom |
| 2009–10 | Everyday Rapture | Drama Desk Award | Outstanding Book of a Musical – Dick Scanlan & Sherie Rene Scott | Nom |
| 2009–10 | Everyday Rapture | Drama Desk Award | Outstanding Orchestration – Tom Kitt | Nom |
| 2009–10 | Everyday Rapture | Drama Desk Award | Outstanding Sound Design of a Musical – Ashley Hanson, Kurt Eric Fischer, Brian Ronan | Nom |
| 2009–10 | Everyday Rapture | Lucille Lortel Award | Outstanding Musical | Nom |
| 2009–10 | Everyday Rapture | Lucille Lortel Award | Outstanding Lead Actress – Sherie Rene Scott | Nom |
| 2009–10 | Everyday Rapture | Tony Award | Best Performance by a Leading Actress in a Musical – Sherie Rene Scott | Nom |
| 2009–10 | Everyday Rapture | Tony Award | Best Book of a Musical – Dick Scanlan & Sherie Rene Scott | Nom |
| 2009–10 | Let Me Down Easy | Lucille Lortel Award | Outstanding Solo Show | Nom |
| 2010–11 | All New People | Drama Desk Award | Outstanding Featured Actress in a Play – Anna Camp | Nom |
| 2010–11 | Bachelorette | Lucille Lortel Award | Outstanding Lead Actress – Tracee Chimo | Nom |
| 2010–11 | By the Way, Meet Vera Stark | AUDELCO Award | Lead Actress – Sanaa Lathan | Won |
| 2010–11 | By the Way, Meet Vera Stark | AUDELCO Award | Lighting Design – Jeff Croiter | Nom |
| 2010–11 | By the Way, Meet Vera Stark | AUDELCO Award | Set Design – Neil Patel | Nom |
| 2010–11 | By the Way, Meet Vera Stark | AUDELCO Award | Costume Design – ESosa | Nom |
| 2010–11 | By the Way, Meet Vera Stark | AUDELCO Award | Sound Design – John Gromoda | Nom |
| 2010–11 | By the Way, Meet Vera Stark | AUDELCO Award | Director/Dramatic Production – Jo Bonney | Nom |
| 2010–11 | By the Way, Meet Vera Stark | AUDELCO Award | Playwright – Lynn Nottage | Nom |
| 2010–11 | By the Way, Meet Vera Stark | AUDELCO Award | Supporting Actor – Daniel Breaker | Nom |
| 2010–11 | By the Way, Meet Vera Stark | AUDELCO Award | Supporting Actress – Kimberly Hebert Gregory | Nom |
| 2010–11 | By the Way, Meet Vera Stark | AUDELCO Award | Dramatic Production of the Year | Nom |
| 2010–11 | By the Way, Meet Vera Stark | Drama Desk Award | Outstanding Play – Lynn Nottage | Nom |
| 2010–11 | By the Way, Meet Vera Stark | Drama Desk Award | Outstanding Actress – Sanaa Lathan | Nom |
| 2010–11 | By the Way, Meet Vera Stark | Drama Desk Award | Outstanding Featured Actress in a Play – Stephanie J. Block | Nom |
| 2010–11 | By the Way, Meet Vera Stark | Drama Desk Award | Outstanding Featured Actress in a Play – Kimberly Hebert Gregory | Nom |
| 2010–11 | By the Way, Meet Vera Stark | Drama Desk Award | Outstanding Directory of a Play – Jo Bonney | Nom |
| 2010–11 | By the Way, Meet Vera Stark | Drama Desk Award | Outstanding Costume Design – ESosa | Nom |
| 2010–11 | By the Way, Meet Vera Stark | Lucille Lortel Award | Outstanding Lead Actress – Sanaa Lathan | Won |
| 2010–11 | By the Way, Meet Vera Stark | Lucille Lortel Award | Outstanding Costume Design – ESosa | Won |
| 2010–11 | By the Way, Meet Vera Stark | Lucille Lortel Award | Outstanding Director – Jo Bonney | Nom |
| 2010–11 | By the Way, Meet Vera Stark | Lucille Lortel Award | Outstanding Featured Actress – Kimberly Hebert Gregory | Nom |
| 2010–11 | The Elaborate Entrance of Chad Deity | Pulitzer Prize Finalist | Drama – Kristoffer Diaz | Nom |
| 2010–11 | The Elaborate Entrance of Chad Deity | Drama League Award | Distinguished Production of a Play | Nom |
| 2010–11 | The Elaborate Entrance of Chad Deity | Drama League Award | Distinguished Performance – Desmin Borges | Nom |
| 2010–11 | The Elaborate Entrance of Chad Deity | Lucille Lortel Award | Outstanding Play | Won |
| 2010–11 | The Elaborate Entrance of Chad Deity | Lucille Lortel Award | Outstanding Sound Design – Mikhail Fiksel | Won |
| 2010–11 | The Elaborate Entrance of Chad Deity | Lucille Lortel Award | Outstanding Lead Actor – Desmin Borges | Nom |
| 2010–11 | The Elaborate Entrance of Chad Deity | Lucille Lortel Award | Outstanding Lighting Design – Jesse Klug | Nom |
| 2010–11 | The Elaborate Entrance of Chad Deity | OBIE Award | Best New American Play | Won |
| 2010–11 | The Elaborate Entrance of Chad Deity | Theatre World Award | Outstanding Off-Broadway Debut Performance During 2010–11 Theatrical Season – Desimin Borges | Won |
| 2010–11 | Wings | Drama Desk Award | Outstanding Sound Design of a Play – Bray Poor | Nom |
| 2011–12 | The Blue Flower | Lucille Lortel Award | Outstanding Musical | Nom |
| 2011–12 | The Blue Flower | Lucille Lortel Award | Outstanding Choreographer – Chase Brock | Nom |
| 2011–12 | How I Learned to Drive | Drama League Award | Distinguished Revival of a Play | Nom |
| 2011–12 | How I Learned to Drive | Drama League Award | Distinguished Performance – Norbert Leo Butz | Nom |
| 2015–16 | Dear Evan Hansen | Lucille Lortel Award | Outstanding Musical | Nom |
| 2015–16 | Dear Evan Hansen | Lucille Lortel Award | Outstanding Lead Actor in a Musical – Ben Platt | Won |
| 2015–16 | Dear Evan Hansen | Lucille Lortel Award | Outstanding Featured Actress in a Musical – Rachel Bay Jones | Won |
| 2015–16 | Dear Evan Hansen | Lucille Lortel Award | Outstanding Projection Design – Peter Nigrini | Nom |
| 2015–16 | Dear Evan Hansen | Tony Award | Best Musical | Won |
| 2015–16 | Dear Evan Hansen | Tony Award | Best Book of a Musical – Steven Levenson | Won |
| 2015–16 | Dear Evan Hansen | Tony Award | Best Original Score – Pasek & Paul | Won |
| 2015–16 | Dear Evan Hansen | Tony Award | Best Performance by a Leading Actor in a Musical – Ben Platt | Won |
| 2015–16 | Dear Evan Hansen | Tony Award | Best Performance by an Actor in a Featured Role in a Musical – Mike Faist | Nom |
| 2015–16 | Dear Evan Hansen | Tony Award | Best Performance by an Actress in a Featured Role in a Musical – Rachel Bay Jones | Won |
| 2015–16 | Dear Evan Hansen | Tony Award | Best Lighting Design of a Musical – Japhy Weideman | Nom |
| 2015–16 | Dear Evan Hansen | Tony Award | Best Direction of a Musical – Michael Greif | Nom |
| 2021–22 | Take Me Out | Tony Award | Best Revival of a Play | Won |
| 2021–22 | Take Me Out | Tony Award | Best Featured Actor in a Play, Jesse Tyler Ferguson | Won |
| 2023–24 | Appropriate | Tony Award | Best Revival of a Play | Won |
| 2023–24 | Appropriate | Tony Award | Best Leading Actress in a Play, Sarah Paulson | Won |
| 2023–24 | Appropriate | Tony Award | Best Lighting Design of a Play, Jane Cox | Won |
| 2023–24 | Appropriate | Tony Award | Best Direction of a Play, Lila Neugebauer | Nom |
| 2023–24 | Appropriate | Tony Award | Best Featured Actor in a Play, Corey Stoll | Nom |
| 2023–24 | Appropriate | Tony Award | Best Costume Design of a Play, Dede Ayite | Nom |
| 2023–24 | Appropriate | Tony Award | Best Sound Design of a Play, Bray Poor and Will Pickens | Nom |
| 2023–24 | Appropriate | Tony Award | Best Scenic Design of a Play, dots | Nom |
| 2023–24 | Mother Play | Tony Award | Best Play, Paula Vogel | Nom |
| 2023–24 | Mother Play | Tony Award | Best Leading Actress in a Play, Jessica Lange | Nom |
| 2023–24 | Mother Play | Tony Award | Best Featured Actress in a Play, Celia Keenan-Bolger | Nom |
| 2023–24 | Mother Play | Tony Award | Best Featured Actor in a Play, Jim Parsons | Nom |
