= Crystal Dickinson =

American actress

- Born: Belleville, New Jersey, U.S.
- Education: Seton Hall University
- Occupation: Actress

Crystal Dickinson is an American actress. She made her Broadway debut in the play Clybourne Park written by Bruce Norris and directed by Pam MacKinnon.

== Early life and education ==
Dickinson was born in Belleville, New Jersey, and grew up in Irvington, New Jersey. she graduated from Miss Porter's School. She then graduated from Seton Hall University in 1998 in the College of Communication and the Arts. She also received an Master of Fine Arts in theater/acting from the University of Illinois Urbana-Champaign and studied at the London Academy of Music and Dramatic Art.

== Career ==
Dickinson is best known for her role on the Showtime series The CHI as Detective Toussaint. She has also appeared in other TV series such as New Amsterdam, Feed the Beast, House of Payne and The Good Wife and the films I Origins and This Is Where I Leave You.

She made her Broadway debut in Clybourne Park (2012) and returned to Broadway in You Can't Take It With You (2014).

A recipient of Theatre World Award in 2012 for Clybourne Park, she has also won a Jenny Award for Best Actress. She was nominated for the AUDELCO in 2009, 2010, 2011 and 2013.

In 2024, Dickinson starred in August Wilson's Gem of the Ocean at Two River Theater in Red Bank, New Jersey.

== Personal life ==
Dickinson is married to actor Brandon J. Dirden.

== Filmography ==
=== Television ===
Year	Title	Role	Notes
2008	House of Payne	Melissa	2 episodes
2015	The Good Wife	Josie Tatro	1 episode
2016	Feed the Beast	Doctor	2 episodes
2016	High Maintenance	Lawyer	1 episode
2019–2026	The Chi	Detective Alice Toussaint	19 episodes
2019	New Amsterdam	Tessa Martone	1 episode
2020	For Life	Georgia Bishop	2 episodes
2020–2021	The Accidental Wolf		2 episodes

=== Film ===
Year	Title	Role	Notes
2014	I Origins	Julie Dairy	
2014	This Is Where I Leave You	Intern	
2016	Collateral Beauty		
2016	Distortion: A Social Media Story		

=== Theatre ===
Year	Title	Role	Notes
2008	The First Breeze of Summer	Hope	Signature Theatre Company, Off-Broadway
2009	Broke-ology	Sonia King	Lincoln Center, Off-Broadway
2010	Bottom of the World	Abby	Atlantic Theater Company, Off-Broadway
2011	Born Bad	Sister #2	Soho Repertory Theatre, Off-Broadway
2012	Clybourne Park	Francine/Lena	Walter Kerr Theatre, Broadway
2013	The Call	Drea	Playwrights Horizons, Off-Broadway
2013	As You Like It	Celia	Houston Shakespeare Festival
2013	All The Way	Coretta Hamer	American Repertory Theatre
2014	You Can't Take It With You	Rheba	Longacre Theatre, Broadway
2015	Seven Guitars	Louise	Two River Theater
2016	Signature Plays	Sarah	Pershing Square Signature Center, Off-Broadway
2017	A Raisin in the Sun	Ruth Younger	Two River Theater
2018	The Low Road	Old Tizzy/Mary Cleere/Ntombi	The Public Theater, Off-Broadway
2021	Cullud Wattah	Marion	The Public Theater, Off-Broadway
2022	Lessons in Survival: 1971	Nikki Giovanni	Vineyard Theatre, Off-Broadway
2022	Wine in the Wilderness	Tommy	Two River Theater
2023	The Trees	Sheila	Playwrights Horizons, Off-Broadway
2023	Covenant	Mama	Roundabout Theatre Company, Off-Broadway
2024	Gem of the Ocean	Black Mary	Two River Theater
2024	The White Chip	The Women	MCC Theater, Off-Broadway
2024	The Blood Quilt	Clementine	Lincoln Center, Off-Broadway
