= ABCT =

ABCT may refer to:

- Anthony Bean Community Theater
- Armored brigade combat team, a formation of the U.S. Army
- Association for Behavioral and Cognitive Therapies
- Austrian Business Cycle Theory
- Airfields of Britain Conservation Trust
- ATP-binding cassette transporter
