= Strange Pleasure =

1994 studio album by Jimmie Vaughan

Studio album by Jimmie Vaughan
- Released: 1994
- Genres: Blues, rock
- Label: Epic
- Producers: Nile Rodgers, Jimmie Vaughan

Jimmie Vaughan chronology
Strange Pleasure (1994)	Out There (1998)

Strange Pleasure is the first solo album by the American musician Jimmie Vaughan, released in 1994. It is dedicated to Stevie Ray Vaughan and Albert Collins. Vaughan supported the album with a North American tour, including shows with C. C. Adcock.

The album peaked at No. 127 on the Billboard 200. It was nominated for a Grammy Award for "Best Contemporary Blues Album".

== Production ==
Recorded partly at Ardent Studios, Strange Pleasure was produced primarily by Nile Rodgers. Vaughan wrote or cowrote all of the album's songs; Dr. John cowrote two, and also played on the title track. Vaughan did not use a bass player, instead having the organ handle the low end; when he returned to music after Stevie Ray's death, Vaughan wanted to move the foundation of his sound from the electric guitar to a Hammond. Many songs contain three-part backing vocals.

Lou Ann Barton sang on the album. "Six Strings Down", cowritten with the Neville Brothers, is a tribute to Vaughan's brother. Vaughan, with "Six Strings Down" selected, chose to fill the rest of the album with upbeat, unserious songs. "Tilt a Whirl" is an instrumental.

== Critical reception ==
Professional ratings
Review scores
Source	Rating
AllMusic	4.5/5 stars
Chicago Tribune	3/4 stars
The Encyclopedia of Popular Music	3/5 stars
The Indianapolis Star	2.5/4 stars
MusicHound Blues: The Essential Album Guide	4/5 stars
The Penguin Guide to Blues Recordings	3/4 stars
Record Collector	4/5 stars
USA Today	3.5/4 stars
Windsor Star	B+

The St. Petersburg Times called the album "a winning set of finely crafted tunes that insinuate rather than dazzle." The Windsor Star wrote that Vaughan "treats his playing as if he were singing, always leaving room to breathe, letting his few notes speak volumes, with their thick textures, gentle tweaks at perfect moments and his great grooves." The Indianapolis Star concluded that "the songs are lined up as if producer Nile Rodgers acknowledges that Jimmie Vaughan is best when his rhythms are earthier and his lyrics are co-written by songwriting veterans."

The Sun-Sentinel noted that "infectious shuffles, greasy late-night rockers and soaring gospel tunes pepper the album like cigarette butts on a honky-tonk floor." USA Today stated that the songs "range from honky-tonk to gospel mixed with soul, blues and rock, spiced by scrumptious backup singers and an organ sound like Booker T. and the MG's' on 'Green Onions'." The Chicago Tribune determined that "the biggest surprise is that Vaughan ... acquits himself more than adequately on lead vocals."

The Austin Chronicle deemed Strange Pleasure the best Texas album of 1994. Record Collector praised the "effortless groove that waves a worn plectrum in the direction of old masters such as Big Bill Broonzy and John Lee Hooker, while keepin a close watch on the sleeker rock shapes of 70s-era Rolling Stones."

== Track listing ==
All tracks are written, or co-written, by Jimmie Vaughan; additional writers noted

No.	Title	Writer(s)	Length
1.	"Boom-Bapa-Boom"		3:56
2.	"Don't Cha Know"		4:20
3.	"Hey-Yeah"	Paul Ray	3:43
4.	"Flamenco Dancer"	Ray	4:18
5.	"(Everybody's Got) Sweet Soul Vibe"	Nile Rodgers	4:33
6.	"Tilt a Whirl"		4:56
7.	"Six Strings Down"	Eric Kolb; Aaron Neville; Charmaine Neville; Cyril Neville; Kelsey Smith	4:25
8.	"Just Like Putty"	Ray	4:07
9.	"Two Wings"	Dr. John	4:25
10.	"Love the World"	Dr. John	4:14
11.	"Strange Pleasure (Modern Backporch Duende)"		2:29
