= Anthony Bean Community Theater =

Anthony Bean Community Theater and Acting School
- Founded: 2000
- Founder: Anthony Bean
- Type: Community theatre, Acting school
- Location: 4527 Tchoupitoulas Street, New Orleans, Louisiana 70115
- Artistic director: Anthony Bean
- Website: Official website

The Anthony Bean Community Theater and Acting School (ABCT) is a nonprofit community theatre and performing arts school based in New Orleans, Louisiana. Founded in 2000 by actor and director Anthony Bean, the organization produces works highlighting African-American experiences and runs an acting school for youth and adults. ABCT runs educational programs that train emerging artists. They stage classical and original plays that reflect New Orleans culture. In 2018, it received the August Wilson American Century Cycle Award from the Pittsburgh Post-Gazette and the August Wilson House / Daisy Wilson Artist Community, recognizing completion of Wilson's ten-play cycle.

== History ==
ABCT was founded in 2000 to serve as a dedicated space for African American artists and audiences in New Orleans.

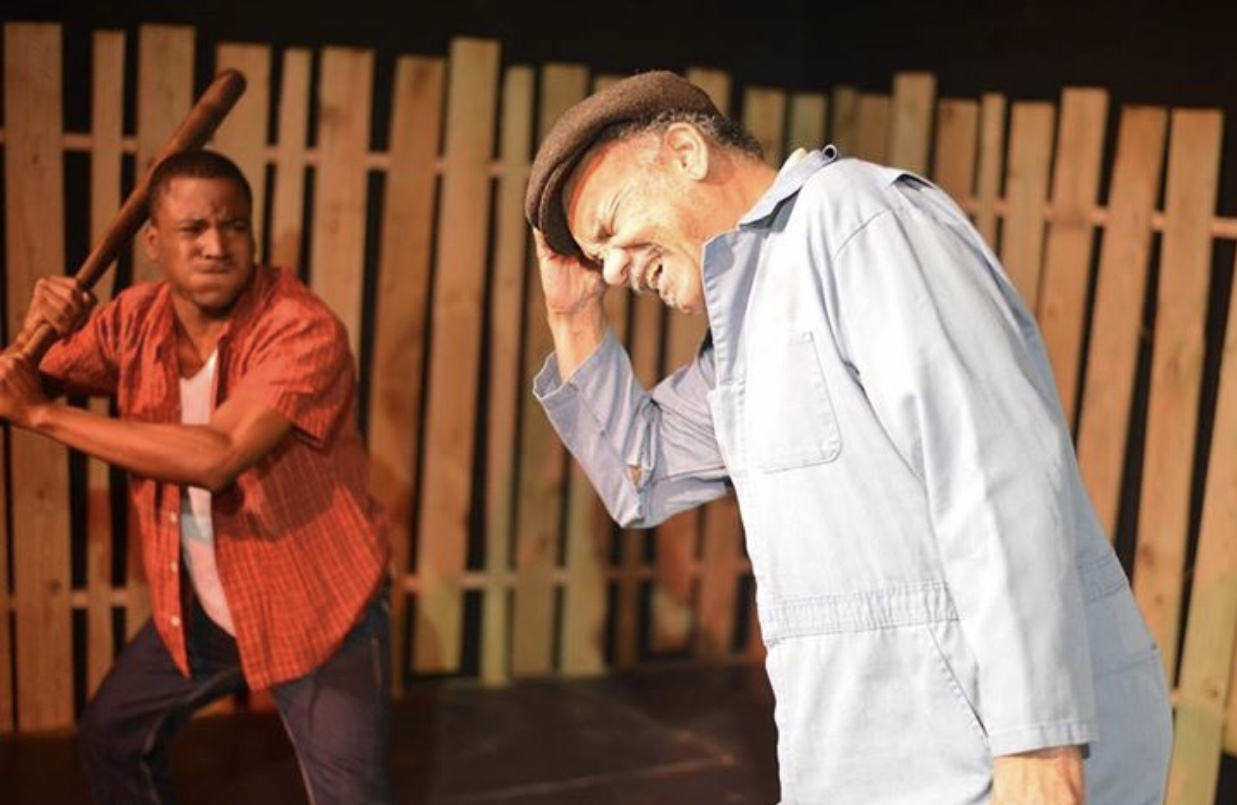

The company's first production was Steal Away. Since then, ABCT has produced a diverse repertoire including A Raisin in the Sun, The Wiz, Fences, and CATS, along with original works like Reflections: The Oliver Thomas Story.

Following Hurricane Katrina in 2005, ABCT continued its operations and provided arts programming for local youth, even as many institutions closed. The theatre became a creative anchor for the city's cultural recovery, staging stories focused on resilience, community, and rebuilding.

ABCT later moved its operations to 4527 Tchoupitoulas Street in New Orleans, where it continues to serve as both a performance venue and a teaching facility.

== Programs and Outreach ==
The organization functions as both a producing theater and an educational institution. Its acting school provides instruction in acting, stagecraft, voice, and theater management for both adults and children.

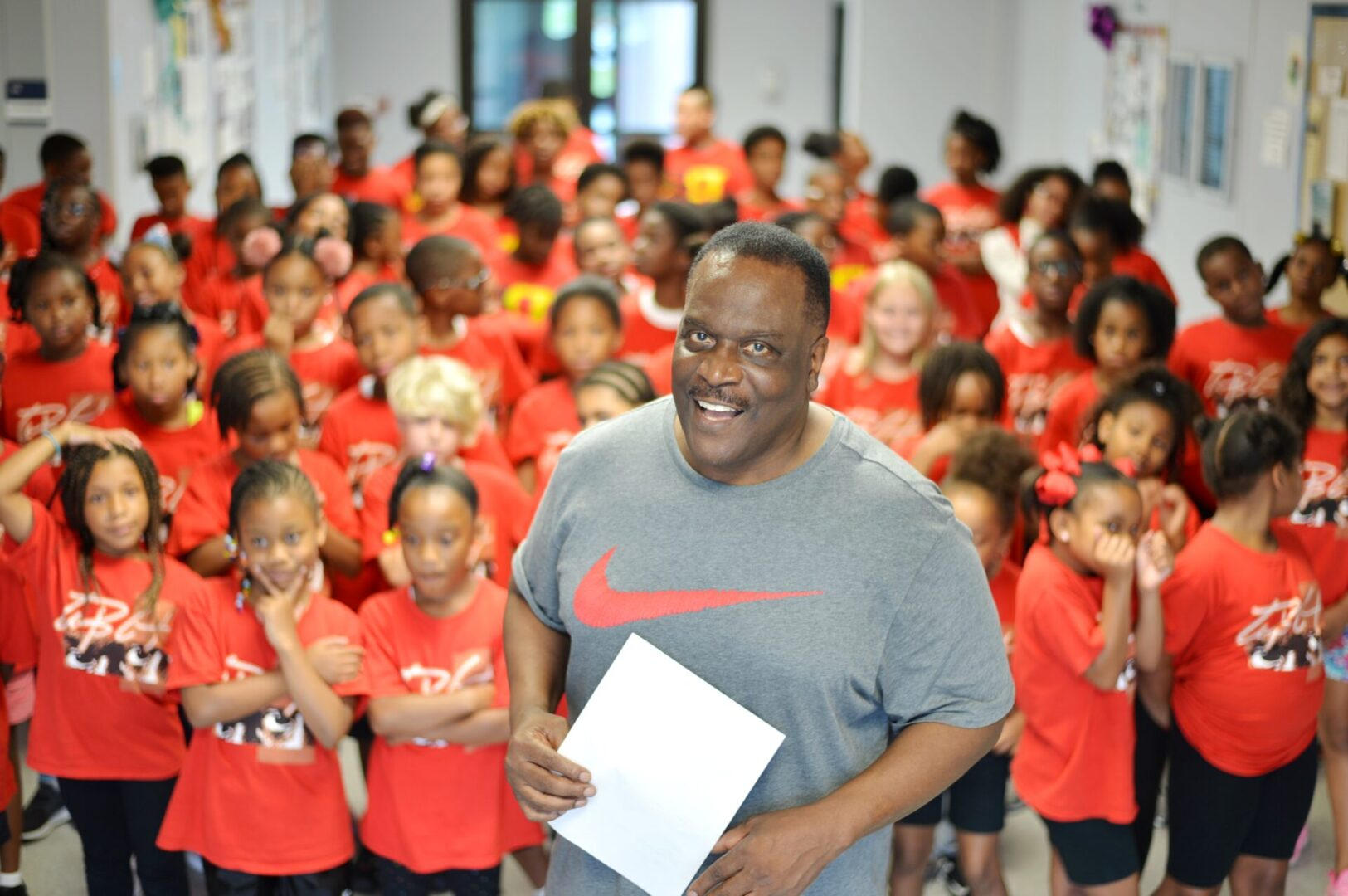

ABCT offers summer youth intensives—often in collaboration with the New Orleans Recreation Department Commission—for students aged 7–17, ending with public performances.

The theatre also produces youth-driven media, such as ABCT Teen Talk TV, a talk-show format featuring teenagers discussing social issues, civic engagement, and personal growth.

== Acting School and Training Impact ==
The acting school is considered a crucial entry point for rising Black performers in Louisiana's "Hollywood South" film and TV scene. ABCT alums have worked in theater, movies, and television, attributing their success to the school's focus on professional discipline and ensemble acting.

Through its programs, ABCT builds confidence, teamwork, and leadership among inner-city youth, using theatre as a tool for empowerment and cultural education.

== Productions ==
ABCT's productions combine classic works with locally inspired storytelling. The company has staged A Raisin in the Sun, Fences, High School Musical, and other community-based productions.

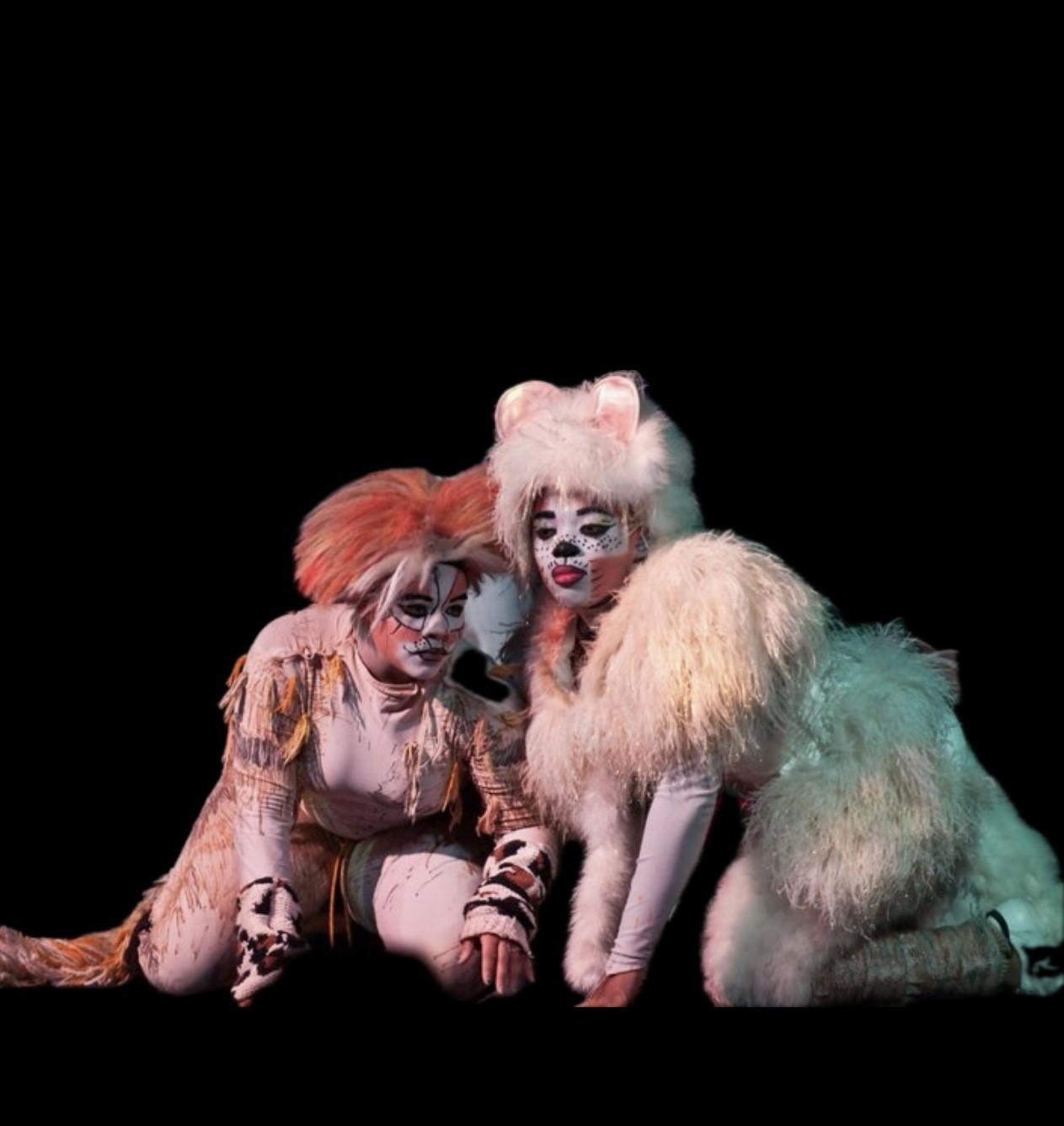

In 2025, ABCT premiered 504: The Hip-Hop Musical at the Orpheum Theater, featuring more than 75 young performers. The show highlighted the experiences of New Orleans teens during and after Hurricane Katrina, blending hip-hop, bounce, and spoken word with scenes depicting the city's recovery.

== Recognition ==
In December 2018, ABCT received the August Wilson American Century Cycle Award from the Pittsburgh Post-Gazette and the August Wilson House / Daisy Wilson Artist Community. The award honors theaters that have completed full productions of the ten-play American Century Cycle by August Wilson. ABCT is among the few theaters nationwide to reach this milestone.

Founder Anthony Bean has been recognized for over fifty years of work in Black theatre and arts education. Before launching ABCT, he co-founded the Ethiopian Theatre Company in the 1970s, one of New Orleans' earliest Black theatre collectives. He has received honors from Southern University at New Orleans and local arts and community organizations for his commitment to mentorship and cultural preservation.

== Nonprofit Status ==
ABCT is registered as a 501(c)(3) nonprofit arts and education organization. Its mission is to mentor inner-city youth through theatre training and to offer people of color of all ages opportunities to study and perform.
