= Charmaine Neville =

American singer

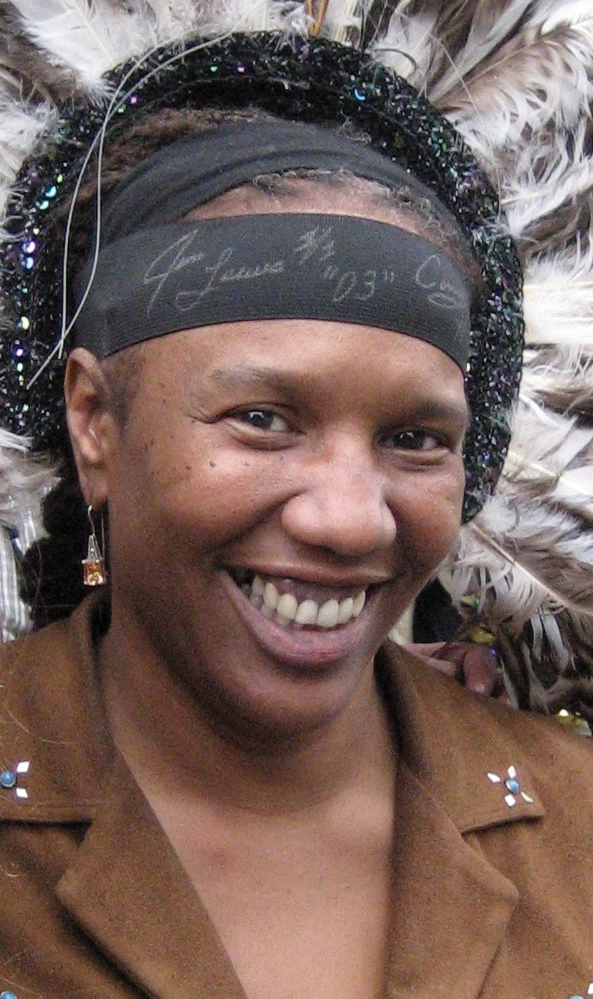
- Neville on Mardi Gras Day 2007

Background information
- Born: Charmaine Neville; March 31, 1956 (age 70)
- Origin: United States
- Genres: Jazz, funk
- Occupation: Singer
- Instrument: Vocals

Charmaine Neville (born March 31, 1956) is a New Orleans-based jazz singer.

== Biography ==
Raised Catholic, she is the daughter of Charles Neville of The Neville Brothers.

She is the lead singer of the Charmaine Neville Band, a jazz and funk band based in New Orleans. Other musicians in the Charmaine Neville Band include Amasa Miller, Detroit Brooks, Gerald French and Jesse Boyd.

Neville was in the news due to the aftermath of Hurricane Katrina, when the failure of the Federal levees swamped the city of New Orleans. Media reported her tale of witnessing cannibalism, alligator attacks, rape and eventual escape via a commandeered transit bus.

== Solo albums ==
- (1992) It's About Time
- (1992) All the Way Live at Snug Harbor
- (1996) Up Up Up
- (1996) Live at Bourbon Street Music Club (a.k.a. Live in Brazil)
- (1998) Queen of the Mardi Gras
- (2007) Jazz Fest Live 2007

== Album contributions ==
- (1981) The Neville Brothers "Fiyo On The Bayou"
- (1988) "New New Orleans Music: Jump Jazz" with Ramsay McLean and the Survivors
- (1992) The Reggie Houston – Amasa Miller Trio "The Gazebo Sessions"
- (1992) "Christmas In New Orleans – R&B, Jazz and Gospel"
- (1996) Andrei Codrescu "Valley of Christmas"
- (2000) "New Prohibition" compilation
- (2000) Marva Wright "Marva"
- (2001) Freddy Omar "Latin Party in New Orleans"
- (2006) Nils Lofgren and Joe Sample "Creole Love Call"
- (2006) Mitch Woods "Big Easy Boogie"
- (2007) James "12" Andrews and The Crescent City Allstars "People Get Ready Now"

== Theatre ==
Year(s)	Production	Role(s)	Theater	Notes	Ref.
2011	Cats	Grizabella	Anthony Bean Community Theater	July 22 - 31	
