= King Hedley II =

2001 play by August Wilson

- Original language: English
- Written by: August Wilson
- Series: The Pittsburgh Cycle
- Subject: A man's salvation and a quest for redemption for a family and a people
- Genre: Drama
- Setting: The Hill District, Pittsburgh, Pennsylvania, 1985

Premiere
- Date: December 11, 1999
- Place: Pittsburgh Public Theater; Pittsburgh, Pennsylvania

King Hedley II is a play by American playwright August Wilson, the ninth in his ten-part series, The Pittsburgh Cycle. The play ran on Broadway in 2001 and was revived Off-Broadway in 2007.

== Productions ==
King Hedley II premiered at the Pittsburgh Public Theater in Pittsburgh, Pennsylvania, on December 11, 1999, and played a number of other regional theaters, including Seattle, Boston, Los Angeles, Chicago, and Washington before its Broadway engagement.

The play opened on Broadway at the Virginia Theatre on May 1, 2001 and closed on July 1, 2001, after 72 performances and 24 previews. The Virginia Theatre is now called The August Wilson Theatre, and according to The New York Times, "the historical significance of the renaming: The Wilson is the first Broadway theater to be named for an African-American." Directed by Marion McClinton, the cast featured Brian Stokes Mitchell (King), Leslie Uggams (Ruby), Charles Brown (Elmore), Viola Davis (Tonya), Stephen McKinley Henderson (Stool Pigeon), and Monté Russell (Mister).

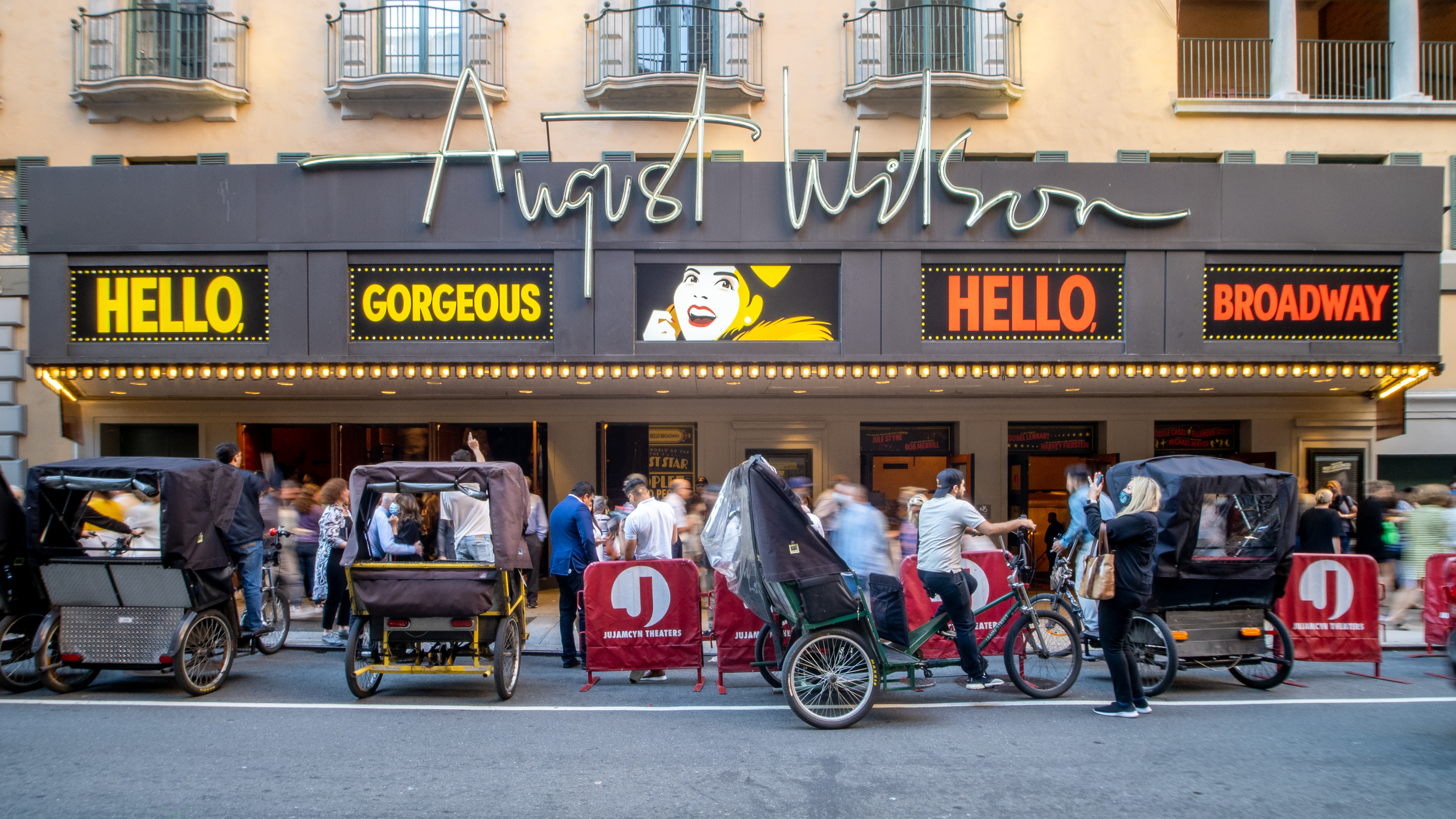
Virginia Theatre: (Now August Wilson Theatre)

The play ran off-Broadway at the Peter Norton Space, also known as the Symphony Space, in New York City. During the Signature Theatre Company production from March 11, 2007, through April 22, 2007, was a season that featured Wilson's work.

== Plot synopsis ==
King Hedley II is the ninth play in August Wilson’s ten-play cycle that, decade by decade, examines African American life in the United States during the twentieth century. Set in Pittsburgh, Pennsylvania in 1985, it tells the story of an ex-con in Pittsburgh trying to rebuild his life. The play has been described as one of Wilson's darkest, telling the tale of a man trying to save $10,000 by selling stolen refrigerators so that he can buy a video store, as well as revisiting stories of other characters initially presented in Seven Guitars. The play is set in The Hill District of Pittsburgh, Pennsylvania.

Hedley’s wish, now that he has returned to Pittsburgh from prison, is to support himself by selling refrigerators and to start a family. Set during the Reagan Administration, the play comments critically on the supply-side economics theories of the day, examining whether their stated aim of providing trickle-down benefits to all Americans truly improved the lot of urban African Americans.

Characters

- King Hedley II
- Tonya, King Hedley II's wife
- Ruby, King Hedley II's mother
- Elmore, a southern hustler (and former boyfriend of Ruby)
- Mister, friend
- Stool Pigeon, a wise man and a prophet

=== Notes on characters ===
King Hedley II draws "on characters established in Seven Guitars, King Hedley II shows the shadows of the past reaching into the present." Some of the characters presented earlier include King Hedley II, "the spiritual son of King Hedley from Seven Guitars and Stool Pigeon, a "sixty-five year old harmonica player...now a newspaper-collecting history carrier". The character of Ruby was a "vivacious young newcomer to Pittsburgh" in Seven Guitars but in King Hedley II is "...overcome with worry and regret...". Mister is Red Carter's son.

== Awards and nominations ==
2001 Broadway

- Pulitzer Prize for Drama (2000 finalist)
- Tony Award for Best Play (nomination)
- Tony Award, Best Actor in a Play (Brian Stokes Mitchell) (nomination)
- Tony Award, Best Actress in a Play (Leslie Uggams) (nomination)
- Tony Award, Best Featured Actor in a Play (Charles Brown)(nomination)
- Tony Award, Best Featured Actress in a Play, (Viola Davis) (WINNER)
- Tony Award, Best Direction of a Play (Marion McClinton) (nomination)
- Drama Desk Award for Best Play (nomination)
- Drama Desk Award Outstanding Actor in a Play (Mitchell) (nomination)
- Drama Desk Award Outstanding Featured Actor in a Play (Brown) (nomination)
- Drama Desk Award Outstanding Featured Actress in a Play (Davis) (WINNER)
- Drama Desk Award Outstanding Set Design of a Play (David Gallo) (nomination)

2007 Off-Broadway

- Audelco Award Dramatic Production of the Year (nomination)
- Lucille Lortel Award for Outstanding Revival (nomination)
