= Marion McClinton =

American theatre director (1954–2019)

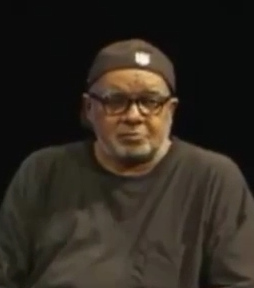
- Marion McClinton in October 2012
- Born: Marion Isaac McClinton; July 26, 1954; St. Paul, Minnesota, U.S.
- Died: November 28, 2019 (aged 65); St. Paul, Minnesota, U.S.
- Occupations: Theatre director, playwright, actor

Marion Isaac McClinton (July 26, 1954 – November 28, 2019) was an American theatre director, playwright, and actor. He was nominated for the Tony Award for King Hedley II. He won the 2000 Vivian Robinson Audelco Black Theatre Awards, Director/Dramatic Production and the 1999–2000 Obie Awards, Direction, for Jitney, and was nominated for the Drama Desk Award.

McClinton's early theater career was at Penumbra Theatre Company in Saint Paul, Minnesota where he was born. He played the part of narrator in August Wilson's first stage piece, Black Bart and the Sacred Hills in 1981, and remained active at Penumbra through the early 1990s.

He has directed all of August Wilson's plays, both on Broadway and regionally, and has been termed "One of the leading Wilson directors". The first premiere of Wilson's works that he directed was King Hedley II in 2001, taking over from the then-retired Lloyd Richards as Wilson's director.

He was an associate artist at Center Stage in Baltimore, Maryland, where he directed several Wilson plays as well as Les Blancs and Splash Hatch on the E Going Down. He directed at, among others, the Pittsburgh Public Theater (several Wilson plays), Guthrie Theater, Alabama Shakespeare Festival, and Playwrights Horizons. At the Goodman Theatre he directed a staged reading of Fences as part of the Goodman's August Wilson Celebration in February 2007. He had previously directed King Hedley II, Gem of the Ocean and Jitney at the Goodman.

He directed an Off-Broadway production of Pure Confidence in May 2009 as part of Americas Off Broadway Festival.

McClinton died from kidney failure in Saint Paul on November 28, 2019, at age 65.

== Selected works ==
- Jitney (2000 off-Broadway) - Drama Desk Award, Outstanding Director of a Play nominee
- King Hedley II (2001 Broadway) Tony Award, Best Direction of a Play nominee
- Ma Rainey's Black Bottom (2003 Broadway)
- Gem of the Ocean (2003 World premiere, Goodman Theater)
- Drowning Crow (2004 Broadway)
- Elmina's Kitchen (American premiere, 2005, Center Stage)
