= Greenwood Cemetery (Pittsburgh) =

Cemetery in Sharpsburg, Allegheny County, Pennsylvania

Coordinates: 40°30′39″N 79°55′20″W

Greenwood Cemetery is a cemetery in the Pittsburgh suburb of O'Hara Township, Pennsylvania, United States.

The cemetery was opened in 1874 and is located approximately six miles northeast of Downtown Pittsburgh at 321 Kittanning Pike (zip code 15215).

Notables interred here include Pulitzer Prize winning playwright August Wilson. Wilson's 1995 play Seven Guitars mentions the cemetery.

== See also ==
- List of cemeteries in the United States
