= Out There (Jimmie Vaughan album) =

Studio album by Jimmie Vaughan
- Released: 1998
- Studio: Ardent
- Genre: Blues
- Label: Epic
- Producer: Jimmie Vaughan, John Hampton

Jimmie Vaughan chronology
Strange Pleasure (1994)	Out There (1998)	Do You Get The Blues? (2001)

Out There is the second solo album by the American musician Jimmie Vaughan, released in 1998. Vaughan supported the album with a North American tour. Out There peaked at No. 5 on Billboard's Blues Albums chart.

== Production ==
Produced by Vaughan and John Hampton, most of the album was recorded at Ardent Studios. Dr. John sang on "Lost in You" and played piano on "Astral Projection Blues". "Motor Head Baby" is a cover of the Johnny "Guitar" Watson song. "Like a King" was written and produced by Nile Rodgers, who also played rhythm guitar on it. "Positively Meant to Be" is a tribute to Vaughan's wife. "The Ironic Twist" is an instrumental; it was nominated for a Grammy Award. "Kinky Woman" is the only track to include bass guitar.

== Critical reception ==
Professional ratings
Review scores
Source	Rating
AllMusic	3/5 stars
The Indianapolis Star	3.5/4 stars
Ottawa Citizen	4/5 stars
The Penguin Guide to Blues Recordings	2/4 stars

Texas Monthly noted that, "riding on a slinky Texas-to-California blues axis, the album has plenty of space to breathe yet contains some of Jimmie's finest soloing." The Austin American-Statesman deemed Out There "a groove album, mixing good parts of Booker T. and the M.G.'s, B.B. King, Bill Doggett and the Swan Silvertones with Vaughan's love for deep-fried blues." The Province admired the "classy picking and sly singing." The Washington Post opined that "the late Stevie Ray was flashier but Jimmie's strengths, riffing and grooving, have proven rarer and thus more valuable."

The Ottawa Citizen concluded that the "minimalist approach has led to a lot of misunderstandings in the past, but Vaughan's fiery, precise work on Out There should help overcome these misconceptions." The Indianapolis Star praised "the gospel/doo-wop underbelly of the wonderfully languid 'Astral Projection Blues'." Guitar Player determined that the album is "a swampfest of greasy grooves and maverick guitar playing, and underscores the Texan's knack for pulling rabbits out of some very old blues hats." The Boston Globe wrote that the album "is a return to Vaughan basics: the stinging yet svelte guitar tone, the warmth of a Hammond B3 organ, and a reliance on blues shuffles that hook you."

AllMusic called the album "a familiar blend of Texas blues and roadhouse blues-rock."

== Track listing ==
No.	Title	Length
1.	"Like a King"
2.	"Lost in You"
3.	"Out There"
4.	"Can't Say No"
5.	"The Ironic Twist"
6.	"Positively Meant to Be"
7.	"Motor Head Baby"
8.	"Kinky Woman"
9.	"Astral Projection Blues"
10.	"Little Son, Big Sun"
