= August Wilson House =

Historic house in Pennsylvania, United States

- U.S. National Register of Historic Places
- City of Pittsburgh Historic Structure
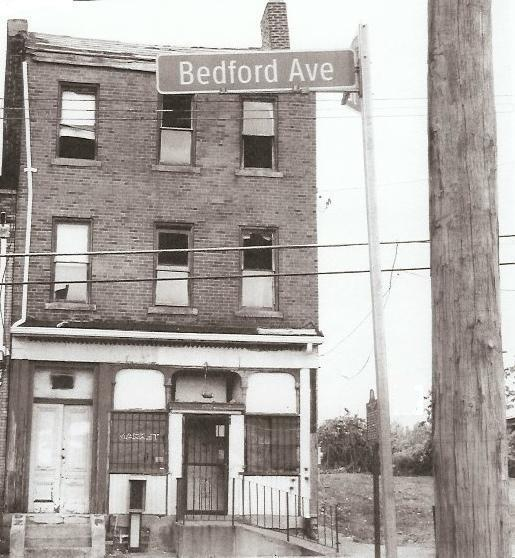

- Location within Pittsburgh Location within Pennsylvania Location within the United States
- Location: 1727 Bedford Avenue, Pittsburgh, Pennsylvania
- Coordinates: 40°26′43.01″N 79°59′8″W
- Built: 1840s
- NRHP reference No.: 13000254

Significant dates
- Added to NRHP: April 30, 2013
- Designated CPHS: February 26, 2008

The August Wilson House is a historic home located in Pittsburgh, Pennsylvania. It once belonged to the family of the famed African-American playwright August Wilson; it was Wilson's childhood home for the first twelve years of his life.

== History and architectural features ==
Located at 1727 Bedford Avenue in the Crawford-Roberts neighborhood, this historic structure was built during the 1840s. It was placed on the List of City of Pittsburgh historic designations on February 26, 2008, and listed on the National Register of Historic Places on April 30, 2013.

The House was opened as an arts center in August 2022.
