= Gem of the Ocean =

Play by August Wilson

- Original language: English
- Written by: August Wilson
- Series: The Pittsburgh Cycle
- Subject: in spiritual turmoil, a new life is sought and a magical journey across history and time is undertaken
- Genre: Drama
- Setting: 1904, the Hill District in Pittsburgh, Pennsylvania

Premiere
- Date: April 28, 2003
- Place: Goodman Theatre, Chicago, IL

Gem of the Ocean (2003) is a play by American playwright August Wilson. Although the ninth play produced, chronologically it is the first installment of his decade-by-decade, ten-play chronicle, The Pittsburgh Cycle, dramatizing the African-American experience in the twentieth century. At the time, only the 1990s remained unrepresented by a play.

== Plot ==
The play is set in 1904 at 1839 Wylie Avenue in Pittsburgh's Hill District. Aunt Ester, the drama's 285-year-old fiery matriarch, welcomes into her home Solly Two Kings, who was born into slavery and scouted for the Union Army, and Citizen Barlow, a young man from Alabama searching for a new life and in search of redemption. Aunt Ester is not too old to practice healing; she guides Barlow on a soaring, lyrical journey of spiritual awakening to the City of Bones.

== Characters ==
Aunt Ester Tyler
a former slave and a "soul-cleanser", who is the head of 1839 Wylie Avenue. She claims to be 285 years old and acts as the benevolent, if disciplinarian, ruler of the household. She entertains the romantic ambitions of Solly. She is a recurring character in several of Wilson's plays of the Pittsburgh Cycle.
Citizen Barlow
A young man from Alabama who comes to the house to be cleansed by Ester. He is enlisted to help construct a wall, and eventually journeys to The City of Bones.
Solly Two Kings
a friend of Aunt Ester. He is a former slave from Alabama who later became a conductor on the Underground Railroad and a scout for the Union Army. He makes a career of gathering up dog excrement, which he calls "pure", used for tanning and working leather. He carries a large walking stick and is in love with Aunt Ester. His birth name is Alfred Jackson, but he calls himself "Two Kings" (referring to King David and King Solomon), and is nicknamed Solly.
"Black" Mary Wilks
Ester's housekeeper and her protégé in the art of Soul Cleansing. Caesar's sister. She performs most of the household tasks, but never to the satisfaction of Ester.
Caesar Wilks
Black Mary's brother, a policeman, baker and land-owner. He upholds the law at all costs. He practices strict capitalism and has no qualms with killing a man over a petty crime.
Eli
Aunt Ester's caregiver, he protects the inhabitants and is constructing a wall. He was Solly's comrade in his efforts on the Underground Railroad and for the Union Army.
Rutherford Selig
A peddler and friend of Ester's who frequently visits the house. He sells rocks, cobblestones, pots, pans and other crockery.

== Synopsis ==
1904, Pittsburgh: 1839 Wylie Avenue in the Hill District is the home of Aunt Ester, a 285-year-old former slave, who is a keeper of tradition and history for her people and a renowned cleanser of souls. The people who pass through her parlor and kitchen include Eli, Aunt Ester's protector; Black Mary, her housekeeper and protégé; Solly Two Kings, a former slave, conductor on the Underground Railroad and scout for the Union Army; Black Mary's brother, Caesar, a constable; Rutherford Selig, a peddler; and Citizen Barlow, a new arrival from down South who needs Aunt Ester to help him absolve the guilt and shame from a crime he's committed.

An incident at the local mill has ignited the African-American community: a black man is accused of stealing a bucket of nails. Rather than confessing to a crime he didn't commit, he jumps into the river and drowns. This makes him a martyr to his co-workers, who have gone on strike and are rioting. Caesar, the local law enforcement official, is in the middle of it. He arrests several people and shoots another.

Against this turbulent backdrop Aunt Ester launches Citizen on a spiritual journey aboard the legendary slave ship, Gem of the Ocean, to the mythical City of Bones. There, Citizen comes to understand the story of his ancestors and faces the truth about his crime and the man he wronged.

During Citizen's journey, the local steel mill is discovered to be on fire. Caesar returns to the house and accuses Solly of arson. Solly strikes Caesar with his walking stick and flees. Aunt Ester and Rutherford Selig help Solly sneak out of the city, accompanied by Citizen Barlow. However, Caesar catches up to Solly and shoots him. The mortally wounded Solly is returned to the house and placed on the kitchen table where Black Mary and Ester clean and dress his body for burial. When Caesar comes to Aunt Ester's to question Citizen about the incident, Black Mary renounces her brother Caesar. Caesar leaves and Citizen dons Solly's coat and takes up his walking stick, intending to continue where Solly left off, guiding his people on their journey toward freedom.

== Productions ==
- Gem of the Ocean premiered at The Goodman Theatre in Chicago on April 28, 2003.
- A production opened at the Mark Taper Forum in Los Angeles on July 31, 2003.
- In 2004 and 2005, the play ran at the Walter Kerr Theatre on Broadway and received five Tony Award nominations. Ben Brantley of The New York Times wrote of the play: "A swelling battle hymn of transporting beauty. Theatergoers who have followed August Wilson's career will find in Gem a touchstone for everything else he has written".

Since its premiere and Broadway run, Gem of the Ocean has been widely produced by theatre companies across the country:

- Arena Stage (Washington, D.C.), as part of their 2006–2007 season
- Indiana Repertory Theatre, as part of their 2006–2007 season
- Milwaukee Repertory Theater, as part of their 2006–2007 season
- Oregon Shakespeare Festival in Ashland, Oregon, April 21 – October 27, 2007.
- The Actors' Group (TAG) Theatre in Honolulu, Hawaii, February 18 – March 13, 2011, and again September 20-October 6, 2024
- Hartford Stage in Hartford, Connecticut, May 12 – June 5, 2011.
- Hangar Theatre in Ithaca, New York, July 28 - August 6, 2011.
- The Sister Thea Bowman Memorial Theater in the Prescott Joseph Center for Community Enhancement in Oakland, California. August 2011 – Six Performances: Friday, Saturday evenings and Sunday matinees August 19–21 and 26–28.
- The Human Race Theatre Company in Dayton, Ohio, March 30 - April 13, 2012.
- Playhouse on the Square in Memphis, Tennessee, September 23 – October 16, 2011.
- Trustus Theatre in Columbia, South Carolina, 10 February 2012 -until 4 March 2012. The play was the third play in the ten-play series to have been produced at this theater since its founding.
- Karamu House in Cleveland, Ohio, May 11 - June 4, 2012.
- Cygnet Theater Company, San Diego, California, 2013
- Old Town Theater in San Diego, California, January 24 - February 24, 2013.
- The Playhouse in Louisville, Kentucky, April 9–13, 2014
- Court Theater, University of Chicago, September 19 - October 11, 2015.
- Marin Theatre Company, Mill Valley, California, January 14 – February 14, 2016
- Zoellner Arts Center at Lehigh University, Bethlehem, Pennsylvania, April 8–16, 2016.
- Metropolitan Ensemble Theatre in Kansas City, Missouri, February 23 – March 11, 2017.
- South Coast Repertory in Costa Mesa, California, October 14 – November 11, 2017.
- Round House Theatre in Bethesda, Maryland, November 28 – December 30, 2018.
- Pittsburgh Playwrights Theater Company, outdoor production on a one-room set at 1839 Wylie Ave., (Aunt Ester's fictional address in Pittsburgh's Hill District), August 24 – September 22, 2019
- The Goodman Theatre in Chicago, January 22 – February 27, 2022.
- Trinity Repertory Company in Providence, Rhode Island, February 24 - March 27, 2022.
- Portland Center Stage in Portland, Oregon, March 5 - April 3, 2022.
- TheatreWorks (Silicon Valley) in Mountain View, California, April 6 - May 1, 2022.
- Detroit Repertory Theatre, January 12 - March 5, 2023.
- Two River Theater in Red Bank, New Jersey, June 8–30, 2024, with Brandon J. Dirden and Crystal A. Dickinson
- Dillard University Theatre in New Orleans, Louisiana, in November 2008 and again in October 2024.
- Actors' Shakespeare Project in Boston, Massachusetts April-May 2026

== Awards and nominations ==
Year	Ceremony	Award	Nominee	Result
2005	Tony Awards	Best Play		Nominated
2005	Tony Awards	Best Leading Actress in a Play	Phylicia Rashad	Nominated
2005	Tony Awards	Best Scenic Design in a Play	David Gallo	Nominated
2005	Tony Awards	Best Costume Design in a Play	Constanza Romero	Nominated
2005	Tony Awards	Best Lighting Design in a Play	Donald Holder	Nominated
2005	Drama Desk Awards	Outstanding Lighting Design	Donald Holder	Nominated
2005	Drama League Awards	Distinguished Performance Award	Phylicia Rashad	Nominated
2005	Outer Critics Circle Awards	Outstanding Broadway Play		Nominated
2005	Outer Critics Circle Awards	Outstanding Lighting Design	Donald Holder	Nominated
