= August Wilson =

American playwright (1945–2005)

- Born: Frederick August Kittel Jr. April 27, 1945; Pittsburgh, Pennsylvania, U.S.
- Died: October 2, 2005 (aged 60); Seattle, Washington, U.S.
- Resting place: Greenwood Cemetery
- Occupations: Author, playwright
- Spouses: Brenda Burton (m. 1969; div. 1972) Judy Oliver (m. 1981; div. 1990) Constanza Romero (m. 1994)
- Children: 2
- Writing career
- Notable works: Ma Rainey's Black Bottom (1984); Fences (1987); Joe Turner's Come and Gone (1988); The Piano Lesson (1990)
- Notable awards: Pulitzer Prize for Drama (1987, 1990); Whiting Award (1986); Heinz Award in the Arts and Humanities (2004)

August Wilson (né Frederick August Kittel Jr.; April 27, 1945 – October 2, 2005) was an American playwright. He has been referred to as the "theater's poet of Black America". He is best known for a series of 10 plays, collectively called The Pittsburgh Cycle (or The Century Cycle), which chronicle the experiences and heritage of the African-American community in the 20th century. Plays in the series include Fences (1987) and The Piano Lesson (1990), each of which won Wilson the Pulitzer Prize for Drama, as well as Ma Rainey's Black Bottom (1984) and Joe Turner's Come and Gone (1988). In 2006, Wilson was inducted into the American Theater Hall of Fame.

Other themes range from the systemic and historical exploitation of African Americans, race relations, identity, migration, and racial discrimination. Viola Davis said that Wilson's writing "captures our humor, our vulnerabilities, our tragedies, our trauma. And he humanizes us. And he allows us to talk." Since Wilson's death, three of his plays have been adapted or re-adapted into films: Fences (2016), Ma Rainey's Black Bottom (2020) and The Piano Lesson (2024). Denzel Washington has shepherded the films and has vowed to continue Wilson's legacy by adapting the rest of his plays into films for a wider audience. Washington said, "the greatest part of what's left of my career is making sure that August is taken care of".

== Early life ==
Wilson was born Frederick August Kittel Jr. in the Hill District of Pittsburgh, Pennsylvania, the fourth of six children. His father, Frederick August Kittel Sr., was a Sudeten German immigrant, who was a baker/pastry cook. His mother, Daisy Wilson, was an African-American woman from North Carolina who cleaned homes for a living. Wilson's anecdotal history reports that his maternal grandmother walked from North Carolina to Pennsylvania in search of a better life. Wilson's mother raised the children alone until he was five in a two-room apartment behind a grocery store at 1727 Bedford Avenue; his father was mostly absent from his childhood. Wilson later wrote under his mother's surname.

The economically depressed neighborhood where he was raised was inhabited predominantly by Black Americans and Jewish and Italian immigrants. Life was tough for the Kittel siblings as they were biracial. August struggled with finding a sense of belonging to a particular culture and did not feel that he truly fit into African-American culture or White culture until later in life. Wilson's mother divorced his father and married David Bedford in the 1950s, and the family moved from the Hill District to the then predominantly White working-class neighborhood of Hazelwood, where they encountered racial hostility; bricks were thrown through a window at their new home. They were soon forced out of their house and on to their next home.

The Hill District went on to become the setting of numerous plays in the Pittsburgh Cycle. His experiences growing up there with a strong matriarch shaped the way his plays would be written.

External videos
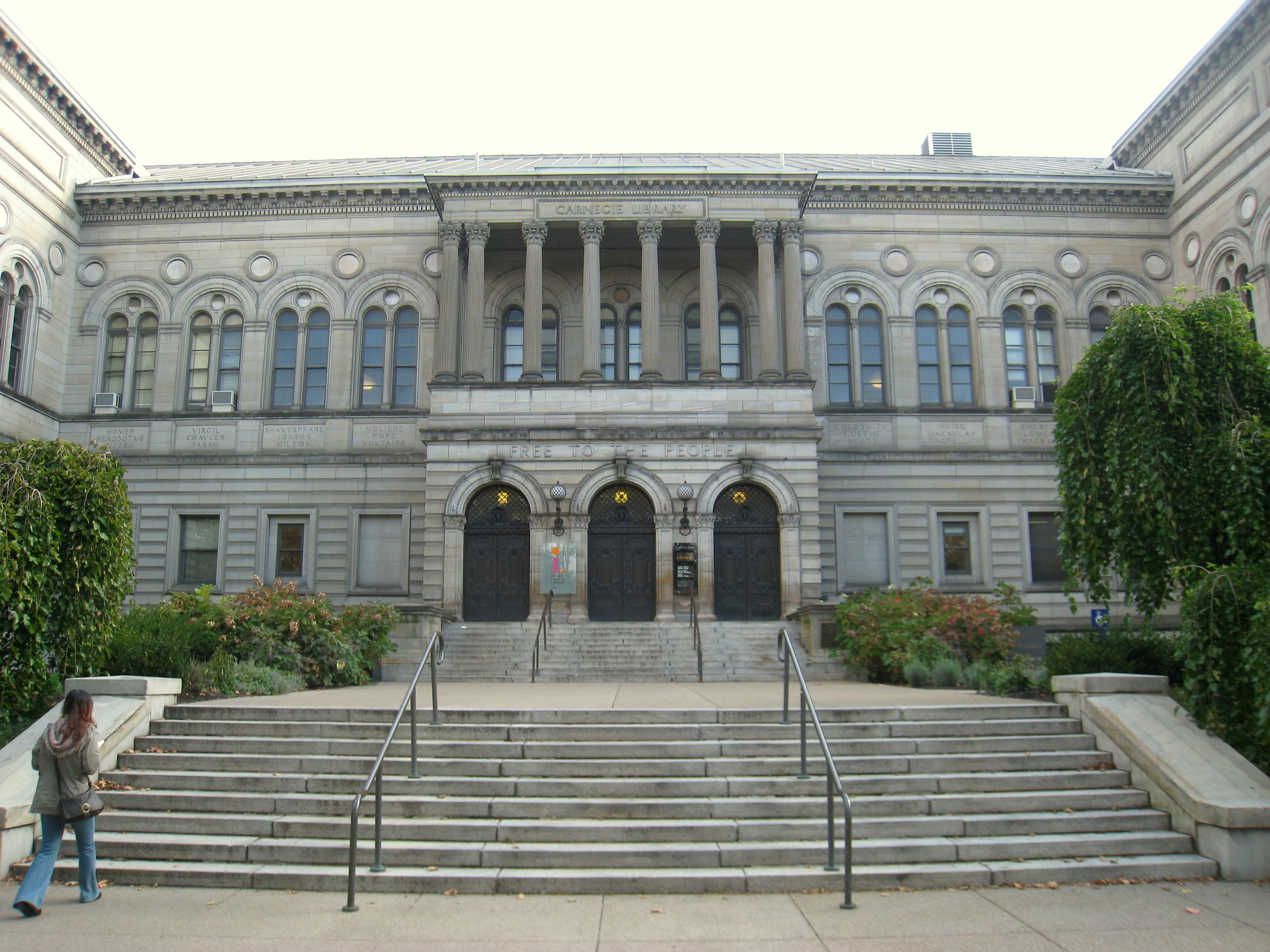
- American Masters, August Wilson: The Ground on Which I Stand, PBS, 1:24:39

Raised Catholic, in 1959 Wilson was one of 14 African-American students at Central Catholic High School but dropped out after one year. He then attended Connelley Vocational High School, but found the curriculum unchallenging. He dropped out of Gladstone High School in the 10th grade in 1960 after his teacher accused him of plagiarizing a 20-page paper he wrote on Napoleon I of France. Wilson hid his decision from his mother because he did not want to disappoint her. At the age of 16 he began working menial jobs, where he met a wide variety of people on whom some of his later characters were based, such as Sam in The Janitor (1985).

Wilson's extensive use of the Carnegie Library of Pittsburgh resulted in its later awarding him an honorary high school diploma. Wilson, who said he had learned to read at the age of four, began reading Black writers at the library when he was 12 and spent the remainder of his teen years educating himself through the books of Ralph Ellison, Richard Wright, Langston Hughes, Arna Bontemps, and others.

== Career ==
=== 1960s ===
Wilson knew that he wanted to be a writer, but this created tension with his mother, who wanted him to become a lawyer. She forced him to leave the family home and he enlisted in the United States Army for a three-year stint in 1962, but he was discharged after a year and went back to working various odd jobs as a porter, short-order cook, gardener, and dishwasher.

Frederick August Kittel Jr. changed his name to August Wilson to honor his mother after his father's death in 1965. That same year, he discovered the blues as sung by Bessie Smith, and he bought a stolen typewriter for $10, which he often pawned when money was tight. At 20, he decided he was a poet and submitted work to such magazines as Harper's. He began to write in bars, the local cigar store, and cafes—longhand on table napkins and on yellow notepads, absorbing the voices and characters around him. He liked to write on cafe napkins because, he said, it freed him up and made him less self-conscious as a writer. He would then gather the notes and type them up at home. Gifted with a talent for catching dialect and accents, Wilson had an "astonishing memory", which he put to full use during his career. He slowly learned not to censor the language he heard when incorporating it into his work.

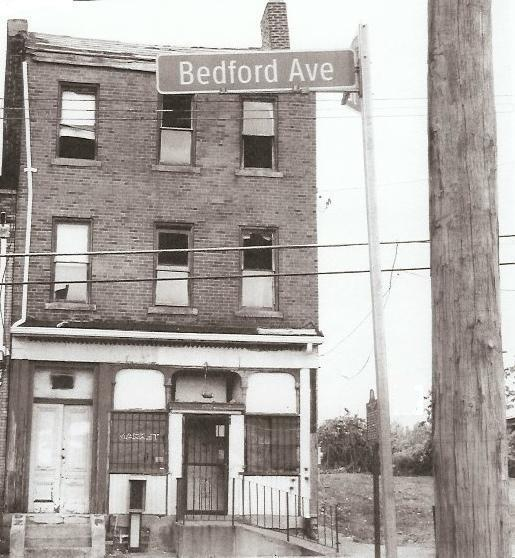
Wilson's childhood home at 1727 Bedford Avenue in Pittsburgh

Malcolm X's voice influenced Wilson's life and work (such as The Ground on Which I Stand, 1996). Both the Nation of Islam (NOI) and the Black Power movement spoke to him regarding self-sufficiency, self-defense, and self-determination, and he appreciated the origin myths that Elijah Muhammad supported. In 1969, Wilson married Brenda Burton, a Muslim, and became associated with the NOI, though he reportedly did not convert. He and Brenda had one daughter, Sakina Ansari-Wilson. The couple divorced in 1972.

In 1968, along with his friend Rob Penny, Wilson co-founded the Black Horizon Theater in the Hill District of Pittsburgh. Wilson's first play, Recycling, was performed for audiences in small theaters, schools and public housing community centers for 50 cents a ticket. Among these early efforts was Jitney, which he revised more than two decades later as part of his 10-play cycle on 20th-century Pittsburgh. He had no directing experience. He recalled: "Someone had looked around and said, 'Who's going to be the director?' I said, 'I will.' I said that because I knew my way around the library. So I went to look for a book on how to direct a play. I found one called The Fundamentals of Play Directing and checked it out."

=== 1970s ===
In 1976, Vernell Lillie, who had founded the Kuntu Repertory Theatre at the University of Pittsburgh two years earlier, directed Wilson's The Homecoming. That same year Wilson saw Athol Fugard's Sizwe Banzi is Dead, staged at the Pittsburgh Public Theater, the first time he attended professionally produced drama. Wilson, Penny, and poet Maisha Baton then founded the Kuntu Writers Workshop to bring African-American writers together and to assist them in publication and production. Both organizations remain active.

In 1978, Wilson moved to Saint Paul, Minnesota, at the suggestion of his friend, director Claude Purdy, who helped him secure a job writing educational scripts for the Science Museum of Minnesota. In 1980, he received a fellowship for The Playwrights' Center in Minneapolis. He quit the museum in 1981, but continued writing plays. For three years, he was a part-time cook for the Little Brothers of the Poor. Wilson had a long association with the Penumbra Theatre Company of St. Paul, which was initially funded by a federal Comprehensive Employment and Training Act (CETA) grant and which premiered some of his plays. He wrote Fullerton Street, which has been unproduced and unpublished, in 1980. It follows the Joe Louis vs. Billy Conn fight in 1941 and the loss of values attendant on the Great Migration to the urban North.

=== 1980s ===
Throughout the 1980s, Wilson wrote the majority of his work including Jitney (1982), Ma Rainey's Black Bottom (1984), Fences (1985), Joe Turner's Come and Gone (1986), and The Piano Lesson (1987).

In 1987, St. Paul's mayor George Latimer named May 27 "August Wilson Day". He was honored because he is the only person from Minnesota to win a Pulitzer Prize for Drama.

=== 1990s ===
In 1990, Wilson left St. Paul after getting divorced and moved to Seattle. There he developed a relationship with Seattle Repertory Theatre, which produced his entire 10-play cycle and his one-man show How I Learned What I Learned.

Though he was a writer dedicated to writing for theater, a Hollywood studio proposed filming Wilson's play Fences. He insisted that a Black director be hired for the film, saying: "I declined a White director not on the basis of race but on the basis of culture. White directors are not qualified for the job. The job requires someone who shares the specifics of the culture of Black Americans." The film remained unmade until 2016, when Denzel Washington directed the film Fences, starring Washington and Viola Davis. It earned Wilson a posthumous Oscar nomination.

Wilson received many honorary degrees, including an honorary Doctor of Humanities from the University of Pittsburgh, of which he was a trustee from 1992 until 1995.

Wilson maintained a strong voice in the progress and development of the (then) contemporary Black theater, undoubtedly taking influences from the examples of his youth, such as those displayed during the Black Arts Movement. One of the most notable examples of Wilson's strong opinions and critiques of what was Black theater's state in the 1990s, was the "On Cultural Power: The August Wilson/Robert Brustein Discussion" where Wilson argued for a completely Black theater with all positions filled by Blacks. Conversely, he argued that Black actors should not play roles not specifically Black (e.g., no Black Hamlet). Brustein heatedly took an opposing view.

=== 2000s ===
In 2005, Wilson's final installment in his ten-part series The Century Cycle, titled Radio Golf, opened. It was first performed in 2005 by the Yale Repertory Theatre in New Haven, Connecticut and had its Broadway premiere in 2007 at the Cort Theatre. It would become known as Wilson's final work.

== Post–Black Arts Movement ==
Although Wilson's work is not formally recognized within the literary canon of the Black Arts Movement, he was certainly a product of its mission, co-founding the Black Horizon Theatre in his hometown of Pittsburgh in 1968. Situated in Pittsburgh's Hill District, a historically and predominantly Black neighborhood, the Black Horizon Theatre became a cultural hub of Black creativity and community building. As a playwright of what is considered the Post–Black Arts Movement, Wilson inherited the spirit of BAM, producing plays that celebrated the history and poetic sensibilities of Black people. His iconic Century Cycle successfully tracked and synthesized the experiences of Black America in the 20th century, using each historical decade, from 1904 to 1997, to document the physical, emotional, mental, and political strivings of Black life in the wake of emancipation.

Wilson's best-known plays are Fences (1985) (which won a Pulitzer Prize and a Tony Award), The Piano Lesson (1990) (a Pulitzer Prize and the New York Drama Critics' Circle Award), Ma Rainey's Black Bottom, and Joe Turner's Come and Gone.

Wilson stated that he was most influenced by "the four Bs": blues music, the Argentine writer and poet Jorge Luis Borges, the playwright Amiri Baraka and the painter Romare Bearden. He went on to add writers Ed Bullins and James Baldwin to the list. He noted:

From Borges, those wonderful gaucho stories from which I learned that you can be specific as to a time and place and culture and still have the work resonate with the universal themes of love, honor, duty, betrayal, etc. From Amiri Baraka, I learned that all art is political, although I don't write political plays. From Romare Bearden I learned that the fullness and richness of everyday life can be rendered without compromise or sentimentality.

He valued Bullins and Baldwin for their honest representations of everyday life.

Like Bearden, Wilson worked with collage techniques in writing: "I try to make my plays the equal of his canvases. In creating plays I often use the image of a stewing pot in which I toss various things that I'm going to make use of—a black cat, a garden, a bicycle, a man with a scar on his face, a pregnant woman, a man with a gun." The central male character in Bearden's Mill Hand’s Lunch Bucket inspired the character of Herald Loomis in Joe Turner's Come and Gone. On the meaning of his work, Wilson stated:

I once wrote this short story called "The Best Blues Singer in the World", and it went like this—"The streets that Balboa walked were his own private ocean, and Balboa was drowning." End of story. That says it all. Nothing else to say. I've been rewriting that same story over and over again. All my plays are rewriting that same story.

=== The Pittsburgh Cycle ===
Wilson's Pittsburgh Cycle, also often referred to as his Century Cycle, consists of ten plays, nine of which are set in Pittsburgh's Hill District (the other being set in Chicago), an African-American neighborhood that takes on a mythic literary significance like Thomas Hardy's Wessex, William Faulkner's Yoknapatawpha County, or Irish playwright Brian Friel's Ballybeg. The plays are each set in a different decade and aim to sketch the Black experience in the 20th century and "raise consciousness through theater" and echo "the poetry in the everyday language of Black America". His writing of the Black experience always featured strong female characters and sometimes included elements of the supernatural. In his book, he wrote "My mother's a very strong, principled woman. My female characters . . . come in a large part from my mother."

As for the elements of the supernatural, Wilson often featured some form of superstition or old tradition in plays that came down to supernatural roots. One of his plays well known for featuring this is The Piano Lesson. In the play, the piano is used and releases spirits of the ancestors. Wilson wanted to create such an event in the play that the audience was left to decide what was real or not. He was fascinated by the power of theater as a medium where a community at large could come together to bear witness to events and currents unfolding.

Wilson told The Paris Review:

I think my plays offer (White Americans) a different way to look at Black Americans. For instance, in Fences they see a garbageman, a person they don't really look at, although they see a garbageman every day. By looking at Troy's life, White people find out that the content of this Black garbageman's life is affected by the same things – love, honor, beauty, betrayal, duty. Recognizing that these things are as much part of his life as theirs can affect how they think about and deal with Black people in their lives.

Although the plays of the cycle are not strictly connected to the degree of a serial story, some characters appear (at various ages) in more than one of the cycle's plays. Children of characters in earlier plays may appear in later plays. The character most frequently mentioned in the cycle is Aunt Ester, a "washer of souls". She is reported to be 285 years old in Gem of the Ocean, which takes place in her home at 1839 Wylie Avenue, and 349 in Two Trains Running. She dies in 1985, during the events of King Hedley II. Much of the action of Radio Golf revolves around the plan to demolish and redevelop that house, some years after her death. Aunt Ester is a symbolic and recurring figure that represents the African-American struggle. She is "not literally three centuries old but a succession of folk priestesses... [s]he embodies a weighty history of tragedy and triumph". The plays often include an apparently mentally impaired oracular character (different in each play)—for example, Hedley Sr. in Seven Guitars, Gabriel in Fences, Stool Pigeon in King Hedley II, or Hambone in Two Trains Running.

Year of premiere	Title	Decade	Opened on Broadway
1982	Jitney	1970s	2017 – Samuel J. Friedman Theatre
1984	Ma Rainey's Black Bottom	1920s	1984 – Cort Theatre
1985	Fences	1950s	1987 – 46th Street Theatre
1986	Joe Turner's Come and Gone	1910s	1988 – Ethel Barrymore
1987	The Piano Lesson	1930s	1990 – Walter Kerr
1990	Two Trains Running	1960s	1992 – Walter Kerr
1995	Seven Guitars	1940s	1996 – Walter Kerr
1999	King Hedley II	1980s	2001 – Virginia Theatre
2003	Gem of the Ocean	1900s	2004 – Walter Kerr
2005	Radio Golf	1990s	2007 – Cort Theatre

Chicago's Goodman Theatre was the first theater in the world to produce the entire 10-play cycle, in productions which spanned from 1986 to 2007. Two of the Goodman's productions—Seven Guitars and Gem of the Ocean—were world premieres. Israel Hicks produced the entire 10-play cycle from 1990 to 2009 for the Denver Center Theatre Company. Geva Theatre Center produced all 10 plays in decade order from 2007 to 2011 as August Wilson's American Century. The Huntington Theatre Company of Boston has produced all 10 plays, finishing in 2012. During Wilson's life he worked closely with The Huntington to produce the later plays. Pittsburgh Public Theater was the first theater company in Pittsburgh to produce the entire Century Cycle, including the world premiere of King Hedley II to open the O'Reilly Theater in Downtown Pittsburgh.

TAG – The Actors' Group, in Honolulu, Hawaii, produced all 10 plays in the cycle starting in 2004 with Two Trains Running and culminating in 2015 with Ma Rainey's Black Bottom. All shows were Hawaii premieres, all were extremely successful at the box office and garnered many local theatre awards for the actors and the organization. The Black Rep in St. Louis and the Anthony Bean Community Theater in New Orleans have also presented the complete cycle.

In the years after Wilson's death the 10-play cycle has been referred to as The August Wilson Century Cycle and as The American Century Cycle.

Two years before his death in 2005, Wilson wrote and performed an unpublished one-man play entitled How I Learned What I Learned about the power of art and the power of possibility. This was produced at New York's Signature Theatre and directed by Todd Kreidler, Wilson's friend and protégé. How I Learned explores his days as a struggling young writer in Pittsburgh's Hill District and how the neighborhood and its people inspired his cycle of plays about the African-American experience.

== Personal life ==
Wilson was married three times. His first marriage was to Brenda Burton from 1969 to 1972. They had one daughter, Sakina Ansari, born 1970. In 1981, he married Judy Oliver, a social worker; they divorced in 1990. He married again in 1994 and was survived by his third wife, costume designer Constanza Romero, whom he met on the set of The Piano Lesson. They had a daughter, Azula Carmen Wilson. Wilson also was survived by siblings Freda Ellis, Barbara Jean Wilson, Linda Jean Kittel, Richard Kittel, Donna Conley and Edwin Kittel.

== Death ==
Wilson reported that he had been diagnosed with liver cancer in June 2005 and been given three to five months to live. He died at the age of 60 on October 2, 2005, at Swedish Medical Center in Seattle, and was interred at Greenwood Cemetery, Pittsburgh, on October 8. He reportedly requested a "Black funeral" at Saint Paul Cathedral, but permission for a non-Catholic funeral was not granted by the diocese. A memorial service was instead held at the University of Pittsburgh.

== Work ==
First produced	First performance	Title	Notes
1976	Penumbra Theater	Recycle	Written in 1965–1973; Originally named "Recycling"; directed and acted by August Wilson.
1976 (not published)	Kuntu Repertory Theater	The Homecoming	Performed in Schenley High School, directed by Vernell Lillie; produced again in 1989.
1976	Ujima Theater	The Coldest Day of the Year	Written in 1976; part of "The Wood of the Cross" trilogy.
(not published)	(not performed)	Placebo	Written in 1978; part of "The Wood of the Cross" trilogy.
(not produced)	(not performed)	"Profiles in Science" Series	One Man and One Woman plays written while Wilson was working at the Science Museum of Minnesota. Plays include "An Evening with Margaret Mead", as well as "Profiles in Science: William Harvey" and a play about Charles Darwin.
(not produced)	(not performed)	Fullerton Street	Written in 1980; originally intended to be Wilson's play about the 1940s.
1981	Penumbra Theater	Black Bart and the Sacred Hills	Written in 1977; originally accepted at the O'Neill Theater Center in Connecticut.
1982	Allegheny Repertory Theater	Jitney!	Written in 1979; performed October 29, 1982.
1982	O'Neill Theater	Ma Rainey's Black Bottom	The 1982 production was a reading Wilson did for O'Neill Theater Writers to introduce them to some of his work beyond Black Bart and the Sacred Hills; the 1984 production was the play's first open performance at Yale Repertory Theater.
1985		The Janitor	Part of "The Wood of the Cross" trilogy. Published in Short Pieces from the New Dramatists, edited by Stan Chervin, pp. 81–82. New York: Broadway Play Publishing, 1985.
1985	Yale Repertory Theater	Fences	Written in 1983; Produced in 1985
1986	Yale Repertory Theatre	Joe Turner's Come and Gone	Written and Published in 1984. First performed in 1986 at Yale Repertory Theater.
1987	O'Neill Theater	The Piano Lesson	Written in 1986; presented as a staged reading in 1987 at the O'Neill Theater's National Playwrights' Conference.
1990	Yale Repertory Theatre	Two Trains Running	
1995	Goodman Theater	Seven Guitars	First Draft Finished in 1993.
1996	Princeton University	The Ground on Which I Stand [speech]	Given at the 11th biennial Theatre Communications Group national conference at New Jersey's Princeton University.
1999	O'Reilly Theater	King Hedley II	
2002	Seattle Repertory Theater	How I Learned What I Learned	
2003	Goodman Theater	Gem of the Ocean	
2005	Yale Repertory Theatre	Radio Golf	

== Awards and nominations ==
Year	Award	Category	Project	Result
1985	Tony Awards	Best Play	Ma Rainey's Black Bottom	Nominated
1987	Tony Awards	Best Play	Fences	Won
1988	Tony Awards	Best Play	Joe Turner's Come and Gone	Nominated
1990	Tony Awards	Best Play	The Piano Lesson	Nominated
1992	Tony Awards	Best Play	Two Trains Running	Nominated
1996	Tony Awards	Best Play	Seven Guitars	Nominated
2001	Tony Awards	Best Play	King Hedley II	Nominated
2005	Tony Awards	Best Play	Gem of the Ocean	Nominated
2007	Tony Awards	Best Play	Radio Golf	Nominated
1985	Drama Desk Awards	Outstanding New Play	Ma Rainey's Black Bottom	Nominated
1987	Drama Desk Awards	Outstanding New Play	Fences	Won
1988	Drama Desk Awards	Outstanding New Play	Joe Tuner's Come and Gone	Nominated
1990	Drama Desk Awards	Outstanding New Play	The Piano Lesson	Won
1996	Drama Desk Awards	Outstanding New Play	Seven Guitars	Nominated
2000	Drama Desk Awards	Outstanding New Play	Jitney	Nominated
2007	Drama Desk Awards	Outstanding New Play	Radio Golf	Nominated
1987	Pulitzer Prize	For Drama	Fences	Won
1989	Pulitzer Prize	For Drama	The Piano Lesson	Nominated
1990	Pulitzer Prize	For Drama	The Piano Lesson	Won
1992	Pulitzer Prize	For Drama	Two Trains Running	Nominated
1995	Pulitzer Prize	For Drama	Seven Guitars	Nominated
2000	Pulitzer Prize	For Drama	King Hedley II	Nominated
2017	Academy Awards	Best Adapted Screenplay	Fences	Nominated
1995	Primetime Emmy Awards	Outstanding Television Movie	The Piano Lesson	Nominated
1995	Primetime Emmy Awards	Outstanding Writing for a Miniseries or a Special	The Piano Lesson	Nominated
1985	New York Drama Critics' Circle Award	Best Play	Ma Rainey's Black Bottom	Won
1987	New York Drama Critics' Circle Award	Best Play	Fences	Won
1988	New York Drama Critics' Circle Award	Best Play	Joe Turner's Come and Gone	Won
1990	New York Drama Critics' Circle Award	Best Play	The Piano Lesson	Won
1992	New York Drama Critics' Circle Award	Best American Play	Two Trains Running	Won
1996	New York Drama Critics' Circle Award	Best Play	Seven Guitars	Won
2000	New York Drama Critics' Circle Award	Best Play	Jitney	Won
2007	New York Drama Critics' Circle Award	Best American Play	Radio Golf	Won

== Legacy and honors ==
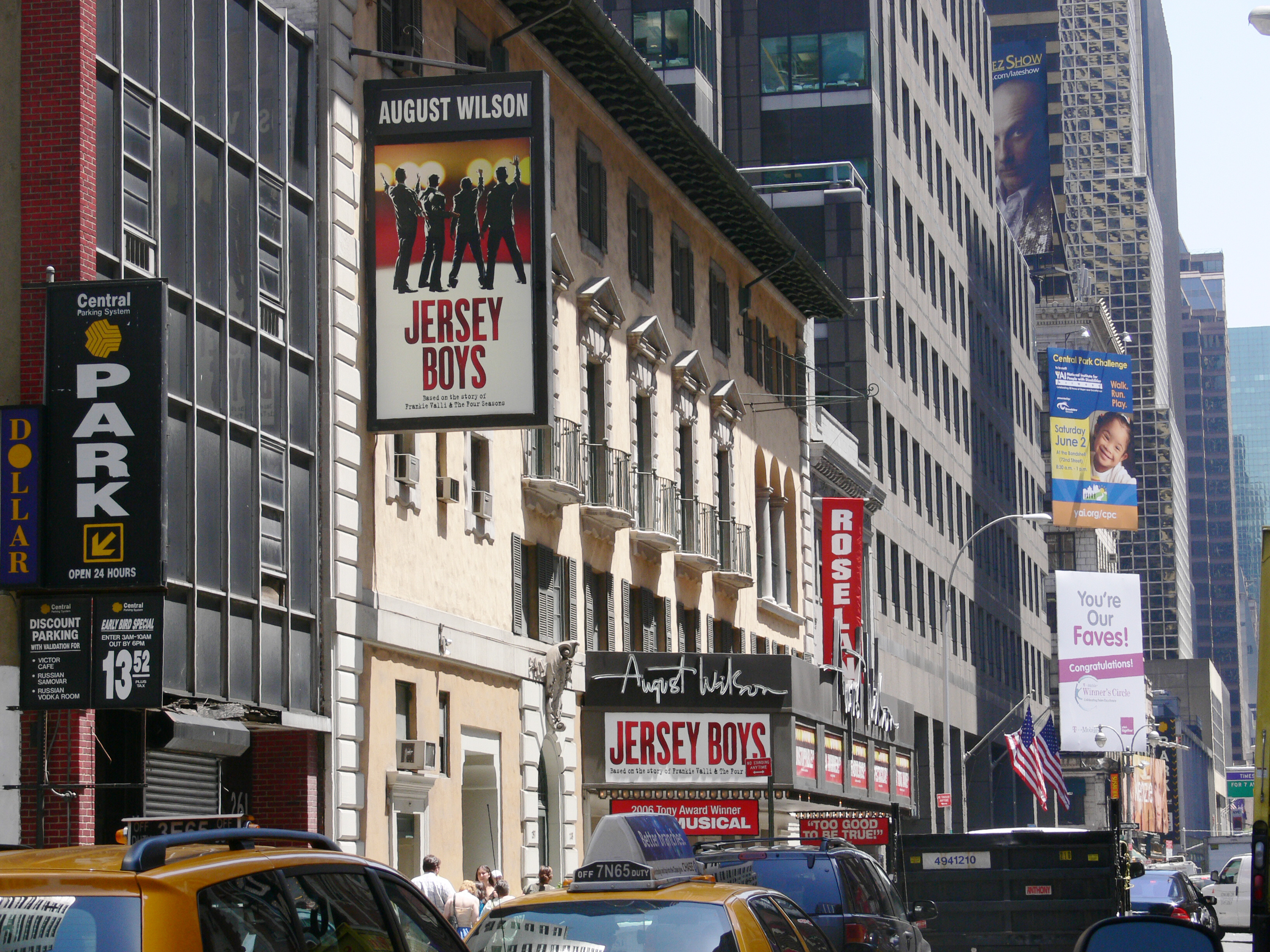
The August Wilson Theatre, New York City

The childhood home of Wilson and his six siblings, at 1727 Bedford Avenue in Pittsburgh, was declared a historic landmark by the State of Pennsylvania on May 30, 2007. On February 26, 2008, Pittsburgh City Council placed the house on the List of City of Pittsburgh historic designations. On April 30, 2013, the August Wilson House was added to the National Register of Historic Places.

In Pittsburgh, there is an August Wilson Center for African American Culture. The center includes a permanent exhibition on Wilson's life in Pittsburgh's Hill District, "August Wilson: A Writer's Landscape."

On October 16, 2005, fourteen days after Wilson's death, the Virginia Theatre in New York City's Broadway Theater District was renamed the August Wilson Theatre. It is the first Broadway theatre to bear the name of an African American. The theatre has run many shows, including Jersey Boys, Groundhog Day, and Mean Girls.

In 2007, True Colors Artistic Director Emeritus Kenny Leon and then-Associate Artistic Director Todd Kreidler founded the National August Wilson Monologue Competition to honor Wilson's artistic legacy and foster a new generation of creative minds. High school students, supported by professional actors, mentors, local drama teachers and others learn a monologue from one of Wilson's plays, and perform it in front of a professional jury. This tribute to Wilson's work was an official contest in many American cities until 2021 (when it was held virtually due to Covid) from Atlanta (GA), Boston (MA), Buffalo (NY), Chicago IL), Dallas (TX), East Lansing (MI), Greensboro (NC), Hampton Roads (VA), Los Angeles (CA), Maryland, Milwaukee (WI), New Haven (CT), New York (NY), Pittsburgh (PA), Portland (OR), San Diego (CA), Seattle (WA), and Urbana-Champaign (IL). The national winners of the contest received a scholarship and the chance to perform on Broadway. The program is featured in two documentaries: The Start of Dreams (2010) directed by The Horne Brothers, and Giving Voice (2018) directed by James D. Stern and Fernando Villena.

In Seattle, Washington, along the south side of the Seattle Repertory Theatre, the vacated Republican Street between Warren Avenue N. and 2nd Avenue N. on the Seattle Center grounds has been renamed August Wilson Way.

In 2015, Denzel Washington announced a partnership with the Wilson Estate to produce movie-adaptations of all 10 plays in the Century Cycle, initially planning on one a year with his long-time producing partner Todd Black. In 2016, Washington directed and produced Fences, playing Troy Maxon opposite Viola Davis' Rose Maxon. In 2020, the George C. Wolfe-directed Ma Rainey's Black Bottom was released, starring Viola Davis in the title role with Chadwick Boseman as Levee. And in 2024, the pair co-produced The Piano Lesson, directed by his son Malcom Washington, who co-wrote the adaptation with Virgil Williams (Mudbound). The film featured Samuel L. Jackson as Doaker, another Washington sibling, John David as Boy Willie, and Danielle Deadwyler as Berniece. Washington and Black are currently working on the next film adaptation Joe Turner's Come and Gone.

In September 2016, an existing community park near his childhood home was renovated and renamed August Wilson Park.

In 2020, the University Library System at the University of Pittsburgh acquired Wilson's literary papers and materials to establish the August Wilson Archive.

In 2021, the United States Postal Service honored Wilson with a Forever stamp featuring him as part of the Black Heritage series of stamps. It was designed by Ethel Kessler with art from Tim O'Brien.

On January 7, 2025, Wilson received a star on the Hollywood Walk of Fame.

Harold Bloom included two of Wilson's most famous plays, Fences and Joe Turner's Come and Gone, on his list of works constituting the Western Canon. Playwright a. k. payne has cited Wilson as inspiration for their work.

Other awards and honors by year:

- 1985: New York Drama Critics' Circle Award for Best American Play Ma Rainey's Black Bottom
- 1986: Whiting Award for Drama
- 1986: Guggenheim Fellowship for Drama & Performance Art
- 1987: Artist of the Year by Chicago Tribune
- 1988: Literary Lion Award from the New York Public Library
- 1988: Golden Plate Award of the American Academy of Achievement
- 1988: New York Drama Critics Circle Award for Best Play – Joe Turner's Come and Gone
- 1990: Governor's Awards for Excellence in the Arts and Distinguished Pennsylvania Artists
- 1990: New York Drama Critics Circle Award for Best Play – The Piano Lesson
- 1991: Black Filmmakers Hall of Fame award
- 1991: St. Louis Literary Award from the Saint Louis University Library Associates
- 1992: American Theatre Critics' Association Award – Two Trains Running
- 1992, 2007: New York Drama Critics Circle Citation for Best American Play – Two Trains Running
- 1992: Clarence Muse Award
- 1996: New York Drama Critics Circle Award for Best Play – Seven Guitars
- 1999: National Humanities Medal
- 2000: New York Drama Critics Circle Award for Best Play – Jitney
- 2001: Outer Critics Circle Award for John Gassner Playwriting Award – Fences
- 2002: Olivier Award for Best new Play – Jitney
- 2004: The 10th Annual Heinz Award in Arts and Humanities
- 2004: The U.S. Comedy Arts Festival Freedom of Speech Award
- 2005: Make Shift Award at the U.S. Confederation of Play Writers
- 2006: American Theater Hall of Fame.
- 2013: Lucille Lortel Award for Outstanding Revival – The Piano Lesson
