= List of black Tony Award winners and nominees =

This is a list of Black creatives who have been nominated for a Tony Award for outstanding achievement in Broadway theatre.

While some American people of African ancestry prefer "Black," and others prefer "African American"; "African American" is considered a less appropriate umbrella term for people of African ancestry worldwide because it obscures other ethnicities or national origins. Thus, "Black" is a more inclusive umbrella term.

== Facts and figures ==
=== Multiple nominations ===
As of 2026 ceremony:

- George C. Wolfe – 24
- LaChanze – 11
- Audra McDonald – 11
- Paul Tazewell – 11
- August Wilson – 9
- Kenny Leon – 8
- Stephen Byrd – 7
- Rashad V. Chambers – 7
- Harold Wheeler – 7
- Dede Ayite – 6
- Alia Jones-Harvey – 6
- Lloyd Richards – 6
- Ron Simons – 6
- Emilio Sosa – 6
- Camille A. Brown – 5
- Gregory Hines – 5
- Bill T. Jones – 5
- Debra Martin Chase – 5
- Donald McKayle – 5
- Lamar Richardson – 5
- Diane Scott Carter – 5
- André De Shields – 4
- Brandon Victor Dixon – 4
- Savion Glover – 4
- David Alan Grier – 4
- Joshua Henry – 4
- Allen Lee Hughes – 4
- Toni-Leslie James – 4
- James Earl Jones – 4
- Brian Stokes Mitchell – 4
- Brian Moreland - 4
- Mbongeni Ngema – 4
- Condola Rashad – 4
- Phylicia Rashad – 4
- Ruben Santiago-Hudson – 4
- Stew – 4
- Daryl Waters – 4
- Kara Young – 4
- Hilton Battle – 3
- Vinnette Carroll – 3
- Viola Davis – 3
- Justin Ellington – 3
- Cynthia Erivo – 3
- Irene Gandy - 3
- Micki Grant – 3
- Jeremy O. Harris – 3
- Geoffrey Holder – 3
- Henry LeTang – 3
- Lynn Nottage – 3
- Leslie Odom, Jr. – 3
- Wendell Pierce – 3
- Tonya Pinkins – 3
- Jeremy Pope – 3
- Gilbert Price – 3
- LaTanya Richardson Jackson - 3
- Melvin Van Peebles – 3
- Courtney B. Vance – 3
- Saheem Ali – 2
- Mary Alice – 2
- Debbie Allen – 2
- Gretha Boston – 2
- Charles Brown – 2
- RuPaul Charles – 2
- Chuck Cooper – 2
- Jordan E. Cooper – 2
- Cleavant Derricks – 2
- Colman Domingo – 2
- Ann Duquesnay – 2
- Charles S. Dutton – 2
- George Faison – 2
- Laurence Fishburne – 2
- K. Todd Freeman – 2
- Whoopi Goldberg – 2
- Corey Hawkins – 2
- Luther Henderson – 2
- Stephen McKinley Henderson – 2
- Jon Michael Hill – 2
- Linda Hopkins – 2
- James Monroe Iglehart – 2
- Ernestine Jackson – 2
- Michael R. Jackson – 2
- Samuel L. Jackson - 2
- Branden Jacobs-Jenkins - 2
- Nikki M. James – 2
- Qween Jean – 2
- Quincy Jones – 2
- Joaquina Kalukango – 2
- John Kani – 2
- Eartha Kitt – 2
- John Legend – 2
- Adriane Lenox – 2
- Claudia McNeil – 2
- S. Epatha Merkerson – 2
- Patina Miller – 2
- Zakes Mokae – 2
- Dominique Morisseau - 2
- Sahr Ngaujah – 2
- Winston Ntshona – 2
- Sophie Okonedo – 2
- Billy Porter – 2
- Josephine Premice – 2
- Vivian Reed – 2
- Roger Robinson – 2
- Anika Noni Rose – 2
- Diana Sands – 2
- Anna Deavere Smith – 2
- Mikaal Sulaiman – 2
- Ron Taylor – 2
- Lynne Thigpen – 2
- Tamara Tunie – 2
- Leslie Uggams – 2
- Ben Vereen – 2
- Lena Waithe – 2
- Adrienne Warren – 2
- Kerry Washington – 2
- Denzel Washington – 2
- Jason Michael Webb – 2
- Lillias White – 2
- Whitney White – 2
- Dick Anthony Williams – 2
- Billy Wilson – 2
- Oprah Winfrey – 2
- Jeffrey Wright – 2
- Samuel E. Wright – 2

=== Multiple wins ===
As of 2026 ceremony:

- Audra McDonald – 6
- LaChanze – 5
- George C. Wolfe – 5
- Debra Martin Chase – 4
- Ron Simons – 4
- Hinton Battle – 3
- Rashad V. Chambers – 3
- Lamar Richardson - 3
- James Earl Jones – 3
- Viola Davis – 2
- Geoffrey Holder – 2
- Branden Jacobs-Jenkins - 2
- Bill T. Jones – 2
- Billy Porter – 2
- Phylicia Rashad – 2
- Paul Tazewell – 2
- Kara Young – 2

== Book of a Musical ==
Tony Award for Best Book of a Musical
| Year | Nominee | Show | Result |
|---|---|---|---|
| 1972 | Melvin Van Peebles | Ain't Supposed to Die a Natural Death | Nominated |
| 1973 | Melvin Van Peebles | Don't Play Us Cheap | Nominated |
| 1973 | Micki Grant | Don't Bother Me, I Can't Cope | Nominated |
| 1977 | Vinnette Carroll | Your Arms Too Short to Box with God | Nominated |
| 1992 | Clarke Peters | Five Guys Named Moe | Nominated |
| 1992 | George C. Wolfe | Jelly's Last Jam | Nominated |
| 1996 | Reg E. Gaines | Bring in 'Da Noise, Bring in 'Da Funk | Nominated |
| 1999 | Ron Taylor, Lita Gaithers, Charles Bevel | It Ain't Nothin' But the Blues | Nominated |
| 2000 | George C. Wolfe | The Wild Party | Nominated |
| 2008 | Stew | Passing Strange | Won |
| 2010 | Bill T. Jones | Fela! | Nominated |
| 2016 | George C. Wolfe | Shuffle Along, or, the Making of the Musical Sensation of 1921 and All That Followed | Nominated |
| 2019 | Dominique Morisseau | Ain’t Too Proud – The Life and Times of the Temptations | Nominated |
| 2020 | Katori Hall | Tina - The Tina Turner Musical | Nominated |
| 2022 | Lynn Nottage | MJ | Nominated |
| 2022 | Christina Anderson | Paradise Square | Nominated |
| 2022 | Michael R. Jackson | A Strange Loop | Won |
| 2023 | Sharon Washington | New York, New York | Nominated |
| 2023 | Amber Ruffin | Some Like It Hot | Nominated |

== Choreography ==
Tony Award for Best Choreography
| Year | Nominee | Show | Result |
|---|---|---|---|
| 1965 | Donald McKayle | Golden Boy | Nominated |
| 1970 | Louis Johnson | Purlie | Nominated |
| 1974 | Donald McKayle | Raisin | Nominated |
| 1975 | Donald McKayle | Doctor Jazz | Nominated |
| 1975 | George Faison | The Wiz | Won |
| 1976 | Billy Wilson | Bubbling Brown Sugar | Nominated |
| 1977 | Talley Beatty | Your Arms Too Short to Box with God | Nominated |
| 1979 | Henry LeTang and Billy Wilson | Eubie! | Nominated |
| 1981 | Henry LeTang and Donald McKayle | Sophisticated Ladies | Nominated |
| 1983 | George Faison | Porgy and Bess | Nominated |
| 1988 | Ndaba Mhlongo and Mbongeni Ngema | Sarafina! | Nominated |
| 1989 | Cholly Atkins, Henry LeTang, Frankie Manning, and Fayard Nicholas | Black and Blue | Won |
| 1992 | Hope Clarke, Ted L. Levy, and Gregory Hines | Jelly's Last Jam | Nominated |
| 1996 | Savion Glover | Bring in 'da Noise, Bring in 'da Funk | Won |
| 2006 | Donald Byrd | The Color Purple | Nominated |
| 2007 | Bill T. Jones | Spring Awakening | Won |
| 2010 | Bill T. Jones | Fela! | Won |
| 2016 | Savion Glover | Shuffle Along, or, the Making of the Musical Sensation of 1921 and All That Followed | Nominated |
| 2019 | Camille A. Brown | Choir Boy | Nominated |
| 2022 | Camille A. Brown | for colored girls who have considered suicide/when the rainbow is enuf | Nominated |
| 2022 | Bill T. Jones | Paradise Square | Nominated |
| 2024 | Camille A. Brown | Hell's Kitchen | Nominated |
| 2025 | Camille A. Brown | Gypsy | Nominated |
| 2026 | Arturo Lyons, Omari Wiles | Cats: The Jellicle Ball | Won |

== Costume Design ==
Tony Award for Best Costume Design
| Year | Nominee | Show | Result |
|---|---|---|---|
| 1975 | Geoffrey Holder | The Wiz | Won |
| 1978 | Geoffrey Holder | Timbuktu! | Nominated |
| 1991 | Judy Dearing | Once on This Island | Nominated |
| 1992 | Toni-Leslie James | Jelly's Last Jam | Nominated |
| 1996 | Paul Tazewell | Bring in 'da Noise, Bring in 'da Funk | Nominated |

== Costume Design of a Musical ==
Tony Award for Best Costume Design of a Musical
| Year | Nominee | Show | Result |
|---|---|---|---|
| 2006 | Paul Tazewell | The Color Purple | Nominated |
| 2008 | Paul Tazewell | In the Heights | Nominated |
| 2010 | Paul Tazewell | Memphis | Nominated |
| 2012 | Emilio Sosa | The Gershwins' Porgy and Bess | Nominated |
| 2016 | Paul Tazewell | Hamilton | Won |
| 2019 | Paul Tazewell | Ain’t Too Proud – The Life and Times of the Temptations | Nominated |
| 2022 | Toni-Leslie James | Paradise Square | Nominated |
| 2022 | Paul Tazewell | MJ | Nominated |
| 2024 | Dede Ayite | Hell's Kitchen | Nominated |
| 2024 | Paul Tazewell | Suffs | Nominated |
| 2025 | Dede Ayite | Buena Vista Social Club | Nominated |
| 2025 | Paul Tazewell | Death Becomes Her | Won |
| 2026 | Qween Jean | Cats: The Jellicle Ball | Won |

== Costume Design of a Play ==
Tony Award for Best Costume Design of a Play
| Year | Nominee | Show | Result |
|---|---|---|---|
| 2012 | Paul Tazewell | A Streetcar Named Desire | Nominated |
| 2017 | Toni-Leslie James | August Wilson's Jitney | Nominated |
| 2019 | Toni-Leslie James | Bernhardt/Hamlet | Nominated |
| 2020 | Dede Ayite | Slave Play | Nominated |
| 2020 | Dede Ayite | A Soldier's Play | Nominated |
| 2022 | Sarafina Bush | for colored girls who have considered suicide/when the rainbow is enuf | Nominated |
| 2022 | Emilio Sosa | Trouble in Mind | Nominated |
| 2023 | Dominique Fawn Hill | Fat Ham | Nominated |
| 2023 | Emilio Sosa | Ain't No Mo' | Nominated |
| 2023 | Emilio Sosa | Good Night, Oscar | Nominated |
| 2024 | Dede Ayite | Appropriate | Nominated |
| 2024 | Dede Ayite | Jaja's African Hair Braiding | Won |
| 2024 | Emilio Sosa | Purlie Victorious: A Non-Confederate Romp Through the Cotton Patch | Nominated |
| 2026 | Qween Jean | Liberation | Nominated |
| 2026 | Emilio Sosa | The Balusters | Nominated |
| 2026 | Paul Tazewell | August Wilson's Joe Turner’s Come and Gone | Nominated |

== Direction of a Musical ==
Tony Award for Best Direction of a Musical
| Year | Nominee | Show | Result |
|---|---|---|---|
| 1972 | Gilbert Moses | Ain't Supposed to Die a Natural Death | Nominated |
| 1973 | Vinnette Carroll | Don't Bother Me, I Can't Cope | Nominated |
| 1974 | Donald McKayle | Raisin | Nominated |
| 1975 | Geoffrey Holder | The Wiz | Won |
| 1977 | Vinnette Carroll | Your Arms Too Short to Box with God | Nominated |
| 1988 | Mbongeni Ngema | Sarafina! | Nominated |
| 1992 | George C. Wolfe | Jelly's Last Jam | Nominated |
| 1996 | George C. Wolfe | Bring in 'da Noise, Bring in 'da Funk | Won |
| 2004 | George C. Wolfe | Caroline, or Change | Nominated |
| 2010 | Bill T. Jones | Fela! | Nominated |
| 2016 | George C. Wolfe | Shuffle Along, or, the Making of the Musical Sensation of 1921 and All That Followed | Nominated |
| 2025 | Saheem Ali | Buena Vista Social Club | Nominated |
| 2026 | Zhailon Levingston | Cats: The Jellicle Ball | Won |

== Direction of a Play ==
Tony Award for Best Direction of a Play
| Year | Nominee | Show | Result |
|---|---|---|---|
| 1960 | Lloyd Richards | A Raisin in the Sun | Nominated |
| 1987 | Mbongeni Ngema | Asinamali! | Nominated |
| 1987 | Lloyd Richards | Fences | Won |
| 1988 | Lloyd Richards | Joe Turner's Come and Gone | Nominated |
| 1990 | Lloyd Richards | The Piano Lesson | Nominated |
| 1993 | George C. Wolfe | Angels in America: Millennium Approaches | Won |
| 1994 | George C. Wolfe | Angels in America: Perestroika | Nominated |
| 1996 | Lloyd Richards | Seven Guitars | Nominated |
| 2001 | Marion McClinton | King Hedley II | Nominated |
| 2010 | Kenny Leon | Fences | Nominated |
| 2011 | George C. Wolfe | The Normal Heart | Nominated |
| 2013 | George C. Wolfe | Lucky Guy | Nominated |
| 2014 | Kenny Leon | A Raisin in the Sun | Won |
| 2016 | Liesl Tommy | Eclipsed | Nominated |
| 2017 | Ruben Santiago-Hudson | August Wilson's Jitney | Nominated |
| 2018 | George C. Wolfe | Eugene O'Neill's The Iceman Cometh | Nominated |
| 2019 | George C. Wolfe | Gary: A Sequel to Titus Andronicus | Nominated |
| 2020 | Kenny Leon | A Soldier's Play | Nominated |
| 2020 | Robert O'Hara | Slave Play | Nominated |
| 2022 | Lileana Blain-Cruz | The Skin of Our Teeth | Nominated |
| 2022 | Camille A. Brown | for colored girls who have considered suicide/when the rainbow is enuf | Nominated |
| 2023 | Saheem Ali | Fat Ham | Nominated |
| 2023 | Stevie Walker-Webb | Ain't No Mo' | Nominated |
| 2024 | Kenny Leon | Purlie Victorious: A Non-Confederate Romp Through the Cotton Patch | Nominated |
| 2024 | Whitney White | Jaja's African Hair Braiding | Nominated |
| 2026 | Kenny Leon | The Balusters | Nominated |
| 2026 | Whitney White | Liberation | Nominated |

== Excellence in Theatre Education Award ==
Excellence in Theatre Education
| Year | Nominee | School | Result |
|---|---|---|---|
| 2015 | Corey Mitchell | Northwest School of the Arts in Charlotte, N.C. | Won |
| 2016 | Marilyn McCormick | Cass Technical High School in Detroit, MI | Won |
| 2022 | Roshunda Jones-Koumba | G. W. Carver Magnet High School in Houston, Texas | Won |
| 2024 | CJay Philip | Dance & BMore in Baltimore, MD | Won |
| 2025 | Gary Edwin Robinson | Boys and Girls High School in Brooklyn, N.Y. | Won |

== Lighting Design ==
Tony Award for Best Lighting Design
| Year | Nominee | Show | Result |
|---|---|---|---|
| 1983 | Allen Lee Hughes | K2 | Nominated |
| 1985 | Allen Lee Hughes | Strange Interlude | Nominated |
| 1991 | Allen Lee Hughes | Once on This Island | Nominated |

== Lighting Design in a Play ==
Tony Award for Best Lighting Design in a Play
| Year | Nominee | Show | Result |
|---|---|---|---|
| 2020 | Allen Lee Hughes | A Soldier's Play | Nominated |
| 2026 | Stacey Derosier | August Wilson's Joe Turner’s Come and Gone | Nominated |

== Musical ==
Tony Award for Best Musical
| Year | Nominee | Show | Result |
|---|---|---|---|
| 1975 | Ken Harper (as producer) | The Wiz | Won |
| 1996 | George C. Wolfe (as producer) | Bring in 'da Noise, Bring in 'da Funk | Nominated |
| 2000 | George C. Wolfe (as producer) | The Wild Party | Nominated |
| 2002 | Whoopi Goldberg (as producer) | Thoroughly Modern Millie | Won |
| 2004 | George C. Wolfe (as producer) | Caroline, or Change | Nominated |
| 2006 | Oprah Winfrey (as producer), Quincy Jones (as producer) | The Color Purple | Nominated |
| 2007 | Tamara Tunie (as producer) | Spring Awakening | Won |
| 2010 | Shawn "Jay-Z" Carter (as producer), Will Smith (as producer), Jada Pinkett Smith (as producer) | Fela! | Nominated |
| 2011 | Whoopi Goldberg (as producer) | Sister Act | Nominated |
| 2014 | Wynton Marsalis (as producer) | After Midnight | Nominated |
| 2014 | Ron Simons (as producer) | A Gentleman's Guide to Love & Murder | Won |
| 2019 | Stephen Byrd (as producer), Rashad V. Chambers (as producer), Alia Jones (as producer), Ron Simons (as producer) | Ain’t Too Proud – The Life and Times of the Temptations | Nominated |
| 2020 | Tina Turner (as producer) | Tina - The Tina Turner Musical | Nominated |
| 2022 | Stephen C. Byrd (as producer) | MJ | Nominated |
| 2022 | Sheila C. Johnson (as producer) | Paradise Square | Nominated |
| 2022 | RuPaul Charles (as producer), Debra Martin Chase (as producer), Don Cheadle (as producer), Robyn Coles, Bridgid Coulter Cheadle (as producer), Jennifer Hudson (as producer), Billy Porter (as producer), Cody Renard Richard (as producer), Tre’ Scott (as producer), Zach Stafford (as producer), Paul Oakley Stovall (as producer) | A Strange Loop | Won |
| 2023 | LaChanze (as producer) | Kimberly Akimbo | Won |
| 2023 | Ron Simons (as producer), Lamar Richardson (as producer), Christen James (as producer), Dale Mott (as producer), Gregory Carroll (as producer) | New York, New York | Nominated |
| 2023 | Mariah Carey (as producer), Kenny Leon (as producer) | Some Like It Hot | Nominated |
| 2024 | LaChanze (as producer), Debra Martin Chase (as producer) | The Outsiders | Won |
| 2024 | Diane Scott Carter (as producer) | Suffs | Nominated |
| 2025 | LaChanze (as producer) | Buena Vista Social Club | Nominated |
| 2025 | Debra Martin Chase (as producer) | Death Becomes Her | Nominated |
| 2026 | Ayesha Curry (as producer), Stephen Curry (as producer) | The Lost Boys | Nominated |
| 2026 | Deborah Cox (as producer) | Titanique | Nominated |

== Orchestrations ==
Tony Award for Best Orchestrations
| Year | Nominee | Show | Result |
|---|---|---|---|
| 1997 | Luther Henderson | Play On! | Nominated |
| 1997 | Harold Wheeler | The Life | Nominated |
| 1999 | Harold Wheeler | Little Me | Nominated |
| 2000 | Harold Wheeler | Swing! | Nominated |
| 2001 | Harold Wheeler | The Full Monty | Nominated |
| 2003 | Harold Wheeler | Hairspray | Nominated |
| 2005 | Harold Wheeler | Dirty Rotten Scoundrels | Nominated |
| 2008 | Stew | Passing Strange | Nominated |
| 2010 | Daryl Waters | Memphis | Won |
| 2016 | Daryl Waters | Shuffle Along, or, the Making of the Musical Sensation of 1921 and All That Followed | Nominated |
| 2019 | Harold Wheeler | Ain’t Too Proud – The Life and Times of the Temptations | Nominated |
| 2022 | Jason Michael Webb | MJ | Nominated |
| 2023 | Daryl Waters | New York, New York | Nominated |
| 2023 | Bryan Carter | Some Like It Hot | Won |
| 2024 | Adam Blackstone | Hell's Kitchen | Nominated |

== Original Score (Music and/or Lyrics) Written for the Theatre ==
Tony Award for Best Original Score (Music and/or Lyrics) Written for the Theatre
| Year | Nominee | Show | Result |
|---|---|---|---|
| 1972 | Melvin Van Peebles | Ain't Supposed to Die a Natural Death | Nominated |
| 1973 | Micki Grant | Don't Bother Me, I Can't Cope | Nominated |
| 1975 | Charlie Smalls | The Wiz | Won |
| 1976 | Scott Joplin | Treemonisha | Nominated |
| 1978 | Micki Grant | Working | Nominated |
| 1979 | Eubie Blake, Noble Sissle, Andy Razaf, F. E. Miller, and Jim Europe | Eubie! | Nominated |
| 1988 | Mbongeni Ngema and Hugh Masekela | Sarafina! | Nominated |
| 1992 | Luther Henderson, Jelly Roll Morton | Jelly's Last Jam | Nominated |
| 1996 | Ann Duquesnay, Reg E. Gaines, Zane Mark, Daryl Waters, George C. Wolfe | Bring in 'da Noise, Bring in 'da Funk | Nominated |
| 2006 | Stephen Bray, Brenda Russell | The Color Purple | Nominated |
| 2008 | Stew | Passing Strange | Nominated |
| 2010 | Branford Marsalis | Fences | Nominated |
| 2018 | Yolanda Adams, John Legend, T.I., Domani & Lil' C | SpongeBob SquarePants: The Musical | Nominated |
| 2020 | Jason Michael Webb | The Rose Tattoo | Nominated |
| 2022 | Masi Asare | Paradise Square | Nominated |
| 2022 | Michael R. Jackson | A Strange Loop | Nominated |

== Performance by an Actor in a Featured Role in a Musical ==
Tony Award for Best Performance by an Actor in a Featured Role in a Musical
| Year | Nominee | Show | Result | Milestone |
|---|---|---|---|---|
| 1954 | Harry Belafonte | John Murray Anderson's Almanac | Won | First African-American male winner |
| 1958 | Ossie Davis | Jamaica | Nominated | |
| 1967 | Leon Bibb | A Hand Is on the Gate | Nominated | |
| 1972 | Ben Vereen | Jesus Christ Superstar | Nominated | |
| 1973 | Avon Long | Don't Play Us Cheap | Nominated | |
| 1973 | Gilbert Price | Lost in the Stars | Nominated | |
| 1974 | Ralph Carter | Raisin | Nominated | |
| 1975 | Ted Ross | The Wiz | Won | |
| 1975 | Gilbert Price | The Night That Made America Famous | Nominated | |
| 1977 | Larry Marshall | Porgy and Bess | Nominated | |
| 1979 | Gregory Hines | Eubie! | Nominated | |
| 1981 | Hinton Battle | Sophisticated Ladies | Won | |
| 1982 | Cleavant Derricks | Dreamgirls | Won | |
| 1982 | Obba Babatundé | Dreamgirls | Nominated | |
| 1982 | David Alan Grier | The First | Nominated | |
| 1984 | Hinton Battle | The Tap Dance Kid | Won | With this win, first African-American to win 2 Tonys. |
| 1984 | Samuel E. Wright | The Tap Dance Kid | Nominated | |
| 1985 | Ron Richardson | Big River | Won | |
| 1989 | Bunny Briggs | Black and Blue | Nominated | |
| 1989 | Savion Glover | Black and Blue | Nominated | |
| 1991 | Hinton Battle | Miss Saigon | Won | With this win, first African-American to win 3 Tonys. |
| 1991 | Gregg Burge | Oh, Kay! | Nominated | |
| 1992 | Keith David | Jelly's Last Jam | Nominated | |
| 1995 | Michel Bell | Show Boat | Nominated | |
| 1995 | Victor Trent Cook | Smokey Joe's Café | Nominated | |
| 1997 | Chuck Cooper | The Life | Won | |
| 1997 | André De Shields | Play On! | Nominated | |
| 1998 | Samuel E. Wright | The Lion King | Nominated | |
| 1999 | Desmond Richardson | Fosse | Nominated | |
| 1999 | Ron Taylor | It Ain't Nothin' But the Blues | Nominated | |
| 2001 | André De Shields | The Full Monty | Nominated | |
| 2003 | Corey Reynolds | Hairspray | Nominated | |
| 2004 | Michael McElroy | Big River | Nominated | |
| 2006 | Brandon Victor Dixon | The Color Purple | Nominated | |
| 2008 | Daniel Breaker | Passing Strange | Nominated | |
| 2011 | Colman Domingo | The Scottsboro Boys | Nominated | |
| 2011 | Forrest McClendon | The Scottsboro Boys | Nominated | |
| 2012 | David Alan Grier | The Gershwins' Porgy and Bess | Nominated | |
| 2012 | Phillip Boykin | The Gershwins' Porgy and Bess | Nominated | |
| 2013 | Charl Brown | Motown: The Musical | Nominated | |
| 2014 | Joshua Henry | Violet | Nominated | |
| 2014 | James Monroe Iglehart | Aladdin | Won | |
| 2016 | Daveed Diggs | Hamilton | Won | |
| 2016 | Christopher Jackson | Hamilton | Nominated | |
| 2016 | Brandon Victor Dixon | Shuffle Along, Or The Making of the Musical Sensation of 1921 and All That Followed | Nominated | |
| 2019 | André De Shields | Hadestown | Won | |
| 2019 | Jeremy Pope | Ain’t Too Proud – The Life and Times of the Temptations | Nominated | |
| 2019 | Ephraim Sykes | Ain’t Too Proud – The Life and Times of the Temptations | Nominated | |
| 2020 | Sahr Ngaujah | Moulin Rouge! The Musical | Nominated | |
| 2020 | Daniel J. Watts | Tina - The Tina Turner Musical | Nominated | |
| 2022 | Sidney DuPont | Paradise Square | Nominated | |
| 2022 | Jared Grimes | Funny Girl | Nominated | |
| 2022 | John-Andrew Morrison | A Strange Loop | Nominated | |
| 2023 | Justin Cooley | Kimberly Akimbo | Nominated | |
| 2023 | Jordan Donica | Lerner & Loewe's Camelot | Nominated | |
| 2023 | Alex Newell | Shucked | Won | |
| 2024 | Joshua Boone | The Outsiders | Nominated | |
| 2024 | Sky Lakota-Lynch | The Outsiders | Nominated | |
| 2024 | Brandon Victor Dixon | Hell's Kitchen | Nominated | |
| 2026 | André De Shields | Cats: The Jellicle Ball | Nominated | |
| 2026 | Layton Williams | Titanique | Nominated | |

== Performance by an Actor in a Featured Role in a Play ==
Tony Award for Best Performance by an Actor in a Featured Role in a Play
| Year | Nominee | Show | Result |
|---|---|---|---|
| 1962 | Godfrey M. Cambridge | Purlie Victorious | Nominated |
| 1963 | Frank Silvera | The Lady of the Camellias | Nominated |
| 1965 | Clarence Williams III | Slow Dance on the Killing Ground | Nominated |
| 1974 | Douglas Turner Ward | The River Niger | Nominated |
| 1974 | Dick Anthony Williams | What the Wine-Sellers Buy | Nominated |
| 1975 | Dick Anthony Williams | Black Picture Show | Nominated |
| 1978 | Morgan Freeman | The Mighty Gents | Nominated |
| 1980 | Earle Hyman | The Lady from Dubuque | Nominated |
| 1982 | Zakes Mokae | Master Harold...and the Boys | Won |
| 1985 | Charles S. Dutton | Ma Rainey's Black Bottom | Nominated |
| 1987 | Frankie R. Faison | Fences | Nominated |
| 1987 | Courtney B. Vance | Fences | Nominated |
| 1988 | Delroy Lindo | Joe Turner's Come and Gone | Nominated |
| 1992 | Laurence Fishburne | Two Trains Running | Won |
| 1992 | Roscoe Lee Browne | Two Trains Running | Nominated |
| 1993 | Zakes Mokae | The Song of Jacob Zulu | Nominated |
| 1994 | Jeffrey Wright | Angels in America: Perestroika | Won |
| 1996 | Ruben Santiago-Hudson | Seven Guitars | Won |
| 1996 | Roger Robinson | Seven Guitars | Nominated |
| 2001 | Charles Brown | King Hedley II | Nominated |
| 2003 | Thomas Jefferson Byrd | Ma Rainey's Black Bottom | Nominated |
| 2003 | Daniel Sunjata | Take Me Out | Nominated |
| 2007 | Anthony Chisholm | Radio Golf | Nominated |
| 2007 | John Earl Jelks | Radio Golf | Nominated |
| 2009 | Roger Robinson | Joe Turner's Come and Gone | Won |
| 2010 | David Alan Grier | Race | Nominated |
| 2010 | Stephen McKinley Henderson | Fences | Nominated |
| 2010 | Jon Michael Hill | Superior Donuts | Nominated |
| 2013 | Courtney B. Vance | Lucky Guy | Won |
| 2015 | K. Todd Freeman | Airline Highway | Nominated |
| 2017 | John Douglas Thompson | August Wilson's Jitney | Nominated |
| 2018 | Brian Tyree Henry | Lobby Hero | Nominated |
| 2020 | Ato Blankson-Wood | Slave Play | Nominated |
| 2020 | David Alan Grier | A Soldier's Play | Won |
| 2022 | Chuck Cooper | Trouble in Mind | Nominated |
| 2022 | Ron Cephas Jones | Clyde's | Nominated |
| 2022 | Jesse Williams | Take Me Out | Nominated |
| 2023 | Jordan E. Cooper | Ain't No Mo' | Nominated |
| 2023 | Samuel L. Jackson | August Wilson's The Piano Lesson | Nominated |
| 2025 | Glenn Davis | Purpose | Nominated |
| 2026 | Brandon J. Dirden | Waiting For Godot | Nominated |
| 2026 | Ruben Santiago-Hudson | August Wilson's Joe Turner’s Come and Gone | Nominated |

== Performance by an Actor in a Leading Role in a Musical ==
Tony Award for Best Performance by an Actor in a Leading Role in a Musical
| Year | Nominee | Show | Result |
|---|---|---|---|
| 1965 | Sammy Davis | Golden Boy | Nominated |
| 1968 | Robert Hooks | Hallelujah, Baby! | Nominated |
| 1970 | Cleavon Little | Purlie | Won |
| 1972 | Clifton Davis | Two Gentlemen of Verona | Nominated |
| 1973 | Brock Peters | Lost in the Stars | Nominated |
| 1973 | Ben Vereen | Pippin | Won |
| 1974 | Joe Morton | Raisin | Nominated |
| 1977 | Robert Guillaume | Guys and Dolls | Nominated |
| 1978 | Gilbert Price | Timbuktu! | Nominated |
| 1980 | Gregory Hines | Comin' Uptown | Nominated |
| 1981 | Gregory Hines | Sophisticated Ladies | Nominated |
| 1982 | Ben Harney | Dreamgirls | Won |
| 1983 | Al Green | Your Arms Too Short to Box with God | Nominated |
| 1983 | Michael V. Smartt | Porgy and Bess | Nominated |
| 1986 | Cleavant Derricks | Big Deal | Nominated |
| 1986 | Maurice Hines | Uptown...It's Hot! | Nominated |
| 1992 | Gregory Hines | Jelly's Last Jam | Won |
| 1996 | Savion Glover | Bring in 'da Noise, Bring in 'da Funk | Nominated |
| 1998 | Brian Stokes Mitchell | Ragtime | Nominated |
| 2000 | Brian Stokes Mitchell | Kiss Me, Kate | Won |
| 2003 | Brian Stokes Mitchell | Man of La Mancha | Nominated |
| 2008 | Stew | Passing Strange | Nominated |
| 2010 | Sahr Ngaujah | Fela! | Nominated |
| 2011 | Joshua Henry | The Scottsboro Boys | Nominated |
| 2012 | Norm Lewis | The Gershwins' Porgy and Bess | Nominated |
| 2013 | Billy Porter | Kinky Boots | Won |
| 2016 | Leslie Odom Jr. | Hamilton | Won |
| 2018 | Joshua Henry | Rodgers & Hammerstein's Carousel | Nominated |
| 2019 | Derrick Baskin | Ain’t Too Proud – The Life and Times of the Temptations | Nominated |
| 2022 | Myles Frost | MJ | Won |
| 2022 | Jaquel Spivey | A Strange Loop | Nominated |
| 2023 | J. Harrison Ghee | Some Like It Hot | Won |
| 2024 | Dorian Harewood | The Notebook | Nominated |
| 2025 | James Monroe Iglehart | A Wonderful World: The Louis Armstrong Musical | Nominated |
| 2026 | Nicholas Christopher | Chess | Nominated |
| 2026 | Joshua Henry | Ragtime | Won |

== Performance by an Actor in a Leading Role in a Play ==
Tony Award for Best Performance by an Actor in a Leading Role in a Play
| Year | Nominee | Show | Result |
|---|---|---|---|
| 1960 | Sidney Poitier | A Raisin in the Sun | Nominated |
| 1969 | James Earl Jones | The Great White Hope | Won |
| 1975 | John Kani and Winston Ntshona | Sizwe Banzi is Dead / The Island | Won |
| 1976 | Moses Gunn | The Poison Tree | Nominated |
| 1980 | Charles Brown | Home | Nominated |
| 1984 | Calvin Levels | Open Admissions | Nominated |
| 1987 | James Earl Jones | Fences | Won |
| 1990 | Charles S. Dutton | The Piano Lesson | Nominated |
| 1991 | Courtney B. Vance | Six Degrees of Separation | Nominated |
| 1993 | K. Todd Freeman | The Song of Jacob Zulu | Nominated |
| 2001 | Brian Stokes Mitchell | King Hedley II | Nominated |
| 2002 | Jeffrey Wright | Topdog/Underdog | Nominated |
| 2005 | James Earl Jones | On Golden Pond | Nominated |
| 2008 | Laurence Fishburne | Thurgood | Nominated |
| 2010 | Denzel Washington | Fences | Won |
| 2012 | James Earl Jones | Gore Vidal's The Best Man | Nominated |
| 2017 | Corey Hawkins | John Guare's Six Degrees of Separation | Nominated |
| 2018 | Denzel Washington | Eugene O'Neill's The Iceman Cometh | Nominated |
| 2019 | Jeremy Pope | Choir Boy | Nominated |
| 2020 | Blair Underwood | A Soldier's Play | Nominated |
| 2022 | Adrian Lester | The Lehman Trilogy | Nominated |
| 2022 | Ruben Santiago-Hudson | Lackawanna Blues | Nominated |
| 2023 | Yahya Abdul-Mateen II | Suzan-Lori Parks' Topdog/Underdog | Nominated |
| 2023 | Corey Hawkins | Suzan-Lori Parks' Topdog/Underdog | Nominated |
| 2023 | Stephen McKinley Henderson | Between Riverside and Crazy | Nominated |
| 2023 | Wendell Pierce | Arthur Miller's Death of a Salesman | Nominated |
| 2024 | William Jackson Harper | Uncle Vanya | Nominated |
| 2024 | Leslie Odom Jr. | Purlie Victorious: A Non-Confederate Romp Through the Cotton Patch | Nominated |
| 2025 | Jon Michael Hill | Purpose | Nominated |
| 2025 | Harry Lennix | Purpose | Nominated |

== Performance by an Actress in a Featured Role in a Musical ==
Tony Award for Best Performance by an Actress in a Featured Role in a Musical
| Year | Nominee | Show | Result | Milestone |
|---|---|---|---|---|
| 1950 | Juanita Hall | South Pacific | Won | First African-American Tony winner. First African-American Tony female winner. |
| 1958 | Josephine Premice | Jamaica | Nominated | |
| 1967 | Josephine Premice | A Hand Is on the Gate | Nominated | |
| 1968 | Lillian Hayman | Hallelujah, Baby! | Won | |
| 1970 | Melba Moore | Purlie | Won | |
| 1972 | Linda Hopkins | Inner City | Won | |
| 1972 | Beatrice Winde | Ain't Supposed to Die a Natural Death | Nominated | |
| 1974 | Ernestine Jackson | Raisin | Nominated | |
| 1975 | Dee Dee Bridgewater | The Wiz | Won | |
| 1977 | Delores Hall | Your Arms Too Short to Box with God | Won | |
| 1978 | Nell Carter | Ain't Misbehavin' | Won | |
| 1978 | Charlayne Woodard | Ain't Misbehavin' | Nominated | |
| 1980 | Debbie Allen | West Side Story | Nominated | |
| 1981 | Phyllis Hyman | Sophisticated Ladies | Nominated | |
| 1981 | Lynne Thigpen | Tintypes | Nominated | |
| 1983 | Karla Burns | Show Boat | Nominated | |
| 1984 | Martine Allard | The Tap Dance Kid | Nominated | |
| 1985 | Leilani Jones | Grind | Won | |
| 1986 | Elisabeth Welch | Jerome Kern Goes to Hollywood | Nominated | |
| 1988 | Leleti Khumalo | Sarafina | Nominated | |
| 1991 | LaChanze | Once on This Island | Nominated | |
| 1992 | Tonya Pinkins | Jelly's Last Jam | Won | |
| 1992 | Vivian Reed | The High Rollers Social and Pleasure Club | Nominated | |
| 1994 | Audra McDonald | Carousel | Won | |
| 1995 | Gretha Boston | Show Boat | Won | |
| 1995 | Brenda Braxton | Smokey Joe's Café | Nominated | |
| 1995 | B.J. Crosby | Smokey Joe's Café | Nominated | |
| 1996 | Ann Duquesnay | Bring in 'da Noise, Bring in 'da Funk | Won | |
| 1997 | Lillias White | The Life | Won | |
| 1998 | Audra McDonald | Ragtime | Won | With this win, first African-American to win twice in this category. |
| 1998 | Tsidii Le Loka | The Lion King | Nominated | |
| 1999 | Gretha Boston | It Ain't Nothin' But the Blues | Nominated | |
| 1999 | Valerie Pettiford | Fosse | Nominated | |
| 2000 | Eartha Kitt | The Wild Party | Nominated | |
| 2004 | Anika Noni Rose | Caroline, or Change | Won | |
| 2006 | Felicia P. Fields | The Color Purple | Nominated | |
| 2006 | Elisabeth Withers-Mendes | The Color Purple | Nominated | |
| 2008 | De'Adre Aziza | Passing Strange | Nominated | |
| 2010 | Karine Plantadit | Come Fly Away | Nominated | |
| 2010 | Lillias White | Fela! | Nominated | |
| 2011 | Nikki M. James | The Book of Mormon | Won | |
| 2012 | Da'Vine Joy Randolph | Ghost the Musical | Nominated | |
| 2014 | Adriane Lenox | After Midnight | Nominated | |
| 2016 | Danielle Brooks | The Color Purple | Nominated | |
| 2016 | Renée Elise Goldsberry | Hamilton | Won | |
| 2016 | Adrienne Warren | Shuffle Along, Or The Making of the Musical Sensation of 1921 and All That Followed | Nominated | |
| 2018 | Ariana DeBose | Summer: The Donna Summer Musical | Nominated | |
| 2019 | Lilli Cooper | Tootsie | Nominated | |
| 2019 | Amber Gray | Hadestown | Nominated | |
| 2020 | Celia Rose Gooding | Jagged Little Pill | Nominated | |
| 2020 | Myra Lucretia Taylor | Tina - The Tina Turner Musical | Nominated | |
| 2022 | Jeannette Bayardelle | Girl from the North Country | Nominated | |
| 2022 | L Morgan Lee | A Strange Loop | Nominated | First transgender actor to be nominated for a Tony. |
| 2023 | NaTasha Yvette Williams | Some Like It Hot | Nominated | |
| 2024 | Amber Iman | Lempicka | Nominated | |
| 2024 | Nikki M. James | Suffs | Nominated | |
| 2024 | Kecia Lewis | Hell's Kitchen | Won | |
| 2025 | Natalie Venetia Belcon | Buena Vista Social Club | Won | |
| 2025 | Joy Woods | Gypsy | Nominated | |
| 2026 | Nichelle Lewis | Ragtime | Nominated | |

== Performance by an Actress in a Featured Role in a Play ==
Tony Award for Best Performance by an Actress in a Featured Role in a Play
| Year | Nominee | Show | Result | Milestone |
|---|---|---|---|---|
| 1964 | Diana Sands | Blues for Mister Charlie | Nominated | |
| 1973 | Maya Angelou | Look Away | Nominated | |
| 1974 | Roxie Roker | The River Niger | Nominated | |
| 1977 | Trazana Beverley | For Colored Girls Who Have Considered Suicide When the Rainbow Is Enuf | Won | |
| 1978 | Starletta DuPois | The Mighty Gents | Nominated | |
| 1985 | Theresa Merritt | Ma Rainey's Black Bottom | Nominated | |
| 1987 | Mary Alice | Fences | Won | |
| 1988 | L. Scott Caldwell | Joe Turner's Come and Gone | Won | |
| 1988 | Kimberleigh Aarn | Joe Turner's Come and Gone | Nominated | |
| 1988 | Kimberly Scott | Joe Turner's Come and Gone | Nominated | |
| 1990 | S. Epatha Merkerson | The Piano Lesson | Nominated | |
| 1992 | Cynthia Martells | Two Trains Running | Nominated | |
| 1996 | Audra McDonald | Master Class | Won | With this win, first African-American to win in both musical and play categories. |
| 1996 | Viola Davis | Seven Guitars | Nominated | |
| 1996 | Michele Shay | Seven Guitars | Nominated | |
| 1997 | Lynne Thigpen | An American Daughter | Won | |
| 2001 | Viola Davis | King Hedley II | Won | |
| 2004 | Audra McDonald | A Raisin in the Sun | Won | With this win, first African American to win 4 Tonys. With this win, first African-American to win twice in this category |
| 2004 | Sanaa Lathan | A Raisin in the Sun | Nominated | |
| 2005 | Adriane Lenox | Doubt | Won | |
| 2012 | Condola Rashad | Stick Fly | Nominated | |
| 2013 | Shalita Grant | Vanya and Sonia and Masha and Spike | Nominated | |
| 2013 | Condola Rashad | The Trip to Bountiful | Nominated | |
| 2014 | Sophie Okonedo | A Raisin in the Sun | Won | |
| 2014 | Anika Noni Rose | A Raisin in the Sun | Nominated | |
| 2016 | Pascale Armand | Eclipsed | Nominated | |
| 2016 | Saycon Sengbloh | Eclipsed | Nominated | |
| 2017 | Condola Rashad | A Doll's House, Part 2 | Nominated | |
| 2017 | Michelle Wilson | Sweat | Nominated | |
| 2018 | Noma Dumezweni | Harry Potter and the Cursed Child, Parts One and Two | Nominated | |
| 2020 | Chalia La Tour | Slave Play | Nominated | |
| 2022 | Uzo Aduba | Clyde's | Nominated | |
| 2022 | Kenita R. Miller | for colored girls who have considered suicide/when the rainbow is enuf | Nominated | |
| 2022 | Phylicia Rashad | Skeleton Crew | Won | |
| 2022 | Kara Young | Clyde's | Nominated | |
| 2023 | Nikki Crawford | Fat Ham | Nominated | |
| 2023 | Crystal Lucas-Perry | Ain't No Mo' | Nominated | |
| 2023 | Kara Young | Cost of Living | Nominated | |
| 2024 | Quincy Tyler Bernstine | Doubt: A Parable | Nominated | |
| 2024 | Juliana Canfield | Stereophonic | Nominated | |
| 2024 | Kara Young | Purlie Victorious: A Non-Confederate Romp Through the Cotton Patch | Won | |
| 2025 | Kara Young | Purpose | Won | |

== Performance by an Actress in a Leading Role in a Musical ==
Tony Award for Best Performance by an Actress in a Leading Role in a Musical
| Year | Nominee | Show | Result | Milestone |
|---|---|---|---|---|
| 1958 | Lena Horne | Jamaica | Nominated | |
| 1962 | Diahann Carroll | No Strings | Won | First African-American winner in a lead role. |
| 1964 | Carol Channing | Hello, Dolly! | Won | Channing is German-American and African-American. |
| 1968 | Leslie Uggams | Hallelujah, Baby! | Won | |
| 1972 | Jonelle Allen | Two Gentlemen of Verona | Nominated | |
| 1974 | Virginia Capers | Raisin | Won | |
| 1975 | Lola Falana | Doctor Jazz | Nominated | |
| 1976 | Vivian Reed | Bubbling Brown Sugar | Nominated | |
| 1977 | Clamma Dale | Porgy and Bess | Nominated | |
| 1977 | Ernestine Jackson | Guys and Dolls | Nominated | |
| 1978 | Eartha Kitt | Timbuktu! | Nominated | |
| 1982 | Jennifer Holliday | Dreamgirls | Won | |
| 1982 | Sheryl Lee Ralph | Dreamgirls | Nominated | |
| 1983 | Lonette McKee | Show Boat | Nominated | |
| 1984 | Rhetta Hughes | Amen Corner | Nominated | |
| 1986 | Debbie Allen | Sweet Charity | Nominated | |
| 1989 | Ruth Brown | Black and Blue | Won | |
| 1989 | Linda Hopkins | Black and Blue | Nominated | |
| 1997 | Pamela Isaacs | The Life | Nominated | |
| 1997 | Tonya Pinkins | Play On! | Nominated | |
| 2000 | Heather Headley | Aida | Won | |
| 2000 | Audra McDonald | Marie Christine | Nominated | |
| 2002 | Vanessa L. Williams | Into the Woods | Nominated | |
| 2004 | Tonya Pinkins | Caroline, or Change | Nominated | |
| 2006 | LaChanze | The Color Purple | Won | |
| 2007 | Audra McDonald | 110 in the Shade | Nominated | |
| 2010 | Montego Glover | Memphis | Nominated | |
| 2011 | Patina Miller | Sister Act | Nominated | |
| 2012 | Audra McDonald | The Gershwins' Porgy and Bess | Won | With this win, first African-American to win 5 Tonys. |
| 2013 | Patina Miller | Pippin | Won | |
| 2013 | Valisia LeKae | Motown: The Musical | Nominated | |
| 2016 | Cynthia Erivo | The Color Purple | Won | |
| 2017 | Denée Benton | Natasha, Pierre & The Great Comet of 1812 | Nominated | |
| 2018 | Hailey Kilgore | Once on This Island | Nominated | |
| 2018 | LaChanze | Summer: The Donna Summer Musical | Nominated | |
| 2020 | Adrienne Warren | Tina - The Tina Turner Musical | Won | |
| 2022 | Sharon D. Clarke | Caroline, or Change | Nominated | |
| 2022 | Joaquina Kalukango | Paradise Square | Won | |
| 2023 | Lorna Courtney | & Juliet | Nominated | |
| 2024 | Maleah Joi Moon | Hell's Kitchen | Won | |
| 2025 | Audra McDonald | Gypsy | Nominated | |
| 2026 | Christiani Pitts | Two Strangers (Carry A Cake Across New York) | Nominated | |

== Performance by an Actress in a Leading Role in a Play ==
Tony Award for Best Performance by an Actress in a Leading Role in a Play
| Year | Nominee | Show | Result |
|---|---|---|---|
| 1960 | Claudia McNeil | A Raisin in the Sun | Nominated |
| 1963 | Claudia McNeil | Tiger Tiger Burning Bright | Nominated |
| 1965 | Beah Richards | The Amen Corner | Nominated |
| 1965 | Diana Sands | The Owl and the Pussycat | Nominated |
| 1994 | Anna Deavere Smith | Twilight: Los Angeles, 1992 | Nominated |
| 1995 | Mary Alice | Having Our Say | Nominated |
| 2001 | Leslie Uggams | King Hedley II | Nominated |
| 2004 | Phylicia Rashad | A Raisin in the Sun | Won |
| 2005 | Phylicia Rashad | Gem of the Ocean | Nominated |
| 2008 | S. Epatha Merkerson | Come Back, Little Sheba | Nominated |
| 2010 | Viola Davis | Fences | Won |
| 2013 | Cicely Tyson | The Trip to Bountiful | Won |
| 2014 | LaTanya Richardson Jackson | A Raisin in the Sun | Nominated |
| 2014 | Audra McDonald | Lady Day at Emerson's Bar & Grill | Won |
| 2016 | Lupita Nyong'o | Eclipsed | Nominated |
| 2016 | Sophie Okonedo | Arthur Miller's The Crucible | Nominated |
| 2018 | Condola Rashad | Saint Joan | Nominated |
| 2018 | Lauren Ridloff | Children of a Lesser God | Nominated |
| 2020 | Joaquina Kalukango | Slave Play | Nominated |
| 2020 | Audra McDonald | Frankie and Johnny in the Clair de Lune | Nominated |
| 2022 | Gabby Beans | The Skin of Our Teeth | Nominated |
| 2022 | LaChanze | Trouble in Mind | Nominated |
| 2022 | Ruth Negga | Macbeth | Nominated |
| 2023 | Audra McDonald | Ohio State Murders | Nominated |
| 2025 | LaTanya Richardson Jackson | Purpose | Nominated |

== Play ==
Tony Award for Best Play
| Year | Nominee | Show | Result |
|---|---|---|---|
| 1960 | Lorraine Hansberry (as playwright) | A Raisin in the Sun | Nominated |
| 1974 | Joseph A. Walker (as playwright) | The River Niger | Won |
| 1975 | John Kani and Winston Ntshona (as playwright) | Sizwe Banzi is Dead and The Island | Nominated |
| 1976 | Leslie Lee (as playwright) | The First Breeze of Summer | Nominated |
| 1977 | Ntozake Shange (as playwright) | For Colored Girls Who Have Considered Suicide When the Rainbow Is Enuf | Nominated |
| 1980 | Samm-Art Williams (as playwright) | Home | Nominated |
| 1985 | August Wilson (as playwright) | Ma Rainey's Black Bottom | Nominated |
| 1987 | August Wilson (as playwright) | Fences | Won |
| 1988 | August Wilson (as playwright) | Joe Turner's Come and Gone | Nominated |
| 1990 | August Wilson (as playwright), Lloyd Richards (as producer) | The Piano Lesson | Nominated |
| 1992 | August Wilson (as playwright) | Two Trains Running | Nominated |
| 1993 | Tug Yourgrau (as playwright) | The Song of Jacob Zulu | Nominated |
| 1994 | George C. Wolfe (as producer) | Angels in America: Perestroika | Won |
| 1994 | Anna Deavere Smith (as playwright), George C. Wolfe (as producer) | Twilight: Los Angeles, 1992 | Nominated |
| 1995 | Camille Cosby (as producer) | Having Our Say | Nominated |
| 1996 | August Wilson (as playwright) | Seven Guitars | Nominated |
| 1998 | George C. Wolfe (as producer) | Golden Child | Nominated |
| 2000 | George C. Wolfe (as producer) | The Ride Down Mt. Morgan | Nominated |
| 2001 | August Wilson (as playwright) | King Hedley II | Nominated |
| 2002 | Suzan-Lori Parks (as playwright), George C. Wolfe (as producer) | Topdog/Underdog | Nominated |
| 2003 | George C. Wolfe (as producer) | Take Me Out | Won |
| 2005 | August Wilson (as playwright) | Gem of the Ocean | Nominated |
| 2007 | August Wilson (as playwright), Wendell Pierce (as producer), Tamara Tunie (as producer) | Radio Golf | Nominated |
| 2012 | Wendell Pierce (as producer) | Clybourne Park | Won |
| 2013 | Ron Simons (as producer) | Vanya and Sonia and Masha and Spike | Won |
| 2016 | Danai Gurira (as playwright), Stephen C. Byrd (as producer), Alia Jones-Harvey (as producer), Alani LaLa Anthony (as producer) | Eclipsed | Nominated |
| 2017 | Lynn Nottage (as playwright) | Sweat | Nominated |
| 2019 | Tarell Alvin McCraney (as playwright) | Choir Boy | Nominated |
| 2020 | Rashad V. Chambers (as producer) | The Inheritance | Won |
| 2020 | Jeremy O. Harris (as playwright and producer) | Slave Play | Nominated |
| 2020 | Brian Moreland (as producer) | Sea Wall/A Life | Nominated |
| 2020 | Brian Moreland (as producer) | The Sound Inside | Nominated |
| 2022 | Lynn Nottage (as playwright) | Clyde's | Nominated |
| 2022 | Dominique Morisseau (as playwright) | Skeleton Crew | Nominated |
| 2023 | Jordan E. Cooper (as playwright), RuPaul Charles (as producer), Lee Daniels (as producer), Jeremy O. Harris (as producer), C. J. Uzomah (as producer), Lena Waithe (as producer) | Ain't No Mo' | Nominated |
| 2023 | James Ijames (as playwright), Rashad V. Chambers (as producer), Colman Domingo (as producer), Cynthia Erivo (as producer) | Fat Ham | Nominated |
| 2024 | Jocelyn Bioh (as playwright), LaChanze (as producer), Taraji P. Henson (as producer) | Jaja's African Hair Braiding | Nominated |
| 2025 | Branden Jacobs-Jenkins (as playwright), Rashad V. Chambers (as producer), Debra Martin Chase (as producer), LaChanze (as producer) | Purpose | Won |

== Regional Theatre Tony Award ==
Regional Theatre Tony Award
| Year | Nominee | Result |
|---|---|---|
| 1999 | Crossroads Theatre | Won |

== Revival of a Musical ==
Tony Award for Best Revival of a Musical
| Year | Nominee | Show | Result |
|---|---|---|---|
| 2012 | Irene Gandy (as producer), Ron Simons (as producer) | The Gershwins’ Porgy and Bess | Won |
| 2014 | Brandon Victor Dixon (as producer) | Hedwig and the Angry Inch | Won |
| 2016 | Oprah Winfrey (as producer), Quincy Jones (as producer) | The Color Purple | Won |
| 2022 | Rashad V. Chambers (as producer) | Caroline, or Change | Nominated |
| 2023 | Diane Scott Carter (as producer) | Parade | Won |
| 2024 | Stephen C Byrd (as producer) | Cabaret at the Kit Kat Club | Nominated |
| 2024 | Lamar Richardson (as producer) | Merrily We Roll Along | Won |
| 2025 | Lamar Richardson (as producer), Diane Scott Carter (as producer), Kerry Washington (as producer) | Gypsy | Nominated |
| 2026 | Cynthia Erivo (as producer), LaChanze (as producer), Jeremy Pope (as producer), Law Roach (as producer), Lena Waithe (as producer) | Cats: The Jellicle Ball | Nominated |
| 2026 | Lamar Richardson (as producer) | Ragtime | Won |

== Revival of a Play ==
Tony Award for Best Revival of a Play
| Year | Nominee | Show | Result |
|---|---|---|---|
| 2004 | Susan Batson (as producer) | A Raisin in the Sun | Nominated |
| 2013 | Kevin Liles (as producer), Stephen C. Byrd (as producer), Alia M. Jones (as producer) | The Trip to Bountiful | Nominated |
| 2017 | Mike Jackson (as producer), John Legend (as producer), Ron Simons (as producer) | August Wilson's Jitney | Won |
| 2018 | Stephen C. Byrd (as producer), Alia Jones-Harvey (as producer) | Eugene O'Neill's The Iceman Cometh | Nominated |
| 2020 | Charles Fuller (as playwright) | A Soldier's Play | Won |
| 2020 | Rashad V. Chambers (as producer) | Betrayal | Nominated |
| 2022 | Brian Moreland (as producer) | American Buffalo | Nominated |
| 2022 | Ron Simons (as producer) | for colored girls who have considered suicide/when the rainbow is enuf | Nominated |
| 2023 | Kandi Burruss (as producer), Alia Jones-Harvey (as producer), Brian Anthony Moreland (as producer), Diane Scott Carter (as producer), Todd Tucker (as producer) | August Wilson's The Piano Lesson | Nominated |
| 2023 | Jeremy O. Harris (as producer), Diane Scott Carter (as producer) | The Sign in Sidney Brustein's Window | Nominated |
| 2023 | Rashad V. Chambers (as producer), Debra Martin Chase (as producer), LaChanze (as producer) | Suzan-Lori Parks' Topdog/Underdog | Won |
| 2024 | Branden Jacobs-Jenkins (as playwright), Lamar Richardson (as producer), Christen James (as producer), Alexander Robertson (as producer) | Appropriate | Won |
| 2024 | Leslie Odom, Jr. (as producer), Irene Gandy (as producer), Kenny Leon (as producer), Nicolette Robinson (as producer), LaTanya Richardson Jackson (as producer), Samuel L. Jackson (as producer), Phylicia Rashad (as producer), Nnamdi Asomugha (as producer), Kerry Washington (as producer) | Purlie Victorious: A Non-Confederate Romp Through the Cotton Patch | Nominated |
| 2025 | Stephen C. Byrd (as producer) | Romeo + Juliet | Nominated |
| 2025 | Irene Gandy (as producer), Kenny Leon (as producer) | Thornton Wilder's Our Town | Nominated |

== Sound Design of a Play ==
Tony Award for Best Sound Design of a Play
| Year | Nominee | Show | Result |
|---|---|---|---|
| 2022 | Justin Ellington | for colored girls who have considered suicide/when the rainbow is enuf | Nominated |
| 2022 | Mikaal Sulaiman | Macbeth | Nominated |
| 2023 | Taylor Williams | Ain't No Mo' | Nominated |
| 2024 | Justin Ellington | Jaja's African Hair Braiding | Nominated |
| 2026 | Justin Ellington | August Wilson's Joe Turner’s Come and Gone | Nominated |
| 2026 | Mikaal Sulaiman | Arthur Miller's Death of a Salesman | Won |

== Special Theatrical Event ==
Tony Award for Best Special Theatrical Event
| Year | Nominee | Show | Result |
|---|---|---|---|
| 2002 | George C. Wolfe (as producer) | Elaine Stritch at Liberty | Won |

== Special Tony Awards ==
Special Tony Award
| Year | Nominee | Show | Result |
|---|---|---|---|
| 1968 | Pearl Bailey | | Won |
| 1977 | Diana Ross | | Won |
| 1981 | Lena Horne | Lena Horne: The Lady and Her Music | Won |
| 2006 | Sarah Jones | Bridge & Tunnel | Won |
| 2016 | Brian Stokes Mitchell | | Won |
| 2017 | James Earl Jones | | Won |
| 2019 | Harold Wheeler | | Won |
| 2019 | Jason Michael Webb | Choir Boy | Won |
| 2020 | Irene Gandy | | Won |
| 2020 | Beverly Jenkins | | Won |
| 2020 | The Broadway Advocacy Coalition | | Won |
| 2023 | Lisa Dawn Cave | | Won |
| 2024 | Nikiya Mathis | Jaja's African Hair Braiding | Won |
| 2024 | Colleen Jennings-Roggensack | | Won |
| 2024 | Billy Porter | | Won |
| 2024 | George C. Wolfe | | Won |

== See also ==
- List of Tony Award records

== Sources ==
- Tony Award-related website
