= Kenny Leon's True Colors Theatre Company =

Kenny Leon's True Colors Theatre Company is a 501(c)3 non-profit theatre company in Atlanta, GA co-founded by Tony-winning Broadway director Kenny Leon and Jane Bishop in 2002. True Colors Theatre Company had their inaugural season in 2003-2004 under the leadership of co-founder and Artistic Director Kenny Leon. True Colors Theatre Company produces world premiere plays by diverse playwrights as well as a commitment to preserving African-American classics. There is no permanent theater space for the company, they have dubbed themselves a "moveable feast", presenting plays at the Southwest Arts Center, Theatrical Outfits Balzer Theatre, Porter Sanford III Performing Arts Center and the Rialto Center.

The educational component of True Colors Theatre Company is the August Wilson Monologue Competition, which was begun in 2007 by Kenny Leon and Todd Kreidler, dramaturg to the playwright August Wilson, after his death in 2005. In 2009 the program became a national program exposing high school students across the United States to the works of August Wilson as well as their teachers. This educational program began in Atlanta, GA and has now spread to a total of eight regions: Atlanta, GA; Boston, MA; Chicago, IL; Los Angeles, CA; New York, NY; Pittsburgh, PA; Portland, OR and Seattle, WA. High school students compete in their region reciting monologues from works in August Wilson's Century Cycle. Finalists from each city advance to compete in New York City on the August Wilson Theatre stage.

In 2013, True Colors was awarded the American Theatre Wing's National Theatre Company Grant.

In 2018, Jamil Jude was named artistic director of True Colors beginning in the 2019-20 season. His motto is "True Colors thrives at the intersection of artistic excellence and civic engagement".

== Works ==
Season	Production	Playwright	Run
2003-2004	Fences	August Wilson	October 2003
2003-2004	Steel Magnolias	Robert Harling	March 2004
2003-2004	Tambourines to Glory	Langston Hughes	July 2004, ATL; Sept 2004, DC
2004-2005	The Wiz	William F. Brown	December 2004
2004-2005	Brass Birds Don't Sing	Samm-Art Williams	January 2005
2004-2005	Flyin' West	Pearl Cleage	July 2004, ATL; Sept 2005, DC; Oct 2005, Tour
2005-2006	The Wiz	William F. Brown	December 2005
2005-2006	Rejoice!	Cheryl L. West	July 2006
2006-2007	The Wiz	William F. Brown	December 2006
2006-2007	Emergence-SEE!	Daniel Beaty	Jan & Jul 2007, ATL; Feb 2007, DC
2006-2007	Stick Fly	Lydia R. Diamond	May 2007
2006-2007	Ceremonies in Dark Old Men	Lonne Elder III	July 2007
2007-2008	The Wiz	William F. Brown	December 2007
2007-2008	Resurrection	Daniel Beaty	January 2008
2007-2008	The Amen Corner	James Baldwin	July 2008
2008-2009	Swimming Upstream	Eve Ensler	November 2008
2008-2009	Black Nativity	Langston Hughes	December 2008
2008-2009	Miss Evers' Boys	David Feldshuh	March 2009
2008-2009	Blues for an Alabama Sky	Pearl Cleage	May 2009
2008-2009	for colored girls who have considered suicide when the rainbow is enuf	Ntozake Shange	July 2009
2009-2010	The Sty of the Blind Pig	Philip Hayes Dean	October 2009
2009-2010	Black Nativity	Langston Hughes	December 2009
2009-2010	Our Town	Thornton Wilder	February 2010
2009-2010	Jitney	August Wilson	May/June 2010
2010-2011	Gut Bucket Blues	David H. Bell	September 2010
2010-2011	Black Nativity	Langston Hughes	December 2010
2010-2011	Broke-ology	Nathan Louis Jackson	January 2011
2010-2011	The Colored Museum	George C. Wolfe	March 2011
2010-2011	Fool for Love	Sam Shepard	May 2011
2011-2012	The Nativity	Patdro Harris	December 2011
2011-2012	Guess Who's Coming to Dinner	Todd Kreidler	July 2012
2012-2013	The Mountaintop	Katori Hall	November/December 2012
2012-2013	Two Trains Running	August Wilson	February/March 2013
2012-2013	Shakin the Rafters	David H. Bell	July/August 2013
2013-2014	Spunk	George C. Wolfe	September/October 2013
2013-2014	Race	David Mamet	February/March 2014
2013-2014	Same Time, Next Year	Bernard Slade	July/August 2014
2017-2018	Holler If Ya Hear Me	Todd Kreidler	September/October 2017
2018-2019	Nina Simone: Four Women	Christina Ham	September 2018
2018-2019	East Texas Hot Links	Eugene Lee	July 2019
2018-2019	Skeleton Crew	Dominique Morisseau	February 2019
2019-2020	Paradise Blue	Dominique Morisseau	September/October 2019
2019-2020	School Girls; Or, the African Mean Girls Play	Jocelyn Bioh	February/March 2020
