= We Strangers =

- Theatrical release poster
- Directed by: Anu Valia
- Written by: Anu Valia
- Produced by: Olivia Wingate; Alex Bach; Zach Spicer; Joy Jorgensen; Miranda Kahn; John Marshall; Gordon Strain
- Starring: Kirby Howell-Baptiste; Tina Lifford; Sarah Goldberg; Maria Dizzia; Kara Young; Hari Dhillon; Paul Adelstein; Mischa Reddy
- Cinematography: Charlotte Hornsby
- Edited by: James Codoyannis
- Music by: Jay Wadley
- Production companies: Pigasus Pictures; Wingate Media; Mirmade; Killjoy Films
- Distributed by: Quiver Distribution
- Release dates: March 9, 2024 (SXSW); August 22, 2025 (United States)
- Running time: 80 minutes
- Country: United States
- Language: English
- Box office: $9,526

We Strangers is a 2024 American drama film, written and directed by Anu Valia in her film directorial debut. It stars Kirby Howell-Baptiste, Tina Lifford, Sarah Goldberg, Maria Dizzia, Kara Young, Hari Dhillon, Paul Adelstein and Mischa Reddy.

It had its world premiere at South by Southwest on March 9, 2024. It was released on August 22, 2025, by Quiver Distribution.

== Cast ==
- Kirby Howell-Baptiste as Ray Martin
- Tina Lifford as Willie Martin
- Sarah Goldberg as Tracy Patel
- Maria Dizzia as Jean Laich
- Kara Young as Mari Winters
- Hari Dhillon as Neeraj Patel
- Paul Adelstein as Ed Laich
- Mischa Reddy as Sunny Patel

== Production ==
In July 2021, it was announced Anu Valia would direct the film from a screenplay she wrote, with Olivia Wingate set to serve as producer. The film has received support from Cinereach, Hamptons International Film Festival, Tribeca Film Institute, In April 2023, it was announced Kirby Howell-Baptiste and Sarah Goldberg had joined the cast of the film, with principal photography taking place in Indiana.

== Release ==
It had its world premiere at South by Southwest on March 9, 2024. It was released on August 22, 2025.

== Reception ==
On the review aggregator website Rotten Tomatoes, 85% of 13 critics' reviews are positive.

On IndieWire, Christian Zilko rated it an A− writing that "Valia masterfully illustrates the tensions among the complex system of social graces that fuel elite society." On Austin Chronicle, Dex Wesley Parra wrote: "Even if at times certain conceits need refinement, the bold choices and ideas presented strike such a singular tone that it’s hard not to look forward to more from this filmmaker."

== See also ==
- List of drama films of the 2020s
- List of American films of 2024
