= Gone Are the Days! =

1963 film by Nicholas Webster

- Directed by: Nicholas Webster
- Screenplay by: Ossie Davis
- Based on: Purlie Victorious by Ossie Davis
- Produced by: Brock Peters; Nicholas Webster
- Starring: Ossie Davis; Ruby Dee; Godfrey Cambridge
- Cinematography: Boris Kaufman
- Edited by: Ralph Rosenblum
- Production company: Hammer Film Corp.
- Release date: September 23, 1963
- Running time: 99 minutes
- Country: United States
- Language: English

Gone Are the Days! or Purlie Victorious is a 1963 American comedy-drama film starring Ossie Davis, Ruby Dee and Godfrey Cambridge. It is based on the 1961 Broadway play Purlie Victorious, which was written by Davis. Davis, Dee, Cambridge, Beah Richards, Sorrell Booke and Alan Alda (in his film debut), reprised their roles from the Broadway production.

== Cast ==
- Ossie Davis as Reverend Purlie Victorious Judson
- Ruby Dee as Lutiebelle Gussie Mae Jenkins
- Godfrey Cambridge as Gitlow Judson
- Hilda Haynes as Missy Judson
- Beah Richards as Idella Landy
- Alan Alda as Charlie Cotchipee
- Charles Welch as Sheriff
- Ralph Roberts as Deputy
- Sorrell Booke as Ol' Cap', Stonewall Jackson Cotchipee

== Reception ==
The New York Times review stated "The cancers of segregation, blind bigotry and Uncle Tom were made funny but real, and therefore howlingly effective, by the dual artistry of playwright-star Ossie Davis. As a Negro seeing his people and their tormentors comically plain, he filled the stage with humor, insight and passion." The critic noted, however, that "Mr. Davis's, [sic] manufactured folk tale has, with the passage of just two years and the shedding of blood in Birmingham, lost some of its laughter. And the somewhat static quality of Nicholas Webster's direction, which clings to stage techniques, is not much of a help."
