= Kenny Leon =

American stage and television director

- Leon in 2026
- Born: Kenneth Leroy Leon; February 10, 1956 (age 70); Tallahassee, Florida, U.S.
- Education: Clark Atlanta University (BA); Southwestern University (attended)
- Occupations: Director, producer, actor

Kenny Leon (born February 10, 1956) is an American director and actor. He is notable for his extensive work on Broadway and television as well as in regional theater. He has received a Tony Award and a Drama League Award as well as nominations for three Primetime Emmy Awards and a Drama Desk Award.

Leon won the Tony Award for Best Direction of a Play for A Raisin in the Sun (2014). He was Tony-nominated for Fences (2010), A Soldier's Play (2019), Purlie Victorious (2023), and The Balusters (2026). He has also directed notable productions of Radio Golf (2007), Topdog/Underdog (2022), and Our Town (2024). He received Primetime Emmy Award nominations for Hairspray Live! (2017), American Son (2019), and Robin Roberts Presents: Mahalia (2021).

== Early life and education ==
Kenny Leon was born on February 10, 1956, in Tallahassee, Florida. His father is Leroy Leon, and his mother is Annie Ruth, who was 15 when she gave birth to Kenny. He has five siblings. In Tallahassee, he lived with his grandmother, Maime Wilson Roberts Harris, and attended a one-room school house.

When he was nine years, he moved from Tallahassee to St. Petersburg, Florida. He attended 16th Street Junior High and Northeast High School. In high school, he participated in a federally funded Upward Bound academic and cultural enrichment program at Florida Presbyterian College. He made his stage debut in a Upward Bound theater production. Angela Bassett was also a theater student in the program. He graduated from Northeast High School in 1974.

For college, Leon attended Clark Atlanta University, where he received his B.A. degree in political science in 1978. After college graduation, he enrolled in Southwestern University School of Law. In 1979, he dropped out of law school and returned to Atlanta to pursue a theatrical career.

== Career ==
Leon got his first break working at the Academy Theatre in Hapeville, Georgia.

In 1988, he was selected as associate artistic director of the Alliance Theatre Company, the largest theater company in Atlanta. In 1990, he was named the Alliance's artistic director and became one of the few African Americans to lead a large nonprofit theater company in the United States. During Leon's tenure, the company staged premieres of Pearl Cleage's Blues for an Alabama Sky, Alfred Uhry's The Last Night of Ballyhoo, and Elton John and Tim Rice's musical Aida, which went on to Broadway. The Alliance's endowment also rose from $1 to $5 million during his time there.

Leon resigned from the Alliance in 2000 to take on other projects. These included being the co-founder and artistic director of True Colors Theatre Company, a group based in both Atlanta and Washington, D.C. He also took his talents to Broadway. In the spring of 2004, he directed a revival of Lorraine Hansberry's A Raisin in the Sun, starring Sean Combs, Phylicia Rashad and Audra McDonald, in his Broadway debut. At the end of that year, he directed the Broadway premiere of August Wilson's Gem of the Ocean. In 2005, he directed Margaret Garner, an opera by Richard Danielpour with a libretto by Toni Morrison. In spring 2007, he directed August Wilson's Radio Golf. All three plays were nominated for Tony Awards, and Leon was a Drama Desk Award nominee for A Raisin in the Sun. He also directed the television version of A Raisin in the Sun, which aired on ABC in February 2008. He was nominated for a Tony Award in 2010 for Best Director for his work on August Wilson's Fences, starring Denzel Washington and Viola Davis, earning them both nominations and wins for Best Actor and Actress in a Play.

In November 2010, Leon directed Phylicia Rashad in the world premiere stage play Every Tongue Confess written by Marcus Gardley, which ran at the Arena Stage in Washington, D.C. Leon has also directed plays at the Cincinnati Playhouse in the Park, the Huntington Theatre Company in Boston, the New York Shakespeare Festival, the Goodman Theatre in Chicago, and other venues. In January 2012, he completed a Lifetime Original Television remake of Steel Magnolias. Other projects at that time included the world premiere of a staged adaptation of the 1967 film Guess Who's Coming to Dinner at the Kenny Leon's True Colors Theatre Company; and a musical inspired by the work of rapper Tupac Shakur.

In 2014, he directed the Broadway revival of A Raisin in the Sun starring Denzel Washington and LaTanya Richardson Jackson and the Broadway premiere of the musical Holler If Ya Hear Me, featuring the discography of Tupac Shakur. A Raisin in the Sun earned Leon a Tony Award for Best Direction of a Play. That same year Leon directed NPR Presents Water±, written by award-winning NPR Science Correspondent Christopher Joyce, and award-winning theater writers Arthur Yorinks and Carl Hancock Rux, with an original sound score by violinist Daniel Bernard Roumain (DBR). The show toured nationally, co-hosted by NPR's Michele Norris and WWNO's Eve Troeh and featuring Tony Award-winner Anika Noni Rose (Caroline, or Change); Tony Award-nominee Michele Shay (August Wilson's Seven Guitars); Jason Dirden (Tony Award-winning production A Raisin in the Sun); and Lucas Caleb Rooney (Boardwalk Empire).

In 2015, Leon directed the live musical The Wiz for NBC. Cirque du Soleil partnered on the production with plans to bring the show to Broadway. He was slated to direct both the television production and the planned Broadway revival. In 2016, Leon once again partnered with NBC for Hairspray Live!, starring Ariana Grande, Jennifer Hudson, Kristin Chenoweth, and Harvey Fierstein.

In addition to his directing experience, he has extensive acting experience on stage and in television and film. He made an appearance in the Hollywood Black Film Festival winner Big Ain't Bad, playing the role of Thomas Jordan, the mayor of Atlanta. His memoir, Take You Wherever You Go, was released in June, 2018, by Grand Central Publishing. The title derives advice he received from his grandmother, Mamie Wilson. Leon directed the 2019 Netflix film American Son, based on the play of the same name which he had directed on stage.

In 2019, he directed the Broadway premiere of Charles Fuller's Pulitzer Prize winning play, A Soldier's Play, starring Blair Underwood and David Alan Grier at Roundabout Theatre Company. He also directed The Underlying Chris at Second Stage Theatre Company and summer 2019's acclaimed production of Much Ado About Nothing at the Delacorte/Shakespeare in the Park. In May 2022, the Alliance Theatre in Atlanta debuted Trading Places: The Musical! directed by Leon.

In 2026, Leon was appointed Chair of the American Theatre Wing.

== Works ==
=== Television ===
==== Director ====
Year	Title	Notes
2002	Nowhere Road	
2009	Ghost Whisperer	Episode: "Excessive Forces"
2010–11	Private Practice	2 episodes
2018–21	Dynasty	6 episodes
2019	Ambitions	2 episodes
2021	Amend: The Fight for America	6 episodes
2021	Colin in Black & White	Episode: "Dear Colin"
2021	Gossip Girl	Episode: "Posts on a Scandal"
2021	4400	Episode: "Empowered Women"

TV movies

- A Raisin in the Sun (2008)
- Steel Magnolias (2012)
- The Watsons Go to Birmingham (2013)
- In My Dreams (2014)
- American Son (2019)
- Robin Roberts Presents: Mahalia (2021)

TV special

- The Wiz Live! (2015)
- Hairspray Live! (2016)

==== Acting roles ====
Year	Title	Role	Notes
1990–91	In the Heat of the Night	Thomas/Daryl	2 episode
2002	Big Ain't Bad	Mayor Jordan	

TV movies

Year	Title	Role
1988	Case Closed	Man in Alley
1990	Web of Deceit	Dr. Poole
1992	The Nightman	Johnson
1992	In the Line of Duty: Street War	Raheem
1993	I'll Fly Away: Then and Now	Arthur
2002	The Rosa Parks Story	Minister #2
2012	Kasha and the Zulu King	Kasha
2021	Robin Roberts Presents: Mahalia	Professor Kendricks

=== Stage ===
As a director

Year	Title	Venue	Ref.
2004	A Raisin in the Sun	Royale Theatre, Broadway	
2004	Gem of the Ocean	Walter Kerr Theatre, Broadway	
2005	Margaret Garner	Michigan Opera Theatre, Detroit	
2005	Tambourines to Glory	Lincoln Center, Washington D.C.	
2007	Radio Golf	Cort Theatre, Broadway	
2010	Fences	Cort Theatre, Broadway	
2011	The Mountaintop	Bernard B. Jacobs Theatre, Broadway	
2011	Stick Fly	Cort Theatre, Broadway	
2014	A Raisin in the Sun	Ethel Barrymore Theatre, Broadway	
2014	Holler If Ya Hear Me	Palace Theatre, Broadway	
2016	Smart People	Second Stage Theatre, Off-Broadway	
2017	Our Town	Fox Theatre, Atlanta	
2018	Children of a Lesser God	Studio 54, Broadway	
2018	American Son	Booth Theatre, Broadway	
2019	Much Ado About Nothing	Delacorte Theatre, Off-Broadway	
2019	The Underlying Chris	Second Stage Theatre, Off-Broadway	
2019–20	A Soldier's Play	American Airlines Theatre, Broadway	
2022	King James	Steppenwolf Theatre, Chicago	
2022	Trading Places: The Musical!	Alliance Theatre, Atlanta	
2022	Topdog/Underdog	Golden Theatre, Broadway	
2022	Ohio State Murders	James Earl Jones Theatre, Broadway	
2023	Purlie Victorious	Music Box Theatre, Broadway	
2023	Hamlet	Delacorte Theatre, Off-Broadway	
2024	Home	Todd Haimes Theatre, Broadway	
2024	Our Town	Ethel Barrymore Theatre, Broadway	
2025	Othello	Ethel Barrymore Theatre, Broadway	
2025–26	Amahl and the Night Visitors	Mitzi E. Newhouse Theater, Off-Broadway	
2026	The Balusters	Samuel J. Friedman Theatre, Broadway	
2026–27	The Conversation	Astor Place Theatre, Off-Broadway	

As an actor

Year	Title	Role	Venue	Ref.
2003	Gem of the Ocean	Citizen Barlow	Goodman Theatre, Chicago	
2009	Blood Knot	Zachariah	Balzer Theatre, Atlanta	

== Reception and honors ==
In 2004, People named him one of the "50 Most Beautiful People" of the year. In 2007, he was a recipient of the 2007 Georgia Arts and Entertainment Legacy Award for his contributions to Georgia's cultural legacy. In 2010, Leon won the Drama League Award for Excellence in Directing for the play Fences. In 2014, he won the Tony Award for Best Direction of a Play for A Raisin in the Sun.

Leon was awarded the 2016-2017 "Mr. Abbott" Award for outstanding artistry and creativity, which is presented by the Stage Directors and Choreographers (SDC) Foundation, in recognition for his over 40-year career. In October 2017, Leon was the recipient the Governor's Award for the Arts and Humanities for the State of Georgia.

He held the Denzel Washington Endowed Chair in Theatre at Fordham University, previously held by Joe Morton and Phylicia Rashad.

=== Awards and nominations ===
Year	Award	Category	Project	Result	Ref.
2004	Drama Desk Award	Outstanding Director of a Play	A Raisin in the Sun	Nominated	
2024	Drama Desk Award	Outstanding Director of a Play	Purlie Victorious	Nominated	
2026	Drama Desk Award	Outstanding Director of a Play	The Balusters	Nominated	
2010	Drama League Award	Excellence in Directing	Fences	Won	
2023	Drama League Award	Outstanding Direction of a Play	Topdog/Underdog	Nominated	
2005	Helen Hayes Award	Outstanding Director	Tambourines to Glory	Nominated	
2009	Outer Critics Circle Award	Outstanding Direction of Play	Fences	Nominated	
2023	Outer Critics Circle Award	Outstanding Direction of a Play	Topdog/Underdog	Nominated	
2024	Outer Critics Circle Award	Outstanding Direction of a Play	Purlie Victorious	Nominated	
2017	Primetime Emmy Award	Outstanding Special Class Program	Hairspray Live!	Nominated	
2019	Primetime Emmy Award	Outstanding Television Movie	American Son	Nominated	
2021	Primetime Emmy Award	Outstanding Television Movie	Robin Roberts Presents: Mahalia	Nominated	
2010	Tony Awards	Best Direction of a Play	Fences	Nominated	
2014	Tony Awards	Best Direction of a Play	A Raisin in the Sun	Won	
2020	Tony Awards	Best Direction of a Play	A Soldier's Play	Nominated	
2024	Tony Awards	Best Direction of a Play	Purlie Victorious	Nominated	
2026	Tony Awards	Best Direction of a Play	The Balusters	Nominated	

== See also ==
- African-American Tony nominees and winners
