= Irene Gandy =

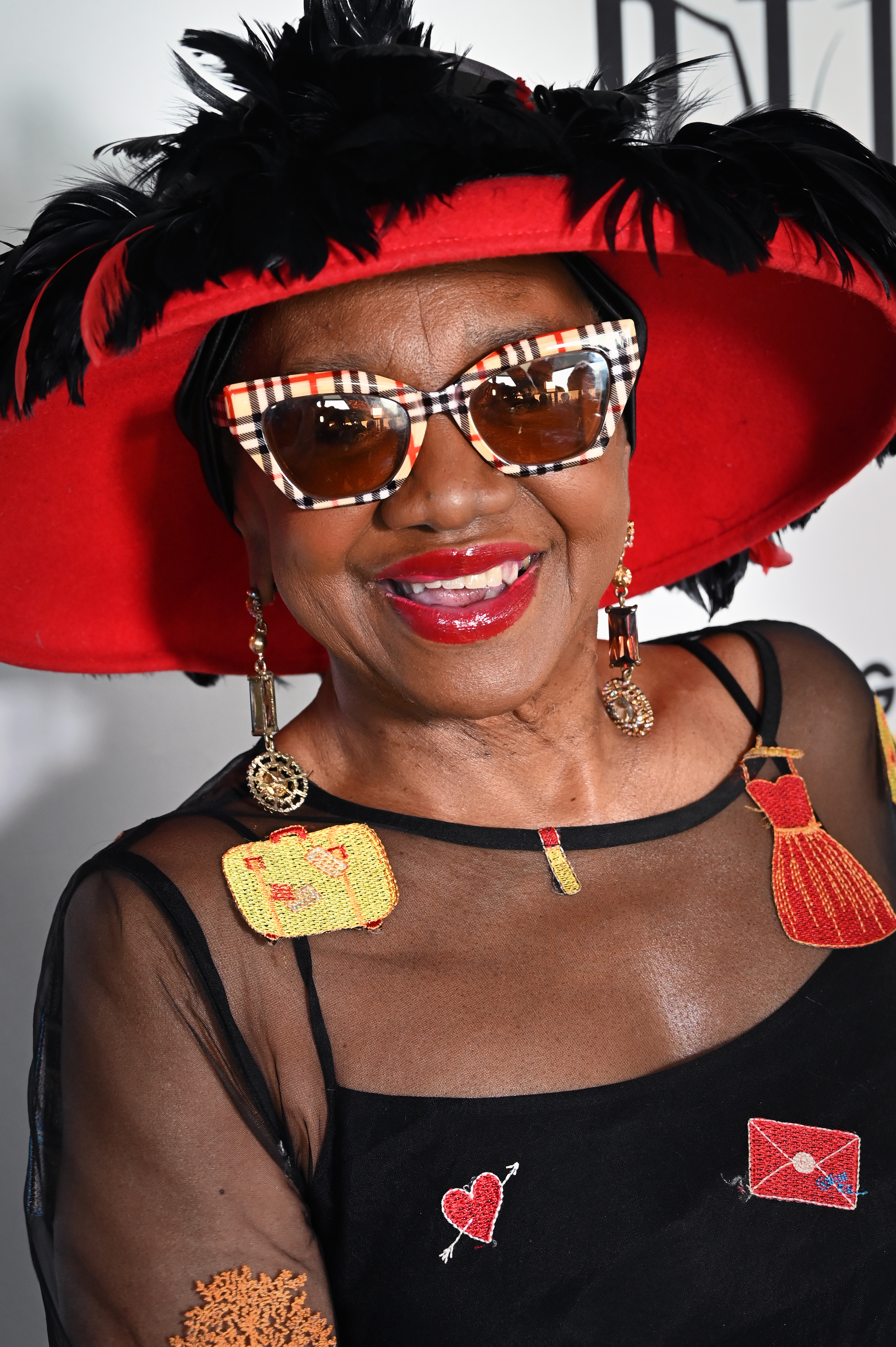
- Gandy in 2026
- Born: Westbury, New York, U.S.
- Occupations: Press Agent, Producer
- Years active: 1968–Present

Irene Gandy (born November 21, 1943) is an American theater publicist and producer. Notable for being the only African-American female publicist in the history of ATPAM., Gandy received the 2020 Tony Award for Excellence in Theatre.

== Early life ==
Gandy was born on November 21, 1943, in Westbury, New York.

== Career ==
Gandy attended NYU briefly, before dropping out and enmeshing herself into New York City's downtown theatrical scene. In 1968, she began her publicity career working under Douglas Turner Ward and Robert Hooks at the Negro Ensemble Company

In the late 1970s, Gandy turned away from theatre briefly to work as associate director of Special Markets for CBS Records, supervising Earth, Wind and Fire, The Jacksons, The Isley Brothers, and Labelle, among other artists.

The bulk of Gandy's Broadway publicity career was spent alongside producer/publicist Jeffrey Richards, with whom she represented over 100 Broadway productions.

Gandy was publicist for the 1987 revival of Sweet Charity, and was on hand when Bob Fosse died in Washington D.C. prior to an out-of-town preview.

In 1990, Gandy served as producer of the national tour of Sarafina!. In 2012, she made her Broadway producing debut with Porgy and Bess, for which she received the 2012 Tony Award for Best Revival of a Musical.

In 2020, Gandy was appointed to The Drama League Board of Directors, and in 2023, the Drama League renamed its Drama League Stage Directing Assistantships program to "The Drama League Irene Gandy Directing Assistantships" program.

== Personal life ==
Gandy is mother to artist Mira Gandy.

== Broadway Stage ==
Year	Production	Publicist	Producer	Notes
1970	Hay Fever	Yes	No	
1971	Johnny Johnson	Yes	No	
1976	Going Up	Yes	No	
1976	Wheelbarrow Closers	Yes	No	
1976	Don't Step On My Olive Branch	Yes	No	
1977	Gemini	Yes	No	
1979	Whoopee!	Yes	No	
1980	Your Arms Too Short to Box with God	Yes	No	
1980	A Lesson From Aloes	Yes	No	
1986	Me and My Girl	Yes	No	
1989	The Cirle	Yes	No	
1998	Patti Labelle On Broadway	Yes	No	
2001	A Thousand Clowns	Yes	No	
2003	Enchanted April	Yes	No	
2005	Glengarry Glen Ross	Yes	No	
2006	Spring Awakening	Yes	No	
2006	The Caine Mutiny Court Martial	Yes	No	
2007	August: Osage County	Yes	No	
2007	Radio Golf	Yes	No	
2007	Talk Radio	Yes	No	
2007	The Homecoming	Yes	No	
2008	November	Yes	No	
2008	Speed-the-Plow	Yes	No	
2009	Blithe Spirit	Yes	No	
2009	Desire Under the Elms	Yes	No	
2009	Race	Yes	No	
2009	Superior Donuts	Yes	No	
2009	You're Welcome America	Yes	No	
2010	A Life in the Theatre	Yes	No	
2010	All About Me	Yes	No	
2010	Bloody Bloody Andrew Jackson	Yes	No	
2010	Enron	Yes	No	
2011	Bonnie and Clyde	Yes	No	
2011	Chinglish	Yes	No	
2012	Glengarry Glen Ross	Yes	No	
2012	Porgy and Bess	Yes	Yes	
2012	The Anarchist	Yes	No	
2012	The Best Man	Yes	No	
2012	Who's Afraid of Virginia Woolf?	Yes	No	
2013	The Glass Menagerie	Yes	No	
2014	All The Way	Yes	No	
2014	Lady Day at Emerson's Bar and Grill	Yes	No	
2014	The Bridges of Madison County	Yes	No	
2014	The Realistic Joneses	Yes	No	
2014	You Can't Take It with You	Yes	No	
2015	The Heidi Chronicles	Yes	No	
2022	Ohio State Murders	No	Yes	
2023	Purlie Victorious	No	Yes	

== Awards and nominations ==
Year	Award	Category	Project	Result	Ref.
2012	Tony Awards	Best Revival of a Musical	The Gershwins' Porgy and Bess	Won	
2020	Tony Awards	Excellence in Theatre		Recipient	
