= Holler If Ya Hear Me (musical) =

2014 musical by Todd Kreidler

- Broadway Playbill cover
- Music: Tupac Shakur
- Lyrics: Tupac Shakur
- Book: Todd Kreidler
- Premiere: June 19, 2014: Palace Theatre
- Productions: 2014 Broadway

Holler If Ya Hear Me is a jukebox musical written by Todd Kreidler featuring the hip-hop music of Tupac Shakur.

According to Playbill, the musical is "a non-biographical story about friendship, family, revenge, change and hope. Inner city lives struggle for peace against the daily challenges they face in this entertaining and original musical".

== Productions ==
The musical had a five-week workshop in the summer of 2013.

The musical began previews on Broadway at the Palace Theatre on June 2, 2014, and officially opened on June 19, 2014. The musical closed on July 20, 2014, after 17 previews and 38 performances. Directed by Kenny Leon, the musical staging and choreography was by Wayne Cilento.

One of the producers, Eric L. Gold, "blamed the show's closing on 'the financial burdens of Broadway". Gold also told Variety that he made a " 'rookie mistake' by underestimating the amount of capital necessary to keep the $8 million show running".

A cast album of the musical was recorded but never released.

In 2017, Director Kenny Leon launched the first regional production in Atlanta. The script was revisited with a new cast. The production premiered on September 15, 2017.

== Cast ==
=== Principal roles and original Broadway cast ===
Sources: PlaybillVault; TheaterMania

- John – Saul Williams
- Vertus – Christopher Jackson
- Corinne – Saycon Sengbloh
- Darius – Joshua Boone
- Anthony – Dyllon Burnside
- Street Preacher – John Earl Jelks
- Mrs. Weston – Tonya Pinkins
- Griffy – Ben Thompson
- Nunn – Jahi Kearse

=== Principal roles and regional premier cast ===
Sources: Kenny Leon's True Colors Theatre Company

- John – Saul Williams
- Corinne – D. Woods
- Darius – Joshua Boone
- Anthony – Dyllon Burnside
- Vertus – Garrett Turner
- Street Preacher – Eddie Bradley, Jr
- Mrs. Weston – Theresa Hightower
- Griffy – Rob Lawhon
- Nunn – Jahi Kearse

== Songs ==
Source: Internet Broadway Database

Act 1

- "My Block" – John, Company
- "Dopefiend's Diner" – Vertus, My Block Chorus
- "Life Goes On" – Anthony, Darius, Nunn, Lemar, Reggie, My Block Chorus
- "I Get Around/Keep Ya Head Up" – Darius, Reggie, Lemar, Corinne, Kamilah, My Block Chorus
- "I Ain't Mad at Cha" – Vertus, John, My Block Women
- "Please Wake Me When I'm Free/The Rose That Grew From Concrete" – Corinne, Kamilah
- "Me Against The World" – John, Corinne
- "Whatz Next" – Vertus, Darius, Anthony, Corinne, My Block Chorus
- "Dear Mama" – Vertus, My Block Chorus
- "Holler If Ya Hear Me" – John, Anthony, Darius, My Block Chorus

Act 2

- "My Block (Reprise)" – Anthony, Darius
- "Changes" – John, Griffy, Vertus, Anthony, My Block Chorus
- "Resist The Temptation/Dear Mama (Reprise)" – Vertus, Mrs. Weston
- "Hail Mary" – John, Darius, Anthony, Young Souljas
- "Unconditional Love" – John, Corinne
- "I Ain't Mad at Cha (Reprise)" – John, Street Preacher
- "If I Die 2Nite" – Anthony, Darius, Reggie, Lemar, Young Souljas
- "Only God Can Judge Me" – Anthony
- "Thugz Mansion" – John, Vertus, Griffy
- "California Love" – Reggie, Lemar, Young Souljas, My Block Women
- "Ghetto Gospel" – Company

== Critical response ==
The show had mixed reviews.

Marilyn Stasio, in her review in Variety, wrote: "The true believers won't care about such pedestrian matters as the predictable book and clumsy characterizations...The music...is terrific.... But the performers are so overly miked that the lyrics are almost unintelligible....The other major drawback is that the story told in Todd Kreidler's book isn't the story we want to hear. It's not the life of Tupac Shakur.... it's the generic tale of a thug named John...who comes out of prison determined to go straight, only to be drawn back into the violent gang culture of the neighborhood by friends who demand his undying loyalty to the clan philosophy of life-as-war."

David Rooney, writing in Billboard, noted: "Critical response to the show was lukewarm. While many reviewers appreciated the attempt to stretch the jukebox musical format in new directions, going beyond the safe parameters of Baby Boomer hits, most found the story of racism, poverty, crime, violence, community and redemption mired in plot cliches and stock characters....It was apparent from the outset that not only was the show's marketing not working, but also that producers had made a mistake in bypassing the developmental opportunities of an out-of-town tryout and the fine-tuning window of a longer preview period."
