= Kara Young (actress) =

American actress

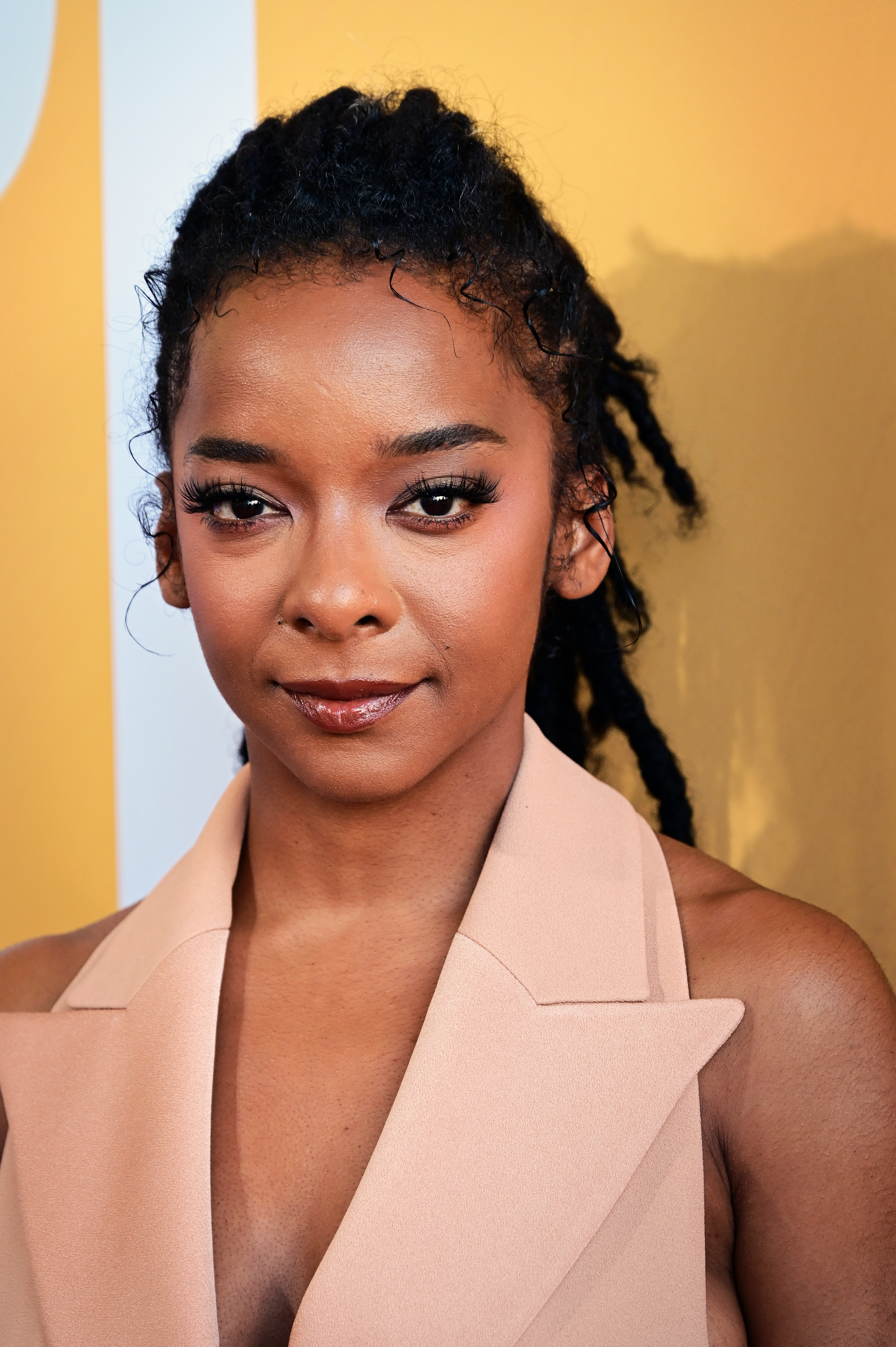
- Young in 2026
- Born: Kara Erin Young; Harlem, New York, U.S.
- Education: New York Conservatory for Dramatic Arts
- Occupation: Actress
- Years active: 2016–present

Kara Erin Young is an American actress. Known for her dynamic roles on stage both on Broadway and off-Broadway, she has received various accolades, including two Tony Awards, two Drama Desk Awards, an Outer Critics Circle Award, and an Obie Award. Having won the Tony Award for Best Featured Actress in a Play in 2024 and 2025, she is the first Black actress to be Tony-nominated in four consecutive years (2022, 2023, 2024, 2025) in that category, and the first Black actress to win two consecutive Tonys.

Young studied at the New York Conservatory for Dramatic Arts before making her stage debut in Patricia Ione Lloyd's play Pretty Hunger (2016) at the Public Theater. The following year, 2017, she joined the LAByrinth Theater Company. She gained acclaim for portraying Viola in the 2022 off-Broadway revival of William Shakespeare's romantic play Twelfth Night at the Classical Theatre of Harlem.

She won the Tony Award for Best Featured Actress in a Play in two consecutive years for playing a naive former servant in the Ossie Davis satirical play Purlie Victorious (2024) and a pregnant lesbian in the Branden Jacobs-Jenkins play Purpose (2025). She was Tony-nominated for her roles as a sandwich maker in Lynn Nottage's play Clyde's (2022) and a caretaker in Martyna Majok's dramatic play Cost of Living (2023).

== Early life and education ==
Young was born and raised in Harlem in New York City. In 1980 Both of her parents immigrated from Belize. Her father, Klay Young, began working in the Rainbow Room in 30 Rockefeller Plaza in 1992 as a server; he was later promoted to captain. (In 2022, Kara attended a special event there as a Tony Award nominee). Her mother worked in health administration at Bellevue Hospital.

Young had an interest in performing from the age of five, when she learned to mime in an afterschool program at the 92nd Street Y. She briefly went to Gettysburg College and the City College of New York before studying at the New York Conservatory for Dramatic Arts, where she graduated. She studied traditional theater in Thailand for a month in 2008.

== Career ==
Young joined the LAByrinth Theater Company in 2017. She has appeared off-Broadway in plays such as NSangou Njikam's Syncing Ink, Jonathan Payne's The Revolving Cycles Truly and Steadily Roll'd, Stephen Adly Guirgis's Halfway Bitches Go Straight to Heaven (a LAByrinth co-production), Jeff Augustin's The New Englanders, and C.A. Johnson's All the Natalie Portmans. A New York Times review of her starring role in All the Natalie Portmans said that Young "can fit what feels like a mountain of blood, heart, sinew and febrile emotional response into a frame that can't stretch past five feet". Young often plays characters much younger than herself, adolescents or even preadolescents, aided by her small size and wide-set eyes.

In November 2021, Young made her Broadway debut at the Hayes Theater playing a single mother, Letitia, in Lynn Nottage's play Clyde's. The Times called her performance "superb". At the 75th Tony Awards, she was nominated for Best Featured Actress in a Play for Clyde's.

In 2022, Young played a caregiver, Jess, in Martyna Majok's play Cost of Living at the Samuel J. Friedman Theatre on Broadway. At the 76th Tony Awards, she was again nominated for Best Featured Actress in a Play for Cost of Living. In 2023 she portrayed Lutiebell Gussie Mae Jenkins in the revival of the Ossie Davis play Purlie Victorious on Broadway, for which she won the Tony Award for Best Featured Actress in a Play in 2024. In 2025 she won the Best Featured Actress in a Play Tony Award for her work in Purpose, which made her the first black performer to win acting Tony Awards consecutively. Because she was previously nominated for that award, she was also the first black performer to get four consecutive Tony nominations.

In 2026, Young joined the cast of the Broadway revival of Proof as Claire, starring alongside Ayo Edebiri and Don Cheadle at the Booth Theatre. Young was cast as a last-minute replacement for Samira Wiley, who departed the production due to a medical condition. Young has stated that, due to the suddenness of her addition to the cast, she was only allowed five days of preparation prior to the beginning of technical rehearsals. Her performance was often cited as the strongest element of the show by critics. (Note: Attributed to multiple references:)

== Acting credits ==
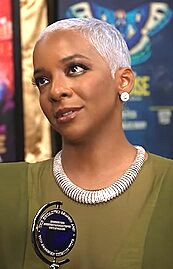
Kara Young at the 2024 Tony Awards

=== Film ===
Year	Title	Role	Director	Notes	Ref.
2018	Hair Wolf	Cami	Mariama Diallo	Short film	
2020	Chemical Hearts	La	Richard Tanne		
2020	King of Knives	Darla	Jon Delgado		
2021	After Yang	Erin	Kogonada	Uncredited	
2022	Master	Sascha	Mariama Dillo		
2022	F^¢k 'Em R!ght B@¢k	Yolanda	Harris Doran	Short film	
2023	Blow Up My Life	Charlie August	Abigail Horton / Ryan Dickie		
2024	We Strangers	Mari Winters	Anu Valia		
2026	I Love Boosters	Crying Black Mother	Boots Riley		
2026	Is God Is	Racine the Rough One	Aleshea Harris		

=== Television ===
Year	Title	Role	Notes	Ref.
2018	Random Acts of Flyness	Janelle	Episode: "They Got Some S**t That'll Blow Out Our Back"	
2019	The Other Two	VMA Announcer	Episode: "Chase Performs at the VMAs"	
2019	The Punisher	Wendy	2 episodes	
2020	Bite Size Halloween	Billie	Episode: "First Date"	
2022	The Staircase	Yasmine	2 episodes	
2023	I'm a Virgo	Jones	7 episodes	
2024	Great Performances	Lutiebell Gussie Mae Jenkins	Episode: "Purlie Victorious"	

=== Theater ===
Year	Title	Role	Venue	Ref.
2016	Pretty Hunger	Lea	The Public Theater	
2016	In the Event of My Death	Kate	IRT Theatre	
2017	Syncing Ink	Sweet Tea	Alley Theatre; The Flea Theater	
2018	The Revolving Cycles Truly and Steadily Roll'd	Karma	The Duke on 42nd Street	
2019	The New Englanders	Eisa	New York City Center	
2019	Halfway Bitches Go Straight to Heaven	Lil Melba Diaz	Linda Gross Theatre	
2020	All the Natalie Portmans	Keyonna	Susan and Ronald Frankel Theater	
2021–2022	Clyde's	Letitia	Hayes Theater, Broadway	
2022	Twelfth Night	Viola	Classical Theatre of Harlem	
2022	Cost of Living	Jess	Samuel J. Friedman Theatre, Broadway	'
2023–2024	Purlie Victorious	Lutiebell Gussie Mae Jenkins	Music Box Theater, Broadway	
2024	The Apiary	Zora	Tony Kiser Theatre, Off-Broadway	
2024	Syncing Ink	Sweet Tea	Victoria Theater, Off-Broadway	
2024	Table 17	Jada	MCC Theater, Off-Broadway	
2025	Purpose	Aziza	Hayes Theater, Broadway	
2025	Gruesome Playground Injuries	Kayleen	Lucille Lortel Theatre, Off-Broadway	
2026	Proof	Claire	Booth Theatre, Broadway	
2026	The Whoopi Monologues	Performer	Mitzi E. Newhouse Theatre, Off-Broadway	
2027	Mix and Master	TBA	Todd Haimes Theatre, Broadway	

== Awards and nominations ==
Organizations	Year	Category	Work	Result	Ref.
Actors' Equity Foundation	2022	Clarence Derwent Awards	Clyde's	Won	
Antonyo Awards	2019	Best Actor in a Play Off-Broadway	All the Natalie Portmans	Nominated	
Antonyo Awards	2022	Best Featured Actor in a Play (Broadway)	Clyde's	Nominated	
AUDELCO Awards	2020	Special Achievement Award		Won	
Dorian Awards	2025	Outstanding Featured Performance in a Broadway Play	Purpose	Nominated	
Drama Desk Awards	2022	Outstanding Featured Actress in a Play	Clyde's	Nominated	
Drama Desk Awards	2023	Outstanding Lead Performance in a Play	Cost of Living	Nominated	
Drama Desk Awards	2023	Outstanding Featured Performance in a Play	Twelfth Night	Nominated	
Drama Desk Awards	2024	Outstanding Featured Performance in a Play	Purlie Victorious	Won	
Drama Desk Awards	2025	Outstanding Featured Performance in a Play	Purpose	Won	
Drama Desk Awards	2026	Outstanding Lead Performance in a Play	Gruesome Playground Injuries	Nominated	
Drama League Awards	2024	Distinguished Performance	Purlie Victorious	Nominated	
Drama League Awards	2025	Distinguished Performance	Purpose / Table 17	Nominated	
Drama League Awards	2026	Distinguished Performance	Gruesome Playground Injuries / Proof	Nominated	
Innovative Theatre Awards	2017	Outstanding Actress in a Featured Role	In the Event of My Death	Nominated	
Lilly Awards	2022	Stacey Mindich Go Work in Theater Award		Won	
Lucille Lortel Awards	2020	Outstanding Lead Actress in a Play	All the Natalie Portmans	Nominated	
Lucille Lortel Awards	2025	Outstanding Lead Performer in a Play	Table 17	Won	
Lucille Lortel Awards	2026	Outstanding Lead Performer in a Play	Gruesome Playground Injuries	Nominated	
Obie Awards	2020	Performance	Twelfth Night	Won	
Outer Critics Circle Awards	2024	Outstanding Featured Performer in a Broadway Play	Purlie Victorious	Won	
Outer Critics Circle Awards	2025	Outstanding Featured Performer in a Broadway Play	Purpose	Nominated	
Tony Awards	2022	Best Featured Actress in a Play	Clyde's	Nominated	
Tony Awards	2023	Best Featured Actress in a Play	Cost of Living	Nominated	
Tony Awards	2024	Best Featured Actress in a Play	Purlie Victorious	Won	
Tony Awards	2025	Best Featured Actress in a Play	Purpose	Won	

== See also ==
- African-American Tony nominees and winners
- List of Tony Award records
