= It Ain't Nothin' but the Blues =

It Ain't Nothin' But the Blues
- Music: Various
- Lyrics: Various
- Book: Charles Bevel; Lita Gaithers; Randal Myler; Ron Taylor; Dan Wheetman
- Basis: An original idea by Ron Taylor
- Productions: 1999 Off Broadway; 1999 Broadway

It Ain't Nothin' But the Blues is a musical written by Charles Bevel, Lita Gaithers, Randal Myler, Ron Taylor, and Dan Wheetman. It was originally produced at The Denver Center for the Performing Arts and later presented by the Crossroads Theatre, in association with San Diego Repertory Theatre and Alabama Shakespeare Festival in New York City at the New Victory Theatre, Lincoln Center, and Broadway's Ambassador Theatre, where it garnered five Tony Award nominations, including Best Musical.

The musical traces the history of "blues" music with more than three dozen songs. Ron Taylor acted as singing narrator. It was directed by Randal Myler with movement by Donald McKayle.

It Ain't Nothin' But the Blues started as a Denver Center Theater Company school touring show in circa 1994. The Denver Center production played at the Arena Stage (Washington, D.C.), in November 1996. It subsequently opened in New York City at the New Victory Theater in March 1999 for a limited run, and then transferred to Broadway. It opened at the Vivian Beaumont Theater on April 26, 1999, transferred to the Ambassador Theatre on 9/7/1999, and ran until January 9, 2000, with 284 performances. It was nominated for five Tony Awards, including Best Musical, Best Book Of A Musical, Best Featured Actress (Gretha Boston) and Best Featured Actor ( Ron Taylor).

Subsequently, the show has been produced throughout the country.

== Cast ==
- "Mississippi" Charles Bevel
- Gretha Boston
- Carter Calvert
- Eloise Laws
- Gregory Porter
- Ron Taylor
- Dan Wheetman

On-stage 6-member band, musical director Dan Wheetman, with Debra Laws and Kevin Cooper on Bass Guitar

== Songs (partial) ==
Sources: The Washington Post, Lloyd Rose, D01, November 22, 1996 and Curtain Up review, April 1999

- "Come On in My Kitchen"
- "Black Woman"
- "Crawlin' King Snake"
- "Walkin' Blues"
- "Crossroad Blues"
- "I Can't Stop Loving You"
- "Dangerous Blues"
- "His Eye Is on the Sparrow"
- "Fever"
- "Someone Else is Stepping In"
- "Walking After Midnight"
- "Good-Night Irene"

== Awards and nominations ==
=== Original Broadway production ===
Year	Award	Category	Nominee	Result
1999	Tony Award	Best Musical		Nominated
1999	Tony Award	Best Book of a Musical	Charles Bevel, Lita Gaithers, Randal Myler, Ron Taylor, and Dan Wheetman	Nominated
1999	Tony Award	Best Performance by a Featured Actor in a Musical	Ron Taylor	Nominated
1999	Tony Award	Best Performance by a Featured Actress in a Musical	Gretha Boston	Nominated
1999	Drama Desk Award	Outstanding Revue		Nominated
1999	Drama Desk Award	Outstanding Featured Actor in a Musical	Ron Taylor	Nominated
1999	Drama Desk Award	Outstanding Featured Actress in a Musical	Gretha Boston	Nominated
1999	Drama Desk Award	Outstanding Featured Actress in a Musical	Eloise Laws	Nominated
