= Allen Lee Hughes =

African American lighting designer

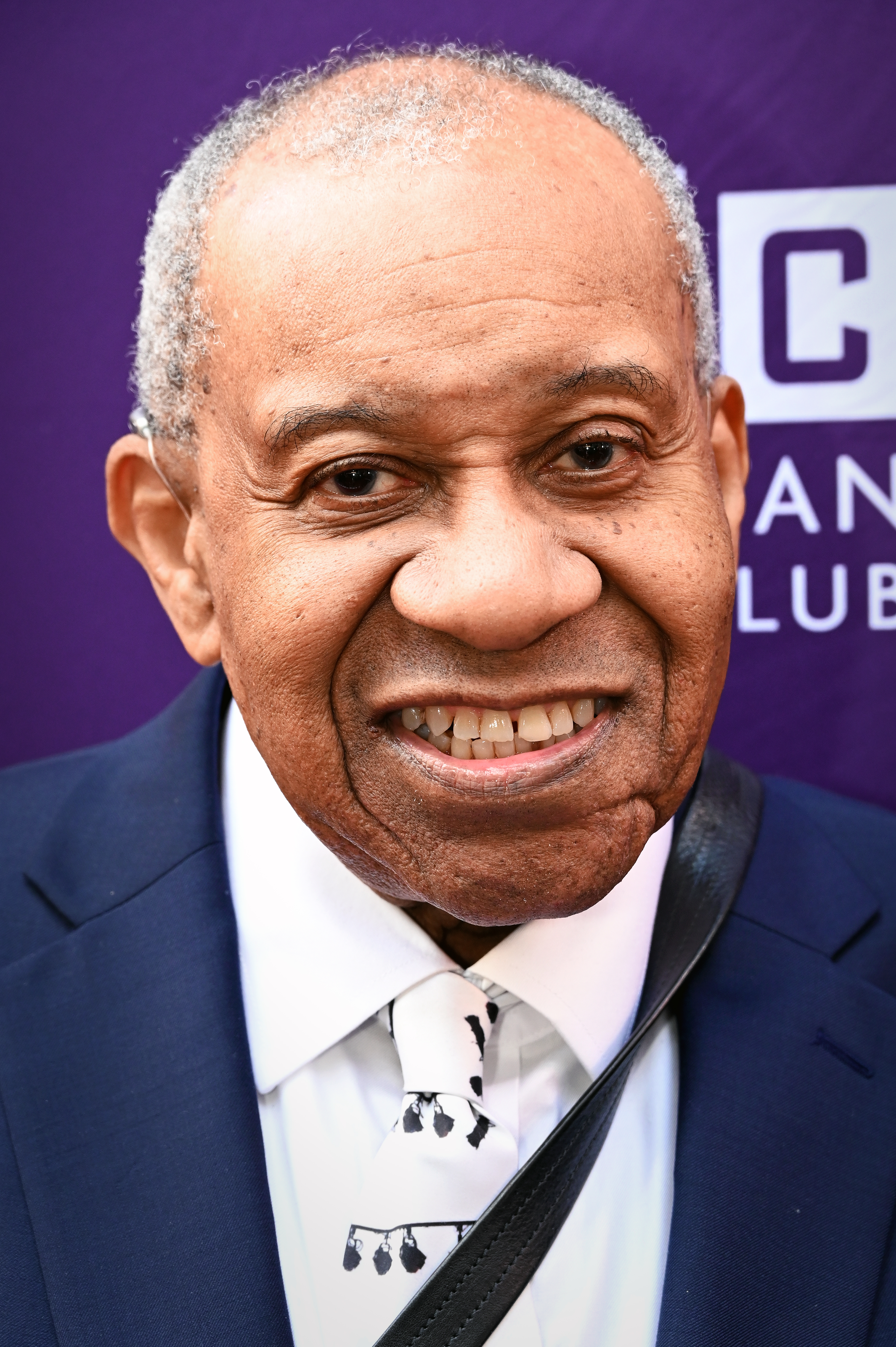
- Hughes in 2026
- Education: Catholic University (BFA); New York University Tisch School of the Arts (MFA)
- Notable work: K2, Original Broadway Production (1983); Strange Interlude, Broadway Revival (1985); Once on This Island, Original Broadway Production (1991); A Soldier's Play, Original Broadway Production (2020)
- Awards: - Maharam Design Award for Lighting Design, (Note: In 1999, the American Theatre Wing renamed the award after Henry Hewes.) 1983; - NBTF Outstanding Achievement in Lighting Design Award, 2015; - USITT Distinguished Achievement Award in Lighting Design, 2003; - The Henry Hewes Design Awards' Ming Cho Lee Lifetime Achievement Award, 2020

Allen Lee Hughes is an American lighting designer for theater, dance, and opera. He has a long association with Arena Stage in Washington, D.C., (Note: Where he has designed at least one show every season since 1979.) where the fellowship and internship program is named in his honor. Hughes is a four time Tony Award nominee.

== Biography ==
Hughes earned his BA at Catholic University of America and his MFA from New York University's Tisch School of the Arts Department of Design for Stage and Film, where he later joined the faculty and still teaches.

Beginning in 1983 Hughes has designed 12 shows on Broadway including the original production of Clybourne Park, the 2012 revival of Who's Afraid of Virginia Woolf?, and the original production of Once on This Island, for which he was nominated for a Tony Award. In her New York Times review, Roberta Smith noted that Hughes's "lighting adds effective suggestions of foliage or architecture, turning the painted blue sky to gold or red, or draining its color entirely" His most recent Broadway design of A Soldier's Play was also nominated for a Tony Award and shortlisted for Live Design's 2020 Design Achievement Awards. He also has done numerous designs Off-Broadway, at Regional theaters, and with numerous dance companies, including American Ballet Theatre, New York City Ballet, and National Ballet of Canada.

In 1990 the founding director of Arena Stage, Zelda Fichandler, created the Allen Lee Hughes Fellowship and Internship program to promote diversity with the theater industry. Since its founding, more than 700 people have been mentored, including Obie Award winning director Lileana Blain-Cruz.

Hughes has designed multiple lighting gobos for Rosco.

Hughes has been nominated for four Tony Awards (K2, Strange Interlude, Once on This Island, A Soldier's Play) and ten Helen Hayes Awards, winning twice. For K2, he was also nominated for the Drama Desk Award and won the Outer Critics Circle (Note: Joint winner with Ming Cho Lee as Best Set and Lighting Design.) and Maharam Design Awards. Other wins include the 2015 National Black Theatre Festival's Outstanding Achievement in Lighting Design Award, 2003 USITT Distinguished Achievement Award in Lighting Design, and the 1997 Merritt Award for Excellence in Design and Collaboration. On October 14, 2020, the American Theatre Wing's Henry Hewes Design Awards honored Hughes with the Ming Cho Lee Lifetime Achievement Award. The chair of awards committee, Jeffrey Eric Jenkins, remarked, "It is especially gratifying to honor Allen Lee Hughes, whose nearly five decades of work in lighting design demonstrates the power of light and shadow to strengthen the dramaturgical core of every production on which he works." He is the third recipient of the award, following Ming Cho Lee and Jane Greenwood.
