= Gretha Boston =

American singer and actress (born 1959)

- Born: Gretha Denise Boston; April 18, 1959 (age 67); Crossett, Arkansas, U.S.
- Occupations: Actress, singer
- Awards: Best Featured Actress in a Musical; 1995 Show Boat

Gretha Denise Boston (born April 18, 1959, Crossett, Arkansas) is an American singer and actress.

== Biography ==
Boston' s early musical training and experience was in the choir at Crossett High School and in the Gates Chapel African Methodist Episcopal Church. She graduated from North Texas State University (Denton, Texas), with a BA in music and performance, and then attended the University of Illinois at Urbana-Champaign.

Boston sang in the Manhattan Philharmonic concert performance of Mozart's "Coronation Mass" (K. 317) at Carnegie Hall in November 1990; she is described as a "mezzo-soprano."

Boston made her Broadway debut as "Queenie" in the revival of Show Boat, directed by Hal Prince, which opened at the Gershwin Theatre in October 1994. She won the Tony Award for Best Featured Actress in a Musical for her performance.

She was nominated for the 1999 Tony Award for Best Performance by a Featured Actress in a Musical for her performance in the original musical revue It Ain't Nothin' But the Blues, as well as the Drama Desk Award, Outstanding Featured Actress in a Musical.

She performed in the musical revue Let Me Sing -- A Musical Evolution at the George Street Playhouse, New Brunswick, New Jersey, in December 2002.

She appeared in the staged concert "Broadway By the Year, 1935" at Town Hall (New York City) in March 2004.

In January 2005 she appeared as "Velma" in Crowns by Regina Taylor at the Studio Theatre, Buffalo, New York. This production played at the Arena Stage, Washington, D.C., in July 2005.

She appeared in the revue 3 Mo' Divas! at the Arena Stage (Washington, D.C.) in July 2006.

According to The Washington Post "It was 'Show Boat' that Boston says caused her to "jump ship" and leave her classical roots for musical theater."
