= Clyde's (play) =

Play by Lynn Nottage

- Written by: Lynn Nottage
- Genre: Dramedy
- Setting: Truck Stop Diner

Premiere
- Date premiered: November 23, 2021
- Place premiered: Hayes Theater, New York City

Clyde's is a play by Lynn Nottage that opened on Broadway on November 23, 2021, and closed on January 16, 2022, at the Hayes Theater. The production was directed by Kate Whoriskey and starred Uzo Aduba, Ron Cephas Jones, Edmund Donovan, Reza Salazar, and Kara Young.

The play made its UK premiere at the Donmar Warehouse in October 2023.

== Plot summary ==
The story follows a group of formerly incarcerated employees at a truck stop diner, and one man's quest for the perfect sandwich.

== Simulcast ==
On November 22, 2021, Second Stage Theater announced that Clyde's would be live streamed from January 4 to 16 of 2022. It was captured by five to seven cameras mounted by Assemble Stream.

== Awards and nominations ==
=== Original Broadway production ===
Year	Award	Category	Nominee	Result
2022	Actors' Equity Foundation Awards	Clarence Derwent Award	Kara Young	Won
2022	Outer Critics Circle Awards	Outstanding New Broadway Play		Nominated
2022	Outer Critics Circle Awards	Outstanding Featured Actress in a Play	Uzo Aduba	Won
2022	Drama League Awards	Outstanding Production of a Play		Nominated
2022	Drama League Awards	Outstanding Direction Of A Play	Kate Whoriskey	Won
2022	Drama League Awards	Distinguished Performance Award	Uzo Aduba	Nominated
2022	Drama League Awards	Distinguished Performance Award	Ron Cephas Jones	Nominated
2022	Tony Awards	Best Featured Actor in a Play	Ron Cephas Jones	Nominated
2022	Tony Awards	Best Featured Actress in a Play	Uzo Aduba	Nominated
2022	Tony Awards	Best Featured Actress in a Play	Kara Young	Nominated
2022	Tony Awards	Best Costume Design in a Play	Jennifer Moeller	Nominated
2022	Tony Awards	Best Play		Nominated
2022	Drama Desk Awards	Outstanding Featured Actor in a Play	Ron Cephas Jones	Won
2022	Drama Desk Awards	Outstanding Featured Actress in a Play	Kara Young	Nominated
2022	Drama Desk Awards	Outstanding Set Design of a Play	Takeshi Kata	Won
2022	Drama Desk Awards	Outstanding Costume Design for a Play	Jennifer Moeller	Won
2022	Drama Desk Awards	Outstanding Lighting Design for a Play	Christopher Akerlind	Won

== Response ==
Clyde's was the most-produced play of the 2022–2023 American theater season per American Theatre.
