= Lamar Richardson =

Broadway and television producer

Lamar Richardson is an American Broadway, film, and television producer and actor. He is a three-time Tony Award-winning producer whose Broadway credits include Merrily We Roll Along, Appropriate, The Wiz, Gypsy, Othello, Smash, and Ragtime. Richardson has also appeared as an actor in television series including Law & Order: Special Victims Unit, Blue Bloods, FBI, New Amsterdam, The Better Sister, and Weird City.

== Early life and education ==
Richardson was born in New Brunswick, New Jersey, and raised in Charlotte, North Carolina. He is first-generation Caribbean American with his parents migrating from Antigua & Barbuda by way of St. Thomas, USVI to New Jersey in 1988. He earned a Bachelor of Arts from Columbia University in 2015, where he participated in the Black Theatre Ensemble in 2012 and started professionally pursuing an acting career in 2014. Phylicia Rashad discovered him in 2015 and cast him in her production of August Wilson's Ma Rainey's Black Bottom at the Mark Taper Forum in 2016.

== Career ==
Richardson began his entertainment career as an actor before transitioning into Broadway producing in 2022. His early producing credits included the 2022 Broadway revival of Death of a Salesman, followed by productions such as The Wiz, Merrily We Roll Along, Appropriate, Gypsy, Othello, Smash, and Ragtime.

He received two Tony Awards as a co-producer of Merrily We Roll Along and Appropriate in 2024, becoming the youngest Black producer to do this in one season. In 2026, Richardson served as a lead producer of the Broadway revival of Ragtime, which received multiple Tony Award nominations and wins. He made history as the youngest Black lead producer to win a Tony Award in a major category at age 33.

Beyond theater, Richardson has produced film and television projects and co-founded Ivy Lion Productions alongside his wife, Zaire Julion-Richardson, in 2022, an independent production company focused on stage and screen projects

In 2026, Richardson and Julion-Richardson hosted the inaugural Black Broadway Nominee Soirée during Tony Awards weekend, an event profiled by Vogue that celebrated Black Broadway artists and nominees.

== Filmography ==
=== Producer ===
- Death of a Salesman (2022)
- New York, New York (2023)
- Merrily We Roll Along (2023)
- The Wiz (2024)
- Appropriate (2024)
- Gypsy (2024)
- Othello (2025)
- Smash (2025)
- Ragtime (2025)
- The Hunger Games: On Stage (2025)
- Proof (2026)

=== Actor ===
- Law & Order: Special Victims Unit
- Blue Bloods
- FBI
- New Amsterdam
- The Better Sister
- Weird City

== Awards ==
Year	Production	Category	Result
2023	New York, New York	Best Musical	Nominated
2024	Merrily We Roll Along	Best Revival of a Musical	Won
2024	Appropriate	Best Revival of a Play	Won
2025	Gypsy	Best Revival of a Musical	Nominated
2026	Ragtime	Best Revival of a Musical	Won

All as Tony Awards.
