= Lita Gaithers =

American actress

Lita Gaithers Owens
- Born: July 30, 1956 (age 68); Tacoma, Washington, U.S.
- Occupation(s): Actress, singer
- Years active: 1983–present
- Website: litagaithersowens.com

Lita Gaithers (born July 30, 1956) is an American singer and actress. Lita, who received a nomination for the Tony Award for Best Book of a Musical, is the third of nine African American women who have been nominated in that category.

As a veteran performer of legitimate stages that include: the Mark Taper Forum, Pasadena Playhouse, and Arena Stage, her lead and featured stage performances consist of: The Tin Pan Alley Rag, Ain't Misbehavin', Nunsense, The Best Little Whorehouse in Texas, A... My Name Is Alice, Purlie, For Colored Girls Who Have Considered Suicide / When the Rainbow Is Enuf, and being an original cast member of Blues, which was developed at the Denver Center Theatre Company.

Lita is married to the Reverend Dr. Oscar Otis Owens Jr. and resides in View Park-Windsor Hills, California.
