= Purlie Victorious =

Play by Ossie Davis

- Broadway revival promotional poster
- Original language: English
- Written by: Ossie Davis
- Setting: The cotton plantation country of the Old South.

Premiere
- Date: 1961
- Place: Cort Theatre

Purlie Victorious (A Non-Confederate Romp through the Cotton Patch) is a three-act comedic stage play written by American actor Ossie Davis. It tells the fictional story of Reverend Purlie Victorious Judson, a dynamic traveling preacher returning to rural Georgia to save his small hometown church. The play—starring Davis himself in the title role—premiered on Broadway in 1961 and ran for 261 performances.

The play was revived on Broadway in 2023 at the Music Box Theatre directed by Kenny Leon, its first major New York production since the original production closed in 1962.

== Synopsis ==
The 2023 revival performs the show without intermission.

Act I

Purlie Victorious Judson returns to his small hometown in Georgia, with Lutiebelle Gussie Mae Jenkins and a plan to win back his family inheritance from Ol’ Cap’n Cotchipee, the plantation owner. Purlie’s dream is to buy back Big Bethel, the community’s church, so that he can preach freedom to the cotton pickers. Purlie shares his plan with his brother Gitlow and sister-in-law Missy, who despite their initial skepticism agree to help. Later that afternoon, in the back office of the village commissary, Idella is tending to Charlie, Ol’ Cap’n Cotchipee’s son, who got a black eye in a barroom brawl the previous night over his support of racial integration. Ol’ Cap’n Cotchipee does not share or respect his son’s progressive values and arrives to punish Charlie. Charlie distracts his father by delivering the cotton and commissary reports. Every negro family is in debt, and Charlie challenges his father’s “cheating” ways. Ol’ Cap’n becomes agitated, and Charlie holds his ground; Gitlow comes into the commisary and gives evasive answers when Ol' Cap'n asks him whether or not he joins Charlie in supporting racial integration. Ol’ Cap’n runs him off and then collapses due to the stress; Gitlow tries to comfort him by singing old spirituals.

Act II

It is time for Purlie’s plan. Gitlow lets Purlie and Lutiebelle into the back door of the commissary. Lutiebelle is dressed up as Purlie’s deceased Cousin Bee, whom she will pretend to be to win back the family inheritance. Purlie and Lutiebelle rehearse one last time before Ol’ Cap’n arrives. All does not go according to plan, but Purlie jumps in and wins Ol’ Cap’n over with flattery. Ol' Cap'n agrees to give the money, but when he asks Lutiebelle to sign a receipt, Lutiebelle accidentally signs her real name, rather than signing as Cousin Bee. This exposes their ruse, and a fight ensues. The sheriff is called, but Purlie and Lutiebelle escape.

Two days later, Purlie returns to Missy and Gitlow’s shack. Idella is there looking for Charlie, who is missing. Missy thanks her for getting Ol’ Cap’n to drop the charges against Purlie and encourages Purlie to ask Lutiebelle to marry him. He is determined to get his Church back. Gitlow returns bragging that he has secured the $500 inheritance from Ol’ Cap’n, in exchange for Lutiebelle working at the house. Purlie fumes. Lutiebelle enters in a disheveled state. Ol’ Cap’n has cornered her in the pantry. Furious, Purlie heads up to the house to confront Ol’ Cap’n.

Act III

Later that night, Lutiebelle and Missy wait at the shack for Purlie to return. Gitlow arrives without news. He suspects Purlie has fled rather than confront Ol’ Cap’n. Lutiebelle and Missy worry. Finally, Purlie returns with $500 and Ol’ Cap’n’s bull whip. Purlie tells the others how he sought vengeance on Ol’ Cap’n. The others celebrate his victory until Idella arrives and reveals the truth about how Purlie has secured the money. During a final confrontation with Ol' Cap'n, it is revealed that when Charlie purchased Big Bethel, against his father's orders, he registered the deed in Purlie's name, shocking Ol' Cap'n into dying of a heart attack.

Epilogue

The play concludes with Purlie at the pulpit in Big Bethel during a funeral for Ol' Cap'n, offering a unique and heartfelt blessing for unity and freedom for all.

== Notable casts ==
Character	Broadway	Broadway Revival
Character	1961	2023
Purlie Victorious Judson	Ossie Davis	Leslie Odom Jr.
Lutiebell Gussie Mae Jenkins	Ruby Dee	Kara Young
Charley Cotchipee	Alan Alda	Noah Robbins
Ol' Cap'n Cotchipee	Sorrell Booke	Jay O. Sanders
Gitlow Judson	Godfrey Cambridge	Billy Eugene Jones
Missy Judson	Helen Martin	Heather Alicia Simms
Idella Landy	Beah Richards	Vanessa Bell Calloway
The Deputy	Roger C. Carmel	Noah Pyzik
The Sheriff	Ci Herzog	Bill Timoney

=== Understudies ===
==== 1961 Broadway Production ====
- Melvin Stewart, standby for Purlie Victorious Judson and Gitlow Judson
- Gail Fisher, standby for Lutiebelle Gussie Mae Jenkins
- Mervyn Williams, standby for Ol' Cap'n Cotchipee
- Gloria Foster, standby for Idella Landy and Missy Judson
- Michael Lord, standby for Charley Cotchipee and The Deputy
- John Sillings, standby for The Sheriff

==== 2023 Broadway Production ====
- Donald Webber Jr., standby for Purlie Victorious Judson
- Brandi Porter, standby for Lutiebelle Gussie Mae Jenkins
- Melvin Abston, standby for Gitlow Judson
- Willa Bost, standby for Missy Judson and Idella Landy
- Bill Timoney, understudy for Ol' Cap'n Cotchipee
- Noah Pyzik, understudy for Charlie Cotchipee and The Sheriff
- The role of The Deputy is cut if Pyzik is indisposed or on for an understudy track.

== History ==
The play premiered in 1961 on Broadway, initially at the Cort Theatre, before finishing out its 261-performance run at the Longacre Theatre. The production was nominated for one Tony Award for Godfrey Cambridge in the category Best Featured Actor in a Play. The production was directed by Howard da Silva, produced by Philip Rose, and costumed by Ann Roth. Martin Luther King Jr. was photographed with the cast after attending a performance, as they celebrated the play's 100th performance.

After the first New York production closed in May 1962, Davis and Dee took the play on tour, presenting it in Chicago July 9 through August 5, 1962 at the Edgewater Beach Playhouse.

A filmed version of the play, titled Gone Are the Days! was released in 1963. Davis, Dee, Cambridge, Richards, Alda, and Brooke reprised their roles from the Broadway production.

In 1970, with little involvement from Davis, his play was turned into a Broadway musical, titled Purlie. The production was well received and was nominated for five Tony Awards including Best Musical.

In 2002, an industry reading was held by Davis and theater producer Jeffrey Richards, with Ruby Dee in the role of Idella Landy, Harold Perrineau ("Oz") as Purlie Victorious, Kerri Washington as Lutiebelle Gussie Mae Jenkins, George Grizzard as Ol' Cap'n Cotchipee, Robert Sella as Charley Cotchipee, Erick Devine as the Sheriff, Andrew McGinn as the Deputy, Doug E. Doug as Gitlow and Whoopi Goldberg as Missy Judson.

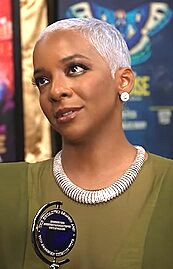
Kara Young accepts the 2024 Tony Award for Best Featured Actress in a Play for her performance as Lutiebelle Gussie Mae Jenkins in the 2023 Broadway Revival of Purlie Victorious.

The play was revived on Broadway in a production directed by Kenny Leon that stars Leslie Odom Jr., Kara Young, and Vanessa Bell Calloway. It began previews at the Music Box Theatre on September 7, 2023 and officially opened on September 27 for a limited engagement through January 7, 2024. It was later extended through February 4. The Broadway revival's scenery and costumes were designed by Derek McLane and Emilio Sosa, respectively; lighting and sound by Adam Honoré and Peter Fitzgerald; and produced by Jeffrey Richards, Hunter Arnold, Leslie Odom Jr., and Louise Gund.

== Televised performance ==
A television capture of the 2023 Broadway Revival was filmed at the Music Box Theatre on January 23, 2024, and aired on May 24, 2024 as part of the PBS Great Performances series, with the original 2023 Broadway cast. Producer and cast member Leslie Odom Jr. was responsible for initiating the process and funding most of the production costs.

== Critical reception ==
The 2023 Broadway revival received critical acclaim.

Jesse Green of The New York Times wrote, "The Purlie Victorious that opened on Wednesday at the Music Box—unaccountably its first Broadway revival—is every bit as scathingly funny as the 1961 reviews said it was", referencing Howard Taubman's initial 1961 review calling the play "exhilarating," "uninhibited" and "uproarious," all in the first three paragraphs.

Tim Teeman of The Daily Beast wrote, "Ossie Davis' Purlie Victorious (A Non-Confederate Romp Through the Cotton Patch) is both uproarious satire and cultural gut punch—with the biggest clue in its lead character's name and the play's title."

Greg Evans of Deadline praised the casting, stating "Starring a magnificent Leslie Odom, Jr., in the title role, and featuring equally fine performances by an enchanting Kara Young, Billy Eugene Jones, Vanessa Bell Calloway and more, Purlie Victorious [...] has been given an urgent—and, oh yes, very, very funny—revival by Leon and his top-notch creative team.

== Accolades ==
=== 1961 Broadway production ===
Year	Award	Category	Nominee	Result	Ref.
1961	Tony Awards	Best Featured Actor in a Play	Godfrey Cambridge	Nominated	

=== 2024 Broadway revival ===
Year	Award	Category	Nominee	Result	Ref.
2024	Tony Awards	Best Revival of a Play		Nominated	
2024	Tony Awards	Best Direction of a Play	Kenny Leon	Nominated	
2024	Tony Awards	Best Performance by a Leading Actor in a Play	Leslie Odom Jr.	Nominated	
2024	Tony Awards	Best Performance by a Featured Actress in a Play	Kara Young	Won	
2024	Tony Awards	Best Scenic Design of a Play	Derek McLane	Nominated	
2024	Tony Awards	Best Costume Design of a Play	Emilio Sosa	Nominated	
2024	Drama League Awards	Outstanding Revival of a Play		Nominated	
2024	Drama League Awards	Distinguished Performance	Leslie Odom Jr.	Nominated	
2024	Drama League Awards	Distinguished Performance	Kara Young	Nominated	
2024	Outer Critics Circle Awards	Outstanding Revival of a Play		Nominated	
2024	Outer Critics Circle Awards	Outstanding Featured Performer in a Broadway Play	Billy Eugene Jones	Nominated	
2024	Outer Critics Circle Awards	Outstanding Featured Performer in a Broadway Play	Kara Young	Won	
2024	Outer Critics Circle Awards	Outstanding Direction of a Play (Broadway of Off-Broadway)	Kenny Leon	Nominated	
2024	New York Drama Critics' Circle Awards	Special Citation		Honored	
2024	Broadway.com Audience Choice Awards	Favorite Performance of the Year (Play)	Leslie Odom Jr.	Won	
2024	Broadway.com Audience Choice Awards	Favorite Leading Actor in a Play	Leslie Odom Jr.	Won	

== See also ==
- Gone Are the Days! - 1963 film version of the play
