= Frank Pietri =

American jazz instructor, choreographer, and performer (1934–2020)

Frank Pietri (born Francisco Pietri; July 6, 1934 — March 26, 2020) was an American choreographer and performer in New York City.

== History ==
The Ponce, Puerto Rico-born son of Amalia Vega and Dr Augustin Pietri, Frank Pietri's career spanned more than four decades. A protégé of Matt Mattox, he appeared as a member of the original casts of numerous Broadway musicals, including Ballroom, Seesaw, and Promises, Promises, choreographed by Michael Bennett, I Remember Mama, Golden Rainbow, What Makes Sammy Run?, Wildcat, and Destry Rides Again. He choreographed, directed, and appeared in television shows, nightclub acts, industrials, cruise ships, and films, including Woody Allen's Everyone Says I Love You.

Pietri was on faculty at Matt Mattox School, Morelli School of Dance, Ballet Hispanico School, Peridance Center, Joe Davis Dance Center, Joyce Trisler Dance Studio, Dance Concepts, Inc., Marymount College and New Dance Group Arts Center. As a guest teacher, Pietri took his Free-Style Jazz Technique throughout the U.S. and Europe. He taught at New Dance Group until its closure in February 2009, and also taught at Roy Arias studios in New York City.
