= Promises, Promises (original Broadway cast recording) =

Promises, Promises – Original Broadway Cast Album

Cast recording by the original Broadway cast
- Released: 1969
- Label: United Artists

Promises, Promises, subtitled Original Broadway Cast Album, is an album containing a recording of the 1968 Broadway musical Promises, Promises made by its original cast. The album was released by United Artists Records in 1969.

== Background ==
The album was recorded at A&R Studios in New York City.

== Critical reception ==
Professional ratings
Review scores
Source	Rating
AllMusic	3.5/5 stars

In her retrospective review on AllMusic, Jenna Woolford notes: "The songs include several of Bacharach–David's best, including "I'll Never Fall in Love Again [...] and the title song.".

== Chart performance ==
The album reached number 95 on the Billboard's Top LPs chart.

== Track listing ==
LP – United Artists UAS 9902

All lyrics are written by Hal David; all music is composed by Burt Bacharach.

Side 1
No.	Title	Artist(s)	Length
1.	"Overture"	Orchestra
2.	"Half as Big as Life"	Jerry Orbach
3.	"Upstairs"	Jerry Orbach
4.	"You'll Think of Someone"	Jerry Orbach, Jill O'Hara
5.	"Our Little Secret"	Jerry Orbach, Edward Winter
6.	"She Likes Basketball"	Jerry Orbach
7.	"Knowing When to Leave"	Jill O'Hara
8.	"Wanting Things"	Edward Winter
9.	"Turkey Lurkey Time"	Donna McKechnie, Margo Sappington, Baayork Lee

Side 2
No.	Title	Artist(s)	Length
1.	"A Fact Can Be a Beautiful Thing"	Jerry Orbach, Marian Mercer
2.	"Grapes of Roth"	Orchestra
3.	"Whoever You Are"	Jill O'Hara
4.	"Where Can You Take a Girl?"	Paul Reed, Norman Shelly, Vince O'Brien, Dick O'Neill
5.	"Christmas Day"	Edward Winter, Kay Oslin, Rita O'Connor, Juliane Stites, Neil Jones
6.	"A Young Pretty Girl like You"	Jerry Orbach, A. Larry Haines
7.	"I'll Never Fall in Love Again"	Jill O'Hara, Jerry Orbach
8.	"Promises, Promises"	Jerry Orbach

== Personnel ==
- Henry Jerome – producer
- Phil Ramone – associate producer

== Charts ==
Chart (1969)	Peak position
US Billboard Top LPs	95

== Awards ==
Year	Award type	Categories	Results	Ref.
1970	Grammy Awards	Best Cast Show Album	Won	
