= Bob Avian =

American dancer (1937–2021)

- Born: December 26, 1937
- Died: January 21, 2021 (aged 83)

Robert Avedisian (December 26, 1937 – January 21, 2021), professionally known as Bob Avian, was an American choreographer, theatrical producer and director.

== Biography ==
Born in New York City to an Armenian family in December 1937, Avian spent his early career dividing his time between dancing in such Broadway shows as West Side Story, Funny Girl, and Henry, Sweet Henry and working as a production assistant on projects like I Do! I Do! and Twigs. He first met Michael Bennett when they both appeared in the European tour of West Side Story in 1959, and over the course of the next two decades the two collaborated on Promises, Promises, Coco, Company, Follies, Seesaw, God's Favorite, A Chorus Line, Ballroom, and Dreamgirls, Avian's first credit as a solo producer. Additional Broadway credits include Putting It Together, Nowhere to Go But Up and the 2006 revival of A Chorus Line, which he directed.

In London's West End, Avian choreographed Follies, Martin Guerre, The Witches of Eastwick, Miss Saigon, and Sunset Boulevard, repeating the assignment for the Broadway productions of the latter two. He also staged Hey, Mr. Producer!, the Cameron Mackintosh tribute.

== Personal ==
Avian was openly gay and survived by his husband Peter Pileski, and his sister, Laura Nabedian.

== Awards and nominations ==
Awards

- 1976 Drama Desk Award for Outstanding Choreography – A Chorus Line
- 1976 Tony Award for Best Choreography – A Chorus Line
- 1979 Drama Desk Award for Outstanding Choreography – Ballroom
- 1979 Tony Award for Best Choreography – Ballroom
- 1997 Laurence Olivier Award for Best Choreography – Martin Guerre

Nominations

- 1979 Tony Award for Best Musical – Ballroom
- 1982 Drama Desk Award for Outstanding Musical – Dreamgirls
- 1982 Tony Award for Best Musical – Dreamgirls
- 1991 Tony Award for Best Choreography – Miss Saigon
- 1995 Tony Award for Best Choreography – Sunset Boulevard
