= Thommie Walsh =

American dancer, choreographer, and director (1950–2007)

- Born: Thomas Joseph Walsh III; March 15, 1950; Auburn, New York, USA
- Died: June 16, 2007 (aged 57); Auburn, New York, USA
- Occupations: Choreographer; dancer; director; author
- Website: http://www.thommiewalsh.com

Thomas Joseph "Thommie" Walsh III (March 15, 1950 – June 16, 2007) was an American dancer, choreographer, director, and author.

== Biography ==
Thommie Walsh was born in Auburn, New York, and began to study dance at age five at the Irma Baker School of Dance. When Irma retired, Thommie traveled to Syracuse NY weekly to continue his dance training under David Shields. After high school, he majored in Dance and minored in Musical Theater at the Boston Conservatory of Music from 1968 - 1971, but left during his junior year, with an associates degree, to tour with Disney on Parade.

He joined the national tour of Applause, starring Lauren Bacall, and the company of The Ann-Margret Las Vegas Show. He was in the film version of Jesus Christ Superstar as the apostle Thaddeus. Walsh made his Broadway debut in the chorus of Seesaw in 1973. Also in 1973 he appeared in the flop Rachael Lily Rosenbloom (And Don't You Ever Forget It), which starred Ellen Greene and Anita Morris, and did not officially open on Broadway after 7 previews.

=== A Chorus Line ===
In 1975, Walsh was invited by choreographer Tony Stevens to participate in a series of frank conversations among Broadway dancers, known as "gypsies," about their experiences, hopes, and dreams. The result was Michael Bennett's A Chorus Line, in which he originated the role of Bobby. The musical opened on Broadway on July 25, 1975. The role of Bobby was in large part based on his life and also used material from a comedy stand-up routine he used at the time. (Samples: "I thought about killing myself, but then I realized to commit suicide in Buffalo is redundant." and "I used to break into people's houses. I didn't steal anything; I'd just rearrange their furniture.") He co-wrote a book with Baayork Lee, another Chorus Line cast member, about the musical's origins and evolution, entitled On the Line, published by William Morrow in 1990.

=== Choreography and direction ===
Walsh soon left his dancing career to concentrate on choreography, musical staging, and direction. His credits include The Best Little Whorehouse in Texas (1978 and 1982) with Chorus cast member Pam Blair, The 1940's Radio Hour (1979), A Day in Hollywood/A Night in the Ukraine (1980), with Chorus cast member Priscilla Lopez, Do Black Patent Leather Shoes Really Reflect Up? (1982), Nine (1982), My One and Only (1983) with Chorus cast member Ron Dennis, Marilyn: An American Fable (1983), and My Favorite Year (1992).

He received the Tony and Drama Desk Awards for his choreography in A Day in Hollywood/A Night in the Ukraine and My One and Only which also earned him a Tony nomination for best direction.

He went on to direct Lucky Stiff Off-Broadway in 1988 the musical Always in 1997 (West End debut), and A Broadway Baby at Goodspeed Opera House in 1984.

With such a developed reputation in the industry, Walsh was brought in as a show doctor on many of Broadway's shows during the 1980s, such as The Grand Tour, Black and Blue, The Tap Dance Kid; he also choreographed many numbers in Grand Hotel.

Walsh has also directed and staged musical numbers for Chita Rivera, Sandy Duncan, Mitzi Gaynor, Donna McKechnie, Whoopi Goldberg, Lorna Luft, Priscilla Lopez, Joel Grey, Barbara Cook, and Julie Budd.

Walsh also directed and choreographed many commercials such as the NY Lottery, Perdue Chicken, Crush, and MCI. Walsh's last direction and choreography before his death was the national tour of The Best Little Whorehouse in Texas starring Ann-Margret and Gary Sandy.

At the time of his death, he was working on a musical adaptation of A Tale of Two Cities as choreographer, for a Broadway opening. Much of his work was done in collaboration with Tommy Tune, including The Best Little Whorehouse in Texas.

He also was a judge for Miss America, Danny Hoctor's Dance Caravan and Stars of Tomorrow in conjunction with the Professional Dance Teachers Association.

The last show Thommie directed was Greetings from Yorkville, which opened off Broadway on October 4, 2007, and ran through November 11, 2007, post Thommie's death in June.

== Personal life ==
Thommie Walsh died on June 16, 2007, at his Auburn, New York, home from lymphoma at age 57. On Friday May 18, 2018, Thommie became the first person inducted posthumously into the Auburn Alumni Hall of Distinction. Thommie is survived by his sister Barbara Walsh, who is also an avid supporter of the arts. Thommie's hometown theater, The Rev Theater Co. (formerly the Finger Lakes Musical Theater Festival at the Merry-Go-Round Playhouse) created the Thommie Walsh Memorial Scholarship in 2018. The scholarship is given to an Auburn native who wishes to pursue a career in the performing arts. The theater has brought in friends of Thommie's, including Julie Budd, Michele Lee, Lucie Arnaz, and Tommy Tune, who have performed concerts to raise money for the scholarship fund.

== Awards and nominations ==
Awards

- 1976 Theatre World Award for Ensemble Performance – A Chorus Line
- 1980 Tony Award for Outstanding Choreography – A Day in Hollywood /A Night in the Ukraine
- 1980 Drama Desk Award for Outstanding Choreography – A Day in Hollywood/A Night in the Ukraine
- 1983 Tony Award for Outstanding Choreography – My One And Only
- 1983 Drama Desk Award for Outstanding Choreography- My One And Only

Nominations

- 1982 Tony Award for Outstanding Choreography – Nine
- 1983 Tony Award for Outstanding Direction of a Musical – My One And Only

== Bibliography ==
- Viagas, Robert; Lee, Baayork; Walsh, Thommie (1990). On the Line: The Creation of a Chorus Line (First ed.). New York: William Morrow. ISBN 0-688-08429-X.
