= Promises, Promises (musical) =

Broadway musical (1968–1972)

- 2010 Revival Logo
- Music: Burt Bacharach
- Lyrics: Hal David
- Book: Neil Simon
- Basis: The Apartment by Billy Wilder; I. A. L. Diamond
- Productions: 1968 Broadway; 1969 West End; 1970 US Tour; 1993 Goodspeed; 1997 Encores! 2008 Reading; 2010 Broadway revival 2014 San Francisco
- Awards: Drama Desk Award for Outstanding Music

Promises, Promises is a musical with music by Burt Bacharach, lyrics by Hal David and a book by Neil Simon. It is based on the 1960 film The Apartment, written by Billy Wilder and I. A. L. Diamond. The story concerns a junior executive at an insurance company who seeks to climb the corporate ladder by allowing his apartment to be used by his married superiors for trysts.

The musical premiered in 1968 on Broadway with choreography by Michael Bennett and direction by Robert Moore. It starred Jerry Orbach as Chuck Baxter and Jill O'Hara as Fran Kubelik. It closed after 1,281 performances. A West End production opened in 1969 featuring Tony Roberts and Betty Buckley. The cast album was nominated for the Grammy Award for Best Musical Theater Album, and two songs from the show (the title tune and "I'll Never Fall in Love Again") became hit singles for Dionne Warwick.

== Productions ==
=== Broadway (1968–1972) ===
After a tryout at the National Theatre in Washington, D.C., and the Colonial Theatre in Boston, MA. the show premiered on Broadway at the Shubert Theatre on December 1, 1968, and closed on January 1, 1972, after 1,281 performances. Directed by Robert Moore, and choreographed by Michael Bennett with Bob Avian as assistant choreographer, the cast featured Jerry Orbach as Chuck Baxter, Jill O'Hara as Fran Kubelik, and Edward Winter as J. D. Sheldrake. Featured in small or ensemble roles were Kelly Bishop, Graciela Daniele, Ken Howard, Baayork Lee, Donna McKechnie, Frank Pietri, Margo Sappington, and Marian Mercer. A national tour starring Tony Roberts from the West End production as Chuck Baxter, Melissa Hart as Fran, and Bob Holiday as Sheldrake performed throughout the United States during the early 1970s. Lorna Luft played Fran Kubelik on Broadway from October 1971 to January 1972. A second national tour starred Will Mackenzie as Chuck Baxter, Sydnee Balaber as Fran Alan North as Dr. Dreyfuss; featured ensemble players included Trudi Green, Laurent Giroux, Guy Allen, Dennis Grimaldi, Brandt Edwards, Cheryl Clark and Patti McKenzie. Another tour starred Donald O'Connor as Chuck Baxter, Betty Buckley as Fran Kubelik, and Barney Martin as Dr. Dreyfuss; featured ensemble players included Laurent Giroux, Carla Lewis, Cheryl Clark, Deborah Henry and Dennis Grimaldi.

The show's now-iconic first act closing dance number, "Turkey Lurkey Time", underwent significant changes from its initial debut. According to McKechnie, who portrayed Miss Della Hoya, the original choreography was staged on three desks pushed together, and was meant to reflect what the three secretaries might realistically have choreographed in their living rooms. During the first night of the show's Boston tryouts, the number was extremely poorly received by the audience. Bennet and Avian immediately reworked the choreography that same night in their hotel room, changing it from its initial realistic approach into its subsequent, high-energy form. The number has been described as a cult classic, and is one McKechnie described in her 2006 memoir as "incredibly athletic" and designed to secure the audience's return after the intermission, despite the number having little to do with the musical's overall plot.

=== West End (1969) ===
The show was first produced in London's West End at the Prince of Wales Theatre in 1969, featuring Tony Roberts and Betty Buckley. It ran for 560 performances.

=== Broadway revival (2010–2011) ===
A reading for a revival of the musical was held in October 2008 with Sean Hayes and Anne Hathaway.

The revival opened at the Broadway Theatre on April 25, 2010, after previews starting on March 27. Directed and choreographed by Rob Ashford, the revival starred Hayes, Kristin Chenoweth, Brooks Ashmanskas, Katie Finneran, and Tony Goldwyn. The Bacharach-David songs "I Say a Little Prayer", a 1967 million-selling hit written for Dionne Warwick, and "A House Is Not a Home" were added to the score.

Due to pregnancy, Katie Finneran departed the role of Marge on October 10, 2010, and was replaced by Saturday Night Live veteran Molly Shannon. Hayes, Chenoweth, and Shannon remained with the production until its closing on January 2, 2011. The show had 291 performances and 30 previews.

=== Other productions ===
Regional theatre productions have included a 1993 staging at the Goodspeed Opera House in Connecticut. New York City Center Encores! held a staged concert in March 1997, starring Martin Short, Kerry O'Malley, Eugene Levy, Dick Latessa, and Christine Baranski.

2014 San Francisco

The musical opened at San Francisco Playhouse in November 2014 and closed in January 2015. It featured Jeffrey Brian Adams in the role of Chuck and Monique Hafen as Fran.

2017 Southwark Playhouse, London

This production ran from January to February, directed by Bronagh Lagan with Gabriel Vick in the role of Chuck and Daisy Maywood as Fran.

== Synopsis ==
=== Act I ===
Chuck Baxter is an ambitious bachelor and junior executive for a large insurance company, Consolidated Life, who expresses his frustrations and hopes for career advancement ("Half as Big as Life"). To curry favor with higher-ups in the company, he allows his apartment to be used for their romantic trysts in return for promises of promotion ("Upstairs"). Chuck has his own eye set on Fran Kubelik, a waitress in the company cafeteria whom he's always admired from a distance. While talking together she wonders if she will ever find someone to share her life with. Chuck hopes that she might notice him ("You'll Think of Someone").

J.D. Sheldrake, the company's powerful personnel director, notices the glowing reviews written by Chuck's superiors and deduces the reason for them. He requests sole use of the apartment for his affairs in exchange for Chuck's long-awaited promotion and tickets to a basketball game ("Our Little Secret"). (In the 2010 revival, the song "I Say a Little Prayer For You" was added for a scene in which Fran tells female workmates about flowers she has received from a new "mystery individual".) Chuck asks Fran to attend the basketball game with him, and she agrees to meet him there after first having a drink with her soon-to-be ex-lover ("She Likes Basketball").

Fran's lover turns out to be the married Sheldrake. Fran wants to end the relationship, but Sheldrake talks her into spending the evening with him ("Knowing When to Leave"). Though Fran stands him up, Chuck forgives her. When he informs the other executives that his apartment is no longer available for their use, they express dismay ("Where Can You Take a Girl?"). Meanwhile, Sheldrake wonders why he is drawn to affairs ("Wanting Things"). The scene shifts to the company Christmas party, where everyone is enjoying themselves ("Turkey Lurkey Time"). Miss Olsen, Sheldrake's secretary, reveals to Fran that she is simply the latest in a long line of Sheldrake's mistresses. The first-act curtain falls as Fran is driven to misery ("A House is Not a Home" in the 2010 revival), and Chuck discovers that Fran is the one Sheldrake has been taking to his apartment.

=== Act II ===
A despondent Chuck spends Christmas Eve trying to drink away his troubles at a bar, where he meets another tipsy lonelyheart, Marge MacDougall, who agrees to come back to his apartment ("A Fact Can Be a Beautiful Thing"). In the meantime, at Chuck's apartment, Fran confronts Mr. Sheldrake about his earlier affairs. While he admits to the affairs, he declares his love for Fran, but tells her that he must leave in order to catch his train home to spend Christmas Eve with his family. A despairing Fran discovers Chuck's sleeping pills and takes the whole bottle ("Whoever You Are").

When Chuck arrives with Marge, he discovers Fran on his bed. After quickly disposing of Marge, a frantic Chuck gets his neighbor, Dr. Dreyfuss, to come over and together they save her life. The next morning Chuck calls Sheldrake to let him know what happened. Sheldrake says he can't leave for the city without his wife knowing and asks Chuck to take care of Fran ("Christmas Day").

Over the next few days Chuck and Dreyfuss try to keep Fran's spirits up to prevent a relapse into suicidal behavior ("A Young Pretty Girl Like You"). Chuck and Fran play gin rummy and discuss their problems, growing closer ("I'll Never Fall In Love Again"). Mr. Kirkeby, one of Chuck's former 'clients', discovers that Fran has been staying at Chuck's apartment, so as revenge for cutting him and the others off from using the apartment he tells Fran's overly protective brother where she has been staying. Karl Kubelik then comes to the apartment to collect her, and believing that Chuck is the cause of her current state he punches Chuck.

Miss Olsen soon discovers that Sheldrake's actions led to Fran almost killing herself. She quits her job and tells Mrs. Sheldrake all about her husband's affairs. She leaves him, resulting in his desperation to woo Fran back. Sheldrake asks for the keys to Chuck's apartment again on New Year's Eve to take Fran there. Chuck refuses and quits his job rather than allow Sheldrake to take Fran to his apartment ever again ("Promises, Promises").

Deciding that he has to get away, Chuck begins packing to move elsewhere when Fran comes to see him. Sheldrake had told her that Chuck had refused him access and quit, and she realizes that Chuck is the one who really loves her. As they resume their earlier game of gin, he declares his love for her, to which she replies, "Shut up and deal".

== Characters ==
- Chuck Baxter – An office worker
- Fran Kubelik – A restaurant waitress
- J.D. Sheldrake – A personnel manager
- Dr. Dreyfuss – A neighbor
- Marge MacDougall – A bar acquaintance
- Dobitch, Kirkeby, Eichelberger, and Vanderhof
- Vivien Della Hoya, Miss Polansky, and Miss Ginger Wong
- Karl – Fran's brother
- Mrs. Sheldrake
- Miss Olsen

== Casts (1960s-1970s) ==
Character	Original Broadway Production	Original West End Production	US National Tour	The Muny Production	US National Tour	US Regional Tour	Kenley Players Production	Paper Mill Playhouse Production	Music Fair Circuit Production	Darien Dinner Theatre Production
Character	1968-1972	1969-1971	1970-1971	1970	1971-1972	1972	1973			1978
Chuck Baxter	Jerry Orbach	Tony Roberts	Tony Roberts	Jerry Orbach	Will Mackenzie	Donald O'Connor	Rich Little	Bill Hinnant	Frank Gorshin	Doug Carfrae
Fran Kubelik	Jill O'Hara	Betty Buckley	Melissa Hart	Jill O'Hara	Syndee Balaber	Betty Buckley	Christine Andreas	Jill Corey	Susan Long	Meg Bussert
J.D. Sheldrake	Edward Winter	James Congdon	Bob Holiday	Edward Winter	Mace Barrett	Mark Dempsey	Terence Monk	Jerry Lanning	Peter Lombard	William McCauley
Dr. Dreyfuss	A. Larry Haines	Jack Kruschen	Jack Kruschen	Alan North	Norman Shelley	Barney Martin	David Doyle	Joe Silver	Alan North	Woody Romoff
Marge MacDougall	Marian Mercer	Kelly Britt	Kelly Britt	Kay Oslin	Channing Chase	Kelly Britt	Jane A. Johnston	Channing Chase	Janie Kelly	Rita Gardner
Mr. Dobitch	Paul Reed	Ronn Carroll	David Sabin	Paul Reed	J. Michael Bloom	J. Michael Bloom	Earl Rice	Alex Reed	John Anania	Douglas Fisher
Mr. Kirkeby	Norman Shelly	Jay Denyer	Larry Douglas	Ronn Carroll	Thomas Boyd	Joseph Dooley	Charles Cagle	—N/a	Joseph Endes	Tom Savage
Mr. Eichelberger	Vince O'Brien	Ivor Dean	Tom Batten	Henry Sutton	Thomas Ruisinger	Thomas Ruisinger	John Bernabei	Edward Penn	Leonard Parker	Marc Jordan
Jesse Vanderhof	Dick O'Neill	Don Fellows	Barney Martin	Dick O'Neill	Zale Kessler	Vince O'Brien	Zale Kessler	—N/a	Thomas Boyd	Austin Colyer
Miss Vivien Della Hoya	Donna McKechnie	Donna McKechnie	Julane Stites	Baayork Lee	Patricia Cope	—N/a	Pia Zadora	—N/a	—N/a	—N/a
Miss Polansky	Margo Sappington	Miranda Willis	Joyce Driscoll	Barbara Alston	B. J. Hanford	—N/a	Stephanie Gotowiec	—N/a	—N/a	—N/a
Miss Ginger Wong	Baayork Lee	Susi Pink	Gayle Crofoot (as Miss Blackwell)	Pamela Blair	Trudie Green (as Miss Blackwell)	—N/a	Suzie Swanson	—N/a	—N/a	—N/a
Peggy Olsen	Millie Slavin	Angela Norvik	Diane Findlay	Millie Slavin	Kathie Kallaghan	—N/a	Elizabeth Shelle	—N/a	Beryl Towbin	Colleen Dodson

=== Notable Replacements ===
==== Original Broadway Production (1968–1972) ====
- Chuck Baxter: Tony Roberts
- Fran Kubelik: Jenny O'Hara, Lorna Luft, Margo Sappington (u/s), Ilene Graff (u/s)
- Marge MacDougall: Mary Louise Wilson
- Mr. Dobitch: Dick O'Neill
- Mr. Kirkeby: Ronn Carroll
- Mr. Eichelberger: Ronn Carroll (u/s)
- Jesse Vanderhof: Don Fellows
- Miss Vivien Della Hoya: Baayork Lee, Lada St. Edmund

==== Original West End Production (1969–1971) ====
- Chuck Baxter: Bob Sherman
- Fran Kubelik: Dilys Watling
- J.D. Sheldrake: Paul Maxwell
- Dr. Dreyfuss: Bernard Spear
- Marge MacDougall: Julia McKenzie
- Mr. Dobitch: John Blythe
- Mr. Eichelberger: Terence Soall
- Jesse Vanderhof: Kevin Lindsay

==== US National Tour (1970–1971) ====
- Chuck Baxter: Anthony 'Scooter' Teague
- Dr. Dreyfuss: Barney Martin (u/s)
- Peggy Olson: Annette Charles (u/s)

==== US National Tour (1971–1972) ====
- Fran Kubelik: Ilene Graff
- J.D. Sheldrake: Bob Holiday
- Dr. Dreyfuss: Barney Martin
- Marge MacDougall: Elaine Cancilla Orbach

== Casts (1980s-2020s) ==
Character	Equity Library Theatre Revival	The MUNY Production	The Melody Top Theatre Production	Las Vegas Production	Birmingham, Michigan Production	Goodspeed Musicals Production	Encores! Production	Reprise Theatre Company Production	US Mini Tour	Broadway Revival
Character	1983			1985	1987-1988	1993	1997		2001	2010-2011
Chuck Baxter	Gordon Lockwood	John James	Desi Arnaz Jr.	Frank Gorshin	Barry Williams	Evan Pappas	Martin Short	Jason Alexander	Evan Pappas	Sean Hayes
Fran Kubelik	Beth Leavel	Susan Powell	Ann Arvia	Marleta Marrow	Sarah Combs	Juliet Lambert	Kerry O'Malley	Karen Fineman	Kelli Rabke	Kristin Chenoweth
J.D. Sheldrake	Lew Resseguie	Terence Monk	Ray McLeod	Joe Bellomo	Mark Jacoby	P. J. Benjamin	Terrence Mann	Alan Thicke	Paul Schoeffler	Tony Goldwyn
Dr. Dreyfuss	Larry Hirschhorn	Bernie Landis	David Perkovich	Louis Schaefer	Bernard Granville	Joe Palmieri	Dick Latessa	Barney Martin	Gordon Stanley	Dick Latessa
Marge MacDougall	C.J. Critt	Paige Massman	Susan Rush	Belle Calaway	Alison Bevan	Marilyn Pasekoff	Christine Baranski	Jean Smart	Beth Glover	Katie Finneran
Mr. Dobitch	Leslie Feagan	Frank Echols	James Michael	—N/a	Robert Lydiard	Avery Saltzman	Eugene Levy	Charlie Robinson	Daren Kelly	Brooks Ashmanskas
Mr. Kirkeby	Ron Wisniski	Dale Young	Leigh Catlett	—N/a	Tim Ewing	John Deyle	Samuel E. Wright	Paul Kreppel	Rod Weber	Peter Benson
Mr. Eichelberger	Paul F. Hewitt	Michael Sartor	Donald Mark	—N/a	James Hindman	Michael Cone	Joe Grifasi	Alan Rachins	Michael Hayward-Jones	Seán Martin Hingston
Jesse Vanderhof	Peter J. Saputo	Gene Mildon	Clarence M. Sheridan	—N/a	Bill Tatum	Steve Pudenz	Ralph Byers	Fred Willard	James Darrah	Ken Land
Miss Vivien Della Hoya	Mimi Quillin	Jayne Cacciatore	Reisa Sperling	—N/a	—N/a	Elizabeth S. Steers	Carol Lee Meadows	Anne Fletcher	Krissy Richmond	Cameron Adams
Miss Polansky	Tara Tyrrell	Peggy Millard	Michelle O'Steen	—N/a	—N/a	Cynthia Ann Khoury	Mary Ann Lamb	Jill Matson	Carol Schuberg	Megan Sikora
Miss Ginger Wong	Chris Reisner	—N/a	Dawn Merrick	—N/a	—N/a	Kayoko Yoshioka	Cynthia Onrubia	Kristie Canavan	Pauline A. Locsin	Mayumi Miguel
Peggy Olsen	Kathleen Conroy	Nancy Holcombe	Linda Leonard	—N/a	—N/a	Laurie Sheppard	Jenifer Lewis	Linda Hart	Brenda Braxton	Helen Anker

=== Notable Replacements ===
==== Melody Top Theatre Production (1983) ====
- Chuck Baxter: Gary Collins

==== Broadway Revival (2010–2011) ====
- Fran Kubelik: Megan Sikora (u/s)
- Marge MacDougell: Molly Shannon, Megan Sikora (u/s)

== Musical numbers ==
Act One

- "Overture" – Orchestra
- "Half as Big as Life" – Chuck
- "Grapes of Roth" – Orchestra
- "Upstairs" – Chuck
- "You'll Think of Someone" – Chuck & Fran
- "Our Little Secret" – Chuck & Sheldrake
- "I Say a Little Prayer"+ – Fran
- "She Likes Basketball" – Chuck
- "Knowing When to Leave" – Fran
- "Where Can You Take a Girl?" – Dobitch, Kirkeby, Eichelberger, & Vanderhof
- "Wanting Things" – Sheldrake
- "Turkey Lurkey Time" – Miss Della Hoya, Miss Polansky, Miss Wong, & Ensemble
- "A House Is Not a Home"+ – Fran

Act Two

- "A Fact Can Be a Beautiful Thing" – Marge & Chuck
- "Whoever You Are (I Love You)" – Fran
- "Christmas Day" – Orchestra
- "A House Is Not A Home (reprise)"+ – Chuck
- "A Young Pretty Girl Like You" – Dr. Dreyfuss & Chuck
- "I'll Never Fall in Love Again" – Chuck & Fran
- "Promises, Promises" – Chuck
- "I'll Never Fall In Love Again (reprise)" – Chuck & Fran

+ Added for the 2010 revival

Songs cut in the out-of-town tryouts included: "Tick Tock Goes The Clock," "We Did The Right Thing," "Loyal, Resourceful And Cooperative," "Wouldn't That Be A Stroke Of Luck," "Hot Food," "What Am I Doing Here?"

Songs written for the show but not used included: "Let's Pretend We're Grown Up," "Phone Calls," "In The Right Kind Of Light."

== Reception ==
From The New York Times: "Though the work featured memorable dance sequences by a choreographer on the rise named Michael Bennett, what really set it apart was its score, written by the solid-gold pop composer Burt Bacharach with lyrics by Hal David. Mr. Bacharach introduced to Broadway not only the insistently rhythmic, commercial-jingle buoyancy of 1960's soft-core radio fare, but also a cinematic use of Teflon-smooth, offstage backup vocals."

== Recordings ==
- Promises, Promises – Original Broadway Cast Album, a 1969 album containing a recording of the musical made by its original 1968 Broadway cast
- Promises, Promises – The New Broadway Cast Recording, a 2010 album containing a recording of the musical made by its 2010 Broadway revival cast

== Awards and nominations ==
=== Original Broadway production ===
Year	Award	Category	Nominee	Result
1969	Tony Award	Best Musical		Nominated
1969	Tony Award	Best Performance by a Leading Actor in a Musical	Jerry Orbach	Won
1969	Tony Award	Best Performance by a Leading Actress in a Musical	Jill O'Hara	Nominated
1969	Tony Award	Best Performance by a Featured Actor in a Musical	Larry Haines	Nominated
1969	Tony Award	Best Performance by a Featured Actor in a Musical	Edward Winter	Nominated
1969	Tony Award	Best Performance by a Featured Actress in a Musical	Marian Mercer	Won
1969	Tony Award	Best Direction of a Musical	Robert Moore	Nominated
1969	Tony Award	Best Choreography	Michael Bennett	Nominated
1969	Drama Desk Award	Outstanding Music	Burt Bacharach	Won
1969	Drama Desk Award	Outstanding Performance	Marian Mercer	Nominated
1969	Drama Desk Award	Outstanding Performance	Jerry Orbach	Won
1969	Theatre World Award		Jill O'Hara	Won
1969	Theatre World Award		Marian Mercer	Won
1969	Grammy Award	Best Musical Theatre Album	Burt Bacharach	Won

=== 2010 Broadway revival ===
Year	Award	Category	Nominee	Result
2010	Tony Award	Best Performance by a Leading Actor in a Musical	Sean Hayes	Nominated
2010	Tony Award	Best Performance by a Featured Actress in a Musical	Katie Finneran	Won
2010	Tony Award	Best Choreography	Rob Ashford	Nominated
2010	Tony Award	Best Orchestrations	Jonathan Tunick	Nominated
2010	Drama Desk Award	Outstanding Revival of a Musical		Nominated
2010	Drama Desk Award	Outstanding Featured Actress in a Musical	Katie Finneran	Won
2010	Drama Desk Award	Outstanding Sound Design	Brian Ronan	Nominated
2010	Outer Critics Circle Award	Outstanding Revival of a Musical (Broadway or Off-Broadway)		Nominated
2010	Outer Critics Circle Award	Outstanding Actor in a Musical	Sean Hayes	Nominated
2010	Outer Critics Circle Award	Outstanding Featured Actor in a Musical	Dick Latessa	Nominated
2010	Outer Critics Circle Award	Outstanding Featured Actress in a Musical	Katie Finneran	Won
2010	Outer Critics Circle Award	Outstanding Choreographer	Rob Ashford	Nominated
2011	Grammy Award	Best Musical Show Album		Nominated

== In popular culture ==
The title song, "Whoever You Are (I Love You)" and "Wanting Things" were all featured on Dionne Warwick's Scepter LP Promises, Promises which was released in 1968 before the show opened on Broadway. "I'll Never Fall in Love Again" was a hit for Dionne Warwick in the US (No. 6) and for Bobbie Gentry in the UK (No. 1). "Christmas Day" was recorded by Johnny Mathis for his Christmas album Give Me Your Love for Christmas (1969). The title song and "Turkey Lurkey Time" were featured on Glee and the latter performed in Camp.
