= God's Favorite =

Play by Neil Simon

God's Favorite is a play by Neil Simon, loosely based on the Biblical Book of Job. It was produced on Broadway in 1974.

== Production ==
Produced by Emanuel Azenberg, the play opened on Broadway at the Eugene O'Neill Theatre on December 11, 1974 and closed on March 23, 1975, after 119 performances and seven previews. Directed by Michael Bennett with Assistant Director Bob Avian, the cast featured Vincent Gardenia (Joe Benjamin), Maria Karnilova (Rose Benjamin), and Charles Nelson Reilly (Sidney Lipton). Scenic design was by William Ritman, costumes were by Joseph G. Aulisi and lighting was by Tharon Musser.

== Plot overview ==
The setting of the play is a Long Island mansion. The household consists of a pious, God-fearing tycoon named Joe Benjamin and his family: a long-suffering wife, Rose, a prodigal son, David, a pair of unique and quirky twins, Ben and Sarah, and the maid and butler, Mady and Morris. One night a messenger from God, Sidney Lipton (with a big G on his sweatshirt) arrives, and, as in the biblical story, goes through all manner of temptations to get Joe Benjamin to renounce God. When he refuses, he is visited by all the afflictions imaginable. He stands firm and the messenger has to admit defeat.

== Reception ==
Clive Barnes, in his review for The New York Times wrote:

... this may be Mr. Simon's most imaginative play, it is not one of his better works. Not only is the opening slow, but also the ending is anticlimactic. If you have exploited tragedy for its humor, how do you get around a happy ending? ... More than any other Simon play, God's Favorite depends heavily on its staging and setting. Michael Bennett's direction lets all God break loose. ... William Ritman's collapsing mansion is some of the most fiendish theatrical real estate we have seen in years.

Thomas S. Hischak (Professor of Performing Arts, SUNY Cortland) wrote that Simon had been writing about "serious issues" in his last several plays, but "stumbled awkwardly" with God's Favorite. Hischak described the play as a "modern version of the story of Job that moved into schtick the closer it edged to genuine grief". Hischak noted that Simon had said that the play was written "as a reaction to his wife's untimely death from cancer".

The pre-production of God's Favorite was chronicled on a January 1975 edition of the CBS News program 60 Minutes.
