= Thanksgiving (Glee) =

- Glee episode
- Episode no.: Season 4 Episode 8
- Directed by: Bradley Buecker
- Written by: Russel Friend; Garrett Lerner
- Production code: 4ARC08
- Original air date: November 29, 2012

Guest appearances
- Sarah Jessica Parker as Isabelle Wright; Jayma Mays as Emma Pillsbury; Dianna Agron as Quinn Fabray; Vanessa Lengies as Sugar Motta; Alex Newell as Wade "Unique" Adams; Samuel Larsen as Joe Hart; Melissa Benoist as Marley Rose; Jacob Artist as Jake Puckerman; Blake Jenner as Ryder Lynn; Becca Tobin as Kitty Wilde; Trisha Rae Stahl as Millie Rose; Dean Geyer as Brody Weston; Grant Gustin as Sebastian Smythe; Nolan Gerard Funk as Hunter Clarington

Episode chronology
← Previous "Dynamic Duets"	Next → "Swan Song"
- Glee season 4

"Thanksgiving" is the eighth episode of the fourth season of the American musical television series Glee, and the seventy-fourth episode overall. Written by Russel Friend and Garrett Lerner, and directed by Bradley Buecker, it aired on Fox in the United States on November 29, 2012. The episode features the return of many of the New Directions graduates to help in coaching the current glee club for Sectionals competition, which takes place on Thanksgiving, and the reappearance of special guest star Sarah Jessica Parker as Isabelle Wright, Kurt's boss in New York City.

== Plot ==
Quinn Fabray (Dianna Agron), Santana Lopez (Naya Rivera), Mercedes Jones (Amber Riley), Mike Chang (Harry Shum, Jr.) and Noah "Puck" Puckerman (Mark Salling) return to Lima to celebrate Thanksgiving and join interim glee club director Finn Hudson (Cory Monteith) in a mash-up performance of "Homeward Bound" and "Home" in the school auditorium. Afterwards, Finn asks each of the graduates to mentor one of the new members of New Directions in order to prepare for Sectionals, which will once again be held at McKinley.

Mike is partnered with Ryder Lynn (Blake Jenner), Puck is partnered with his brother, Jake Puckerman (Jacob Artist), Mercedes is partnered with Wade "Unique" Adams (Alex Newell), Quinn is partnered with Kitty Wilde (Becca Tobin) and Santana is partnered with Marley Rose (Melissa Benoist). In order to beat their rivals, the Dalton Academy Warblers, known for their elaborate dance choreographies, Finn decides to have New Directions perform "Gangnam Style".

Ryder agrees to no longer romantically pursue Marley now that she is dating Jake. In return, Jake helps Ryder be selected as one of the number's lead dancers alongside Sam Evans (Chord Overstreet), despite being a better dancer than Ryder. Meanwhile, Kitty convinces Quinn, whom she idolizes, that Jake is pressuring Marley into having sex with him. Quinn becomes hostile towards Jake, partially due to her previous experience with Puck.

Quinn, Santana and Brittany Pierce (Heather Morris) perform "Come See About Me" for the female members of New Directions, reminding them to use their strengths in the competition. After the performance, Santana confronts Quinn about having discovered that Kitty has given Marley laxatives in order to further Marley's bulimia. Quinn, who is dating one of her teachers at Yale, accuses Santana of being jealous of her and projecting her hostility in their surrogates, leading to a fight before Quinn storms out of the choir room.

In New York City, Rachel Berry (Lea Michele) confronts Brody Weston (Dean Geyer) over having sex with Rachel's enemy, dance instructor Cassandra July. Brody reminds Rachel that she ignored him once Finn briefly appeared in NYC, and recognizing her mistake, she invites him to celebrate Thanksgiving with her and Kurt Hummel (Chris Colfer), who also invites his boss, Isabelle Wright (Sarah Jessica Parker). Isabelle brings her friends to Rachel and Kurt's apartment, where they end up having a party, performing a mash-up of "Let's Have a Kiki" and "Turkey Lurkey Time". Isabelle advises Kurt to call his ex-boyfriend Blaine Anderson (Darren Criss), and they have a heartfelt conversation, in which Kurt agrees to meet during Christmas to decide what will become of their relationship.

At Sectionals, the Warblers, led by Hunter Clarington (Nolan Gerard Funk) and Sebastian Smythe (Grant Gustin), perform "Whistle" and "Live While We're Young". Meanwhile, Marley begins to feel sick due to starvation and anxiety. Hoping to relieve the pressure, Ryder agrees to give up the lead dancer position to Jake, and New Directions successfully performs "Gangnam Style", with Finn, Quinn, Santana, Mercedes, Mike, Puck, Will Schuester (Matthew Morrison), Emma Pillsbury (Jayma Mays) and Sue Sylvester (Jane Lynch) in the audience. However, Marley collapses on the stage seconds before their first song is finished.

== Production ==
Special guest star Sarah Jessica Parker returns as Vogue.com editor-in-chief Isabelle Wright. Recurring guest stars include McKinley's guidance counselor Emma Pillsbury (Jayma Mays), McKinley High alum Quinn Fabray (Dianna Agron), The Dalton Academy Warblers members Hunter Clarington (Nolan Gerard Funk) and Sebastian Smythe (Grant Gustin), glee club members Sugar Motta (Vanessa Lengies), Joe Hart (Samuel Larsen), Wade "Unique" Adams (Alex Newell), Marley Rose (Melissa Benoist), Jake Puckerman (Jacob Artist), Kitty Wilde (Becca Tobin) and Ryder Lynn (Blake Jenner), NYADA junior Brody Weston (Dean Geyer), and McKinley's lunch lady and Marley's mother Mrs. Rose (Trisha Rae Stahl). Shangela Laquifa Wadley, from Seasons 2 and 3 of RuPaul's Drag Race appears as one of Isabelle Wright's friends and party guests.

This episode includes six songs, three of which were released as singles, while the other three were released on the soundtrack album Glee: The Music, Season 4, Volume 1. The songs released as singles include a mash-up of Scissor Sisters' "Let's Have a Kiki" and "Turkey Lurkey Time" from the Broadway musical Promises, Promises performed by special guest star Sarah Jessica Parker with Lea Michele and Chris Colfer, the Supremes' "Come See About Me" by Dianna Agron, Naya Rivera and Heather Morris, and Flo Rida's "Whistle" performed by the Dalton Academy Warblers. Songs released on the soundtrack album include a mashup of Simon & Garfunkel's "Homeward Bound" and Phillip Phillips' "Home" performed by Agron, Rivera, Cory Monteith, Harry Shum, Jr., Amber Riley and Mark Salling, One Direction's "Live While We're Young" performed by the Warblers, and Psy's "Gangnam Style" performed by Jenna Ushkowitz and New Directions. For "Gangnam Style", all the cast, none of whom speak Korean, had to each learn how to sing the lyrics phonetically.

== Reception ==
=== Ratings ===
The episode was watched by 5.39 million viewers with a 2.2/6 rating/share among adults 18-49. 2.74 million viewers watched the episode via DVR, bringing the total viewership to 8.14 million viewers.

=== Music performances ===
In December 2012, TV Guide listed the "Gangnam Style" rendition as one of Glee's worst performances.
