= Megan Sikora =

American actress (born 1979)

- Born: April 11, 1979 (age 47); Pittsburgh, Pennsylvania, U.S.
- Education: Point Park University (BA)
- Occupations: Actress, dancer
- Spouse: Barrett Martin
- Website: www.megansikora.com

Megan Sikora (born April 11, 1979) is an American actress and dancer who has appeared on Broadway in several musicals. She originated the role of Bambi Bernet in Curtains in 2007.

== Early life ==
Sikora grew up in Pittsburgh, Pennsylvania. She began dancing at age three, and she attended Point Park University, where she earned a B.A. in dance. At age 19, she joined the cast of the German version of Beauty and the Beast and toured Germany and Austria. She was selected as one of the American women to dance ballet at the 1998 Winter Olympics in Nagano.

== Career ==
Sikora debuted on Broadway in 42nd Street in 2001 as Lorraine/Ensemble.

She appeared in other shows such as Thoroughly Modern Millie in 2002 as Ruth/Ensemble, Wonderful Town, Dracula, and Wicked, where she understudied Glinda and Nessarose. In 2007, she reached her breakthrough when cast as the determined dancing fanatic Bambi Bernet in the Broadway musical Curtains. She appeared on Broadway and the Los Angeles out of town tryout as well.

She appeared in the Broadway revival of Promises, Promises opposite Kristin Chenoweth in 2010. In March 2011, she played the role of Miss Krumholtz in the Broadway revival of How to Succeed in Business Without Really Trying. She was nominated for the 2011 Astaire Award, Female Dancer, Broadway for this role. She played the role of Joan and others and was the dance captain in the Broadway production of The Nance in 2013.

Sikora played Lila Dixon in the musical Holiday Inn, which opened on Broadway in October 2016. For her performance, she won the 2017 Chita Rivera Award for Outstanding Female Dancer in a Broadway Show.

== Personal life ==
Sikora is married to actor Barrett Martin, whom she met while performing in Wicked. They have a son, named Elliot.

== Theatre credits ==
Year	Title	Role	Notes
2000	The Wild Party	Peggy	Off-Broadway
2001	42nd Street	Lorraine / Ensemble	Broadway
2002	Thoroughly Modern Millie	Ruth / Ensemble	Broadway
2003	Wicked	Ensemble; u/s Glinda and Nessarose	Broadway
2003	Wonderful Town	Greenwich Villager	Broadway
2004	Dracula, the Musical	Swing; u/s Lucy Westenra and Mina Murray	Broadway
2005	On the Twentieth Century	Ensemble	Broadway
2007	Curtains	Bambi Benet	Broadway
2010	Promises, Promises	Miss Polansky / Nurse / Sylvia Gilhooley; u/s Fran Kubelik and Marge MacDougall	Broadway
2011	How to Succeed in Business Without Really Trying	Miss Krumholtz; u/s Hedy La Rue, Miss Jones, and Smitty	Broadway
2013	The Nance	Joan / Carmen / Rose	Broadway
2014	Under My Skin	Nanette	Off-Broadway
2016	Holiday Inn	Lila Dixon	Broadway
2017	Church and State	Sara Whitmore	Off-Broadway
2018	Clueless	Miss Geist / Ms. Stoeger	Off-Broadway
2019	Chick Flick the Musical	Dawn	Off-Broadway
2019	#DateMe: An OkCupid Experiment	Woman 1	Off-Broadway
