= Equity Library Theatre =

The Equity Library Theatre (ELT) was a New York City theatre company active from 1943 until 1989.

== The original company ==
Founded in 1943 by Sam Jaffe, representing Actors' Equity, and George Freedley, at the time curator of the New York Public Library Theatre Collection, Equity Library Theatre was designed to provide a showcase for young actors, directors, and technicians and to create an audience from among those who could not afford commercial theatre. A non‐profit organization, it originally presented its plays at libraries and charged no admission but asked instead for a contribution to help sustain it. Beginning in 1949, it operated its own theatre, first at the Lenox Hill Playhouse and later at other auditoriums. Financial problems forced its closure during the 1989–90 season.

Since its founding, some 12,000 actors, directors, and stage technicians have worked for no pay in more than 600 company productions at Equity Library Theatre. The theater's philosophy was to mount nonprofit productions to provide exposure for actors seeking paying roles in commercial shows. Because a substantial number of actors obtained future paid acting jobs as a result of their appearances, as many as 700 people would show up to audition for each production. Actors who performed at the ELT early in their careers include Martin Balsam, John Cazale, Danny DeVito, Lee Grant, James Earl Jones, Richard Kiley, Sidney Poitier, Tony Randall, Jason Robards, Jean Stapleton, Rod Steiger, Nathan Lane, Dann Florek, John Goodman, Georgia Engel, Marin Mazzie, Dennis Grimaldi, Jamie Widdoes, and Virginia Seidel.

== The new Equity Library Theater ==
New York playwright and director Johnny Culver resurrected the name and ideals of ELT and currently provides new playwrights a chance to present their works in New York City library performance spaces, in a casual play festival format, at no cost to anyone. Many up-and-coming New York actors have performed with the new Equity Library Theater. The company performs at the New York Public Library's George Bruce Theater on West 125th street and at the Alvin Ailey Auditorium on West 115th Street. ELT holds an annual new play festival, free for all to participate. As of 2020, ELT has premiered more than 200 new plays.

In 2014, ELT produced a reading of David Garrick's Catherine and Petruchio, a rarely-performed 18th Century adaptation of Shakespeare's The Taming of the Shrew, as well as a presentation of short plays by John Ladd and KK Gordon. In 2015, they presented a reading of short plays by writers from the Provincetown Playhouse and other early 20th century NYC writers, including Overtones by Alice Gerstenberg, as well as a new play by Pamela Robbins, and a staged reading of The Father. The Village Light Opera Guild joined them for a musical cabaret in 2016 as a benefit. In December 2016, they presented Songs of My Father, short plays written by fathers of celebrated New York actors, and in early 2017, a reading of a screenplay by Tom Meade.

ELT has also created a "spinoff" company, the Woodside Players of Queens, which presents rare short plays from late-19th century Broadway at Queens Public Library branches. The Woodside Players produced a staged reading of Keep Calm, Camilla, a Broadway comedy from 1918, in the fall of 2017 at the ELT space at the Harry Belafonte branch of the NYPL. In December of that year, ELT presented a comedy by Cricket Daniel, The Night Before the Night Before Christmas, at the new NYPL branch on West 53rd Street. In 2018, ELT produced a reading of The Retreat by Enzo Gattuccio, Aunt Maggie's Will from 1910, and in the fall of 2018, a reading of a play by Carol Hollenbeck (Holland).The Woodside Players have been nominated for several Josephine awards and won last year for best director.

2019 and 2020 have been busy for ELT, with their online summer play festival, live and virtual readings, free online writing classes, and a new group, Fifth Avenue Theatre of New York, geared towards local (NYC) writers and their works. More information and events can be seen at www.equitylibrarytheater.info.

ELT is not associated with either the Actors' Equity Association or the Dramatists Guild of America.
