= Turkey Lurkey Time =

Song composed by Burt Bacharach

Song

from the album Promises, Promises
- Released: 1968
- Genre: show tune
- Composer: Burt Bacharach
- Lyricist: Hal David

"Turkey Lurkey Time" is a song-and-dance number from Act 1 of Promises, Promises, the Burt Bacharach/Hal David musical, with a book by Neil Simon. It was originally choreographed for the 1968 Broadway production by Michael Bennett. The dance takes place as part of an office Christmas party scene.

== The dance ==
As conceived by Bennett "with stunning energy and inventiveness", "Turkey Lurkey Time" is a dance performed by three secretaries at an office Christmas party. Their infectious singing and gyrations build into a frenetic chorus dance, as the office staff copy the trio, climaxing with some atop the office desks. According to Neil Simon, "we were having some problems at the end of the first act ... the number [Bennett] came up with didn't just solve the problem, it was a sensation."

Some of the dancers later claimed they had needed regular trips to the chiropractor, so severe was the strain of Bennett's relentless head-bopping choreography. The secretaries of the original cast were Margo Sappington, Baayork Lee and Donna McKechnie.

The number was televised at the 1969 Tony Awards and also performed in the 2003 movie Camp. In November 2012 a cover version of the song, in a mash-up with "Let's Have a Kiki", was featured on the Fox TV series Glee, performed by Sarah Jessica Parker, Chris Colfer, and Lea Michele in the "Thanksgiving" episode.
