= Promises, Promises (2010 Broadway revival cast recording) =

Promises, Promises – The New Broadway Cast Recording

Cast recording by the new Broadway cast
- Released: June 22, 2010
- Label: Masterworks Broadway

Promises, Promises, subtitled The New Broadway Cast Recording, is an album containing a recording of the musical Promises, Promises made by its 2010 Broadway revival cast. The album was released by Masterworks Broadway on June 22, 2010.

== Background ==
The first Broadway revival of Burt Bacharach and Hal David's musical Promises, Promises began previews at the Broadway Theatre on March 27, 2010, before the official opening on April 25. The production starred Sean Hayes as Chuck Baxter and Kristin Chenoweth as Fran Kubelik. The score was supplemented by two famous Bacharach and David hits – "I Say a Little Prayer" and "A House Is Not a Home".

The album was produced by David Caddick and David Lai. Burt Bacharach was quoted to say: "Hearing this score 40 years later, I modestly must say, I like it and I love the way it comes to life on this record. Solidly produced, solidly performed."

== Critical reception ==
Professional ratings
Review scores
Source	Rating
AllMusic	3.5/5 stars

In his review on AllMusic, William Ruhlmann especially notes that "the producers have interpolated a couple of Bacharach/David standards [...] to beef up the score, making it seem more hit-laden than it was the first time around". He also notes that the original score "sounded more like the songwriters' string of ‘60s pop hits than a typical Broadway score" and that the new album sounds "closer to a Broadway-style score" and not "so much like a Dionne Warwick LP with other vocalists." He commends the performers for "do[ing] well", especially Sean Hayes who "can certainly carry a tune" and "navigates the sudden Bacharach key and tempo changes without difficulty."

== Chart performance ==
The album debuted at number 60 on the Billboard 200 for the week of July 10, 2010, dropping to number 190 in its next (and final) week on the chart.

== Track listing ==
CD – Masterworks Broadway 74144

No.	Title	Artist(s)	Length
1.	"Overture"	Broadway Theatre Orchestra
2.	"Half as Big as Life"	Sean Hayes
3.	"Grapes of Roth"	Sean Hayes
4.	"Upstairs"	Sean Hayes
5.	"You'll Think of Someone"	Kristin Chenoweth
6.	"It's Our Little Secret"	Sean Hayes
7.	"I Say a Little Prayer"	Kristin Chenoweth
8.	"She Likes Basketball"	Sean Hayes
9.	"Knowing When to Leave"	Kristin Chenoweth
10.	"Where Can You Take a Girl"	Brooks Ashmanskas
11.	"Wanting Things"	Various
12.	"Turkey Lurkey Time"	Various
13.	"A House Is Not a Home"	Kristin Chenoweth
14.	"A Fact Can Be a Beautiful Thing"	Sean Hayes
15.	"Whoever You Are I Love You"	Kristin Chenoweth
16.	"Christmas Day"	Various
17.	"A House Is Not a Home" (Reprise)	Sean Hayes
18.	"A Young Pretty Girl like You"	Sean Hayes
19.	"I'll Never Fall in Love Again"	Kristin Chenoweth
20.	"Promises, Promises"	Sean Hayes
21.	"I'll Never Fall in Love Again" (Reprise)	Kristin Chenoweth
22.	"I Say a Little Prayer" (Instrumental)	Broadway Theatre Orchestra
23.	"I'll Never Fall in Love Again" (Instrumental)	Broadway Theatre Orchestra
24.	"Promises, Promises" (Instrumental)	Broadway Theatre Orchestra

== Charts ==
Chart (2010)	Peak position
US Billboard 200	60

== Awards ==
Year	Award type	Categories	Results	Ref.
2011	Grammy Awards	Best Musical Show Album	Nominated	
