= Donna McKechnie =

American singer, actress (born 1942)

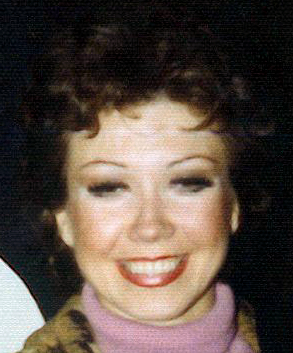
- McKechnie in 1975
- Born: November 16, 1942 (age 83); Pontiac, Michigan, U.S.
- Education: HB Studio
- Occupations: Actress; dancer; singer; choreographer; author
- Years active: 1959-present
- Known for: A Chorus Line; Dark Shadows
- Spouses: Al Schwartz (m. 1966; div. 1970); Michael Bennett (m. 1976; div. 1977)
- Awards: Tony Award for Best Actress in a Musical
- Website: www.donnamckechnie.com

Donna McKechnie (born November 16, 1942) is an American musical theater dancer, singer, actress, and choreographer. She is known for her professional and personal relationship with choreographer Michael Bennett, with whom she collaborated on her most noted role, the character of Cassie Ferguson in the musical A Chorus Line. She earned the Tony Award for Best Actress in a Musical at the 30th Tony Awards for this performance in 1976. She is also known for playing Amanda Harris/Olivia Corey on the gothic soap opera Dark Shadows from 1969 to 1970.

== Early life ==
Donna McKechnie was born in 1942 in Pontiac, Michigan, the daughter of Donald Bruce McKechnie and Carolyn Ruth Johnson. She began ballet classes at age five. Her earliest influence was the classic British ballet film The Red Shoes (1948), which prompted her, at age eight, to plan a career as a ballerina. She studied for many years at the Rose Marie Floyd School of Dance in Royal Oak. Despite her parents' strong misgivings, she moved to New York City when she was 17. Rejected after an audition for the American Ballet Theatre, she found employment in the corps de ballet at Radio City Music Hall but walked off the job on the day of dress rehearsal to do summer stock at the Carousel Theater in Framingham, Massachusetts. She studied theatre at HB Studio in New York City.

After doing a Welch's grape juice commercial and the first L'eggs stockings commercial, McKechnie was cast in a touring company of West Side Story. In 1961, she made her Broadway debut in How to Succeed in Business Without Really Trying, where she met choreographer Bob Fosse and his wife, Gwen Verdon. A stint in a Philadelphia production of A Funny Thing Happened on the Way to the Forum (as Philia) was followed by the NBC music series Hullabaloo, on which she was a featured dancer. While working on Hullabaloo, she met Michael Bennett, who became her husband and a guiding force in her life and career. She also appeared as Philia in the national tour of Forum, starring Jerry Lester (Pseudolus), with Paul Hartman (Senex), Erik Rhodes (Marcus Lycus), Arnold Stang (Hysterium) and Edward Everett Horton (Erronius), produced by Martin Tahse.

== Early Broadway career ==
In April 1968, McKechnie was back on Broadway in the short-lived musical version of Leo Rosten's collection of short stories The Education of H*Y*M*A*N K*A*P*L*A*N, which led to a featured role in Burt Bacharach and Hal David's Promises, Promises, choreographed by Bennett. Along with Baayork Lee and Margo Sappington, she danced in one of Broadway's most famous numbers, "Turkey Lurkey Time", which was when she first began to attract notice from critics and theatergoers alike. This was followed by a role in the touring company of Call Me Madam, starring Ethel Merman.

Bennett showcased McKechnie again in Stephen Sondheim's Company (1970), where she danced "Tick-Tock." After leaving the Broadway cast, she reprised her role in the Los Angeles and London companies, and also toured in the 1971 revival of On the Town as Ivy. In March 1973, she choreographed and performed in the highly acclaimed one-night-only concert Sondheim: A Musical Tribute at the Shubert Theatre in New York. Later that year, McKechnie starred in a production of Irma La Duce at the Wayside Theatre in Middletown, Virginia. In 1974, she co-starred with Richard Kiley and Bob Fosse in the unsuccessful musical film version of the classic The Little Prince.

McKechnie was part of Bennett's group therapy-style workshops that evolved into the Broadway smash A Chorus Line, in which she portrayed Cassie Ferguson, a character based in large part on herself. She danced her third famous Bennett-McKechnie number, "The Music and the Mirror", in which the vocal sections were tailored to her unusually wide range. Initially, McKechnie was to perform the number with four of her male co-stars; however, four previews before opening, McKechnie voiced concern about dancing around the four men, and at the last moment, Bennett changed the direction to have McKechnie perform the song-dance number alone. Her performance earned her the Tony Award for Best Actress in a Musical at the 30th Tony Awards. The role of Maggie Winslow was also based on her life. She married Bennett in 1976, but after only a few months they separated and eventually divorced, although they remained good friends until his death from AIDS in 1987.

In 1980, McKechnie was diagnosed with arthritis and told she never would dance again. She went on to choreograph the NFL's Football's Fabulous Females, The Los Angeles Raiderettes in 1983 as they made their debut in L.A. The same year, in season 2 of the TV show Family Ties, she played Cynthia Bailey, a divorcee who planned to move west with her young son Keith (David Faustino) away from his father Richard (James Sutorius). McKechnie pursued various physical, psychological, and holistic healing remedies, and was well enough to return to the Broadway company of A Chorus Line in 1986. Later in the 1980s, she toured in Sweet Charity and Annie Get Your Gun, and she appeared in a London revival of Can-Can. She also participated in the Chorus Line extravaganza to celebrate its then record-breaking run on Broadway in September 1983.

== Later career ==
McKechnie's television work included a regular role on the gothic soap opera Dark Shadows early in her career. She appeared as Amanda Harris/Olivia Corey from 1969 to 1970. After her rise to fame, she made guest appearances on Scarecrow and Mrs. King (whose female lead, Kate Jackson, was also a Dark Shadows alumna), Rowan & Martin's Laugh In, and Cheers as Debra, the ex-wife of Sam Malone (Ted Danson). She played Suzi Laird on several episodes of Fame.

In the early 1990s, McKechnie appeared off-Broadway twice, first in a revue entitled Cut the Ribbons, followed by Annie Warbucks, a less successful sequel to the hit Annie. In 1993, she reunited with most of the original cast of Company for three concert performances. In 1996, she was awarded the Fred Astaire Award for Best Female Dancer for her performance in a Broadway adaptation of Richard Rodgers and Oscar Hammerstein II's film State Fair. In the same year, she was in a production of You Never Know at the Pasadena Playhouse. In February, 1997, she played Phyllis Rogers Stone in a concert performance of Follies at London's Drury Lane Theatre, and the following year took on the role of Sally Durant Plummer in a production of that same show at the Paper Mill Playhouse in New Jersey. McKechnie also starred opposite Carol Lawrence in the Los Angeles and New York production of Joni Fritz's Girl's Room, produced by Dennis Grimaldi and directed and choreographed by Lynne Taylor-Corbett, both former Michael Bennett dancers.

In 2001, McKechnie created the role of Lela Rogers, mother of Ginger Rogers, in the world premiere of Ginger: The Musical. In 2002, McKechnie starred in the pre-Broadway production of the Jerry Herman musical revue Showtune. In recent years, she has toured periodically in her one-woman show Inside the Music, a potpourri of songs, dances and anecdotes about her life in the theater and her successful battle with arthritis, directed by her old Chorus Line castmate, Thommie Walsh.

McKechnie's autobiography, Time Steps: My Musical Comedy Life, written with Greg Lawrence, was published by Simon & Schuster on August 29, 2006, only weeks before the Broadway revival of A Chorus Line opened on October 5. In June 2010, McKechnie appeared at the Adelaide Cabaret Festival. McKechnie was on the faculty of HB Studio in New York City. In 2015, she served as the standby for Chita Rivera in Kander and Ebb's musical The Visit on Broadway, but never went on.

In the fall of 2017, McKechnie appeared as Mabel in The Pajama Game produced by Arena Stage in Washington, D.C. On March 5, 2024, McKechnie joined the Broadway cast of Wicked, playing Madame Morrible. She departed the production in March 2025.

== Stage credits ==
Year	Play	Role	Theatre	Notes
1961–1963	How to Succeed in Business Without Really Trying	Dancer	46th Street Theatre, Broadway	
1963–1964	A Funny Thing Happened on the Way to the Forum	Philia	National Tour	
1968	The Education of H*Y*M*A*N K*A*P*L*A*N	Kathy McKenna	Alvin Theatre, Broadway	
1968	Call Me Madam	Princess Maria	The Muny, Regional	
1968–1970	Promises, Promises	Vivien Della Hoya	Shubert Theatre, Broadway; Prince of Wales Theatre, London	
1970–1971	Company	Kathy	Alvin Theatre, Broadway; National Tour	
1971–1972	On the Town	Ivy Smith	Imperial Theatre, Broadway	
1972	Company	Kathy	Her Majesty's Theatre, London	
1974	The Threepenny Opera	Lucy Brown	Williamstown Theatre Festival, Regional	
1975–1976	A Chorus Line	Cassie Ferguson	The Public Theater, Off-Broadway; Shubert Theatre, Broadway; National Tour; Theatre Royal, Drury Lane, London	
1979	Wine Untouched	Lillian	Harold Clurman Theater, Off-Broadway	
1983	Wonderful Town	Ruth Sherwood	Long Beach Civic Light Opera, Regional	
1986	The Diary of Adam and Eve; Joseph and the Amazing Technicolor Dreamcoat	Eve; The Narrator	The Muny, Regional	
1986–1987	A Chorus Line	Cassie Ferguson	National Tour; Shubert Theatre, Broadway	Replacement
1987	Sweet Charity	Charity Hope Valentine	National Tour	
1988–1989	Can-Can	Mme. Pistache	Strand Theatre, London	
1991	You Never Know	Mme. Baltin	Pasadena Playhouse, Regional	
1992	Cut the Ribbons	Performer	Westside Theatre, Off-Broadway	
1993–1994	Annie Warbucks	Mrs. Sheila Kelly	Variety Arts Theatre, Off-Broadway	
1994	Fiorello!	Mitzi Travers	New York City Center, Encores!	
1996	State Fair	Emily Arden	National Tour; Music Box Theatre, Broadway	
1997	The Goodbye Girl	Paula McFadden	Walnut Street Theatre, Regional	
1998	Follies	Sally Durant Plummer	Paper Mill Playhouse, Regional	
1999	Babes in Arms	Mazie LaMar	New York City Center, Encores!	
2000	A Little Night Music	Desiree Armfeldt	North Shore Music Theatre & Cincinnati Playhouse in the Park, Regional	
2004	Mack and Mabel	Lottie Ames	Goodspeed Opera House, Regional	
2005	Follies	Carlotta Campion	Barrington Stage Company, Regional	
2011	Love, Loss, and What I Wore	Performer	Westside Theatre, Off-Broadway	Replacement
2011	Ten Cents a Dance	Miss Jones Five	Williamstown Theatre Festival, Regional	
2015	The Visit	Claire Zachanassian	Lyceum Theatre, Broadway	Standby
2015	In Your Arms	Dancer	Old Globe Theatre, Regional	
2017	The Wild Party	Dolores Montoya	The Other Palace, London	
2017	The Pajama Game	Mabel	Arena Stage, Regional	
2018	Half Time	Joanne	Paper Mill Playhouse, Regional	
2024-2025	Wicked	Madame Morrible	Gershwin Theatre, Broadway	

== Awards and nominations ==
Year	Award	Work	Result
1976	Tony Award for Best Actress in a Musical	A Chorus Line	Won
1976	Drama Desk Award for Outstanding Actress in a Musical	A Chorus Line	Won
1976	Theatre World Award (Special Award)	A Chorus Line	Won
1996	Drama Desk Award for Outstanding Featured Actress in a Musical	State Fair	Nominated
