= Glee: The Music, Season 4, Volume 1 =

Album

- From left to right: Mike, Tina, Puck, Brittany, Sam, Mercedes, Marley, Jake, Sue, Artie, Will, Blaine, Kitty, Kurt, Santana, Finn, Rachel, and Brody

Soundtrack album by Glee Cast
- Released: November 27, 2012
- Genre: Pop
- Length: 49:18; 71:51 (Japanese edition); 58:33 (iTunes store version)
- Label: Columbia / 20th Century Fox TV

Glee Cast chronology
Glee: The Music Presents Glease (2012)	Glee: The Music, Season 4, Volume 1 (2012)	Glee: The Music, The Christmas Album Volume 3 (2012)

Glee: The Music, Season 4, Volume 1 is the thirteenth soundtrack album by the cast of the American musical television series Glee. It features 13 songs from the fourth season. It was released on November 27, 2012, through Columbia Records.

== Background ==
The first soundtrack release for the show's fourth season, Glee: The Music, Season 4, Volume 1 features songs from the season premiere, "The New Rachel", through to the eighth episode, "Thanksgiving" (on the standard edition), or the ninth, "Swan Song" (on the deluxe edition). The deluxe edition, only released digitally, features vocals from recurring guest stars Kate Hudson and Sarah Jessica Parker. Although the album is titled "Volume 1", a second volume for Season 4 was never released.

== Track listing ==
No.	Title	Original artist	Length
1.	"It's Time"	Imagine Dragons	3:46
2.	"New York State of Mind"	Billy Joel	3:43
3.	"Give Your Heart a Break"	Demi Lovato	3:31
4.	"Mine"	Taylor Swift	4:12
5.	"The Scientist"	Coldplay	4:14
6.	"Everybody Talks"	Neon Trees	2:59
7.	"Dark Side"	Kelly Clarkson	3:26
8.	"Holding Out for a Hero"	Bonnie Tyler	4:11
9.	"Heroes"	David Bowie	3:44
10.	"Some Nights"	Fun.	4:23
11.	"Homeward Bound / Home"	Simon & Garfunkel / Phillip Phillips	4:12
12.	"Live While We're Young"	One Direction	3:18
13.	"Gangnam Style"	Psy	3:39
Total length:			49:18

Japanese bonus tracks
No.	Title	Original artist(s)	Length
14.	"Don't Speak"	No Doubt	4:20
15.	"Teenage Dream" (Acoustic Version)	Katy Perry	3:45
16.	"Being Good Isn't Good Enough"	Barbra Streisand	3:08
17.	"Let Me Love You (Until You Learn to Love Yourself)"	Ne-Yo	3:40
18.	"Torn"	Ednaswap	3:55
19.	"Girl on Fire"	Alicia Keys	3:45
Total length:			71:41

iTunes Store version
No.	Title	Original artist(s)	Length
2.	"Americano / Dance Again"	Lady Gaga / Jennifer Lopez	3:33
3.	"New York State of Mind"	Billy Joel	3:43
4.	"Give Your Heart a Break"	Demi Lovato	3:31
5.	"Mine"	Taylor Swift	4:12
6.	"The Scientist"	Coldplay	4:14
7.	"Everybody Talks"	Neon Trees	2:59
8.	"Dark Side"	Kelly Clarkson	3:26
9.	"Holding Out for a Hero"	Bonnie Tyler	4:11
10.	"Heroes"	David Bowie	3:44
11.	"Some Nights"	Fun.	4:23
12.	"Homeward Bound / Home"	Simon & Garfunkel / Phillip Phillips	4:12
13.	"Let's Have a Kiki"	Scissor Sisters	2:57
14.	"Live While We're Young"	One Direction	3:18
15.	"Gangnam Style"	Psy	3:39
16.	"Somethin' Stupid"	Frank Sinatra and Nancy Sinatra	2:45
Total length:			58:33

== Personnel ==
- Dianna Agron – vocals
- Cheche Alara – composer
- Josh Alexander – composer
- Adam Anders – arranger, engineer, producer, soundtrack producer, vocals
- Jack Antonoff – composer
- Jacob Artist – vocals
- Peer Åström – engineer, mixing, producer
- Melissa Benoist – vocals
- Guy Berryman – composer
- Jeff Bhasker – composer
- Paul Blair – composer
- David Bowie – composer
- Jonny Buckland – composer
- busbee – composer
- Geoff Bywater – executive in charge of music
- C. Carson Parks – composer
- Will Champion – composer
- Chris Colfer – vocals
- Darren Criss – vocals
- Dante Di Loreto – executive producer
- Andrew Dost – composer
- Brian Eno – composer
- Tommy Denander – Guitar
- Brad Falchuk – executive producer
- Carl Falk – composer
- Fernando Garibay – composer
- Alexander Geringas – composer
- Stefani Germanotta – composer
- Dean Geyer – vocals
- Tyler Glenn – composer
- Yoo Gun-hyung – composer
- Bilal Hajji – composer
- Topper Headon – composer
- Greg Holden – composer
- Scott Hoffman – composer
- Kate Hudson – vocals
- Enrique Iglesias – composer
- Park Jae-sang – composer
- Billy Joel – composer
- Mick Jones – composer
- AJ Junior – composer
- Savan Kotecha – composer
- Samuel Larsen – vocals
- Brian Lee – composer
- Ana Lynch – composer
- Chris Martin – composer
- Kevin McHale – vocals
- Ben McKee – composer
- Jayma Mays – vocals
- Lea Michele – vocals
- Cory Monteith – vocals
- Heather Morris – vocals
- Matthew Morrison – vocals
- Ryan Murphy – producer, soundtrack producer
- Alex Newell – vocals
- Chord Overstreet – vocals
- Tim Pagnotta – composer
- Sarah Jessica Parker – vocals
- Drew Pearson – composer
- Ryan Peterson – engineer
- Dean Pitchford – composer
- Pitbull – composer
- Daniel Platzman – composer
- RedOne – composer
- Dan Reynolds – composer
- Naya Rivera – vocals
- Nate Ruess – composer
- Jason Sellards – composer
- Wayne "Wing" Sermon – composer
- Harry Shum Jr. – vocals
- Paul Simon – composer
- Paul Simonon – composer
- Billy Steinberg – composer
- Jim Steinman – composer
- Joe Strummer – composer
- Taylor Swift – composer
- Becca Tobin – vocals
- Jenna Ushkowitz – vocals
- Rami Yacoub – composer

== Charts ==
=== Weekly charts ===
Chart (2012–2013)	Peak position
Australian Albums (ARIA)	46
Irish Albums (IRMA)	43
Scottish Albums (Official Charts)	50
UK Albums (Official Charts)	42
US Billboard 200	33
US Soundtrack Albums (Billboard)	2

=== Year-end charts ===
Chart (2013)	Position
US Soundtrack Albums (Billboard)	21
