= National Asian Artists Project =

Nonprofit for the work of artists of Asian descent

National Asian Artists Project, Inc. (NAAP) is non-profit 501 (c)(3) company who seeks to showcase the work of artists of Asian descent, primarily in the American theater. It was founded in 2004 by Baayork Lee, Steven Eng, and Nina Zoie Lam.

== Work ==
NAAP employs a multi-faceted approach to serving the community:

- Educational programming, presenting educational opportunities to children at P.S. 124 in New York's Chinatown, via the P.S. 124 Theatre Club which has included participation in iTheatrics Junior Theatre Festival.
- Original productions—the Discover: New Musicals series presents new works by emerging artists with companies of actors of Asian descent.
- Revivals of classic musicals, the Rediscover series has included productions of Oklahoma, Carousel, Hello Dolly! (Directed by Lee Roy Reams), and Oliver!
- The NAAP Broadway Community Chorus provides performance opportunities for established and emerging professional artists, as well as for those with a passion for musical theatre. The chorus performs music from across the Broadway repertoire and beyond, with engagements, and has performed at the Kennedy Center in Washington, D.C. The chorus provides opportunities to collaborate with top Broadway artists, as well as offering vocal, dance and theatre masterclasses to its members.

== NAAP in the News ==
On April 25, 2017, the Tony Awards Administration Committee announced that Lee will be honored for her longstanding commitment to future generations of artists through her work with the National Asian Artists Project and theatre education programs around the world, as the recipient of the 2017 Isabelle Stevenson Tony Award.

== Theatrical Productions ==
- Oklahoma: October 25, 2010 at the Acorn Theatre
- Carousel in Concert: June 4, 2012 at The Peter Jay Sharp Theater
- Hello Dolly!: April 29, 2013 at The Pershing Square Signature Center
- Oliver!: June 5–7, 2014 at The Romulus Linney Courtyard Theater inside The Pershing Square Signature Center
- 5th Anniversary Gala: October 5, 2015 at the Skirball Center for the Performing Arts—included musical numbers from Broadway shows, highlights from past NAAP productions and current material, as well as what Ms. Lee hopes to stage in the future. With a cast of over one hundred supervised by Ms. Lee and director Richard Jay-Alexander, the evening featured seasoned Broadway professionals—friends and supporters of NAAP—staging many of the numbers.
