= Live While We're Young =

Single by One Direction

from the album Take Me Home
- Released: 28 September 2012
- Recorded: 2012
- Studio: Kinglet Studios (Stockholm, Sweden)
- Genre: Bubblegum pop; power pop
- Length: 3:20
- Label: Syco; Sony Music
- Songwriters: Savan Kotecha; Rami Yacoub; Carl Falk
- Producers: Rami Yacoub; Carl Falk

One Direction singles chronology
| "More than This" (2012) | "Live While We're Young" (2012) | "Little Things" (2012) |

Music video
- "Live While We're Young" on YouTube

One Direction EP chronology
| What Makes You Beautiful EP (2011) | Live While We’re Young EP (2012) | Perfect EP (2015) |

"Live While We're Young" is a song by English-Irish boy band One Direction, released as the lead single from their second studio album, Take Me Home (2012). Written by Savan Kotecha and its producers, Rami Yacoub and Carl Falk, the song was released by Syco Records on 28 September 2012. Falk, Kotecha, and Yacoub had collaboratively helmed One Direction's previous hits, "What Makes You Beautiful" and "One Thing". The track is an uptempo, upbeat bubblegum pop song which features rock undertones, vocal harmonies, hand claps, prominent electric guitar riffs, and repetitive synthesizers. The chorus of the song is predominantly featured alongside the bridge and is backed by wordless chants. Its opening guitar riff bears similarities with the Clash's 1982 single, "Should I Stay or Should I Go".

The track received mostly positive reviews from critics, who centred on its omnipresence and jubilant nature. The only negative feedback the song got was centered on the lyrics, which were interpreted as a thinly veiled euphemism for sexual intercourse. A commercial success, the song became a top ten hit in fifteen countries, while reaching the top of the charts in New Zealand and Ireland. In the United States, "Live While We're Young" debuted at number three on the Billboard Hot 100 chart, marking the second-highest bow among all UK acts, outpaced only by Elton John's number one arrival with "Candle in the Wind 1997".

Following an unauthorized internet leak, the accompanying music video was officially released on 20 September 2012, four days earlier than the intended release date. Directed by Vaughan Arnell, the clip, which has a camping festival theme, was generally well received by critics, who commended its carefree nature. Upon release, it broke the Vevo record for having the most views in a 24-hour period with 8.24 million, besting the previous record which had been set by Justin Bieber's "Boyfriend" (8.00 million). Bieber subsequently regained the record with his music video for "Beauty and a Beat" (10.6 million). One Direction performed "Live While We're Young" on televised programs and during their two major concert tours: Take Me Home Tour (2013) and Where We Are Tour (2014). The track was featured in a Pepsi television commercial for the United States and was performed on an episode of Glee. This song is the first track on Now 45.

== Background and release ==
"Live While We're Young" was written by Rami Yacoub, Carl Falk, and Savan Kotecha, and was produced by Yacoub and Falk. The trio had collaboratively helmed One Direction's previous hits, "What Makes You Beautiful" and "One Thing". In early 2012, the group confirmed a follow-up release for their debut album, Up All Night (2011), was in development. "In the summer, we’re going to get back and start a new record. We want to bring out a record nearly every year, every year and a half," member Niall Horan said, revealing they were arranging "meetings and stuff with different writers and producers." The band began recording the album in May 2012, in Stockholm, Sweden, at Kinglet Studios—"Live While We're Young" is a result of those recording sessions. In June 2012, Horan spoke to MTV News, elaborating that the lead single would probably be released in September 2012.

The band confirmed the single by uploading a video to YouTube on 23 August 2012. Globally, the song was made available for pre-order at 24:00 GMT on 24 August, through the iTunes Store, while excluding, Canada, Japan, and the United States. The artwork was revealed on 14 September. Jocelyn Vena of MTV News described it as portraying "the fivesome enjoying the outdoors during a camping trip, goofing off outside a tent." On 28 September, Sony Music Entertainment released it digitally in Australia, New Zealand, and most of Europe. It impacted the United Kingdom on 30 September, while in the United States it was released on 1 October. Due to a processing error, the US iTunes Store was selling the track for 99 cents – instead of the general $1.29. Label sources indicated the initial price was a mistake, but could not be corrected until midday 1 October. By the afternoon, the price had changed from 99 cents to $1.29.

== Composition and lyrics ==
"Live While We're Young" is an uptempo, upbeat bubblegum pop song which features rock undertones, vocal harmonies, hand claps, prominent electric guitar riffs, and repetitive synthesizers, reminiscent of the musical structures of their debut album. The opening guitar riff has been noted as similar to that of the Clash song "Should I Stay or Should I Go" (1982). According to Alexis Petridis of The Guardian, the guitar is played thrice between the riff with the plectrum stroking the strings, while it is pressed. One note in the chord is changed, which Petridis surmised was probably to avoid paying any royalty to the Clash. Sam Lansky of Idolator noted that the song is musically similar to their breakthrough hit "What Makes You Beautiful". In contrast to One Direction's previous singles, the lead vocals are predominantly sung by Zayn Malik.

According to the digital sheet music published at Musicnotes.com by Sony/ATV Music Publishing, One Direction's vocal range in the song span from the note of D_{4} to A_{5}. Written in the key of D major, the song is set in common time with a fast-paced tempo of 126 beats per minute. The song follows a basic sequence of D–G–D–G–D–A as its chord progression. The chorus of the song is predominantly featured alongside the bridge, is backed by wordless chants, and encompasses the lines: "Let’s go crazy, crazy, crazy till we see the sun/ I know we only met but let’s pretend it’s love / And never, never, never stop for anyone/ Tonight let’s get some, and live while we’re young." Several critics commonly concurred that the song's lyrics interpret a thinly veiled euphemism for sexual intercourse. Kotecha quipped in a September 2012 interview with Sugarscape:

"The whole idea is that you have that nostalgic night out, so people who are older can listen to it too. None of us are naive enough not to know what kids do. It’s important not to patronise the youth of today, we’re not gonna be writing about 'oh let’s just hold hands for a while' you know? They need their music to connect. A lot of songs are about sex and you have to be realistic about it."

== Critical response ==
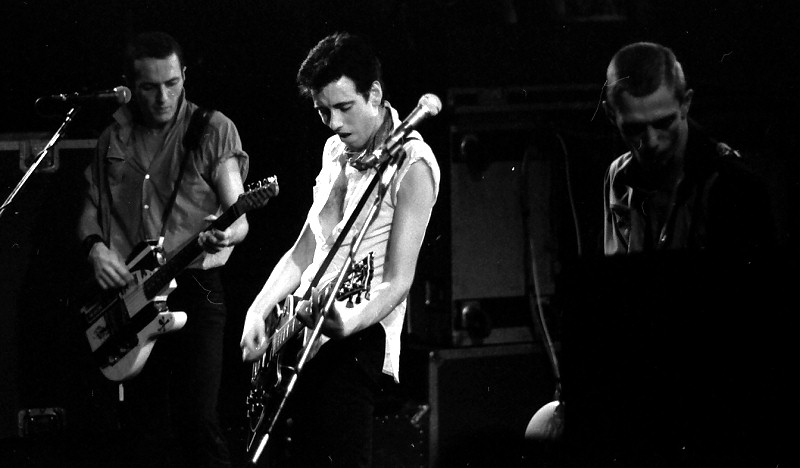
The song's opening guitar riff was compared by some critics to that of the Clash's (pictured) 1982 single "Should I Stay or Should I Go".

Robert Copsey of Digital Spy gave "Live While We're Young" four out of five stars and wrote, "it's little different from what we've heard before – but when you're the world's biggest boyband, it's no bad thing." Mikael Wood of the Los Angeles Times summarised it as a "characteristically peppy piece of high-gloss party pop." Lansky praised its effectiveness and thought it was "perfectly tailored to top the charts." Andrew Unterberger of Popdust acknowledged that "the song is smart to swipe the guitar-only opening pattern from The Clash's "Should I Stay or Should I Go?"—akin to "What Makes You Beautiful" lifting the "Summer Nights" beginning—calling on pop history to get you excited for the song before you even really realise why." Unterberger further highlighted the small lyrical plays for conveying "an incredible amount of urgency and fun without much clunky verbage [sic], making singing along something of an inevitability." A writer for The Huffington Post asserted that the song delivers for fans of their debut album: "a poppy, energetic, happy-go-lucky track."

Sylvie Lesas of Evigshed Magazine gave it a rating of five out of five stars, called it "upbeat, fun and very fresh", and proclaimed that "radios are going to love it." Chris Younie of 4Music called it "insanely catchy", lauding its production for combining a "simple" guitar riff with an "anthemic feel-good chorus". Alexandra Capotorto of PopCrush rated it four stars out of five, deeming it memorable and "irresistible" for any demographic. Vena opined that the "bit cheeky" song perfectly embodies a "joie de vivre message." MSN Music's Tina Hart concluded, "It's fun, pure unadulterated pop and I like it." Writing for The Vancouver Sun, Leah Collins quipped that even though the song lifts its main riff from a Clash song, "this tune is as yummy and bubble-gummy as anything" on One Direction's debut studio album Up All Night (2011). Newsday's Glenn Gamboa acknowledged that the song is even more omnipresent than the band's previous hits combined.

In a detailed review, HitFix's Melina Newman denounced its lyrical content: "Even though they never are so blatant about it that booty call subtext can't go right over their tween audience's head, there's no mistaking lines like "if we get together, don’t let the pictures ever leave your phone" for anyone who's 13 or up. The lyrics are unwieldy and uncouth. That's what happens when you're not a boy, but not yet a man: One Direction can't go straight from the G-rated sweetness of "What Makes You Beautiful" to something akin to Enrique Iglesias's "Tonight, I’m F****** You," so instead they’re stuck with this in between clumsiness that the not-so-little girls will understand." Grady Smith of Entertainment Weekly characterised it as "not-so-innocent" and a "party jam". Jason Lipshutz of Billboard felt that its sexual suggestive lyricism "arrives too soon after the more accomplished puppy-love odes of previous hits "What Makes You Beautiful" and "One Thing" to further the conversation."

== Commercial performance ==
"Live While We're Young" debuted on the Irish Singles Chart at number one on 4 October 2012, becoming One Direction's fourth top ten appearance and their second chart-topper in Ireland. In the United Kingdom, the single became One Direction's fourth UK Singles Chart top ten hit in twelve months, entering at number three on 7 October 2012. Elsewhere in Europe, the song became a top ten hit in Austria, Belgium (Flanders), Czech Republic, Denmark, Hungary, Italy, the Netherlands, Spain, and Switzerland. It was certified gold by the Federation of the Italian Music Industry (FIMI). Additionally, it attained top forty positions in European territories such as Belgium (Wallonia), France, Germany, Sweden, and Slovakia. The single debuted at number two on the Australian Singles Chart dated 14 October 2012, with first-week sales of 58,659 copies. The single marks the group's highest peaking song in Australia, passing up the number-three peak of "One Thing", and their third top ten hit. The track was certified double platinum by the Australian Recording Industry Association (ARIA), denoting shipments of 140,000 copies. The track made its New Zealand Singles Chart debut at number one on 8 October 2012, marking the group's first number-one hit, and their second top-five charting song in New Zealand. "Live While We're Young" has received a platinum certification from Recorded Music NZ (RMNZ), indicating sales of 15,000 copies. After three days of digital availability, the song made its Canadian Hot 100 debut at number 78 on 4 October 2012. It surged to its peak position of number two the following week, recording the highest number of digital downloads in the tracking week for a song in Canada.

In the United States, One Direction made US chart history by achieving the biggest opening one-week sales figure for a song by a non-US artist ever; the track entered the Digital Songs chart at number one on 10 October 2012, selling 341,000 copies in its first week. Additionally, it was the first time since January 2012, when Adele's "Set Fire to the Rain" was the top seller that a single by a British act had led that list and its weekly sales is also the highest by a British act since another Adele track "Rolling in the Deep", sold 353,000 units in a week in May 2011. The single's opening sales is also the third biggest debut ever for a download by a group, surpassed by the arrivals of Maroon 5's 2012 single "Payphone" (493,000), and the Black Eyed Peas' 2009 single "Boom Boom Pow" (465,000). "Live While We're Young" debuted at number three on the Billboard Hot 100 chart, marking the highest bow by a British group and the second-highest debut among all UK acts, outpaced only by Elton John's number one arrival in 1997 with "Candle in the Wind 1997". In addition, that tracking week marked the first time two UK artists have simultaneously started in the Billboard Hot 100 top ten, as Adele's "Skyfall" debuted at number eight. Billboard correspondent Keith Caufield noted its "huge sales" spurred its high entry on the Billboard Hot 100, which blends sales, airplay and streaming data. "Live While We're Young" also became the act's highest-peaking single, passing up the number-four peak of "What Makes You Beautiful". In the week ending 20 January 2013, the song topped the one million mark in US sales. Likewise, the song was certified platinum by the Recording Industry Association of America (RIAA) on 23 January 2013, and it has sold 1,248,000 copies in the US as of November 2013.

== Music video ==
The music video for "Live While We're Young" was directed by Vaughan Arnell. On 24 August 2012, One Direction announced that an accompanying music video for "Live While We're Young" was filmed at a "secret place." According to an MTV News article published on 14 September 2012, the video would feature a "summer music festival vibe" with the group "getting wet and wild, acting silly with props and getting soaked by water guns." The official video was initially due to premiere on 24 September 2012. However, a poor-quality version of the music video leaked online on 20 September 2012: the same day it was officially published on One Direction's Vevo channel on YouTube. In regard, the group released a statement: "We wanted our fans to see the video and hear the single in the proper way so we've moved the premiere to tonight. We're really excited about LWWY, we've worked really hard on it and we can't wait for everyone to see and hear it later today!"

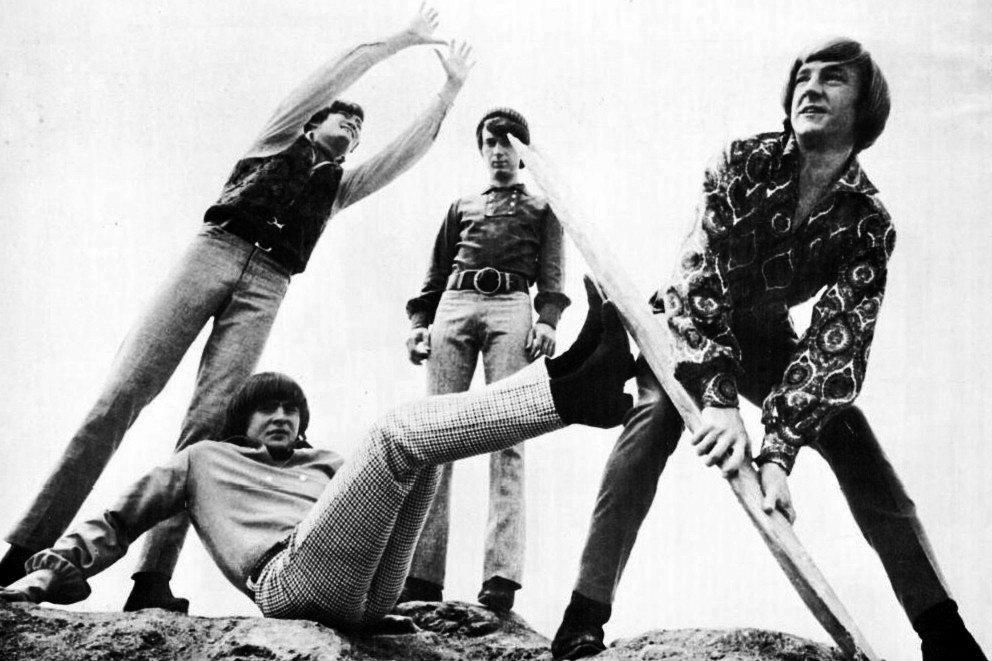
Fuse writer Nicole James opined that the music video contains "Monkees-inspired hijinks" (pictured).

The video begins with One Direction waking up in a tent. Outside, Payne starts singing the opening lines, as others are seen playing guitars and sitting on hay bales in a camp setting. Subsequent scenes intercut featuring One Direction performing the song at the camp setting in a circle, on an open field, driving a car, and at a lake where members of the group play in plastic bubbles and boats. As it turns to nighttime, the camp is the main setting; they conduct a football match and afterwards a pool party. The video ends with One Direction looking at the camera, with Malik singing the last line. Throughout the video, teenage boys and girls are shown with the band.

Upon release, the video broke the Vevo record for having the most views in a 24-hour period with 8.24 million views, besting the previous record which had been set by Justin Bieber's "Boyfriend" (8.00 million). Bieber regained the record with the release of the music video for "Beauty and a Beat" (10.6 million) on 12 October 2012. It received positive reviews from music critics, who generally complimented its carefree, jubilant nature. Smith quipped that it has "notable moments," which he cited, "glowstick campfire dances, inflatable pool splashing, four wheeler racing, and an unfortunate blonde streak in Zayn [Malik]'s hair." The Hollywood Reporter writer Sophie A. Schillaci called it "fun-filled", and concluded that the video perfectly accompanies the track's lyricism. Lansky called the "high quality" clip "fairly standard 1D fare", elaborating: "the boys get up to some teenage shenanigans and, well, live while they’re young. When their festivities culminate in a pool party that reads more like a wet t-shirt contest than anything else, it's abundantly clear that 1D knows their audience." The Huffington Post characterised it as an "epic summer adventure", assessing: "from a camping trip to the ultimate beach party, complete with a shirtless Niall [Horan] and inflatable banana." Collins described it as featuring the group "doing what they do best – scampering, singing, scampering some more." ITN's Lindsay Brown viewed the video as "wholesome", showing them "having some good old fashioned fun." Fuse editor Nicole James praised the apparent recurring trend of "how the group isn't afraid to make fun of themselves." James elaborated: "If it were any other boy band acting out the Monkees-inspired hijinks in 1D's new video "Live While We're Young," it would likely come off as super cheesy. But for these five guys, their sense of comfortable self-awareness really comes through." As of September 2025, the video has over 750 million views.

== Live performances and usage in media ==
One Direction performed the track along with songs of their debut album at the 2012 BBC Radio 1 Teen Awards (7 October). The group performed "Live While We're Young" on The X Factor Italy (1 November) and on the X Factor Sweden (2 November). They also performed "Live While We're Young" and "Little Things" on The X Factor USA (8 November). The group performed "Live While We're Young" and "Little Things" on the BBC's Children in Need 2012 telethon (16 November). One Direction also performed the track at Germany's Bambi Awards (22 November). "Live While We're Young" was included in the set list of the group's headlining sold-out show at Madison Square Garden (3 December). It also was incorporated on the set list of the group's worldwide Take Me Home Tour (2013), utilised as the show's twentieth song.

"Live While We're Young" was featured in a Pepsi television commercial for the United States that featured both One Direction and the American football player Drew Brees. It premiered on Fox in the United States on 10 October 2012. Vena called the clip comedic and assessed: "The brand-new commercial not only allows the group to show off their funny bones, but it also serves as a reminder that their new album Take Me Home, featuring "LWWY," is only a month away from dropping." It was one of the songs covered by the cast of Glee during the 29 November 2012 episode "Thanksgiving". The fictional character Sebastian Smythe, portrayed by Grant Gustin, sang lead vocals while the fictional Dalton Academy Warblers sang back-up. The version was released on the studio album, Glee: The Music, Season 4, Volume 1. The track was also used for the opening scene of the Miss Universe 2012 pageant. An instrumental version of the song is featured in the exergaming video game Fitness Boxing.

== Formats and track listings ==
- Digital download – EP
1. "Live While We're Young" – 3:18
2. "Live While We're Young" (Dave Audé remix) – 5:40
3. "Live While We're Young" (The Jump Smokers remix) – 4:25
4. "I Want" (Live) – 3:06
5. "Moments" (Live) (Pre-order only) – 4:44
- UK and US CD single
1. "Live While We're Young" – 3:18
2. "I Want" (Live) – 3:06

== Credits and personnel ==
- Carl Falk – writing, production, programming, instruments, guitar, background vocals
- Kristoffer Fogelmark – background vocals
- Niall Horan – additional guitar
- Savan Kotecha – writing, background vocals
- Rami Yacoub – writing, production, programming, instruments, bass

Credits adapted from the liner notes of Take Me Home.

== Charts ==
=== Weekly charts ===
Weekly chart performance for "Live While We're Young"
| Chart (2012–13) | Peak position |
|---|---|
| Australia (ARIA) | 2 |
| Austria (Ö3 Austria Top 40) | 8 |
| Belgium (Ultratop 50 Flanders) | 7 |
| Belgium (Ultratop 50 Wallonia) | 19 |
| Brazil (Billboard Hot 100) | 33 |
| Canada Hot 100 (Billboard) | 2 |
| Czech Republic Airplay (ČNS IFPI) | 9 |
| Denmark (Tracklisten) | 4 |
| Euro Digital Song Sales (Billboard) | 4 |
| France (SNEP) | 20 |
| Germany (GfK) | 22 |
| Global Dance Tracks (Billboard) | 26 |
| Hungary (Rádiós Top 40) | 2 |
| Ireland (IRMA) | 1 |
| Italy (FIMI) | 10 |
| Japan Hot 100 (Billboard) | 5 |
| Mexico (Billboard Ingles Airplay) | 5 |
| Netherlands (Dutch Top 40) | 22 |
| Netherlands (Single Top 100) | 3 |
| New Zealand (Recorded Music NZ) | 1 |
| Norway (VG-lista) | 11 |
| Russia Airplay (Tophit) | 101 |
| Scottish Singles Sales (Official Charts) | 2 |
| Slovakia Airplay (ČNS IFPI) | 35 |
| South Korea International Chart (GAON) | 18 |
| Spain (Promusicae) | 4 |
| Sweden (Sverigetopplistan) | 23 |
| Switzerland (Schweizer Hitparade) | 7 |
| UK Singles (Official Charts) | 3 |
| UK Airplay (Music Week) | 4 |
| US Billboard Hot 100 | 3 |
| US Pop Airplay (Billboard) | 16 |
| US Dance Club Songs (Billboard) | 6 |

=== Year-end charts ===
2012 year-end chart performance for "Live While We're Young"
| Chart (2012) | Position |
|---|---|
| Australia (ARIA) | 77 |
| Brazil (Crowley) | 72 |
| France (SNEP) | 168 |
| Hungary (Rádiós Top 40) | 63 |
| Netherlands (Dutch Top 40) | 95 |
| UK Singles (Official Charts Company) | 96 |

2013 year-end chart performance for "Live While We're Young"
| Chart (2013) | Position |
|---|---|
| Japan (Japan Hot 100) | 33 |
| UK Singles (Official Charts Company) | 200 |

== Certifications ==
| Region | Certification | Certified units/sales |
|---|---|---|
| Australia (ARIA) | 3× Platinum | 210,000^{‡} |
| Canada (Music Canada) | 2× Platinum | 160,000^{‡} |
| Italy (FIMI) | Gold | 15,000^{*} |
| Japan (RIAJ) | 2× Platinum | 500,000^{*} |
| Mexico (AMPROFON) | 2× Platinum | 120,000^{‡} |
| New Zealand (RMNZ) | Platinum | 15,000^{*} |
| Sweden (GLF) | Platinum | 40,000^{‡} |
| United Kingdom (BPI) | Platinum | 600,000^{‡} |
| United States (RIAA) | Platinum | 1,383,000 |
Streaming
| Denmark (IFPI Danmark) | Platinum | 1,800,000^{†} |
| Japan (RIAJ) | Gold | 50,000,000^{†} |
^{*} Sales figures based on certification alone.^{‡} Sales+streaming figures based on certification alone.^{†} Streaming-only figures based on certification alone.

== Release history ==
| Region | Date | Format | Label |
|---|---|---|---|
| United States | 25 September 2012 | Mainstream airplay | Columbia |
| Australia | 28 September 2012 | Digital download | Sony Music Entertainment |
| Austria | 28 September 2012 | Digital download | Sony Music Entertainment |
| Belgium | 28 September 2012 | Digital download | Sony Music Entertainment |
| Finland | 28 September 2012 | Digital download | Sony Music Entertainment |
| Germany | 28 September 2012 | Digital download | Sony Music Entertainment |
| Ireland | 28 September 2012 | Digital download | Sony Music Entertainment |
| Italy | 28 September 2012 | Digital download | Sony Music Entertainment |
| Luxembourg | 28 September 2012 | Digital download | Sony Music Entertainment |
| New Zealand | 28 September 2012 | Digital download | Sony Music Entertainment |
| Netherlands | 28 September 2012 | Digital download | Sony Music Entertainment |
| Norway | 28 September 2012 | Digital download | Sony Music Entertainment |
| Sweden | 28 September 2012 | Digital download | Sony Music Entertainment |
| Switzerland | 28 September 2012 | Digital download | Sony Music Entertainment |
| Mexico | 30 September 2012 | Digital download | Sony Music Entertainment |
| United Kingdom | 30 September 2012 | Digital download | Sony Music Entertainment |
| United States | 1 October 2012 | Digital download | Sony Music Entertainment |
| Canada | 1 October 2012 | Digital download | Sony Music Entertainment |
| United Kingdom | 1 October 2012 | CD single | Sony Music Entertainment |
| Spain | 2 October 2012 | Digital download | Sony Music Entertainment |

== See also ==
- One Thing
- Best Song Ever
- Steal My Girl
- What Makes You Beautiful
- Drag Me Down
