= Twigs (play) =

- Original Broadway poster
- Original language: English

Premiere
- Date: 1971
- Place: Broadway

Twigs is a play by George Furth, which premiered on Broadway in 1971.

== Overview ==
The play consists of four sections involving three sisters and their mother, each focusing on one of the women as she confronts various issues with the man in her life. Emily is a recent widow, relocating to a new apartment, who finds herself attracted to the owner of the moving company. Celia is the wife of a bigoted ex-Army sergeant, whose reunion with an old pal leaves her out in the cold. Dorothy and her spouse discreetly try to learn if each has been faithful to the other as they celebrate their 25th wedding anniversary. Last of all is Ma, the stubborn Irish matriarch, who rises from her deathbed to have a priest sanctify her common-law marriage to a Dutchman.

== Production ==
Furth wrote his play intending it to be a tour de force for a single actress playing all four roles. The title is derived from the quote, "Just as the twig is bent, the tree's inclined", written by Alexander Pope in his Moral Essays in 1773.

The play premiered on Broadway at the Broadhurst Theatre on November 14, 1971 (previews from November 9), and transferred to the Plymouth Theatre on January 5, 1972, closing on July 23, 1972, after 289 performances and seven previews. Directed by Michael Bennett, the cast included Sada Thompson, Conrad Bain, and Simon Oakland; Bob Avian was production assistant. Thompson won both the Tony and the Drama Desk Award for her performance.

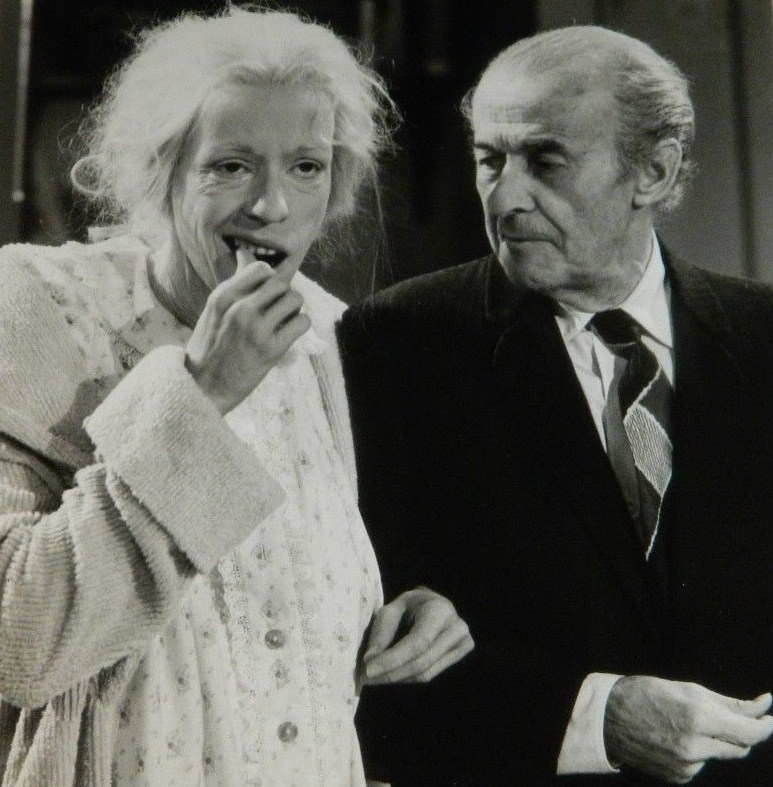
Carol Burnett and Liam Dunn in the TV adaptation, 1975

Stephen Sondheim provided incidental music, including a song for Celia titled "Hollywood and Vine". Sondheim wrote: "George [Furth] asked me to write a song for Celia, who mid-scene is reminiscing about a number she had sung in her movie days."

Some of the plays used in Twigs originally were written for the musical Company.

The Los Angeles Times, in Sada Thompson's obituary, quoted Walter Kerr: she "does not simply give a stunning performance. She gives four of them." According to Furth's obituary in The New York Times, the play received mixed reviews, but Walter Kerr "called its four interconnected pieces 'funny and touching and freshly conceived.' "

== Television film ==
Furth adapted his play for a 1975 television film co-directed by Alan Arkin and Clark Jones. The cast included Carol Burnett, Ed Asner, Liam Dunn, Pat Hingle, Gary Burghoff, and Bain reprising his Broadway role. The film was telecast on CBS on March 6, 1975.

A second telefilm was made in 1982, starring Cloris Leachman. The film was telecast on November 7, 1982 on the Entertainment Channel.
