= Baayork Lee =

American dancer and theatre director (born 1946)

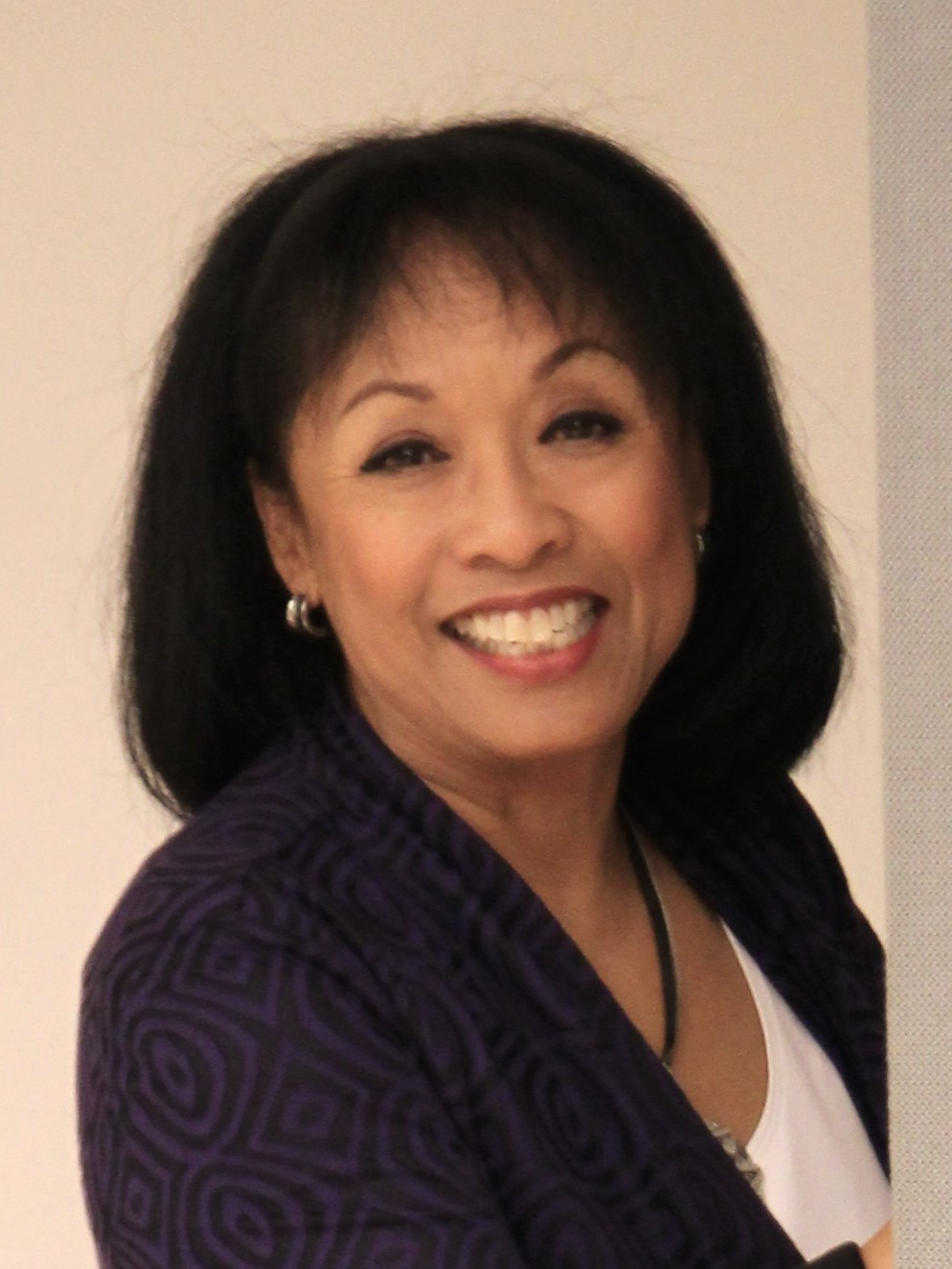
- Lee in 2014
- Born: December 5, 1946 (age 79); New York City
- Occupations: Actress, singer, dancer, choreographer, theatre director, author
- Years active: 1951–present
- Awards: 2003 Lifetime Achievement Asian Woman Warrior Award, 2014 Paul Robeson Citation Award

Baayork Lee (born December 5, 1946) is an American actress, singer, dancer, choreographer, theatre director, and author.

== Early life and career ==
Lee was born in New York City's Chinatown, to an Indian mother and Chinese father. She started dancing at an early age, and she made her Broadway debut at the age of five as Princess Ying Yawolak in the original production of The King and I in 1951. In a 2004 interview, she stated that Yul Brynner, the original king, was like a second father to her. After she outgrew her role in The King and I, she continued to study in ballet, modern, and afro-Cuban dance. She appeared in George Balanchine's original production of The Nutcracker, where she met ballerina Maria Tallchief, whom she idolized.

While attending the High School for Performing Arts, she met fellow student Michael Bennett. Around the same time, she appeared in Flower Drum Song. Although Lee aspired to become a professional ballerina, she was rejected from companies because of her height; she is 4 feet 10 inches (1.47 m) tall. Though she was offered a scholarship to Juilliard, Lee instead pursued her career in theatre. Her Broadway appearances included Mr. President, Golden Boy, and Here's Love.

Her next three shows were all choreographed by Bennett: A Joyful Noise, Henry, Sweet Henry, and Promises, Promises. In the last, she performed the dance number "Turkey Lurkey Time" (with Donna McKechnie and Margo Sappington). Lee was the dance captain for Promises, Promises and recreated the choreography for subsequent touring productions, starting her future path as a choreographer. In 1973, she travelled to Israel to film Norman Jewison's version of Jesus Christ Superstar.

== A Chorus Line and Michael Bennett ==
In 1973, she appeared in Bennett's Seesaw, assisted with choreography, and was featured opposite Tommy Tune.

In 1975, Lee was invited by Bennett to participate in the workshops from which A Chorus Line was developed. The character of Connie Wong was, in large part, based upon her life. Along with the cast, she won the 1976 Theatre World Award for Ensemble Performance for the show. Fifteen years later, along with cast member Thommie Walsh and Robert Viagas, she documented the evolution of A Chorus Line in the book On the Line: The Creation of A Chorus Line, published in 1990.

In the decades following the original Broadway production, she has directed or choreographed many productions of the musical, including the most recent Broadway revival in 2006. The 2008 feature documentary Every Little Step chronicles the casting process of the 2006 revival.

Lee became one of Bennett's closest collaborators, and she helped to develop the choreography in many of his subsequent shows.

== Choreography and directing career ==
Starting in the 1970s, Lee began to focus on choreographing, first with a production of Where's Charley? in New Jersey.

Since then, she has directed national and international tours of The King & I, Carmen Jones, Bombay Dreams, Rodgers and Hammerstein's Cinderella, Porgy and Bess, Jesus Christ Superstar, and Barnum. She was the associate choreographer for Tommy Tune for a time. She has choreographed several productions for the Washington National Opera at the Kennedy Center. She also choreographed the troubled production of Marilyn: An American Fable.

Other projects include becoming a talent scout for Tokyo Disneyland, opening a musical theater school in Seoul, South Korea, and producing various shows. In 2018, she choreographed New York City Center's Gala production of A Chorus Line.

She directed and choreographed South Pacific for City Springs Theatre Company in Sandy Springs, Georgia in 2019.

== Stage ==
Year	Title	Role	Venue	Ref.
1951	The King and I	Princess Yaowlak	Broadway, St. James Theatre	
1958	Flower Drum Song	Dancing ensemble	Broadway, St. James Theatre	
1962	Bravo Giovanni	Dancer	Broadway, Broadhurst Theatre	
1962	Mr. President	Deborah Chakronin, et al.	Broadway, St. James Theatre	
1963	Here's Love	Dancer	Broadway, Shubert Theatre	
1964	Golden Boy	Ensemble	Broadway, Majestic Theatre	
1966	A Joyful Noise	Ensemble dancer	Broadway, Mark Hellinger Theatre	
1967	Henry, Sweet Henry	Norton School student	Broadway, Palace Theatre	
1968	Promises, Promises	Lum Ding hostess, Miss Wong	Broadway, Shubert Theatre	
1973	Seesaw	Citizen of New York	Broadway, Uris Theatre	
1975	A Chorus Line	Connie, dance captain	Broadway, Shubert Theatre	
1983	My One and Only	Associate choreographer	Broadway, St. James Theatre	
1983	Marilyn! the Musical	Choreographer	Broadway, Minskoff Theatre	
2006	A Chorus Line	Re-staging, choreographer	Broadway, Gerald Schoenfeld Theatre	

== Awards and honors ==
In 2017, Lee received the Isabelle Stevenson Tony Award, which honors members of the theater industry for their significant contributions to charitable causes. She was honored for her longstanding commitment to future generations of artists through her work with the National Asian Artists Project (NAAP) and theatre education programs around the world. Lee is a co-founder of NAAP, a non-profit that showcases the work of Asian-American theatre artists through performance, outreach, and educational programming. The Actors’ Equity Foundation gave Lee the Paul Robeson Citation Award in 2014.

Year	Award / Honor	Description	Ref.
1976	Theatre World Award	A Chorus Line	
2003	Women Warrior Honoree	Columbia College Chicago's Center for Asian Arts and Media at their Women Warrior Festival, where she delivered the keynote address.	
2014	Paul Robeson Citation Award	Actors’ Equity Foundation.	
2017	Isabelle Stevenson Award	For contributions to charitable causes through work with the National Asian Artists Project (NAAP) and theatre education programs worldwide.	

== Notes ==
- Flinn, Denny Martin, What They Did for Love: The Untold Story Behind the Making of A Chorus Line, Bantam, 1989, ISBN 0-553-34593-1
- Viagas, Robert, Baayork Lee, Thommie Walsh, On the Line: the Creation of A Chorus Line, Morrow, 1990, ISBN 0-688-08429-X
