= Henry, Sweet Henry =

- Original Recording
- Music: Bob Merrill
- Lyrics: Bob Merrill
- Book: Nunnally Johnson
- Basis: Novel and film The World of Henry Orient
- Productions: 1967 Broadway

Henry, Sweet Henry is a musical with a book by Nunnally Johnson and music and lyrics by Bob Merrill.

Based on the 1964 novel The World of Henry Orient by Johnson's daughter Nora and the subsequent film of the same name, the plot focuses on Valerie and Marian, two wealthy, love-struck teenagers who stalk an avant-garde composer and aging philanderer.

== Productions ==
The musical premiered on Broadway on October 23, 1967 at the Palace Theatre, and closed on December 31, 1967 after 80 performances and twelve previews. It was directed by George Roy Hill and choreographed by Michael Bennett. The cast featured Don Ameche, Neva Small, Robin Wilson, Carol Bruce, Louise Lasser, Baayork Lee, Priscilla Lopez, Alice Playten, and Pia Zadora.

The stage musical was never filmed. However, during its Broadway run, Alice Playten and the chorus performed one song from the score – "Poor Little Person" — on The Ed Sullivan Show.

The show is one of those written about by William Goldman in his 1968 book The Season, which describes the ins and outs of a season on Broadway. He contends that Henry, Sweet Henry was well received by audience members (getting "every bit as good a reaction as Mame gets", referring to a smash hit of the time) but couldn't survive a bad review from Clive Barnes in the New York Times, who was then on a crusade to bring pop music into Broadway scores. Goldman also describes how the show was intended as a vehicle to propel its young lead Robin Wilson to stardom, but instead accidentally allowed second lead Alice Playten to steal the show.

An Off Off Broadway revival of the musical, directed and produced by James Rocco and choreographed by Rebecca Urich was in the midst of rehearsals when the theatre it was playing at, the Mercer Arts Center, collapsed to the ground. Rocco, 16 at the time, was given a challenge by the Lambs Club; if he could reorganize the show they would let the company use their theatre on 45 Street. The youngsters rose to the challenge and the show went on to play its limited engagement with a few added performances. It starred Rebecca Urich in the role of Val, which she had understudied in the original production.

The York Theatre Company "Musicals in Mufti", New York, presented a staged concert of the musical in October 2004.

== Song list ==
Act I

- "Academic Fugue"
- "In Some Little World"
- "Pillar to Post"
- "Here I Am"
- "Whereas"
- "I Wonder How It Is To Dance With a Boy"
- "Nobody Steps on Kafritz"
- "Henry, Sweet Henry"
- "Woman in Love"
- "The People Watchers"

Act II

- "Weary Near to Dyin'"
- "Poor Little Person"
- "I'm Blue Too"
- "To Be Artistic"
- "Forever"
- "Do You Ever Go To Boston?"
- "Here I Am (Reprise)"

== Awards and nominations ==
Source: Playbill

- Tony Award for Best Featured Actress in a Musical (Playten, nominee)
- Tony Award for Best Choreography (Bennett, nominee)
- Theatre World Award (Playten, winner)
