= Jill O'Hara =

American actress and singer

- Occupations: Actress, singer
- Years active: 1967–present
- Parents: John B. O'Hara (father); Edith O'Hara (mother)

Jill O'Hara is an American actress and singer. She was nominated for the Tony Award for Best Lead Actress in a Musical in 1969 for creating the role of Fran Kubelik in Promises, Promises, a role made famous by Shirley MacLaine in the movie the musical is based on, The Apartment (1960).

== Early life ==
Her father, John B. O'Hara, was a salesman, and her mother, Edith O'Hara (née Hopkins), was a journalist and drama teacher, who founded the 13th Street Repertory Theatre in New York City. Edith ran it until her death in 2020. Her sister is actress Jenny O'Hara, and her singer/guitarist brother Jack O'Hara, grew up amid their mother's pursuit of a theatrical career. Edith O'Hara directed a children's theater in Warren, where the two daughters occasionally acted. Jill studied at the HB Studio in Greenwich Village.

== Career ==
O'Hara created the role of Sheila in the original Off-broadway production of Hair in 1967. In 1971 she performed off-Broadway in Henrik Ibsen's play The Master Builder. She was a member of the original Broadway cast of George M! in 1968.

In addition to her appearances on original cast albums, O'Hara has released albums of her own songs and recordings and has performed her own cabaret shows.
