= Seesaw (musical) =

- Original recording
- Music: Cy Coleman
- Lyrics: Dorothy Fields
- Book: Michael Bennett
- Basis: Two for the Seesaw by William Gibson
- Productions: 1973 Broadway; 2020 Off-Broadway

Seesaw is a 1973 American musical with a book by Michael Bennett, music by Cy Coleman, and lyrics by Dorothy Fields.

Based on the William Gibson play Two for the Seesaw, the plot focuses on a brief affair between Jerry Ryan, a young lawyer from Nebraska, and Gittel Mosca, a kooky, streetwise dancer from the Bronx. The musical numbers evoke colorful aspects of New York City life but have relatively little to do with the story. The most notable feature of the score's original orchestrations by Larry Fallon was their wide use of brass instruments.

== Production history ==
The production faced seemingly insurmountable problems during its pre-Broadway trial, and when it reached Detroit, producers Joseph Kipness and Lawrence Kasha brought in Bennett for advice. He recommended they abandon the book by Michael Stewart and fire director Edwin Sherin and leading lady Lainie Kazan, who he felt was too hefty to portray a dancer convincingly. Upon agreeing to helm the show, Bennett recast most of the ensemble, convinced Robin Wagner to replace his original realistic design with a sleek, stylized set, had Coleman and Fields rework their score, and brought in Neil Simon to help him rewrite the book, although final credit went solely to Bennett.

The musical opened on Broadway at the Uris Theatre on March 18, 1973 and transferred to the Mark Hellinger on August 1, 1973. Between the two venues, it ran a total of 296 performances and 25 previews. The director and choreographer was Bennett, with Grover Dale as co-choreographer and associate choreographers Bob Avian and Tommy Tune. Scenic design was by Robin Wagner, costume design was by Ann Roth and lighting design and projections were by Jules Fisher. The cast included Ken Howard, Michele Lee, Tommy Tune, Giancarlo Esposito, Thommie Walsh, Amanda McBroom and Baayork Lee.

Reviews were universally good, but there was no money for newspaper ads to quote them or television spots to promote the show. As a publicity stunt, New York City Mayor John Lindsay was persuaded to appear on stage during a production number set in Times Square, and the ensuing media coverage resulted in a boost at the box office. But the move from the Uris Theatre to the Mark Hellinger Theatre was costly, and although a post-Broadway run in Philadelphia and Boston was a financial success, Seesaw failed to earn back its sizable investment. During the Broadway run, Michele Lee left the show and was replaced by actress-singer-dancer-comedian Patti Karr. Karr had been Lee's standby.

When the Broadway run ended, Lucie Arnaz, John Gavin, and Tommy Tune starred in the national tour of the musical in 1974. (Gavin played the role for seven months on Broadway replacing Ken Howard.)

The Equity Library Theater, New York City, presented the musical in 1981. This production featured Diana Szlosberg (aka Diana Castle) as Gittel Mosca, Bill Tatum, Richard Ruth, Karen Ziemba and Thom Warren. Used in this production as the Act 1 closer was "The Party's on Me", a song used in the National Tour. The New York Times reviewer noted that this

was less a musical than a play, less a play than a musical, and not enough of either. The saving grace, to the extent that there was any, was the choreography by Mr. Bennett (who also served as director and partial librettist) and the high point of the production was Tommy Tune's long-legged, high-kicking dance up a set of stairs on a stage filled with balloons. Under the circumstances, this is not a musical that lends itself very well to revival, because its original merits depended so much on the individuals involved in the Broadway presentation.

The J2 Spotlight Musical Theatre Company, founded by Jim Jimirro (Executive Producer) and Robert W. Schneider (Artistic Director), presented an Off-Broadway revival as part of its inaugural season. The production opened on February 13, 2020 at Theatre Row. Directed by Robert W. Schneider, the production starred Stephanie Israelson as Gittel Mosca, Andy Tighe as Jerry Ryan and J. Savage as David.

== Songs ==
Act I

- Seesaw
- My City
- Nobody Does It Like Me
- In Tune
- Spanglish
- Welcome to Holiday Inn!
- You're a Lovable Lunatic
- He's Good for Me
- Ride Out the Storm

Act II

- We've Got It
- Poor Everybody Else
- Chapter 54, Number 1909
- The Concert
- It's Not Where You Start
- I'm Way Ahead
- Seesaw (Reprise)

== Awards and nominations ==
=== Original Broadway production ===
Year	Award	Category	Nominee	Result
1974	Tony Award	Best Musical		Nominated
1974	Tony Award	Best Book of a Musical	Michael Bennett	Nominated
1974	Tony Award	Best Original Score	Cy Coleman and Dorothy Fields	Nominated
1974	Tony Award	Best Performance by a Leading Actress in a Musical	Michele Lee	Nominated
1974	Tony Award	Best Performance by a Featured Actor in a Musical	Tommy Tune	Won
1974	Tony Award	Best Direction of a Musical	Michael Bennett	Nominated
1974	Tony Award	Best Choreography	Michael Bennett	Won
1974	Drama Desk Award	Outstanding Performance	Michele Lee	Won
1974	New York Drama Critics' Circle Award	Best Musical	Cy Coleman, Dorthy Fields and Michael Bennett	Runner-up
