= Ballroom (musical) =

- Original Cast Recording
- Music: Billy Goldenberg
- Lyrics: Alan Bergman; Marilyn Bergman
- Book: Jerome Kass
- Basis: Television Film; Queen of the Stardust Ballroom (1975)
- Productions: 1978 Broadway

Ballroom is a stage musical with a book by Jerome Kass and music by Billy Goldenberg and lyrics by Alan and Marilyn Bergman. Debuting on Broadway in 1978, it was nominated for the Tony Award for Best Musical.

Based on Kass's teleplay for the 1975 Emmy Award-winning television drama Queen of the Stardust Ballroom starring Maureen Stapleton, the plot focuses on lonely widow Bea Asher, who becomes romantically involved with Alfred Rossi, a mail carrier she meets at the local dance hall. Her dream of a happily-ever-after relationship is shattered when she discovers Alfred hasn't been as honest about his personal life as she thought.

== Synopsis ==
Bea Asher has been widowed for a year, but while her family has virtually enshrined her late husband, Bea won't accept "widow" as her designation for the rest of her life. She has opened a thrift shop that amounts to an ongoing garage sale of her own belongings. When her friend Angie urges her to get out of the shop and start living again and suggests that she visit a local dance hall, the Stardust Ballroom, Bea agrees. Outside the hall that night, Bea summons her courage and goes in. The Stardust represents the American ballroom-dancing tradition that thrived in an earlier era; time seems to have flattened out. There are no young people here to carry on the tradition — but the Stardust regulars will keep the flame burning.

On the Stardust floor, a foxtrot is in progress featuring the house band and singers. One spectacular dance succeeds another as Bea is drawn into the excitement. She meets Al Rossi, a mailman ("I'm in the government"). Like the other regulars, Al shakes off the tedium and the fear of daily life by dancing, and he spins Bea through cha-cha, merengue, waltz and, finally, a foxtrot. Bea hasn't felt this way in years. Al asks to drive her home, but Bea demurs; she goes home happy, however, and proud.

Helen, sister of Bea's late husband, waits for her to return home, thinking something terrible has happened. When she discovers that Bea has been out enjoying herself, she becomes outraged at the insult to her brother's memory. A moment after Helen furiously departs, Al phones Bea to say what a fine time he had and how much he hopes to see her again. Bea asks Al to phone again — but at the shop, not at home.

A month later, the ballroom regulars are in the middle of the Tango. Tonight, Bea lets Al take her home and invites him in for coffee. Haltingly, Al tries to tell her how he feels about her, and Bea has what she feared she would never have again, the feeling of being loved. But the next day, her family again intrudes. At the junk shop, Bea realises her plans to go back to the Stardust that evening conflict with an earlier promise to baby-sit for her daughter, Diane. Bea tries to get her sister-in-law to help, with no luck, then offers to pay for a sitter. When Diane tries to insist, Bea makes it clear that she has begun a new chapter in her life and that the ballroom will take priority.

That night, Al again waits for Bea at the Stardust. When she appears, she is no longer gray-haired and simply dressed, but has dyed her hair red and wears a beautiful gown. The transformation is Bea's brightest moment, and Al takes her around the floor in celebration. Al and Bea return to her home, obviously very much in love, and it appears Bea's fairy tale has reached its happy conclusion, but Al can no longer keep back the truth: he is married, and while he and his wife do not love each other, he will never end the union. This is all of Al that Bea will ever have, and the scene ends as she tries to come to terms with that.

The next week at the Stardust, the regulars learn the "new" dance craze, the hustle; tonight, also, the dancers will nominate candidates for a new Queen of the Stardust Ballroom. Angie nominates Bea, but Bea is distracted because Al isn't there. Finally, as everyone departs, Al arrives, all apologies, but even though Bea thinks she has accepted that this is how things must be, she feels afraid and vulnerable. She runs off, with Al watching her go. She returns home to find her family waiting for her: her sister-in-law has summoned Bea's son, David, from California to help them talk Bea out of her new way of life. Everyone except David attacks her, but Bea remains unshaken in her resolve: "Have you ever been in this house alone? Have you ever been everywhere alone?" Finally, Bea throws them all out. Left alone again, Bea confronts her situation and accepts her relationship with Al for what it is.

The ballroom holds the biggest night of the year. All the regulars wear tuxedos and gowns. When a drum roll signals the moment for naming the new Queen, Bea is chosen and pours out her heart to her new friends. She will probably never have Al to herself, but she has found a life. Al leads Bea through one more dance, joined by the entire company, as the curtain falls.

== Original cast and characters ==
Character	Broadway (1978)
Bea Asher	Dorothy Loudon
Alfred Rossi	Vincent Gardenia
Nathan Bricker	Bernie Knee
Marlene	Lynn Roberts
Shirley	Liz Sheridan
Natalie	Marilyn Cooper
Helen	Sally-Jane Heit
David Asher	Peter Alzado
Diane Asher	Dorothy Danner
Johnny "Lightfeet"	Howard Parker
Angie	Patricia Drylie
Martha	Barbara Erwin
Emily	Mary Ann Niles
Jack	John Hallow

== Song list ==
- A Terrific Band and a Real Nice Crowd - Bea
- A Song for Dancing - Marlene, Nathan
- One by One - Marlene, Nathan
- The Dance Montage - Company
- Dreams - Marlene
- Somebody Did Alright for Herself - Bea
- The Tango Contest - Company
- Goodnight is Not Goodbye - Marlene, Nathan
- I've Been Waiting All My Life - Nathan
- I Love to Dance - Bea, Al
- More of the Same - Marlene, Nathan
- Fifty Percent - Bea
- The Stardust Waltz - Company
- I Wish You a Waltz - Bea

== Production history ==
After eleven previews, the Broadway production, directed and choreographed by Michael Bennett, opened on December 14, 1978 at the Majestic Theatre, where it ran for 116 performances. The sets were by Robin Wagner, and Theoni V. Aldredge designed the costumes.

The production was Bennett's first project following A Chorus Line three years earlier.

== Awards and nominations ==
=== Original Broadway production ===
Year	Award	Category	Nominee	Result
1979	Tony Award	Best Musical		Nominated
1979	Tony Award	Best Book of a Musical	Jerome Kass	Nominated
1979	Tony Award	Best Performance by a Leading Actor in a Musical	Vincent Gardenia	Nominated
1979	Tony Award	Best Performance by a Leading Actress in a Musical	Dorothy Loudon	Nominated
1979	Tony Award	Best Direction of a Musical	Michael Bennett	Nominated
1979	Tony Award	Best Choreography	Michael Bennett	Won
1979	Tony Award	Best Costume Design	Theoni V. Aldredge	Nominated
1979	Tony Award	Best Lighting Design	Tharon Musser	Nominated
1979	Drama Desk Award	Outstanding Book of a Musical	Jerome Kass	Nominated
1979	Drama Desk Award	Outstanding Actress in a Musical	Dorothy Loudon	Nominated
1979	Drama Desk Award	Outstanding Featured Actress in a Musical	Patricia Drylie	Nominated
1979	Drama Desk Award	Outstanding Director of a Musical	Michael Bennett	Nominated
1979	Drama Desk Award	Outstanding Choreography	Michael Bennett	Won
1979	Drama Desk Award	Outstanding Costume Design	Theoni V. Aldredge	Nominated
1979	Drama Desk Award	Outstanding Lighting Design	Tharon Musser	Nominated
