= Michael Bennett (theater) =

American choreographer (1943–1987)

- Born: Michael Bennett DiFiglia; April 8, 1943; Buffalo, New York, US
- Died: July 2, 1987 (aged 44); Tucson, Arizona, US
- Occupations: Choreographer dancer director writer
- Spouse: Donna McKechnie (m. 1976; div. 1977)

Michael Bennett (April 8, 1943 – July 2, 1987) was an American musical theatre director, writer, choreographer, and dancer. He won seven Tony Awards for his choreography and direction of Broadway shows and was nominated for an additional eleven.

Bennett choreographed Promises, Promises; Follies; and Company. In 1976, he won the Tony Award for Best Direction of a Musical and the Tony Award for Best Choreography for the musical A Chorus Line. Bennett, under the aegis of producer Joseph Papp, created A Chorus Line based on a workshop process which he pioneered. He also directed and co-choreographed Dreamgirls with Michael Peters.

== Early life and career ==
Bennett was born Michael DiFiglia in Buffalo, New York, the son of Helen (née Ternoff), a secretary, and Salvatore Joseph DiFiglia, a factory worker. His father was Italian American and his mother was Jewish. He studied dance and choreography in his teens and staged a number of shows in his local high school - Bennett High School in Buffalo, NY - before dropping out to accept the role of Baby John in the US and European tours of West Side Story. He gave himself a new last name when he pursued this life in the arts, taking inspiration from his high school.

Bennett's career as a Broadway dancer began in the 1961 Betty Comden–Adolph Green–Jule Styne musical Subways Are for Sleeping, after which he appeared in Meredith Willson's Here's Love and the short-lived Bajour. In the mid-1960s he was a featured dancer on the NBC pop music series Hullabaloo, where he met fellow dancer Donna McKechnie.

Bennett made his choreographic debut with A Joyful Noise (1966), which lasted only twelve performances, and in 1967 followed it with another failure, Henry, Sweet Henry (based on the 1958 novel The World of Henry Orient, which had been filmed under that title in 1964 with Peter Sellers). Success finally arrived in 1968, when he choreographed the hit musical Promises, Promises on Broadway. With a contemporary pop score by Burt Bacharach and Hal David, a wisecracking book by Neil Simon and Bennett's well-received production numbers, including "Turkey Lurkey Time", the show ran for 1,281 performances. Over the next few years, he earned praise for his work on the straight play Twigs with Sada Thompson and the musical Coco with Katharine Hepburn. These were followed by two Stephen Sondheim productions, Company and Follies, co-directed with Hal Prince.

In 1973, Bennett was asked by producers Joseph Kipness and Larry Kasha to take over the ailing Cy Coleman–Dorothy Fields musical Seesaw. In replacing the director Ed Sherin and choreographer Grover Dale, he asked for absolute control over the production as director and choreographer and received credit as "having written, directed, and choreographed" the show.

== A Chorus Line and the 1980s ==
Bennett's next project was A Chorus Line. The musical was formed out of twenty hours of taped sessions with Broadway dancers. Bennett was invited to the sessions originally as an observer but soon took charge. He co-choreographed and directed the production, which debuted in July 1975 off-Broadway. It won nine Tony Awards and the 1976 Pulitzer Prize for Drama. He later claimed that the worldwide success of A Chorus Line became a hindrance, as the many international companies of the musical demanded his full-time attention. Bennett would later become a creative consultant for the 1985 film version of the musical but left due to creative differences. He always sought creative control over his projects, but Hollywood producers were unwilling to give him the influence he demanded.

The 2008 feature-length documentary Every Little Step chronicles the casting process of the musical's 2006 revival, with re-created choreography by Bennett's long-time associate Baayork Lee, and, in the course of the film, the saga of the original production is re-told through the use of old film clips and interviews from the original collaborators, including Lee, Bob Avian (who was the show's original co-choreographer with Bennett and the director of the revival), composer Marvin Hamlisch and the original's leading lady, Donna McKechnie.

Bennett's next musical was a project about late-life romance called Ballroom. Although financially unsuccessful, it garnered seven Tony Award nominations, and Bennett won one for Best Choreography. He admitted that any project that followed A Chorus Line was bound to be an anti-climax. Bennett had another hit in 1981 with Dreamgirls, a backstage epic about a girl group like The Supremes and the expropriation of black music by a white recording industry. In the early 1980s, Bennett worked on various projects, one of which was titled The Children's Crusade, based on a legendary story "Children's Crusade", but none of them reached the stage.

In 1978, he purchased 890 Broadway and converted it for use as a rehearsal studios complex for dance and theatre. In 1986, he was forced to sell it for $15 million due to stress-induced angina and the financial losses of the property. Two tenants purchased the building, and it remains a rehearsal facility for American Ballet Theatre, Eliot Feld's Ballet Tech, Gibney Dance Company, and others.

He always collaborated with his assistant Bob Avian, who was a lifelong friend.

In 1985, Bennett abandoned the nearly-completed musical Scandal, by writer Treva Silverman and songwriter Jimmy Webb, which had been developing for nearly five years through a series of workshop productions. The show was sexually daring, but the conservative climate and the growing AIDS panic made it unlikely commercial material. He was then signed to direct the West End production of Chess but had to withdraw in January 1986 due to his failing health, leaving Trevor Nunn to complete the production using Bennett's already commissioned sets.

== Analysis ==
Unlike his more famous contemporary Bob Fosse, Bennett was not known for a particular choreographic style. Instead, Bennett's choreography was motivated by the form of the musical involved, or the distinct characters interpreted.

In act 2 of Company, Bennett defied the usual choreographic expectations by deliberately taking the polish off the standard Broadway production number. The company stumbled through the steps of a hat and cane routine ("Side By Side") and thus revealed to the audience the physical limitations of the characters' singing and dancing. Bennett made the audience aware that this group had been flung together to perform, and that they were in over their heads. He intended the number to be not about the routine, but rather the characters behind it.

The song "One" from A Chorus Line functions in a different way. The various phases of construction/rehearsal of the number are shown, and because the show is about professional dancers, the last performance of the song-and-dance routine has all the gloss and polish expected of Broadway production values. Bennett's choreography also reveals the cost of the number to the people behind it.

Bennett was influenced by the work of Jerome Robbins. "What Michael Bennett perceived early in Robbins' work was totality, all the sums of a given piece adding to a unified whole". In Dreamgirls, Bennett's musical staging was described as a "mesmerizing sense of movement":

The most thrilling breakthrough of the extraordinary show is that whereas in A Chorus Line Michael Bennett choreographed the cast, in Dreamgirls he has choreographed the set. Bennett's use of [the plexiglass towers that dominated the set] was revolutionary. The towers moved to create constantly changing perspectives and space, like an automated ballet. They energized the action, driving it forcefully along. It's why there were no set-piece dance routines in the show: dance and movement were organic to the entire action. But Bennett had made the mechanical set his dancers."

== Personal life ==
Bennett was bisexual. In his younger days, Bennett had a relationship with Larry Fuller, a dancer, choreographer and director. He had a long professional and personal relationship with the virtuoso dancer Donna McKechnie, who danced his work in both Promises, Promises and Company and won the 1976 Tony Award for Best Actress in a Musical in the role he had created for her in A Chorus Line. They married on December 4, 1976, but after only a few months they separated and eventually divorced in 1979. In the late 1970s, Sabine Cassel, the then-wife of French actor Jean-Pierre Cassel left her family in Paris to live with Bennett in Manhattan, but the relationship soured. During his adult life, Bennett "took elaborate pains to ensure that the public never suspected he was gay. When he was diagnosed with AIDS in December 1985, (he) carefully disguised that fact as well".

Bennett's addictions to alcohol and drugs, notably cocaine and quaaludes, severely affected his ability to work and affected many of his professional and personal relationships. His paranoia grew as his dependency did. Worried by his celebrity and his father's Italian background, he began to suspect he might fall victim to a Mafia hit.

Bennett's last lover was Gene Pruit. In 1986 both Pruit and friend Bob Herr lived with Bennett for the last eight months of his life in Tucson, Arizona, where he received care at the University of Arizona Medical Center. Bennett died from AIDS-related lymphoma at the age of 44. He left a portion of his estate to fund research to fight the pandemic. Bennett's memorial service took place at the Shubert Theatre in New York City (the home at that time of A Chorus Line) on September 29, 1987.

== Awards and nominations ==
Year	Award ceremony	Category	Nominee	Result
1967	Tony Award	Best Choreography	A Joyful Noise	Nominated
1968	Tony Award	Best Choreography	Henry, Sweet Henry	Nominated
1969	Tony Award	Best Choreography	Promises, Promises	Nominated
1970	Tony Award	Best Choreography	Coco	Nominated
1971	Tony Award	Best Choreography	Company	Nominated
1971	Drama Desk Award	Outstanding Director	Follies	Won
1971	Drama Desk Award	Outstanding Choreography	Follies	Won
1972	Tony Award	Best Direction of a Musical	Follies	Won
1972	Tony Award	Best Choreography	Follies	Won
1973	New York Drama Critics' Circle	Best Musical	Seesaw	Nominated
1974	Tony Award	Best Book of a Musical	Seesaw	Nominated
1974	Tony Award	Best Direction of a Musical	Seesaw	Nominated
1974	Tony Award	Best Choreography	Seesaw	Won
1976	Tony Award	Best Direction of a Musical	A Chorus Line	Won
1976	Tony Award	Best Choreography	A Chorus Line	Won
1976	Drama Desk Award	Outstanding Director of a Musical	A Chorus Line	Won
1976	Drama Desk Award	Outstanding Choreography	A Chorus Line	Won
1976	Outer Critics Circle Award	Special Award	A Chorus Line	Won
1976	Pulitzer Prize	Drama	A Chorus Line	Won
1979	Tony Award	Best Direction of a Musical	Ballroom	Nominated
1979	Tony Award	Best Choreography	Ballroom	Won
1979	Drama Desk Award	Outstanding Director of a Musical	Ballroom	Nominated
1979	Drama Desk Award	Outstanding Choreography	Ballroom	Won
1982	Tony Award	Best Direction of Musical	Dreamgirls	Nominated
1982	Tony Award	Best Choreography	Dreamgirls	Won
1982	Drama Desk Award	Drama Desk Award for Outstanding Director of a Musical	Dreamgirls	Nominated
1983	Drama Desk Award	Outstanding Director of a Play	Third Street	Nominated
1984	Drama Desk Award	Special Award	A Chorus Line	Won

== Other media ==
A Class Act—A Musical About Musicals (2001). Bennett and lyricist Ed Kleban are portrayed in this partly fictionalized life story of Kleban, using some of Kleban's unpublished songs. A Chorus Line's number "One" is included in this musical.
