= Dennis Grimaldi =

American theatrical producer

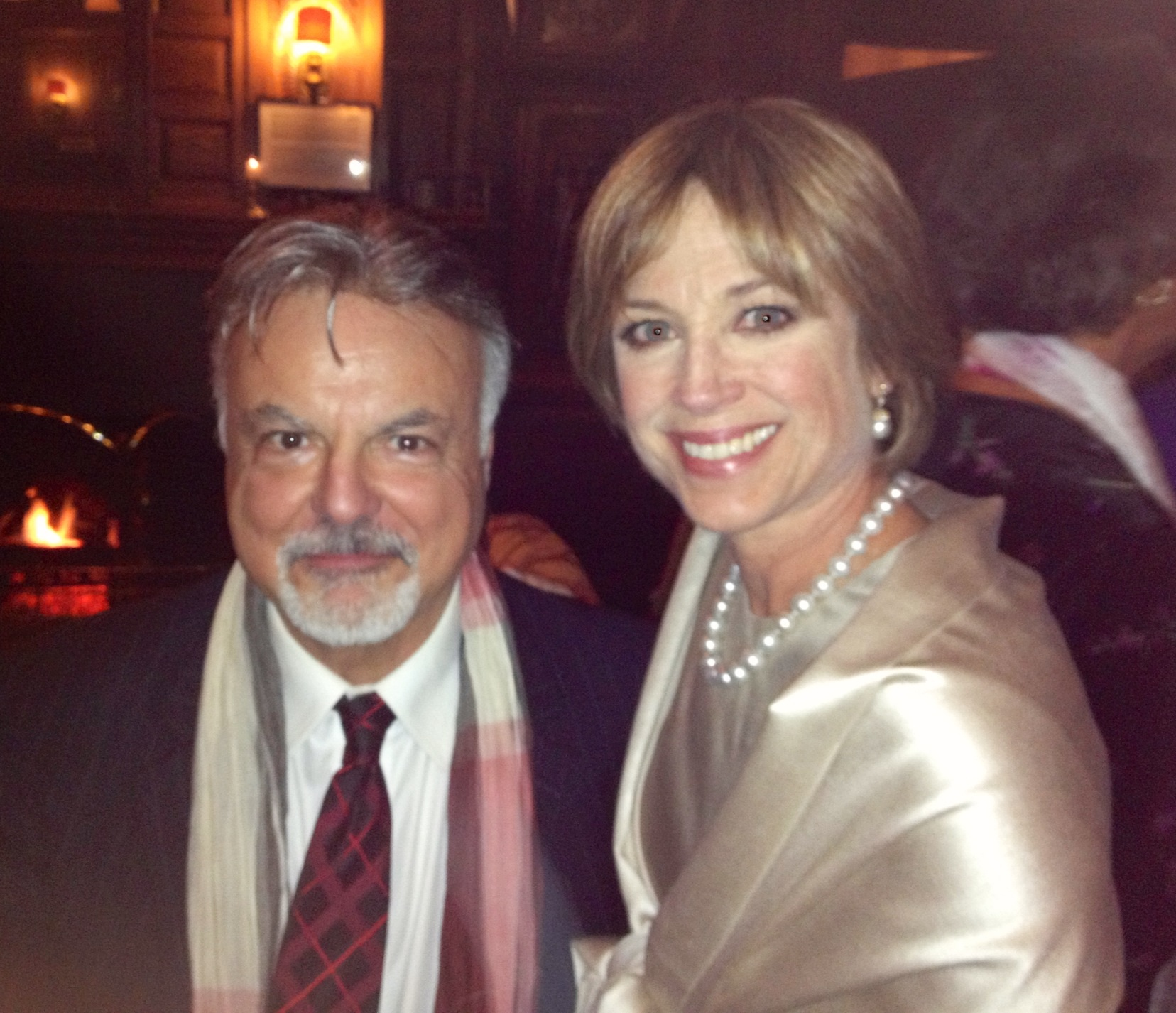
Dennis Grimaldi and Olympic Figure Skater Dorothy Hamill

Dennis Grimaldi is an American theatrical producer, director, and choreographer who has worked on Broadway, Off Broadway, television, and on London's West End.

== Biography ==
Dennis Grimaldi was born in Melrose Park, Illinois. He is a graduate of Proviso East High School. He studied dance at the Stone-Camryn School and Gail Larry School, Ronn Forella, Luigi and with John Aristides, and Jack Cole. Under the tutelage of Eugenie Leontovich, John Reich and Charles McGaw, he graduated with a Bachelor of Fine Arts in acting on scholarship from The Goodman School of Drama at the Art Institute of Chicago (now at The Theater Department of DePaul University), and also studied at Indiana University. Long time partner and spouse of 2 time Olympic Champion and Emmy Award Sport Analyst Dick Button.

== Stage career ==
As an actor and dancer, he co-starred in A Flea in Her Ear, Caesar and Cleopatra, The Sound of Music, Funny Girl, A Song for Cyrano (Cyrano), and Follies. As a dancer, he also appeared in Man of La Mancha, Hello, Dolly!, Promises, Promises, Sugar and other productions.

== Directing career ==
After his career as a dancer and actor, Grimaldi began directing and choreographing. In 1989, he formed Dennis Grimaldi Productions. For the stage, he first worked as an Associate to the Producers on A. R. Gurney's Sweet Sue. He recently co-produced the Broadway revival production of For Colored Girls/When the Rainbow is Enuf which garnered 7 Tony Award Nominations, The Drama Desk Nomination. Grimaldi produced Harry Townsend’s Last Stand by George Eastman at New York City Center. Starring Len Cariou and Craig Bierko and David Lansbury, who replaced Bierko. After receiving strong reviews and audience raves, the show was forced to close early due to the Pandemic and the lock down of New York Theatres. Grimaldi also Directed Alfo Learns to Love by Vincent Amelio and produced and directed an early Workshop Production of George Eastman’s Harry Townsend's Last Stand starring Len Cariou and Warren Bub. His many credits as Producer include The New York City Center Production of Harry Townsend’s Last Stand starring Tony Award winner, Len Cariou ( Blue Bloods) and Craig Bierko, Executive Producer for the television film of the Sondheim/Laurents/Styne Musical Gypsy which was filmed live at the Savoy Theatre in London and starred Olivier-winner Imelda Staunton, As a producer for Broadway, productions include The Heidi Chronicles (2015) with Elisabeth Moss, Jason Biggs and Bryce Pinkham, the Bernstein/Comden/Green musical On the Town 2014 revival, and The Realistic Joneses starring Toni Collette, Michael C. Hall, Tracy Letts and Marisa Tomei. In 2014 he won the Grand Slam of theater awards, the Tony, Drama Desk, Drama League and Outer Critics Circle Awards for "Best Musical" for the Broadway production of A Gentleman's Guide To Love and Murder starring Tony winner Jefferson Mays.

Grimaldi's other Broadway productions include the Deaf West Broadway revival production of Spring Awakening; Love Letters, the musical revival of On the Town, and the Australian tour of Driving Miss Daisy. He is co-producer of the Tony-winning George and Ira Gershwin musical, Nice Work If You Can Get It. The musical received 10 Tony nominations, 9 Drama Desk nominations and 9 Outer Critics Circle nominations.

In 2011, Grimaldi was involved with the tour and Broadway production of A Christmas Story, which was nominated for a Tony Award as Best Musical in the fall of 2012.

Other productions on Broadway and Off-Broadway include the 2011 Broadway revival of the Stephen Schwartz musical Godspell; Leslie Jordon's My Trip Down The Pink Carpet; also Angels in America, Other People's Money (Outer Critic Award), the Olivier Award-winning Rise and Fall of Little Voice, Girl's Room, Sally Marr (Tony nomination), Grace & Glorie, Artist Descending a Staircase, The High Rollers (Tony nomination for Vivian Reed), The Boys in the Band revival (with Michael Siebert an Obie Award), Any Given Day, and Party. He was also involved with the musicals Nunsense Jamboree, Fanny Hill and Annie Warbucks (Outer Critics Award) [2], which had the distinction to also perform for the White House, Like Love, and the musical adaptation of A.R. Gurney's Richard Cory, among others.

He also worked with Emanuel Azenberg on the Neil Simon productions of Lost in Yonkers (Kevin Spacey, Mercedes Ruehl) and London Suite (Carole Shelley, Jeffrey Jones) as well as the Broadway production Chita Rivera: The Dancer's Life with The Producer Circle and David Mamet's The Cryptogram (Felicity Huffman, Ed Begley Jr.) and, in 2015, the Broadway production of Terrence McNally's It's Only a Play starring Nathan Lane, Matthew Broderick, Megan Mullally, Stockard Channing, Rupert Grint and F. Murray Abraham. His many London productions on the West End and The Fringe include The Boys in the Band, Stephen Sondheim's Marry Me A Little (choreographer/associate director), actor Jack Gilford in Look To the Rainbow (choreographer/associate director) and John Lahr's Diary of a Somebody. He produced the Martin Charnin revue Something Funny's Going On. He was an associate on the Off-Broadway production of Oblivion Postponed by Ron Newseyer, directed by Nicholas Martin. He was an associate producer for Candid Productions, a television production company, for 15 years; producing programming for ABC, NBC and HBO. Grimaldi directed Stephan DeGhelder's Looking For Mr. Right and Vincent Amelio's Romantic Italian Comedy, Alfo Learns to Love.

== Awards and recognition ==
He was awarded the Robert Whitehead Award for Excellence in Theatre Production, the NY Film and Television Gold Medal Awards, the Outer Critics Awards and the Carbonell Award. Productions have also earned The Drama Desk, Drama League and Tony Awards, as well as the Pulitzer Prize.
