= Vivian Reed (actress, born 1945) =

American actor and singer

- Born: June 6, 1945 (age 81); Pittsburgh, Pennsylvania
- Occupation: Singer/actress
- Years active: 1968–present

Vivian Reed (born June 6, 1945) is an American actress, singer, and dancer. Born and raised in Pittsburgh, Pennsylvania, she was trained as a classical vocalist at the Juilliard School and originally planned on pursuing a career as an opera singer. Her path was reoriented into a career in popular music after she began performing at Pauline's Interlude Cafe in Harlem while a college student. Under the guidance of Honi Coles and Bobby Schiffman, the latter the owner of the Apollo Theatre, she became an R & B and Soul music performer under contract with Epic Records from 1968 to 1971. She performed frequently at the Apollo from 1966 into the mid-1970s. She also recorded two albums with United Artists Records in the 1970s.

In 1972 Reed made her theatrical stage debut in the short lived Broadway revue That's Entertainment. She returned to Broadway soon after in Don't Bother Me, I Can't Cope; replacing Micki Grant for six weeks in the original New York production. She would later appear in numerous productions of this show both in the United States and abroad in stagings spanning a twenty-five year period. In 1975 she originated the roles of Marsha and Young Irene in the musical Bubbling Brown Sugar, the work with which she is mostly closely identified. She was nominated for a Tony Award for this role, and won numerous accolades, including a Drama Desk Award and an Outer Critics Circle Award. In addition to appearing in the Broadway production of Bubbling Brown Sugar, she also appeared in both national and two European tours of the musical.

In 1980 Reed made her film debut in Headin' for Broadway. In the 1980s she worked and lived mainly in Europe and maintained an apartment in Paris. She formed a partnership with French theatre impresario and fashion designer Pierre Cardin, and recorded albums on the French record label Carrere Records. She also starred in several French language films, including portraying Josephine Baker in La Rumba (1987). In 1989 she returned to the United States where she was initially active in theaters in Florida. In 1992 she returned to Broadway as the Enchantress in The High Rollers Social and Pleasure Club; garnering a second Tony Award nomination for her performance. In 1994 she portrayed Queenie in the Toronto cast of Hal Prince's celebrated revival of Show Boat. In 1999 she portrayed the mother of Audra McDonald's character in the Broadway production of Marie Christine.

Reed has remained active in Off-Broadway and Regional theatre productions. She has also worked frequently as a night club and cabaret singer throughout her career, and has also performed at jazz festivals and with orchestras and other ensembles as a concert artist. Having previously taught singing at the Berklee College of Music, she currently works on the voice faculty at Marymount Manhattan College. She was awarded the 2025 Lifetime Achievement Award by the Manhattan Association of Cabarets.

== Early life and education ==
The daughter of Clyde and Lucille Reed, Vivian Reed was born in Pittsburgh, Pennsylvania on June 6, 1945. She grew up in the Reed family home on Wandless Street in the Hill District, and had two siblings, Clyde Jr. and Arcelia. Her earliest music experiences were singing gospel music in the Baptist church as a child. She began studying singing at the age of eight with Romaine Russell at the Pittsburgh Musical Institute, and gave her first voice recital at the age of 13. After graduating from Schenley High School, she attended the Juilliard School on a three-year scholarship with the intent of becoming an operatic soprano like Leontyne Price. She graduated from Juilliard in 1968 with a degree in vocal performance.

While a student at Juilliard in the mid-1960s Reed worked as a singing waitress at Pauline's Interlude Cafe in Harlem where she attracted the attention of the music critic of the New York Amsterdam News who stated she had a "musky mezzo-soprano voice and a most beguiling way with a song like "Summertime" or "Who Can I Turn To?". After completing her studies at Juilliard she pursued further training as a dancer. Her dance teachers included George Faison, Phil Black, and Ronald Dunham.

== Early career: Apollo Theater and Epic Records (1966–1972) ==
In her early career Reed worked frequently as a singer at supper clubs and resorts. She also performed at night clubs such as Basin Street South in Boston and the Fallen Angel in the Virgin Islands. On October 14, 1966 she made her debut at the Apollo Theater in a concert of Blues music. Others artists in this concert, which ran for a week of performances, included B. B. King and his band, Bobby Bland, Odetta, T-Bone Walker, Jimmy Witherspoon, and comedian Scoey Mitchell who served as the master of ceremonies. She became a recurring performer at the Apollo Theater where she honed her craft as a professional under the mentorship of Honi Coles and Bobby Schiffman. In December 1966 she was at the Apollo in concerts with Clyde McPhatter, Ruth Brown, George "Harmonica" Smith, and Ruby & the Romantics. She returned to the Apollo in 1967 in shows with Muddy Waters, Sonny Terry, Brownie McGhee, and Harold Cromer among other well known Blues musicians.

Reed was on the bill at the Apollo when Bill Cosby was the MC at the theatre in 1968; singing the song "Yours Until Tomorrow" by Gerry Goffin and Carole King. Reed recorded this song that same year for Epic Records; a single which sold more than 150,000 copies. The National Association of Television and Radio Announcers awarded her "The Most Promising Female Vocalist of 1968" prize at its national convention. Between 1968 and 1971 Reed recorded a total 20 songs for Epic Records; which encompassed one album, Vivan Reed (1968), and eight singles. These were re-released as a compilation set, Vivian Reed, Yours Until Tomorrow: The Epic Years, by Cherry Red Records in 2016. She sang another one of her singles, an R&B version of "Somewhere" from West Side Story, in concerts at the Apollo Theatre in February 1969. Other artists she shared billing with in shows at the Apollo in 1969 included Leslie Uggams, Ruby Dee, Richard Pryor, Ossie Davis, Frankie Crocker, and Jerry Butler.

In 1968 Reed was a recurring guest on the television program The Peter Martin Show. She subsequently appeared on The John Reed King Show and as a recurring guest on The Merv Griffin Show in 1968–1969. In 1969-1970 she gave a tour of concerts held at universities across the United States. In December 1969 she replaced an ailing Dionne Warwick for performances at the Apollo Theatre. In 1970-1971 she was a recurring guest on the variety television program Soul!; sharing billing with Muhammad Ali, Leon Thomas, and Archie Bell & the Drells among other guests. She also appeared as guest on The David Frost Show in 1970. In April 1970 she appeared in concert with Stevie Wonder at Kleinhans Music Hall. At the Apollo Theatre in 1970 she performed in shows with Little Anthony and the Imperials, Edwin Starr, Ronnie Dyson, Jimmie Walker, The Voices of East Harlem, and Lou Rawls.

On Martin Luther King Jr. Day in January 1971, just three years after King's assassination, Reed performed at a special event honoring King at the 369th Regiment Armory which was hosted by Hal Jackson and also included a performances by Ossie Davis and several church choirs. In February 1971 she returned to the Apollo to perform in a benefit concert for Shaw University. In March 1971 she was interviewed on the WNBC television program Positively Black. Following this she toured Europe with Joe Frazier and the Knockouts. From 1971 to 1977 she was a recurring guest on The Mike Douglas Show; first being booked on the program after baseball player Jackie Robinson recommended her to Moore. Moore stated in an interview that Reed "sounded like Aretha Franklin and Melba Moore". Among the guests she shared billing with on Douglas's program were John Lennon and Yoko Ono. Douglas had the couple serve as Reed's interviewers when they co-hosted the show with him for a week in 1972. This interview was later featured in Erik Nelson's 2024 documentary film Daytime Revolution for which Reed gave a retrospective interview. She also appeared on Mike Douglas's show with Bobby Seale, Barbara Walters, Don Adams, and Rita Moreno among others.

Reed was Johnny Carson's guest on The Tonight Show on August 26, 1971.

== Early theatre and television work (1972–1979) ==
Reed made her Broadway debut at the Edison Theatre in 1972 as Lena in the short lived musical revue That's Entertainment which featured the music of songwriting team Arthur Schwartz and Howard Dietz. A flop, the show closed after just four performances. Theatre critic Douglas Watt gave a scathing review in the New York Daily News but singled out Reed as "the best performer on the stage" and praised her singing of "By Myself" as "effective". Likewise Newsday critic George Oppenheimer wrote in his review, "The show was badly produced, directed, choreographed, and cast with the notable exception of a young black dazzler by the name of Vivian Reed who alone brought to it style and a star quality."

Following the close of That's Entertainment, Reed joined the Broadway cast of Don't Bother Me, I Can't Cope; substituting in for Micki Grant for six weeks while she took a hiatus from the show. The New York Amsterdam News stated she "scored a hit" in the production. After leaving the Broadway production she joined the Chicago production in October 1972. She later returned to the Broadway cast for further performances during the 1973–1974 season.

In 1973 Reed signed a contract with Atlantic Records, and her first single with the label, a version was Helen Reddy's "I Didn't Mean to Love You", was released in October of that year. Atlantic sponsored a promotional concert tour that year with stops in Atlanta, Chicago, Washington D.C., Philadelphia, and New York. In September 1974 she performed in the concert "A Tribute to Duke Ellington" at Avery Fisher Hall with Diana Ross, Carol Channing, Cissy Houston, Robin Kenyatta, and Johnny Hartman. In December 1974 she starred in a regional theatre production of Purlie Victorious in Kingston, New York.

In 1975 Reed joined the cast of the Amas Musical Theatre's production of Loften Mitchell's new musical Bubbling Brown Sugar. She portrayed the roles of Marsha and Young Irene in this production which was set in prominent Harlem nightclubs in the 1920s through 1940s and featured songs from this time and place. The work premiered Off-Broadway on February 14, 1975, at the Church of St. Paul and St. Andrew. In May 1975 she sang a song from the production on the Today Show. A national tour commenced in the summer of 1975 which included a run at the National Theatre in Washington, D.C. Reed remained with the production when it transferred to Broadway's ANTA Playhouse in March 1976. Clive Barnes in his review in The New York Times stated the Reed sang "a knock out version of "Sweet Georgia Brown". Her other song in the production was the Billie Holiday tune "God Bless the Child". Excerpts from the production were performed for national television broadcast from the Apollo Theatre on May 8, 1976.

Reed's performance in Bubbling Brown Sugar was a critical triumph with theatre historian Dan Dietz stating "she received some of the most rapturous notices of the decade for her knockout performance; with her clarion voice and electric dancing, she was the personifiction of Old-Time Broadway." The New York Times summarized critical responses as varying from “show stealer,” a “sinuous beauty” and a “sizzling witch.” For her performance she was nominated for the Tony Award for Best Actress in a Musical at the 30th Tony Awards, and won the 1976 Drama Desk Award for Outstanding Featured Actress in a Musical. She was also the recipient of an Outer Critics Circle Award for Best Actress in a Musical, a Theatre World Award, and an NAACP Award for her performance. People magazine named her of the "25 most intriguing people" of 1976.

In June 1976 Reed, Sammy Davis Jr., and Cab Calloway were the headliners for a benefit concert given at Carnegie Hall to raise funds for the Harlem-Dowling Children's Service. In September 1976 she was a guest on Dinah Shore's talk show Dinah! in a broadcast with Dee Dee Bridgewater, On November 7, 1976, she performed a song written for her by Marvin Hamlisch in an event honoring the life of Josephine Baker at the Metropolitan Opera House. The event was co-sponsored by Grace Kelly, Princess of Monaco, and Jacqueline Kennedy Onassis. In March 1977 she starred in a Bob Hope television special honoring vaudeville alongside Lucille Ball, Bernadette Peters, and Ben Vereen. That same month she appeared in the Sammy Davis Jr. television special, Sammy and Company.

By April 1977 Rice had left the Broadway company of Bubbling Brown Sugar to join the national touring company of that show. In the summer of 1977 Reed starred in Ron Milner's Off-Broadway a cappella musical Season's Reasons at the New Federal Theatre portraying the wife of actor Robert Guillaume's character. In 1978 she worked as a guest actress on One Life to Live. That same year her second album, Vivian Reed: Another Side, was released by United Artists Records (UAR). She made one more album with UAR, Ready and Waiting, which was released in 1979.

Reed joined the European tour of Bubbling Brown Sugar which stopped in more than 18 cities; beginning with Amsterdam where it opened on September 1, 1978. The show included stops in cities in Germany, Austria, and France; including a six month long run in Paris. When the tour ended in 1979 she remained in Europe; performing in the summer galas in Monte Carlo. She captured the attention of Pierre Cardin, who booked her for performances at his Parisian theatre, L’espace Cardin.

== Life and career in Europe in the 1980s ==
Reed starred with Rex Smith and Terri Treas in the 1980 film Headin' for Broadway. That same year she returned to Broadway as Mollie in Micki Grant's short lived musical It's So Nice to Be Civilized (1980). The failure of the show was largely placed on Grant, while its stars were credited with bringing strong talent to poor material. Douglas Watt in his review in New York Daily News wrote, "Then with a maudlin tribute to a shopping-bag lady (the latter turns into a ballet dancer as the song is sung) called "Like a Lady" that [Vivian] Reed informs with something of the powerful conviction that Piaf brought to her street ballads. Reed has everything—looks, grace, voice, everything but the smashing material she needs. Even so, she kills." In September 1980 she performed in concert with the Philly Pops orchestra at the Academy of Music in Philadelphia.

Reed's career was primarily centered in Europe during the 1980s and she maintained an apartment in Paris where she performed regularly in nightclubs and cabarets. She also was a regular performer in nightclubs in Monte Carlo during this decade, and performed in venues in Japan, Italy and Chile. She released three albums with the French label Carrere Records: Vivian Reed (1981) and Live At The Espace Cardin (1982). In 1982 she filmed a concert for television broadcast in the United Kingdom which aired on Television Centre, London, and Television South. She portrayed the part of Eugénie in the 1983 French film L'Africain directed by Philippe de Broca and starring Catherine Deneuve.

Reed reprised her role in Bubbling Brown Sugar for a second European tour which began at the Birmingham Hippodrome in England in April 1893. Other stops in England on this tour included the Theatre Royal, Nottingham and the Palace Theatre, Manchester. She was nominated for a Manchester Evening News Theatre Award for her performance. In 1984 she filmed another concert for British television, this time for ITV. Her television special Vivian Reed in Paris was broadcast on Granada Television in 1985. She also appeared in television specials in France, one of which featured choreography by Rick Odums, and toured Europe in the musical Sophisticated Ladies.

Reed portrayed Josephine Baker in the 1987 French film La Rumba, a gangster picture set in the criminal underworld of 1930s Paris in which Reed was featured singing one of Baker's songs, "J'ai deux amours". Her television special Vivian Reed in Performance was broadcast on PBS in December 1987. In 1989 she returned to the United States to appear at the Coconut Grove Playhouse in Miami as The Girl in The Roar of the Greasepaint – The Smell of the Crowd with Larry Kert as Sir and Obba Babatundé as Cocky. The Miami Herald stated that "Vivian Reed is husky-voiced perfection, the embodiment of grace and sensuality." She was nominated for a Carbonell Award for Best Actress in a Musical for performance in this show.

== 1990s ==
In March 1990 Reed's father Clyde, an amateur gospel singer well known locally in Pittsburgh, died. The following month Reed starred in a production of Don't Bother Me, I Can't Cope at the Fort Lauderdale Theatre with the Vinnette Carroll Repertory Company; revisiting the part she had played on Broadway and in Chicago which contained nine songs for her character. The Miami Herald review stated the following

"A lithe woman, with a deep tremendously expressive voice, Reed does more than sing her songs. She brings her actor's arsenal to them, turning them into little dramas, unforgettable ones at that. Listen to her sing the healing "So Little Time" or the sexy "My Love's So Good". Or marvel at her soaring duets... You just want Reed to rush right out and record an album so your pleasure in listening to her won't be so ephemeral."

In 1991 Reed returned to the Coconut Grove Playhouse in the musical revue Blues In the Night which she co-starred in with Roz Ryan and Leilani Jones. She portrayed the Enchantress in The High Rollers Social and Pleasure Club at Broadway's Helen Hayes Theatre in 1992; a role for which she received a second Tony Award nomination for Best Featured Actress in a Musical. She received positive reviews in this show for her performance of the song "You Can Have My Husband, But Don't Mess With My Man". In June 1992 she sang at a benefit for the New-York Historical Society which also featured performances by Paul Newman, Beverly Sills, Cy Coleman, Anthony Quinn, and other celebrities. Later that year she gave cabaret shows at The Supper Club at 240 W. 47th st that were host by drag queen Lady Bunny. She continued to perform there in 1993.

In December 1993 she portrayed the part of Cafe O'Lay in Duke Ellington's opera Queenie Pie at the Brooklyn Academy of Music with the Brooklyn Philharmonic Orchestra and Melba Moore in the title role. That same month she sang at a benefit concert to raise money for the Manhattan Center for the Living, a charity supporting those living with HIV and AIDS, that was hosted by Susan Sarandon and also featured performances by Daisy Eagan, Jerry Stiller, Judy Kaye, and Betty Buckley among others. In August 1994 she succeeded Gretha Boston as Queenie in Hal Prince's celebrated 1994 revival of Show Boat during its run in Toronto with her fellow cast members including Chloris Leachman as Parthy, Robert Morse as Captain Andy, Patti Cohenour as Magnolia, Hugh Panaro as Ravenal, Valarie Pettiford as Julie, and Dan Tullis Jr. as Joe. The Toronto Star critic Geoff Chapman wrote the following:

"Audiences can't help loving Vivian Reed as Queenie. She gets the solo spotlight for just three songs out of 24. Her acting part is at best a featured role. But in those just three songs – "Can't Help Lovin' Dat Man", "Misry's Comin' Aroun'" and Queenie's Ballyhoo" – You could swear there's three different people warbling their hearts out... It's a mark of Reed's versatility that she brings almost operatic passion to "Misry", the gloomiest Show Boat tune and one that's been left out of many stage versions, while managing upbeat, bluesy optimism for "Lovin", and letting it all hang out for "Ballyhoo" in manner she accurately describes as a 'straight belt'. While her singing voice is splendidly flexible, she displays equivalent versatility on the acting side of her part, performing with surprising fervor as Queenie, who's not much more than a maid.

Reed continued with the Show Boat production after it left Toronto on tour in 1995. She was only on the tour for a short period; leaving it after its stop in St. Paul, Minnesota. In July 1995 she performed with the Duke Ellington Band in a tribute concert to Phyllis Hyman, who had recently died, at the Blue Note Jazz Club in New York City. In 1996 she was engaged at the Rainbow Room where she appeared with Maxine Brown and Bunny Sigler in concerts of Rhythm and blues music. In February 1997 she was one of three singers who were invited to entertain the guests at the official Grammy Awards after party hosted by Clive Davis with the others being Darlene Love and Merry Clayton. In May 1997 she performed with Linda Eder in a benefit concert for the Manhattan Plaza AIDS Project. Later that year she starred in the Crossroads Theatre production of Don't Bother Me, I Can't Cope.

In January 1998 Reed performed in the 92nd Street Y's Lyrics & Lyricist concert series; performing in "The Greatest Hits of Irving Berlin". The following April she starred as Susannah in the musical Tintypes at Hartford Stage with The Republican critic singling out her performance of "Nobody" as the "pinnacle of the show". She remained with the production when it traveled to San Diego's Old Globe Theatre in June 1998. In August 1998 she appeared in concert with Jeff Harnar at the Guild Hall of East Hampton in the program "Red, Hot, and the Blues". In December 1998 she performed at the Museum of Television & Radio in a concert celebrating the sixth anniversary of WQEW radio. In 1999 she portrayed the mother of Audra McDonald's character in the 1999 Broadway operatic musical Marie Christine at Lincoln Center's Vivian Beaumont Theater.

== 2000s to present ==
In 2000, Reed portrayed Lena Horne in the premiere of Lynne Taylor-Corbett's ballet More Than a Song with the Pittsburgh Ballet Theatre; a work she later reprised with the company in 2002. She also performed at the 2nd Annual Lena Horne Awards held in New York City at the Ford Center for the Performing Arts. This event was hosted by Bill Cosby and honored Rosie O'Donnell with the Lena Mentor Award and Quincy Jones with the Lena Legend Award.

In 2001 she starred as The Devil's Wife in Denver Center Theatre Company's production of Pork Pie, A Mythic Jazz Fable. That same year she portrayed Angel Allen in Pearl Cleage's Blues for an Alabama Sky at the Cleveland Play House (CPH). She returned to CPH in February 2003 as Lily in Crumbs from the Table of Joy. In March 2003 she performed with Lillias White, Cicely Tyson, Chuck Cooper, and Pamela Isaacs in a benefit concert version of Bubbling Brown Sugar at the John Houseman Theatre to raise funds for Amas Musical Theatre. The following month she performed with Black Door Dance Ensemble in Miami in a Cole Porter focused cabaret show she wrote and directed called Red Hot & Cole.

In January and February 2004 Reed portrayed jazz and blues sing Alberta Hunter in the premiere of Marion J. Caffey's Cookin' at the Cookery at the Alabama Shakespeare Festival. She performed in another new creation by Caffey, Three Mo' Divas, with the San Diego Repertory Theatre in March–April 2004 which required performing a wide range of music from opera arias, to jazz standards, and R & B music. She performed in this show again at the Arena Stage in both 2005 and 2006 with Gretha Boston and Nina Negri. In February 2005 she performed in Kuntu Repertory Theatre's production of Bubbling Brown Sugar. In October 2005 she performed the part of Meg in Amas Musical Theatre's concert version of Damn Yankees which reset the story in the context of Negro league baseball.

In 2007 Reed starred in the Off-Broadway play The Second Tosca by Tom Rowan at the 45th Street Theater. She produced and starred as Misha, a homeless woman, in the 2009 short film What Goes Around which was written by Angela Gibbs. She created and directed the revue Virtuosity: A Song and Dance Revue which played at the St. Lawrence Centre for the Arts in 2010. After this she took time off from performing to care for her ailing mother in Pittsburgh who died in Reed's arms in 2012.

In October 2012 Reed portrayed Panama Jones in a workshop of the musical revue One For My Baby; a show that served as a showcase of the works of Harold Arlen. She later workshopped the musical The Countess of Storyville at the Peter Jay Sharp Theater in 2014. In 2015 she returned to the Apollo Theatre as Aunt Susan in the musical Invisible Life which had a cast led by Frenchie Davis and Brenda Braxton. That same year she performed at The Town Hall in the tribute concert “Piaf: A Centennial Celebration”; marking the hundredth anniversary of Edith Piaf's birth.

In 2016 Reed performed at the 27th New York Cabaret Convention which was produced by the Mabel Mercer Foundation. Stephen Holden in The New York Times wrote the following, "Most formidable of all was Vivian Reed, a haughty, ferociously intense descendant of Lena Horne, who eviscerated “Believe in Yourself,” the inspirational ballad from The Wiz." That same year she presented her one-woman cabaret show Standards and More at the Metropolitan Room.

In 2017 she gave a series of five different cabaret shows at 54 Below honoring the life and legacy of Lena Horne in recognition of the centenary of her birth. That same year she portrayed Momma in the Off-Broadway revival of Hallelujah, Baby! at the York Theatre with Stephanie Umoh portraying her daughter, Georgina. In 2018 she performed the role of Madame Pernelle in Molière's Tartuffe at the Shakespeare Theatre of New Jersey. In 2019 she brought her show Little Bit of Soul, Little Bit of Pop to Midtown’s Green Room.

She was the recipient of the 2025 Lifetime Achievement Award by the Manhattan Association of Cabarets.

== Teaching ==
Reed taught about vocal performance course at the Berklee College of Music in Boston. While there she established an annual concert event called "Singer's Night." She is a vocal professor on the staff of Marymount Manhattan College in New York City.

== Partial discography ==
=== Albums ===
- Vivian Reed (1968, Epic Records)
- Vivian Reed: Another Side (1978, United Artists Records)
- Ready and Waiting (1979, United Artists Records)
- Vivian Reed (1981, Carrere Records)
- Live At The Espace Cardin (1982, Carrere Records)
- Vivian Reed, Yours Until Tomorrow: The Epic Years (2016, compilation album released by Cherry Red Records)
