= From My Hometown =

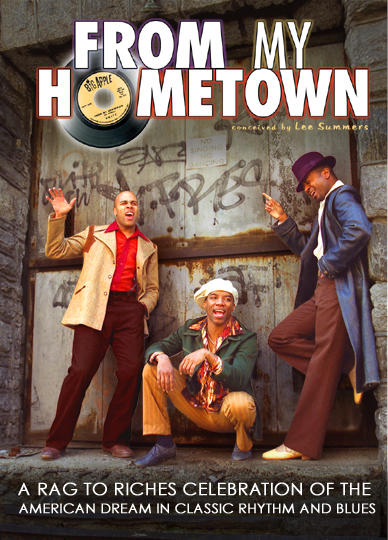
- Cover for the Off BroadwayPlaybill musical From My Hometown. Pictured: Kevin R. Free, Rodney Hicks & Andre Garner
- Music: Rhythm and Blues Hits & Original music by Lee Summers, Ty Stephens & Will Barrow
- Lyrics: Lee Summers, & Ty Stephens
- Book: Lee Summers, Ty Stephens & Herbert Rawlings, Jr.
- Basis: A rag to riches story of three soul singers, featuring well-known Rhythm and Blues hit songs.
- Productions: 2004 Off Broadway

From My Hometown is an Off Broadway musical that was conceived by Lee Summers, book by Summers, Ty Stephens, and Herbert Rawlings, Jr.. Born at the now-defunct cabaret room, "LaPlace," with Kevin Ramsey as director and co-choreographer with Leslie Dockery; (choreographer)Robert Fowler as associate choreographer and Will Barrow as musical director, Lee Summers, Ty Stephens and Herbert Rawlings, Jr. built the story from their own autobiographical stories, creating the roles of Memphis, Philly and Detroit. The musical was first premiered in a full production at the Milwaukee Repertory Theatre in 1998 then a second run at Milwaukee Repertory Theatre in 2000. From My Hometown had a developmental Off Broadway premiere in 2003 at the Kirk Theatre, produced by Lee Summers, Ben Blake and Amas Musical Theatre - followed by a commercial transfer to the Gramercy Theatre in 2004.

The musical features (licenses) twenty-four Rhythm and Blues classic soul songs made popular by artists such as James Brown, Otis Redding, Jackie Wilson and The Isley Brothers along with original music and lyrics by Summers, Ty Stephens, and Will Barrow.

== Synopsis ==
The musical follows three aspiring performers, Philly, Memphis, and Detroit - all new to New York and named after their Rhythm and Blues producing hometowns - as they try to make it big in show business, circa 1980. The three start out competing for the same job, but through individual and collective obstacles, eventually, decide to join forces to form a close-harmony singing group.

== Productions ==
From My Hometown was first performed in April 1998 at the Milwaukee Repertory Theatre and later had a developmental premiere at the Kirk Theatre on June 19, 2003, produced by Lee Summers, Ben Blake and Amas Musical Theatre followed by a commercial transfer to the Gramercy Theatre in 2004. Past performers have included Rodney Hicks, Lawrence Stallings, Matthew Johnson and Todrick Hall. Regional Productions include 2000 and 2011 encore productions at The Milwaukee Rep, The Meadowbrook Theatre, The Houston Ensemble Theatre, The American Heartland Theatre and more. In 2025, From My Hometown was added to the Concord Theatricals catalog. In January 2026, the musical was produced at the Winter Park Playhouse in Orlando, Florida.

== Reception ==
Variety reviewed the musical during its 2004 run at the Gramercy Theatre, writing that "It may not have the history or the soul of the Apollo, but the Gramercy is just funky enough to provide a hospitable long-term venue for this house-rocking party piece. Sharpened up since its tryout at Amas, this nostalgic tribute to the regional greats of rhythm and blues and soul music incorporates more than 30 songs into a heart-tugging storyline." Lawrence Van Gelder, writing for the New York Times, also wrote a review for the 2004 run, stating that "Lee Summers, who conceived ''From My Hometown'' and wrote it with Ty Stephens and Herbert Rawlings Jr., hasn't managed to pump much novelty into the all-too-familiar story with its offstage romantic subplots, and even a fairy tale like this shouldn't have such a gaping hole where the pals' big break ought to be. But ''From My Hometown'' means well, and sometimes it does very well indeed."

Between the Lines wrote a favorable review of a Michigan performance, stating that "For music lovers who miss lush melodic line, rich poetry and close harmony, "From My Hometown" is a delight. If "everything old is new again," we've waited long enough!"

=== Awards ===
From My Hometown received 8 Audelco Award nominations and a 2012 Wilde Award nomination, for "Best Musical," winning "Best Ensemble."
