= Phoenix Theatre (Indianapolis) =

Theater in Indianapolis, Indiana, US

The Phoenix Theatre is a theater in Indianapolis, Indiana, United States. It has presented productions since 1983. An Equity house, the Phoenix presents the Midwest and Indiana premieres of many Broadway and Off-Broadway plays, and has presented 94 World Premieres (through the end of the 2014–15 season). In May 2018, the Phoenix moved to a newly constructed, 20,000 square foot building, the Phoenix Theatre Cultural Centre, at 705 N. Illinois St. in the heart of downtown Indianapolis with two stages: the 144 seat Steve and Livia Russell Theatre and a flexible blackbox space, the Frank and Katrina Basile Theatre (capacity of 90). As of 2024, Phoenix has rebranded as Phoenix Theatre Cultural Centre where it houses 7 resident theatre companies. They are Actors Ink Theatre Company, American Lives Theatre, Eclipse, Indianapolis Shakespeare Company, Naptown African American Theatre Collective, Phoenix Theatre, and Summit Performance Indianapolis. Its previous location was at 749 N. Park Ave. in downtown Indianapolis near Massachusetts Avenue, the Phoenix operated a 130-seat proscenium style Mainstage and 75-seat downstairs cabaret.

It was founded by Bryan D. Fonseca in 1983, initially to perform the three-part (three evening) science fiction play, Warp!. Both venues are housed along with administrative offices in a renovated 1907 church where Jim Jones once preached, a fact that was brought into their production of Hedwig and the Angry Inch. The Phoenix Theatre is a member of the National New Play Network and the League of Indianapolis Theatres, and is supported by the Indiana Arts Commission, the Arts Council of Indianapolis, and the National Endowment for the Arts, as well as local corporate and foundation funders and more than 400 individual donors.

The Phoenix typically produces 10-12 shows per season, which most production being local regional premieres. They mostly produce plays written within the previous five years, and rarely produce shows more than one time (exceptions are Avenue Q and The Zippers of Zoomerville). Shows produced by the Phoenix are always issue-oriented, hoping to incite conversation along with the entertainment. They have often featured plays dealing with sexuality, homosexuality, women's issues, AIDS, African-American issues (they have done all of August Wilson's plays as they became available for regional theatre use), abuse, and mental disorders. The Phoenix is committed to hiring local artists, and almost all of their talent pool of designers and actors comes from Indianapolis or nearby cities.

== Bryan Fonseca ==
Bryan Fonseca is the founding and former Producing Director of the Phoenix Theatre. (He was replaced in June 2018). He has played a role in the Indianapolis theatre community since 1979. Prior to the Phoenix, Bryan served as the artistic director for the Broad Ripple Playhouse and developed a short-lived alternative stage at the Indianapolis Booth Tarkington Civic Theatre – Studio C. Bryan has received an Achievement and Service award from the Indiana Theatre Association, two Artist Fellowship awards from the Indiana State Arts Commission and two Creative Renewal Fellowships from the Arts Council of Indianapolis/Lilly Endowment. Over the years, he transferred six Phoenix shows to Chicago including his original concert production, Prine: A Tribute Concert, which was performed at the Viaduct Theatre. Following his departure from the Phoenix, Fonseca founded the Fonseca Theatre Company on Indianapolis’ near west side. Fonseca died of complications from the COVID-19 virus in September 2020.

== A Very Phoenix Xmas ==
The Phoenix produced an annual holiday show called A Very Phoenix Xmas from 2005 to 2019 curated by Producing Director Bryan Fonseca. The show featured original holiday-themed sketch comedy, musical numbers, dances, and variety acts (such as an aerial silk act) created but local and national playwrights.

== Brew-Ha-Ha ==
In 1995, the Phoenix founded the original craft beer festival in Indianapolis, Brew-Ha-Ha, as a non-traditional fundraiser for the theatre. The outdoor block party took place just outside the Phoenix on the 700 block of N. Park Ave. between Massachusetts Ave. and E. St. Clair St. in the Mass Ave Arts & Theatre District. The final Brew-Ha-Ha was held in June 2018.

== National New Play Network ==
The Phoenix is a Member of National New Play Network (NNPN), the country's alliance of non-profit professional theaters that supports the development, production, and continued life of new plays. Since its founding in 1998, NNPN has commissioned 19 playwrights, provided more than 20 MFA graduates with paid residencies, and supported over 150 productions nationwide through its Continued Life of New Plays Fund, which creates "Rolling World Premieres" of new plays. Hundreds of artists have gained employment through these efforts all over the country where NNPN Member Theatres are located. In addition to The Andrew W. Mellon Foundation, NNPN receives support from the Doris Duke Charitable Foundation, the Harold and Mimi Steinberg Charitable Trust, the Shubert Foundation, and the National Endowment for the Arts. The Network consists of a relatively small group of 29 Core Members, who pioneer and implement collaborative new play strategies, and a growing group of Associate Members, who disseminate the Network's programs and strategies nationwide. In April 2015, NNPN received the Washington Post Award for Innovative Leadership at the annual Helen Hayes Award Celebration.

== Production history ==
(*=world premiere production) (**=NNPN Rolling World Premiere)

=== 1980s ===
1983–1984

- WARP! I, II, & III by Stuart Gordon & Bury St. Edmond
- Talking With… by Jane Martin
- Krapp's Last Tape by Samuel Beckett
- How I Got That Story by Amlin Gray
- Plenty by David Hare
- Lemonade by James Prideaux
- Cloud Nine by Caryl Churchill
- Summer Lights* by Sam Smiley
- Escapes* by David Stooks
- The Legs on Charlie's Car* by John Sarno
- Necessities* by Kathy Fletcher & Rita Kohn
- Sour Noodles* by Jim Watt

1984–1985

- Agnes of God by John Pielmeier
- Crimes of the Heart by Beth Henley
- The Lion in Winter by James Goldman
- Baby With the Bathwater by Christopher Durang
- March of the Falsettos by William Finn
- Dear John* by Marcia Cebulska
- True West by Sam Shepard
- Taking Steps by Alan Ayckbourn
- The Call* by Bruce Gelfand
- My Hand is Not My Heart* by Jack Randall Earles
- Prep Work* by Bruce Gelfand
- Porch Songs* by Pearl Cleage
- …And Stuff* by Peter Dee

1985–1986

- Stage Struck by Simon Gray
- Balm in Gilead by Lanford Wilson
- El Grande de Coca-Cola by House, Andrews, Shearman, Willis, & White
- As Is by William F. Hoffman
- A Soldier's Play by Charles Fuller
- Accidental Death of an Anarchist by Dario Fo
- Waiting for the Parade by John Murrell
- The Madness of Lady Bright by Lanford Wilson
- Days of our Dumping* by D.J.L. Neruda
- Don't Crush that Dwarf, Hand Me the Pliers by Firesign Theatre
- The Lesson by Eugène Ionesco
- Centaurs* by Marcia Cebulska
- Night Commander* by Silas Jones
- Replay* by Bruce MacDonald
- Prairie Sunset* by Richard Sutherland

1986–1987

- The Threepenny Opera by Bertolt Brecht & Kurt Weill
- *Orphans by Lyle Kessler
- The Real Thing by Tom Stoppard
- Ma Rainey's Black Bottom by August Wilson
- Shivaree by William Mastrosimone
- Hurlyburly by David Rabe
- Hair by Gerome Ragni, James Rado, & Galt MacDermot
- Dreams* by Nell Weatherwax
- Pumpkin Pie, Sweet Potato Pie, and Other Cultural Differences by Various Poets
- Cowboy Mouth by Sam Shepard
- Nice People Dancing to Good Country Music by Lee Blessing
- Grendel!* by John Gardner & Bart Simpson
- Spell #7 by Ntozake Shange
- Rap Master Ronnie by Garry Trudeau & Elizabeth Swados
- Not Funny* by Douglas Anderson
- Caril & Charlie* by Gram Slaton
- Ken's Brain* by Jim Mitchell

1987–1988

- Execution of Justice by Emily Mann
- …and when the bough breaks* by Marcia Cebulska
- Loot by Joe Orton
- Advice to the Players by Bruce Bonafede
- Sister Mary Ignatius Explains It All for You by Christopher Durang
- A Lie of the Mind by Sam Shepard
- Savage/Love and Tongues by Sam Shepard
- A…My Name is Alice by Joan Micklin Silver & Julianne Boyd
- Chug by Ken Jenkins
- Graceland by Ellen Byron
- The House of Blue Leaves by John Guare
- Cards & Beer* by Jack Randall Earles
- Rebels* by Gary Williams & Steven Ridenour
- Nightbreath* by Dennis Clontz

1988–1989

- Steel Magnolias by Robert Harling
- Miss Margarida's Way by Roberto Athayde
- Bouncers by John Godber
- Dreamgirls by Tom Eyen & Harry Krieger
- Laughing Wild by Christopher Durang
- Frankie and Johnny in the Clair de Lune by Terrence McNally
- Coastal Disturbances by Tina Howe
- Beach Party Nuclear Protest* by Jack Randall Earles & David Meek
- Lloyd's Prayer by Kevin Kling
- Aunt Dan & Lemon by Wallace Shawn
- Three Guys Naked from the Waist Down by Jerry Colker & Michael Rupert
- Mr. Right and Other Stories* by Linda Carson
- Mortal Risk* by Ron Marks

1989–1990

- Burn This by Lanford Wilson
- Beirut by Alan Bowne
- The Day Room by Don DeLillo
- Here I Am* by David Meek (cabaret)
- On the Verge (or The Geography of Yearning) by Eric Overmyer
- Some Things You Need to Know Before the World Ends (A Final Evening with the Illuminati) by Larry Larson & Levi Lee
- The Rocky Horror Show by Richard O'Brien
- Fences by August Wilson
- The Marriage of Bette and Boo by Christopher Durang
- The Boys Next Door by Tom Griffin
- Su Me* by Su Ours (cabaret)
- Boy's Life by Howard Korder
- Stiff Cuffs* by Christina Cocek & John DiAguino
- Elizabeth/Regina* by Linda Carson

=== 1990s ===
1990–1991

- Eastern Standard by Richard Greenberg
- T-Bone And Weasel by Jon Klein
- Split Second by Dennis McIntyre
- Vampire Lesbians of Sodom by Charles Busch
- Reckless by Craig Lucas
- Eleemossynary by Lee Blessing
- One Mo' Time by Vernel Bagneris
- Kennedy's Children by Robert Patrick
- Roosters by Milcha Sanchez-Scott
- Woman in Mind by Alan Ayckbourn
- The Mystery of Irma Vep by Charles Ludlum
- Lady & the Clarinet by Michael Cristopher
- Dorothy Parker-A Symptom Recital* by Leo P. Carusone
- Dragon Slayers* by William Rough

1991–1992

- Other People's Money by Jerry Sterner
- Lady Day at Emerson's Bar & Grill by Lanie Robertson
- Square One by Steve Tesich
- The Cemetery Club by Ivan Menchell
- Only Kidding! by Jim Gehoghan
- 4 AM America by Ping Chong
- Christmas on Mars by Harry Kondoleon
- The Heidi Chronicles by Wendy Wasserstein
- Angry Housewives by A.M. Collins & Chad Henry
- Joe Turner's Come and Gone by August Wilson
- The Lisbon Traviata by Terrence McNally
- Womandingo* by Sterling Houston & Arnold Aprill
- Objects in the Mirror are Closer than They Appear* by Lester Purley & Mark Cryer
- hip my heart* by Paulette Licitra

1992–1993

- M Butterfly by David Henry Hwang
- Dorothy Parker-A Symptom Recital* by Leo P. Carusone
- Lips Together, Teeth Apart by Terrence McNally
- The Promise by Jose Rivera
- Assassins by Stephen Sondheim & John Weidman
- Sight Unseen by Donald Margulies
- The Piano Lesson by August Wilson
- Blind Spot* by Michael Davis Sutton
- Candy Store Window* by Cherie Bennett

1993–1994

- The Good Times Are Killing Me by Lynda Barry
- Six Degrees of Separation by John Guare
- Su Ours: No E, No H, Noel* by Su Ours & Michael Klass (cabaret)
- Marvin's Room by Scott McPherson
- Death & the Maiden by Ariel Dorfman
- Three Ways Home by Casey Kurtti
- Mama Drama by Leslie Ayvazian, Christine Farrell, Donna Dailey, Mariana Houston, Rita Nactmann, & Anne O'Sullivan
- Pretty Girls, Not too Bright* by Dos Fallopia (Peggy Platt & Lisa Koch)
- Heart Timers* by Stuart Warmflash
- Veronica's Position* by Rich Orloff

1994–1995

- Falsettos by William Finn & James Lapine
- Keely and Du by Jane Martin
- Five Guys Named Moe by Clarke Peters
- Conversations With My Father by Herb Gardener
- All in the Timing by David Ives
- Jeffrey by Paul Rudnick
- Bewitched, Bothered & Bananas* by Dos Fallopia (Lisa Koch & Peggy Platt)
- Points of Deviation* by Scott Sandoe
- Scotland Road by Jeffery Hatcher

1995–1996

- The Search for Signs of Intelligent Life in the Universe by Jane Wagner
- If We Are Women by Joanna Glass
- The Holiday Survival Game Show* by Dos Fallopia (Lisa Koch & Peggy Platt)
- Six Women with Brain Death by Mark Houston
- Denial of the Fittest by Judith Sloan & Warren Leher
- Love! Valour! Compassion! by Terrence McNally
- Spike Heels by Theresa Rebeck
- Glengarry Glen Ross by David Mamet
- Pretty Girls, Not too Bright* by Dos Fallopia (Lisa Koch & Peggy Platt)
- The Katydid* by Michael Davis Sutton

1996–1997

- Whoop-Dee-Doo! by Howard Crabtree
- Three Viewings by Jeffery Hatcher
- The Holiday Survival Game Show* by Peggy Platt, Rick Rankin, & Lisa Koch
- A Tuna Christmas by Ed Howard, Joe Sears, & Jaston Williams
- Florida * by Marcia Cebulska
- Trick the Devil by Bill Harris
- Sylvia by AR Gurney
- All I Really Needed to Know I Learned in Kindergarten by Ernest Zulia, David Caldwell, & Robert Fulghum
- Worst of Dos Fallopia* by Dos Fallopia (Peggy Platt & Lisa Koch)
- Reading the Mind of God * by Pat Gabridge
- Girl Party * by David Dillion & Virginia Smiley

1997–1998

- The Old Settler by John Henry Redwood
- Poor Super Man by Brad Fraser
- The Holiday Survival Game Show* by Jack O'Hara
- Summer Games* by James Farrell
- Taking Sides by Ronald Harwood
- Durang/Durang by Christopher Durang
- Company by Stephen Sondheim & George Furth
- latitude* by Tony McDonald
- Party by David Dillon
- Bride of Dos Fallopia* by Dos Fallopia (Peggy Platt & Lisa Koch)
- Princess Warrior by Julie Goldman

1998–1999

- Angels in America: Millennium Approaches by Tony Kushner
- Angels in America: Perestroika by Tony Kushner
- The Holiday Survival Game Show* by Jack O'Hara
- How I Learned to Drive by Paula Vogel
- Mother Russia* by Jeffrey Hatcher
- No Way to Treat a Lady by Douglas J. Cohen
- Shakin the Mess Outta Misery by Shay Youngblood
- Gross Indecency: The Three Trials of Oscar Wilde by Moisés Kaufman
- The Gene Pool by Christi Stewart-Brown
- As Bees in Honey Drown by Douglas Carter Beane
- Lisa Koch and Friends* by Lisa Koch
- Touch* by Toni Press-Coffman

1999–2000

- Three Days of Rain by Richard Greenberg
- The Woman in Black by Stephen Mallatratt
- The Most Fabulous Story Ever Told by Paul Rudnick
- The Holiday Millennium Game Show* by Jack O'Hara
- Jackie: An American Life by Gip Hoppe
- The Beauty Queen of Leenane by Martin McDonagh
- Wit by Margaret Edson
- Beautiful Thing by Jonathan Harvey
- Journal of Ordinary Thought by David Barr
- Resident Alien by Stuart Spencer

=== 2000s ===
2000–2001

- Snakebit by David Marshall Grant
- The Gathering by Will Power
- Tongue of a Bird by Ellen McLaughlin
- The Santaland Diaries by David Sedaris
- Uh, Oh - Here Comes Christmas by Ernie Zulia, David Caldwell
- Bluff by Jeffrey Sweet
- The Vagina Monologues by Eve Ensler
- Fuddy Meers by David Lindsey Abaire
- Another American: Asking and Telling by Marc Wolf
- Bodies and Hearts in the Face of the Monster* by Toni Press-Coffman
- Woody and Me* by Brad Erickson
- Seven Guitars by August Wilson

2001–2002

- The Laramie Project by Moisés Kaufman
- Two Trains Running by August Wilson
- Ham for the Holidays by Dos Fallopia (Lisa Koch & Peggy Platt)
- Dirty Blonde by Claudia Shear
- This is our Youth by Kenneth Lonergan
- True to Scale* by Wendy Beldon
- savant* by Tony McDonald
- Goats* by Alan Berks
- Born to Goof* by Kevin Burke
- Lunching by Alan Gross
- Bat Boy: The Musical by Keythe Farley, Brian Flemming, & Laurence O'Keefe
- The Action Against Sol Schumann by Jeffrey Sweet

2002–2003

- Proof by David Auburn
- Flow by Will Power
- Hedwig and the Angry Inch by Stephen Trask & John Cameron Mitchell - starring Blaine Hogan, Jessica Benge, Jimmy Sizemore, Royston Lloyd, Steve Hayes and Ryan
- Over the Tavern by Tom Dudzick
- Praying for Rain by Robert Lewis Vaughan
- Stones in his Pockets by Marie Jones
- The Washington-Sarajevo Talks by Carla Seaquist
- The Home Team* by Kim Carney
- La Sangre Llama* by Toni Press-Coffman & Tony Artis
- Phideas8* by Mike Whistler
- Spain by Jim Knable
- The Handler by Robert Schenkkan

2003–2004

- The Goat, or Who is Sylvia? by Edward Albee
- Trucker Rhapsody* by Toni Press-Coffman
- Circumference of a Squirrel by John Walch
- Sophie Tucker: American Legend by Jack Fournier & Kathy Halenda
- Boston Marriage by David Mamet
- Curanderas by Elaine Romero
- Loving Lucy by Philip blue owl Hooser
- Take Me Out by Richard Greenberg
- Top Dog/Underdog by Suzan-Lori Parks
- Naked Boys Singing! by Robert Schrock
- And/Or* by Andrew Barrett

2004–2005

- The Exonerated by Jessica Blank & Erik Jensen
- Crowns by Regina Taylor
- Mrs. Bob Cratchit's Wild Christmas Binge by Christopher Durang
- Running With Scissors by Michael McKeever
- Blown Sideways Through Life by Claudia Shear
- Frozen by Bryony Lavery
- This Is My Body by Amy Fortoul
- Rounding Third by Richard Dresser
- Cabfare for the Common Man* by Mark Harvey Levine
- Further Mo' by Vernel Bagneris
- Bug by Tracy Letts

2005–2006

- Urinetown: the Musical by Greg Kotis & Mark Hollmann
- I Am My Own Wife by Doug Wright
- Every Christmas Story Ever Told!! by Michael Carleton, John Alvarez, & Jim Fitzgerald
- A Number by Caryl Churchill
- From My Hometown conceived by Lee Summers and written by Lee Summers, Ty Stephens, & Herbert Rawlings Jr.
- The Marijuana-logues by Arj Barker, Doug Benson, & Tony Camin
- Orson's Shadow by Austin Pendleton
- The Pillowman by Martin McDonagh
- The Sugar Bean Sisters by Nathan Sanders
- The Ice-Breaker** by David Rambo

2006–2007

- The Musical of Musicals (The Musical!) by Eric Rockwell & Joanne Bogart
- Nijinsky's Last Dance by Norman Allen
- The Parenting Project: Callie's Tally by Betsy Howie & The Hoosier Dads by Kevin Burke, Dave Dugan, & Brad Tassell
- A Very Phoenix Xmas* by Various Artists
- Ten Percent of Molly Snyder (Marta Solano) by Richard Strand
- tempOdyssey** by Dan Dietz
- Miss Witherspoon by Christopher Durang
- Rhythms by Chris White (hosted... presented by DePauw University)
- And Her Hair Went With Her** by Zina Camblin
- Fat Pig by Neil LaBute
- The Little Dog Laughed by Douglas Carter Beane
- Dos Fallopia: Desperate Spuddwives by Lisa Koch and Peggy Platt

2007–2008

- Altar Boyz Music, lyrics and vocal arrangements by Gary Adler and Michael Patrick Walker, book by Kevin Del Aguila - based on an idea by Ken Davenport and Marc Kessler
- Stuff Happens by David Hare
- A Very Phoenix Xmas* by Various Artists
- End Days** by Deborah Zoe Laufer
- The Lieutenant of Inishmore by Martin McDonagh
- Well by Lisa Kron
- Black Gold** by Seth Rozin
- Our Dad Is In Atlantis by Javier Malpica
- Some Men by Terrence McNally
- Murderers by Jeffrey Hatcher

2008–2009

- November by David Mamet
- Drunk Enough to Say I Love You? by Caryl Churchill
- June 8, 1968 by Anna Theresa Cascio
- On Thin Ice: A Very Phoenix Xmas 3* by Various Artists
- Love Person** by Aditi Brennan Kapil
- The Seafarer by Conor McPherson
- Mauritius by Theresa Rebeck
- References to Salvador Dalí Make Me Hot by José Rivera
- The Zippers of Zoomerville - or 200 Laps and a Lass* by Jack O'Hara with music by Jack O'Hara and Tim Brickley
- Octopus by Steven Yockey
- The Dos and Don'ts of Time Travel by Nicholas Wardigo

2009–2010

- The Most Damaging Wound by Blair Singer
- Shipwrecked! An Entertainment by Donald Margulies
- A Very Phoenix Xmas 4:Our Stockings Are Stuffed* by Various Artists
- The Housewives of Mannheim by Alan Brody
- Call Me Boricua!* by Ricardo Melendez
- Sunlight** by Sharr White
- Yankee Tavern by Steven Dietz
- Speech and Debate by Stephen Karam
- Reasons to Be Pretty by Neil LaBute

=== 2010s ===
2010–2011

- In the Next Room - Or the Vibrator Play by Sarah Ruhl
- My Name Is Asher Lev by Aaron Posner, adapted from the novel by Chaim Potok
- A Very Phoenix Xmas 5: Regifted* by Various Artists
- Norway by Samuel D. Hunter
- Goldie, Max, and Milk by Karen Hartman
- The Storytelling Ability of a Boy by Carter W. Lewis
- This by Melissa James Gibson
- The Zippers of Zoomerville by Jack O'Hara with music by Jack O'Hara and Tim Brickley
- Avenue Q Music, lyrics and original concept by Robert Lopez and Jeff Marx, book by Jeff Whitty
- With a Bang by Pete McElliott

2011–2012

- Spring Awakening Music by Duncan Sheik, lyrics and book by Steven Sater
- Jericho** by Jack Canfora
- A Very Phoenix Xmas 6: Our Goose Is Cooked* by various artists
- Current Economic Conditions* by Don Zolidis
- August: Osage County by Tracy Letts
- Freud's Last Session by Mark St. Germain
- Baktun 13 by Danel Malan
- Forever Sung* by Bryan Fonseca and Tim Brickley
- Next Fall by Geoffrey Nauffts
- With a Whimper by Pete McElligott

2012–2013

- Bloody, Bloody Andrew Jackson Music and lyrics written by Michael Friedman, Book by Alex Timbers
- Seminar by Theresa Rebeck
- A Very Phoenix Xmas 7: Getting Figgy with It* by Various Artists
- Guapa** by Caridad Svich
- Next to Normal Book and lyrics by Brian Yorkey, Music by Tom Kitt
- The Lyons by Nicky Silver
- Clybourne Park by Bruce Norris
- 4000 Miles by Amy Herzog
- Dos Fallopia* by Lisa Koch and Peggy Platt
- Love, Loss, and What I Wore by Nora and Delia Ephron, based on the book by Ilene Beckerman

2013–2014

- Vanya, Sonia, Masha, and Spike by Christopher Durang
- Rancho Mirage** by Stephen Dietz
- A Very Phoenix Xmas 8: Angels We Have Heard While High* by Various Artists
- Tribes by Nina Raine
- North of the Boulevard by Bruce Graham
- I and You** by Lauren Gunderson
- Spun by Emily Goodson
- Bless Me, Ultima by Rudolfo Anaya
- Cock by Mike Bartlett
- Miles and Ellie by Don Zolidis

2014–2015

- Clark Gable Slept Here by Michael McKeever
- Old Jews Telling Jokes by Peter Gethers and David Okrent
- A Very Phoenix Xmas 9: Flashing Through the Snow* by Various Artists
- River City** by Diana Grisanti
- The Cripple of Inishmaan by Martin McDonagh
- Buyer and Cellar by Jonathan Tolins
- Dontrell, Who Kissed the Sea** by Nathan Alan Davis
- Typhoid Mary* by Tom Horan
- American Idiot Lyrics by Billie Joe Armstrong, book by Billie Joe Armstrong and Michael Mayer
- Mr. Burns, a Post-Electric Play by Anne Washburn

2015–2016

- One Man, Two Guvnors by Richard Bean
- The Nether by Jennifer Haley
- A Very Phoenix Xmas X: Oh, Come Let Us Adore Us* by Various Artists
- Butler by Richard Strand
- Pulp** by Joe Zettelmaier
- On Clover Road** by Steven Dietz
- Leyenda* by Playwright-in-Residence Tom Horan and Bryan Fonseca
- Book of Merman by Leo Schwartz
- Acid Dolphin Experiment* by Playwright-in-Residence Tom Horan

2016–2017

- An Act of God by David Javerbaum
- Dogs of Rwanda* by Sean Christopher Lewis
- The Golem of Havana by Michel Hausmann
- How to Use a Knife* by Will Snider
- Human Rites by Amélie Nothomb
- The Open Hand by Robert Caisley
- Peter and the Starcatcher by Rick Elice
- Sex with Strangers by Laura Eason
- Static* by Playwright-in-Residence Tom Horan
- A Very Phoenix Xmas XI* by Various Artists

2017–2018

- Barbecue by Robert O'Hara
- Cry it Out by Molly Smith Metzler
- Fairfield by Eric Coble
- Fun Home music by Jeanine Tesori, book and lyrics by Lisa Kron
- Halftime with Don* by Ken Weitzman
- Indecent by Paula Vogel
- God Bless You Mr. Rosewater by Kurt Vonnegut
- Sweat by Lynn Nottage
- The Pill by Playwright-in-Residence Tom Horan
- A Very Phoenix Xmas XII* by Various Artists

2018–2019

- Apples in Winter* by Jennifer Fawcett
- Bright Star written and composed by Steve Martin and Edie Brickell
- Cabaret Poe by Ben Asaykwee
- The Children by Lucy Kirkwood
- The Christians by Lucas Hnath
- Hotel Nepenthe by John Kuntz
- White City Murder by Ben Asaykwee
- A Very Phoenix Xmas XIII* by Various Artists

2019–2020

- The Agitators by Mat Smart
- The Legend of Georgia McBride by Matthew Lopez
- Vino Veritas by David MacGregor
- A Very Phoenix Xmas XIV* by Various Artists

=== 2020s ===
2020–2021

- This season was cancelled due to the COVID-19 pandemic.

2021–2022

- Alabaster** by Audrey Cefaly
- Bakersfield Mist by Stephan Sachs
- Love Bird by K.T. Peterson
- The Magnolia Ballet* by Terry Guest
- No AIDS, No Maids: Or, Stories I Can't Fuckin' Hear No More by Dee Dee Batteast
- Panther Women: An Army for the Liberation** by India Nicole Burton

2022–2023

- Tick, Tick...Boom! book, music, and lyrics by Jonathan Larson
- The Rise and Fall of Holly Fudge by Trista Baldwin
- Wild Horses by Allison Gregory
- Two Mile Hollow by Leah Nanako Winkler

2023–2024

- The Body* by Steve Moulds
- A Very Phoenix Xmas XV: The Return of A Very Phoenix Xmas* by Claire Wilcher and friends
- And I Will Follow* by Bennett Ayres
- White City Murder by Ben Asaykwee

== See also ==
- List of attractions and events in Indianapolis
