= That's Entertainment (musical) =

That's Entertainment is a 1972 musical revue featuring the music of songwriting team Howard Dietz and Arthur Schwartz that uses orchestrations and arrangements by Luther Henderson. The show's book was crafted by uncredited writers. Historian Howard Dietz stated that the show's authors "created character names for all the singers and utilized snatches of dialogue in an awkward attempt to place the songs in a fabricated story context."

== Performance history and critical response ==
Produced by Gordon Crowe, directed by Paul Aaron, and choreographed by Larry Fuller, That's Entertainment premiered on Broadway at the Edison Theatre on April 14, 1972. The production closed after just four performances on April 16, 1972. The cast included David Chaney as Greg, Jered Holmes as Richard, Judith Knaiz as Carol, Michon Peacock as Adele, Vivian Reed as Lena, Scott Salmon as Jack, Bonnie Schon as Lucille, Michael Vita as Donald, and Alan Weeks as Sam.

Newsday critic George Oppenheimer wrote in his review, "The show was badly produced, directed, choreographed, and cast with the notable exception of a young black dazzler by the name of Vivian Reed who alone brought to it style and a star quality." Theatre critic Douglas Watt gave a scathing review of the show in the New York Daily News but also singled out Reed as "the best performer on the stage" and praised her singing of "By Myself" as "effective".

== Musical Numbers ==
Act 1

- "The Overture" (Company)
- Medley: "We Won't Take It Back" from Inside U.S.A., "Hammacher Schlemmer, I Love You" from The Little Show, and "Come, Oh Come to Pittsburgh" from Inside U.S.A. (Adele, Lucille, Scott, & Greg)
- "I'm Glad I'm Single" from The Gay Life (Richard)
- "(What's the Use of Being) Miserable with You?" from The Band Wagon (Richard and Carol)
- “Something to Remember You By” Three's a Crowd (Carol)
- "Hottentot Potentate" from At Home Abroad (Lena and Sam)
- "Day After Day" from Flying Colors / "Fly By Night" from Between the Devil (Company)
- "You Have Everything" from Between the Devil (Richard)
- "Blue Grass (Churchill Downs, Kentucky)" from Inside U.S.A. (Sam)
- "Fatal Fascination" from Flying Colors / "White Heat" from The Band Wagon (Lucille)
- “Right at the Start of It” from Three's a Crowd (Sam)
- "Confession" from The Band Wagon (Carol and Donald)
- "Smoking Reefers" from Flying Colors (Lena)
- "How High Can the Little Bird Fly?" from Follow the Sun (Jack)
- "Keep Off the Grass" (Greg)
- "I See Your Face Before Me" from Between the Devil (Adele and Donald)
- "Experience" from Between the Devil (Greg)
- "Two-Faced Woman" from Flying Colors (Sam)
- "By Myself" from Between the Devil (Lena)
- "That's Entertainment!" from The Band Wagon (Donald)

Act 2

- Dance Medley: "You and the Night and the Music" from Revenge with Music, "Louisiana Hayride" from Flying Colors, "Dancing in the Dark" from The Band Wagon (Company)
- "Triplets" from Between the Devil (Lucille, Richard, Greg)
- "High and Low" from The Band Wagon (Jack)
- "How Long Can a Little Worm Go?" from Follow the Sun (Carol)
- "Absent Minded" (Richard)
- "High Is Better Than Low" from Jennie (Carol and Jack)
- "If There Is Someone Lovelier Than You" from Revenge with Music (Greg)
- "I’ve Made a Habit of You" from The Little Show (Lucille)
- "I Guess I'll Have to Change My Plan" from The Little Show(Sam)
- "New Sun in the Sky" from The Band Wagon (Lena)
- "Farewell, My Lovely" from At Home Abroad (Adele)
- "Along Together" from Flying Colors (Donald)
- "A Shine on Your Shoes" from Flying Colors (Company)
