= 30th Tony Awards =

1976 US theatrical awards ceremony

- Date: April 18, 1976
- Location: Shubert Theatre; New York City, New York
- Hosted by: Eddie Albert, Richard Burton, Jane Fonda, Diana Rigg, George C. Scott and Trish Van Devere
- Most wins: A Chorus Line (9)
- Most nominations: A Chorus Line (12)

Television/radio coverage
- Network: ABC

The 30th Annual Tony Awards was held at the Shubert Theatre on April 18, 1976, and broadcast by ABC television. Hosts were Eddie Albert, Richard Burton, Jane Fonda, Diana Rigg, George C. Scott and Trish Van Devere.

== Eligibility ==
Shows that opened on Broadway during the 1975–1976 season before March 26, 1976 are eligible.

Original plays

- The First Breeze of Summer
- Habeas Corpus
- Kennedy's Children
- Knock Knock
- Lamppost Reunion
- The Leaf People
- Little Black Sheep
- A Matter of Gravity
- Me Jack, You Jill
- Murder Among Friends
- The Norman Conquests
- P.S. Your Cat Is Dead
- The Poison Tree
- Summer Brave
- Travesties
- We Interrupt This Program...
- Yentl
- Zalmen or The Madness of God

Original musicals

- Boccaccio
- Bubbling Brown Sugar
- Chicago
- A Chorus Line
- The Fifth Season
- Home Sweet Homer
- Me and Bessie
- A Musical Jubilee
- Pacific Overtures
- The Robber Bridegroom
- Rodgers and Hart
- Rockabye Hamlet
- Treemonisha

Play revivals

- Ah, Wilderness!
- Angel Street
- The Constant Wife
- Death of a Salesman
- Edward II
- The Glass Menagerie
- Hamlet
- The Lady from the Sea
- A Memory of Two Mondays
- Mrs. Warren's Profession
- The Royal Family
- The Skin of Our Teeth
- Sweet Bird of Youth
- They Knew What They Wanted
- The Time of Your Life
- Trelawny of the "Wells"
- 27 Wagons Full of Cotton

Musical revivals

- Hello, Dolly!
- My Fair Lady
- Very Good Eddie

== The ceremony ==
Presenters: Alan Arkin, Clifton Davis, Bonnie Franklin, Celeste Holm, Cloris Leachman, Michele Lee, Jerry Lewis, Hal Linden, Mary Martin, Mike Nichols, Christopher Plummer, Vanessa Redgrave, Marlo Thomas, Leslie Uggams.

The theme of the show was "The Ones That Got Away", a medley of memorable songs from past musicals that did not win the Tony performed by Linden, Davis, Lee and Uggams with Richard Burton performing the number from Camelot.

The medley included songs from:

- Annie Get Your Gun
- High Button Shoes
- Where's Charley?
- Miss Liberty
- Call Me Madam
- Paint Your Wagon
- Wish You Were Here
- Can-Can
- Peter Pan
- Mr Wonderful
- Bells Are Ringing
- West Side Story
- Flower Drum Song
- Gypsy
- Camelot
- Milk And Honey
- Stop the World – I Want to Get Off
- Funny Girl
- Do I Hear a Waltz?
- Sweet Charity
- Walking Happy
- How Now, Dow Jones
- Hair
- Purlie
- The Rothschilds
- Grease
- Pippin
- Gigi
- Shenandoah

Musicals represented:

- A Chorus Line ("I Hope I Get It"/"One" - Company)
- Bubbling Brown Sugar ("Sweet Georgia Brown" - Vivian Reed, Lonnie McNeil, Newton Winters)
- Chicago ("All I Care About" - Jerry Orbach and Company)
- Pacific Overtures ("Advantages of Floating in the Middle of the Sea" - Mako and Company)

== Winners and nominees ==
Source:BroadwayWorld

Winners are in bold

Best Play	Best Musical
**Travesties – Tom Stoppard**; The First Breeze of Summer – Leslie Lee; Knock Knock – Jules Feiffer; Lamppost Reunion – Louis La Russo II	**A Chorus Line**; Bubbling Brown Sugar; Chicago; Pacific Overtures
Best Book of a Musical	Best Original Score (Music and/or Lyrics) Written for the Theatre
**James Kirkwood, Jr. and Nicholas Dante – A Chorus Line**; Fred Ebb and Bob Fosse – Chicago; John Weidman – Pacific Overtures; Alfred Uhry – The Robber Bridegroom	**A Chorus Line – Marvin Hamlisch (music) and Edward Kleban (lyrics)**; Chicago – John Kander (music) and Fred Ebb (lyrics); Pacific Overtures – Stephen Sondheim (music and lyrics); Treemonisha – Scott Joplin (music and lyrics)
Best Performance by a Leading Actor in a Play	Best Performance by a Leading Actress in a Play
**John Wood – Travesties as Henry Carr**; Moses Gunn – The Poison Tree as Benjamin Hurspool; George C. Scott – Death of a Salesman as Willy Loman; Donald Sinden – Habeas Corpus as Arthur Wicksteed	**Irene Worth – Sweet Bird of Youth as Princess Cosmonopolis**; Tovah Feldshuh – Yentl as Yentl; Rosemary Harris – The Royal Family as Julie Cavendish; Lynn Redgrave – Mrs. Warren's Profession as Vivie Warren
Best Performance by a Leading Actor in a Musical	Best Performance by a Leading Actress in a Musical
**George Rose – My Fair Lady as Alfred P. Doolittle**; Mako – Pacific Overtures as Various Characters; Jerry Orbach – Chicago as Billy Flynn; Ian Richardson – My Fair Lady as Henry Higgins	**Donna McKechnie – A Chorus Line as Cassie Ferguson**; Vivian Reed – Bubbling Brown Sugar as Marsha/Young Irene; Chita Rivera – Chicago as Velma Kelly; Gwen Verdon – Chicago as Roxie Hart
Best Performance by a Featured Actor in a Play	Best Performance by a Featured Actress in a Play
**Edward Herrmann – Mrs. Warren's Profession as Frank Gardner**; Barry Bostwick – They Knew What They Wanted as Joe; Gabriel Dell – Lamppost Reunion as Fred Santora; Daniel Seltzer – Knock Knock as Cohn	**Shirley Knight – Kennedy's Children as Carla**; Mary Beth Hurt – Trelawny of the 'Wells' as Miss Rose Trelawny; Lois Nettleton – They Knew What They Wanted as Amy; Meryl Streep – 27 Wagons Full of Cotton as Flora Meighan
Best Performance by a Featured Actor in a Musical	Best Performance by a Featured Actress in a Musical
**Sammy Williams – A Chorus Line as Paul**; Robert LuPone – A Chorus Line as Zach; Charles Repole – Very Good Eddie as Mr. Eddie Kettle; Isao Sato – Pacific Overtures as Kayama	**Kelly Bishop – A Chorus Line as Sheila Bryant**; Priscilla Lopez – A Chorus Line as Diana Morales; Patti LuPone – The Robber Bridegroom as Rosamund Musgrove; Virginia Seidel – Very Good Eddie as Elsie Darling
Best Direction of a Play	Best Direction of a Musical
**Ellis Rabb – The Royal Family**; Arvin Brown – Ah, Wilderness!; Marshall W. Mason – Knock Knock; Peter Wood – Travesties	**Michael Bennett – A Chorus Line**; Bob Fosse – Chicago; Bill Gile – Very Good Eddie; Harold Prince – Pacific Overtures
Best Choreography	Best Scenic Design
**Michael Bennett and Bob Avian – A Chorus Line**; Patricia Birch – Pacific Overtures; Bob Fosse – Chicago; Billy Wilson – Bubbling Brown Sugar	**Boris Aronson – Pacific Overtures**; Ben Edwards – A Matter of Gravity; David Mitchell – Trelawny of the 'Wells'; Tony Walton – Chicago
Best Costume Design	Best Lighting Design
**Florence Klotz – Pacific Overtures**; Theoni V. Aldredge – A Chorus Line; Ann Roth – The Royal Family; Patricia Zipprodt – Chicago	**Tharon Musser – A Chorus Line**; Ian Calderon – Trelawny of the 'Wells'; Jules Fisher – Chicago; Tharon Musser – Pacific Overtures

== Special awards ==
- Lawrence Langner Award Winner (Lifetime Achievement in Theatre) - George Abbott
- Regional Theatre Award - The Arena Stage, Washington, D.C. (This award takes note of the company's balanced program of distinguished revivals and a broad spectrum of new works and American premieres of important foreign plays.)
- Mathilde Pincus, for outstanding service to the Broadway musical theatre
- Thomas H. Fitzgerald, to the gifted lighting technician of countless Broadway shows and many Tony telecasts. (Posthumous)
- Circle in the Square, for twenty-five continuous years of quality productions.
- Richard Burton

=== Multiple nominations and awards ===
These productions had multiple nominations:

- 12 nominations: A Chorus Line
- 11 nominations: Chicago
- 10 nominations: Pacific Overtures
- 3 nominations: Bubbling Brown Sugar, Knock Knock, Lamppost Reunion, The Royal Family, Travesties, Trelawny of the 'Wells' and Very Good Eddie
- 2 nominations: Mrs. Warren's Profession, My Fair Lady, The Robber Bridegroom and They Knew What They Wanted

The following productions received multiple awards.

- 9 wins: A Chorus Line
- 2 wins: Pacific Overtures and Travesties

== See also ==
- Drama Desk Awards
- 1976 Laurence Olivier Awards – equivalent awards for West End theatre productions
- Obie Award
- New York Drama Critics' Circle
- Theatre World Award
- Lucille Lortel Awards
