= Bonafede =

Bonafede is an Italian surname. Notable people with this surname include:

- Alfonso Bonafede (born 1976), Italian lawyer and former Minister of Justice until June 2018
- Bruce Bonafede, American author, award-winning playwright, and ghostwriter
- Carl Bonafede (born 1940), American-born Italian businessman
- Francis Bonafede (born 1939), Monegasque sport shooter
- Gennaro Bonafede (born 1990), South African racing driver
- Niccolò Bonafede (c. 1464–1533), Roman Catholic Bishop of Chiusi
- Salvatore Bonafede (born 1962), Italian composer and pianist
- Victor Bonafède (fl. 1920s), Monegasque sport shooter
