= Yours Until Tomorrow =

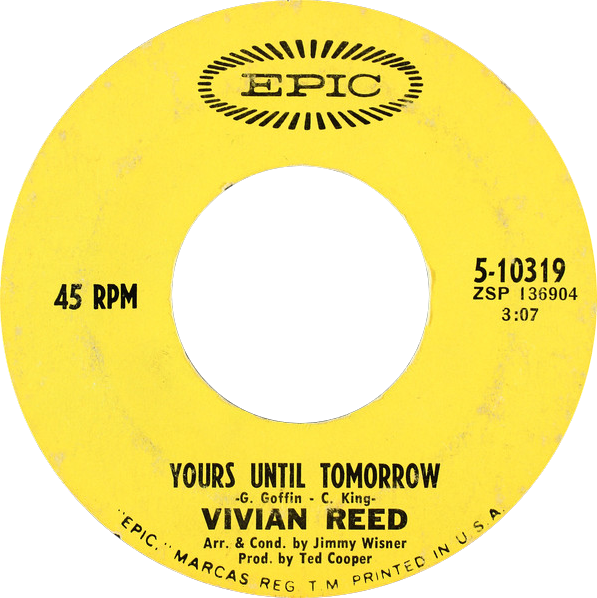
- Side B of the US single

Single by Vivian Reed
- A-side: "I Wanna Be Free"
- Released: April 5, 1968
- Label: Epic
- Songwriters: Gerry Goffin and Carole King
- Producer: Ted Cooper

"Yours Until Tomorrow" is a song written by Gerry Goffin and Carole King, recorded by Dee Dee Warwick in 1968. It was used as the B-side to her recording of "I'm Gonna Make You Love Me." Versions by, respectively, Vivian Reed and Gene Pitney performed on music charts.

== Charted cover versions ==
Musical theatre actress Vivian Reed covered "Yours Until Tomorrow" in 1968. Originally a B-side, her version reached number 113 on Billboard Bubbling Under the Hot 100, number 93 on the Cash Box Top 100, and number 87 on Canada's RPM Top Singles. The song was her only chart hit.

Gene Pitney recorded his version for his album She's a Heartbreaker, also called Pitney Today in the UK. The version peaked at number 34 in 1968.
