= Lee Summers =

American dramatist

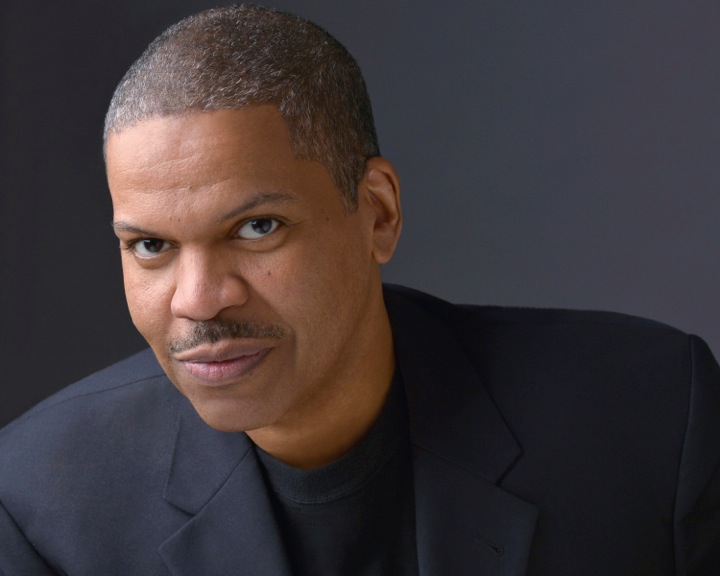
- Born: Leon Summers, Jr. 1958 (age 67–68); Nashville, Tennessee
- Education: Tennessee State University (BA); New York University – Tisch (MFA)
- Occupations: Performer, Librettist, Composer and producer
- Known for: Off-Broadway musical From My Hometown

Lee Summers (born 1958 in Nashville, Tennessee) is an American actor, singer, librettist, composer, director and theatre producer. He is also an acting teacher at New York University. He is known for creating and producing Off-Broadway's From My Hometown. As a director, Summers is a two-time winner of both the 2022 and 2018 Audelco Awards for 'Best Director of a Musical' for "Ella, First Lady of Song" and for "On Kentucky Avenue," respectively. As an actor, Summers made his Broadway debut in the original production of Dreamgirls. His one-person show Winds of Change garnered him the 2010 "Best Entertainer" Bistro Award. In 2018 he was nominated for an Audelco Award for 'Best Featured Actor in a Musical,' for "On Kentucky Avenue." Summers has appeared in numerous TV/Film roles, such as Core FOI (Fruit of Islam) in Malcolm X starring Denzel Washington, a neurosurgeon on Law & Order; a turn-of-the-century cook on Boardwalk Empire, and as a Police Sergeant, opposite Tom Selleck on Blue Bloods.

== Early life and career ==
Born in Nashville, Tennessee, Summers' first professional job was performing on the Showboat at Opryland USA while enrolled at Tennessee State University. An opportunity to tour singing the role of "Porgy" in Gershwin's Porgy and Bess prompted Summers to leave TSU during his senior year. After the tour, Summers moved to New York (1980) where, on his first night in Manhattan, he'd meet choreographer Michael Peters (Dreamgirls, Beat It), which led to his is Broadway debut. Years later, Summers reprised the role he played in the Original Dreamgirls for the Dreamgirls 20th Anniversary Benefit Concert with Lillias White, Billy Porter, Audra McDonald, Norm Lewis and Heather Headley. Later, at the invitation of Broadway vocal arranger Chapman Roberts (Five Guys Named Moe), Summers performed at Carnegie Hall.

In 1986, after a brief stint performing in Monte Carlo with Jenifer Lewis, Summers returned to Indiana to develop a one-man show, where when traveling one night he suffered a near-fatal car accident. On his journey to a full recovery, his voice as a stage writer emerged, leading to his creating and performing in what would become the Off-Broadway hit From My Hometown.

Writing led to Summers joining the Dramatists Guild of America, and his work or incarnations thereof, have been produced and presented On and Off-Broadway, at numerous regional theatres such as the Milwaukee Repertory, where Summers collaborated with Kevin Ramsey to premiere their original tap-dance musical, If These Shoes Could Talk, – now re-titled, "I Remember Harlem," starring tap dancer Harold Nicholas, of the legendary Nicholas Brothers, in his farewell stage performance. For this work, Summers and Ramsey were the first recipients of The New Professional Theatre Award – an award later bestowed upon such notables as Michael R. Jackson, Katori Hall and Colman Domingo.

Other venues and regional theatres where Summers' works have been produced include The Arkansas Repertory Theatre, The Ensemble Theatre, Karamu Theatre, The Phoenix Theatre, The Meadow Brook Theatre, The Madison Theatre at Molloy College, Theaterworks in Palo Alto, California, The Triad Theatre, New World Stages, AMAS Musical Theatre, Crossroads Theatre, RACCA's Seaport Salon, The Kirk Theatre, Gramercy Theatre, Radio City Music Hall's workshop spaces, The Kennedy Center and many others.

Other notable projects in development include Summers as librettist, co-lyricist and co-composer with Timothy Graphenreed, for Yo' Alice (Adaptation of Alice in Wonderland) which was conceived by Maurice Hines. Summers also collaborated with Hines on, Ella, First Lady of Song for which Summers currently serves as book writer/director. Ella, First Lady of Song premiered at New Jersey's Crossroads Theatre in 2004 starring Freda Payne (Band of Gold), again produced in 2014 by MetroStage in Alexandria, Virginia, followed by a production at the Delaware Theatre Company in 2018. In 2022, the musical was produced by the Madison Theatre at Molloy College garnering six AUDELCO nominations, winning five, including "Best Musical." In 2023, Crossroads Theatre celebrated 20 years of Ella, First Lady of Song productions in "A Musical Tribute to Ella Fitzgerald Starring Freda Payne." The event was written and directed by Lee Summers. Crossroads founding producer, Ricardo Khan and board member Emeritus, Richard Nurse credited Hines and Summers' Ella, First Lady of Song as the musical that garnered the revenue to reopen the then closed Crossroads Theatre, which, after winning the 1999 Tony Award for "Best Regional Theatre," had closed its doors by 2003.

Summers' funk musical, The Funkentine Rapture, was selected for the 2005 National Alliance for Musical Theatre Festival (NAMT) starring Tony Award Winner Billy Porter and presented in workshop at Theatreworks (Silicon Valley), directed by Robert Kelly. The Funkentine Rapture was presented in concert at 54 Below in June 2017, starring Tony Award Winners, James Monroe Iglehart and Lillias White.

Summers made his producing debut in 2003—partnering with Amas Musical theatre and Ben Blake for the developmental production of From My Hometown. The production transferred commercially to the Gramercy Theatre in 2004 with Summers as Lead Producer.

As a director, Summers, also 2022's winner for BroadwayWorld's "Best Director of a Musical" for Hawaii Performing Arts Festival's production of Hair: The Tribal Love-Rock Musical has directed works in venues ranging from New York's Urban Stages, AMAS Musical Theatre, The John Houseman Theatre, New World Stages, The Triad Theatre, Flushing Town Hall, The Milwaukee Repertory Theater, The Cell Theatre, Harlem Repertory Theatre, The Pearl Theatre Company to name a few. Summers directed the World Premiere of Acappella The Musical for the New York Musical Theatre Festival (NYMF) garnering three "Excellence Awards" in 2015.

Summers studied theatre at Tennessee State University and earned his Bachelor of Arts in Theatre and Dramatic Writing from SUNY Empire State College. He has an MFA in musical theatre writing from New York University/Tisch School of the Arts and has served as an adjunct professor at New York University Steinhardt School of Culture, Education, and Human Development's department of Music and Performing Arts Professions since 2020.

== Work ==
=== Stage Director (Recent) ===
- 2023 Ella, First Lady of Song (Director)
- 2022 Hair: The American Tribal Love-Rock Musical (Director)
- 2022 Ella, First Lady of Song (Director)
- 2018 On Kentucky Avenue (Director)

=== Librettist ===
- 1993 If These Shoes Could Talk(Co-librettist)
- 1998 'From My Hometown (Conceiver) (Co-librettist)
- 1999 Yo Alice(Librettist)
- 2004 Ella Fitzgerald: First Lady of Song(Librettist)
- 2005 The Funkentine Rapture(Co-librettist)
- 2013 The System (Librettist)
- 2014 Ella Fitzgerald: First Lady of Song(Librettist)
- 2018 Pangaea The Musical (Librettist)
- 2018 Ella Fitzgerald: First Lady of Song (Librettist)
- 2022 Ella Fitzgerald (Librettist)

=== Lyricist ===
- 1993 If These Shoes Could Talk (Co-lyricist)
- 1998 From My Hometown (Conceiver) (Co-lyricist) (Lyricist)
- 1999 Yo Alice(Co-lyricist)
- 2005 The Funkentine Rapture (Lyricist)
- 2010 Winds of Change (Co-lyricist) (Lyricist)
- 2013 The System(Co-lyricist) (Lyricist)
- 2016 Bayard The Musical (Lyricist)
- 2018 Pangaea The Musical (Lyricist)

=== Composer ===
- 1993 If These Shoes Could Talk(Co-Composer)
- 1998 From My Hometown (Conceiver) (Co-Composer)
- 1999 Yo Alice (Co-Composer)
- 2005 The Funkentine Rapture (Composer)
- 2010 Winds of Change (Composer)
- 2013 The System(Composer)
- 2016 Bayard The Musical (Composer)

=== Playwright ===
- 2016 Poetics Justice(Author) (Published)
- 2013 One Shot Deal(Author) (Published)

=== Producer ===
- 2003 From My Hometown (Kirk Theatre, New York City)
- 2004 From My Hometown (Gramercy Theatre, New York City
- 2010 Winds of Change (Triad Theatre)

=== Television and film actor ===
- 1992 Malcolm X ...Elijah Muhammad's FOI
- 1994 Law and Order (TV Series)- Coma (1994) ... Dr. David Monroe
- 1996 Law and Order (TV Series)- Causa Mortis (1996) ... Belmont Uniform Policeman
- 1997 New York Undercover (TV Series)- Fade Out (1997) ... Walter Stokes
- 2003 The presidents (PBS VIdeo)Colin Powell / Secret Service Man
- 2011 Boardwalk Empire (TV Series) – Battle of the Century (2011) ... Otis
- 2013 Blue Bloods (TV Series) – The City That Never Sleeps (2013) ... Sgt. Stiles

=== Stage actor and singer ===
- 1981 Dreamgirls (Original Broadway Production)
- 2001 Dreamgirls 20th Anniversary(Broadway Event)
- 2001 Little Ham(Off-Broadway)
- 2010 Winds of Change(Cabaret – Bistro Award Winner)

== Awards and competitions ==
Summers' works have received critical acclaim along with such honors as The New Professional Theatre's "Our Voices Award" (1996) eight AUDELCO Award nominations including "Best Musical" (2003), selection and presentation in the National Alliance for Musical Theatre's Festival of New Musicals(2005), TheatreWorks in Palo Alto, California (2005), a developmental workshop at Radio City Musical Hall (1999), developmental support from the Shubert Organization (2003), a Gilman & Gonzalez-Falla Theatre Foundation Commendation for his body of work in American Musical Theater (2003), New York's Bistro Award(2010) and four Michigan 2012 Wilde Award nominations and a recent win for Best Ensemble (2012).

2010 Bistro Award winner 'Outstanding Achievement, Entertainer'

2018 Audelco Award Nomination and Winner for 'Best Director of a Musical,' for "On Kentucky Avenue"

2018 Audelco Award Nomination for 'Best Featured Actor in a Musical,' for "On Kentucky Avenue"

2022 Audelco Award Nomination and Winner for 'Best Director of a Musical,' for "Ella, First Lady of Song"

2022 Broadway World Award Nomination and Winner for 'Best Director of a Musical,' for "Hair"
