= Meg Kissinger =

American investigative reporter

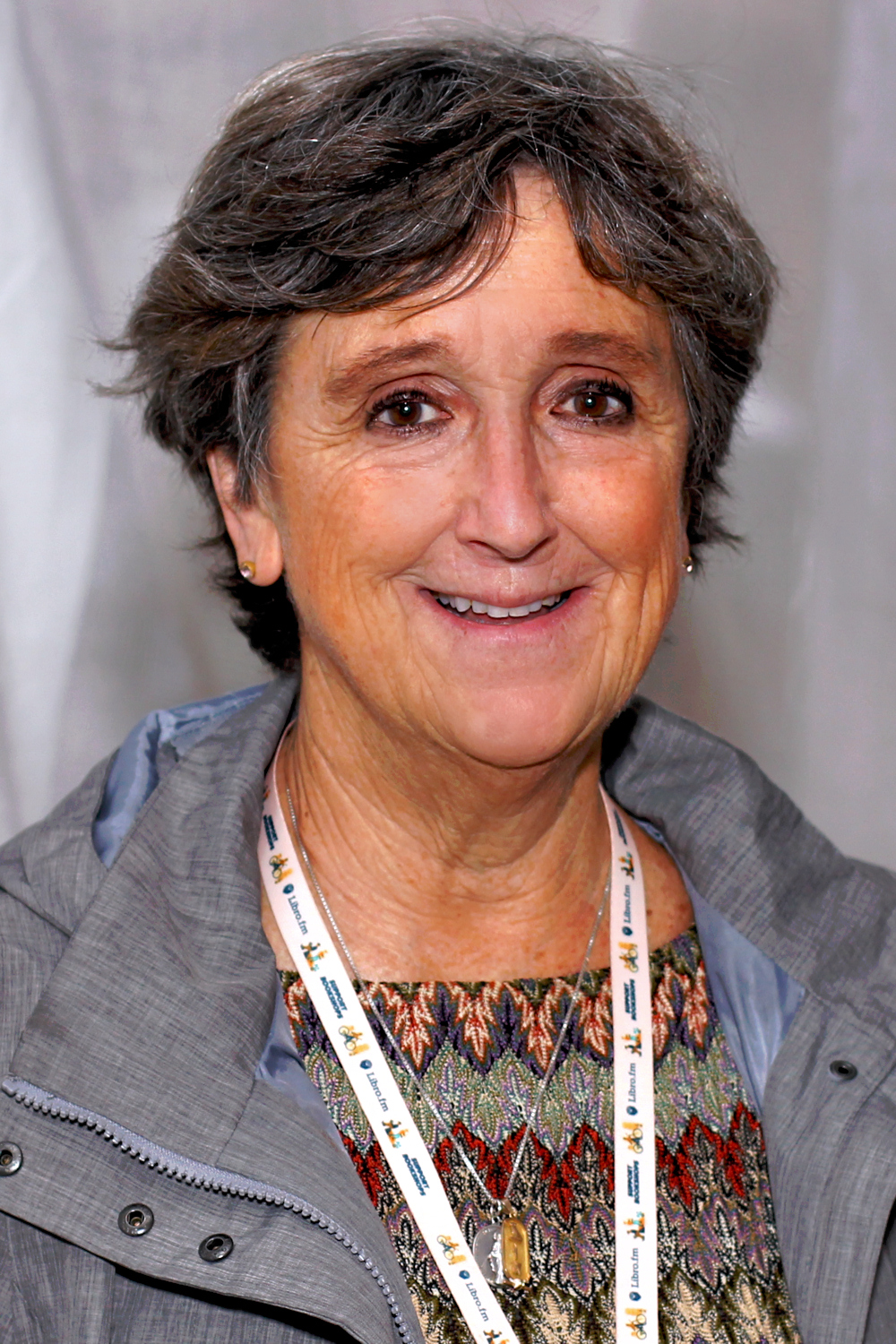
- Kissinger at the 2023 Texas Book Festival
- Born: Wilmette, Illinois, U.S.
- Education: DePauw University
- Occupation: Investigative journalist

Meg Kissinger is an American investigative journalist and a visiting professor at Columbia University.

== Biography ==
She is the author of “While You Were Out: An Intimate Family Portrait of Mental Illness in an Era of Silence”, published by Macmillan on Sept. 5, 2023. The book was named as one of the best memoirs of 2023 by Amazon, Audible and Goodreads and was chosen as the editors' choice by the New York Times and the Los Angeles Times. The Atlantic said it was one of six books that can "change the way you think about mental illness." While working at The Milwaukee Journal Sentinel, she and Susanne Rust were finalists for the 2009 Pulitzer Prize for Investigative Reporting for their investigation of Bisphenol A. Kissinger has also written extensively about the failures of the mental health system.

She was born in Wilmette, Illinois, the fourth oldest in a family of eight children. She attended St. Francis Xavier Grade School and Regina Dominican High School. She graduated from DePauw University in 1979.

== Awards ==
- 2013 George Polk Award for Medical Writing
- 2012 Robert F. Kennedy Journalism Award
- 2009 Pulitzer Prize for Investigative Reporting finalist
- 2008 George Polk Award
- 2008 John B. Oakes Award for distinguished environmental reporting
- Scripps Howard National Journalism award, 2009 and 2010
- 2009 Grantham award of special merit

== Work ==
- "Chemical Fallout", Milwaukee Wisconsin Journal Sentinel
