= Mathilde Pincus =

American music supervisor

- Born: 1917; Philadelphia, Pennsylvania, U.S.
- Died: March 5, 1988 (aged 70–71); Dania, Florida, U.S.
- Occupation: Music supervisor

Mathilde Pincus (1917 – March 5, 1988) was an American music supervisor. She was raised in Philadelphia, Pennsylvania. Pincus was honored with the Special Tony Award at the 30th Tony Awards. She died in March 1988 in Dania, Florida, at the age of 71.
