= Paul Carafotes =

American actor

- Born: March 23, 1959
- Occupation: American Actor

Paul Carafotes (born March 23, 1959) is an American actor, known for playing Harold Dyer in the prime-time television drama Knots Landing. He has starred in films, television, commercials, and on stage.

== Early life ==
Carafotes was born into an American Greek family and raised in Somerville, Massachusetts. He graduated from Somerville High School.

== Career ==
Carafotes began his professional career at the age of 20 in the 20th Century Fox film Headin' for Broadway. In it, he portrayed Ralph Morelli, a talented and soulful street kid from Philadelphia in a performance that Variety called "amazing." He followed that performance with another starring role as a partially deaf football player in the drama "Choices" in which Demi Moore debuted on the screen as his girlfriend. He then appeared in the film All the Right Moves as Vinnie Salvucci, teammate and friend of Stef Djordjevic, played by Tom Cruise.

Carafotes won an L.A. Drama Critics Award for writing the play "Beyond the Ring", in which he also starred and was nominated for best actor. He has won multiple awards including the audience award at the Beverly Hills Film Festival for writing, producing and directing the supernatural fantasy short film, "Club Soda". In 2006, Carafotes wrote, directed and produced the short film, Club Soda, edited into Stories USA. In 2010, Carafotes returned to acting in the Emmy award-winning series Damages.

Carafotes, inspired after the birth of his son Charlie, began writing a series of children's books entitled, "The Adventures of Charlie Bubbles!" The series includes a coloring book and CD of songs that complement the storybooks.

== Film credits ==
- Headin' for Broadway (1980) as Ralph Morelli
- Choices (1981) as John Carluccio
- All the Right Moves (1983) as Vinnie Salvucci
- Clan of the Cave Bear (1986) as Brug
- The Ladies Club (1986) as Eddie
- Blind Date (1987) as Disco Dancer
- Journey to the Center of the Earth (1989) as Richard
- Italian Movie (1993) as Phillipo
- Fight Club (1999) as Salvador the bartender
- Scriptfellas (1999) as Barry Goldberg
- Lonely Hearts (2006) as Detective Paco
- Club Soda (2006) director, writer, producer
- American Breakdown (2008) director
- @urFRENZ (2010) as Terry
- Mind Hunter (2019) as Rod

== Personal life ==
In 2019, Carafotes alleged that he was the mystery man that Demi Moore slept with the night before her marriage to Freddy Moore in 1981, as detailed in her memoir Inside Out. Carafotes claimed that the two met during an audition for the 1981 film Choices and the two carried on a month long affair.
