= Headin' for Broadway =

- Theatrical release poster
- Directed by: Joseph Brooks
- Written by: Joseph Brooks; Larry Gross; Hilary Henkin
- Produced by: Joseph Brooks
- Starring: Rex Smith; Terri Treas; Vivian Reed; Paul Carafotes; Gary Gendell; Benjamin Rayson
- Cinematography: Eric Saarinen
- Edited by: John Mullen
- Music by: Joseph Brooks
- Production company: 20th Century Fox
- Distributed by: 20th Century Fox
- Release date: May 1, 1980
- Running time: 90 minutes
- Country: United States
- Language: English
- Budget: $5.3 million

Headin' for Broadway is a 1980 American drama film directed by Joseph Brooks and written by Joseph Brooks, Larry Gross, and Hilary Henkin. The film stars Rex Smith, Terri Treas, Vivian Reed, Paul Carafotes, Gary Gendell and Benjamin Rayson. The film was released in May 1980, by 20th Century Fox.

== Plot ==
Four young hopefuls from different parts of the country head to Broadway for a shot at stardom. They include Fast Eddie, a Los Angeles singer and composer; Carrie a farm girl from Ohio; Valerie, a talented but poor church singer and waitress from Harlem; and Ralphy, a cocky kid from Philadelphia.

== Cast ==
- Rex Smith as Fast Eddie
- Terri Treas as Carrie Richards
- Vivian Reed as Valerie Walker
- Paul Carafotes as Ralph Morelli
- Gary Gendell as Gary
- Benjamin Rayson as Singing Coach
- Dick Boccelli as Mr. Morelli
- Anthony Cafiso as Brother
- Vera Lockwood as Mrs. Morelli
- Mario Mariani as Vic
- Lisa Goodman as Gloria
- Herman O. Arbeit as Desk Clerk
- Charles Brown as Pimp
- Gene Foote as Jay Weston
- Ed Morgan as Ed Reeves
- Lonny Price as Steven Levy
- Reza Sefavi as Equity Rep1
- Carol Hamilton as Mitzi Jackson
- Larry Hochman as Rehearsal Pianist
- Tracy Fitzpatrick as Lucy Richards
- James Congdon as Mr. Richards
- Lenka Peterson as Mrs. Richards
- Michael Conforti as Jimmy
- Jean Foster as Kitty Walker
- Eliza DeCroes as Carla

== Critical reception ==
Leonard Maltin dismissed the film as "astonishingly amateurish" and stated that it "looks like a film they tried to save in the editing room; it didn't work." John Elliot was equally dismissive in his review, stating that it was "An inconsequential film that should be retitled Heading Nowhere." CineMag critic J. Paul Costabile praised Gene Foote's portrayal of the choreographer but otherwise felt that the cast's talents were hampered by poor material. The Boston Globe critic Michael Blowen stated, "Every moment tastes like a cream puff washed down with a pint of undiluted maple syrup. Brooks never ventures into the psychological underpinnings of his ambitious quartet or lets his camera gaze on the sleazier side of Broadway." Noel Taylor in The Ottawa Citizen similarly dismissed the film as "imitation syrup", but praised Vivian Reed's performance as "riveting" and the only one to "survive the Brooks treatment".
