= Regina Dominican High School =

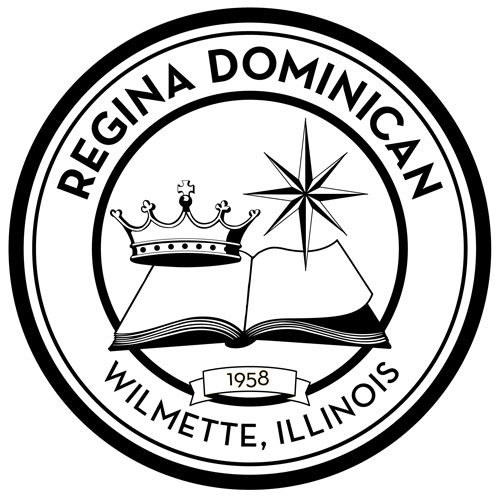

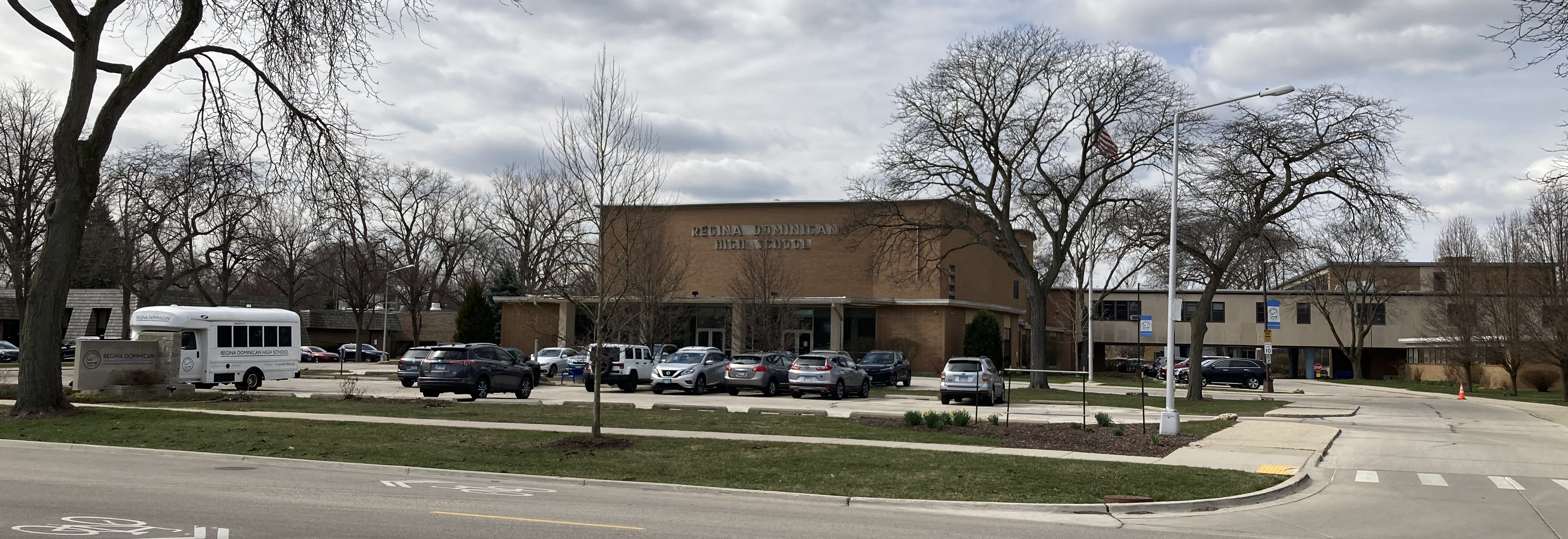

Location
- 701 Locust Road; Wilmette, Illinois 60091; United States; 42°4′30″N 87°44′35″W

Information
- Type: private
- Motto: Caritas & Veritas
- Denomination: Roman Catholic
- Established: September 1958
- Founder: Adrian Dominican Sisters
- Oversight: Dominican Veritas Ministries
- President: Krista Gallagher
- Principal: Kathleen Porreca Ph.D.
- Staff: 21
- Faculty: 27
- Grades: 9–12
- Gender: all-female
- Enrollment: 215
- Average class size: 13
- Student to teacher ratio: 8:1
- Campus type: suburban
- Colors: Black, White, and Carolina blue
- Athletics conference: Independent School League
- Mascot: Gina the Panther
- Team name: Panthers
- Accreditation: North Central Association of Colleges and Schools
- Newspaper: Crown
- Yearbook: The Star
- Tuition: 21,800
- Affiliation: Adrian Dominican Sisters Dominican Veritas Ministries
- Nobel laureates: Carol Ross Barney Sister Donna Markham, PhD, OP Sister Nancy Murray
- Website: http://www.rdpanthers.org

Regina Dominican is a college preparatory Catholic school for girls grades 9-12, located in Wilmette, Illinois.

== History ==
Regina Dominican High School is an all-girls, Catholic, college-preparatory high school in Wilmette, Illinois, welcoming students of all faiths from Chicago’s North Shore, the north suburbs and the City of Chicago. Founded in 1958 by the Adrian Dominican Sisters, the school services students in grades nine through twelve and is affiliated with the Dominican educational tradition and the foundation of “Joyful Preachers”.

Regina Dominican offers a college-preparatory curriculum and emphasizes academic excellence through leadership development, service, Advanced Placement coursework and pursuit for higher education.

Regina Dominican was ranked first among all-girls high schools in Cook County, according to Niche’s 2027 Best Schools rankings. The school was also ranked second among all-girls high schools in Illinois, and fourth among Catholic high schools in Illinois.

== Accreditation and awards ==
Regina Dominican is a member of the Dominican Association of Secondary Schools and the National Association for College Admission Counseling (NACAC). The school subscribes to the NACAC Statement of Principles of Good Practice, and is accredited by AdvancED and the Illinois State Board of Education. Eighty-four percent of Regina Dominican’s faculty have earned advanced degrees, or are in the process. As of 2026, the student-to-faculty ratio was 8:1.

In 2012, Regina was recognized with an Edison Award Silver Medal in the category of living, working, and learning environments for its approach to education that prepares young women for global leadership. Regina Dominican has been recognized by the United States Department of Education as a Blue Ribbon School of Excellence in 2025, and is listed among the top 2% of the nation's schools. Niche ranks Regina as the 2nd best all-girls high school in Illinois and the #1 All-Girls School in Cook County.

In 2025, Regina Dominican was recognized as a 2025 Illinois Governor’s Blue Ribbon School, one of 28 schools statewide to receive this honor for exemplary academic performance.

In 2025, College Board announced that Regina Dominican High School has been named to the 2025 Advanced Placement® Program (AP®) School Honor Roll, earning Platinum distinction for the third year in a row.

== Academics ==
The school offers a rigorous STEAM and liberal arts education, including the arts, as well as courses in theology. Incoming students must pass the High School Proficiency Assessment exam.

Regina Dominican's Class of 2026 was accepted to over 139 colleges and universities across the country and was offered $16.5 million in scholarships. More than 60% of graduating seniors from the Class of 2026 have declared a major in the STEM field.

== Extracurricular activities ==
=== Athletics ===
Regina Dominican has one of the largest all-girls athletic programs in the state. The school offers 11 competitive sports, and student athletes are part of the Independent School League (ISL) and IHSA Conference. Interscholastic sport teams include cheerleading, cross country running, golf, flag football, tennis, volleyball, basketball, bowling, lacrosse, soccer, softball, and track and field.

The 2023-2024 Varsity Basketball team competed in the IHSA Final Four, earning fourth place. This is the teams first appearance down state in over 20 years and a young team at that, only losing two seniors.

Fine Arts

Regina Dominican a strong Fine Arts department. Offering courses such as Dance Foundations, Advanced Dance, AP Music Theory, Ceramics, Immersive Art History, Studio Art and more. The school puts on two-stage productions a year and a Dance & Art Showcase in the Spring. More than 1/3 of students participate in at least one fine arts production.

== Notable alumnae ==
- Patty Carroll, photographer
- Meg Kissinger, investigative journalist
- Marcia Cebulska, writer
