= Marcia Cebulska =

American writer

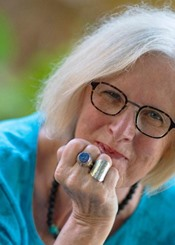
- Marcia Cebulska - portrait by Ann Palmer
- Occupation: Writer

Marcia Cebulska (born July 21, 1944) is an American novelist, playwright, and screenwriter. She lives in Topeka, Kansas. Her notable literary work includes the plays Florida, and Dear John as well as her novel, Watching Men Dance. Cebulska’s writing has often reflected issues such as women’s rights, gay rights, race relations, domestic violence, and homelessness.

== Biography ==
Marcia Cebulska spent her early years living behind her parents’ bakery in a Chicago working-class Polish neighborhood called Belmont Cragin. Her family moved to the suburb of Niles, Illinois during her teen years. She graduated from Regina Dominican High School, Wilmette, Illinois.

The first in her family to graduate from college, Cebulska attended the University of Miami in Florida, Universidad de las Americas in Mexico City, then graduated from Barnard College in 1967 at Columbia University with a degree in Philosophy. She later did graduate work at Columbia University School of the Arts in creative writing and at the Folklore Institute at Indiana University. During her Barnard years and for some time thereafter, she worked as a research assistant at Bureau of Applied Social Research, Columbia University, on the Homelessness Project (1966–70). Later, she was employed as an outside contractor to the New York City Department of City Planning. She also worked part-time as a gallery girl at Oscar Krasner's Krasner Gallery on Madison Avenue. In 1971, she worked for sociologist Howard M. Bahr on his study of skid row and race in Seattle. She then continued her graduate education at the Folklore Institute at Indiana University.

Cebulska is a member of the Dramatists Guild of America and is a Fellow of the Center for Kansas Studies.

== Bibliography ==
- Cebulska, Marcia (2019). Skywriting. Flinthills Publishing. ISBN 9780999754795.
- Cebulska, Marcia (2020). Watching Men Dance. Flinthills Publishing. ISBN 9781733203562.
- Cebulska, Marcia (2023). Lovers, Dreamers, and Thieves: My people, Chicago, & the Polish bakery where I grew up. Flinthills Publishing. Hardback: ISBN 9781953583475. Paperback: ISBN 9781953583482.

== Plays ==
Dear John, an epistolary play about a deep friendship and love relationship between a woman and a gay man, was the first of Marcia Cebulska’s plays to receive national attention. The one-act version won the Broad Ripple Playhouse play writing competition. Their production was directed by Bryan Fonseca with whom Ms. Cebulska worked frequently over the next decade, particularly at the Phoenix Theatre (Indianapolis). The play was developed at the Playwrights Center of San Francisco and was the 1983 winner of the International Gay Playwriting contest sponsored by the Gay Theatre Alliance and consequently performed at the Meridian Gay Theatre and the Playwork Festival at the Open Gate Theatre, both in New York. The play has been performed at many venues since, including a Zoom performance in 2020, directed by Cebulska’s frequent collaborator, Martha Jacobs.

Florida, was developed at the Eugene O’Neill National Playwrights Conference where it was directed by Oz Scott. The play premiered at Georgia Repertory Theatre concurrent with Cebulska’s residency at The University of Georgia. Florida was the winner of the 1996 FEAT competition which resulted in a production at the Phoenix Theatre (Indianapolis). Scenes from the play are excerpted in Martha Jacob’s book, A Meisner Legacy. Marion Garmel's review of Florida says that it is "a powerful portrait of a family falling apart."

Visions of Right, was written in response to the anti-gay, anti-Jewish, anti-arts ministry of Pastor Fred W. Phelps Sr.'s Westboro Baptist Church, located in Topeka, Kansas, the same city where the writer resides. To research her writing, Cebulska attended the church undercover. The play was developed at Chicago Dramatists and received the Dorothy Silver Award as the best play of the year featuring a Jewish character.

Now Let Me Fly was commissioned by the Brown Foundation for the national celebration of the 50th anniversary (2004) of the Brown v. Board of Education Supreme Court decision. The premiere performance, directed by Kevin Willmott, occurred on May 17, 2004. There were concurrent performances at the National Constitution Center, the Rothko Chapel, and numerous NAACP chapters, schools, and churches. At the request of public-school teachers, Cebulska wrote two youth versions of the play which she made available, royalty-free, through a website provided by Washburn University School of Law.

Touched: The Last 2,000 Heartbeats of William Inge, was commissioned by the William Inge Theatre Festival for their 25th anniversary. The premiere performance at the festival was directed by the artistic director, Peter Ellenstein. The play follows the last 2,000 heartbeats of William Inge as he looks back on his life during his suicide.

Rooted, was written for the 5th anniversary of the tornado that destroyed 97% of the town Greensburg, Kansas which was then reconstructed as an ecologically sound green city. The project was underwritten by a grant from the National Endowment for the Arts and included the participation of the William Inge Center for the Arts, the Greensburg Art Center, and the Cornerstone Theater Company of Los Angeles. Laurie Woolery directed with original music by Kelley Hunt. Following the Cornerstone Theater Company’s model, the play tells the community story as an adaptation of the Odyssey.

And When The Bough Breaks deals with the issue of surrogacy.
