= Susanne Rust =

American investigative journalist

Susanne Rust (born in Briarcliff Manor, New York) is an American investigative journalist.

== Biography ==
She graduated from Barnard College with a bachelor's degree, from University of Wisconsin–Madison, with an MS in 1999. In 2003, she started as a science reporter at the Milwaukee Journal Sentinel. She with Meg Kissinger investigated Bisphenol A. She was a John S. Knight Fellow at Stanford University.

Rust currently works at Columbia University's Graduate School of Journalism, where she directs the Energy and Environment Reporting Project. She was an environmental reporter at California Watch, a project of the Center for Investigative Reporting until 2014.

== Awards ==
- 2009 Pulitzer Prize for Investigative Reporting finalist
- 2008 George Polk Award
- 2008 John B. Oakes award for distinguished environmental reporting
- Scripps Howard National Journalism award
- 2009 Grantham award of special merit

== Bibliography ==
- Rust, Susanne; Cary Spivak; Meg Kissinger (Nov 25, 2007). "Are your products safe? You can't tell". Journal-Sentinel. Milwaukee.
- Rust, Susanne; Cary Spivak; Meg Kissinger (Dec 2, 2007). "Bisphenol A is in you". Journal-Sentinel. Milwaukee.
- Rust, Susanne (Sep 2013). "See a fish think". The Crux. Discover. 34 (7): 16.
