= Stories USA =

- Movie Poster
- Directed by: David Brooks; Paul Carafotes; Tyrone Finch; Jeremy Hall; Gary Hawes; Erik MacArthur; M. Eastling
- Produced by: Thomas Bannister
- Starring: Scott Caan; Steve Carell; James Gandolfini; Ioan Gruffudd; Josh Hartnett; Paris Hilton; Paul Walker
- Distributed by: America Video Films
- Release date: October 17, 2012
- Running time: 90 minutes
- Country: United States
- Language: English

Stories USA (released on DVD as American Breakdown) compiles six cinematic stories about desperate lives in America, starring many of the world's top actors including Josh Hartnett, Steve Carell, James Gandolfini, Scott Caan, Paul Walker and directed by seven different directors including Paul Carafotes.

This collection was sold at the 2007 American Film Market, and was released on DVD and Blu-Ray October 17, 2012. Stories USA was executive produced by Thomas Bannister.

== Segments ==
Member

Directed by David Brooks - Starring Josh Hartnett

A 19-year-old boy is driving around Los Angeles. He is looking for the perfect Mercedes, BMW, Lexus... Preferably a late model. A late model rolling through a stop sign, or breaking some other traffic law. In this kaleidoscopic road tour through nocturnal Los Angeles, he is looking for the perfect car to crash into and claim on the insurance.

Street of Pain

Directed by Tyrone Finch & Jeremy Hall - Starring Steve Carell

A man wants to take revenge for a terrible incident with dodgeballs, that happened when he was young.

Club Soda

Directed by Paul Carafotes - Starring James Gandolfini

When a kid steals money from a bar, he awakens the supernatural spirit of a man who causes him to re-evaluate his life and make some tough choices.

Life Makes Sense When You Are Famous

Directed by Erik MacArthur - Starring Scott Caan & Paul Walker

A car accident brings together a down on his luck man and a movie star.

The Little Things

Directed by Gary Hawes - Starring Ioan Gruffudd

After a suicide attempt, Claire has nothing better to do than go to work. During a cigarette break, she meets Simon, a man with a few issues of his own.

L.A. Knights

Directed by M. Eastling - Starring Paris Hilton

Dealing with the aftermath of a bad break up, Maximina prepares to spend a quiet night sulking at home, only to be ambushed by her friends and dragged out for a night of revelry. Join Max, Sadie and Louisa as they venture out to find a hot new distraction to cure a broken heart.

== Cast ==
- Scott Caan as Hayden Field
- Steve Carell as Mark Ronson
- James Gandolfini as The Man
- Josh Hartnett as Gianni
- Paul Walker as Mikey
- Ioan Gruffudd as Simon
- Paris Hilton as Sadie
- Laurie Fortier as Bunny
