= Amas Musical Theatre =

Amas Musical Theatre, also known as the Rosetta LeNoire Theatre Academy and the Mainstage Musical Theatre, and formerly known as the Amas Repertory Theatre, Inc. and the Eubie Blake Youth Theatre, is a non-profit Manhattan-based theatre organization founded by Rosetta LeNoire. The name stems from the Latin word "amare", meaning "to love". "Amas" is the active indicative present form of "you love". The Academy puts on both a showcase and an off-off-Broadway performance at the end of the year, featuring inner-city and other teenagers. Amas is an anchor theatre tenant of The Players Theatre, a theatre located in Greenwich Village. The theatre has produced over 60 original musicals, including Bubbling Brown Sugar and Bojangles!.

== History ==
The organization was founded in 1968 by Rosetta LeNoire as the Amas Repertory Theatre to promote interracial and color-blind casting. In her words, it was a place "where all people could work together, with respect for individual skills and talents, rather than for race or color." In 1997, a newspaper called the New York Beacon wrote that "Rosetta created non-traditional casting before the phrase itself was created." Amas' first production, Soul, Yesterday and Today, which was based on the poetry of Langston Hughes, held its rehearsals in the basement of LeNoire's home in the Bronx. In 1989, the name was changed to Amas Musical Theatre. In 1977, Amas moved to Fifth Avenue and 104th Street, then in 1992 to the West 42nd Street theatre district. The organization's youth program, now known as the Amas Musical Theatre Teen Academy, was known as the Eubie Blake Youth Theatre from the 1970s to 1980s, where training was offered to youths ages 10 to 18.

== Production history ==
Year(s)	Title	Director	Choreographer	Book by	Music by	Notes
1973–1976	Reminiscing with Sissie and Blake	Louis Johnson	Louis Johnson	Louis Johnson	Eubie Blake & Noble Sissle	
1973–1976	Bubbling Brown Sugar	Robert M. Cooper	Fred Benjamin	Loften Mitchell		Transferred to Broadway
1977	Come Laugh and Cry with Langston Hughes	Rosetta LeNoire	Eugene Little			Musical Revue
1977	Save the Seeds, Darling	Arthur Whitelaw		Helen Powers	William David Brohn	
1977	Bojangles!	Ira Cirker	Frank Hatchett	Norman Mitgang		
1977	Ragtime Blues	Jay Binder	Dennis Karr	Mitch Douglas	Scott Joplin	
1978	Boston, Boston	William M. Maher	William M. Maher	William M. Maher	William David Brohn	
1978	Adam, the Life of Adam Clayton Powell, Jr.			June Ahlert	Richard Ahlert	
1978	Beowulf	Voigt Kempson	Voigt Kempson	Betty Jane Rylie	Victor Davies	
1979	Suddenly the Music Starts		Henry Le Tang	Johnny Brandon	Johnny Brandon	
1979	It's So Nice to Be Civilized	Jeffrey Dunn	Fred Benjamin	Micki Grant	Micki Grant	
1979	Helen	Lucia Victor		Lucia Victor	Johnny Brandon	
1979	Sparrow in Flight, The Story of Ethel Waters	Dean Irby	Bernard Johnson	Charles Fuller		
1980	Mama, I Want to Sing!	Duane L. Jones		Vy Higginsen	Richard Tee	
1980	Jam, A Jazz Odyssey	William Mooney	Dennis J. Shearer	John Gerstad		
1980	Dunbar	Ron Stacker Thompson		Ayanna (adaptation)	Paul Tilman Smith & Quitman Flood, III	
1980	Before the Flood	Billie Allen	Mabel Robinson	Rudy Gray	David Blake	
1980	And Still I Rise	Maya Angelou		Maya Angelou	Lalo Schifrin	
1981	Will They Ever Love Us on Broadway?	Mable Robinson	Mable Robinson	Osayande Baruti	Osayande Baruti	
1981	Mo' Tea, Miss Ann?	Denny Shearer	Denny Shearer	Bebe Coker	Leander Morris	
1981	A Local Dilemma			Frederick MacKinnon	Fred Lederman	
1981	Langston Speaks	Bob Brooker				Based on the work of Langston Hughes
1981	The Crystal Tree	Billie Allen		Doris Julian	Luther Henderson	
1981	The Winds of Change	William M. Maher	Robin Reseen	Franklin Tramutola	Joseph D'Agostino	
1982	Louisiana Summer	Robert Stark	Eiko Yamaguchi	Robert & Bradley Wexler	Rocky Stone	
1982	Five Points	William M. Maher		Laurence Holder	John Braden	
1982	Opening Night	William M. Maher	Mabel Robinson	Corliss Taylor-Dunn & Sandra Reaves Phillips	Corliss Taylor-Dunn & Sandra Reaves Phillips	
1984	Miss Walters to You	Billie Allen		Loften Mitchell		
1984	The Buck Stops Here	Regge Life	Tim Mellett	Norman J. Fedder	Richard A. Lippmann	
1984	Sing Me Sunshine	Jack Timmers	Henry Le Tang	Robert E. Richardson & Johnny Brandon	Johnny Brandon	
1984	Blackberries	Andre DeShields	Andre DeShields	Joseph George Caruso		
1985	Anonymous	Vincenzo Stornaiuolo		Vincenzo Stornaiuolo	Vincenzo Stornaiuolo	
1985	Northern Boulevard	William Martin	Dennis Dennehy	Kevin Brofsky	Carleton Carpenter	
1985	Manhattan Serenade	Bob Rizzo	Bob Rizzo	Karen Kottrell & Alfred Heller	Louis Alter	
1986	Bingo!	Ossie Davis	Henry Le Tang	Ossie Davis & Hy Gilbert	George Fischoff	Based on The Bingo Long Traveling All-Stars and Motor Kings
1986	The Peanut Man: George Washington Carver	Regge Life	Andy Torres	Melvin Hasman	William Greg Hunter	
1986	La Belle Helene	John Fearley	J. Randall Hugill	John Fearley	Jacques Offenbach	Adapted from Helen
1986	Sh-Boom	Stuart Warmflash	Audrey Tischler	Eric V. Talt, Jr.	Willex Brown, Jr.	
1987	Hot Sake with a Pinch of Salt	Bill Martin	Audrey Tischler	Carol Baker & Lana Stein	Jerome I. Goldstein	Based on A Majority of One
1987	Dazy	Phillip Rose		Allen Knee	Lowell E. Mark	
1987	Prime Time	Marvin Gordon		R.A. Shiomi	Johnny Brandon	
1988	Conrack	Stuart Ross		Granville Burgess	Lee Pockriss	Based on The Water is Wide
1988	Struttin'	Lee Chamberlin		Lee Chamberlin	Lee Chamberlin	AUDELCO Award: Outstanding Musical Production
1988	Robin's Band	Anthony Abeson		Anthony Abeson & Jerry Eskow	Maija Kupris	
1989	Paris '31	John Fearley	Robert Longbottom	John Fearley	Cole Porter	
1989	Prizes	Lee Minskoff	Margo Sappington	Raffi Pehlivanian	Charles DeForest & Lee Minskoff	
1989	Blackamoor	Kent Paul		Joseph George Caruso	Ulpio Minucci	Based on I, Juan de Pareja
1990	Step into My World	Ronald G. Russo	Jeffrey Dobbs		Micki Grant	Musical revue based on the career of Micki Grant
1990	Capitol Cakewalk	Tom O'Horgan	Welsey Fata	Elmire Kline & Perry Arthur Koreger	Terry Waldo	NY Outer Critics Circle Award winner
1991	Juba	Sheldon Epps	Mercedes Ellington	Wendy Lamb	Russel Walden	Richard Rodgers Production Award winner; Mainstage production
1992	Junkyard	Avi Ber Hoffman		Manuel Mandel & Michael Sahl	Michael Sahl	Lab Presentation
1992	Gunmetal Blues	Davis Hall		Scott Wentworth	Craig Bohmler & Marion Adler	
1993	The River Flows	James L. Moody	Felicia Kennerly		Holly B. Francis & Andre Orlando Edwards	
1994	Legacy	James L. Moody	Felicia Kennerly		Holly B. Francis	
1995	Bobos	Luther Fontaine	Monica Johnson	Ed Shockley	James McBride	
1995	Time and the Wind	Louis Johnson		Norman Matlock	Galt MacDermot	World premiere
1995	I Have a Name	James L. Moody		Holly B. Francis	Holly B. Francis	
1996	Bring in the Morning	Christopher Scott	Monica Johnson		Gary William Friedman	
1996	Paul Robeson	Harold Scott			Phillip Hayes Dean	Broadway production in association with Eric Krebs
1997	Song by Song: The Music of Michael Valenti	Mark Waldrop			Michael Valenti	World premiere
1997	The Princess and the Black-Eyed Pea	Daniel Banks		Karole Foreman	Andrew M. Chukerman	Richard Rodgers Development Award winner
1997	Bobos	Daniel Banks	Monica Johnson	Ed Shockley	James McBride	Richard Rodgers Development Award for Playwriting winner
1998	Out of the Night and into the Light: Miss Havisham's Wedding Night	Nancy Rhodes		John Olon-Scrymgeour	Dominick Argento	
1998	Out of the Night and into the Light: Ocean Dream	Nancy Rhodes		Nancy Rhodes	Victor Kioulaphides	
1998	Out of the Night and into the Light: I Will Wait	Nancy Rhodes		Nancy Rhodes	Arif Mardin	
1998	Barrio Babies	Susanna Tubert		Luis Santeiro	Fernando Rivas	Richard Rodgers Development Award
1999	Rollin' on the T.O.B.A.	Ronald Stevens				Transferred to off-Broadway then to Broadway
2000	Four Guys Named Jose and Una Mujer Named Maria!	Lisa Portes	Maria Torres	Dolores Prida	David Coffman	
2000	Carefully Taught	Christopher Scott	Monica Johnson			Musical revue
2000	A Virtual Woman	Nancy Rhodes		Marsha Sheiness	Rick Cummins	
2000	The Me Nobody Knows	Christopher Scott	Monica Johnson	Will Holt	Gary William Friedman	
2000	Starmites	Barry Keating		Stuart Ross & Barry Keating	Barry Keating	
2001	Once on This Island	Christopher Scott	Monica Johnson	Lynn Ahrens	Stephen Flaherty	
2001	Little Ham	Eric Riley	Leslie Dockery	Dan Owen	Judd Woldin	Transferred to off-Broadway
2001	Stormy Weather: The Lena Horne Story	Billie Allen	Sharleen Cohen	Sharleen Cohen	Sharleen Cohen	
2002	From My Hometown	Kevin Ramsey	Leslie Dockery & Kevin Ramsey	Lee Summers, Ty Stephens and Herbert Rawlings, Jr.	Lee Summers	
2002	The Robber Bridegroom	Christopher Scott	Monica Johnson	Alfred Uhry	Robert Waldman	
2002	Latin Heat	Maria Torres	Maria Torres			
2002	Zanna, Don't!	Devanand Janki	Devanand Janki	Tim Acito	Tim Acito	Transferred to off-Broadway
2003	Godspell	Christopher Scott	Monica Johnson	John Michael-Tebelek	Stephen Schwartz	
2003	Mandela!	Ricardo Khan		Steven Fisher & Duma Ndlovu	Steven Fisher	
2003	Blackout	Deborah Hurwitz		Sharleen Cohen	Debra Barsha	
2004	Footloose	Christopher Scott	Monica Johnson		Tom Snow	
2004	Lone Star Love, or The Merry Wives of Windsor	Michael Bogdanov		John Haber	Jack Herrick	

== Theatre programs ==
In the past 10 years, Amas has worked with over 60 creative teams in the development of new musicals.

=== Six O'Clock Musical Theatre Lab ===
This is a development program for writers, lyricists, and composers to mount staged readings of new musicals. Each work generally receives three or four performances.

=== Workshop Program ===
This is a program which lets composers, lyricists, and librettists work on a more polished and complete version of a new work. The productions generally entail a two to three-week rehearsal period with a series of performances.

=== Mainstage Program ===
This is a program which gives select musicals a fully produced off-Broadway run for four to six weeks with attendance by critics. The productions generally run under an Equity Letter of Agreement contract.

== Educational programs ==
=== Rosetta LeNoire Musical Theatre Academy ===
This is a performance and training program which enrolls up to 30 teenagers and young adults between the ages of 14 and 21 in all-day classes and rehearsals on Saturdays and some Sundays from October through May. Sixty percent of students receive full or partial Scholarships. The program ends with a musical which runs for two weeks in an off-off-Broadway theatre.

=== Immigration Experience ===
This is an in-residence set of workshops for middle and high school students consisting of 32 visits specializing in playwriting, theatre, and musical composition. Students also research their families' and communities' immigration histories which are turned into writings and songs performed in front of their school and extended community.

=== Broadway Babies ===
This is an in-residence program which runs from 4 to 12 weeks for younger children. Students make a mini-version of a Broadway show which relates to themes or curriculum being studied in their class.

=== Our America: The Civil Rights Movement through Song and Story ===
This is an in-residence program which explores the Civil Rights Movement, Dr. Martin Luther King Jr., and Protest and Peace Songs, among other things. Eventually, there is a presentation.

=== Passport Around the World ===
This is an in-residence program with 18 artist visits based on the social studies curriculum of the classroom. Students create their own US Passport which includes a picture and stamped with flags which they will "visit"/study. The program concludes with a final presentation of the pieces studied.

=== Urban Mythography: Journey of the Hero ===
This is a program for elementary and middle school students to study Native American, Asian, classical Western and European mythologies and heroic icons. The class creates a piece to be rehearsed and presented to their school.

== Awards ==
- Mayor's Award of Honor for Art and Culture
- Manhattan Borough's President Award – Excellence in Theatre
- Audience Development Committee (AUDELCO) Award – 1979, 1982, 1984, 1986
- National Medal of Arts (given to LeNoire) – 1999
