= Gramercy Theatre =

Music venue in Manhattan, New York

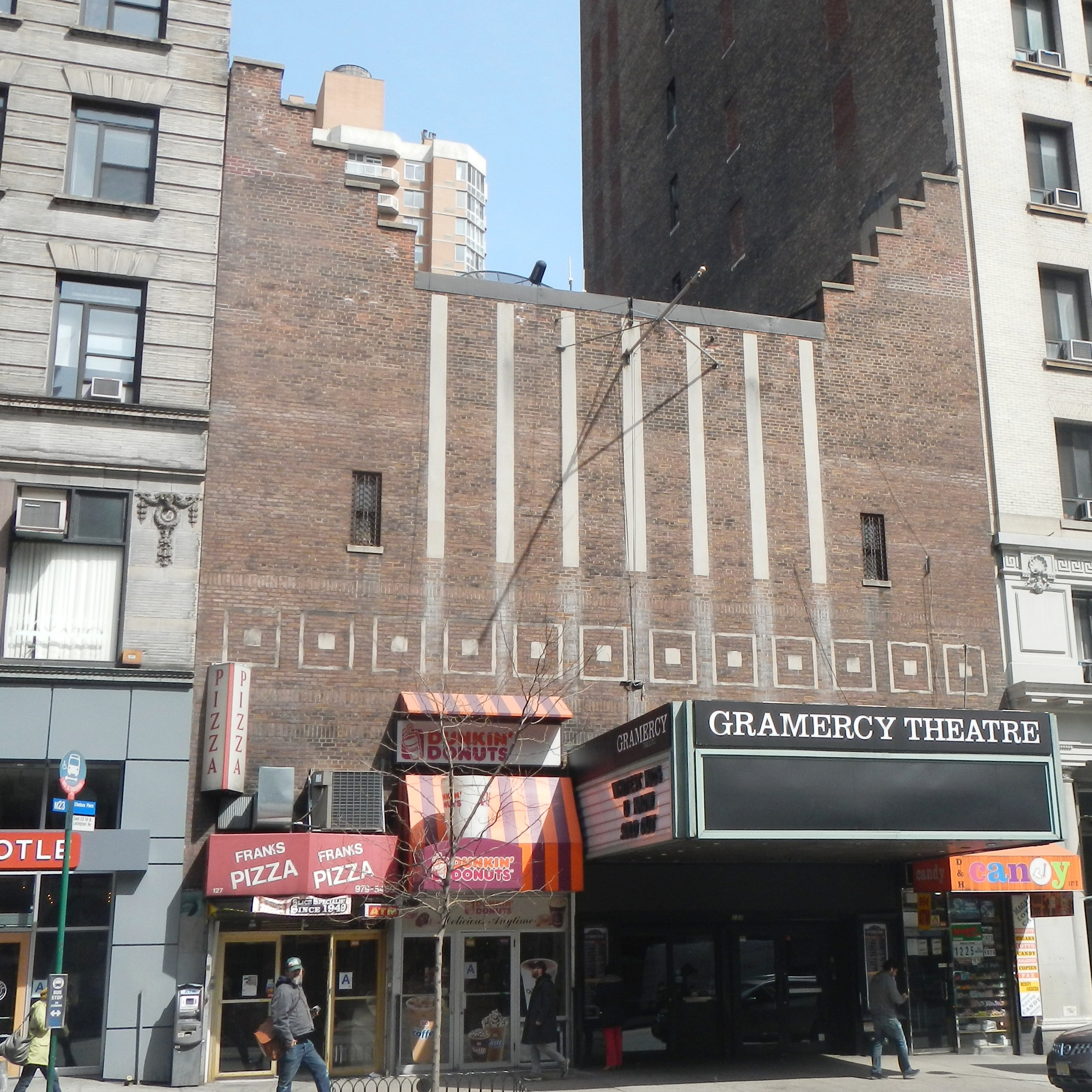
- Interactive map of Gramercy Theatre
- Former names: Gramercy Park Theatre Blender Theatre
- Address: 127 E. 23rd St.
- Location: New York City
- Coordinates: 40.739753°N 73.985001°W
- Owner: Live Nation Entertainment
- Capacity: 650
- Type: Theatre

Construction
- Built: 1937

Website
- www.thegramercytheatre.com

The Gramercy Theatre is a music venue in New York City. It is located in the Gramercy neighborhood of Manhattan, on 127 East 23rd Street. Built in 1937 as the Gramercy Park Theatre, it is owned and operated by Live Nation as one of their two concert halls in New York City, the other being the nearby Irving Plaza.

== History ==
Built in 1937 and designed by architect Charles A. Sandblom in the Streamline Moderne style, the theater is located at 127 E. 23rd St in the historic Gramercy neighborhood. It was originally known as the Gramercy Park Theatre to avoid confusion with the existing Gramercy Theatre at 310 First Avenue, which had 521 seats. After the old Gramercy Theatre succumbed to TV competition in the early 1950s, the newer theater dropped "Park" from its name.

In the 1950s, the theater was purchased by Cinema V, an art-film presentation and distribution company. The theater was considered an "art house" due to eclectic programming, its unconventional policy of barring admittance near the end of a film, and coffee served in the waiting area. Cinema V was descended from Rugoff & Becker theaters, a chain started in 1921 by Don Rugoff's father. Rugoff gained control of the company in 1957 and expanded the chain, adding several venues including the Gramercy Theatre. Some of the programming that The New York Times lists in the 50s for the Gramercy Theatre switched from single bookings to double features, a novel approach for the time. There were a mix of foreign, sub-run mainstream, Disney films, and revivals.

In the early 1970s, the Theatre was a dollar-theater, showing third run movies. In the late 1970s it showed second-run films such as The Spy Who Loved Me, New York, New York, 3 Women, and Outrageous!.In the early 1980s, still under Cinema V, the theater showcased first-run movies. Cinema V changed to City Cinemas in the late 1980s, and did record breaking business until Cineplex Odeon opened the nine-screen Chelsea Cinemas and large audiences disappeared from Gramercy. In 1992, City Cinemas closed the theater after using it briefly as a Hollywood classics revival house.

In 1995, Amit Govil, a real estate investor, revived the theater into the only movie house in the five boroughs to exclusively feature films made in India. Immediately before that, it was the home of an anti-drug agency. It was also used around this time as the location shoot for The Fugees video "Killing Me Softly".

In 1998, the theater was renovated into a 499-seat playhouse to present Off Broadway theatrical productions, the largest in the city. In 1999, the Roundabout Theater Company premiered plays by contemporary writers such as Brian Friel, Paula Vogel, Beth Henley, and Harold Pinter. Performances included Charles Randolph-Wright's play with music, Blue starring Phylicia Rashad; Martin McDonagh's A Skull in Connemara; Speaking in Tongues with Karen Allen; and Richard Greenberg's The Dazzle.

In 2002, Roundabout presented its final offering, All Over by Edward Albee, before closing in September. Soon after, in 2002, the Museum of Modern Art used the theater as a temporary film-house, while its location on 53rd Street in Midtown Manhattan was remodeled. From 2002 to 2004, the theater was simultaneously used as a film-house and an Off-Broadway playhouse. In 2004, the theater was shut down after its last production of Lee Summers's From My Hometown, which ran from April 12 to July 12, 2004. MoMA stopped using it as a cinema in April 2004.

In 2006, Live Nation bought the space with the intention of turning it into an intimate concert venue. The first performance under Live Nation was Stellastarr on March 7, 2007. On April 26, 2007, Blender magazine became an official namesake sponsor and the venue was renamed the Blender Theater at Gramercy (note: "Theatre" was officially changed to "Theater" for the sponsorship). After two years, the name changed back to the Gramercy Theatre without a sponsorship in the name.
