= Bubbling Brown Sugar =

- Music: Various
- Lyrics: Various
- Book: Loften Mitchell
- Basis: On a concept by Rosetta LeNoire
- Productions: 1976 Broadway; 1976 West End

Bubbling Brown Sugar is a musical revue written by Loften Mitchell based on a concept by Rosetta LeNoire and featuring the music of numerous African-American artists who were popular during the Harlem Renaissance, 1920–1940, including Duke Ellington, Eubie Blake, Count Basie, Cab Calloway, and Fats Waller. Original music, including the title theme song "Bubbling Brown Sugar," was composed by pianist Emme Kemp, a protégé of the legendary Eubie Blake. It was nominated for the Tony Award for Best Musical and the Laurence Olivier Award for Best New Musical. Robert M. Cooper directed and produced the Broadway and tour productions.

The show was set in a Harlem nightclub of the 1920s-1940s. It originally played at the Church of St. Paul and St. Andrew, opening on February 15, 1975, and running for 12 performances. It opened on Broadway at the ANTA Playhouse on March 2, 1976, and closed on December 31, 1977, after 766 performances.

== Synopsis ==
Setting: Harlem, 1970s and 1920-1940

Based on a reading of the original book by Loften Mitchell.

The show opens in the 1970s on the corner of 131st Street and 7th Avenue. The ensemble (composed of GENE, MARSHA, BILL, TONY, NORMA, LAURA, SKIP, RAY, and HELEN) greets IRENE PAIGE, who is out searching for her old partner, JOHN SAGE. Irene explains that when they were younger, she pursued a career doing "downtown shows" in lieu of helping Sage build up new theatre venues in Harlem. This caused them to separate, though they have remained close over the years. Irene has traveled to Paris, London, and Rome, but she declares that Harlem will forever be her true home.

Sage and CHECKERS CLARK enter with an old trunk they intend to donate to the Schomburg Collection for Black History and Culture. The trunk contains old costumes and props from a time when they performed alongside Irene. A young couple (JIM and ELLA) enter, greeting Sage, Checker, and Irene. Jim complains about Ella dragging him around Harlem to examine the historical sights, including a landmark known as the Tree of Hope. Sage and Irene try to impart a history lesson regarding the Tree, though their bickering gets in the way.

It is revealed that, in their younger days, Sage and Checkers would take white people on tours of Harlem, though Irene insists the former never got his facts straight and the latter would always get the group lost. They recall an old comedian, Bert Williams, and recreate his famous Poker Game Pantomime routine. Sage offers to take Jim and Ella on a tour "through space and time", invoking an old Legend of Harlem that asserts you can travel to the past by looking into the setting sun's last ray of light. Sage tells Irene to stay behind, insisting she'll get caught up in the glamorous lifestyle that undid their love so long ago.

After traveling through time, the group (Sage, Checkers, Jim, and Ella) find themselves at an unnamed speakeasy in the 1920s. Sage is excited to see a white performer named JUDY CANTRELL but is put off by the waiter, who initially tries to deny them service before overcharging for drinks. Judy introduces the group to her white boyfriend, CHARLES PENDLETON III. Charles is a "horn-rimmed, Ivy League-suited young man in his twenties" who is eager to "do a little slumming". When Charles pays for their drinks with a large sum of cash, Sage is convinced that he and Judy should join their tour.

On the streets of New York City, Charles learns about "strolling" and how to dance the Charleston. At 135th and Lancy, the group discusses the Grand Central Station of Harlem, otherwise known as "The Pearly Gates" for everyone who came to the neighborhood looking to start a new life. Irene attempts to join them in the past to straighten out some of Sage's facts, but she is dismissed.

Young versions of Irene, Sage, and Checkers are seen meeting for the first time. The older Irene reappears and recreates a routine with the older Sage. Their revelry is spoiled when Sage prioritizes his tour for the wealthy Charles, which causes Irene to storm off.

The group tours the club scene, visiting locations like the 101 Ranch, Connie's Inn, Dickie Wells, and Saratoga. Sage and Checkers appear as "Rusty" and "Dusty" to perform a comedy routine. As the group begins to make their way to the Savoy, Irene is confronted by DUTCH, the gangster who convinced her to perform at the Cotton Club when she was a younger woman. Irene changes the past and rejects Dutch's offer, proclaiming that she'll stick with Sage instead.

Jim and Ella are invited to attend a House Rent Party, at which the latter performs a song to secure their admission and access to food. They run into BUMPY JACKSON, a numbers man who is seen threatening Dutch. As Prohibition has recently been repealed, Bumpy is concerned that the Dutch will begin infringing on his numbers racket.

Judy and Charlie, having lost Checkers and the rest of the group, continue to explore Harlem on their own. Charlie is particularly taken with the neighborhood and vows to reject his dull upbringing by buying a brownstone at 138th and Seventh.

Everyone reconvenes at Small's Paradise for one final celebration. Though Ella wishes she and Jim could stay in the past forever, Sage implores her to instead look toward the future.

== Characters ==
- John Sage / Rusty - Avon Long
- Irene Paige - Josephine Premice (replacing Thelma Carpenter who left prior to Broadway)
- Marsha / Young Irene - Vivian Reed
- Checkers - Joseph Attles
- Dusty Ella - Ethel Beatty
- Carolyn / Gospel Lady / Nightclub Singer - Carolyn Byrd
- Jim / Nightclub singer - Chip Garnett

== Songs ==
- Harlem '70
- Bubbling Brown Sugar (Vocal Arrangement by Chapman Roberts)
- That's What Harlem Is to Me
- Bill Robinson Special
- Harlem Sweet Harlem (Vocal Arrangement by Chapman Roberts)
- Nobody
- Goin' Back in Time
- Some of These Days
- Moving Uptown
- Strolling
- I'm Gonna Tell God All My Troubles (Vocal Arrangement by Chapman Roberts)
- Medley: His Eye Is on the Sparrow/Swing Low Sweet Chariot (Vocal Arrangement by Chapman Roberts)
- Sweet Georgia Brown
- Honeysuckle Rose
- Stormy Monday Blues
- Rosetta
- Sophisticated Lady
- In Honeysuckle Time, When Emaline Said She'd Be Mine
- Solitude (Vocal Arrangement by Chapman Roberts)
- C'mon Up to Jive Time
- Medley: "Stompin' at the Savoy / "Take the 'A' Train"
- Harlem - time
- Love Will Find a Way
- Dutch's Song
- Brown Gal
- Pray for the Lights to Go Out
- I Got It Bad
- Harlem Makes Me Feel!
- Jim, Jam, Jumpin' Jive
- There'll Be Some Changes Made
- God Bless the Child
- It Don't Mean a Thing (Vocal Arrangement by Chapman Roberts)

== Awards and nominations ==
=== Original Broadway production ===
Year	Award	Category	Nominee	Result
1976	Tony Award	Best Musical		Nominated
1976	Tony Award	Best Performance by a Leading Actress in a Musical	Vivian Reed	Nominated
1976	Tony Award	Best Choreography	Billy Wilson	Nominated
1976	Drama Desk Award	Outstanding Featured Actor in a Musical	Barry Preston	Nominated
1976	Drama Desk Award	Outstanding Featured Actress in a Musical	Vivian Reed	Won
1976	Drama Desk Award	Outstanding Choreography	Billy Wilson	Nominated
1976	Drama Desk Award	Outstanding Costume Design	Bernard Johnson	Nominated
1976	Theatre World Award		Chip Garnett	Won
1976	Theatre World Award		Vivian Reed	Won

=== Original London production ===
Year	Award	Category	Nominee	Result
1977	Laurence Olivier Award	Best New Musical		Nominated
1977	Laurence Olivier Award	Best Performance in a Musical	Charles Augins	Nominated
1977	Laurence Olivier Award	Best Performance in a Musical	Helen Glezer	Nominated
