= Loften Mitchell =

American dramatist (1919–2001)

James Loften Mitchell (April 15, 1919 – May 14, 2001) was an American playwright and theatre historian who was part of the black American theatre movement of the 1960s.

== Life and career ==
Mitchell was born in Columbus, North Carolina, to an African-American family, and moved as a young child with his parents to Harlem, New York City. As a high school student, he began performing and writing theatrical sketches, and joined the Rose McClendon Players. He met performers such as Ethel Waters and George Wiltshire, and encountered racial discrimination at first hand in his everyday life. As a result, he resolved to work towards presenting positive images of blacks, and providing better work opportunities, in the theatre. He attended the City College of New York and won a scholarship to attend Talladega College in Alabama, where he wrote a paper which later became the basis of his 1967 book, Black Drama: The Story of the American Negro in the Theatre. He married Helen Marsh in 1943; they had two sons, and later divorced.

After serving two years in the U.S. Naval Reserve in World War II, he returned to Harlem and set up a theatre group, the 115th Street People's Theatre, putting on his first play, Blood in the Night, in 1946. He became a graduate student at Columbia University between 1947 and 1951, studying playwriting, while also working as an investigator for the Department of Welfare. His play The Bancroft Dynasty was produced for the People's Theatre in 1948. The theatre group then developed into the Harlem Showcase Theatre, which presented Mitchell's The Shame of the Nation in 1952, based on a notorious rape case, followed by his plays The Cellar and City Called Norfolk.

From 1950 until 1962, Mitchell wrote for, and acted in, The Later Years, a radio program on New York station WNYC. His 1957 play A Land Beyond the River was a fictionalised adaptation of the life of schoolteacher and pastor Joseph DeLaine, whose lawsuit helped end segregation in public schools in the United States. The play had a long off-Broadway run and was later published as a book. Mitchell won a Guggenheim Fellowship in 1958. In 1960, he released the three-act play Star of the Morning, for which he wrote the script and music, and for which Romare Bearden and Clyde Fox wrote the lyrics.

Mitchell also wrote Tell Pharaoh, in which the characters reflect on their African origins and experiences through slavery to the civil rights movement; and, with Irving Burgie, wrote Ballad for Bimshire, an off-Broadway musical. From 1971, Mitchell was a professor at the State University of New York at Binghamton. His novel, The Stubborn Old Lady Who Resisted Change, was published in 1973, and he edited Voices of the Black Theatre (1975).

In 1976, Mitchell was nominated for a Tony Award for the revue Bubbling Brown Sugar. It was staged in both New York and London, where it was nominated for a Laurence Olivier Award. His 1983 musical, Miss Waters, To You, was based on the life of actress and singer Ethel Waters.

Mitchell remarried in 1991, to Gloria Anderson. He died in Queens, New York, on May 14, 2001, aged 82.
