= Bruce Bonafede =

American dramatist

Bruce Bonafede is an American playwright. He is a Lifetime Member of the Dramatists Guild.

Bonafede's first produced play, Advice to the Players, is a drama that studies the relationship between art and politics. The play's inspiration was an incident at the 1981 International Theater Festival in Baltimore, where two acclaimed South African actors were caught up in an international boycott of South Africa's apartheid policies. The play was first produced as part of Actors Theatre of Louisville's "Shorts" Festival in November 1984, the original production starred Delroy Lindo and Joe Morton. The play was produced again at the Actors Theatre of Louisville Humana Festival for New American Plays in April 1985, and won the Heideman Award as best one-act play of the festival. Following the production at Actors Theatre of Louisville, a 90-minute version without intermission was produced at the Philadelphia Festival of New Plays in 1986. Advice to the Players was published in Literary Cavalcade, a Scholastic magazine, and the anthology Best Short Plays-1986. The 90-minute version of the play was published by Samuel French in 2015.

== Ghostwriting ==
Bonafede is a contributor and editor for the business book Manager's Guide to Crisis Management (ISBN 0071769498) by Jonathan Bernstein (Briefcase Books Series), published in 2011.

Other writing projects remain confidential due to contractual agreements.

== Awards ==
Advice to the Players, his first produced play, won the Heideman Award at the Humana Festival of New American Plays at Actors Theatre of Louisville in 1985.

== Published works ==
- Advice to the Players (1985) (ISBN 0573620318)
- Nobody Knows My Name by Anonymous (2013) (ISBN 1626522650)
