= Douglas Watt (critic) =

American dramatist

Douglas Benjamin Watt (January 20, 1914 – September 29, 2009) was an American theater critic who spent nearly six decades covering Broadway theatre — and then Off Broadway and Off-Off-Broadway — for the Daily News and also reported on classical music and opera for The New Yorker. He helped establish Porgy and Bess as a classic after it failed in an earlier Broadway run and helped foster the careers of playwrights such as Eugene O'Neill and Tennessee Williams.

== Early life and education ==
Watt was born on January 20, 1914, in the Bronx. He grew up in New Jersey, in both Hackensack and Ridgewood. After graduating early from high school, he enrolled at Cornell University and graduated at age 19.

== Theater critic ==
Watt was hired as a copy boy by the Daily News in 1936. One of his first tasks at the paper was to transport images to the Daily News offices in Manhattan from the Lindbergh kidnapping trial in Flemington, New Jersey.

Beginning in the paper's drama department, he worked his way up to become its theater critic and he remained with the Daily News for over 50 years. After seeing a New Jersey revival of Porgy and Bess in 1941, he encouraged producer Cheryl Crawford to bring the show back to Broadway in a second run that doubled the length of its failed 1935 Broadway debut, and helped earn the play "its landmark place in theater history".

He served in the United States Army during World War II, stationed on Okinawa as a reporter for Stars and Stripes.

William Shawn of The New Yorker tried to hire Watt for the New Yorker in 1945 however Watt was unwilling to give up his beat as a newspaper theater critic and Shawn gave him a column at the New Yorker as a music critic.

In 1971 a favorable review from Watt of Jesus Christ Superstar helped director Andrew Lloyd Webber overcome a negative review from The New York Times and led the play to a lengthy run.

Watt not only covered Broadway, he was also a pianist and songwriter whose songs "After All These Years" and "Heaven Help Me" were recorded by Doris Day and Frankie Laine. He also worked with Duke Ellington on a play adapted from George Bernard Shaw's Caesar and Cleopatra. He was friends with composers Frank Loesser, Richard Rodgers and Kurt Weill, and helped spur the careers of Eugene O'Neill and Tennessee Williams. During his career at the Daily News, he was able to attend the 1949 debut of Death of a Salesman starring Lee J. Cobb in the title role of Willy Loman, as well as the 50th-anniversary production of the play with Brian Dennehy in the lead.

One of the founders of the Drama Desk Awards, Watt served on the nominating committee for both the Pulitzer Prize for Drama and the Tony Awards.

== Death ==
Watt died at age 95 on September 29, 2009, in Southampton, New York because of pneumonia. At the time of his death, he resided in both Southampton and Manhattan. He was survived by his second wife, the former Ethel Madsen, as well as by two daughters, two sons, eight grandchildren and six great-grandchildren. His first marriage had been ended by divorce.
