= Church of St. Paul and St. Andrew (New York City) =

Church in Manhattan, New York

Coordinates: 40°47′20.1″N 73°58′38.6″W

United Methodist Church of Saint Paul and Saint Andrew

Religion
- Affiliation: United Methodist Church
- District: New York Annual Conference
- Leadership: Bishop Jeremiah Jungchan Park
- Status: Active

Location
- Location: New York City, New York, United States
- Interactive map of United Methodist Church of Saint Paul and Saint Andrew

Architecture
- Architect: Robert Henderson Robertson
- Style: Gothic Revival
- Completed: 1897

The Church of Saint Paul and Saint Andrew is a historic United Methodist church on the Upper West Side of New York City, New York, on West 86th Street. The senior pastor is Rev. Dr. James (K) Karpen and the associate pastor is Rev. Lea Matthews.

== History ==
St. Paul and St. Andrews United Methodist Church sanctuary.

The church was founded in 1897. The church building was declared a landmark by the New York City Landmarks Preservation Commission in 1981. The congregation challenged the designation in 1986, but the LPC denied an application to demolish the church building.

== Beliefs ==
=== Marriage ===
The church has an inclusive vision and celebrates both opposite-sex marriages and same-sex marriages.
