= Jonathan Cerullo =

American director and choreographer

- Born: Jonathan Stuart Cerullo; December 21, 1960 (age 65); Mount Vernon, New York, U.S.
- Education: Emerson College
- Occupations: director, executive producer, choreographer, dramaturge
- Years active: 1982–present

Jonathan Stuart Cerullo (born December 21, 1960) is an American director and choreographer, executive producer, dramaturge, and former performer. Cerullo is known for his work on Broadway, Off-Broadway, and regionally. He has also worked in circus, film, and television and internationally having worked in Canada and Amsterdam.

== Personal life ==
He is a descendant of the broader Frezzolini family, including the Italian operatic soprano Erminia Frezzolini.. His Grandmother, Maria Frezzolini, born in 1907, in Anguillara Sabazia, Italy emigrated to America and resided in Mt Vernon NY, was a descendant.

Cerullo's home has been featured in The New York Times with the article by Constance Rosenblum entitled, "Pocket-Sized on West 47th Street", the article was also selected to be part of her book entitled Habitats: Private Lives in the Big City published by NYU Press, March 25, 2013.

In 2025 he received Emerson College's Distinguished Alumni Award joining other alumni who have received the award such as Norman Lear, Jay Leno, and Henry Winkler.

== Career ==
=== 1986-2014 ===
Cerullo's first major role was in the US National III tour of the Broadway musical Cats as Skimbleshanks the Railway Cat, which ran from September 1986 to August 1988. He was Big Daddy in the West Coast production of Sweet Charity starring Tony Award winner, Donna McKechnie. Appeared at the Goodspeed Opera House, North Shore Music Theatre, the Ogunquit Playhouse, and The Cape Playhouse. He was a voting member of the Lucille Lortel Award for Off-Broadway productions, is a member of the Stage Directors and Choreographers Society, the Dramatist Guild, and the Actors' Equity Association.

He made his Broadway debut in 1984, as a Production Assistant on the musical, The Three Musketeers directed and choreographed by TONY Award-winning director, Joe Layton, also on Broadway, as a performer, Cerullo was a featured dancer in the 1988 Broadway musical Legs Diamond, starring Peter Allen, and was also featured on the BMG-RCA Original Cast Recording for the musical.

In 1992 he was the Dance Captain for Circle in the Square's Broadway production of Anna Karenina. and the Broadway musical, Band In Berlin based on the lives of the Comedian Harmonists. Cerullo worked with the late Frank Gorshin on the Broadway production of, "Say Goodnight Gracie", by Rupert Holmes at the Helen Hayes Theatre as his dance instructor and created the soft shoe routine for Gorshin as George Burns. In 1992 in Los Angeles Cerullo worked with and taught Uta Hagen, on what was to be her last stage performance for the "Six Dance Lesson in Six Weeks", by Richard Alfieri at the Geffen Playhouse, David Hyde Pierce was her co-star, and the production was choreographed by Kay Cole. He later interviewed Kay Cole for TheaterMania.

After working with him on the Broadway musical, Anna Karenina, choreographer and director Patricia Birch began mentoring Cerullo. Through this partnership, Cerullo was hired as Associate Choreograph for Birch on the Public Broadcasting Service (PBS) series Great Performances for This Is The Moment, starring Donny Osmond and Vanessa Williams, and Natalie Cole's Untraditional Traditional Christmas Special. Cerullo was also the Assistant Choreographer to Patrica on the films The First Wives Club, starring Bette Midler, Diane Keaton and Goldie Hawn and The Cowboy Way starring Woody Harrelson. Cerullo also worked with Pat Birch on the St. Ann's Warehouse production of Band in Berlin as the Assistant Director and Choreographer.

Cerullo directed the original musical Fools' Paradise, by Jim Camacho. At Lincoln Center, he choreographed the productions of Picturesque and Carnevale! for the Big Apple Circus. and received a Village Voice 2003 Voice Choices Best Dance Pick. His work for the production was detailed in Backstage, Theatre Artists Take on Challenges of the Circus, by Simi Horwitz.

In 2003, Cerullo choreographed Orpheus Descending for Great Performances Evening At Pops with the Boston Pops conducted by maestro, Keith Lockhart. He was Special Effects Movement Consultant to Bette Midler on the film "The Stepford Wives" in 2004. He also conceived, directed and produced the video tribute to Mr. George Abbott for the "Mr. Abbott Award" for Lifetime Achievement in the American Theatre, presented annually by the Stage Director and Choreographers Society.

Cerullo received the Newhouse Scholarship from Career Transition for Dancers to form his production company called JSCTheatricals, LLC. In October 2013 he made his debut as Producer under his newly formed company for the Grand Central Terminal's Centennial Celebration presentation of Orphan Train, The Musical directed by Patricia Birch.

=== 2015-present ===
Cerullo directed the world premiere of Windywoo and Her Naughty Naughty Pets a new musical for children of all ages, for the 2015 NY Musical Festival. Cerullo directed Fictitious, a new musical by Paul Cozby and Tom Hyndman, for the Theatre Now New York SOUND BITES 3.0 annual 10-minute musical festival, for which he received the award for Best Director.

In 2016, he directed the NYC premiere of RISE, written and performed by Scott Barry at the Museum of Sex. Cerullo also had the honor of working on the 30th anniversary of the Easter Bonnet Competition at the Minskoff Theater by conceiving, directing and choreographing the Bucket Brigade Tribute. In 2016, for the New York Musical Festival, Cerullo choreographed the production of Lisa and Leonardo written by Donya Lane and Ed McNamee. Cerullo was interviewed by Bob Rizzo for BroadwayWorld.com, Also in 2016 Cerullo directed the NY premiere of CHANCE, the musical written by Richard Isen for the Fresh Fruit Festival. His received positive reviews for his work in OUTERSTAGE. Finally in 2016 he directed and staged the NY Premiere of The Fifth Dentist In Search Of Sid's Treasure A Tribute to the Sultan Of Striptease at the NY International Fringe Festival. Cerullo was quoted in The New York Times about his involvement with this production.

He also produced Conrack, The Musical based on Pat Conroy's the "Water is Wide", featuring Tony Award nominees Vivian Reed and Ernestine Jackson and Tony Award nominee A.J. Shively at York Theatre Company Development Reading Series By Granville Burgess and music By Emmy Award-winning composer Doug Katsaros directed by Stuart Ross. Cerullo is preparing Willie & Me, The Emmett Kelly Story. This was written by Cerullo and Stephen Woodburn.

Cerullo is the producer and director of the Broadway musical Legs Diamond at Feinstein's 54 Below with original cast members, two-time Tony Award nominee Christine Andreas, Tony Award nominee Brenda Braxton, and two-time Tony nominee Bob Stillman and Randall Edwards. He directed and choreographed an all-male version of Rodgers and Hart musical comedy, The Boys From Syracuse for Musicals Tonight! Off-Broadway at the Lion Theatre on Theatre Row. John Soltes Interview Rediscovering Rodgers and Hart's "". Jonathan staged Amas Musical Theatre's No Foolin' A Musical Confection. Honoring Tony Award winner, Grammy Award winner, Micki Grant Hosted by Brad Oscar.

Bob Ost, executive director, president, and co-founder of Theatre Resources Unlimited TRU, hired Cerullo to direct their 2018 TRU LOVE benefit honoring John Chatterton, Baayork Lee, and her National Asian Artists Project. The event featured Tony Award winners Priscilla Lopez, Donna McKechnie, and Brenda Braxton. Amas Musical Theatre hired Jonathan to write and direct Amas@50 Anniversary Concert. Honorary Chair ~ Whoopi Goldberg, Hosted by Lillias White and featuring Leslie Uggams, Vivian Reed, Christopher Jackson actor, Lance Roberts, Len Cariou, N'Kenge, Soara-Joye Ross, Elijah Ahmad Lewis and a Special video appearance by Petula Clark. The gala is honoring Harry Belafonte, Sharleen Cooper Cohen, Donna Trinkoff, and Shelly Berger manager of The Temptations. In 2019 he was made an Artistic Associate at Amas Music Theatre.

He produced the James Parks Morton Interfaith Award honoring Dr. Ruth Westheimer and Bishop Curry in 2019. The event was hosted by Mo Rocca.

2020 Cerullo directed Jen Chapin's Essential Stories. Jen Chapin is the daughter of the late singer-songwriter Harry Chapin. He also conceived, produced, and directed With Love, Now and Forever! CATSCOVIDRELIEF for Broadway Cares COVID-19 Emergency Relief Fund for Actors Fund of America. After 34 years the third National Touring Company of Cats (musical) reunited for this special event hosted by Broadway and TV star Brian Stokes Mitchell and Tom Viola.

He also appears on Stars in the House as well as Broadway Network Podcast Cerullo, in 2021, made his Los Angeles directorial debut at the award-winning theatre, The Blank Theatre with Scott Barry's Hard On Love starring Los Angeles Drama Critics Award-winner Rob Nagle and from RuPaul's Drag Race Brita Filter aka Jesse Havea. Cerullo wrote the script for Amas Musical Theatre's 2021 gala AMAS YOU LOVE, a Heart to Heart Celebration. Directed by Maria Torres, hosted by Justina Machado, and receiving the 2021 Rosie Award was Tony Award-winner Lillias White.

In May he wrote the tribute segment to Sheryl Lee Ralph recipient of Amas Musical Theatre's Rosie Award presented to her by Brian Stokes Mitchell

In December 2023, Cerullo, an original cast member, directed for the New York Public Library for the Performing Arts at Lincoln Center of Legs Diamond, the musical, in Concert & Conversation starring original cast members, Brenda Braxton, Bob Stillman, Christine Andreas and Randall Edwards. The musical was written by Peter Allen, Charles Suppon and Harvey Fierstein. The evening was moderated and hosted by Broadway World's Richard Ridge.

Amas Musical Theater's 55-year Benefit Gala honoring Patricia Birch and Len Cariou was directed and staged by Cerullo, featuring Lorna Luft, Liz Callaway, Hugh Panaro, and Lee Roy Reams.

In 2025, he directed and choreographed the NY Off-Broadway premiere of Mr Puppy, The Musical, based on the popular brand of the same name. Music and lyrics were composed by Grammy-nominated composer David Tolley.

Directed and Staged the 50th Anniversary Concert of Bubbling Brown Sugar starring the Broadway veteran and award winning artist, Darlesia Cearcy and Darius de Haas. Celebrity Chief and TV Personality Carla Hall was the guest of honor and provided a Harlem Renaissance menu for the event.

He executive produced and directed the documentary, Finding Meaningful Food, A Video Memoir by Harriet V. Kuhnlein

== Awards and nominations ==
Year	Award	Category	Work	Result
2009	Theatre for The American Musical Prize & NYMF Best of Fest	NY Music Theatre festival	Under Fire, A New Musical	Won
2012	Caroline Newhouse Scholarship	Career Transition for Dancers		Won
2016	SoundBites 3.0 - Theatre Now NY - Award of Excellence	Best Director	Fictitious	Won
2016	Fresh Fruit Festival - Director	Outstanding Production Design and Outstanding Performance in a Musical	CHANCE	Won
2018	The Actors Fund - Encore Award	Extraordinary Dedication to the Performing Arts		Won
2018	Byram Hills Theatre Honors	Certificate of Appreciation	BHHS Theatre Program	Won
2020	Stage Directors and Choreographers	President's Award for Extraordinary Service		Won
2023	Stage Directors and Choreographers	President's Award for Extraordinary Service		Won
2025	Emerson College Alumni Association	Distinguished Alumni Award		Won
2025	CreateTheatre New Works Festival	Best Musical	Green, The Musical	Won
