= 43rd Tony Awards =

1989 US theatrical awards ceremony

- Date: June 4, 1989
- Location: Lunt-Fontanne Theatre, New York City, New York
- Hosted by: Angela Lansbury
- Most wins: Jerome Robbins' Broadway (6)
- Most nominations: Black and Blue and Jerome Robbins' Broadway (10)

Television/radio coverage
- Network: CBS

The 43rd Annual Tony Awards, which honor achievement in the Broadway theatre was held on June 4, 1989, at the Lunt-Fontanne Theatre and broadcast by CBS television. The host was Angela Lansbury, making her fifth appearance as host, more than any other individual.

There were no nominations for Best Book of a Musical or for Best Score of a Musical.

== Eligibility ==
Shows that opened on Broadway during the 1988–1989 season before May 2, 1989 are eligible.

Original plays

- Checkmates
- Eastern Standard
- Ghetto
- The Heidi Chronicles
- Hizzoner!
- Largely New York
- Lend Me a Tenor
- Metamorphosis
- Rumors
- Run for Your Wife
- Shirley Valentine
- Spoils of War

Original musicals

- Black and Blue
- Canciones de Mi Padre
- Carrie
- Chu Chem
- Jerome Robbins' Broadway
- Legs Diamond
- Senator Joe
- Starmites
- Welcome to the Club

Play revivals

- Ah, Wilderness!
- Born Yesterday
- Cafe Crown
- The Devil's Disciple
- Long Day's Journey into Night
- Juno and the Paycock
- The Night of the Iguana
- Our Town
- Paul Robeson

Musical revivals

- Ain't Misbehavin'

== The ceremony ==
Presenters and Performers: Barry Bostwick, Betty Buckley, Zoe Caldwell, Nell Carter, Carol Channing, Colleen Dewhurst, Jerry Herman, James Earl Jones, Larry Kert, Swoosie Kurtz, John Lithgow, Steve Martin, Richard Thomas, Tommy Tune, Leslie Uggams, Gwen Verdon, August Wilson, BD Wong.

Musicals and Plays represented:

- Black and Blue ("Tain't Nobody's Bizness If I Do"/"That Rhythm Man" - Company)
- Jerome Robbins' Broadway ("Dance at the Gym" from West Side Story - Company)
- Starmites ("Starmites"/"Hard to Be Diva" - Company)
- The Heidi Chronicles (Scene with Joan Allen and Peter Friedman)
- Largely New York (with Bill Irwin and ensemble)
- Lend Me a Tenor (Scene with Philip Bosco and Victor Garber)
- Shirley Valentine (Scene with Pauline Collins)

Special Salute:

- "The Eleven O'Clock Number"/"Everything's Coming up Roses" from Gypsy (with Angela Lansbury)
- "Send in the Clowns" from A Little Night Music
- "Memory" from Cats (with Betty Buckley)
- "Being Alive" from Company (with Larry Kert)

== Winners and nominees ==
Winners are in bold

Best Play	Best Musical
**The Heidi Chronicles – Wendy Wasserstein**; Largely New York – Bill Irwin; Lend Me a Tenor – Ken Ludwig; Shirley Valentine – Willy Russell	**Jerome Robbins' Broadway**; Black and Blue; Starmites
Best Revival	Best Choreography
**Our Town**; Ah, Wilderness!; Ain't Misbehavin'; Cafe Crown	**Cholly Atkins, Henry LeTang, Frankie Manning and Fayard Nicholas – Black and Blue**; Michele Assaf – Starmites; Bill Irwin and Kimi Okada – Largely New York; Alan Johnson – Legs Diamond
Best Performance by a Leading Actor in a Play	Best Performance by a Leading Actress in a Play
**Philip Bosco – Lend Me a Tenor as Saunders**; Mikhail Baryshnikov – Metamorphosis as Gregor Samsa; Victor Garber – Lend Me a Tenor as Max; Bill Irwin – Largely New York as The Post-Modern Hoofer	**Pauline Collins – Shirley Valentine as Shirley Valentine**; Joan Allen – The Heidi Chronicles as Heidi Holland; Madeline Kahn – Born Yesterday as Billie Dawn; Kate Nelligan – Spoils of War as Elise
Best Performance by a Leading Actor in a Musical	Best Performance by a Leading Actress in a Musical
**Jason Alexander – Jerome Robbins' Broadway as Various Characters**; Gabriel Barre – Starmites as Trinkulus/Shak Graa; Brian Lane Green – Starmites as Spacepunk; Robert La Fosse – Jerome Robbins' Broadway as Various Characters	**Ruth Brown – Black and Blue as Singer**; Charlotte d'Amboise – Jerome Robbins' Broadway as Various Characters; Linda Hopkins – Black and Blue as Singer; Sharon McNight – Starmites as Mother/Diva
Best Performance by a Featured Actor in a Play	Best Performance by a Featured Actress in a Play
**Boyd Gaines – The Heidi Chronicles as Peter Patrone**; Peter Frechette – Eastern Standard as Drew; Eric Stoltz – Our Town as George Gibbs; Gordon Joseph Weiss – Ghetto as The Dummy	**Christine Baranski – Rumors as Chris Gorman**; Joanne Camp – The Heidi Chronicles as Various Characters; Tovah Feldshuh – Lend Me a Tenor as Maria; Penelope Ann Miller – Our Town as Emily Webb
Best Performance by a Featured Actor in a Musical	Best Performance by a Featured Actress in a Musical
**Scott Wise – Jerome Robbins' Broadway as Various Characters**; Bunny Briggs – Black and Blue as Hoofer; Savion Glover – Black and Blue as Younger Generation; Scott Wentworth – Welcome to the Club as Aaron Bates	**Debbie Shapiro – Jerome Robbins' Broadway as Various Characters**; Jane Lanier – Jerome Robbins' Broadway as Socialite/2nd Dancer; Faith Prince – Jerome Robbins' Broadway as Ma/Tessie; Julie Wilson – Legs Diamond as Flo
Best Direction of a Play	Best Direction of a Musical
**Jerry Zaks – Lend Me a Tenor**; Bill Irwin – Largely New York; Gregory Mosher – Our Town; Daniel Sullivan – The Heidi Chronicles	**Jerome Robbins – Jerome Robbins' Broadway**; Larry Carpenter – Starmites; Peter Mark Schifter – Welcome to the Club; Claudio Segovia and Hector Orezzoli – Black and Blue
Best Scenic Design	Best Costume Design
**Santo Loquasto – Cafe Crown**; Thomas Lynch – The Heidi Chronicles; Claudio Segovia and Héctor Orezzoli – Black and Blue; Tony Walton – Lend Me a Tenor	**Claudio Segovia and Hector Orezzoli – Black and Blue**; Jane Greenwood – Our Town; Willa Kim – Legs Diamond; William Ivey Long – Lend Me a Tenor
Best Lighting Design
**Jennifer Tipton – Jerome Robbins' Broadway**; Neil Peter Jampolis and Jane Reisman – Black and Blue; Brian Nason – Metamorphosis; Nancy Schertler – Largely New York

== Regional Theatre Tony Award ==
- Hartford Stage Company, Hartford, Connecticut

=== Multiple nominations and awards ===
These productions had multiple nominations:

- 10 nominations: Black and Blue and Jerome Robbins' Broadway
- 7 nominations: Lend Me a Tenor
- 6 nominations: The Heidi Chronicles and Starmites
- 5 nominations: Largely New York and Our Town
- 3 nominations: Legs Diamond
- 2 nominations: Cafe Crown, Metamorphosis, Shirley Valentine and Welcome to the Club

The following productions received multiple awards.

- 6 wins: Jerome Robbins' Broadway
- 3 wins: Black and Blue
- 2 wins: The Heidi Chronicles and Lend Me a Tenor

== See also ==
- Drama Desk Awards
- Obie Award
- New York Drama Critics' Circle
- Theatre World Award
- Lucille Lortel Awards
