= Janet Aldrich =

American actress and singer (born 1956)

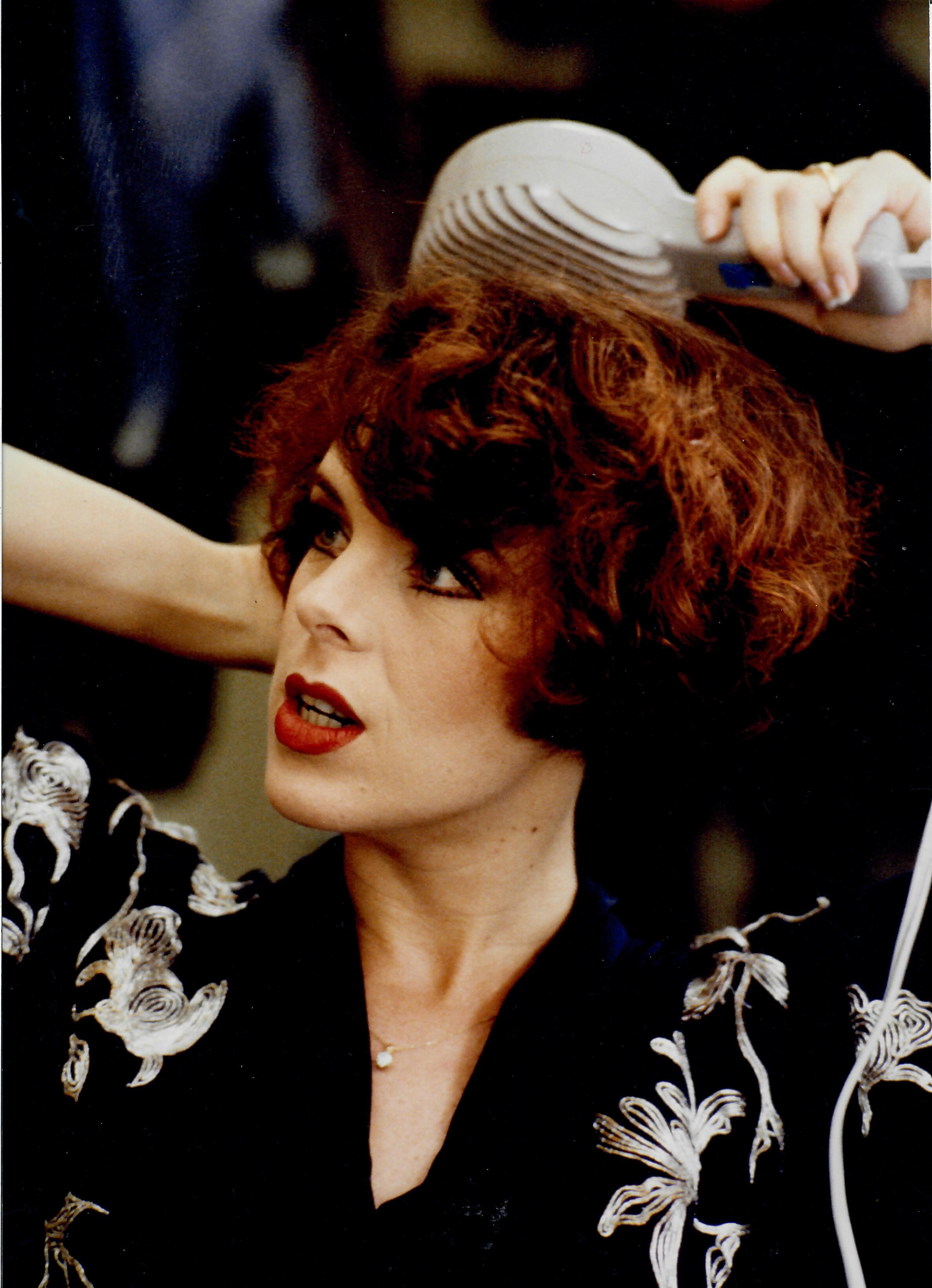
- Aldrich in 1987
- Born: Janet Wallerich; October 16, 1956 (age 69); Hinsdale, Illinois, US
- Other names: Janet Aldridge; Janet Valdes-Dapena
- Occupation: Actress

Janet Aldrich (born Janet Wallerich; October 16, 1956 in Hinsdale, Illinois) is an American actress and singer. Born in Hinsdale, Illinois and raised in Naples, Florida, she studied theatre at the University of Miami. She has had an active performance career since 1980. She has appeared in several Broadway musicals and plays, and has worked in American regional theatre; notably winning a Helen Hayes Award in 1986 for her performance in the Washington D.C. production of Forbidden Broadway. She has also worked in theaters in Europe, and was awarded France's Victoires de la Musique award in 1987 for her portrayal of Sally Bowles in the Paris production of Cabaret. While primarily a stage actress, she has also worked in American television and film.

== Early life and education ==
The daughter of George M. Wallerich and Frances Wallerich (later Frances Aldridge), Janet Marie Wallerich was born on October 16, 1956. Originally from Hinsdale, Illinois, she moved to Naples, Florida with her parents in 1966. Her father worked in real estate development. Her mother was Canadian by birth, and was employed as a model and later secretary for the Marshall Field's department store. Her parents divorced and her mother married Janet's step-father, Frank M. Aldridge, in 1972.

Janet studied theatre at the University of Miami (UM). While there she portrayed Maria in Leonard Bernstein's West Side Story at the UM's Jerry Herman Ring Theatre in 1976 with a student cast that included Ray Liotta as Riff, Valerie Perri as Anita, and Bruce Lazarus as Doc. She played Laurey in the UM's Spring 1977 production of Rodgers and Hammerstein's Oklahoma! with Steven Bauer (then billed as Rocky Echevarría) as Jud. She played Cunégonde with Bauer in the title role of Candide at the UM in the Fall of 1977 in a cast that also included Saundra Santiago as the Old Lady. She graduated from the UM with B.A. in Theatre.

== Career ==
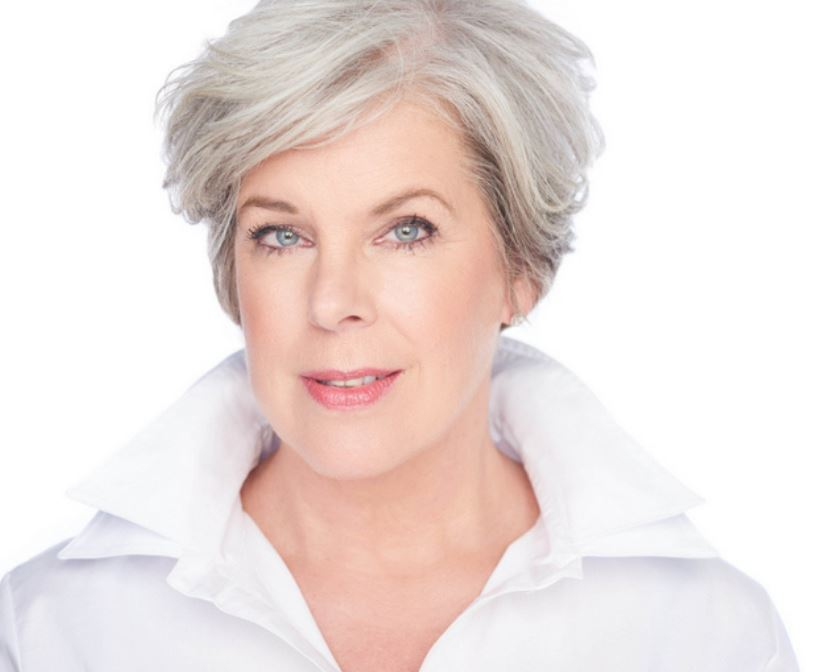
Janet Aldrich, About Artists Agency

Janet began her career performing under the name Janet Aldridge, and it was under this name that she made her New York debut in November 1980 as one of the Geminae twins at the Equity Library Theatre in Stephen Sondheim's A Funny Thing Happened on the Way to the Forum. The summer prior to this she performed the role of Osgood in Sondheim's Anyone Can Whistle at the Berkshire Theatre Festival with a cast that included George Hearn as J. Bowden Hapgood, Mary Louise Wilson as Cora Hoover Hooper, and Rhonda Coullet as Fay Apple. By 1981 she was using the stage name Jane Aldrich when she made her Broadway debut at the Uris Theatre in the musical Annie.

Aldrich subsequently returned to Broadway in the ensemble of the 1984 revival of The Three Musketeers, and as Ruby in the 1987 revival of George Abbott's play Broadway. On April 27, 1989 she performed the role of Maligna in the musical Starmites for the grand opening of the Broadway theatre Criterion Center Stage Right. After the close of that show she portrayed Lady Jaqueline Carstone as a replacement cast member in the Broadway production Me and My Girl in 1989.

Off-Broadway Aldrich portrayed the roles of Joan, the Nurse, and Exerciser in American Princess at the INTAR Theatre (1982), and Mistress Dainty in The Heather Brothers's musical Lust (1995) at John Houseman Theater. In 1986 she starred in Pump Boys and Dinettes at the Geva Theatre Center. That same year she won the Helen Hayes Award for Outstanding Actress, Resident Musical, for her work in Forbidden Broadway at the Omni Shoreham Hotel's theater in Washington D.C. For her portrayal of Sally Bowles in the Paris, France production of Cabaret she won the Victoire de la Musique award in 1987.

In 1992 Aldrich performed the role of the Baker's Wife in Sondheim's Into the Woods at the Walnut Street Theatre in Philadelphia. She was nominated for a Philadelphia Inquirer Critics Choice Award for this performance. In 1993 she starred as Rose in The Song of Singapore at the Downtown Cabaret Theater in Bridgeport, Connecticut for which she received a nomination for a Connecticut Critics Choice Award. In 1996 she portrayed Karen Richards in Charles Strouse's musical Applause at the Paper Mill Playhouse. In 2017 she portrayed Sophie Tucker in the original musical Ben, Virginia & Me (The Liberace Musical) at the New York Musical Theatre Festival.

On screen Aldrich portrayed the role of Daniel Vigne in the 1985 French film Une Femme ou Deux starring Gérard Depardieu and Sigourney Weaver. She also worked as a guest actress on the soap operas As the World Turns and Guiding Light.

== Personal life ==
Aldrich married Carlos Valdes-Dapena on April 9, 1988. They moved to Montclair, New Jersey in 1994 where they raised their two children.

== Performance credits ==
=== Filmography ===
Year	Title	Director
2026	See Me	Cormac Fingeret
2026	Expired_Link	Freya Golden
2025	Her Turn	Rebecca Skirboll
1985	Ringers	Tony Cookson
1985	Une Femme ou Deux	Daniel Vigne
2000	Jails Hospitals & Hip Hop	Danny Hoch
2008	In 500 Words or Less	Molly Fowler
2011	Liberty Road	Jason Fraley
2020	#FareLife	Brian Hogan

=== Television ===
Year	Title	Role	Location
1995	The Cosby Mysteries	Paige Coleman Episode 6	NBC
1993	Another World	Madame Charpentier, Courturier	NBC
1993	Saturday Night Live	Canteen Boys Eyes, Amy #4	NBC
1992	Saturday Night Live	Jack McManus	NBC
1992	Saturday Night Live	Unfrozen Caveman Lawyer	NBC
1992	Saturday Night Live	Unfrozen Caveman Lawyer	NBC
1992	Saturday Night Live	Tyson/Tall Tales of Recession	NBC
1992	Guiding Light	Patsy, PTA Chair	CBS
1991	Saturday Night Live	Johnny Letter	NBC
1991	Saturday Night Live	Alec Baldwin host: Jackie, his tough Biker Chick	CBS
1990	Saturday Night Live	Sheba, "Bleak Poetry" sketch with Sting	CBS
1987	Guiding Light	Sheila, Josh's call girl	CBS
1986	This Is Your Life Nikolai Volkoff	Magda, Nikolai's First Girlfriend	WWE
1985	Guiding Light	Suzy, Roxie's Friend from her dark past	CBS
1984	As the World Turns	Courtney, Script 7176	CBS
1983	Ryan's Hope	Nurse Nancy	CBS

=== Theatre ===
Year	Title	Theater	Director	Location
2025	Reunions	City Center Stage II	Gabriel Barre	Off Broadway, New York City
2024	The Wedding Singer	Gateway Playhouse	Keith Andrews	Bellport, Long Island
2021	Turtle On A Fence Post	Theater 555	Gabriel Barre	Off Broadway, New York City
2020	Tuning In - Cancelled due to COVID-19	Adirondack Theater Festival		
2017	Ben, Virginia & Me – The Liberace Musical	NYMF	Paul Stancato	Off Broadway, New York City
2016	The House of Glass - Workshop	Arena Stage	Matt Cowart	Washington, DC
2012	The Music Man	Arena Stage	Molly Smith	Washington, DC
2010	Annie	Olney Theatre Center for the Arts	Mark Waldrop	Olney, MD
2002	Annie Warbucks	Montclair Operetta Conservatory	John de la Rosa	Montclair, NJ
2001	Annie	Montclair Operetta Conservatory	John de la Rosa	Montclair, NJ
1996	Applause	Paper Mill Playhouse & Pre-Broadway Tour	Gene Saks	Millburn, NJ
1995	On the Town- Concert Version	Westfield Symphony Orchestra	Brad Keimach	Westfield, NJ
1995	Anything Goes	Downtown Cabaret Theater	Scott Thompson	Bridgeport, CT
1995	Lust	John Houseman Theater	Bob Carlton	Off Broadway, New York City
1995	Lust – The American Premiere	Walnut Street Theater	Bob Carlton	Philadelphia, PA
1994	Me and My Girl	Walnut Street Theater	Charles "Chuck" Abbott	Philadelphia, PA
1993	The Song of Singapore	Downtown Cabaret Theater	Michael Garin	Bridgeport, CT
1993	Prime Time Prophet	Players' Theatre	Kevin Connors	Off-Broadway New York City
1992	Into The Woods	Walnut Street Theater	Charles "Chuck" Abbott	Philadelphia, PA
1989	Me and My Girl	Marquis Theater	Mike Ockrent	Broadway New York City
1988	Starmites	Criterion Center	Stuart Ross	Broadway New York City
1987–1988	Cabaret – In French	Théâtre Mogador	Jérôme Savary	Paris, France
1987	Broadway	Royale Theatre	George Abbott	Broadway New York City
1987	Broadway	Great Lakes Shakespeare Festival	George Abbott	Cleveland, Ohio
1987	The Boys From Syracuse	Great Lakes Shakespeare Festival	Gerald Freedman	Cleveland, Ohio
1986	Pump Boys and Dinettes	Geva Theatre Center	Jon Glazer	Rochester, NY
1985-1986	Forbidden Broadway	Omni Shoreham Hotel Marquis Room	Jan Neuberger, Gerard Alessandrini	Washington, DC
1985	Godspell	Ford's Theater	David Bell	Washington, DC
1985	They're Playing Our Song	Downtown Cabaret Theatre	Richard Sabellico	Bridgeport, CT
1984	The Three Musketeers	Broadway Theatre (53rd Street)	Joe Layton	Broadway New York City
1984	Meet Me In St. Louis	Darien Dinner Theatre	Dennis Cole	Darien, CT
1984	Comedy of Errors	Equity Library Theater	Kent Thompson	Off-Broadway New York City
1983	Wanted Dead Or Alive	Panache Cabaret	Chapman Roberts	Off-Broadway New York City
1983	La Chanteuse Extraordinaire	Le Ragtime	Bart Taylor	Cannes, France
1983	The Stronger - Workshop	Middlesex College Theater	Bobby LuPone, Bernie Telsey	Edison, NJ
1983	The Men's Group	Equity Library Theater	Kent Thompson	Off-Broadway New York City
1982	American Princess	INTAR Theatre	Jed Feuer	Off-Broadway New York City
1981	Annie	Uris Theatre	Martin Charnin	Broadway New York City
1980	Annie	2nd National Tour	Martin Charnin	Broadway National Tour
1980	Anyone Can Whistle	Berkshire Theatre Festival	Robert Tucker	Stockbridge, MA
1980	A Funny Thing Happened on the Way to the Forum	Equity Library Theater	Cash Baxter	Off-Broadway New York City

== See also ==
- Guiding Light
- Victoires de la Musique
- Helen Hayes Awards
