= Larry Carpenter =

American theatre and television director and producer

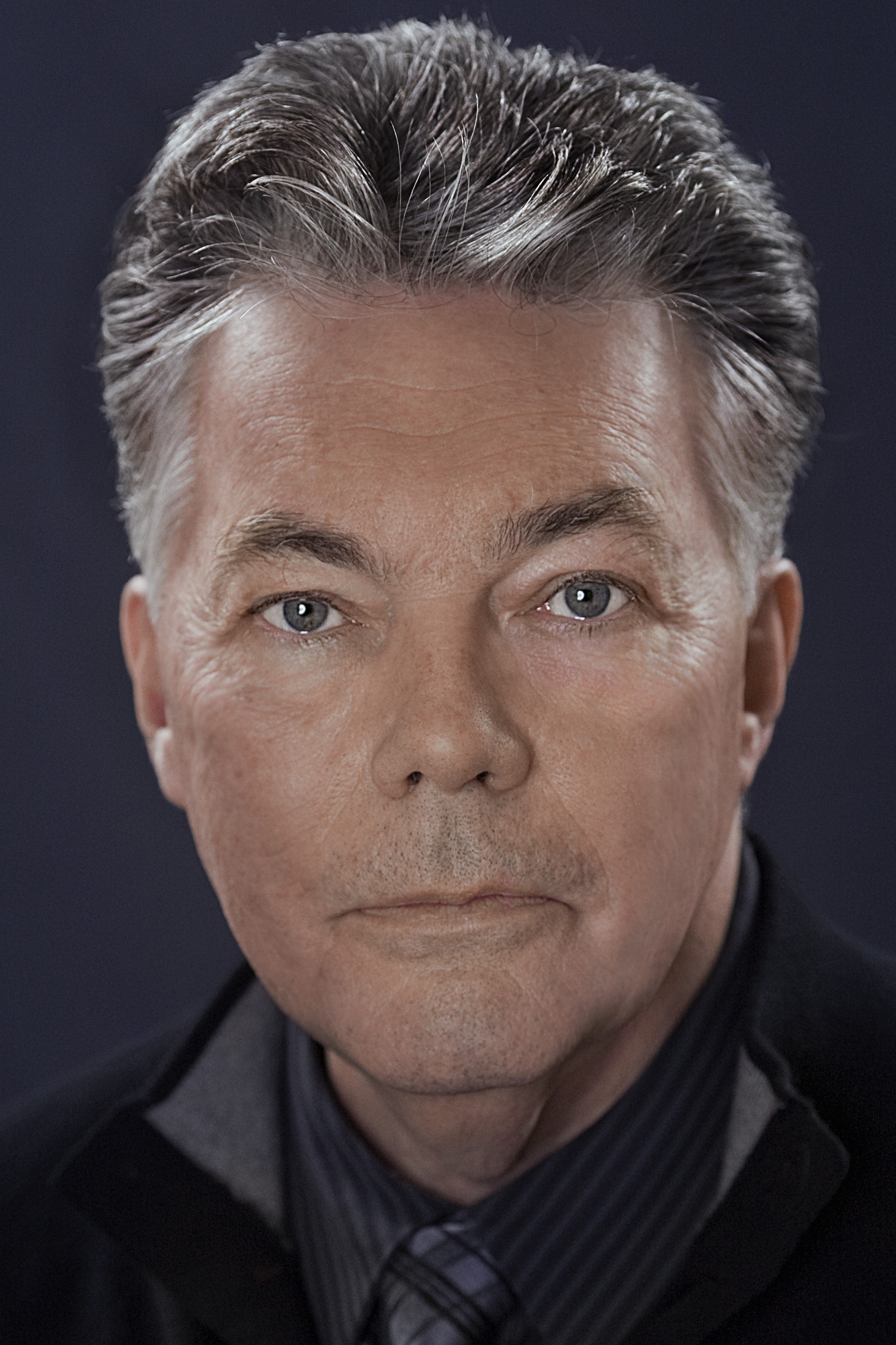
- Larry Carpenter, about 2017
- Born: August 12, 1948 (age 78); Brockport, New York, U.S.
- Occupations: Director, producer

Larry Carpenter (born August 12, 1948) is an American theatre and television director and producer. In the theatre, he has worked as an artistic director, associate artistic director, a managing director and general manager in both the New York and Regional arenas. He also works as a theatre director and is known primarily for large projects, working on musicals and classical plays equally. In television, he works as a director for New York daytime dramas. He has served as executive vice president of the Stage Directors and Choreographers Society, the national labor union for professional stage directors and choreographers. He is also a member of the Directors Guild of America PAC.

== Biography ==
=== Early life and career ===
Born and raised in Brockport, New York, Carpenter became involved in the theatre at age 12. In his hometown, SUNY Brockport offered a Theatre Arts major and produced a semi-professional summer theatre where he worked as a backstage hand and as a young actor with such touring stars as Peggy Wood, Ann Harding, John Kerr and Leo G. Carroll. He enrolled in Boston University's School of Fine and Applied Arts as an undergraduate designer and director. He graduated as a director and actor and spent the next several years acting, singing and dancing with the Oregon and San Diego Shakespeare Festivals, the American Conservatory Theater in San Francisco and with the American Shakespeare Theatre in Stratford, Connecticut.

=== Artistic management and theatre direction ===
At Stratford, and subsequently at the McCarter Theatre in Princeton, New Jersey, he became the associate artistic director to Michael Kahn. He also met and married his wife Julia MacKenzie.

From Stratford, Carpenter moved to New York to become managing director of Garland Wright's Lion Theatre Company; and then general manager of the Harold Clurman Theatre. He also continued to direct. At the Lion he directed Charles Nolte's A Night at the Black Pig and J.M. Barry's Mary Rose – while also sharing directing duties with Wright for the subsequent iterations of Jack Heifner's Vanities. For Playwrights' Horizons he directed Martin Sherman's Cracks, The Mousetrap, and Anything Goes! He also served as Gower Champion's associate director for his Broadway productions of Rockabye Hamlet, A Broadway Musical, The Act with Liza Minnelli, and 42nd Street.

For the next eight years, while continuing to work as a freelance director, Carpenter served as the artistic director of the American Stage Festival in Milford, NH. Of ASF's forty-five productions of revivals and new work, five productions were subsequently transferred to Broadway. Most notable are two productions directed by Carpenter: Ken Ludwig's Lend Me a Tenor and Barry Keating's Starmites! For this last, Carpenter received a Tony Award nomination.

Returning to New York, Carpenter directed the Roundabout Theatre Company productions of The Doctor's Dilemma, Light Up The Sky and Privates on Parade—this latter starring Jim Dale, Donna Murphy, and Simon Jones. Privates on Parade received the New York Drama Critics' Circle Award for Best Foreign Play. He then directed Lady in the Dark for City Center Encores! and the world premiere of Preston Sturges' A Cup of Coffee at SoHo Rep. He also served as associate artistic director for the Berkshire Theatre Festival.

=== Television and theatre direction ===
Carpenter then combined his theatre career with television to become a director of daytime drama. His award-winning body of work includes experience with multiple and single camera formats—with the edit suite and with live-broadcast—in studio and on location. He has directed the daytime drama As the World Turns, winning his first Daytime Emmy Award. After brief stints with Guiding Light and All My Children, he joined ABC's One Life to Live and then General Hospital. There he's received four DGA Awards and, together with the OLTL and GH DGA teams, four additional Emmys. Throughout, he has continued to work as a theatre director, working with the Huntington Theatre Company, Seattle Rep, Goodspeed Opera House, Kansas City Repertory—the American Conservatory, Alliance, Pioneer and Walnut Street theatres—and in Los Angeles, the Pasadena Playhouse, Westwood Theatre, Musical Theatre West and La Mirada Theatre for the Performing Arts.

=== Adaptation ===
Carpenter's first adaptation of A Christmas Carol played many seasons at New England's Merrimack Regional and Nickerson theatres—and at the Citadel Theatre in Alberta and Iowa Stage Theatre Company. A second musical adaptation of A Christmas Carol played the Wilbur and Huntington theatres in Boston—starring Paul Benedict and then Clive Revill.

He wrote a new libretto for the Goodspeed Opera House production of Oscar Strauss's operetta The Chocolate Soldier. He also significant reworked Meredith Willson's Here's Love for Goodspeed Opera House; and Kiss Me, Kate for the Pioneer Theatre Company.

For the Huntington Theatre Company he adapted and directed Ostrovsky's Diary of a Scoundrel and Feydeau's The Lady from Maxim's. He created a new version of Dion Boucicault's The Shaughraun; for the Huntington and Seattle Repertory theatres; and he adapted The Captain of Koepnick for the Huntington and ACT, San Francisco.

Carpenter's adaptation of Dickens' A Tale of Two Cities played at both American Stage Festival and the Asolo Repertory Theatre in Sarasota, FL.

=== Educator ===
Carpenter has taught and directed performance projects at the Juilliard School: Theatre Division; New York University: Tisch School of the Arts; American Conservatory Theater Training Program; SUNY Purchase School of Theatre; Rutgers University: Mason Gross School of the Arts; and Marymount Manhattan College.

== Awards and nominations ==
Tony Award

- Nominated, 1999, Best Direction of a Musical, Starmites!

New York Drama Critics' Circle

- Won, 1990 Award Best Foreign Play, Privates on Parade, Roundabout Theatre

Independent Reviewers of New England

- Won, 1999, Best Direction, The Mikado, The Huntington Theatre Company

Directors Guild of America Award

- Won, 2010, Best Direction: Daytime, One Life to Live
- Won, 2008, Best Direction: Daytime, One Life to Live
- Won, 2007, Best Direction: Daytime, One Life to Live
- Nominated, 2006, Best Direction: Daytime, One Life to Live
- Nominated, 2005, Best Direction: Daytime, One Life to Live
- Won, 2003, Best Direction: Daytime, One Life to Live
- Nominated, 2002, Best Direction: Daytime, One Life to Live

Daytime Emmy Award

- Won, 2016, Directing Team, General Hospital
- Won, 2015, Directing Team, General Hospital
- Nominated, 2010, Directing Team, One Life to Live
- Won, 2009, Directing Team, One Life to Live
- Won, 2008, Directing Team, One Life to Live
- Nominated, 2004, Directing Team, One Life to Live
- Nominated, 2001, Directing Team, As the World Turns
- Nominated, 2000, Directing Team, As the World Turns
- Nominated, 1995, Directing Team, As the World Turns
- Won, 1993, Directing Team, As the World Turns

== Education ==
In 2002, Carpenter completed his master's degree in 19th Century British Theatre at New York University. Previously, he received the Bob Hope Scholarship for graduate study at Southern Methodist University's Meadows School of the Arts MFA Theatre program. He received his BFA from Boston University School of Fine Arts, where he graduated cum laude as the Harold C. Case Scholar. He has attended many workshops and seminars, the most extensive of which was a semester long FEDAPT program: "Producing for the Professional Theatre."
