= Chester Weinberg =

American fashion designer

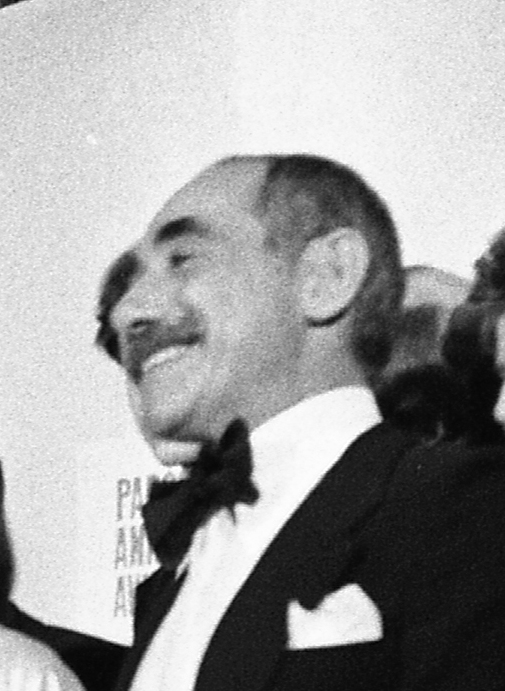
Chester Weinberg in 1976

Chester Weinberg (1930–1985) was an American fashion designer. While he was very highly regarded for his design work in the 1960s and early 1970s, he is now mainly known for being the fashion industry's first high-profile AIDS-related death.

== Early life and education ==
Chester Weinberg was born in New York on 30 September 1930. He was Jewish.

Weinberg graduated from Parsons in 1951, and between 1955 and 1985 regularly returned to the school as a guest lecturer and visiting critic. He also taught at the Art Institute of Chicago.

== Career ==
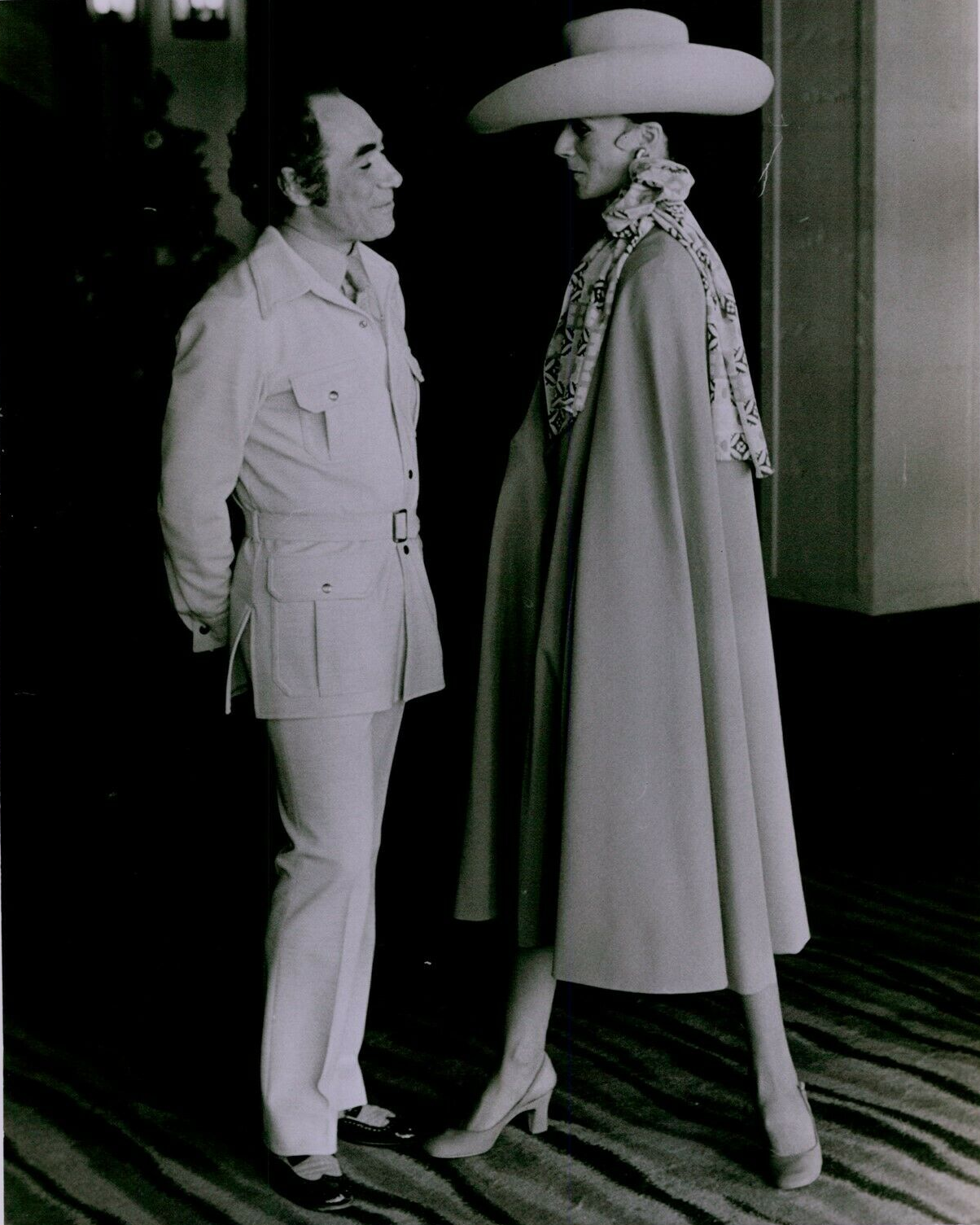
Chester Weinberg with model, 1971

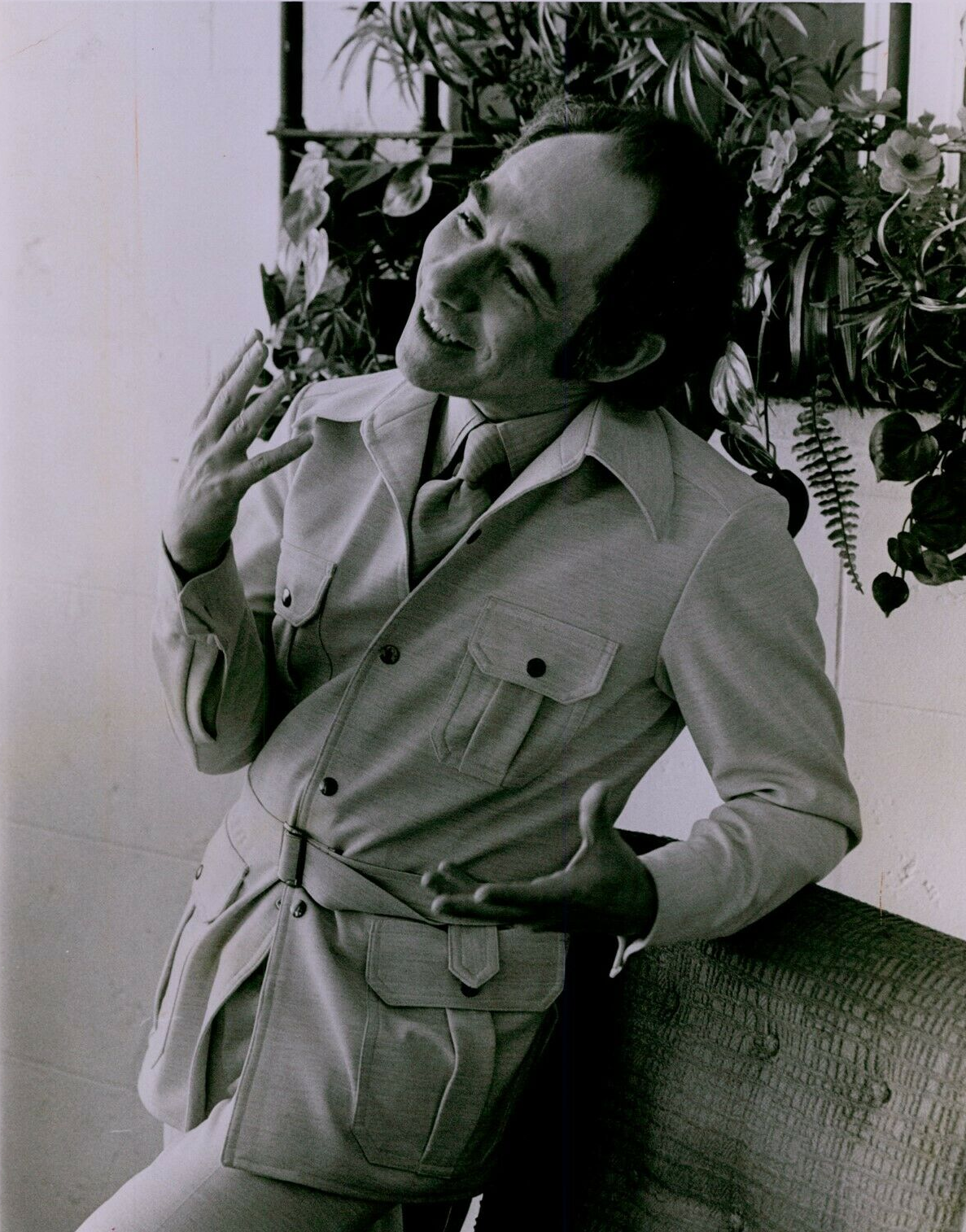
Chester Weinberg in a safari suit, January 1971

After spending the 1950s and early 1960s working for various Seventh Avenue clothing houses, Weinberg launched his own label in 1966, which ran until 1975.

In her 2015 memoir Betty Halbreich remembered Weinberg as being "ahead of his time", as well as designing in suede and with dramatic prints. Weinberg was one of the designers who actively championed the midi skirt in the face of opposition from American buyers and retailers.

By 1970, the year that he won a Coty Award, Chester Weinberg was seen as one of the most important designers on Seventh Avenue, equivalent to Bill Blass or Geoffrey Beene. He gave Bethann Hardison her modelling debut. Despite the hostility of the audience towards Hardison's Blackness, Weinberg was supportive of her and she remembered it as an empowering and groundbreaking experience.

After the closure of his label in 1975, Weinberg worked freelance, creating cashmere knitwear for Ballantyne of Scotland, dress patterns for Butterick and Vogue, and dance costumes for Twyla Tharp's ballet As Time Goes By. In 1978 Weinberg joined Calvin Klein as a consultant, and in 1981 became design director for Calvin Klein Jeans. Weinberg had been one of Klein's heroes as a young designer, and the two men developed a strong friendship and working relationship. Weinberg recruited several design assistants for Klein, including Charles Suppon and Jeffrey Banks who went on to create the Klein logo shirts. After Weinberg was diagnosed with AIDS, Klein fired him.

While lecturing at Parsons, Weinberg mentored designers such as Isaac Mizrahi, Marc Jacobs, and Donna Karan. Karan, whose academic record was underwhelming, was accepted into Parsons on Weinberg's recommendation as her mother was his employee.

== Personal life and death ==
Chester Weinberg was gay, although until his label closed in 1975, he was firmly closeted and refused to acknowledge his sexuality.

He died of AIDS on 24 April 1985, aged 54, making him the first high-profile fashion designer known to die of the disease. As Weinberg was no longer the household name he had been in the 1960s and early 1970s, the fashion industry actively moved to erase him from history. Until 1990, when Halston publicly acknowledged that he was dying of AIDS, the majority of AIDS-related fashion deaths typically went unacknowledged, or were attributed to other causes in order to protect a designer or brand's reputation and value (the New York Times obituary stated that Weinberg died of encephalitis). Weinberg almost completely disappeared from writings about the fashion industry, the main scholarly acknowledgement of him being a few brief passages in the curator Richard Martin's 1995 encyclopedic work Contemporary Fashion.

Despite the attempts to downplay Weinberg's significance after his death, Calvin Klein placed a full-page memorial in ad space in Women’s Wear Daily, and endowed a Chester A. Weinberg Memorial scholarship fund at Parsons. When the AIDS Quilt was created, Weinberg was included in the panel commemorating Calvin Klein employees.
