= Legs Diamond (musical) =

1988 Broadway musical

- Original Cast Album
- Music: Peter Allen
- Lyrics: Peter Allen
- Book: Harvey Fierstein; Charles Suppon
- Basis: The Rise and Fall of Legs Diamond by Joseph Landon
- Productions: 1988 Broadway

Legs Diamond is a musical with a book by Harvey Fierstein and Charles Suppon based on the Warner Brothers film The Rise and Fall of Legs Diamond (1960), with a screenplay by Joseph Landon. The music and lyrics are by Peter Allen, who starred as the title character in the Broadway production.

The "Almost Totally Fictitious Musical Hystery" [sic] of Legs Diamond follows the travails of its title character, a Depression-era mobster who wants to break into show business.

== Production ==
The musical opened on Broadway at the Mark Hellinger Theatre on December 26, 1988 and closed on February 19, 1989 after 64 performances and 72 previews (far more than the usual 16-24 preview periods). Directed by Robert Allan Ackerman with choreography by Alan Johnson, the scenic design was by David Mitchell, costume design by Willa Kim, and lighting design by Jules Fisher and Peggy Eisenhauer (Associate). The cast included Peter Allen (Jack Diamond), Julie Wilson (Flo), Randall Edwards (Kiki Roberts), Brenda Braxton (Madge), Joe Silver (Arnold Rothstein), Jim Fyfe (Moran), Christian Kauffmann (Bones), Pat McNamara (Devane), and Raymond Serra (Augie), Jonathan Cerullo (Tango Dancer).

The reviews were unanimously negative, with particular disbelief at Peter Allen's attempts to play so totally against type as a suave lothario. Frank Rich commented that the evening's most compelling drama was watching Allen figure out "what to do with his hands". The failure of the musical was so total that it compelled the Nederlander Organization to finally sell the beloved but flop-prone Mark Hellinger Theatre to the Times Square Church, which still owns it.

On Sunday, December 3, 2017, Legs Diamond celebrated its 30th anniversary with a reunion concert at Feinstein's/54 Below, and many of the original cast members reunited to perform. It was directed and produced by original cast member Jonathan Stuart Cerullo and starred Christine Andreas, Brenda Braxton, Randall Edwards, and Bob Stillman.

== Song list ==
Act One

- Prelude/When I Get My Name in Lights - Orchestra, Jack, Ensemble
- Speakeasy - Madge, Ensemble
- Applause - Flo, The Hotsy Totsy Girls
- Knockers - Jack, The Hotsy Totsy Girls
- I Was Made for Champagne – Kiki, The Tropicabana Dancers
- Tropican Rhumba – Jack, Kiki
- Sure Thing Baby – Jack
- Speakeasy Christmas – The Hotsy Totsy Girls
- Charge It to A. R. – Augie, Bones, Moran, A. R., A.R.'s Gang
- Only an Older Woman – Jack, Flo
- Taxi Dancers' Tango – Jack, Ensemble
- Only Steal from Thieves – Jack, Kiki
- When I Get My Name in Lights (reprise) – Jack, Company

Act Two

- Cut of the Cards – Jack, Company
- Gangland Chase – Orchestra
- Now You See Me, Now You Don't – Jack, Kiki, Ensemble
- The Man Nobody Could Love – Kiki, Flo, Madge
- The Music Went Out of My Life – Flo
- Say It Isn't So – Jack, Company
- Say It Isn't So (reprise) – Ensemble
- All I Wanted Was the Dream – Jack
- Finale – Jack, Flo, Company

"Come Save Me", a song cut from the show, had been recorded by Allen and Niki Gregoroff on one of Allen's albums in 1985. It also was included in The Boy from Oz, a musical about Allen.

== Awards and nominations ==
=== Original Broadway production ===
Year	Award	Category	Nominee	Result
1989	Tony Awards	Best Performance by a Featured Actress in a Musical	Julie Wilson	Nominated
1989	Tony Awards	Best Choreography	Alan Johnson	Nominated
1989	Tony Awards	Best Costume Design	Willa Kim	Nominated
1989	Drama Desk Award	Outstanding Costume Design	Willa Kim	Nominated

== Discography ==
The original Broadway cast recording was released by RCA Victor (RCA Victor 7983-2-RC), and it now is out of print. The most famous song "When I Get My Name in Lights" was re-done by Allen and his friend Harry Connick, Jr. on Allen's last album Making Every Moment Count. It also was included in the stage musical "The Boy from Oz," where it’s sung by the young Peter.

Standard Edition

1. Peter Allen - "Prelude/When I Get My Name in Lights" (4:56)
2. Brenda Braxton - Speakeasy" (4:11)
3. Julie Wilson & Peter Allen - "Applause/Knockers" (5:41)
4. Randall Edwards - "I Was Made for Champagne" (5:07)
5. Peter Allen - "Sure Thing Baby" (3:58)
6. Carol Ann Baxter, Colleen Dunn, Deanna Dys, Gwendolyn Miller & Wendy Waring - "Speakeasy Christmas" (0:44)
7. Raymond Serra, Christian Kauffmann, Jim Fyfe & Joe Silver - "Charge It to A.R." (2:21)
8. Peter Allen & Julie Wilson - "Only an Older Woman" (3:39)
9. Peter Allen & Randall Edwards - "Only Steal from Thieves" (3:28)
10. Peter Allen - "When I Get My Name in Lights (Reprise)" (1:42)
11. Peter Allen - "Cut of the Cards" (2:25)
12. "Gangland Chase (Instrumental)" (3:40)
13. Peter Allen & Randall Edwards - "Now You See Me, Now You Don't" (3:37)
14. Randall Edwards, Julie Wilson & Brenda Braxton - "The Man Nobody Could Love" (4:25)
15. Julie Wilson - "The Music Went Out of My Life" (4:40)
16. Peter Allen - "Say It Isn't So" (4:46)
17. Legs Diamond Original Broadway Cast - "Say It Isn't So (Reprise)" (1:12)
18. Peter Allen - "All I Wanted Was the Dream" (2:58)
19. Peter Allen & Julie Wilson - "Finale" (1:43)
