= Charles Suppon =

American fashion designer

Charles Suppon in 1976

Charles Suppon (1949-1989) was an American fashion designer.

Suppon was born in Collinsville, Illinois in 1949, and studied in Chicago. He came to New York and began working for Calvin Klein as an assistant on the recommendation of Chester Weinberg, before leaving in 1976 to work for Intre Sport. He designed both menswear and womenswear, specializing in sporty clothes such as easy-fitting dresses and men's mohair sweatsuits. Suppon debuted his solo womenswear collections in 1977, booking over $1 million in orders for the Spring collection and over $5 million for the Fall 1977 collection. The following year he was one of two winners of the 1978 womenswear Coty Award alongside Bill Atkinson. In 1979, he began creating performance costumes for Peter Allen, starting with the one-man revue Up in One.

In 1984, Suppon left fashion to act as Allen's personal manager and collaborator on the musical Legs Diamond, which eventually opened after many delays on Broadway in 1988. Suppon also co-authored, with Harvey Fierstein, the book of the musical. Allen and Suppon worked on the project in Australia before bringing their outline and songs back to Allen's talent manager Dee Anthony, who had harsh words to say about the involvement of a "fashion designer from Brooklyn" in writing a musical, and showed his work to Bob Fosse who was also deeply critical. The musical, the only one Suppon worked on, failed to be critically well-received, and closed after 64 performances. The critic John Simon commented in New York Magazine in January 1989 that perhaps the main reason to remember it would be for being the only musical whose book had been "co-scripted by a ready-to-wear designer."

By the time Legs Diamond was in production, Suppon had been getting sicker and sicker, and in March 1989, he died at home in Manhattan. United Press International reported the cause of death as a brain tumour, while Suppon and Allen's assistant, Bruce Cudd, told The New York Times it was lesions on the brain. In 2021, the designer Louis Dell'Olio, who jointly won the 1977 Coty with Donna Karan, and with her, had been a close friend and contemporary of Suppon, stated that his death was AIDS-related.

Some of Suppon's archives from his time at Intre Sport are held by The New School.
