= Brenda Braxton =

American actress

- Born: August 7, 1956 (age 69); Bronx, New York City, U.S.
- Education: High School of Performing Arts
- Occupation: Actress
- Years active: 1976–present
- Spouse: Anthony Van Putten

Brenda Braxton (born August 7, 1956) is an American actress, singer, choreographer and stage director. She is best known for her performances on Broadway musicals. She received a Tony Award nomination for Best Featured Actress in a Musical for her performance in Smokey Joe's Cafe (1995). Braxton also received an NAACP Theatre Award, a Jefferson Award and a Grammy Award.

== Life and career ==
Braxton was born and raised in Bronx, New York City and graduated from the High School of Performing Arts. She made her Broadway debut appearing as a replacement in the 1976-77 musical Guys and Dolls and later performed in But Never Jam Today, Reggae, Lena Horne: The Lady and Her Music, Dreamgirls, Cats, Legs Diamond, and Jelly's Last Jam. She made her screen debut appearing opposite Cleavant Derricks in the 1979 PBS filmed musical production of When Hell Freezes Over, I'll Skate. In 1981 she appeared in the television adaptation of Purlie.

In 1995, Braxton received a Tony Award nomination for Best Featured Actress in a Musical for her performance in the Broadway musical Smokey Joe's Cafe. She was choreographer and director for 2001 and 2007 productions of Dreamgirls. In 2003, Braxton went to play Velma Kelly in Chicago. With an eight-time stint in the role, Braxton holds the record for having played 'Velma Kelly' on Broadway more than any other actress in the show's history with over 1,200 performances.

On television, Braxton guest-starred in The Cosby Show, Third Watch, Smash and Nurse Jackie. From 2019 to 2022, she had a recurring role as Madeline Gilford in the legal drama series, The Good Fight.

Braxton married fitness trainer Anthony Van Putten, as of 2006 they own a men's grooming salon in Harlem.
