= Political Action Committee of the Directors Guild of America =

The Political Action Committee of the Directors Guild of America (or DGA-PAC) is a United States based political action committee of the Directors Guild of America.

The DGA-PAC lobbies mainly for freedom of speech and First Amendment of the United States issues, piracy and copyright infringement, and against media consolidation. It also promotes filmmaking within the borders of the United States, and lobbies for tax breaks on both the federal and state level to keep film production within U.S. borders.

The DGA actively addresses critical issues such as copyright protection in the digital age, safeguarding First Amendment rights for the creative community, combating runaway production, and reviewing policies affecting the DGA Health and Pension Plans. Through its political action committee (PAC) and leadership council, the DGA engages with legislators and policymakers to advocate for the needs and concerns of directors and their teams.

Director Taylor Hackford is the current chairman for the DGA-PAC.
