= Starmites =

- Original logo
- Music: Barry Keating
- Lyrics: Barry Keating
- Book: Stuart Ross; Barry Keating
- Productions: 1987 Off-Broadway; 1988 American Stage Festival; 1989 Broadway

Starmites is a musical with music and lyrics by Barry Keating and a book by Stuart Ross and Barry Keating. It was first presented in 1980 off-off-Broadway by the Ark Theatre Company. It opened off-Broadway in 1987 and on-Broadway on April 27, 1989, where it ran for 60 performances. It received six nominations at the 43rd Tony Awards, including Best Musical, and won zero.

== Plot ==
Eleanor, a shy teenager from the 80s, creates and explores a dream world (Innerspace) featuring various fictional characters and settings pulled from her large sci-fi comic book collection. The bulk of the show follows Eleanor's self-insert character Milady and her misadventures with the Starmites, a troupe of spacefaring rogues that are portrayed as an old school boy band.

== History ==
Starmites was staged off-Broadway by Musical Theater Works at the CSC Theater in 1987, with staging by Mark Herko. It featured Liz Larsen, Gabriel Barre, Steve Watkins, and Sharon McNight. It was staged in Milford, New Hampshire at the now-defunct American Stage Festival, August 10–27, 1988. That staging was directed by Larry Carpenter, and featured Liz Larsen and Sharon McNight, all of whom would remain with the show when it opened on Broadway at Criterion Center Stage Right on April 27, 1989 and closed on June 18, 1989 after 60 performances and 35 previews. Directed and staged by Larry Carpenter with choreography by Michele Assaf, it featured Liz Larsen as Eleanor and Bizarbara, Gabriel Barre as Trinkulus, Brian Lane Green as Spacepunk, and Sharon McNight as Diva and Eleanor's mother.

There are three versions of Starmites available through publisher Samuel French for amateur and professional performance: Starmites Lite, a junior version of Starmites, intended for grade school and middle school performances; Starmites High School; and Starmites Pro, intended for professional-level performance.

== Recording ==
A recording featuring members of the original Broadway cast was released on April 27, 1999 on the Original Cast Record label (ASIN: B00000GBYT).

== Songs ==
Act I

- "Innerspace Callin’" - Spacepunk, Starmites, Eleanor
- "Superhero Girl" - Eleanor
- "I Want My Cruelty Back” - Shak Graa
- "Starmites" - Starmites and Spacepunk
- "Trink's Narration" - Trinkulus and Starmites
- "Afraid of the Dark" - Spacepunk, Starmites, Eleanor, and Trinkulus
- "Little Hero" - Eleanor
- "Attack of Banshees" - Banshees
  - “Ravenous” (Alternate) - Banshees
- "Hard to be a Diva" - Diva and Banshees
- "Hard to be a Diva Reprise" - Diva and Banshees
- "Love Duet" - Spacepunk and Eleanor
- "The Dance of Spousal Arousal" - Banshees and Bizarbara
- "Finaletto" - Company

Act II

- "Entre'acte" - Band
- "Bizarbara's Wedding" - Bizarbara and Banshees
- "Milady" - Spacepunk and Starmites
- "Beauty Within" - Diva and Bizarbara
- "The Cruelty Stomp" - Trinkulus and Company
- "Reach Right Down" - Starmites, Diva, and Banshees
- "Immolation" - Eleanor, Shak Graa, and Spacepunk
- "Starmites/Diva (Reprise)" - Diva, Starmites, and Banshees
- "Finale" - Company

== Awards and nominations ==
=== Original Broadway production ===
Year	Award	Category	Nominee	Result
1989	Tony Award	Best Musical		Nominated
1989	Tony Award	Best Performance by a Leading Actor in a Musical	Gabriel Barre	Nominated
1989	Tony Award	Best Performance by a Leading Actor in a Musical	Brian Lane Green	Nominated
1989	Tony Award	Best Performance by a Leading Actress in a Musical	Sharon McNight	Nominated
1989	Tony Award	Best Direction of a Musical	Larry Carpenter	Nominated
1989	Tony Award	Best Choreography	Michele Assaf	Nominated
1989	Theatre World Award		Sharon McNight	Won

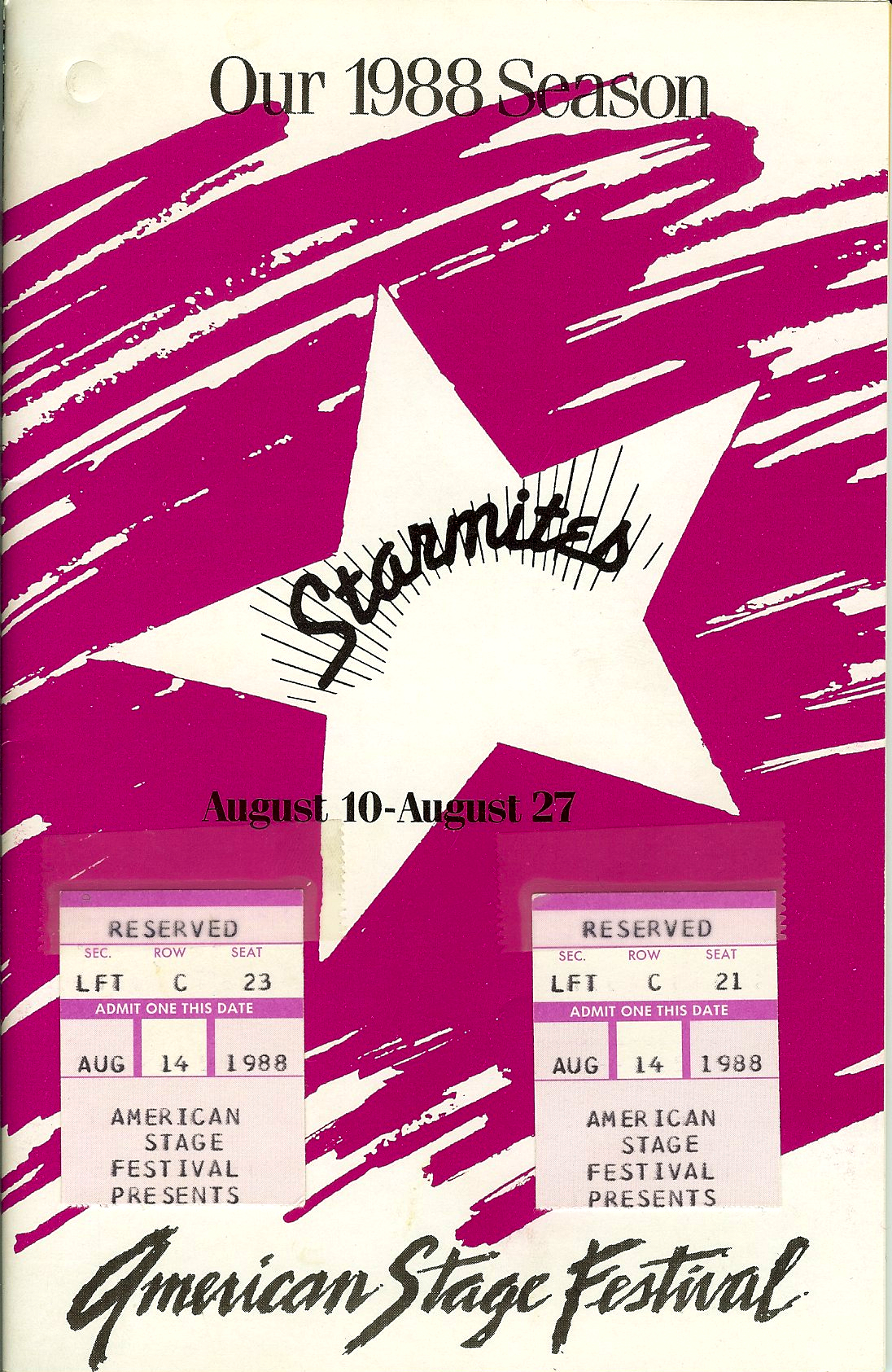
1988 program
