= Harriet V. Kuhnlein =

Harriet V. Kuhnlein is Professor Emerita of Human Nutrition at McGill University in Montreal, CA. She is an author, scholar, and is also the founding director of the Centre for Indigenous Peoples' Nutrition and Environment (CINE).

Beginning in 1974 with the Hopi, Kuhnlein has worked in partnership with Indigenous Peoples to document and preserve traditional food systems and their vital connection to nutrition, health and well-being. Her work has extended to the Coast Salish of Western North America, Haudenosaunee in Quebec, and more than 40 cultural communities across the United States, Canada and other parts of the world.

Kuhnlein has led research and published more than 400 articles, books, and abstracts. In partnership with the Food and Agriculture Organization of the United Nations (FAO), she has contributed to international studies documenting Indigenous Peoples' traditional food knowledge.

== Education ==
Harriet V. Kuhnlein
- Citizenship: USA, Canada, Switzerland
- Occupation: Professor

Academic work
- Main interests: Traditional food systems of Indigenous Peoples, nutrition, and the environment of Indigenous Peoples.
- Notable works: Centre for Indigenous Peoples’ Nutrition and Environment (CINE), McGill University - Founding Director, 1992 - current

B.Sc. Foods and Nutrition, Pennsylvania State University, 1961

M.Sc. Foods and Nutrition, Oregon State University, 1969. Supervisor: L. Miller, Thesis: The Determination of Taurine in Human Blood.

Ph.D. Nutritional Sciences. University of California, Berkeley, 1976. Supervisor: D. Calloway. Thesis: Strontium and Lead in the Hopi Nutritional Environment and Teeth.

Dietitian - American Dietetic Association, 1974-current

College of Dietitians of Ontario, 1996-2007

Ordre professionnel des diététistes du Québec, 2007-2009

Certificate International Food and Nutrition Policy, Massachusetts Institute of Technology, 1980

Honorary LL.D. from University of Western Ontario.

== Professional Career ==
- McGill University, Professor Emerita, 2009-current
- Department of Public Health Sciences, University of Hawaii, Adjunct Professor, 2016
- School of Human Nutrition, McGill University, Professor, 1986 - 2008
- Faculty of Medicine, Dept. of Medicine, McGill University, Professor, 1986 - 2008
- Centre for Indigenous Peoples’ Nutrition and Environment (CINE), McGill University, Founding Director, 1992 - current
- McGill School of Environment, McGill University, Associate Member, 2006 - current
- School of Dietetics and Human Nutrition, McGill University, Director, 1985 - 1992
- School of Family and Nutritional of Sciences, University of British Columbia, Associate Professor of Nutrition, 1983 - 85
- School of Family and Nutritional of Sciences, University of British Columbia, Assistant Professor of Nutrition, 1976 - 1982
- Department of Nutritional Sciences, University of California, Berkeley, NIH Trainee, 1973 - 1976
- Institute of Molecular Biology, University of Oregon, Research Assistant, 1969 - 1972
- University of Oregon, Lecturer in Foods, 1970 - 1971
- Oregon State University, Teaching Assistant, 1967 - 1968
- Tulane University and Universidad del Valle, Cali, Colombia, Fellow, International Center for Medical Research and Training, 1967
- Sacred Heart Hospital, Eugene, Oregon, Clinical Dietitian, 1962 - 1966
- Pennsylvania State University, Food Service Supervisor, 1961 - 1962

International Union of Nutritional Sciences (IUNS), Canadian representative to Committee II/6 (Nutrition and Anthropology), - Co-chair of the Committee. Project: Community Assessment of Natural Food Sources of Vitamin A. Field work in Philippines, India, China, Niger, Peru.

IUNS Task Force on Traditional, Indigenous, and Cultural Food and Nutrition, Chair 2009 – 2013; Co-Chair 2014- 2017; Member 2018-2021

TIFSaN: Traditional and Indigenous Food Systems and Nutrition: Member 2021-2025

Task Force on Indigenous Peoples’ Food Sovereignty, Nutrition and Wellbeing: Member 2025-2029.

FAO Expert Consultation on Biodiversity Indicators for Nutrition, 2008 - 2017.

World Public Health Nutrition Association, Elected Council Member. 2008 – 2012.

Advisory Board, The Indigenous Partnership, 2022 - current

Indigenous Advisory Board, Centre for Indigenous Peoples’ Nutrition and Environment, 2025 - current

Food and Agriculture Organization Global Hub on Indigenous Peoples’ Food and Knowledge Systems. Panel of Experts.

== Publications ==
Kuhnlein HV and NJ Turner. 1991. Traditional Plant Foods of Canadian Indigenous Peoples. Nutrition, Botany and Use. Gordon and Breach Science Publishers 1991. Reprinted by Routledge Revivals, 2020

Kuhnlein HV, B Erasmus and D Spigelski. (2009) Indigenous Peoples’ Food Systems: The Many Dimensions of Culture, Diversity and Environment for Nutrition and Health. United Nations Food and Agriculture Organization

Kuhnlein HV, B Erasmus, D. Spigelski and B Burlingame (2013) Indigenous Peoples’ Food Systems and Well-being: Interventions and Policies for Healthy Communities. 398 pp. United Nations Food and Agriculture Organization, Rome

Kuhnlein HV and MM Humphries (2017). Traditional Animal Foods of Indigenous Peoples of Northern North America. The contributions of wildlife diversity to the subsistence and nutrition of Indigenous cultures.

Kuhnlein HV and GH Pelto, editors (1997). Culture, Environment, and Food to Prevent Vitamin A Deficiency. IDRC and INFDC.

McCune LM, V Nuvayestewa and HV Kuhnlein. (2019) Why and how to document the traditional food system in your community: Report from breakout discussions at the 2017 Native American Nutrition Conference. Current Developments in Nutrition Vol 3, Issue Supplement 2: 19-24.

Food system sustainability for health and well-being of Indigenous Peoples. Kuhnlein HV. Public Health Nutr. 2015 Sep;18 (13):2415-24. doi: 10.1017/S1368980014002961. Epub 2014 Dec 19.PMID: 25522932 Free PMC article.

Dietary change and traditional food systems of Indigenous Peoples. Kuhnlein HV, Receveur O. Annu Rev Nutr. 1996;16:417-42. doi: 10.1146/annurev.nu.16.070196.002221.PMID: 8839933 Review.

Environment and contaminants in traditional food systems of northern indigenous peoples. Kuhnlein HV, Chan HM. Annu Rev Nutr. 2000;20:595-626. doi: 10.1146/annurev.nutr.20.1.595.PMID: 10940347 Review.

Vitamin D intake by Indigenous Peoples in the Canadian Arctic. Kuhnlein HV. Public Health Nutr. 2018 Aug;21(11):1986-1987. doi: 10.1017/S1368980018000411.PMID: 30047358

Gender roles, food system biodiversity, and food security in Indigenous Peoples' communities. Kuhnlein HV. Matern Child Nutr. 2017 Nov;13 Suppl 3(Suppl 3):e12529. doi: 10.1111/mcn.12529.PMID: 29359432

Unique patterns of dietary adequacy in three cultures of Canadian Arctic indigenous peoples. Kuhnlein HV, Receveur O, Soueida R, Berti PR. Public Health Nutr. 2008 Apr;11(4):349-60. doi: 10.1017/S1368980007000353. Epub 2007 Jul 5.PMID: 1761075325

Arctic indigenous peoples experience the nutrition transition with changing dietary patterns and obesity. Kuhnlein HV, Receveur O, Soueida R, Egeland GM.J Nutr. 2004 Jun;134(6):1447-53. doi: 10.1093/jn/134.6.1447.PMID: 15173410

Dietary nutrient profiles of Canadian Baffin Island Inuit differ by food source, season, and age. Kuhnlein HV, Soueida R, Receveur O.J Am Diet Assoc. 1996 Feb;96(2):155-62. doi: 10.1016/S0002-8223(96)00045-4.PMID: 8557942

Local cultural animal food contributes high levels of nutrients for Arctic Canadian Indigenous adults and children. Kuhnlein HV, Receveur O.J Nutr. 2007 Apr;137(4):1110-4. doi: 10.1093/jn/137.4.1110.PMID: 17374689 Free article.

Karat, pulque, and gac: three shining stars in the traditional food galaxy. Kuhnlein HV. Nutr Rev. 2004 Nov;62(11):439-42. doi: 10.1111/j.1753-4887.2004.tb00015.x.PMID: 15622716 Review

Arctic indigenous women consume greater than acceptable levels of organochlorines. Kuhnlein HV, Receveur O, Muir DC, Chan HM, Soueida R.J Nutr. 1995 Oct;125(10):2501-10. doi: 10.1093/jn/125.10.2501.PMID: 7562084

Indigenous Peoples’ values and rights in food composition programmes: A call for agreed international guidelines. Burlingame B, Longvah T, Roy P, Kuhnlein H, Zavaleta-Cortijo C, Sultanbawa Y, Brunel A, Fernandez-de-Larrinoa Y. 2026 J Food Comp Anal. 159:221-235. doi:10.1016/j.jfca.2026.109557 .

== Awards ==
In 2024, Kuhnlein was awarded the Distinguished Ethnobiologist Award from the Society of Ethnobiology. Kuhnlein received the Unsung Heroes of McGill award in 2022. Also in 2022, she received the Living Legend Award from the International Union of Nutritional Sciences. In 2017 she was awarded Fulbright Specialist Award, the 2018 Alumni Award from the Pennsylvania State University, College of Health and Human Development and the 2024 and 2025 McGill University Bravo Honoree. She was the recipient of the Jack Hildes Medal for Circumpolar Health 2003, and became a Fellow of the International Union of Nutritional Sciences, 2009, and a Distinguished Fellow of the American Society of Nutrition, 2007.

== Personal Life ==
Kuhnlein retired from McGill University in 2009. She is married.
