= Molly Fowler =

Television producer

Molly Macklin Fowler is an American television producer and documentary filmmaker who reframed her investigative and story-telling skills as a mitigation specialist for criminal litigation.

She was executive producer of Red Darragh Films, LLC, and has been a supervising and co-executive producer for now-governor Wes Moore and his Omari Productions since 2011 when she was paired with Moore for his debut as series anchor for "ABC News Beyond Belief on OWN". Together they produced the PBS mini-series Coming Back with Wes Moore with a grant from The Corporation for Public Broadcasting for Omari and Powderhouse Productions in Somerville, MA. In 2018, she set up Justice-Partners, Inc. a 501c3 charity initially established to make socially relevant films, the first of which was Born To Be, the story of gender affirmation surgeon Jess Ting, M.D. which premiered at the 2019 New York Film Festival.

== Career ==
Fowler was hired out of the dramaturgy program at the Yale School of Drama to represent Warner Theatre Productions at the National Theatre of Great Britain in an early TV production deal. She remained in the U.K. as a theatre director where she received a Fringe First Award at the Edinburgh Festival for her production of Emily Mann’s “Still Life” at the Traverse Theatre, which was transferred to the Donmar Warehouse in London and subsequently to Riverside Studios in London. Fowler then served as a script advisor for Dustin Hoffman’s Punch Productions. She was Literary Manager for the Manhattan Theatre Club, and in 1984 reunited with Writer/Director Emily Mann for the Broadway production of political thriller Execution of Justice, which included cast members Wesley Snipes, Mary McDonnell, and Stanley Tucci alongside John Spencer as San Francisco City Supervisor Dan White in a drama that centers around the trial for the murder of Harvey Milk and George Moscone.

Fowler subsequently transitioned to television as a producer for Phil Donahue and as a booker for Diane Sawyer on ‘ABC News PrimeTime Live.” In 1995, Fowler joined ABC Daytime as Director of Development and served as a programming executive over ‘One Life to Live’ and ‘All My Children.’ In 2001, Fowler teamed with Producer Richard O’Regan in a joint venture between The New York Times and Granada Factual to produce World Birth Day, “World Birth Day Delivering Hope” and “World Wedding Day.” The three two-hour specials were the first productions co-funded by the Discovery International and broadcast on each of the Discovery networks around the world. Reviewed by Leslie Camhi for The New York Times, World Birth Day was described as “an ambitious and affecting two-hour documentary".

Fowler returned to the theatre to direct Yale classmate Anna Theresa Cascio’s "Broad Channel," which was produced for television by Scott Hornbacher after his exit from HBO’s The Sopranos.

She developed Benson Lee’s “Planet B-Boy” at Tribeca All Access in 2005. The film employed social media and became a cult hit at its debut at the 2007 Tribeca Film Festival in an outdoor screening sponsored by ESPN.

Fowler joined Point Made Films and produced and directed “In 500 Words or Less,” which examined the college application process in 2008. For Odyssey Networks, Fowler teamed with Forest Whitaker and his Significant Pictures as Executive Producer of “Serving Life,” living in a men's maximum security prison in Angola, Louisiana to document the story of 4 men learning to staff the hospice there, which was part of Oprah’s Doc Club on the premiere season for OWN.

Fowler produced nine live events for physicist Brian Greene at the 2011 World Science Festival. One of them, titled “Music and the Spark of Spontaneity,” was subsequently profiled by The New York Times.

She teamed with crime investigator John Walsh to produce “John Walsh Investigates: Abducted in the Heartland” for Lifetime TV before rejoining Wes Moore to make “Coming Back with Wes Moore”, which the Baltimore Sun reviewed: “At a time in American life when we are seeing reports of veterans dying while waiting months and even years for basic care at Veterans Affairs hospitals, this documentary about soldiers returning to civilian life after combat in Iraq and Afghanistan is timely and deeply touching."

Born to Be opened at the New York Film Festival.

== Personal life ==
She is the widow of attorney Jack Levine and has two daughters. She lives in New Orleans, Louisiana.
