= Bob Stillman =

American actor, singer, and songwriter (born 1954)

Bob Stillman (born December 2, 1954, in New York City) is an American actor, singer, and songwriter.

== Biography ==
Stillman studied piano at Juilliard, and composition at Princeton University.

He made his Broadway debut in Grand Hotel as Erik in 1989. He was a replacement cast member in Kiss of the Spider Woman. He played a songwriter Off-Broadway in The Last Session in 1997.

He performed as a pianist and actor in Broadway's Dirty Blonde (2000), and received a Tony Award nomination as Featured Actor in a Play.

He was a standby for the role of Cosmé McMoon in the Broadway production of Souvenir (2005). He performed in Souvenir at the Good Theater, Portland, Maine in November 2007. He appeared as George Gould Strong in Grey Gardens Off-Broadway (2006) and on Broadway (2006).

He appeared as "The Husband" in the Off-Broadway revival of Hello Again in 2011 and received a 2011 Drama Desk Award nomination, Outstanding Featured Actor in a Musical. He appeared in the Off-Broadway premiere of the Paula Vogel play A Civil War Christmas in November 2012, in the role of Abraham Lincoln.

He appeared in the Broadway production of Act One in 2014 as "Sam Harris" and was a standby in the Broadway productions of It's Only a Play (2014) and Living on Love (2015).

One of his songs, "Long Hard Day", was featured in the stage musical Urban Cowboy (2003).

=== Concerts ===
Stillman performs in concerts and cabaret. He performed his own songs at the Sh-K-Boom Room at the Cutting Room (New York City) in March 2001. He performed in the Adam Guettel song cycle Myths and Hymns in January and February 2012 at the Prospect Theater Company. He performed his solo show at 54 Below (New York City) in November 2012. In April 2013 he appeared in the Town Hall concert series Broadway by the Year, The Broadway Musicals of 1972.

He performed in the New York Musical Theatre Festival presentation of staged concerts of Song Moments by Daniel Maté in July 2013. He performed in Scott Siegel's Broadway Ballyhoo! at the Laurie Beechman Theatre (New York City) in October 2013. In September 2014 he appeared in Broadway Showstopper Divos — A Swell Party at the Metropolitan Room (New York City) to benefit The Actors Fund.

== Credits ==
=== Broadway ===
- Legs Diamond, 1988
- Grand Hotel, 1989
- Kiss of the Spider Woman, 1994
- Dirty Blonde, 2000, Tony nominated for Best Featured Actor in a Play
- Urban Cowboy, 2003, Tony nominated for Best Original Score
- Souvenir, 2005
- Grey Gardens, 2006

=== Off-Broadway ===
Source: Internet Off-Broadway Database

- The No-Frills Revue, 1987
- Hello Again, 1994 (replacement for John Dossett as The Senator)
- The Last Session, 1997
- Saturn Returns: A Concert, 1998
- Dirty Blonde, 2000
- As You Like It, 2005
- Grey Gardens, 2006
- Hello Again, 2011
- A Civil War Christmas, 2012

=== Television ===
- Allegra's Window, 1994
- March 29th, 1979, 1997
- Star Trek: Voyager, 1999 (episode "Dragon's Teeth")
- Law & Order, 2005

=== CD ===
- Come Down Angel, 2003
