= Lend Me a Tenor =

Play written by Ken Ludwig

- Original language: English
- Written by: Ken Ludwig
- Genre: Comedy
- Setting: A hotel suite in Cleveland, Ohio in 1934.

Premiere
- Date: March 6, 1986
- Place: West End

Lend Me a Tenor is a comedy by Ken Ludwig. The play was produced on both the West End (1986) and Broadway (1989). It received nine Tony Award nominations and won for Best Actor (Philip Bosco) and Best Director (Jerry Zaks). A Broadway revival opened in 2010. Lend Me a Tenor has been translated into sixteen languages and produced in twenty-five countries. The title is a pun on "Lend me a tenner" (i.e., a ten-dollar bill).

== Synopsis ==
The play takes place in 1934, in a hotel suite in Cleveland, Ohio. The two-room set has a sitting room with a sofa and chairs at right and a bedroom at left. A center "stage wall" divides the two rooms, with a door leading from one room to the other. (Throughout the play, the audience can see what's happening in both rooms at the same time.)

=== Act I ===
As Scene I of the play opens, Henry Saunders, general manager of the Cleveland Grand Opera Company, is anxiously awaiting the arrival of Tito Merelli, a world-famous Italian opera tenor, known as "Il Stupendo" to his many fans. Merelli is coming to Cleveland to sing the lead role in a performance of Giuseppe Verdi's Otello. (Note: Otello changed to Pagliacci in musical adaptation and official revisions of the play since 2019, presumably due to the use of blackface in Otello. This plot summary describes the play as it was performed before revisions.) It's the biggest event in the Cleveland Opera's history. A sellout crowd and the members of the Cleveland Opera Guild will be at the opera house that evening to see the great Merelli.

Saunders' harried assistant, Max, is also in the hotel suite. Saunders has charged Max with seeing to Merelli's needs, and with getting Merelli to the opera house in time for the performance. Also there is Maggie Saunders, Henry's daughter and Max's sometime girlfriend. Maggie is a fan of Tito Merelli, and hopes to meet him.

Tito finally arrives at the hotel suite, accompanied by his hot-tempered Italian wife, Maria, who is jealous because Tito flirts with other women. When she finds Maggie hiding in the bedroom closet, trying to get Tito's autograph, Maria angrily assumes that Maggie is Tito's secret lover. Maria writes Tito a "Dear John" letter, and leaves the hotel.

In the sitting room, Max gives Tito a tranquilizer-laced drink, trying to calm him down before the performance. (Unbeknownst to either of them, Tito accidentally takes a double-dose of tranquilizers.) When he learns that Max is an aspiring opera singer, Tito kindly gives Max a singing lesson, teaching him to "loosen up" and sing with more confidence. Tito and Max sing a duet together ("Dio, che nell'alma infondere" from Verdi's Don Carlos).

When Tito returns to the bedroom, he finds Maria's note. Horrified that his wife has left him, Tito goes into a fit of passion and tries to "kill himself" with various non-lethal objects (e.g. trying to stab himself with a wine bottle). Max manages to calm Tito down, and takes the singer into the bedroom, where Tito lies down on the bed for a rest.

Much later (Scene II), Max is unable to wake Tito from his nap. Max finds an empty medicine bottle and Maria's "Dear John" letter, which is written in such a way ("By the time you read this, I will be gone.") that Max mistakenly thinks Tito has committed suicide. When Saunders arrives, Max tearfully tells him that Tito is dead.

Saunders is furious. The opera performance will have to be cancelled, and the audience will demand their money back. It will be a disaster for the Cleveland opera, and for Saunders himself.

However, Saunders comes up with a plan. Since no one else knows that Tito is dead, Max will step into the Othello role and pretend to be Tito. Wearing Tito's costume and makeup, Max will star in the opera performance. The audience will never know that it is not Tito Merelli, and they can announce Tito's death tomorrow morning. Max reluctantly agrees to the plan. He goes into the bathroom to change, and later returns, dressed as Othello, in a costume, wig, and blackface makeup. As the curtain falls on Act One, Saunders and Max leave for the performance, just as Tito wakes up in the bedroom.

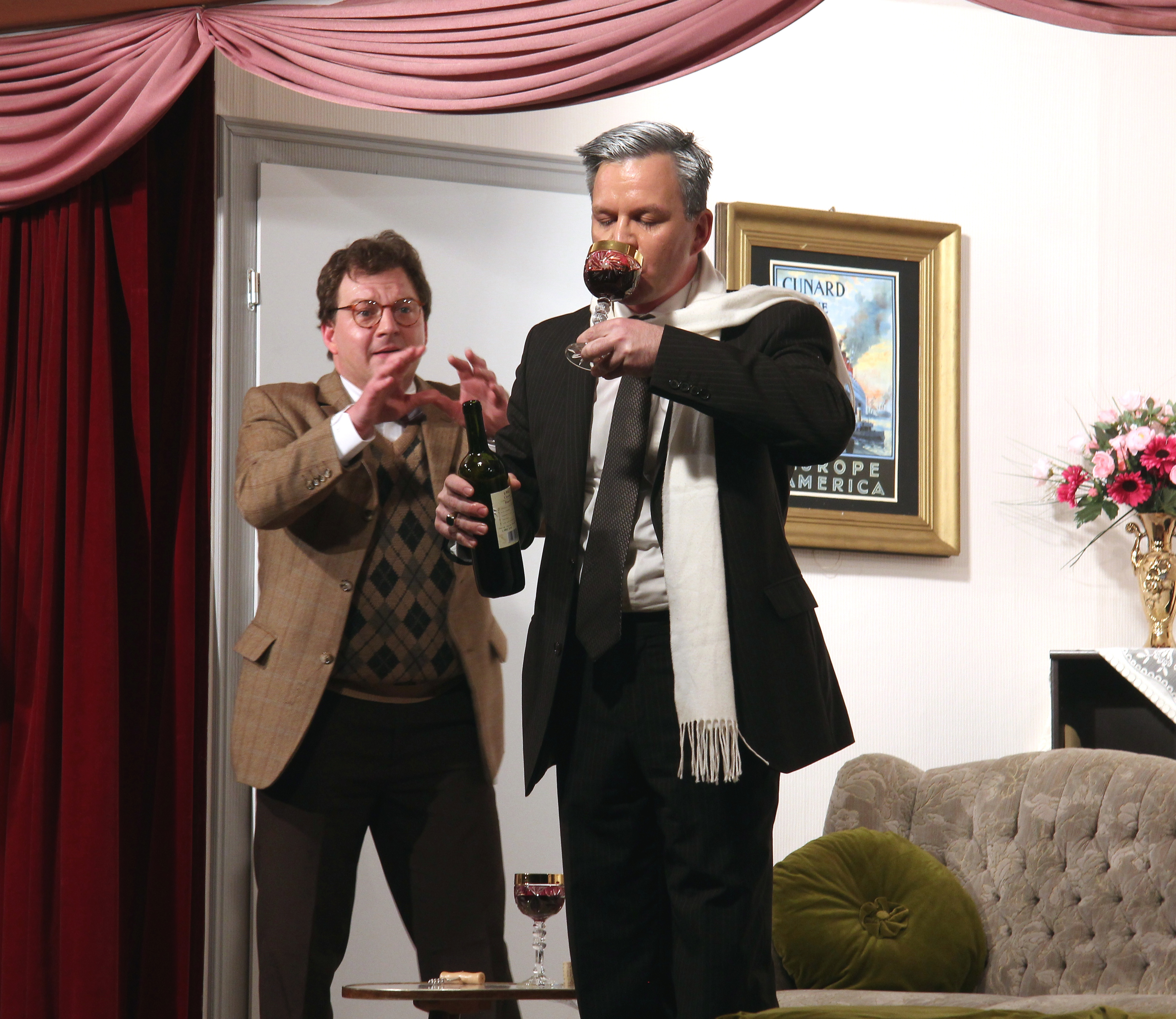
Nightcap for Merelli

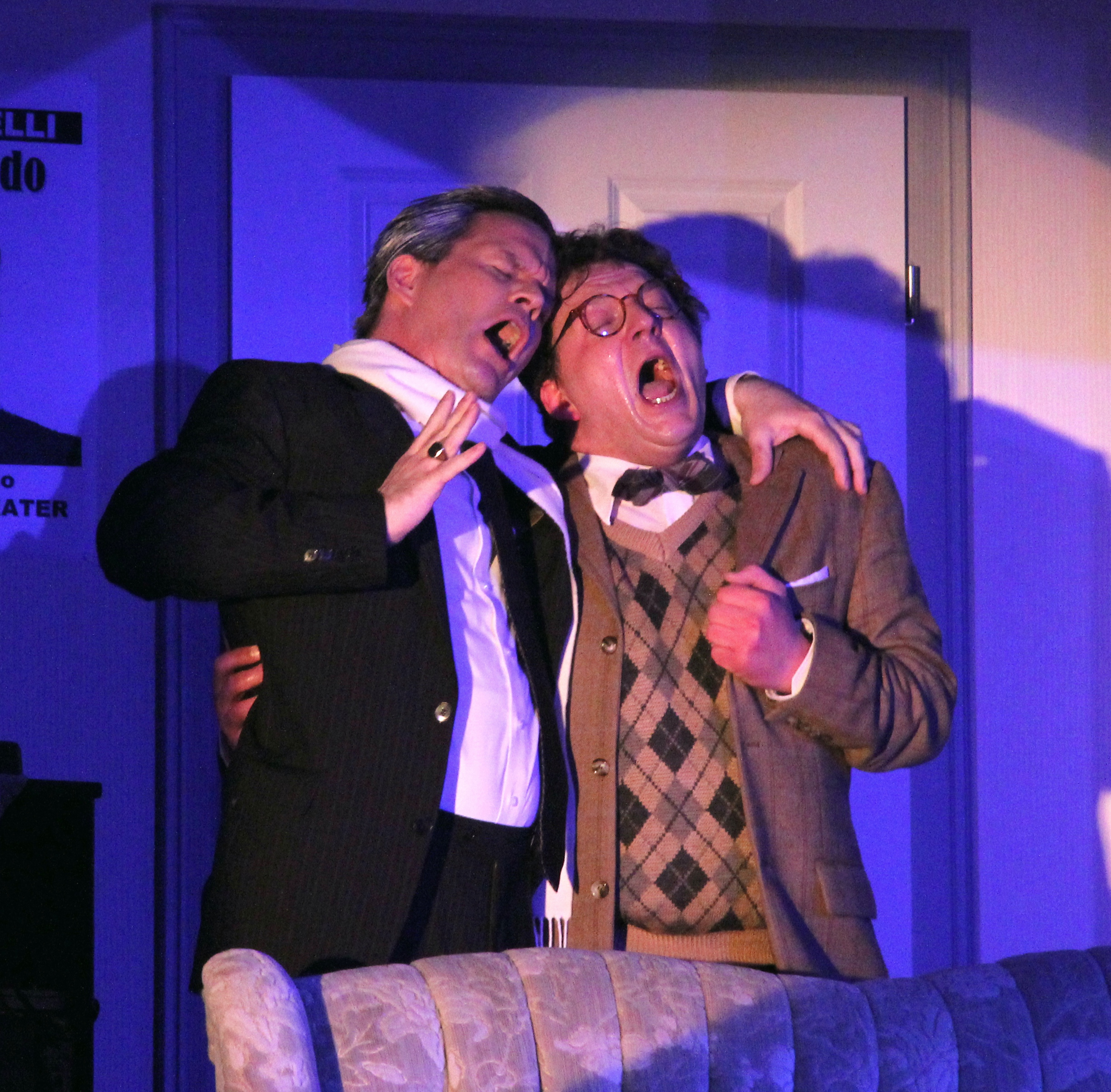
Singing lesson with the maestro

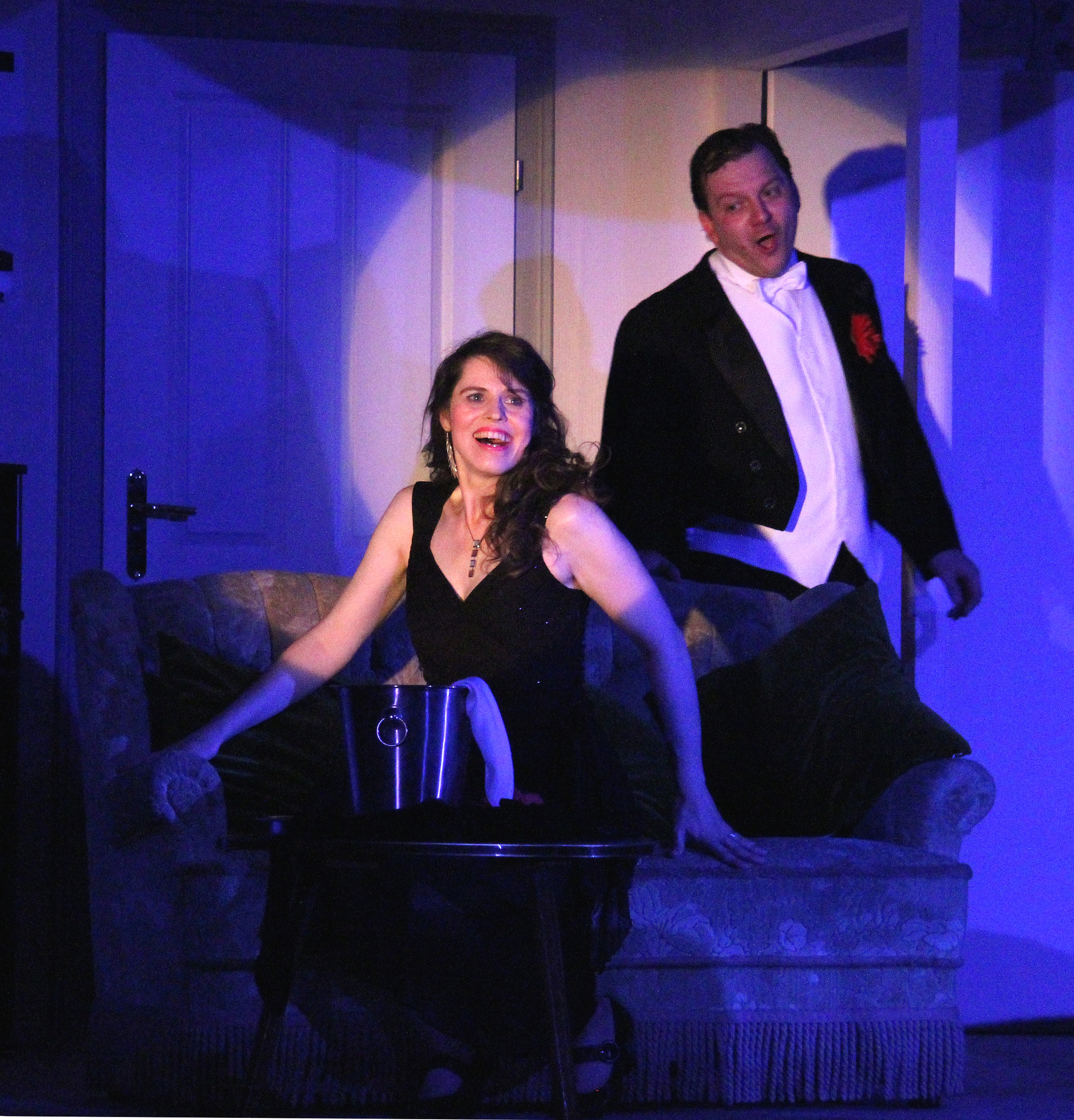
Max singing for Maggie

=== Act II ===
As the second act opens, Saunders and Max return to the hotel suite. Max's performance as Othello was a huge success, and no one suspected that he was not Tito. Then Saunders gets a phone call, telling him that the police are downstairs in the lobby. They are looking for "a lunatic dressed as Othello, who thinks he's Tito Merelli." During Max's performance, the "lunatic" tried to force his way into the opera house, hit a policeman who tried to stop him, and ran away.

Saunders tells Max to quickly change out of his Othello costume and makeup, while he goes downstairs to handle the police. Max returns to the bedroom, but is shocked and horrified to find Tito is missing from the bed. Still wearing his Othello costume, Max leaves the hotel suite and runs to find Saunders.

A few seconds later, Tito Merelli returns to the hotel suite, also dressed as Othello, in a costume, wig, and blackface makeup. Frantic and on the run from the police, Tito is even more confused when other characters in the play show up to congratulate him on his "magnificent performance" as Othello.

For the rest of the play, Max and Tito—who are identical in their Othello costumes and makeup—are repeatedly mistaken for each other, as they alternately run in and out of the hotel suite. Max is mistaken for Tito, and Tito is mistaken for Max by Saunders. Also, Tito and Max both find themselves being romantically pursued by Maggie Saunders, and by Diana, the Cleveland Opera's sexy and ambitious soprano. Eventually, Diana seduces Tito in the bedroom, while Maggie simultaneously seduces Max (who she thinks is Tito) in the living room.

At the end of the play, things are sorted out. Maria returns to the hotel and makes up with the bewildered Tito, while Max manages to step into the bathroom long enough to change out of his Othello costume and wig, and emerge as himself. Tito and Maria leave together, while Saunders accompanies Diana to a downstairs reception. Maggie realizes that not only was Max the "Tito" that she had sex with, he was also the "Tito" who sang so passionately in tonight's opera performance. As the play closes, Max and Maggie share a kiss.

== Productions ==
The play, originally titled Opera Buffa, had been produced at a summer theater, American Stage Festival, Milford, NH, in 1985. The first review, in the NH Derry News, called it "one of the most brilliant and inspired new comedies this year." The English director David Gilmore read it and asked to direct; Andrew Lloyd Webber was the producer.

The West End production opened on March 6, 1986 at the Globe Theatre, where it ran for ten months, closing on January 10, 1987. The cast featured Ron Holgate (Tito), Anna Nicholas (Maria), Edward Hibbert (Bellhop), Denis Lawson (Max), Jan Francis (Maggie), John Barron (Saunders), Gwendolyn Humble (Diana), and Josephine Blake (Julia).

After sixteen previews, the Broadway production, directed by Jerry Zaks, opened on March 2, 1989 at the Royale Theatre, and closed on April 22, 1990 after 476 performances. The cast included Philip Bosco (Saunders), Victor Garber (Max), Ron Holgate (Tito), Tovah Feldshuh (Maria), Caroline Lagerfelt (Diana), Jane Connell (Julia), J. Smith-Cameron (Maggie) and Jeff Brooks (Bellhop).

A Broadway revival began performances at the Music Box Theatre on March 13, 2010 in preview and officially opened on April 4, 2010. Directed by Stanley Tucci, the cast starred Anthony LaPaglia (Tito Merelli), Jay Klaitz (Frank the Bellhop), Justin Bartha (Max), Jan Maxwell (Maria), Mary Catherine Garrison (Maggie), Jennifer Laura Thompson (Diana), and husband and wife couple Tony Shalhoub (Saunders) and Brooke Adams (Julia). The revival closed its limited run on August 15, 2010.

The musical version, with book and lyrics by Peter Sham and Music by Brad Carroll opened at the Theatre Royal, Plymouth, on September 24 and ran until October 6, 2010, after which it transferred to the Gielgud Theatre on London's West End on June 15, 2011 and closed on August 6, 2011, despite mostly rave reviews but two months of poor ticket sales. The musical was the first to replace the use of Otello with the opera Pagliacci, which effectively removes the play's questionable elements.

== Characters ==
- Henry Saunders – The Cleveland Grand Opera's general manager. Father to Maggie. A blowhard who often loses his temper at the slightest mishap.
- Max – Saunders' long-suffering assistant and Maggie's suitor, forced to take Tito's place in the role of Othello.
- Maggie Saunders – Saunders' daughter, and Max's girlfriend. She has a great admiration for Tito.
- Tito Merelli – The world's most renowned opera tenor, and notorious ladies man.
- Maria – Tito's long-suffering wife, with an "Italian temper". Leaves Tito early in the play, but ultimately returns to him. Loves Tito, despite his philandering.
- Diana – The opera's ingenue soprano, who is "flinging her way" to the top. A seductive woman (and she knows it).
- Julia – Chairwoman of the Cleveland Opera Guild, who considers herself a "grande dame." She wears a silver dress which, Saunders says, makes her look "like the Chrysler Building."
- The Bellhop – A comic relief character who has an ongoing feud with Saunders. An obnoxious opera fan, the bellhop keeps showing up at the hotel suite at the wrong moment, trying to get an autograph and a photo of Tito Merelli.

== Adaptations ==
A musical adaptation was presented in May 2006 as a staged reading as part of the Utah Shakespearean Festival's New American Playwright Project, in Cedar City, Utah, followed by rewrites and a production as part of USF's Summer 2007 repertory season, which received rave reviews. The musical opened in London's West End in June 2011, directed by Ian Talbot and choreographed by Randy Skinner.

A sequel titled Comedy of Tenors was written by Ludwig.

In 2022, Ludwig adapted a gender-swapped version of the play entitled Lend Me a Soprano which ran Alley Theatre in Houston, Texas from September 16 until October 9. Directed by Eleanor Holdridge, the production starred Alexandra Silber and Mia Pinero.

== Revision ==
In 2019 the official licensed performance script was revised by Ken Ludwig, removing all references to Otello and replacing them with Pagliacci.

In 2022, Ludwig adapted a gender-swapped version of the play entitled Lend Me a Soprano which ran Alley Theatre in Houston, Texas. Ludwig replaced the opera to Carmen. This revision is available for licensing through Concord Theatricals.

== Awards and honors ==
=== West End production ===
Year	Award	Category	Nominee	Result
1986	Laurence Olivier Award	Best New Comedy	Ken Ludwig	Nominated

=== Broadway production ===
Year	Award	Category	Nominee	Result
1989	Tony Award	Best Play	Ken Ludwig	Nominated
1989	Tony Award	Best Actor	Philip Bosco	Won
1989	Tony Award	Best Actor	Victor Garber	Nominated
1989	Tony Award	Best Featured Actress	Tovah Feldshuh	Nominated
1989	Tony Award	Best Scenic Design	Tony Walton	Nominated
1989	Tony Award	Best Costume Design	William Ivey Long	Nominated
1989	Tony Award	Best Direction	Jerry Zaks	Won
1989	Drama Desk Award	Outstanding Actor	Philip Bosco	Won
1989	Drama Desk Award	Outstanding Featured Actress	Tovah Feldshuh	Won
1989	Drama Desk Award	Outstanding Director	Jerry Zaks	Won
1989	Drama Desk Award	Outstanding Costume Design	William Ivey Long	Won
1989	Drama Desk Award	Outstanding Lighting Design	Paul Gallo	Nominated
1989	Drama Desk Award	Outstanding Set Design	Tony Walton	Nominated

=== 2010 Broadway Revival ===
Year	Award	Category	Nominee	Result
2010	Tony Award	Best Revival	Ken Ludwig	Nominated
2010	Tony Award	Best Featured Actress	Jan Maxwell	Nominated
2010	Tony Award	Best Costume Design	Martin Pakledinaz	Nominated
2010	Drama League Award	Distinguished Revival of a Play		Nominated
2010	Drama League Award	Distinguished Performance	Jan Maxwell	Nominated
2010	Drama League Award	Distinguished Performance	Tony Shalhoub	Nominated
2010	Outer Critics Circle Award	Outstanding Revival		Nominated
2010	Outer Critics Circle Award	Outstanding Director	Stanley Tucci	Nominated
2010	Outer Critics Circle Award	Outstanding Featured Actress	Jan Maxwell	Nominated
2010	Outer Critics Circle Award	Outstanding Costume Design	Martin Pakledinaz	Nominated
