= Christine Andreas =

American Broadway actress and singer (born 1951)

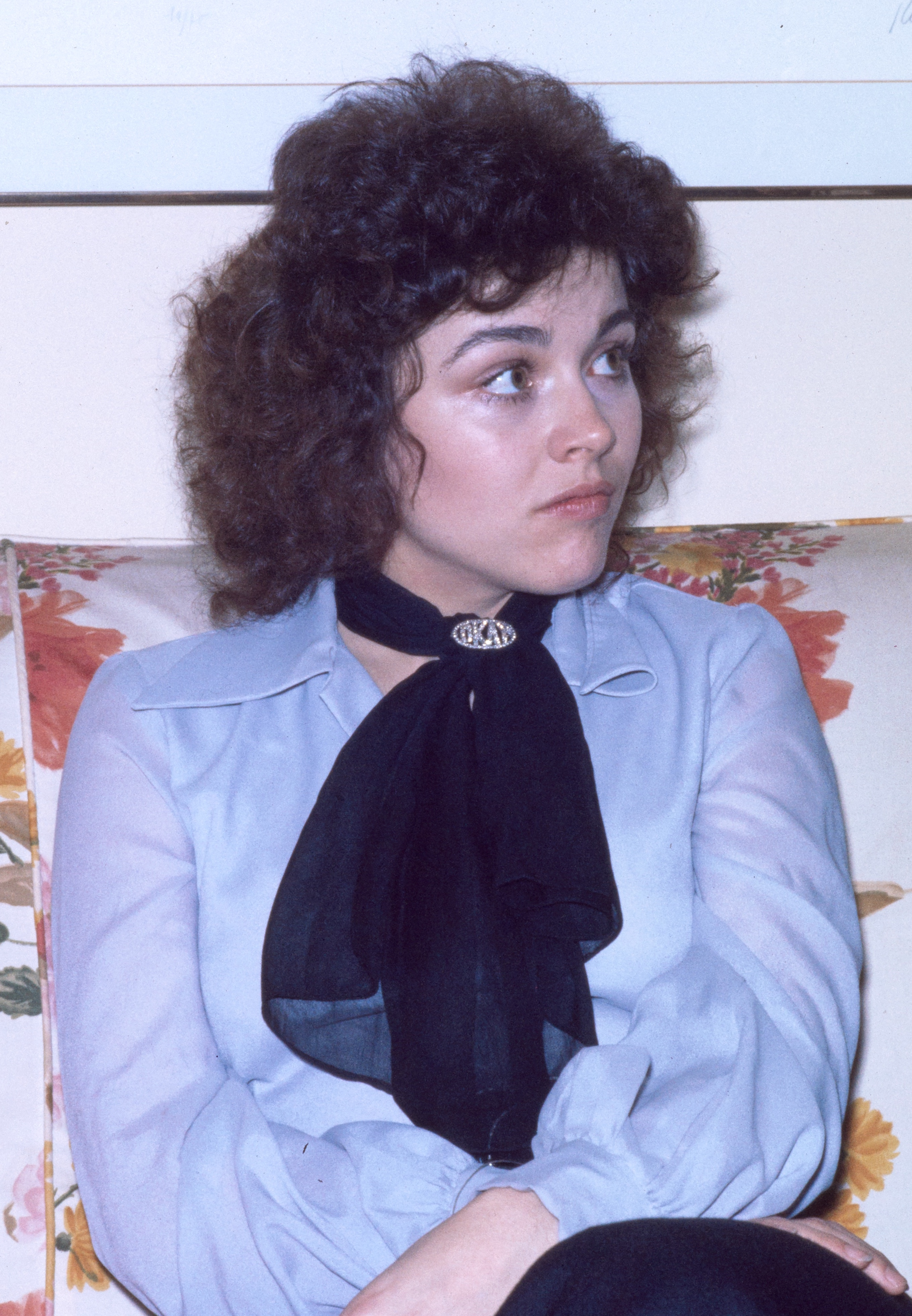
- Andreas circa 1976
- Born: October 1, 1951 (age 75); Camden, New Jersey, U.S.
- Occupations: Singer, actress
- Years active: 1975–present
- Spouses: Kevin Hunter, Martin Silvestri
- Children: 1
- Awards: Theatre World Award (1976)
- Website: www.christineandreas.com

Christine Andreas (born October 1, 1951) is an American Broadway actress and singer.

== Early life and education ==
Andreas was born on October 1, 1951, in Camden, New Jersey, to James Francis Andreas, a systems analyst, and Teresa Cecilia Genovese Andreas.

She grew up in Suffern, New York, and is an alumnus of Suffern High School.

== Career ==
=== Broadway ===
She made her Broadway debut in a 1975 revival of Angel Street. In 1976 she was cast as Eliza Doolittle in the 20th Anniversary production of My Fair Lady, for which she received the Theatre World Award. Additional theatre credits include Oklahoma! as Laurey in 1979 (Tony Award nomination for Best Actress in a Musical), On Your Toes in 1983 (Tony Award nomination for Best Featured Actress in a Musical), The Scarlet Pimpernel (1997), Words & Music with Sammy Cahn (standby, 1974), and Rags (1986).

Her role in Legs Diamond (1988) as "Alice" was removed during previews.

She was featured in the musical revue Stardust, which was conceived and written by Albert Harris with costumes and sets designed by Erté. The musical ran at the Stamford Center for the Arts at the Palace Theater and the Kennedy Center in 1990 but did not open on Broadway as had been planned.

She starred in the U.S. tour as Margaret Johnson in The Light in the Piazza, which began in San Francisco in August 2006.

In 2010, she portrayed the role of Jacqueline in the Broadway revival of La Cage Aux Folles, which opened April 18, 2010. The show was a transfer from London's West End.

=== Regional ===
She appeared in Tartuffe at the Kennedy Center in 1982, as Mariane and Twelfth Night (Alaska Rep).

She appeared in the Marsha Norman play Sarah and Abraham at the George Street Playhouse, New Brunswick, New Jersey in February 1992, and Promises, Promises.

Andreas starred as Judy Garland in Heartbreaker: Two Months with Judy Garland, the stage premiere of John Meyer's 1983 book about his time with Garland, which ran at the Adirondack Theatre Festival in June 2013.

She collaborated with composer Martin Silvestri in the musical The Fields of Ambrosia. She appeared in the musical in 1993 at the George Street Playhouse, New Brunswick, New Jersey. She also appeared in the musical in London at the Aldwych Theatre in 1996.

She appeared in Pal Joey at the Prince Music Theater as "Vera" in 2002. She received the Barrymore Award for Outstanding Leading Actress in a Musical).

=== Television ===
Andreas' television appearances include The Cosby Show, Another World, Sylvia Fine Kaye's Musical Comedy Tonight III (1995) and Law & Order: Special Victims Unit. She portrayed Ava Gardner in the made-for-TV movie Mia, Child of Hollywood (1995).

=== Cabaret ===
She has performed her cabaret act in the Café Carlyle, the Algonquin Hotel's Oak Room, Carnegie Hall in New York City, in the Catalina Grill in Los Angeles, and the Ballroom in New York City in 1989.

She has appeared in concert in London, Paris, Rome and at The White House.

Andreas performed her new show "Bemused" at 54 Below in 2013. Stephen Holden, reviewing for The New York Times, wrote: "The days are long gone when she starred on Broadway in revivals of “My Fair Lady” and “Oklahoma!,” but her beauty and radiance remain undimmed. Her bright, shiny soprano, with its wheeling vibrato and metallic edge, conveys a high-strung emotionality that is sharpened by her acting skills."

She gave a concert at the Kupferberg Center for the Arts at Queens College, New York City based on her recording Love is Good in February 2014.

== Awards and nominations ==
- Theater World Award 1976, My Fair Lady, recipient;
- Tony Award Best Actress in a Musical 1980, Oklahoma! (nomination)
- Tony Award Best Featured Actress in a Musical 1983, On Your Toes (nomination);
- Barrymore Award 2003, Philadelphia, Outstanding Leading Actress in a Musical Pal Joey (winner)
- Helen Hayes Award 2007, Washington, D.C., Musical, Outstanding Leading Actress, Non-Resident Production, The Light in the Piazza (nomination)

== Recordings ==
Solo recordings include

- Love is Good
- Here's to the Ladies
- The Carlyle Set
- Piaf - no Regrets

Cast recordings include

- My Fair Lady - 20th Anniversary - 1976 Revival
- Oklahoma! 1979 Revival
- On Your Toes 1983 Revival
- Fields of Ambrosia 1996 Cast
- The Scarlet Pimpernel 1997 Cast
- The Scarlet Pimpernel-Encore 1998 Cast
- La Cage Aux Folles 2010 Revival.

Other related recordings

- Beauty and the Beast - 1974 Studio
- Snow White and the Seven Dwarfs - 1974 Studio
- Lovesong: A Musical Entertainment - 1980 Cast
- Alec Wilder's Clues to a Life - 1982 Cast
- Lola - 1985 Cast;
- Maury Yeston Songbook - Various
- Broadway Unplugged - Various
- Broadway Musicals of 1929 - Various
- Broadway Musicals of 1956 - Various
- Musicality of Rodgers and Hart - Various
- The Singles - Various
- A Cabaret Cocktail - Various
- New York: Destination Music - Various
- Falling in Love Is Wonderful: Broadway's Greatest Love Duets - Various
- Carols for a Cure 2010 Vol.12 - Various.

== Reviews ==
Source: Official Site

- "Right Tune, Right Singer: Pure Alchemy" From: Stephen Holden, "Christine Andreas, Bemused: Live at 54 Below", The New York Times, January 29, 2013.
- "Christine Andreas is everything anyone who loves romantic pop music could want - simply sine qua non." From: Liz Smith, "The Oak Room At The Algonquin Hotel", New York Post, Spring, 1999.
- "She finds a blend of lyricism and sweet sensuality that only the finest Broadway voices can conjure." From: Stephen Holden, "Christine Andreas, Oak Room at the Algonquin", The New York Times, March 14, 2000.
- "A lyric soprano with a distinctive, gorgeous voice, Andreas illuminates the mood and meaning of each song through her considerable acting skills." From: Christine Dolan, "Treasure of Broadway shines in cabaret show", The Miami Herald, February 1, 2008.
- "Andreas' performance made it clear that she has every reason to feel at home in any jazz club she chooses to grace with her mesmerizing musical presence." From: Don Heckman, "She's a Broadway baby at home with jazz: Christine Andreas transforms all types of songs in her West Coast nightclub debut", Los Angeles Times, May 29, 2004.
- "Not all sopranos can summon the warmth and intimacy cabaret singing requires." From: Elysa Gardner, "The Carlyle Set", USA Today, undated.
- "Christine Andreas has one of the four or five most compelling voices to be heard in the Broadway theater." From: Holden, Stephen, "Love is Good", The New York Times, undated.
- "Many singers have lovely voices. Very few interpret lyrics the way they were meant to be sung. Christine Andreas does just that. As a lyricist, I can only applaud." From: Hal David, "Love is Good", undated.

== Personal life ==
She is married to composer and musician Martin Silvestri. Andreas has one son and Silvestri has one daughter.

She was previously married to creative director Kevin Hunter.
