= Julie Wilson =

American actress (1924–2015)

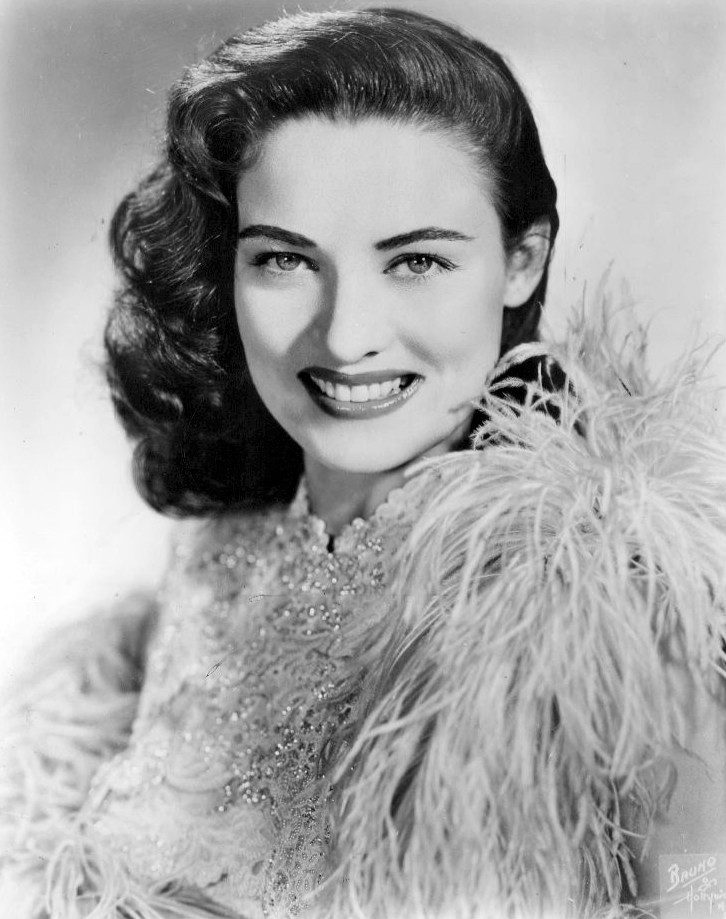
- Wilson in 1956
- Born: Julie May Wilson; October 21, 1924; Omaha, Nebraska, U.S.
- Died: April 5, 2015 (aged 90); New York, New York, U.S.
- Occupations: Singer, actress
- Years active: 1942–2013
- Notable work: Legs Diamond; Kiss Me, Kate
- Children: 2, including Holt McCallany

Julie May Wilson (October 21, 1924 – April 5, 2015) was an American singer and actress widely regarded as "the queen of cabaret". She was nominated for the Tony Award for Best Featured Actress in a Musical in 1989 for her performance in Legs Diamond.

== Early life ==
Wilson was born in Omaha, Nebraska, United States, the daughter of Emily (née Wilson), a hairdresser, and Russell Wilson, a coal salesman. She first found a musical outlet with local musical group "Hank's Hepcats" in her teenage years and briefly attended Omaha University. She won the title of Miss Nebraska and would have competed in the Miss America pageant, until it was discovered that she was just under the required minimum age of 18. She headed to New York City during World War II and found work in two of Manhattan's leading nightclubs, the Latin Quarter and the Copacabana. Gossip columnist Hedda Hopper, in a 1948 newspaper column, referred to Wilson as "Kay Thompson's discovery," adding that Wilson "is being tested by Arthur Freed at Metro."

== Career ==
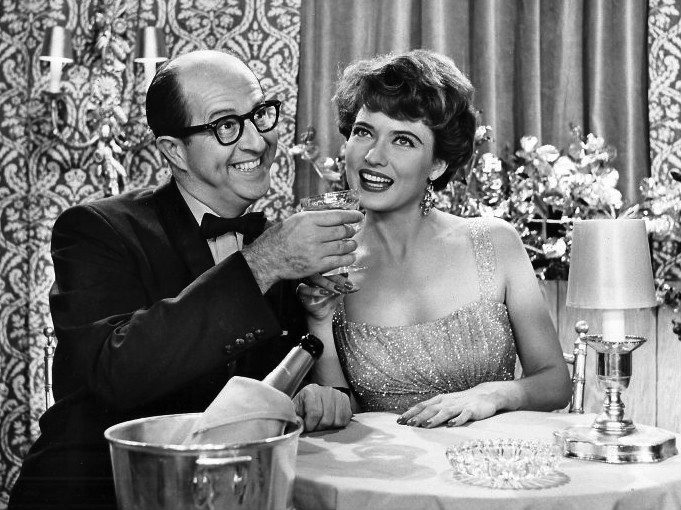
Wilson with Phil Silvers in an episode of The Phil Silvers Show in 1958

She made her Broadway stage debut in the 1946 revue Three to Make Ready. In 1951, she moved to London to star in the West End production of Kiss Me, Kate and remained there for four years, appearing in shows such as South Pacific and Bells Are Ringing while studying at the Royal Academy of Dramatic Arts. She returned to New York to replace Joan Diener in Kismet. Additional Broadway credits include The Pajama Game (1954), Jimmy (1969), Park (1970), and Legs Diamond (1988), for which she received a Tony Award nomination as Best Featured Actress in a Musical. She also toured in Show Boat, Panama Hattie, Silk Stockings, Follies, Company, and A Little Night Music.

In 1957, Wilson sang with Ray Anthony and his Orchestra, contributing vocals to a number of songs in the soundtrack to the film This Could Be The Night. Wilson also had an acting role in the film, as singer Ivy Corlane. The same year she appeared as Rosebud in The Strange One, opposite Ben Gazzara. Wilson's television credits include regular roles on the American daytime soap opera The Secret Storm. She also appeared in a Hallmark Hall of Fame telecast of Kiss Me, Kate and numerous episodes of The Ed Sullivan Show.

== Personal life ==
On October 18, 1954, Wilson married talent agent Barron Reynolds Polan in Arlington County, Virginia. They divorced in December 1955, and on December 29, 1955, she married her second husband, film producer Harvey Goldstein Bernhard in Las Vegas, Nevada.

With her third husband, actor/producer Michael McAloney, Wilson had two sons, Holt and Michael, Jr., who attended school in Ireland while their parents worked in New York City. When the marriage failed, Wilson sent the boys to live with her parents in Omaha. When they reached their teen years, she retired and joined them. Holt McAloney is now credited for acting roles as Holt McCallany. Michael McAloney Jr. died in 1991.

In 1983, with her sons grown and her parents deceased, she found her niche and forged her reputation as a cabaret performer, known primarily for her dramatic delivery of torch songs and show tunes.

Wilson suffered a stroke on April 5, 2015, in Manhattan and died the same day. She was 90.
