= Gabriel Barre =

American director and actor

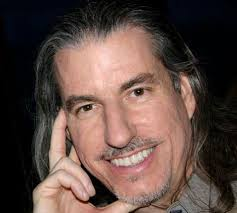
- Born: James Gabriel Barre; August 26, 1957 (age 69)
- Education: American Academy of Dramatic Arts
- Occupations: Director and actor
- Spouse: Tricia Paoluccio
- Parent(s): James Lyman Barre, Hallie Susan Hebb
- Website: gabrielbarre.com

Gabriel Barre (born James Gabriel Barre, August 26, 1957) is an American director and actor. Best known for creating original musicals, his work has been seen on Broadway, throughout the United States, and across four continents internationally.

== Early life and education ==
Gabriel Barre was born in Brattleboro, Vermont, and raised throughout the state, primarily in Burlington, Vermont. He is the son of an Episcopal priest, James Lyman Barre, and a systems analyst, Hallie Susan Hebb, and is the oldest of three children. At 18 he moved to New York City to pursue a career as an actor, attending the American Academy of Dramatic Arts (AADA). Upon graduation he spent five years as a member of the Richard Morse Mime Theatre at their Greenwich Village location, and performed with them at Lincoln Center, as well as touring the United States. His work with the company included serving as a cultural ambassador performing throughout the Middle East, including in Israel, Saudi Arabia, Syria, Iran, Afghanistan, Egypt, Algeria, Tunisia and Greece.

== Career ==
=== Actor ===
Gabriel Barre was nominated for a Tony Award for Best Performance by a Leading Actor in a Musical for his performance in Starmites and won a Bistro Award as an original cast member in Forever Plaid. Other New York performing credits include the original Broadway casts of: Ain't Broadway Grand, Rags, Anna Karenina, Barnum (first national tour) and Ragtime (final Toronto workshop); and original Off-Broadway casts of: Return to the Forbidden Planet, The Petrified Prince at the Public Theatre, Jacques Brel is Alive and Well and Living in Paris, and A Fine and Private Place, which he also directed. He was also in numerous productions at the Roundabout Theater, Mirror Repertory Company, Lamb's Theatre, Playwright's Horizons, Jewish Repertory Theatre, INTAR, York Theatre, LaMama, and others.

== Director ==
Gabriel Barre directed the Broadway production of Amazing Grace which also toured the country and is set to be a sit-down production at the new Museum of the Bible in Washington, DC in 2019. In New York City, he is widely known for his off-Broadway work: he directed the original production of Andrew Lippa's The Wild Party at the Manhattan Theatre Club starring Idina Menzel, Taye Diggs, Brian Darcy James and Julia Murney. The show won him the Calloway Award for Best Direction, and was nominated for five Outer Critics Circle Awards and thirteen Drama Desk Awards, both including Best Direction of a Musical. He directed the original production of John Cariani's Almost, Maine at the Daryl Roth Theatre, which has become one of the most frequently produced plays in the United States with over 4000 productions to date. It has been translated into a dozen languages and recently unseated Shakespeare as the most produced play in North American high schools. Other Off-Broadway productions in New York include the original productions of Summer of '42 at the Variety Arts Theatre, Honky Tonk Highway at Don't Tell Mama (winner of a MAC Award and Bistro Award for Best Review), Stars in Your Eyes at the Cherry Lane Theatre, Andrew Lippa's john & jen at the Lamb's Theatre and Son Of A Gun at the Samuel Beckett Theater.

Nationally, he directed the US national tour of Rodgers and Hammerstein's Cinderella, starring Eartha Kitt, which performed at NYC's Madison Square Garden; it toured and played regionally in the US for three years. He also directed the national tour of Pippin, which originated at the Goodspeed Opera House in Connecticut and played throughout the US and Canada. In 2015 he created the acclaimed new Stephen Schwartz musical Magic to Do in a production for Princess Cruise Lines.

His concert work includes the American Songbook Series at Lincoln Center three years in a row, several Musical by the Year concerts at Town Hall, the concert version of Pippin for World Aids Day, and The Four Seasons at Lincoln Center. His direction of the workshop of Forever Deadward: The Vampire Musical Parody, was praised on MTV, E!, EW and others. Upcoming concert work includes The Scarlet Pimpernel at Lincoln Center in 2019 with Manhattan Concert Productions.

He is currently directing the new original musical A Sign of the Times, a jukebox musical of Petula Clark music, written by Bruce Villanch and starring Chilina Kennedy which made its world premiere at the Delaware Theatre Company in Wilmington, Delaware.

=== International ===
Internationally, Gabriel Barre has directed the world premiere of Frank Wildhorn's adaptation of Carmen, which has just celebrated its 10th anniversary of a sold-out run at the Karlin Theater in Prague, Czech Republic, starring Lucie Bila. It was also filmed in 3D and commercially released throughout the Czech Republic. Also, at the Karlin, he mounted large-scale revivals of the musicals Jesus Christ Superstar and the Czech premiere of Elton John's Aida. He most recently directed the world premiere of a new Czech musical about Sherlock Holmes: Holmes, The Legend, written by Ondrej Brzobohaty in 2018.

He directed the world premiere of the Frank Wildhorn musical Tears of Heaven (nominated for eight Musical Awards including Best Direction) at the National Theatre in Seoul, South Korea. He also participated as a guest artist director with American Voices in Bangkok, Thailand.

In Mexico, he recently directed the non-replica Mexican premiere production of Billy Elliot, which was nominated and won numerous awards including Lunas Del Auditorio for BEST MUSICAL 2018. His production of Billy Elliot also received 12 nominations, including Best Musical and Best Direction from Los Premios Metropolitanos de teatro, winning five awards, in 2018.

In Japan, he directed the Umeda Art's Theatre production of Frank Wildhorn's The Scarlet Pimpernel, which was their coed premiere. The production went on to be revived the following year, after successfully touring Osaka and Tokyo.

In China, Gabe has worked on numerous projects, including Monkey King at the Water Cube, and is currently developing two shows there - one about the Wulanmuqii Dance Troupe in Inner Mongolia, as well as a new musical about the Silk Road to be produced in Xi'an, China set to open in 2020 at a theatre currently being built for the show. He is also currently working with Rupert Holmes on adapting Geling Yan's novel, Flowers of War, into a new musical, with the hopes of opening in China, followed by a Broadway run.

== Personal life ==
He currently resides in New York City with his wife, actress Tricia Paoluccio, and their two sons. His greatest influences as a director come from working as an actor with Graciela Daniela, Anne Bogart, Tom O'Horgan and Hal Prince, and alongside Geraldine Page and others at the Mirror Repertory Company, as well as his training with Sir Ian Richardson and Herbert Machiz.

== Filmography ==
=== Broadway ===
- Ragtime (final Toronto workshop)
- Ain't Broadway Grand
- Rags
- Anna Karenina
- Barnum, as Ringmaster in the first national tour.

=== Off-Broadway ===
- Return to the Forbidden Planet
- The Petrified Prince at the Public Theatre
- Jacques Brel is Alive and Well and Living in Paris, for which he also provided the musical staging
- A Fine and Private Place, which he also directed
- The Tempest at the Roundabout Theater, opposite Frank Langella
- The Mistress of the Inn, also at the Roundabout
- Marathon Dancing directed by Anne Bogart at En Garde Arts
- El Greco with INTAR at Playhouse 91, as well as numerous productions at Mirror Repertory Company
- Lamb's Theatre
- Playwright's Horizons
- Jewish Repertory Theatre
- York Theatre
- LaMama
- Cyrano de Bergerac at Rutgers University, where he played the title role
- Cyrano de Bergerac remounted Off Broadway in 2015, where he again played the title role

=== Film ===
- The Amazing Floydini
- The Gurneyman
- Luggage of the Gods
- Girl 6
- Summer of Sam
- Quiz Show
- The Road to Wellville
- Stardust Memories
- Best Eaten Cold
- The Dutch Master
- Eat and Run
- Can't Stop the Music

=== Television ===
- Law & Order
- Fame
- Kate & Allie
- Nickelodeon

== Awards and nominations ==
- 1989, Tony Award nomination for Best Leading Actor in a Musical for Starmites - Nominated
- Bistro Award as an original cast member in Forever Plaid - Won
- 1994, Honky-Tonk Highway - Winner of 4 Bistro Awards including Best Director and MAC Award for Best Review
- 1996, Sweeney Todd, Goodspeed Musicals, East Haddam, CT - Winner of 4 Connecticut Critics Awards including Best Musical and Best Direction of a Musical
- 1997, Finian's Rainbow nominated for 5 Connecticut critics circle awards, including best direction of a musical
- 2000, The Wild Party, Joseph A. Calloway Award for Best Direction of a Musical
- 2000, The Wild Party, 13 Drama Desk Nominations including Best Direction of a Musical
- 2000, The Wild Party, 5 Outer Critics Circle Nominations including Best Direction of a Musical
- 2004, Memphis - NSMT/TheatreWorks, Beverly, MA/Palo Alto, CA. - Winner of San Francisco Bay Area Critics Association Award, including Best Direction of a Musical
- 2005, Tom Jones, North Shore Music Theatre, Beverly, MA - Winner of Independent Reviewers of New England Award, including Best Direction of a Musical
- 2011, Tears of Heaven nominated for 8 Musical Awards including Best Direction at the National Theatre in Seoul, South Korea
- 2018, Billy Elliot non replica production that Barre directed was nominated and won Best Musical - LAS LUNAS DEL AUDITORIO
- 2018, 12 nominations, including Best Musical and Best Direction from Los Premios Metropolitanos de teatro, winning five awards
