= Pioneer Playhouse =

Oldest outdoor theater in the state of Kentucky

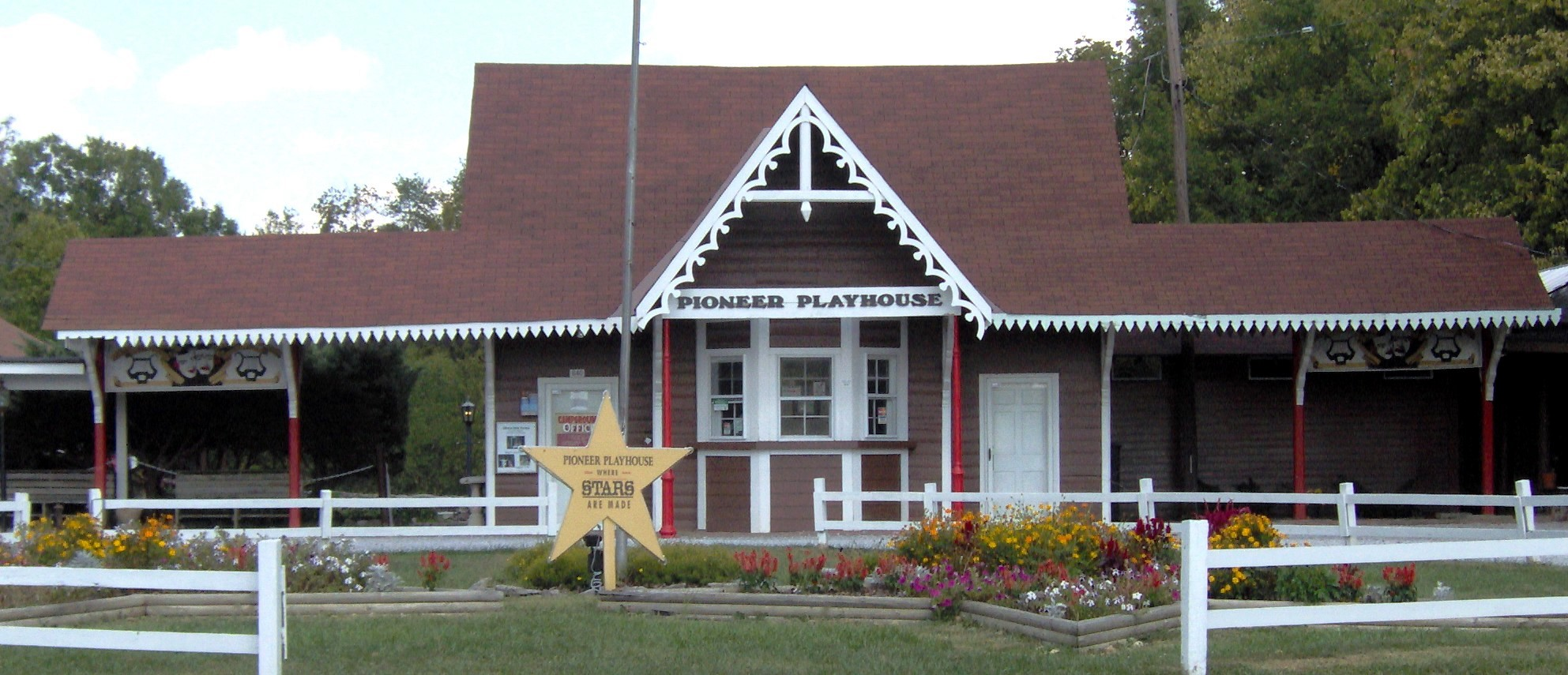
- Pioneer Playhouse
- Interactive map of Pioneer Playhouse
- Address: 840 Stanford Rd; Danville, Kentucky
- Coordinates: 37.63889°N 84.75667°W
- Type: Summerstock

Construction
- Opened: 1950

Website
- www.pioneerplayhouse.com

The Pioneer Playhouse, located in Danville, Kentucky, is the oldest outdoor theater in the state of Kentucky.

== History ==
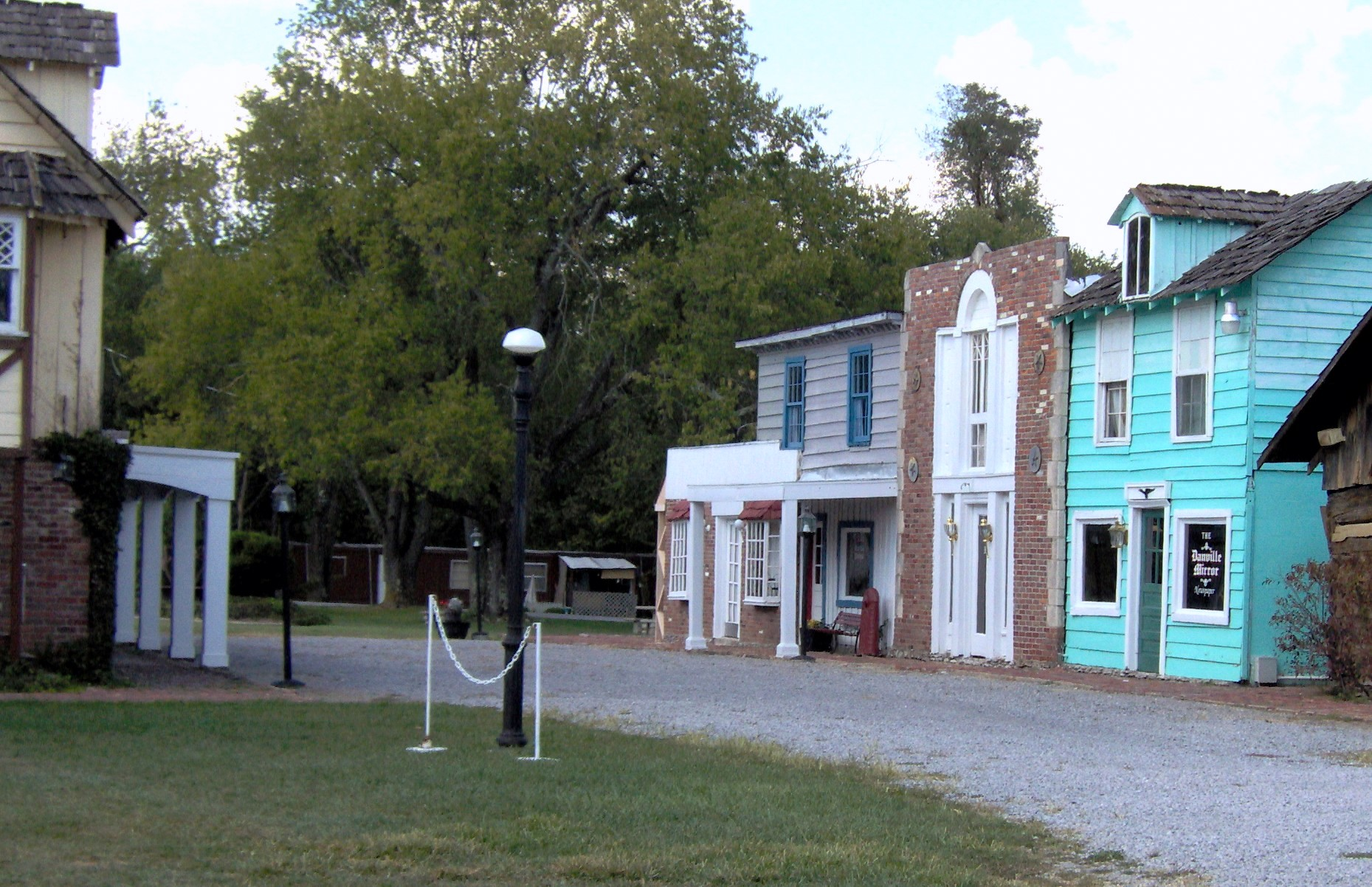
19th Century Main Street village and museum

The Pioneer Playhouse was built by Col. Eben C. Henson, who established the outdoor theater in 1950. Notable alumni actors include John Travolta, Lee Majors, then known as Harvey Yeary, and Jim Varney. In 1962, Pioneer Playhouse became the first theater in the nation to be accorded the legal status of State Theater by act of Legislation.

Since Henson's death in 2004, the theater had been run by Henson's widow, Charlotte, as producer, and her daughter, Holly, who served as artistic director until her death in 2012. Robby Henson, Charlotte's son, directs at least one play at the theater every summer.

After Holly's death, her siblings, Robby and Heather, returned to the Playhouse full-time to help their mother run the business. Robby took on the role of artistic director, and Heather assumed the duties of managing director. Charlotte, who always selected the plays for each season, died in February 2024, just a few months prior to the start of the Playhouse's 75th Anniversary season.

== Productions ==
- 2020 (season curtailed due to COVID-19 pandemic)
  - Maybe Baby, It's You by Charlie Shanian and Shari Simpson
- 2019
  - Kong's Night Out by Jack Neary
  - Sherlock Holmes and the Ice Palace Murders by Jeffrey Hatcher, based on the novel by Larry Millett
  - Breaking Up With Elvis by Robby Henson
  - Not Now Darling by Ray Cooney and John Chapman
  - Red, White and Tuna by Ed Howard, Joe Sears, and Jason Williams
- 2018
  - The Return of Tinker Doyle (sequel to 2013's Search for Tinker Doyle) by Elizabeth Orndorff
  - Drinking Habits 2: Caught in the Act by Tom Smith
  - Granted (sequel to Grounded and Guarded) by Holly Hepp-Galván and Robby Henson (adapted from the novel by Angela Correll)
  - Unnecessary Farce by Paul Slade Smith
  - Living on Love by Joe DiPietro
- 2017
  - Death by Darkness by Elizabeth Orndorff. The production was directed by Anthony Haigh.
  - Drinking Habits by Tom Smith
  - Guarded (sequel to 2015's Grounded) by Holly Hepp-Galván and Robby Henson (adapted from the novel by Angela Correll)
  - Baskerville: A Sherlock Holmes Mystery by Ken Ludwig
  - Elvis Has Left the Building by V. Cate and Duke Ernsberger
- 2016
  - One Man, Two Guvnors by Richard Bean
  - Mom's Gift by Phil Olson
  - Good Blues Tonight by Robby Henson
  - The Tell-Tale Farce by Don Zolidis
  - The Murder Room by Jack Sharkey
- 2015
  - One Slight Hitch by Lewis Black
  - La Bete (The Beast) by David Herson
  - Grounded by Chelsea Marcantel (adapted from the novel by Angela Correll)
  - Sherlock's Secret Life by Will Severin, Ed Lange
  - Boeing, Boeing! by Marc Camoletti, Beverley Cross, Francis Evans
- 2014
  - Whodunnit, Darling? by Charles Edward Pogue and Larry Drake
  - Is He Dead? by Mark Twain, adapted by David Ives
  - The Wonder Team by Robby Henson
  - Walking Across Egypt by Catherine Bush (adapted from the novel by Clyde Edgerton)
  - A Visit from Scarface by V. Cate and Duke Ernsberger
- 2013
  - Deathtrap by Ira Levin
  - Tamed by Holly Hepp-Galvan, adapted from The Taming of the Shrew
  - The Search for Tinker Doyle by Elizabeth Orndorff
  - Moon Over Buffalo by Ken Ludwig
  - Cockeyed by Samuel French
- 2012
  - Dracula Bites! by V. Cate and Duke Ernsberger
  - Picasso at the Lapin Agile by Steve Martin
  - Bottoms Up! by Gregg Kreutz
  - High Strangeness by Elizabeth Orndorff
  - Tuna Does Vegas by Jaston Williams, Joe Sears and Ed Howard
- 2011
  - The 39 Steps adapted by Patrick Barlow
  - Tartuffe: The Southern Version adapted from Molière
  - That Madcap Moon by Janet Henson Dow
  - Don't Cry for Me, Margaret Mitchell by V. Cate and Duke Ernsberger
  - Kosher Lutherans by William Missouri Downs
- 2010
  - A Nice Family Gathering by Phil Olson
  - Miranda: The Catch of the Day (Adapted from Miranda, by Peter Blackmore)
  - The Dillinger Dilemma (World Premiere by Elizabeth Orndorff)
  - For Better by Eric Coble The production was directed by Katherine M. Carter
  - Run for Your Wife by Ray Cooney The production was directed by Lawrence Lesher
- 2009
  - M is for Million by Jack Sharkey
  - The Infamous Ephraim by Holly Henson
  - Lend Me a Tenor by Ken Ludwig
  - Girl Crazy by Guy Bolton & John McGowan
  - Be My Baby by Ken Ludwig
- 2008
  - Leading Ladies by Ken Ludwig
  - Morning's at Seven by Paul Osborn.
  - Death by Darkness by Elizabeth Orndorff. The production was directed by Lawrence Lesher.
  - Love, Sex and the IRS by Billy Van Zandt and Jane Milmore. The production was directed by Synge Maher.
  - Cookin' with Gus by Jim Brochu. The production was directed by Lawrence Lesher.
- 2007
  - Babe, The Sheep Pig by David Wood. The production was directed by Robby Henson.
  - The Servant of Two Masters by Carlo Goldoni. The production was directed by Lawrence Lesher.
  - The Odd Couple by Neil Simon. The production was directed by Lawrence Lesher.
  - A Jarful of Fireflies by Catherine Bush. The production was directed by Robby Henson.
  - Greater Tuna by Jaston Williams, Joe Sears, & Ed Howard
- 2006
  - My Sister Eileen by Joseph A. Fields & Jerome Chodorov
  - Rumors by Neil Simon
  - Shakespeare in Hollywood by Ken Ludwig
  - Wait Until Dark by Frederick Knott
  - Social Security by Andrew Bergman
- 2005
  - On the Razzle by Tom Stoppard
  - Squabbles by Marshall Karp
  - The Man Who Came to Dinner by Moss Hart & George S. Kaufman
  - The Last of Jane Austen by Shirl Hendryx
  - Death by Golf by Gregg Kreutz
- 2004
  - Mr. Shaw Goes to Hollywood by Mark Saltzman
  - Cactus Flower by Abe Burrows
  - The Village Wooing by George Bernard Shaw
  - Sherlock's Secret Life by Will Severin, Ed Lange
  - Biloxi Blues by Neil Simon
- 2003
  - Impossible Marriage by Beth Henley
  - A Little Family Business by Jay Presson Allen
  - Fiddler on the Roof
  - Proposals by Neil Simon
  - Sylvia by A.R. Gurney
- 1997
  - Moon Over Buffalo
  - The Liar
  - Summer and Smoke
  - A Flea in Her Ear
  - Cookin' with Gus
- 1996
  - King of Hearts
  - That Madcap Moon
  - Sylvia
  - Spider's Web
  - Crossing Delancey
- 1995
  - The Nerd
  - Tom Jones
  - Any Given Day
  - Harvey by Mary Chase
  - My Fat Friend by Charles Laurence
- 1994
  - Boy Meets Girl
  - Look Homeward, Angel
  - The Man Who Came to Dinner
  - Scapino!
  - Social Security
- 1993
  - Lend Me A Tenor
  - Murder on the Nile
  - The Traveling Lady
  - Arsenic and Old Lace
  - Beau Jest
- 1992
  - The Matchmaker
  - Will Heal This Land
  - Born Yesterday
  - And A Nightingale Sang
  - I Hate Hamlet
- 1991
  - Noises Off
  - The Front Page
  - My Three Angels
  - Postmortem
  - Alone Together
