= My Baby =

My Baby may refer to:

== Songs ==
- "My Baby" (Bow Wow song), 2003
- "My Baby" (Cold Chisel song), 1980
- "My Baby" (Kállay Saunders song), 2012
- "My Baby" (Lil' Romeo song), 2001
- "My Baby" (Lil Skies song), 2021
- "My Baby" (Pretenders song), 1987
- "My Baby" (The Temptations song), 1965
- "My Baby", by Britney Spears from Circus, 2008
- "My Baby", by Janet Jackson from Damita Jo, 2004
- "My Baby", by Janis Joplin from Pearl, 1971
- "My Baby", by Jesse McCartney from Departure, 2008
- "My Baby...", by Juliana Hatfield from How to Walk Away, 2008
- "My Baby", by Pieter T, 2011
- "My Baby", by Zendaya from Zendaya, 2013
- "My Baby (He's Something Else)", by Irene Cara from Anyone Can See, 1982
- "My Baby (My Baby My Own)", by Diana Ross from Touch Me in the Morning, 1973

== Other uses ==
- My Baby (band), a Dutch-New Zealand band
- My Baby (film), a 1912 comedy short directed by D. W. Griffith
- My Baby (series), a series of single-player virtual life simulation video games

== See also ==
- Be My Baby (disambiguation)
- She's My Baby (disambiguation)
- There Goes My Baby (disambiguation)
