= Tokyo International Players =

English-language theater group in Japan

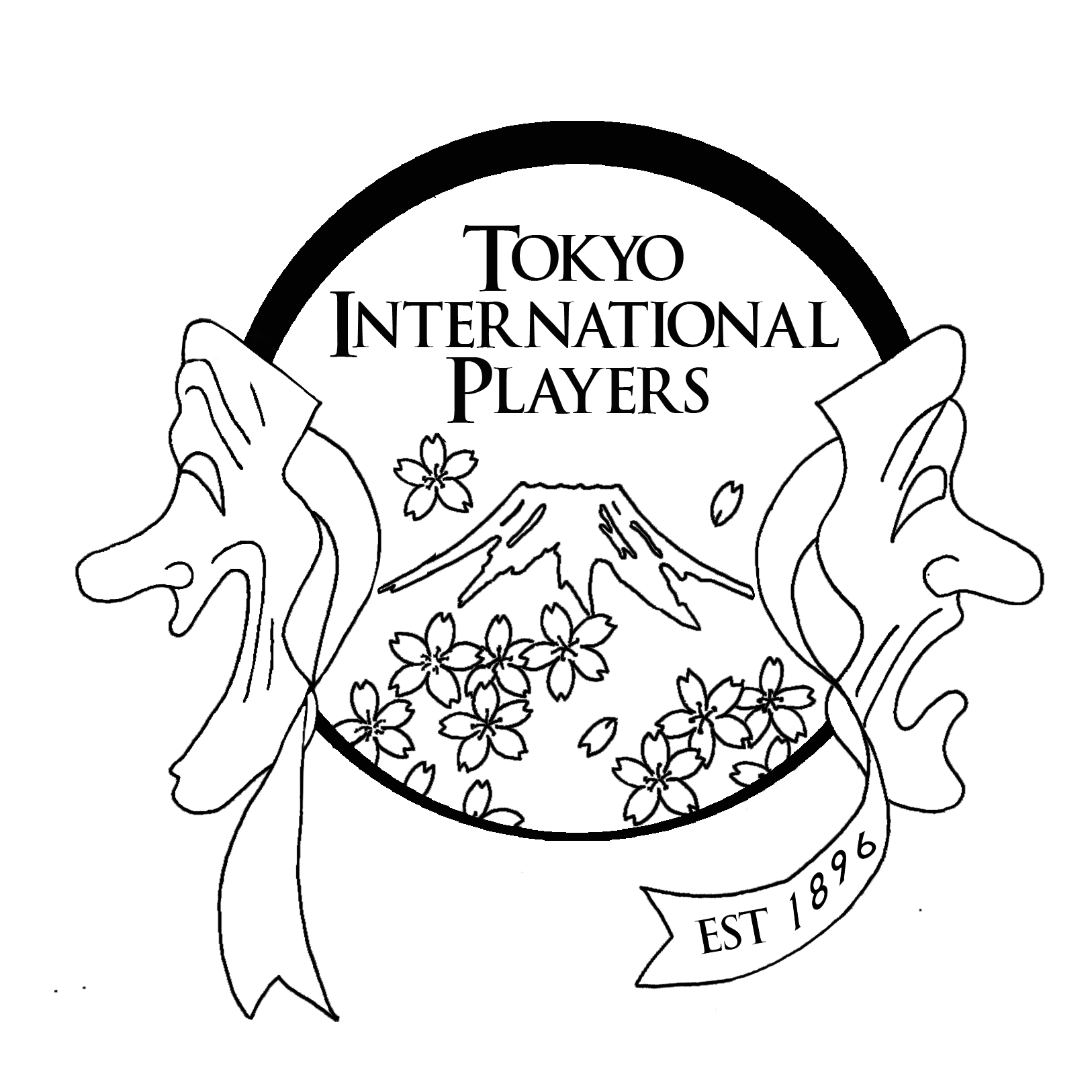
- TIP logo as of April 2010
- Formation: February 10, 1896
- Type: Theatre group
- Purpose: Community theatre
- Location: Japan
- Website: www.tokyoplayers.org

Tokyo International Players, also known as TIP, is the oldest, largest English-language theatre group in Japan and is among the oldest in Asia. TIP productions range from classics to musicals to contemporary and original pieces, in venues including Theater Sun-mall Shinjuku, Ebisu Echo Theater, Nakano Pocket Square, and Our Space in Hatagaya.

== History ==
February 10, 1896 marked the first general meeting of the Tokyo Dramatic and Musical Association—known today as Tokyo International Players. The group was formed at the original Imperial Hotel, Tokyo. Prominent among the roughly hundred people in attendance were the Chief of Mission of Belgium, Baron Albert D'Anethan, and his wife, the Baroness, who was one of the committee of nine Japanese and European men and women voted into office. The first committee meeting was held the following week at the Belgian Legation.

A Lesson in Love by Charles Smith Cheltnam was TIP's first production, with support from the Imperial House of Japan. Opening night was November 6, 1896, the theater was a university hall, and audience members arrived by rickshaw.

The family of Academy Award-winning actress sisters Olivia de Havilland and Joan Fontaine, (both born in Tokyo), were active in TIP. Their mother, Lilian Augusta Ruse (Lillian Fontaine), appeared in several productions, including the Arabian-Nights-themed drama Kismet in 1917.

In the period leading up to the Pacific War, Japanese authorities insisted on inspecting detailed translations of every play. By 1940, TIP was declared an espionage center and forced to disband. War-time bombings destroyed TIP records.

TIP was reorganized after the war when the Occupation forces made theaters available. "Procurement demands" ensured facilities for set construction and professional painting. In April 1949, the curtain rose on two one-act plays, Miss Fingernail by Beryl Kent and Hecuba by Euripides. Social traditions resumed, and opening nights, certainly until the early 1960s, were black-tie occasions.

Today, TIP generally presents four mainstage shows per season. In June 2009, TIP launched its "Second Stage" series with Honiefaith by Monty DiPietro. Second Stage features smaller-scale, black box-style productions. During the COVID-19 pandemic in 2020–2021, TIP shifted its focus to online programming, which included workshops and training opportunities for actors along with a festival of short plays.

== Theater facilities ==
The Frank Lloyd Wright-designed Imperial Hotel, Tokyo, one of the few buildings in Tokyo to withstand the 1923 Great Kantō earthquake, had an intimate theater which hosted the club until the early 1960s. Most TIP performances from 1974 to 2007 were staged in the Grand Ballroom of the Tokyo American Club.

Currently, TIP uses several professional theater spaces in the Tokyo metropolitan area including Theater Sun-mall in Shinjuku, Ebisu Echo Theater, Pocket Square in Nakano, and Our Space in Hatagaya. Rehearsals are held at various venues around Tokyo.

== Production history ==
Nov 1896: A Lesson in Love by Charles Smith Cheltnam

- Bombings during World War II destroyed TIP's pre-war records.

Apr 1949: Miss Fingernail by Beryl Kent, directed by George Mackie; Hecuba by Euripides, directed by Burton Crane
May 1949: Night Must Fall by Emlyn Williams
Oct 1949: The Madwoman of Chaillot by Jean Giraudoux, directed by Norman Earl Thomson
1951: The Silver Whistle by Robert E. MacEnroe
1952: Hay Fever by Noël Coward
1954: The Merchant of Venice by William Shakespeare
1955: The White Sheep of the Family by L. duGarde Peach and Ian Hay, Accent on Youth by Samson Raphaelson, Sabrina Fair by Samuel A. Taylor, The Importance of Being Earnest by Oscar Wilde
1956: The Caine County Court-Martial by Herman Wouk, Gaslight by Patrick Hamilton, The Women by Clare Boothe Luce, Amphitryon 38 by Jean Giraudoux
Oct 1956: The Happy Time by Samuel A. Taylor
Feb 1957: The Diary of Anne Frank by Frances Goodrich and Albert Hackett
Apr 1957: Twelfth Night by William Shakespeare, directed by Helen McAlpine
May 1957: Blithe Spirit by Noël Coward
Oct 1957: Born Yesterday by Garson Kanin
Feb 1958: The Love of Four Colonels by Peter Ustinov, directed by Donald Warren-Knott
May 1958: The Tiger at the Gate by Jean Giraudoux
Oct 1958: The Waltz of the Toreadors by Jean Anouilh, directed by George Furness
Dec 1958: Our Town by Thornton Wilder
Mar 1959: And Then There Were None by Agatha Christie
May 1959: The Playboy of the Western World by John Millington Synge
Oct 1959: The Lady's Not for Burning by Christopher Fry
Dec 1959: The Rainmaker by N. Richard Nash
Feb 1960: Witness for the Prosecution by Agatha Christie
May 1960: Breath of Spring by Peter Coke
Oct 1960: The Seven Year Itch by George Axelrod
Dec 1960: The Chalk Garden by Enid Bagnold, directed by Val Stavridi
Feb 1961: A Penny for a Song by John Whiting, directed by Brian Moore and Stuart Beaty
May 1961: The Marriage-Go-Round by Leslie Stevens
Oct 1961: Visit to a Small Planet by Gore Vidal
Dec 1961: The Andersonville Trial by Saul Levitt
Mar 1962: Macbeth by William Shakespeare, directed by Nicholas Spreckley
May 1962: Laura by George Skiar and Vera Caspary
Oct 1962: The Diary of a Scoundrel by Alexander Ostrovsky, directed by Peter Mann
Dec 1962: Morning's at Seven by Paul Osborn, directed by Ray Purl
Mar 1963: Arms and the Man by George Bernard Shaw, directed by Ken Macdonald
May 1963: The Winter's Tale by William Shakespeare, directed by John Mitchell
Nov 1963: The Glass Menagerie by Tennessee Williams, directed by Ray Purl
Dec 1963: The Importance of Being Earnest by Oscar Wilde, directed by Theo de Haan
Mar 1964: Send Me No Flowers by Norman Barasch and Carroll Moore, directed by George Furness May 1964; The Browning Version by Terence Rattigan, directed by Peter Dupere; Harlequinade by Terence Rattigan, directed by Charles Thompson
Nov 1964: Mary, Mary by Jean Kerr, directed by George Furness
Mar 1965: Bonaventure by Charlotte Hastings, directed by Peter Dupere
Jun 1965: I Am A Camera by John Van Druten, directed by James Ranger
Oct 1965: Lot's Wife, directed by Peter Mann
Dec 1965: Three Men on a Horse by John Cecil Holm and George Abbott, directed by Ray Purl
Mar 1966: Home and Beauty by W. Somerset Maugham, directed by James Ranger
Jun 1966: Rashomon by Fay Kanin and Michael Kanin, directed by Susan Austin & Nancy Etani
Nov 1966: A Man for All Seasons by Robert Bolt, directed by John Wetstine
Dec 1966: Charley's Aunt by Brandon Thomas, directed by Handel Evans and James Ranger
Mar 1967: The Miracle Worker by William Gibson, directed by Richard Via
Jun 1967: The Reluctant Debutante by William Douglas-Home, directed by James Ranger and Handel Evans
Sep 1967: scenes from Much Ado About Nothing by William Shakespeare and Romanoff and Juliet by Peter Ustinov (reading)
Oct 1967: Portrait of Murder by Robert Bloomfield, directed by Peter Dupere
Dec 1967: The Odd Couple by Neil Simon, directed by Richard Via & George Furness
Jan 1968: The Lady's Not for Burning by Christopher Fry, directed by Peter Mann (reading)
Feb 1968: The Odd Couple roadshow production to Nagoya & Kobe
Mar 1968: Twelfth Night by William Shakespeare, directed by Peter Mann
May 1968: The Marriage of Mr. Mississippi by Friedrich Dürrenmatt, directed by Ray Purl
Sep 1968: The Love of Four Colonels by Peter Ustinov (reading)
Oct 1968: You Know I Can't Hear You When the Water's Running by Robert Woodruff Anderson, directed by Ken Macdonald
Dec 1968: See How They Run by Philip King, directed by Handel Evans & Peter Dupere
Feb 1969: The Long Sunset by R. C. Sherriff, directed by Adrian Thorpe
Mar 1969: The Relapse by John Vanbrugh, directed by Verner Bickley
May 1969: Barefoot in the Park by Neil Simon, directed by George Furness & Bob Austin
Oct 1969: The Boys in the Band by Mart Crowley, directed by Ken Macdonald & Pat Kelly
Dec 1969: The Private Ear + White Lies + The Public Eye by Peter Shaffer, directed by Adrian Thorpe
Feb 1970: Blithe Spirit by Noël Coward directed by Nancy Rosenblum (reading)
Mar 1970: Everything in the Garden by Edward Albee, directed by Pat Kelly
May 1970: Little Murders by Jules Feiffer, directed by Ray & Marshie Purl
Sep 1970: People by Jules Feiffer (reading)
Oct 1970: Plaza Suite by Neil Simon, directed by Nancy Rosenblum & Bing Thompson
Nov 1970: Marriage à la mode by John Dryden (reading)
Dec 1970: The Real Inspector Hound by Tom Stoppard, directed by George Furness & Arthur Milne + Krapp's Last Tape by Samuel Beckett, directed by George Furness & Marshie Purl
Feb 1971: Madly in Love by Paul Abelman + scenes from Lovers and Other Strangers by Renée Taylor & Joseph Bologna, directed by Nancy Rosenblum & Pat Kelly (reading)
Mar 1971: After the Rain by John Bowen, directed by William Hall
Jun 1971: Lovers and Other Strangers by Renée Taylor & Joseph Bologna, directed by Bing Thompson
Oct 1971: Sheep on the Runway by Art Buchwald, directed by George Furness & Bruce Kennedy
Nov 1971: Anastasia, directed by Peter Benford & Fern Rafelson (reading)
Dec 1971: An Evening with Thurber & Feiffer by James Thurber & Jules Feiffer, dir by William Laws
Mar 1972: Play It Again, Sam by Woody Allen, directed by Fern Rafelson
May 1972: The Queen & the Rebels by Ugo Betti (reading)
Jun 1972: Gaslight by Patrick Hamilton, directed by Bob Austin
Oct 1972: The Homecoming by Harold Pinter, directed by George Furness & Arthur Milne
Nov 1972: The Complaisant Lover by Graham Greene (reading)
Dec 1972: Bell, Book and Candle by John Van Druten, directed by Ray & Marshie Purl
Mar 1973: I Spy by John Mortimer, directed by Colin Willis (reading)
May 1973: The Rimers of Eldritch by Lanford Wilson, directed by Shiro Kijima (in Japanese, sponsored by TIP)
Oct 1973: There's a Girl in My Soup by Terence Frisby, directed by Colin Willis (reading)
Nov 1973: The Mousetrap by Agatha Christie, directed by Ray & Marshie Purl
Dec 1973: A Christmas Carol by Charles Dickens, directed by Ray & Marshie Purl (reading)
Jan 1974: Oedipus at Colonus by Sophocles, directed by Peter Mann (workshop)
Feb 1974: Animal Farm by George Orwell, directed by William Laws & Candace Kennedy Laws (reading)
Mar 1974: How the Other Half Loves by Alan Ayckbourn, directed by Ray Purl
Apr 1974: Who'll Save the Ploughboy (reading)
May 1974: Green Julia (reading)
Oct 1974: Who's Afraid of Virginia Woolf? by Edward Albee, directed by Ken Macdonald (reading)
Nov 1974: Twigs by George Furth, directed by Ray Purl
Jan 1975: Home by David Storey, directed by Ken Macdonald & George Furness (reading)
Feb 1975: Waiting for Godot by Samuel Beckett, directed by Peter Mann (reading)
Mar 1975: Mystery Play by Jean Claude Van Itallie, directed by Ray Purl (workshop)
Apr 1975: High Spirits book, lyrics, & music by Hugh Martin and Timothy Gray, based on the play Blithe Spirit by Noël Coward, directed by Bob Austin
May 1975: The American Dream by Edward Albee, directed by Ray Purl (workshop)
Oct 1975: Master Dudley & Red for Danger by Philip Johnson + He's Dead All Right by John Gainfort, directed by Colin Williams (reading)
Nov 1975: The Comedy of Errors by William Shakespeare, directed by Ray & Marshie Purl
Dec 1975: The Amorous Pawn by Michael Lombardi, directed by Michael Lombardi (reading)
Jan 1976: Father Returns by Kikuchi Kan. English version directed by Colin Williams, Japanese version directed by Rocky Ishii (workshop)
Jan 1976: Kennedy's Children by Robert Patrick, directed by Ken Macdonald (reading)
Feb 1976: Spoon River Anthology by Edgar Lee Masters, directed by Rita Oldham
Mar 1976: The Three Sisters by Anton Chekhov, directed by Ray Purl
May 1976: It's a Lemon, written & compiled by Bob Austin & Colin Williams, directed by Bob Austin
Oct 1976: Otherwise Engaged by Simon Gray, directed by Ken Macdonald (reading)
Nov 1976: Absurd Person Singular by Alan Ayckbourn, directed by Ray Purl
Dec 1976: The Dock Brief by John Mortimer + The Stronger by August Strindberg, directed by Jim Bowers (workshop)
Jan 1977: Butterflies Are Free by Leonard Gershe, directed by Gordon Nebeker (workshop)
Feb 1977: Separate Tables by Terence Rattigan, directed by Jean Barmby (reading)
Mar 1977: The Importance of Being Earnest by Oscar Wilde, directed by Ray & Marshie Purl
May 1977: A Nun in the Family by Joe Grace, directed by Ray Purl (workshop)
Jun 1977: Antigone by Sophocles, directed by Jim Bowers (reading)
Oct 1977: Same Time, Next Year by Bernard Slade, directed by Bruce Kennedy (workshop)
Nov 1977: Night Watch by Lucille Fletcher, directed by Ken Macdonald
Dec 1977: Royal Gambit by Hermann Gressicker, directed by Helen Mohri (reading)
Jan 1978: The Heiress by Ruth & Augustus Goetz, directed by Margaret Grogan (workshop)
Feb 1978: Don Juan in Hell by George Bernard Shaw, directed by Jim Bowers (reading)
Mar 1978: The Last of the Red Hot Lovers by Neil Simon, directed by Joe Grace
Apr 1978: Dirty Linen by Tom Stoppard, directed by Ken Macdonald (reading)
May 1978: Under Milk Wood by Dylan Thomas, directed by Ivan Woodhouse (reading)
Jun 1978: Old Times by Harold Pinter, directed by Ivan Woodhouse (reading)
Nov 1978: The Sunshine Boys by Neil Simon, directed by Lillian McCloy
Dec 1978: A Christmas Carol by Charles Dickens, directed by Margaret Grogan (staged reading)
Jan 1979: The One Day of the Year by Alan Seymour, directed by Robin Parkinson-Bates (staged reading)
Feb 1979: The Glass Menagerie by Tennessee Williams, directed by Jim Bowers
Mar 1979: Bedroom Farce by Alan Ayckbourn, directed by Ivan Woodhouse
Apr 1979: The Constant Wife by W. Somerset Maugham, directed by Miranda Kenrick (staged reading)
May 1979: The Poker Session by Hugh Leonard, directed by Jeritza McCarter
Jun 1979: A Nice Clean Finish by Ian de Stains + scene from Lovers and Other Strangers by Renée Taylor and Joseph Bologna + Facing the Facts by Gene Lockhart, directed by Michael Fenton-Wingate
Sep 1979: Habeas Corpus by Alan Bennett, directed by Ivan Woodhouse (staged reading; Curtain Raiser)
Nov 1979: Candida by George Bernard Shaw, directed by Helen Mohri
Dec 1979: The Police by Sławomir Mrożek, directed by Margaret Grogan (staged reading)
Feb 1980: 6 Rms Riv Vu by Bob Randall, directed by Robert McCarter
Mar 1980: The Shadow Box by Michael Cristofer, directed by Tom Killough
Apr 1980: Table Manners by Alan Ayckbourn, directed by Ken Macdonald (staged reading)
May 1980: Pajama Tops by Mawby Greene and Ed Feilbert, directed by Jim Bowers
Sep 1980: The Oldest Living Graduate by Preston Jones, directed by Tom Killough (staged reading: curtain raiser)
Oct 1980: California Suite by Neil Simon, directed by Ivan Woodhouse
Nov 1980: Absent Friends by Alan Ayckbourn, directed by Margaret Grogan
Feb 1981: The Interview by Barry Bermange + In Camera by Jean-Paul Sartre, directed by David Warren (staged readings)
Mar 1981: Deathtrap by Ira Levin, directed by Jim Bowers
Apr 1981: Kings (selected scenes) by William Shakespeare, directed by Carol Moore
May 1981: The Good Doctor by Neil Simon, directed by Barbara Knode (staged reading)
Oct 1981: Dames at Sea by George Haimsohn and Robin Miller, directed by Judy Sackheim (staged reading: Curtain Raiser)
Nov 1981: The Prisoner of Second Avenue by Neil Simon, directed by Jim Bowers
Jan 1982: Vanities by Jack Heifner, directed by Joe Grace (staged reading)
Feb 1982: Tribute by Bernard Slade, directed by Barbara Knode
Mar 1982: A Delicate Balance by Edward Albee, directed by Tom Grange (staged reading)
Apr 1982: The Cherry Orchard by Anton Chekhov, directed by Ivan Woodhouse
May 1982: Close of Play by Simon Gray, directed by Margaret Grogan (staged reading)
Oct 1982: Little Mary Sunshine by Rick Besoyan, directed by Judy Sackheim (staged reading; Curtain Raiser)
Nov 1982: The Little Foxes by Lillian Hellman, directed by Barbara Knode
Jan 1983: The Imaginary Invalid by Molière, directed by Gordon Nebeker (staged reading)
Feb 1983: Habeas Corpus by Alan Bennett, directed by Ivan Woodhouse
Mar 1983: Sleuth by Anthony Shaffer, directed by David Allan (staged reading)
Apr 1983: I Ought to Be in Pictures by Neil Simon, directed by Jim Bowers
May 1983: The Primary English Class by Israel Horovitz, directed by Karen Handley (staged reading)
Oct 1983: Private Lives by Noël Coward, directed by Judy Sackheim (staged reading; Curtain Raiser)
Nov 1983: Wait Until Dark by Frederick Knott, directed by Barbara Knode
Jan 1984: Crimes of the Heart by Beth Henley, directed by Joe Grace
Feb 1984: 84, Charing Cross Road by Helene Hanff, directed by Ian de Stains (staged reading)
Mar 1984: The Lion in Winter by James Goldman, directed by Margaret Grogan
Apr 1984: Mixed Doubles (series of vignettes), directed by Judith Gai Maxwell (staged reading)
Oct 1984: The Real Thing by Tom Stoppard, directed by Ivan Woodhouse
Nov 1984: The Dining Room by A. R. Gurney, directed by Barbara Knode
Jan 1985: An Evening with Rodgers & Hart, directed by Judy Sackheim (staged reading; musical revue)
Feb 1985: Pack of Lies by Hugh Whitemore, directed by Ian de Stains
Mar 1985: Duet for One by Tom Kempinski, directed by Margaret Grogan (staged reading)
Apr 1985: Vanities by Jack Heifner, directed by Joe Grace
Oct 1985: Blithe Spirit by Noël Coward, directed by Ivan Woodhouse
Nov 1985: Close Ties by Elizabeth Diggs, directed by Barbara Knode
Jan 1986: Top Girls by Caryl Churchill, directed by Judith Gai Maxwell (staged reading)
Feb 1986: Side by Side by Sondheim by Stephen Sondheim, directed by Judy Sackheim
Mar 1986: 'night, Mother by Marsha Norman, directed by Hilary King (staged reading)
Apr 1986: The Gingerbread Lady by Neil Simon, directed by Ian de Stains
Oct 1986: A Lesson in Love by Charles Smith Cheltnam, directed by Colin Willis (staged reading)
Nov 1986: Lovers and Other Strangers by Renée Taylor & Joseph Bologna, directed by Joe Grace
Jan 1987: Talking With... by Jane Martin, directed by Barbara Simonetti & Julie Zaiser (staged reading)
Feb 1987: Betrayal by Harold Pinter, directed by Ivan Woodhouse
Mar 1987: An Inspector Calls by J. B. Priestley, directed by Charmian Norman-Taylor (staged reading)
Apr 1987: Our Town by Thornton Wilder, directed by Barbara Knode
Oct 1987: Lend Me a Tenor by Ken Ludwig, directed by Jonathan Malamud (Curtain Raiser)
Nov 1987: A Chorus of Disapproval by Alan Ayckbourn, directed by Ivan Woodhouse
Jan 1988: Agnes of God by John Pielmeier, directed by Don Dillon (staged reading)
Feb 1988: Unsung Cole by Cole Porter, directed by Judy Sackheim
Mar 1988: A Slight Ache by Harold Pinter + The Two Executioners by Fernando Arrabal + Catastrophe by Samuel Beckett, directed by Eric Sackheim (three one-act staged readings)
Apr 1988: Hedda Gabler by Henrik Ibsen, directed by Ian de Stains
Nov 1988: The Importance of Being Earnest by Oscar Wilde, directed by Ivan Woodhouse
Jan 1989: Action + Icarus's Mother by Sam Shepard, directed by Boomie Pedersen (studio production)
Feb 1989: Beyond Therapy by Christopher Durang, directed by Don Dillon
Mar 1989: A Kind of Alaska by Harold Pinter, directed by Margaret Grogan (studio production)
Apr 1989: Passion Play by Peter Nichols, directed by Ian de Stains
Sep 1989: Chapter Two by Neil Simon, directed by Malcolm Duff (Curtain Raiser)
Nov 1989: Dark of the Moon by Howard Richardson and William Berney, directed by Lyle Fisher
Dec 1989: 84, Charing Cross Road by Helene Hanff, directed by Martin McGee (studio production)
Feb 1990: The Cocktail Hour by A. R. Gurney, directed by Don Dillon
Mar 1990: A Walk in the Woods by Lee Blessing, directed by Wendy Farha-Bissell
Apr 1990: Private Lives by Noël Coward, directed by Ivan Woodhouse
Sep 1990: A Coupla White Chicks Sitting Around Talking by John Ford Noonan, directed by Shelli Place (Curtain Raiser)
Nov 1990: The Musical Comedy Murders of 1940 by John Bishop, directed by Lyle Fisher
Feb 1991: A Day in the Death of Joe Egg by Peter Nichols, directed by Malcolm Duff
Mar 1991: Eastern Standard by Richard Greenberg, directed by Boomie Pedersen (studio production)
May 1991: Amadeus by Peter Shaffer, directed by Martin McGee
Sep 1991: Good Evening by Dudley Moore and Peter Cook, directed by Ian de Stains (Curtain Raiser)
Oct 1991: Noises Off by Michael Frayn, directed by Ivan Woodhouse
Feb 1992: Uncle Vanya by Anton Chekhov, directed by Boomie Pedersen
Mar 1992: Bit by Bit, compiled & directed by Susan Oliver (musical review)
Apr 1992: Steel Magnolias by Robert Harling, directed by Shelli Place
Sep 1992: M. Butterfly by David Henry Hwang, directed by Lyle Fisher
Nov 1992: Ice Cream by Caryl Churchill, directed by Gregory Kalfas + Bargains by Jack Heifner, directed by Hamilton Armstrong (studio production)
Dec 1992: The Mousetrap by Agatha Christie, directed by Martin McGee
Feb 1993: A... My Name Is Alice by Joan Micklin Silver and Julianne Boyd, directed by Susan Oliver
Mar 1993: Blue Remembered Hills by Dennis Potter, directed by Joan McGee + Dandelion Wine by Ray Bradbury, directed by Patricia Wells (studio production)
May 1993: A Midsummer Night's Dream by William Shakespeare, directed by Malcolm Duff
Oct 1993: Educating Rita by Willy Russell, directed by Ian de Stains
Nov 1993: Love Letters by A. R. Gurney, directed by Don Dillon (studio production)
Dec 1993: The Fantasticks, music by Harvey Schmidt, lyrics by Tom Jones, directed by Lyle Fisher
Feb 1994: Pygmalion by George Bernard Shaw, directed by Ivan Woodhouse & Judy Fisher
Mar 1994: Burn This by Lanford Wilson, directed by Scott Sullivan (studio production)
May 1994: Rumors by Neil Simon, directed by Patricia Wells
Sep 1994: Greater Tuna by Jaston Williams, Joe Sears, and Ed Howard, directed by Leo Glenn
Dec 1994: Little Shop of Horrors, music by Alan Menken, book by Howard Ashman, directed by Susan Oliver
Feb 1995: The Glass Menagerie by Tennessee Williams, directed by Hamilton Armstrong
Mar 1995: The Tinker's Wedding & In the Shadow of the Glen by John Millington Synge, directed by Geraldine Twilley (studio production)
May 1995: The Foreigner by Larry Shue, directed by Judy Fisher
Sep 1995: Brighton Beach Memoirs by Neil Simon, directed by Scott Sullivan
Dec 1995: A Christmas Carol by Charles Dickens, directed by Hank Roberts
Feb 1996: The Amorous Flea by Jerry Devine, directed by Judy Fisher
Apr 1996: A Lie in the Mind by Sam Shepard, directed by Walter Roberts
May 1996: Zigger Zagger by Peter Terson, directed by Malcolm Duff
Sep 1996: I Hate Hamlet by Paul Rudnick, directed by Hank Roberts
Nov 1996: Deathtrap by Ira Levin, directed by Judy Fisher
Feb 1997: The Taming of the Shrew by William Shakespeare, directed by Malcolm Duff
Apr 1997: If We Are Women by Joanna McClelland Glass, directed by Virginia Kouyoumdjian (workshop)
May 1997: Nunsense by Dan Goggin, directed by Lyle Fisher
Sep 1997: How the Other Half Loves by Alan Ayckbourn, directed by Jennie Preece
Nov 1997: The Lion in Winter by James Goldman, directed by Scott Sullivan
Feb 1998: The Boys from Syracuse by Rodgers and Hart, directed by Hank Roberts
Apr 1998: The Deadly Game by James Yaffe, directed by Patricia Wells (studio production)
May 1998: Dancing at Lughnasa by Brian Friel, directed by Virginia Kouyoumdjian
Sep 1998: Love Off the Shelf by Roger Hall, directed by Colin McCulloch
Nov 1998: Lettice and Lovage by Peter Shaffer, directed by Jennie Preece
Feb 1999: One Flew Over the Cuckoo's Nest by Dale Wasserman, directed by Malcolm Duff
Apr 1999: Twelfth Night by William Shakespeare, directed by Robert Otey (reading)
May 1999: Whodunnit by Anthony Shaffer, directed by Janet Thompson
Sep 1999: The Odd Couple by Neil Simon, directed by Brian Haigh
Nov 1999: The Best Christmas Pageant Ever by Barbara Robinson, directed by Hank Roberts
Feb 2000: Picasso at the Lapin Agile by Steve Martin, directed by Carla Lev
Apr 2000: Cole! Musical Revue by Cole Porter, dir by Hank Roberts
May 2000: Private Lives by Noël Coward, directed by Colin McCulloch
Oct 2000: Lend Me a Tenor by Ken Ludwig, directed by Janet Thompson
Nov 2000: Dracula by Hamilton Deane & John L. Balderston, from the novel by Bram Stoker, directed by Hank Roberts
Mar 2001: Shakespeare for Dummies compiled and directed by Tim Evans
May 2001: Inherit the Wind by Jerome Lawrence & Robert Edwin Lee, directed by Malcolm Duff
Oct 2001: Godspell by Stephen Schwartz, directed by David Neale
Jan 2002: The Nerd by Larry Shue, directed by John Owens
Mar 2002: The Importance of Being Earnest by Oscar Wilde, directed by Leslie de Giere
May 2002: California Suite by Neil Simon, directed by John Owens
Oct 2002: What the Butler Saw by Joe Orton, directed by Leslie de Giere
Mar 2003: You're a Good Man, Charlie Brown, book, music & lyrics by Clark Gesner, directed by Renato Brandao, musical direction by April Hayes
May 2003: Dial M for Murder by Frederick Knott, directed by Robert Tsonos
Oct 2003: Blithe Spirit by Noël Coward, directed by John Owens
Jan 2004: Proof by David Auburn, directed by Robert Tsonos
Mar 2004: The Dining Room by A. R. Gurney, directed by David Neale
May 2004: Fiddler on the Roof music by Jerry Bock, lyrics by Sheldon Harnick, directed by Lenne Hardt, musical direction by Joseph Amato
Oct 2004: A Doll's House by Henrik Ibsen, directed by Robert Tsonos
Jan 2005: Les Liaisons Dangereuses by Christopher Hampton, based on the novel by Pierre Choderlos de Laclos, directed by Jamie McInnes
Mar 2005: Six Characters in Search of a Hamlet by William Shakespeare, adaptation by Terry Hakes, directed by Terry Hakes
May 2005: Steel Magnolias by Robert Harling, directed by Rachel Walzer
Oct 2005: Arcadia by Tom Stoppard, directed by Conor Hanratty
Jan 2006: The Cherry Orchard by Anton Chekhov, directed by Malcolm Duff
Mar 2006: Dinner with Friends by Donald Margulies, directed by Rachel Walzer
May 2006: The Best Little Whorehouse in Texas, music and lyrics by Carol Hall, book by Larry L. King and Peter Masterson, directed by Robb Dahlke, musical direction by Jessica Winter
Oct 2006: And Then There Were None by Agatha Christie, directed by Robb Dahlke
Jan 2007: Moon Over Buffalo by Ken Ludwig, directed by Rachel Walzer
Mar 2007: Death of a Salesman by Arthur Miller, directed by Chris Parham
May 2007: The Pirates of Penzance, music by Arthur Sullivan, libretto by W.S. Gilbert, directed by Lou McLeod
Oct 2007: The Elephant Man by Bernard Pomerance, directed by Hamilton Armstrong
Feb 2008: Plaza Suite by Neil Simon, directed by Bob Werley
May 2008: A Funny Thing Happened on the Way to the Forum, music and lyrics by Stephen Sondheim, book by Burt Shevelove and Larry Gelbart, directed by Jonah Hagans
Sep 2008: Guards! Guards!, from the novel by Terry Pratchett, script by Stephen Briggs, directed by Frances Somerville
Dec 2008: Schweyk in the Second World War by Bertolt Brecht, directed by Chris Parham
Apr 2009: William Shakespeare's R3 by William Shakespeare, adapted by Alec Harris, directed by Andrew Woolner (joint production with Yokohama Theatre Group)
May 2009: Oliver!, music and lyrics by Lionel Bart, directed by Lou McLeod
Jul 2009: Honiefaith by Monty DiPietro, directed by Jonah Hagans (Second Stage production)
Sep 2009: Greater Tuna by Jaston Williams, Joe Sears, and Ed Howard, directed by Andrew Martínez (Second Stage production)
Sep 2009: If the Shoe Fits by Matt Thompson, Matt Chiorini, and Dana Vermette, directed by Bob Werley (Second Stage production)
Oct 2009: Little Shop of Horrors, music by Alan Menken, book by Howard Ashman, directed by Jonah Hagans
Dec 2009: Mrs. Bob Cratchit's Wild Christmas Binge by Christopher Durang, directed by Ron Scott
Feb 2010: Of Mice and Men by John Steinbeck, directed by Rachel Walzer
May 2010: Pippin, music and lyrics by Stephen Schwartz, book by Roger O. Hirson, directed by Jon Reimer
Oct 2010: A Midsummer Night's Dream by William Shakespeare, directed by Jonah Hagans
Dec 2010: Tartuffe by Molière, directed by Andrew Woolner (co-production with Yokohama Theatre Group)
Feb 2011: Picasso at the Lapin Agile by Steve Martin, directed by Kellie Holway
May 2011: Once Upon a Mattress, music by Mary Rodgers, lyrics by Marshall Barer, book by Jay Thompson, Marshall Barer and Dean Fuller, directed by Jon Reimer
Sep 2011: The Metamorphosis by Steven Berkoff, directed by Davina McFadyen
Oct 2011: The Woman in Black by Stephen Mallatratt, based the novel by Susan Hill, directed by Jonah Hagans
Dec 2011: A Kabuki Christmas Carol by Gary Perlman, directed by Jon Reimer (WORLD PREMIERE)
Mar 2012: The Crucible by Arthur Miller, directed by Ed Gilmartin
May 2012: The Wizard of Oz by L. Frank Baum, book by John Kane, music by Harold Arlen, lyrics by E.Y. Harburg, directed by Jonah Hagans
June 2012; Intimate Apparel by Lynn Nottage, directed by Sonja Inge (Second Stage production)
Sep 2012: Comedy Festival of One Acts, produced by Jon Reimer, featuring: 15-Minute Hamlet by Tom Stoppard, directed by Andrew Martinez; Controlling Interest by Wayne S. Rawley, directed by Ed Gilmartin; Dog Sees God: Confessions of a Teenage Blockhead by Bert V. Royal, directed by Lou McLeod; The Actor's Nightmare by Christopher Durang, directed by Ron Scott; The Real Inspector Hound by Tom Stoppard, directed by Jonah Hagans
Dec 2012: Alice, based on the story by Lewis Carroll, directed by Liam Shea
Mar 2013: Waiting for Godot by Samuel Beckett, directed by Davina McFadyen and Jonah Hagans
May 2013: Into the Woods, music & lyrics by Stephen Sondheim, book by James Lapine, directed by Jon Reimer
June 2013: Burn This by Lanford Wilson, directed by Alysha Haran (Second Stage co-production with Neptune Theatre Company)
Oct 2013: Avenue Q, music and lyrics by Robert Lopez and Jeff Marx, book by Jeff Whitty, directed by Jonah Hagans
Nov 2013: No Time to Wait, written and directed by Mike Kanert (Second Stage production)
Dec 2013: Night Must Fall by Emlyn Williams, directed by Hannah Weakley
Feb 2014: title of show, music and lyrics by Jeff Bowen, book by Hunter Bell, directed by Jonah Hagans and Alysha Haran (Second Stage co-production with Dirigible Productions)
Mar 2014: Romeo and Juliet by William Shakespeare, directed by Wendell T. Harrison
May 2014: The Mystery of Edwin Drood, music, lyrics, and book by Rupert Holmes, directed by Davina McFadyen
Oct 2014: Chess, music by Benny Andersson and Björn Ulvaeus, lyrics by Tim Rice, directed by Jonah Hagans
Dec 2014: A Tuna Christmas by Jaston Williams, Joe Sears, and Ed Howard, directed by Andrew Martínez (Second Stage production)
Dec 2014: Little Women by Louisa May Alcott, adapted and directed by Alysha Haran
Feb 2015: A Flea in Her Ear by Georges Feydeau, translated by John Mortimer, directed by Michelle Yamazaki
May 2015: The Secret Garden based on the novel by Frances Hodgson Burnett, book and lyrics by Marsha Norman, music by Lucy Simon, directed by Alysha Haran
Jun 2015: Condorguy by Ken Clement, directed by Jonah Hagans (Second Stage production)
Oct 2015: Richard O'Brien's The Rocky Horror Show, music, lyrics, and book by Richard O'Brien, directed by Jonah Hagans
Jan 2016: The Goat, or Who Is Sylvia? by Edward Albee, directed by Ross Williams (Second Stage co-production with Neptune Theatre Company)
Feb 2016: The Language Archive by Julia Cho, directed by Brian Berdanier
May 2016: Big River: The Adventures of Huckleberry Finn, music and lyrics by Roger Miller, book by William Hauptman, directed by Hannah Grace
Jun 2016: Free at Last: Life Beyond the River, written and directed by Wendell T. Harrison (WORLD PREMIERE Second Stage co-production with Tokyo Artistic Theatre Ensemble)
Oct 2016: The Tragedy of Macbeth by William Shakespeare, directed by Graig Russell
Feb 2017: Speaking in Tongues by Andrew Bovell, directed by Kimie Mizuno
May 2017: The Diary of Anne Frank by Frances Goodrich and Albert Hackett, newly adapted by Wendy Kesselman, directed by Jonah Hagans
Oct 2017: Sweeney Todd: The Demon Barber of Fleet Street, music and lyrics by Stephen Sondheim, book by Hugh Wheeler, directed by Davina McFadyen
Mar 2018: The Two Gentlemen of Verona by William Shakespeare, directed Brian Berdanier
May 2018: The Who's Tommy, music and lyrics by Pete Townshend, book by Des McAnuff, directed by Jonah Hagans
Jun 2018: Songs for a New World, music and lyrics by Jason Robert Brown, directed by Karen Pauley (Second Stage co-production with Say Nothing)
Oct 2018: The Good Person of Szechwan by Bertolt Brecht, translated by John Willett, directed by Graig Russell-Goto
Feb 2019: Hand to God by Robert Askins, directed by Jonah Hagans
May 2019: Chitty Chitty Bang Bang music and lyrics by Richard M. Sherman and Robert B. Sherman adapted for the stage by Jeremy Sams, directed by Karen Pauley
Oct 2019: Spring Awakening, book and lyrics by Steven Sater, music by Duncan Sheik, based on the play by Frank Wedekind, directed by Marita Stryker
Oct 2020: Cozy Reads by Jessie Berman, Andrea Ewald, Elizabeth Keel, Daniel Maloney, Ian Martin, Kimie Mizuno, Alex Page, Evan Spreen, and CC Ziegler, produced by Lizzie Howard, Marie Kuroda, and Kimie Mizuno (online reading event)
May 2021: Cozy Reads: Chapter 2 by Jessie Berman, Armelle Lajus, Alex Ohannessian, Alex Page, and Carlos Quiapo, produced by Lizzie Howard and Kimie Mizuno (online reading event)
Oct 2021: Natural Shocks by Lauren Gunderson, directed by Karen Pauley (staged reading)
Dec 2021: Constellations by Nick Payne, directed by Xander Coleman (staged reading)
May 2022: Cock by Mike Bartlett, directed by Karen Pauley (staged reading)
Oct 2022: John Hemstock Black by Alexander Page, directed by Karen Pauley (staged reading)
May 2023: Pride and Prejudice by Kate Hamill, based on the novel by Jane Austen, directed by Xander Coleman
Oct 2023: I Love You, You're Perfect, Now Change, book and lyrics by Joe DiPietro, music by Jimmy Roberts, orchestrations by Doug Katsaros, directed by Jon Reimer
May 2024: Beauty and the Beast by Laurence Boswell, music by Mick Sands, directed by Karen Pauley
Oct 2024: The Tempest by William Shakespeare, directed by Michelle Yamazaki
Feb 2025: in a word by Lauren Yee, directed by Brian Berdanier (staged reading)
May 2025: Seussical™, music by Stephen Flaherty, lyrics by Lynn Ahrens, book by Lynn Ahrens and Stephen Flaherty, co-conceived by Lynn Ahrens, Stephen Flaherty, and Eric Idle, based on the works of Dr. Seuss, and directed by Karen Pauley
Oct 2025: Baskerville: A Sherlock Holmes Mystery by Ken Ludwig, directed by Michelle Yamazaki
Feb 2026: Lemons Lemons Lemons Lemons Lemons by Sam Steiner, directed by Kate Cwynar
May 2026: Evita by Tim Rice and Andrew Lloyd Webber, directed by Jon Reimer
October 2026: Jonquil: The Legend of Love and the Turning Seasons, book and lyrics by Saori Gonoi; music by Ko Kamakura, Takachika Ehara, Mion Nazakura, and Saori Gonoi; translated and directed by Jazlaan Karshis

== See also ==
- Community theatre
- Performing arts
