= Be My Baby (disambiguation) =

"Be My Baby" is a single by the Ronettes.

Be My Baby may also refer to:

== Literature ==
- Be My Baby (book), by Ronnie Spector, 1990
- Be My Baby (Amanda Whittington play), 1997
- Be My Baby (Ken Ludwig play), 2005

== Music ==
- "Be My Baby", by Dick & Dee Dee, 1965
- "Be My Baby", by Ringo Starr from Old Wave, 1983
- "Be My Baby" (Vanessa Paradis song), 1992
- "Be My Baby", by Whigfield from Whigfield III, 2000
- "Be My Baby", by Motörhead from Kiss Of Death, 2006
- "Be My Baby", by Wonder Girls from Wonder World, 2011
- "Be My Baby", by Ariana Grande from My Everything, 2014

== Television ==
- "Be My Baby" (The Flash), a 1991 episode
- "Be My Baby" (Roseanne), a 1993 episode
- Be My Baby (web series), a 2019–2020 Thai web series

== See also ==
- " Take Me Home Tonight" (song), by Eddie Money, sometimes known as "Take Me Home Tonight (Be My Baby)" due to the end of the song's chorus
