= Doreen Simmons =

English sumo commentator (1932–2018)

- Born: Doreen Sylvia Clarke; 29 May 1932; Nottingham, Nottinghamshire, England
- Died: 23 April 2018 (aged 85); Tokyo, Japan
- Education: Girton College, Cambridge Hughes Hall, Cambridge
- Occupations: Writer, lecturer, commentator
- Known for: Sumo commentary

Doreen Sylvia Simmons (née Clarke; 29 May 1932 – 23 April 2018) was an English sumo commentator. After moving to Japan in 1973, she became an expert on sumo and was hired by NHK in 1992 to provide commentary for their English-language sumo broadcasts. She was awarded the Order of the Rising Sun in 2017.

== Early life ==
She was born in Nottingham, England, the daughter of a civil servant and a store manager. She attended Mundella Grammar School and sang in its choir. She was a keen follower of cricket as a teenager and would visit Trent Bridge cricket ground every Saturday.

She studied theology and classics at Girton College, Cambridge, and Hughes Hall, Cambridge from 1950 to 1954.

== Career ==
After graduation from college, she became a Latin and Greek teacher. She spent much of the 1960s teaching at a British Army school in Singapore, where she married. She made a three-month visit to rural Japan, where she stayed on a farm and saw her first sumo match on television during the March tournament of 1968. After returning to England, she taught classics and was a contestant in the first series of Mastermind, before deciding to return to Japan five years after her previous visit, securing a teaching post there in September 1973.

She worked at the International Language Centre in Jinbōchō, Tokyo, and then joined the Foreign press Center, editing translations of Foreign Ministry press releases. She also checked English language material for both the House of Representatives and the House of Councillors in the National Diet, and the National Diet Library.

=== Sumo commentary ===
It was while working for the Foreign Press Center that Simmons first developed an interest in sumo.

She saw her first live sumo match in January 1974 and began to regularly attend tournaments in Tokyo, Osaka and Nagoya. She wrote a bi-monthly sumo column for Kansai Time Out from 1983 and was a contributor to Sumo World magazine from 1987. In 1985, she revised the book Sumo: From Rite to Sport, originally published in 1979 by Patricia Cuyler. In 1992, she became a commentator for national broadcaster NHK, on their newly established English language sumo broadcasts. She was hired for her specialist knowledge to complement NHK's play-by-play commentators, who were more familiar with baseball broadcasts. In 2017, she celebrated her 25th year commentating for NHK, and she was awarded the Order of the Rising Sun for her contribution to sumo. She lived in Sumida, Tokyo in sumo's heartland of Ryōgoku. She was a financial sponsor of Dewanoumi stable, one of the many training stables or heya for over 20 years, and had friendships with many sumo wrestlers and officials.

Simmons hoped to write the definitive English-language book on sumo, despite how vast the subject is, but this venture was never completed.

== Other interests ==
Simmons sang in Tokyo's British Embassy Choir. She also performed with the Tokyo International Players. She was a percussionist, playing the bodhrán and the djembe. She became a member of the Asiatic Society of Japan in 1980 and later served for some years on the ASJ Council. She went bungee jumping in Australia at age 68 and as a volunteer for Habitat for Humanity helped dig foundations for homes in Mongolia on her 71st birthday.

== Personal life ==
Her marriage to Bob Simmons had ended in divorce, and she had no children. She long resided in the Sumida area of Tokyo. An Anglican, she was a long-time parishioner of St. Alban's Church in Minato.

=== Death ===
Simmons died at her on 23 April 2018 at the age of 85, of a pulmonary condition.
