= Jessie Cannizzaro =

American actress

- Born: New York City, U.S.
- Education: Bronx High School of Science; Swarthmore College
- Occupations: Actress, singer, comedy writer
- Years active: 2012–present
- Known for: Puffs
- Website: www.jessiecannizzaro.com

Jessie Cannizzaro is an American actress, best known for her roles in the long-running off-Broadway comedy Puffs, or Seven Increasingly Eventful Years at a Certain School of Magic and Magic and the Amazon Studios feature film Selah and the Spades.

== Life and career ==
Cannizzaro was born in New York City, where she was student body president at the Bronx High School of Science. She went on to study Theater and Political Science at Swarthmore College.

In 2015, Cannizzaro originated the role of Sally Perks/Others in the long-running off-Broadway play Puffs, or Seven Increasingly Eventful Years at a Certain School of Magic and Magic, which was filmed and screened in movie theaters nationwide via Fathom Events and later released on Amazon Prime Video, iTunes, and BroadwayHD. She also originated the role of Thalia in two-time Olivier Award-winning playwright Ken Ludwig's The Gods of Comedy, a co-production between McCarter Theatre and Old Globe Theatre. Cannizzaro is also known for her work in the 2019 Sundance Film Festival feature Selah and the Spades and the Nick Jr. Channel children's television series Nella the Princess Knight.

== Filmography ==
=== Film ===
Year	Title	Role	Notes
2012	A Girl and Her Guardian	Sarah	Short Film
2012	Honey and Trombones	Sica	Short Film
2014	Broadway Classics: Two Pairs and a Pod	Laura	Short Film
2014	A Run in the Park	Woman	Short Film
2015	My Little Red/Green Coat	Jessie	Short Film
2018	Puffs: Filmed Live Off Broadway	Sally Perks/Others	Feature Film
2019	Selah and the Spades	Narrator	Feature Film

=== Television ===
Year	Title	Role	Notes
2013	Losing It with John Stamos	Denise's Sister	Episode: "Denise Richards"
2016	Urban Teach Now	Becca	Episode: "Pilot"
2017	Quiet Tiny Asian	Jessica	Episode: "Tiny Problems"
2019	Nella the Princess Knight	Buttercup	Episode: "Trinket's Bad Hair Day"
2019	KUSI-TV	Self – Guest	Episode: "The Gods of Comedy"

== Theatre ==
Year	Title	Role	Notes
2017	Puffs, or Seven Increasingly Eventful Years at a Certain School of Magic and Magic	Sally Perks / Others	New World Stages
2019	The Gods of Comedy	Thalia	McCarter Theatre
2019	The Gods of Comedy	Thalia	Old Globe Theatre
