= Matteo Pistono =

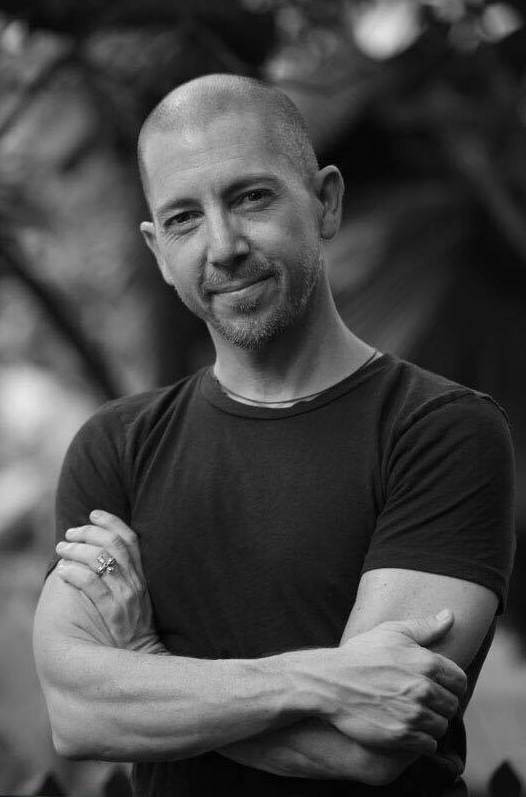
- Born: Wyoming, US
- Education: Master of Arts
- Occupations: author, teacher
- Writing career
- Language: English
- Notable works: Meditation: Coming to Know Your Mind In the Shadow of the Buddha and Fearless in Tibet: The Life of the Mystic Tertön Sogyal
- Website: matteopistono.com

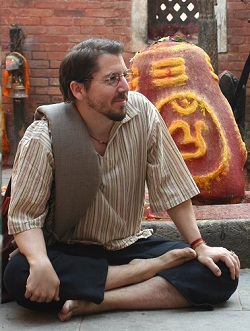
Matteo Pistono- Pashupatinath, Nepal in 2009

Matteo (Matthew) Pistono is a writer, teacher of meditation, and student of engaged Buddhism. He is the author of "Roar: Sulak Sivaraksa and the Path of Socially Engaged Buddhism" (forthcoming 2018), Fearless in Tibet: The Life of the Mystic Tertön Sogyal (Hay House, 2014) and In the Shadow of the Buddha: Secret Journeys, Sacred Histories, and Spiritual Discovery in Tibet (Dutton-Penguin, 2011), and has written about Tibetan, Himalayan, and Southeast Asian cultural, political, and spiritual landscapes for a number of outlets including The Washington Post, Global Post, Tricycle: The Buddhist Review, Lion's Roar, BBC's In-Pictures, Men's Journal, Kyoto Journal, and Himal Southasian.

== Biography ==
Pistono was born to Italian–Irish parents and raised in Wyoming where he completed his undergraduate degree in Anthropology at the University of Wyoming. In 1997, he gained a Master of Arts degree in Indian philosophy at the School of Oriental and African Studies in London. His teacher at SOAS was the famous Russian philosopher Alexander Piatigorsky. After working with the Smithsonian Institution in Washington, D.C., on Tibetan cultural programs, he lived and traveled throughout the Himalayas. During this time he documented evidence of human rights abuses in Tibet.

Pistono has studied meditation extensively with Tibetan Buddhist teachers, and shares meditation and pranayama techniques in Washington, D.C. He is the founder of Nekorpa, a foundation working to protect pilgrimage sites around the world, and he sits on the executive council of the International Network of Engaged Buddhists.

== Bibliography ==
=== Books ===
- Roar: Sulak Sivaraksa and the Path of Socially Engaged Buddhism, forthcoming 2018.
- Meditation: Coming To Know The Mind, Hay House, October 2017.
- Fearless in Tibet: The Life of the Mystic Tertön Sogyal, Hay House, May 2014. ISBN 978-1401941468
- In the Shadow of the Buddha: Secret Journeys, Sacred Histories, and Spiritual Discovery in Tibet, Dutton, 2011. ISBN 978-0525951193
- “Engaged Buddhism” in Michael Buckley, Tibet: Travel Guide. Bradt Travel Guides. April, 2012.
- “The Hidden Shrine and Empty Picture Frame” (pg. 29-34) in Incomparable Warriors: Non-violent Resistance in Contemporary Tibet. ICT. 2005.
- “Tolerance and Totalization: Religion in Contemporary” in Travelers to Tibet: A Selection of Eyewitness Accounts by Tibetans and Others (From 1959 to 2004). The Department of Information and International Relations, DIIR Central Tibetan Administration. 2004.
- (As editor) The Dalai Lama. Eight Verses for Training the Mind. Boston: Wisdom Publications. 1999.

=== Magazines And Journals ===
Inquiring Mind

- Issue 29. Spring 2013. Gomchen (Poetry)

Kyoto Journal

- Issue 76. Summer 2011. Restoring Dignity. Jungle Hermit in Sri Lanka. Page 97-100.
- Issue 74. 2010. Silk Roads; Samarkand to Nara. “Alexander Csoma de Kőrösi – The Grandfather of Modern Day Tibetan Translation”
- Issue 71. 2008. Tea – a glimpse, a journey. “Sri Lanka Pilgrimage” pages 60–63 and “Masala Chai” page 40.

Kyoto Journal online

- 2011 http://www.kyotojournal.org/wp-content/uploads/2011/07/kj75_pilgrims-conservationists_pistono.pdft
- March 2013 Thttps://web.archive.org/web/20170306211736/http://www.kyotojournal.org/the-journal/heart-work/the-engaged-buddhism-of-sulak-sivaraksa/

HIMAL South Asia

- September 2002. “Tolerance and Totalisation; Religion in Contemporary Tibet.” Pg 21-25
- September 2002. “Satyagraha In Exile” (pg 28-29) (Pistono interviews Prime Minister Samdhong Rinpoche)
