= Murder on the Orient Express (play) =

2017 play

Murder on the Orient Express is a play by Ken Ludwig adapted from the novel of the same name by Agatha Christie. Commissioned by Agatha Christie Limited, the work was written by Ludwig in 2015. Debuted in 2017, it was the first stage play featuring Hercule Poirot to premiere in more than 75 years; with Arnold Ridley's 1940 play Peril at End House being the last play to feature Poirot previously.

Murder on the Orient Express premiered at the McCarter Theatre in Princeton, New Jersey on March 14, 2017. The production used set designs by Beowulf Boritt, and starred Allan Corduner as Hercule Poirot. A revised version of the play premiered at the Hartford Stage on February 15, 2018. This production starred David Pittu as Poirot. The work has since been performed at many theaters in the United States and internationally.
