= Puffs, or Seven Increasingly Eventful Years at a Certain School of Magic and Magic =

Comedy theatre play by Matt Cox

- Off-Broadway Playbill cover
- Written by: Matt Cox
- Original language: English
- Genre: Comedy
- Setting: A Certain School of Magic and Magic

Premiere
- Date premiered: December 3, 2015
- Place premiered: Off-Off-Broadway at The People's Improv Theater in New York City, New York
- http://www.puffstheplay.com

Puffs, or Seven Increasingly Eventful Years at a Certain School of Magic and Magic is a 2015 original comedy play by New York–based playwright Matt Cox. The play is a parody of the Harry Potter book series by J. K. Rowling, but from the perspective of the "Puffs": that is, members of the Hogwarts house, Hufflepuff.

The play premiered at The People's Improv Theater on December 3, 2015. It moved to the Off-Broadway theater New World Stages in 2016. The show has been praised for its comedy and staging. It was nominated for the Off-Broadway Alliance Award for "Best Unique Theatrical Experience" in 2017.

== Background ==
Cox told SyFy Wire that he was currently working on another show he had written and worked on with McCarthy called "Kapow – i GoGo", a play split into three parts that ran about 4.5 hours when put together about different nerdy cartoons, franchises, and "sci-fi stuff" (Cox's words). He tells reporter, Lisa Granshaw, that he came up with the idea for Puffs on a subway ride one night home. He thought to himself "it would've been really terrible to be another student at that particular magic school whenever Harry was there." The whole ride home, he thought about that idea and how every year something bad would happen all because of Potter. He then began to piece together some other ideas from '90s pop-culture references and funny movie flaws that could be an entertaining play. As he began to think about it more, he thought about how easy it would be to sell to "anyone who has never been destined to save the world" (words from the BroadwayHD description of the show).

"Soon after," he says, "we did a reading, which was fun to put together. We kept tweaking it until we moved from the People's Improv Theater to the Elektra and now New World Stages, and it's been a fun time." He told Granshaw that the hardest part about creating the show was to cram seven books, movies, and all the humor into a show that actually wouldn't run for five hours (a line said by the narrator at the beginning of the show). The next step was to make sure that all the characters were interesting and had depth.

Granshaw asked if the play having moved to several different locations changed staging and the play itself. Cox told her that it did because, as each theater grew in popularity, it also grew in size and stage space. He and McCarthy, of course, found it challenging to make it bigger and grander but remain exciting and interesting, therefore using the technique of the different doors.

When asked what it was like balancing the humor and serious bits of the show, Cox responded: "That was one of the most important things when we were developing the show, that it still had that sense of really true heart to it, just because, similar to what I was saying earlier, that way it doesn't just feel like a parody, which would have been very easy to do. That way it's something that sticks with you, that sense of heart. We all come from theater backgrounds, and it was the only way to make it feel like it was an actual story in the same way the books and movies are. The reason they've lasted this long is because there's so many relatable things and putting that in and having there be a reason this story is being told."

== Productions ==
=== Off-Off-Broadway ===
Puffs opened on December 3, 2015, at the off-off-Broadway theater, The People's Improv Theater in New York City, New York, directed by Kristin McCarthy Parker and was scheduled to be just a five-night run. Co-produced by Stephen Stout and Colin Waitt, the production starred Zac Moon, Langston Belton, Julie Ann Earls, A.J. Ditty, Evan Maltby, Madeleine Bundy, Nick Carlillo, Jessie Cannizzaro, Stephen Stout, Eleanor Philips, and Andy Miller. The theater saw how well Puffs was doing and decided to extend the run. It ultimately ran for eight months.

=== Off-Broadway ===
In late 2015 during the very beginning of the performances, Tilted Windmills Theatricals under the direction of Tony-nominated producer David Carpenter decided to option the play from Matt Cox and ultimately produce Puffs as a commercial production at the off-Broadway Elektra Theater. The costumes were designed by Madeleine Bundy, the set and props were designed by Bundy and Liz Blessing, lighting was designed by Michelle Kelleher, sound was designed by Cox himself, and the production included original music by Brian (Hoes) Metolius.The cast remained the same except for Maltby, who was replaced by James Fouhey. The production also gained two swings, Jake Keefe and Anna Dart.

In May 2017, the building which the Elektra was in was condemned and the production was given three months to find a new home. David Carpenter ultimately decided to transfer the production to the preeminent off-Broadway theatre complex New World Stages for an open-ended run on their Stage 5. The show transferred to the theater on July 17, 2017, with the same cast, designs, and direction from the Elektra, with the exception of Blessing, leaving Bundy in charge of scenic, costume, and prop design. The production ran until August 18, 2019. Puffs broke every record at Stage 5 including, highest single day sales, highest advance, highest weekly sales and longest tenant in the theatre.

In late May 2018, Fathom Events announced that they would be broadcasting a live filming of Puffs live in theaters around the world for two nights. The recording was later uploaded to BroadwayHD, iTunes, Amazon and Google Play.

=== Subsequent productions ===
In April 2019, Puffs announced a new production at The Entertainment Quarter in Sydney, Australia. Lauren McKenna directed and also played Leanne. The Sydney show included re-worked designs by Bundy, Goldman, Cox, and Metolius. It opened on May 17 and included G-rated Saturday and Sunday matinees. It closed on June 30, 2019.

The Canadian premier of Puffs opened on June 7, 2019, at The Lower Ossington Theatre in Toronto, Canada, directed by Seanna Kennedy, stage-managed by Alyssa Obrigewitsch, and produced by Joseph Patrick. It featured set design by Michael Nicholas Galloro, costume design by Rachelle Bradley, and lighting design by Mikael Kangas. It closed on August 4, 2019.

A Mexican version is scheduled to open in 2022 in Saltillo, Mexico, by Cuarta Pared Teatro as the first version to be performed in Latin America.

== Synopsis ==
=== Act 1 ===
A Narrator addresses the audience and begins to tell a tale about a young, orphaned boy with a scar in the shape of a lightning bolt, but dismisses the boy's story to introduce another orphan named Wayne who lives with his uncle Dave in New Mexico. One day, an owl drops a letter in Wayne's living room telling him that he has been invited to "a certain school of magic." His uncle quickly tells him that his parents were wizards before rushing him to the train station. Wayne is then taken to the magic school and finds himself in a sorting ceremony in which students are sorted into different houses: "Braves," "Smarts," and "Snakes". Wayne tells another student how nervous he is and how he believes he could become a hero. The student is revealed to be the orphan boy from the beginning who is then sorted into the Braves house. The hat sorts Wayne in the "Puffs" category.

The Puffs introduce themselves in the Puffs common room. Megan declares that she was put into the Puffs house mistakenly and that she doesn't belong with the other Puffs. "Cedric" shows up and introduces himself as the group leader. He assures the group that they are a valid house, though they will be bullied. He encourages them to win third place in the Puffs' first House Cup by earning points for good behavior. Megan brags to Wayne and Oliver that her mother was known to have worked with the Dark Lord before sneaking out to be with the Snakes. Wayne and Oliver bond over both being new to the school and magic itself, and Oliver, a math prodigy, worries about the difficulty of magic. After a day of unsuccessful classes and many lost points, Wayne begins to lose hope. During the appearance of a troll in the dungeon during the school's Halloween feast, Wayne and Oliver notice that Megan is missing. They find her wandering around a forbidden chamber with her ghost friend, the Fat Friar. She complains about being alone. The Narrator introduces Megan's mom, Xavia Jones, who was put in WizPriz for working with the Dark Lord. Megan is hostile before agreeing to be friends with Wayne and Oliver. Before they leave, they all look into a mirror where they see their greatest desires. Wayne sees that he becomes a hero, Oliver becomes a famous mathematician, and Megan sees her mom and herself reuniting. Megan tells a teacher that Wayne and Oliver came to save her and the trio is awarded their first set of points. Sometime later, Cedric thanks Wayne for inspiring the Puffs to earn more points. At the end of the year, the headmaster announces that the Puffs came in third place and they celebrate, before the headmaster awards more points to the Braves so that the Puffs end up in fourth place again.

The Narrator introduces the second year, where a giant snake attacks the whole school. On Halloween, Wayne and Megan tell Oliver that a secret chamber has been opened and that the snake is inside. The defense teacher takes matters into his own hands and begins a dueling club. He selects "Blondo Malfoy" and Mr. Potter to practice dueling. After Malfoy casts a spell, it is revealed that Potter can talk to snakes. J Finch worries about dying, but leaves the room despite advice and is petrified when he sees the snake in the hallway. Wayne suggests that he kill the monster himself and become the hero of the school. He meets Ginny and develops a crush. Later, Harry kills the snake and everyone goes home for the summer.

In year three, Megan tells her friends that a masked murderer is in the school and that she thinks it's Xavia, coming to rescue her. She decides to spend time with the Braves to increase her chances. Leanne invites everyone to her slumber party and Sally, believing that Wayne and Oliver are throwing it, flirts with them. She takes off her glasses to get a clearer look at the invitation, and the boys quickly find her attractive. Cedric begins to tell the Puffs a bedtime story about how the magic school and the houses were founded, but before he gets to the Puffs, the headmaster calls for lights out. The trio remains awake and Megan reveals that she feels like a disappointment. On their field trip the next day the Puffs get drunk on Butterbeer.

In year four, the school holds a special three wizard tournament with two neighboring schools. Names are drawn from a cup to decide who will participate. Cedric's name is drawn but the Puffs' excitement is quickly halted when Potter's name is drawn as well. Wayne gives Cedric a book featuring different kinds of creatures he might have to face during the tournament. In the first challenge, the student must take the golden egg from a dragon's lair. Cedric uses one of Wayne's spells and comes in second place, just behind Potter. Cedric approaches Wayne with the prize from the challenge; Wayne helps him solve the egg's riddle. Wayne tells Cedric that he thinks the most while taking a bath. In the bathtub, Cedric encounters Myrtle and they figure out that the second challenge will be mermaids. Oliver and Megan go to a Christmas ball together where they awkwardly attempt to have fun. The Puffs attend the second challenge, which proves to be quite boring, but Cedric wins and they celebrate. When Wayne struggles with a spell, Cedric tells him that the best he can do is try. Cedric also promises to teach Wayne all the magic he knows after the third challenge. At the third challenge, the Puffs see Cedric emerge victorious, before realizing he is dead. The Narrator stops the show and gives the audience an intermission.

=== Act 2 ===
The Narrator begins the act where it left off. Cedric died during the final tournament challenge. In year five the Puffs are still mourning, but make a promise to not be "too sad." However, a drunk Wayne enters, yelling that there is no purpose in attending school without Cedric to guide them. Some of the Puffs have been inducted into Albus' Army. At the end of the year, Megan and Oliver kiss for the first time and reconcile their friendship with Wayne. It is announced that the Dark Lord has returned and that nobody is safe. In the Dark Lord's lair, he and Xavia are planning to steal Megan from the school and destroy Potter.

At the start of year six, Wayne is hoping to get a girlfriend and get onto the sports team. However, at the sports tryouts the rude coach, Zach Smith, declines all the Puffs. Sally attempts to flirt with Wayne and he agrees to go on a date with her. Megan follows directions from a note she thought was written by Oliver, but it turns out that Xavia wrote the note and took Megan hostage. Oliver and Wayne get caught as well, and Xavia tells Megan that she must kill Wayne and Oliver first before they can leave. Megan can't bring herself to kill them; Xavia calls her "nothing but a Puff" and a disgrace to the Dark Lord. Xavia begins to cast a death spell to kill all of them but gets the spell wrong several times. Megan realizes that her mother isn't as evil or capable as she seems. Xavia accidentally releases the trio and they fight her. She vows that they will regret this and vanishes. Megan realizes that deep down, both she and her mother are just Puffs but begins to accept who she truly is. They stop by the mirror they looked at in year one; their other wishes have vanished and their only wish is to remain friends forever.

During the summer, Oliver tells his friends that, for his safety as a "Mug Born," he will not be returning to the magic school for their final year. Wayne and Megan find it very hard to get on without him. When Potter returns to fight the Dark Lord and the Puffs all rush to him. Mr. Voldy tells everyone to bring him Harry or that there will be consequences over the school's loudspeaker. Potter runs off and the Puffs debate what to do. They come to the consensus that they can't fix anything because they are "just Puffs" so decide to go home. Leanne steps up to tell the group that they still matter at the school; everyone agrees to fight with Potter. Oliver shows up to help his friends. Xavia also sneaks in, now prepared to kill Megan. She accidentally kills one of Voldy's fighters and immediately feels guilty for it. She accepts that she is just a Puff and gives Megan her wand. Sally, J Finch, and Leanne are killed during the battle and the trio goes to help them. Voldy, thinking Wayne is Harry, kills him. Wayne awakens in a white train station with the headmaster, who died in the end of year six. Wayne realizes that he died in the battle and complains to the headmaster that his life was useless. The headmaster counters that Wayne was the hero in his own story. Wayne finally accepts his fate and the Narrator closes out the story, informing the audience that Harry killed Voldy and was once again hailed as the hero of the school. But before he lets the audience leave, he takes them to one final destination, nineteen years after the battle.

A now grown-up Megan walks through a train station where she meets with her husband, Oliver. They panic before they find their son wandering around. The boy is revealed to be the Narrator, now twelve years old and named Wayne. His parents tell him that while the school may be scary and dangerous, he is named after one of the bravest students ever, and they send him off on the train. Oliver asks Megan what house she thinks he'll be placed in and she tells him, "I have a pretty good idea." Wayne is seen in the sorting ceremony where a hat is placed on his head. After hearing what house he's been placed in, he looks out to the audience and smiles.

== Casts and characters ==
Character	Off-Off Broadway 2015	Off-Broadway 2017	Sydney 2019	Toronto 2019
Wayne Hopkins	Zac Moon	Zac Moon	Ryan Hawke	Mark Willett
Oliver Rivers	Langston Belton	Langston Belton	Adam Marks	Scott Labonte
Megan Jones	Julie Ann Earls	Julie Ann Earls	Angelina Thompson	Rae Bernakevitch
Narrator (Wayne Rivers-Jones)	A.J. Ditty	A.J. Ditty	Gareth Issac	Alice Cavanagh
Cedric/Mr. Voldy	Evan Maltby	James Fouhey	James Bryers	Joey Graff
Susie Bones/Harry/Others	Madeleine Bundy	Madeleine Bundy	Olivia Charalambous	Sydney Addison Rudat
J Finch Fletchly/Others	Nick Carrillo	Nick Carrillo	Daniel Cosgrove	Robert Popoli
Sally Perks/Others	Jessie Cannizzaro	Jessie Cannizzaro	Kimie Tsukakoshi	Lizzie Moffatt
Ernie Mac/Others	Stephen Stout	Stephen Stout	Matt Whitty	John Carr Cook
Hannah/Others	Eleanor Philips	Eleanor Philips	Annabelle Tudor	Morganna Marie
Leanne/Others	Andy Miller	Andy Miller	Lauren McKenna	Brynn Bonne

=== Lead characters ===
- Wayne Hopkins; a nerdy orphan wizard boy from New Mexico.
- Oliver Rivers; a mathematician wizard from New Jersey.
- Megan Jones; daughter of the infamous Xavia Jones who thinks she should be in the Snakes house.
- Narrator; The one with all the heavy books.
- Cedric; the lead Puff at the magic school.
- Mr. Voldy; an evil and dark lord who wants to take over the school and kill Harry.
- Mr. Potter; a famous student in the Brave house who kills magical beasts and constantly steals opportunities from the Puffs.
- Susie Bones; a Puff who lives in fear of death, because her entire family died.
- J Finch Fletchley; a flamboyant and happy Puff.
- Sally Perks; She goes to school here and is completely blind throughout half the show
- Ernie Mac; a very confident and self-obsessed Puff.
- Hannah; a shy Puff who gets made fun of by the other houses and does not realize what is happening.
- Leanne; a Puff who grew up as an only child, has never seen other children until now and wants to be friends with everybody.

=== Other characters ===
- A Very Tall Man
- Seamus Finnagan
- A Certain Potions Teacher
- Professor Turban
- Ghost History Teach
- Professor Locky
- Mr. Nick
- Sal
- 2nd Headmaster
- Real Mr. Moody
- 1st Headmaster
- Professor McG
- Professor Sproutty
- Xavia Jones
- Professor Lanny
- Runes Teach
- Ms. Babble
- Uncle Dave
- Goyle
- A Fat Friar
- Clumsy Longbottom
- Hermione #3
- Viktor
- Mr. Bagman
- Zach Smith
- Anthony Goldstein
- Ginny
- Helga
- Frenchy
- Hermione #1
- Blondo Malfoy
- Rowena
- Rita Scooter
- Dragon
- Bippy
- Colin
- Harry
- Hermione #2
- Ric Gryff
- Myrtle

== Critical reception ==
The New York Times's Laura Collins-Hughes wrote: "The fun of Puffs, though, is in its intersections with the story we know from J. K. Rowling's books and the movie adaptations. The one Puff with any panache is Cedric Diggory, played by Evan Maltby with such lovable good-guy warmth that when he dies, in an episode the narrator (A. J. Ditty) calls "Year Four: The Puffs and the Year They Mattered", it's actually rather sad. (Again: You didn't already know that Cedric dies? Not the show for you.)"

Diane Snyder from Time Out says: "But even Potter virgins will enjoy the show's witty wordplay and well-executed physical comedy. At times, the pacing is so frenetic that jokes can't find a place to land, but there's heart as well as humor here."

Theasy.com wrote: "Puffs wisely avoids special effects or high-tech gadgetry—the show begins with an overhead projector!—and instead uses inventive movement and plenty of (theatrical) magic."

Jade Kops of BroadwayWorld said: "Cox cleverly highlights the flaws in the books and the movies and neatly skirts around the Potter/Gryffindor centric storyline that everyone knows by not even presenting Ron and Hermione as real people. Professors are presented with enough recognizable traits to not require names to be used and events easily tie together for well versed fans."

Matt Windman from the theater critic's site AM New York wrote: "By the end, Puffs comes to resemble a Saturday Night Live skit that has gone on way too long, feeling rushed in its storytelling and long-winded in its execution. Many jokes fail to land, and the humor may be too tame for its own good... Nevertheless, Puffs offers a good deal of harmless fun and manages to embrace a cute riff on a popular franchise."

== Awards and nominations ==
=== Off-Broadway production ===
Year	Award	Category	Nominee	Result
2017	Off Broadway Alliance Award	Best Unique Theatrical Experience		Nominated
