= Yokohama Theatre Group =

Theatre group in Japan

The Yokohama Theatre Group
- YTG Logo since early 2007
- Formation: September 6, 1900
- Type: Theatre group
- Purpose: English-language theatre in a Japanese context
- Location: Japan
- Website: http://yokohama-theatre.com

The Yokohama Theatre Group is an English-language theatre group operating out of Yokohama in Kanagawa Prefecture, Japan.

Founded in 1900 as the Amateur Dramatics Club (later the Yokohama Amateur Dramatics Club) and renamed in 1983 to the Yokohama Theatre Group, the group survived two World Wars and a major earthquake, and has continued producing Theatre to the present day.

== History ==
Originally named the Amateur Dramatic Club, the group held its first official meeting on Thursday, September 6, 1900, and produced its first show (The Schoolmistress by Arthur Wing Pinero) on November 12 of the same year. The word Yokohama was eventually prefixed to name of the group, and from 1916 on was used in most of the group's internal paperwork. In late 1982, the Committee (the Board of Directors) began using the name "The Yokohama Theatre Group" in reference to the group, and at the 1983 Annual General Meeting the new name was officially voted in.

From 1900 to 1923, nearly all the Yokohama-based performances of the group took place in the Public Hall, later renamed the Bluff Gaiety Theatre, a building which was partially owned by the club but was unfortunately destroyed during the Great Kantō earthquake of 1923. Since that time, the group has had no permanent home, and has performed its shows on stages in hotels, local schools and colleges, and, especially since 1981, the Yokohama Country and Athletic Club.

The group's activities picked up again after the earthquake and continued until October 1940 when the production of Where Do We Go From Here? became the last show before the hostilities of World War II made further shows impossible. In December of that year, Nils Kallin, a Swede, was elected as chairman because it was thought that having a national of a neutral country in charge would better safeguard the group's finances until the war's end.

After the end of the Pacific War, it took nearly seven years (until 1952) for shows to start being produced again. The first post-war production was Blithe Spirit.

== Productions ==
The original (Yokohama) Amateur Dramatics Group was known for producing popular "crowd pleasing" plays of the time, mainly farces, comic operas, and other light, comedic entertainment. In the post-war period, the tendency to light entertainment remained (including the tradition of an annual pantomime or family musical around the Christmas season starting in 1971), although the occasional dramatic or more difficult comedy (e.g. Lysistrata, After the Fall) was produced. In addition, YTG had a strong tradition of music revues, play readings, recitals and other non-Theatrical entertainments.

From 2008 to 2010, the company placed a greater emphasis on co-productions and tours, including YTG's first co-production in 108 years with its counterpart group in Tokyo (The Tokyo International Players).

In the summer of 2010, the group toured a one-man show to Canada; its first international tour.

Since 2011, the group has changed to an ensemble-based production style, and has started running regular classes.

== Membership ==
The group was structured very much like a club in its early years and had very formal rules and regulations regarding membership. Full membership was limited to men only until at least 1923, and members had to be nominated and seconded in a very formal manner. There was also a fee involved for much of the group's history, although current membership is obtained on a year-to-year basis by doing volunteer work for the group.

The membership was initially very British, and it wasn't until after the Second World War and the American occupation of Japan that American members became predominant.
