= The Game's Afoot =

2012 book by Ken Ludwig

- Author: Ken Ludwig
- Genre: Play (theatre), Drama
- Published: 2012
- Publisher: Samuel French, Inc.
- Pages: 108
- Awards: Edgar Award for Best Play (2012)
- ISBN: 978-0-573-70046-0
- Website: The Game's Afoot

The Game's Afoot (ISBN 978-0-573-70046-0; The Game's Afoot; or Holmes for the Holidays) is a play written by Ken Ludwig and published by Samuel French, Inc. on November 14, 2012, and which later won the Edgar Award for Best Play in 2012.
