= J. Scott Burgeson =

American author (born 1967)

- Born: 1967 (age 58–59); Lincoln, Nebraska, US
- Education: University of California, Berkeley
- Occupation: Teacher
- Writing career
- Pen name: King Baeksu; Scott Bug
- Language: Korean; English
- Notable work: Korea Bug: The Best of the Zine that Infected a Nation
- Website: kingbaeksu.com kingbaeksu.substack.com

J. Scott Burgeson (Korean: J. 스콧 버거슨; born 1967) is an American author, teacher and a specialist in East Asian art based in Seoul, South Korea. He has written four books in South Korea.

== Biography ==
J. Scott Burgeson was born on 1967 at Lincoln, Nebraska. He grew up at the San Francisco Bay Area and he graduated with honors from the University of California, Berkeley in 1991 in English and Rhetoric. At the U.C. Berkeley he was editor-in-chief of the campus literary journal Byzantium.

After the university he became critic for the San Francisco Bay Guardian, San Francisco Review of Books, the East Bay Express and The Daily Californian from 1990 to 1994 before relocating to Osaka, Japan, in 1994, and he wrote for Giant Robot, Kyoto Journal, Tokyo Journal, Kansai Time Out and PLAYBOY JAPAN. Before that he moved to Seoul, South Korea in 1996, his writing has appeared in The Brooklyn Rail, Newsweek Korea, The Korea Times, Korean Quarterly, The Korea Herald, Les Cahiers de Corée, The New York Times and Cine21. He was also a regular columnist for Maxim Korea and Chosun Ilbo. He published the zine Korea Bug between 1997 and 2001 about Korean culture and society.

He has dedicated himself to working at universities it Korean studies like in the Hongik University.

He is considered critical of the multiculturalism that has occurred in the United States and South Korea, and has tried to foster good ties of friendship between Westerners and nationals in South Korea.

== Works ==
- Maximum Korea (맥시멈코리아, 1999) ISBN 8976763041, 9788976763044
- Nasty Korean Studies (발칙한 한국학, 2002)
- Korea Bug: The Best of the Zine that Infected a Nation (2005) ISBN 8956601097
- Korea Consumer Report (대한민국 사용후기, 2005)
- Outlanders (2008)
- More Nasty Korean Studies (더 발칙한 한국학, 2009)
- Waygooks: Stories From Korea (2010)
