= Kansai Time Out =

English language news magazine published in Kobe, Japan

Kansai Time Out (関西タイムアウト) was an English language monthly news magazine published in Kobe, Japan, between 1977 and 2009.

== History and profile ==
Kansai Time Out was first published in February 1977. The founders were David Jack (who died on 17 September 2021) and his wife, Sachiko Matsunaga. Matsunaga was also the publisher. It was published on a monthly basis. The headquarters of the monthly was in Kobe.

The magazine was staffed by many throughout the years, and was a focal point for Kansai society, featuring local activities and events, interviews with both local and international people, and varied articles about social, political and cultural events. The magazine also published several lists. It folded in 2009 after being sold to a bigger publishing group that appeared to use it as a tax loss, shutting it down almost immediately after acquiring it. The last issue to be published was #391 in September 2009.

== Notable contributors ==
- Doreen Simmons contributed features on sumo
- J. Scott Burgeson.
