= Joe Sears =

American actor, playwright, and director

- Sears as Pearl Burras in Tuna Does Vegas
- Born: August 23, 1949 (age 77); Bartlesville, Oklahoma, U.S.
- Education: Northeastern State University
- Occupations: Actor; playwright; director

Joe Sears (born August 23, 1949) is an American actor, playwright, and director. He is best known as a co-creator and performer in the Greater Tuna series of plays, in which he and Jaston Williams portrayed the residents of the fictional small town of Tuna, Texas. His performance in the Broadway production of A Tuna Christmas earned him a 1995 Tony Award nomination for Best Actor in a Play.

== Early life and education ==
Sears was born in Bartlesville, Oklahoma, and grew up in a ranching family in the Osage Hills. He attended Northeastern State College, now Northeastern State University, and earned degrees in teaching art and drama. While a junior, he was named the college's best actor for the second consecutive year for his performance as Falstaff in The Merry Wives of Windsor.

== Career ==
=== Early theatre work and Greater Tuna ===
His first professional theatre job was working on the Cherokee Nation's outdoor drama Trail of Tears near Tahlequah. The play portrayed the removal of the Cherokee from the southeastern United States to eastern Oklahoma. In 1973, he joined the First Repertory Company of San Antonio and made his debut as one of the rude mechanicals in A Midsummer Night's Dream, where he met Jaston Williams, who played Puck.

Several years later, they moved to Austin to work with another theatre company. After that company ran out of money, Williams was asked to provide entertainment for a party, and he and Sears created a sketch about a fictional small Texas town. The audience reaction convinced them to keep developing the idea. Director Ed Howard raised the money to stage the resulting Greater Tuna in Austin in 1981.

Sears based characters including Bertha Bumiller and Aunt Pearl on women he knew growing up in Oklahoma. Greater Tuna also satirized the political and religious climate surrounding the Moral Majority and Jerry Falwell. Sears and Williams played the town's residents themselves, changing voice, posture, costume, age, and gender as they moved from one character to another.

Greater Tuna later moved Off-Broadway to Circle in the Square. Sears, Williams, and Howard followed it with A Tuna Christmas and Red, White and Tuna. A Tuna Christmas reached Broadway in December 1994, with Sears portraying multiple characters. In 2008, Sears, Williams, and Howard returned to the series with Tuna Does Vegas, the fourth play.

=== Acting, writing, and directing beyond Tuna ===
In Washington, D.C., Sears and Williams played the two fathers in The Fantasticks at Ford's Theatre. They also doubled in comic supporting roles. The following year, Sears played Betty Meeks in Larry Shue's The Foreigner at Washington's Warner Theatre.

Sears rewrote the Trail of Tears pageant in 1997. When it was revived in 2001, he revised the script again and brought back dance sequences removed from his earlier version. For Ochelata's Wedding, an opera commissioned by the OK Mozart International Music Festival, he and Williams wrote the libretto in 2000.

He also worked with Austin singer-songwriter Kimmie Rhodes on theatre projects, including Small Town Girl and Hillbilly Heaven. In Windblown, which premiered at Conroe's Crighton Theatre in January 2005, Sears narrated the story and portrayed several characters from the Texas–Mexico border region. The production combined Rhodes's live music with interpretive dance. Rhodes and Sears wrote and starred in Small Town Girl, which premiered at Conroe's Crighton Theatre in 2006. Sears directed the production.

=== Visual art ===
Sears made visual art throughout his theatre career. At Rendon Photography & Fine Art, his exhibition Everything in Life displayed more than 30 years of work. It included landscapes, watercolors, black-velvet paintings, ceramics, and decorated birdhouses. Sears also worked in sculpture and became an artist-in-residence at Northeastern State University.

=== Return to Oklahoma ===
In 2012, Sears and Williams retired from regularly performing the Tuna roles and turned the characters over to other actors. After 38 years in Austin, Sears returned to Bartlesville, where he continued working as a writer and director in the Oklahoma community theatre with younger performers.

In 2013, Sears became artistic director of Theater Bartlesville and directed Little Shop of Horrors. He also directed If All the Sky Were Paper, a drama drawn from soldiers' letters, during the company's 2014–15 season.

He performed with Tulsa's Spotlight Theatre and its long-running production of The Drunkard, which he had first seen there as a teenager. By 2020, he was the production's director. As a guest for the Comedy Parlor's T-Town Famous Improv Show, his stories provided prompts for improvisational comedy.

Sears and Williams wrote the book for The Nerve of Minerva, a musical satire featuring barnyard animals, with music by Allen Robertson and lyrics by Williams and Robertson. After development workshops at Austin's ZACH Theatre and Texas Tech University, the musical received its world premiere at Texas Tech in April 2025, directed by Jesse Jou.

== Awards and honors ==
Sears received a Tony Award nomination for Best Actor in a Play for A Tuna Christmas. He received the Distinguished Artist Award from the Tulsa Awards for Theatre Excellence. In 2024, he received a Circle Cinema Walk of Fame medallion in Tulsa, which recognized his career as both an actor and playwright.
