= The Gods of Comedy =

Play by American playwright Ken Ludwig

The Gods of Comedy is a play by American playwright Ken Ludwig. It was first produced as a co-production between McCarter Theatre (Emily Mann (director), Artistic Director; Michael S. Rosenberg, Managing Director) and Old Globe Theatre (Barry Edelstein, Artistic Director). It was directed by Amanda Dehnert, with Scenic Design by Jason Sherwood, Costume Design by Linda Roethke, Wig and Makeup Design by Carissa Thorlakson, Lighting Design by Brian Gale, Sound Design by Darron L West, Illusion Design by Jim Steinmeyer and Choreography by Ellenore Scott. It opened at McCarter Theatre on March 16, 2019 and at Old Globe Theatre on May 16, 2019.

The comedic play features the Greek god Dionysus, Thalia (Muse), and a pair of modern-day classics professors named Ralph and Daphne. Ralph has just discovered the find of the century - a manuscript of the lost tragedy Andromeda (play) by Euripides. But when Daphne accidentally misplaces the manuscript, she calls on the gods to help her retrieve it - and to her surprise, they actually appear. Dionysus and Thalia (Muse) arrive determined to help Daphne, at which point comedic mayhem ensues.

== McCarter Theatre production ==
The production opened at McCarter Theatre Center in Princeton, New Jersey on March 16, 2019 and ran through March 31, 2019. The Gods of Comedy was Ken Ludwig's fourth production at McCarter Theatre Center in four years, after 2015's Baskerville: A Sherlock Holmes Mystery, 2015's A Comedy of Tenor's, and 2017's Murder on the Orient Express.

=== Cast ===
- Brad Oscar as Dionysus
- Jessie Cannizzaro as Thalia (Muse)
- Shay Vawn as Daphne
- Jevon McFerrin as Ralph
- Keira Naughton as Dean Trickett
- Steffanie Leigh as Zoe/Brooklyn
- George Psomas as Aristide/Aleksi/Ares

== Old Globe Theatre production ==
The play, again directed by Amanda Dehnert, opened at Old Globe Theatre in San Diego, California on May 11, 2019 and ran through June 16, 2019. The production was Ken Ludwig's third world premiere at Old Globe Theatre in four years, after 2015's Baskerville: A Sherlock Holmes Mystery and 2017's "Ken Ludwig's Robin Hood."

=== Cast ===
- Brad Oscar as Dionysus
- Jessie Cannizzaro as Thalia (Muse)
- Shay Vawn as Daphne
- Jevon McFerrin as Ralph
- Keira Naughton as Dean Trickett
- Stephanie Leigh as Zoe/Brooklyn
- George Psomas as Aristide/Aleksi/Ares

== Critical reception ==
James Hebert from The San Diego Union-Tribune wrote: "...the show's crowd-pleasing vibe feels all about the broad humor, madcap antics and gentle innuendo of Golden Age TV and film comedy (with, it should be said, a little Shakespearean magic thrown into the mix). [...] The show boasts plenty of winning physical comedy and some of the same inventive stage business and mistaken-identity fun that drove Ludwig's Broadway hit “Lend Me a Tenor” and other works. Director Amanda Dehnert and her capable cast also keep the energy sustained even through some patches of groaner jokes, with the ever-kinetic Cannizzaro and Oscar leading the way."

Matthew Michaels from BroadwayWorld wrote: "Esteemed playwright Ken Ludwig, winner of multiple Tony and Olivier Awards, introduced his newest piece at The McCarter Theater Center in Princeton, New Jersey. Ken Ludwig's THE GODS OF COMEDY opened to rapturous laughter and a receptive audience thanks to a bright production and terrific performances. [...] Dionysus, the Greek God of Wine and Revelry and inspiration behind the earliest Greek theater, is played marvelously by Broadway veteran Brad Oscar. Thalia, the Muse of Comedy, matches the brilliance of Dionysus with a vivid and playful performance by Jessie Cannizzaro."

Donald H. Sanborn III from Town Topics wrote: "McCarter Theatre is presenting the world premiere of The Gods of Comedy. In this delightful farce by Ken Ludwig, a classics professor makes a mistake that threatens her career, as well as her romantic interest in a colleague. [...] Brad Oscar and Jessie Cannizzaro form an outstanding comic duo. The exuberant, feisty lust for life that Oscar brings to Dionysus, paired with the impish charm with which Cannizzaro infuses Thalia, keeps the audience eager to follow their antics."
