= Be My Baby (web series) =

2019 Thai web series

- Thai: Be My Baby – คนนี้เด็กผม
- Genre: Comedy; Children
- Country of origin: Thailand
- Original language: Thai
- No. of episodes: 8

Production
- Production company: GMMTV

Original release
- Network: YouTube; Facebook Watch
- Release: 26 November 2019 – 31 March 2020

Be My Baby (known in its original Thai language as Be My Baby – คนนี้เด็กผม; lit. Be My Baby - This Kid Me) is a Thai web series of GMMTV currently available for streaming on YouTube and Facebook Watch.

Each episode features two GMMTV artists as they compete with each other in winning over the child to their side through various challenges. The series premiered on 26 November 2019 and aired every 1st, 3rd, and 5th Tuesday of the month. It aired its last episode on 31 March 2020.

== Episodes ==
No.	Guests	Original release date	Ref.
1	Atthaphan Phunsawat (Gun); Nawat Phumphotingam (White)	26 November 2019	
2	Purim Rattanaruangwattana (Pluem); Harit Cheewagaroon (Sing)	25 December 2019	
3	Kanaphan Puitrakul (First); Tawan Vihokratana (Tay)	21 January 2020	
4	Kittipat Chalaruk (Golf); Watchara Sukchum (Jennie)	4 February 2020	
5	Tawan Vihokratana (Tay); Korapat Kirdpan (Nanon)	18 February 2020	
6	Watchara Sukchum (Jennie); Nawat Phumphotingam (White)	3 March 2020	
7	Worranit Thawornwong (Mook); Pathompong Reonchaidee (Toy)	17 March 2020	
8	Perawat Sangpotirat (Krist); Kay Lertsittichai	31 March 2020	
