= She's My Baby =

She's My Baby may refer to:

== Songs ==
- "She's My Baby" (Traveling Wilburys song), 1990
- "She's My Baby" (Wings song), 1976
- "She's My Baby", a song by Faithless from Sunday 8PM
- "She's My Baby", a song by Fats Domino
- "She's My Baby", a song by Johnny O'Keefe
- "She's My Baby", a song by Mazzy Star from So Tonight That I Might See
- "She's My Baby", a song by the Rocket Summer from Calendar Days
- "She's My Baby (And She's Outta Control)", a song from the soundtrack to Fast Times at Ridgemont High

== Other ==
- She's My Baby (film), a 1927 American silent comedy film
- She's My Baby, a 1928 musical by Rodgers and Hart
