= There Goes My Baby =

There Goes My Baby may refer to:

- "There Goes My Baby" (The Drifters song), 1959
- "There Goes My Baby" (Enrique Iglesias song), 2014
- "There Goes My Baby" (Charlie Wilson song), 2008
- "There Goes My Baby" (Trisha Yearwood song), 1998
- "There Goes My Baby" (Usher song), 2010
- "There Goes My Baby", a 2024 song by D4vd
- There Goes My Baby (film) or The Last Days of Paradise, a 1994 film starring Dermot Mulroney
