= Kyoto Journal =

Quarterly magazine based in Kyoto, Japan

- Kyoto Journal 75, Fall 2010
- Editor: John Einarsen, Ken Rodgers, Susan Pavlovska, Dreux Richard
- Categories: Environment, arts, literary, politics
- Frequency: Quarterly
- Founded: 1986
- Country: Japan
- Based in: Kyoto
- Language: English
- Website: http://www.kyotojournal.org
- ISSN: 0913-5200

Kyoto Journal is a quarterly magazine based in Kyoto, Japan. Its subtitle, Perspectives from Asia, reflects its commitment to "local voices, from all over Asia" and "ideas that illuminate cultural differences in a positive way, that promote intercultural understanding via specifics, not generalities." In addition to its four main editors, the magazine is staffed by a team of interns and over 30 contributing editors spread throughout Asia. Its diverse readership and list of contributors has been described by former editor Stewart Wachs as a "psychographic" community. Since its founding, the magazine has been entirely produced by volunteers.

== History ==
Kyoto Journal was founded in 1986 by editor and designer John Einarsen, whose editorial vision was heavily influenced by publications like CoEvolution Quarterly, which blended arts, spirituality, and Asian cultures.

The magazine was awarded the Utne Reader's prestigious Independent Press Award for Excellence in Art & Design in 1998, and it has been regularly shortlisted for General Excellence, Local/Regional Coverage, Writing Excellence, and Best Essays.

Until 2011, it was published by Harada Shokei of Heian Bunka Center, a Japanese calligraphy school in Kyoto. After the publication of 75 full print issues, the magazine announced in December 2010 that it would switch to digital editions beginning with issue 76.

== Contributors ==
Contributors to Kyoto Journal have included Gary Snyder, Pico Iyer, Nobuyoshi Araki, Royall Tyler, Donald Richie, Barry Lopez, Arne Naess, Kōbō Abe, J. Scott Burgeson, Peter Matthiessen, Arundhati Roy, Noam Chomsky, and Linda Connor. Author Suzanne Kamata is the current fiction editor.
