= Leading Ladies (play) =

Comedy play by Ken Ludwig

Leading Ladies is a comedy play by Ken Ludwig. It involves two Shakespearean actors who find themselves in the Amish country of York, Pennsylvania, mounting Shakespeare plays. The play, a co-production of the Alley Theatre (Houston) and The Cleveland Play House, premiered in 2004, directed by Ludwig.

== Synopsis ==
Set in York, Pennsylvania in 1958, this farce centers on two down-on-their-luck Shakespearean actors, Leo Clark and Jack Gable. The pair discover through a newspaper that Florence, an older ailing woman, has been unable to find Max and Steve, her sister's children who moved away to England as children in order to include them in her multimillion-dollar inheritance. They decide to pose as Max and Steve to claim portions of it. When they discover that "Max" and "Steve" are actually "Maxine" and "Stephanie," they continue on, undaunted, in drag. Leo falls for Florence's actual niece Meg, while Jack swoons over Florence's part-time aide Audrey. Florence recovers just as the pair arrives, but they decide to keep on, both to try to outlast her health and to stay close to the objects of their interest. Leo convinces Meg, who is enamored of Shakespeare and a fan of Jack and Leo, to put on a production at Florence's estate, to give himself more of an opportunity to be with her, both as Leo and Maxine. Meanwhile, Meg's fiancé Duncan grows increasingly suspicious of the "Leading Ladies."

On the night of the production, a telegram arrives at the house stating that the real Maxine and Stephanie will arrive that night. Leo's plan to use Jack-as-Stephanie to seduce Duncan in front of Meg and stop their marriage fails when Audrey accidentally gives the family doctor a "love note" meant for Duncan. The telegram ends up in the hands of Duncan, who gloats at the opportunity to get rid of the two impostors. Meg confesses to "Maxine" that she loves her, prompting him and Jack to consult each other while in costume as women, which Meg and Audrey accidentally eavesdrop on and discover the true identities of their "cousins". An angry Audrey confronts Jack, but when he breaks down and apologizes, she accepts his marriage proposal. The same occurs with Meg and Leo, but Meg tells Leo he needs to run, as the real cousins are due to arrive. However, the police arrest the "real cousins", identifying them as two notorious con artists. To Duncan's horror, Leo (still in character as Maxine) and Meg announce that they're getting married. After Florence scares everyone by seeming to have died for a minute, everyone suddenly remembers that they're supposed to be putting on a play and prepare to begin the show. (Some productions include a final scene in which a frantic and short version of Twelfth Night is performed by the cast.)

== Productions ==
The play premiered at The Alley Theatre in Houston, Texas in October 2004. Directed by Ludwig, the costumes were by Judith Dolan and sets by Neil Patel. The play played an engagement at the Cleveland Playhouse in September 2004.

The cast:

- Erin Dilly — Meg
- Brent Barrett — Leo/"Maxine"
- Christopher Duva — Jack/"Stephanie"
- Lacey Kohl — Audrey
- Mark Jacoby — Duncan
- Jane Connell — Florence
- Dan Lauria — Doc
- Tim McGeever — Butch

=== Other productions ===
Divadlo Na Fidlovačce, Prague

- Czech name: V korzetu pro tetu. Directed by Petr Rychlý. The play had premiere 10 September 2009.
- Megan McCormick .... Meg
- Marek Holý .... Leo
- Denny Ratajský .... Jack
- Zuzana Vejvodová .... Audrey
- Daniel Rous .... Duncan
- Lilian Malkina .... Florence
- Václav Svoboda .... Doctor

Kanata Theatre, Ottawa, ON

- Mark Linder .... Leo
- Andrew Williams .... Jack

The Gateway Theatre, Richmond, BC

- Luisa Jojic .... Meg
- Peter Jorgensen .... Leo
- Allan Zynik .... Jack
- Tara Davis .... Audrey
- Jenifer Darbellay .... Stephanie
- William Samples .... Doctor
- Chris Robson .... Reverend Wooley

Mariebergsskogen Karlstad, Sweden

- Joakim Nätterqvist .... Leo
- Göran Gillinger .... Jack
- Sara Sommerfeld .... Meg
