= A Tuna Christmas =

Play written by Joe Sears

- Original language: English
- Written by: Jaston Williams, Joe Sears, and Ed Howard
- Series: Greater Tuna, Red, White and Tuna, and Tuna Does Vegas
- Genre: Comedy
- Setting: Tuna, Texas

Premiere
- Date: 1989
- Official website

A Tuna Christmas is the second in a series of comedic plays (preceded by Greater Tuna and followed by Red, White and Tuna and Tuna Does Vegas), each set in the fictional town of Tuna, Texas, the "third-smallest" town in the state. The trilogy was written by Jaston Williams, Joe Sears, and Ed Howard. The plays are at once an affectionate comment on small-town, Southern life and attitudes but also a withering satire of same. The plays are notable in that two men play the entire cast of over twenty eccentric characters of multiple genders and various ages. The first play, Greater Tuna, debuted in 1981 in Austin; A Tuna Christmas debuted in 1989 with touring ending in 2012 after Sears' retirement from the troupe.

Williams and Sears regularly toured the country to perform all four plays, with Howard directing. Sears and Williams did command performances of both Greater Tuna and A Tuna Christmas at the White House for President George H. W. Bush and Barbara Bush.

A videotaped performance of A Tuna Christmas is available on VHS and DVD.

The play continues to be regularly performed across the country to positive reviews.

== Cast of characters ==
Performed by Williams:

- Arles Struvie - A disc jockey at radio station OKKK.
- Didi Snavely - Owner of Didi's Used Weapons ("If we can't kill it, it's immortal")
- Petey Fisk - Employee of the Greater Tuna Humane Society
- Jody Bumiller - Youngest child of Bertha Bumiller
- Stanley Bumiller - Aspiring taxidermist, fresh from reform school; twin to Charlene
- Charlene Bumiller - Daughter of Bertha Bumiller and sister to Stanley and Jody; infatuated with Joe Bob Lipsey. As seen with Bertha Bumiller (Sears) at the Kennedy Center]
- Vera Carp - Town snob and acting leader of the Smut-Snatchers of the New Order ("until the Rev. Spikes gets out of prison")
- Dixie Deberry - Controller of the Tuna Electric Company
- Helen Bedd - A waitress at the Tasty-Creme As seen with Inita Goodwin (Sears) at the Kennedy Center]
- Farley Burkhalter - A "little person" and a patron of the Tasty-Creme
- Garland Poteet- A soda distributor and one of Inita's many boyfriends

Performed by Sears:

- Thurston Wheelis - A disc jockey at radio station OKKK
- Elmer Watkins - The victim of a tragic flameshooter incident, Elmer was left with no eyebrows.
- Bertha Bumiller - Housewife and mother to Jody, Stanley, and Charlene; member of the Smut Snatchers of the New Order ("Censorship is as American as apple pie, so shut up!")
- Leonard Childers - Entrepreneur and radio personality on OKKK
- R.R. Snavely - UFOlogist and husband to Didi
- Pearl Burras - Aunt to Bertha, former riveter in Houston during World War II (the Japanese "never sank one of [her] ships!")
- Sheriff Givens - Called "Rubber Sheets" due to his having wet the bed at church camp
- Ike Thompson- a slow-witted highway worker
- Inita Goodwin - A waitress at the Tasty-Creme
- Phoebe Burkhalter- Presumably Farley's significant other, Phoebe is voiced by Sears but onstage is a wig behind a window manipulated by a stagehand
- Joe Bob Lipsey - the "not-the-marrying-kind" director of the Tuna Little Theater's "troubled production" of A Christmas Carol

== Plot ==
The plot of A Tuna Christmas centers on the town's annual Christmas Yard Display Contest, won 14 times in a row by Vera Carp. A mysterious "Christmas Phantom", known for vandalizing the yard displays, threatens to throw the contest into turmoil. Among the subplots are Stanley Bumiller's attempts to end his probation and leave Tuna, Bertha Bumiller's trying to hold her family together at Christmas time, and Joe Bob Lipsey's struggle to mount successfully his production of A Christmas Carol despite numerous vexations and obstacles.

== Honors for A Tuna Christmas ==
- Nominee, Outstanding Non-Resident Production, Helen Hayes Awards Non-Resident Production, 1990

Joe Sears:

- Nominee, Outstanding Lead Actor in a Touring Production, Helen Hayes Awards Non-Resident Acting, 1990, 1998
- Best Actor, Los Angeles Dramalogue Award, 1993.
- Nominee, Tony Award for Best Performance by a Leading Actor in a Play, 1995.

Jaston Williams:

- Nominee, Outstanding Lead Actor in a Non-Resident Production, Helen Hayes Awards Non-Resident Acting, 1990, 1998
- L.A. Dramalogue Award
