= Be My Baby (Ken Ludwig play) =

Play written by Ken Ludwig

Be My Baby is a play by American playwright Ken Ludwig. It premiered at the Alley Theatre in Houston, Texas in October 2005 and starred Hal Holbrook and Dixie Carter, directed by John Rando.

The play tells the story of an irascible Scotsman, John, and an uptight English woman, Maude, both in their late 50s, who are unexpectedly thrown together on the journey of a lifetime.
