= Greater Tuna =

1981 American play

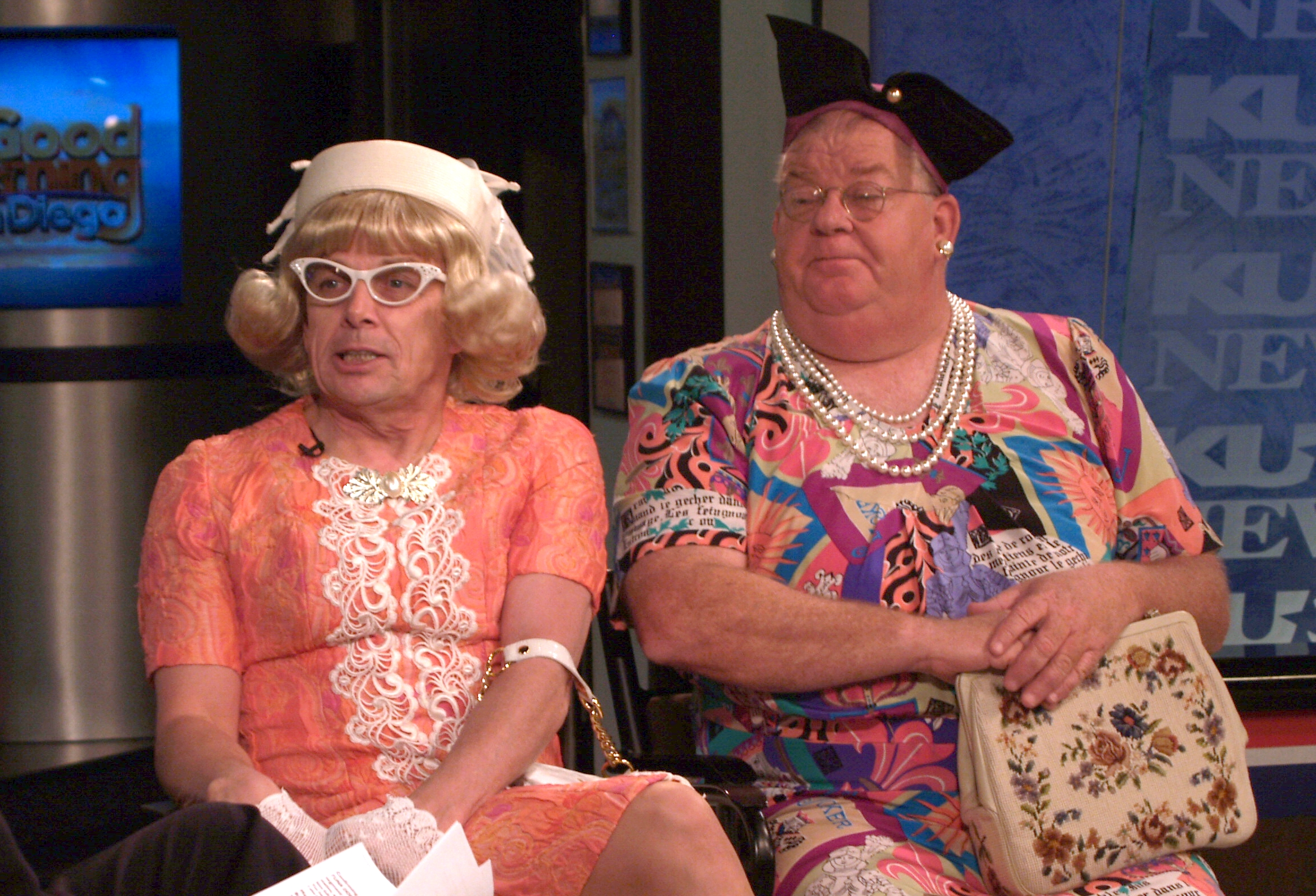
- Jaston Williams and Joe Sears as Vera Carp & Pearl Burras, 2009
- Original language: English
- Written by: Jaston Williams, Joe Sears, and Ed Howard
- Series: A Tuna Christmas, Red, White and Tuna, and Tuna Does Vegas
- Genre: comedy
- Setting: Tuna, Texas

Premiere
- Date: 1981
- Official website

Greater Tuna is the first in a series of four comedic plays, followed by A Tuna Christmas, Red, White and Tuna, and Tuna Does Vegas. Each play is set in the fictional town of Tuna, Texas, the "third-smallest" town in the state. The series was written by Jaston Williams, Joe Sears, and Ed Howard. The plays are an affectionate comment on small-town Southern life and attitudes, while also satirizing them. Of the four plays, Greater Tuna is the darkest in tone, as it follows the news of the death, and possible murder, of Judge Buckner.

The plays are notable for using two actors to portray the entire cast of more than twenty eccentric characters of different genders and ages. Greater Tuna premiered in Austin, Texas, in 1981 and had its off-Broadway premiere in 1982.

== History ==
Greater Tuna originated in Austin, where Williams, Sears, and Howard were involved in the city's small-stage theater scene. The play premiered in 1981 at the TransAct Theatre on East Sixth Street.

The material developed after Sears and Williams performed a short comic skit at a party, inspired by a Ben Sargent cartoon about authoritarianism, and added improvised commercials for characters who later evolved into Bertha Bumiller and Petey Fisk. The characters were developed into a series of sketches before becoming a full-length play.

Williams later said the audience response convinced them that the material could be expanded. He recalled that he and Sears then spent months swimming at Barton Springs before breakfast brainstorming sessions, while Howard withdrew his savings to help finance the production. The collaborators shaped the play as a series of political cartoons satirizing the early Reagan era and the rise of the Moral Majority, with most of the material developed jointly by the three men.

After its Austin premiere, Greater Tuna built an audience through word of mouth and an extended local run. A history published by Austin's Paramount Theatre describes a 1982 staging of Greater Tuna as the venue's biggest stage success, saying that it outsold all non-sporting entertainment in the city and helped lead to sequels and a devoted local following. Williams later said that beginning in Austin was important to the play's success because local audiences were receptive to new work. The production subsequently moved to other cities, including San Antonio, Atlanta, Hartford, Houston, New York, and San Francisco, where it ran for seven years.

Charles H. Duggan produced national tours of Greater Tuna, A Tuna Christmas, and Red, White and Tuna for twenty-six years. Williams and Sears regularly toured the country to perform all four plays, with Howard directing. Regional productions included a 2000 staging by St. Vincent Summer Theatre and a 2002 production by No Name Players.

An HBO special of Greater Tuna, produced by Embassy Television and Norman Lear, aired in 1984. Because of copyright conflicts between Embassy Television and the original copyright claimants, Sears, Williams, and Howard, the broadcast was limited to three months in 1984 and has not been rebroadcast. Sears and Williams also performed both Greater Tuna and A Tuna Christmas at the White House for President George H. W. Bush and Barbara Bush.

According to the play's official website, by 1985, Greater Tuna was the most-produced play in the United States. A videotaped performance of Greater Tuna, separate from the Lear HBO production, is available on VHS and DVD.

== Partial cast of characters ==
Performed by Williams

- Charlene Bumiller - Daughter of Hank and Bertha Bumiller, and sister to Stanley and Jody
- Jody Bumiller - Youngest child of Bertha Bumiller, followed constantly by "eight to ten dogs"
- Stanley Bumiller - fresh from reform school; twin to Charlene
- Vera Carp - Town snob and vice president of the Smut-Snatchers of the New Order
- Petey Fisk - Employee of the Greater Tuna Humane Society
- Didi Snavely - Owner of Didi's Used Weapons ("If we can't kill it, it's immortal")
- Arles Struvie - A disc jockey at radio station OKKK
- Chad Hartford- A reporter from Houston who comes to interview Bertha
- Phinas Blye- A politician from Indiana who runs for City Council every election
- Harold Dean Lattimer- OKKK's weatherman

Performed by Sears

- Bertha Bumiller - wife of Hank and mother to Jody, Stanley, and Charlene; member of the Smut Snatchers of the New Order
- Hank Bumiller- Husband of Bertha
- Pearl Burras - Aunt to Bertha, who is, as Petey Fisk claims, addicted to killing dogs (in the play, called canicidal thumbitus)
- Leonard Childers - Station Manager of OKKK for his talk show, "Leonard on the Line"
- Sheriff Givens- Believes in old-fashioned jails
- Elmer Watkins, head of the local chapter of the KKK, dedicated to making the town safe "for the right kind of people"
- Yippy the dog- Pet of the month for five weeks in a row, yips a lot, and no one wants to adopt him
- R.R. Snavely - UFOlogist, town drunk, and husband to Didi
- The Reverend Spikes, president of the Smut Snatchers of the New Order
- Thurston Wheelis - A disc jockey at radio station OKKK

== Honors for Greater Tuna ==
Joe Sears

- Following a December 1994 run of A Tuna Christmas on Broadway, Joe Sears received a 1995 Tony Award nomination for best actor in a play.
- Nominee, Outstanding Lead Actor in a Touring Production, Helen Hayes Awards Non-Resident Acting, 1985, 1987

Jaston Williams

- San Francisco Bay Area Critics Award
- L.A. Dramalogue Award
