= Ken Ludwig =

American playwright and theatre director

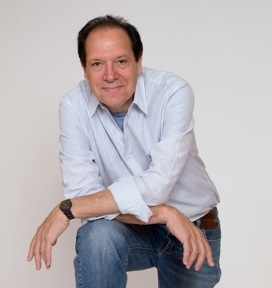
- Born: York, Pennsylvania, US
- Education: Haverford College; Cambridge University, Trinity College; Harvard University
- Occupations: Playwright, theatre director
- Spouse: Adrienne George
- Children: 2

Ken Ludwig is an American playwright, author, screenwriter, and director whose work has been performed in more than 30 countries in over 20 languages. He has had eight productions in London's West End and six productions on Broadway, and his 34 plays and musicals have been staged throughout the United Kingdom and the United States. He has been nominated for and won several awards including the Tony, the Olivier and the Drama Desk Awards.

== Early life and education ==
Ken Ludwig was born in York, Pennsylvania. His father, Jacob S. Ludwig, was a doctor, and his mother, Louise Rabiner Ludwig, was a former Broadway chorus girl.

Ludwig was educated at York Suburban Senior High School, York PA. He received a BA in Music Theory and Composition from Haverford College, where he also studied Shakespeare with Ralph Sargent. At Harvard University, he studied music with Leonard Bernstein. He received his JD from Harvard Law School and an LLM from Cambridge University (Trinity College).

== Theatre career ==
Ken Ludwig's first hit play, Lend Me a Tenor, was produced by Andrew Lloyd Webber for the West End in London in 1986 and on Broadway in 1989. The comedy was nominated for seven Tony Awards, including Best Play, and won two. A revival of Lend Me a Tenor opened on Broadway in 2010, starring Tony Shalhoub, Anthony LaPaglia and Jan Maxwell. It was nominated for three Tony Awards.

His second Broadway and West End production, Crazy for You, is an original musical drawing from the catalogue of George and Ira Gershwin. It opened at the Shubert Theatre (Broadway) in 1992 and ran for over five years in New York. A simultaneous production ran for three years at the Prince Edward Theatre in London from 1993. Crazy for You won the Tony Award, Drama Desk, Outer Critics Circle, LA Drama Critics Circle, and Helen Hayes and Laurence Olivier Awards as Best Musical. The show has been revived twice on the West End, in 2011 and 2023. It was staged in 2017 for a one-night-only concert performance at Lincoln Center.

Ludwig has had three additional plays produced on Broadway. Moon Over Buffalo, which the Boston Herald called "a love letter to theatre", opened at the Martin Beck Theatre (now the Al Hirschfeld Theatre) in 1995 with Carol Burnett and Lynn Redgrave. The same play, under the title Over the Moon, subsequently ran on London's West End at the Old Vic in 2001 in a production starring Frank Langella and Joan Collins.

In 2001, Ludwig conceived and wrote the book for his second musical, an adaptation of The Adventures of Tom Sawyer. It opened at the Minskoff Theatre in 2001 starring Kristen Bell as Becky Thatcher. In 2004, he wrote an adaptation of the classic Ben Hecht-Charles MacArthur play Twentieth Century, which opened on Broadway at the Roundabout Theatre Company's American Airlines Theatre starring Alec Baldwin and Anne Heche. His 2019 comedy-romance, Dear Jack, Dear Louise, which chronicles the story of his parents' courtship through letters during World War II, is currently optioned for Broadway.

Ludwig's other original comedies include Shakespeare in Hollywood, which premiered at Arena Stage in Washington, D.C., in 2003; Leading Ladies, which premiered at the Alley Theatre in association with the Cleveland Play House in 2004, and which Ludwig directed; Be My Baby, which premiered at the Alley Theatre in 2005 starring Hal Holbrook and Dixie Carter; A Fox on the Fairway, which premiered at Signature Theatre in 2010, directed by John Rando; A Comedy of Tenors, featuring the continuing adventures of several characters from Lend Me a Tenor, which premiered as a co-production of the McCarter Theatre Center and the Cleveland Play House in 2015; The Gods of Comedy, which premiered at the McCarter Theatre Center in association with The Old Globe Theatre in 2019; and Lend Me A Soprano, a re-imagining of Lend Me a Tenor featuring women in all the leading roles, which premiered at the Alley Theatre in 2022.

Ludwig has adapted several plays from classical literature and stage. At the invitation of the estate of Thornton Wilder, he completed Wilder's adaptation of George Farquhar's Restoration comedy The Beaux' Stratagem, which opened at the Shakespeare Theatre Company in Washington, D.C., in 2006. Also in 2006, he was commissioned by the Bristol Old Vic to write an adaptation of The Three Musketeers, which premiered in December of that year. Ludwig wrote an adaptation of Robert Louis Stevenson's Treasure Island, which premiered at the Alley Theatre in April 2007, played at the Theatre Royal Haymarket on London's West End the following year, and won the 2009 American Alliance for Theatre & Education (AATE) Distinguished Play Award (Category C—Adaptations from existing children's literature primarily for Pre-K and elementary age audiences). His stage adaptation of the George and Ira Gershwin film An American in Paris premiered at the Alley Theatre in Houston as The Gershwins' An American in Paris in May 2008. In 2011, he adapted Shakespeare's A Midsummer Night's Dream into a contemporary American play for high school and college students titled Midsummer/Jersey. At the request of the Agatha Christie Estate, Ludwig wrote Murder on the Orient Express, a stage adaptation of the novel of the same name, which premiered at the McCarter Theatre Center in 2017. In July of the same year, the world premiere of Sherwood: The Adventures of Robin Hood opened at The Old Globe in San Diego as a commission from the theatre.

The Game's Afoot, Ludwig's comedy-mystery about the actor William Gillette, who originated the role of Sherlock Holmes, premiered at the Cleveland Play House in November 2011, and won the 2012 Edgar Allan Poe Award for Best Mystery of the Year. He continued his association with the Sherlock Holmes character in two additional plays: Baskerville: A Sherlock Holmes Mystery premiered as a co-production at Arena Stage in January 2015 and at McCarter Theatre Center in March 2015; Moriarty: A New Sherlock Holmes Adventure opened at the Cleveland Play House in April 2023. A new mystery-comedy in the style of Baskerville and Moriarty, titled Lady Molly of Scotland Yard, will premiere in the 2024-25 theatrical season.

The world premiere of his first play for children, Twas The Night Before Christmas, opened at The Adventure Theatre Glen Echo Park, Maryland in November 2011. He and his son, Jack Ludwig, co-wrote an adaptation of Charles Dickens' A Christmas Carol entitled Tiny Tim's Christmas Carol, which also premiered at The Adventure Theatre, in November 2014.

Ludwig's first opera, Tenor Overboard, opened in July 2022 at the Glimmerglass Festival Opera House. Set on an ocean liner in the 1930s, this original opera utilizes music from 15 different operas by Italian composer Gioachino Rossini. The world premiere was directed by Francesca Zambello and conducted by Joseph Colaneri.

Other works include Sullivan & Gilbert, which was a co-production of the Kennedy Center for the Performing Arts and the National Arts Centre of Canada. The play was voted Best Play of 1988 by the Ottawa critics. He wrote a new adaptation of Where's Charley? for the Kennedy Center. Other early plays include Divine Fire, the story of Abelard and Eloise, and a mystery, Postmortem. He co-wrote the 1990 Kennedy Center Honors, which appeared on CBS television and received an Emmy Award nomination. Also for television, he wrote a pilot for Carol Channing. For film, he wrote a Lend Me a Tenor screenplay for Columbia Pictures, the original draft of The Muppet Movie for Disney Films and All Shook Up for Touchstone Pictures, directed by Frank Oz.

== Awards ==
Ken Ludwig's first play, Lend Me a Tenor, won two Tony Awards in 1989 and was called "one of the classic comedies of the 20th century" by The Washington Post.

The original Broadway production of Crazy for You won three 1992 Tony Awards, including Best Musical, and two 1992 Drama Desk awards, including Outstanding Musical. The original West End production won three 1993 Olivier Awards, including Best New Musical. The first London revival won two 2012 Olivier Awards, including Best Musical Revival.

Shakespeare in Hollywood won the 2004 Charles MacArthur Award for Outstanding New Play or Musical. Treasure Island won the 2009 American Alliance for Theatre & Education (AATE) Distinguished Play Award (Category C—Adaptations from existing children's literature primarily for Pre-K and elementary age audiences). The Game's Afoot won the 2012 Edgar Award for Best Play from the Mystery Writers of America. He won the 2013 Distinguished Career Award from the Southeastern Theatre Conference. Dear Jack, Dear Louise won the 2020 Charles MacArthur Award for Outstanding New Play or Musical.

In 1997, Ludwig was given the Pennsylvania Governor's Award for Excellence in the Arts, and in 1998, he was given the Edwin Forrest Award for Contributions to the American Theatre. In 2017, he won the Samuel French Award for Sustained Excellence in American Theatre.

Ludwig won the Falstaff Award in 2014 for his book How to Teach Your Children Shakespeare, published by Penguin Random House, in the category of "Best Book, Publication, or Recording".

Ludwig received an honorary doctorate from York University.

He gives the Annual Ken Ludwig Playwriting Scholarship at the Kennedy Center American College Theater Festival, and he served on the Board of Governors of the Folger Shakespeare Library for ten years.

== Personal life ==
Ludwig lives in Washington, D.C. He is married to Adrienne George, and they have two children. His older brother, Eugene Ludwig, served as President Clinton's Comptroller of the Currency.

== Works and credits ==
=== Plays ===
- Be My Baby
- Dear Jack, Dear Louise
- The Gods of Comedy
- Leading Ladies
- Lend Me A Soprano
- Lend Me a Tenor
- Moon Over Buffalo
- Postmortem
- Shakespeare In Hollywood (2003)
- The Fox on the Fairway
- Midsummer/Jersey
- Murder on the Orient Express
- The Game's Afoot
- Twentieth Century
- 'Twas the Night Before Christmas
- The Three Musketeers
- Treasure Island
- The Beaux' Stratagem
- Tiny Tim's Christmas Carol
- Baskerville: A Sherlock Holmes Mystery
- A Comedy of Tenors
- Sherwood: The Adventures of Robin Hood
- Moriarty: A Sherlock Holmes Adventure
- Death on the Nile

=== Musicals ===
- Crazy for You (1992)
- Sullivan and Gilbert (1998)
- The Adventures of Tom Sawyer (2001)
- An American in Paris (2008)
