= Leavitt (surname) =

Leavitt is an Anglo-Norman surname variant or surname and may refer to:

- Abby Fisher Leavitt (1836–1897), American social reformer
- Rev. Ashley Day Leavitt (1877–1959), American Congregational minister
- Benson Leavitt (1797–1869), American businessman
- Rev. Bradford Leavitt (1868–?), pastor of San Francisco's First Unitarian Church
- Caroline Leavitt (born 1952), American novelist
- Charles Wellford Leavitt (1871–1928), American landscape architect, urban planner, and civil engineer
- Dallin Leavitt (born 1994), American football player
- Daniel Leavitt (1801–1851), American inventor
- David Leavitt (1791–1879), New York City banker and financier
- David Leavitt (born 1961), American writer
- Dixie L. Leavitt (1929–2026), American businessman and politician
- Rev. Dudley Leavitt (1720–1762), New Hampshire Congregational minister
- Dudley Leavitt (1830–1908), Mormon pioneer
- Dudley Leavitt (publisher) (1772–1851), American publisher
- Edward Chalmers Leavitt (1842–1904), early New England painter
- Elisha Leavitt (1714–1790), Hingham, Massachusetts landowner
- Emily Wilder Leavitt (1836–1921), American historian and genealogist
- Erasmus Darwin Leavitt, Jr. (1836–1916), mechanical engineer
- Frank McDowell Leavitt (1856–1928), American engineer and inventor
- Frank Simmons Leavitt (1891–1953), American wrestler known as Man Mountain Dean
- George Ayres Leavitt (1822–1888), publisher
- Capt. George Baker Leavitt, Sr. (1860–1925), American mariner
- Harold J. Leavitt (1922–2007), American psychologist of management
- Hart Leavitt (1808–1881), American landowner, legislator and prominent abolitionist
- Hart Day Leavitt (1909–2008), American teacher and amateur jazz musician
- Henrietta Swan Leavitt (1868–1921), American astronomer
- Hiram Leavitt (1824–1901), American settler, innkeeper and judge
- Humphrey H. Leavitt (1796–1873), American congressman and U.S. District Court Judge
- Jeannie Leavitt (born 1967), United States Air Force officer
- Jim Leavitt (born 1956), University of South Florida football coach
- John Leavitt (1608–1691), American tailor, public officeholder, and founding deacon of Old Ship Church
- John Leavitt (Ohio settler) (1755–1815), early Ohio settler in the Western Reserve
- John Faunce Leavitt (1905–1974), shipbuilder, writer, painter and museum curator
- John Hooker Leavitt (1831–1906), American banker and start senator
- John McDowell Leavitt (1824–1909), American lawyer, Episcopal clergyman, poet, novelist, editor and professor
- John Wheeler Leavitt (1790–1870), American businessman
- Jonathan Leavitt (1764–1830), American attorney, judge, state senator and businessman
- Rev. Jonathan Leavitt (minister) (1731–1802), American Congregational minister
- Jonathan Leavitt (publisher) (c. 1797 – 1851), American bookbinder and publisher
- Joseph Leavitt (1757–1839) American soldier and Quaker
- Rev. Joshua Leavitt (1794–1873), American Congregationalist minister
- Dr. Josiah Leavitt (1744–1804), American physician and inventor
- Josie Leavitt, American politician
- Judith Walzer Leavitt (born 1940), University of Wisconsin–Madison professor of history of medicine
- Karoline Claire Leavitt (born 1997), American political aide serving as the White House press secretary for Donald Trump's second administration
- L. Brooks Leavitt (1878–1941), American investment banker and antiquarian book collector
- Laurence G. Leavitt (1903–2000), American headmaster
- Lewis Leavitt, American medical director and professor of pediatrics
- Martine Leavitt, Canadian-American author for young adults
- Mary Greenleaf Clement Leavitt (1830–1912), American temperance educator and orator
- Michael Leavitt (artist) (born 1977), American sculptor, painter and educator
- Michael O. Leavitt (born 1951), American politician
- Moses Leavitt (1650–1730), American surveyor, selectman, Deputy and Moderator of the General Court
- Myron E. Leavitt (1930–2004), American politician
- Norman Leavitt (1913–2005), American film and television actor
- Ralph Leavitt (1877–?), American automobile dealer and fugitive
- Bud Leavitt Jr. (1917–1994), executive sports editor for The Bangor Daily News
- Raphy Leavitt (1948–2015), Puerto Rican composer
- Richard Leavitt (1958–2012), American murderer
- Robert Leavitt (hurdler) (1883–1954), American Olympic athlete
- Robert Greenleaf Leavitt (1865–1942), American botanist
- Robert Keith Leavitt (1895–1967), American copywriter and author
- Col. Roger Hooker Leavitt (1805–1885), American abolitionist and operator of Underground Railroad station
- Ron Leavitt (1947–2008), American television writer and producer
- Lieut. Samuel Leavitt (1641–1707), early settler, deputy and member of New Hampshire House of Representatives
- Scott Leavitt (1879–1966), American Forest Service ranger, Spanish–American War veteran and member of the U.S. House of Representatives
- Sturgis Elleno Leavitt (1888–1976), graduate, Bowdoin College, Harvard, author, Professor of Spanish, University of North Carolina
- Thaddeus Leavitt (1750–1826), American merchant, inventor and patentee of Western Reserve lands
- Thomas Leavitt (banker) (1795–1850), Canadian banker, businessman and diplomat
- Thomas Leavitt (inventor) (1827–1899), American inventor
- Thomas Leavitt (settler) (c. 1615–1696), English puritan and settler of New Hampshire
- Thomas Rowell Leavitt (1834–1891), Canadian sheriff, Mormon and early settler of Leavitt, Alberta
- Tristan Leavitt, American attorney
- William Homer Leavitt (1868–1951), American portrait painter

== See also ==
- Levett
- Levitt
