= Thomas Leavitt =

Thomas Leavitt may refer to:

- Thomas Leavitt (banker) (1795–1850), president of the Bank of New Brunswick, diplomat, politician and businessman
- Thomas Leavitt (inventor) (1827–1899), American inventor
- Thomas Leavitt (settler) (1616–1696), English Puritan and settler of the Province of New Hampshire
- Thomas Rowell Leavitt (1834–1891), Mormon settler of Leavitt, Alberta, Canada
