= Victor Channing Sanborn =

American genealogist

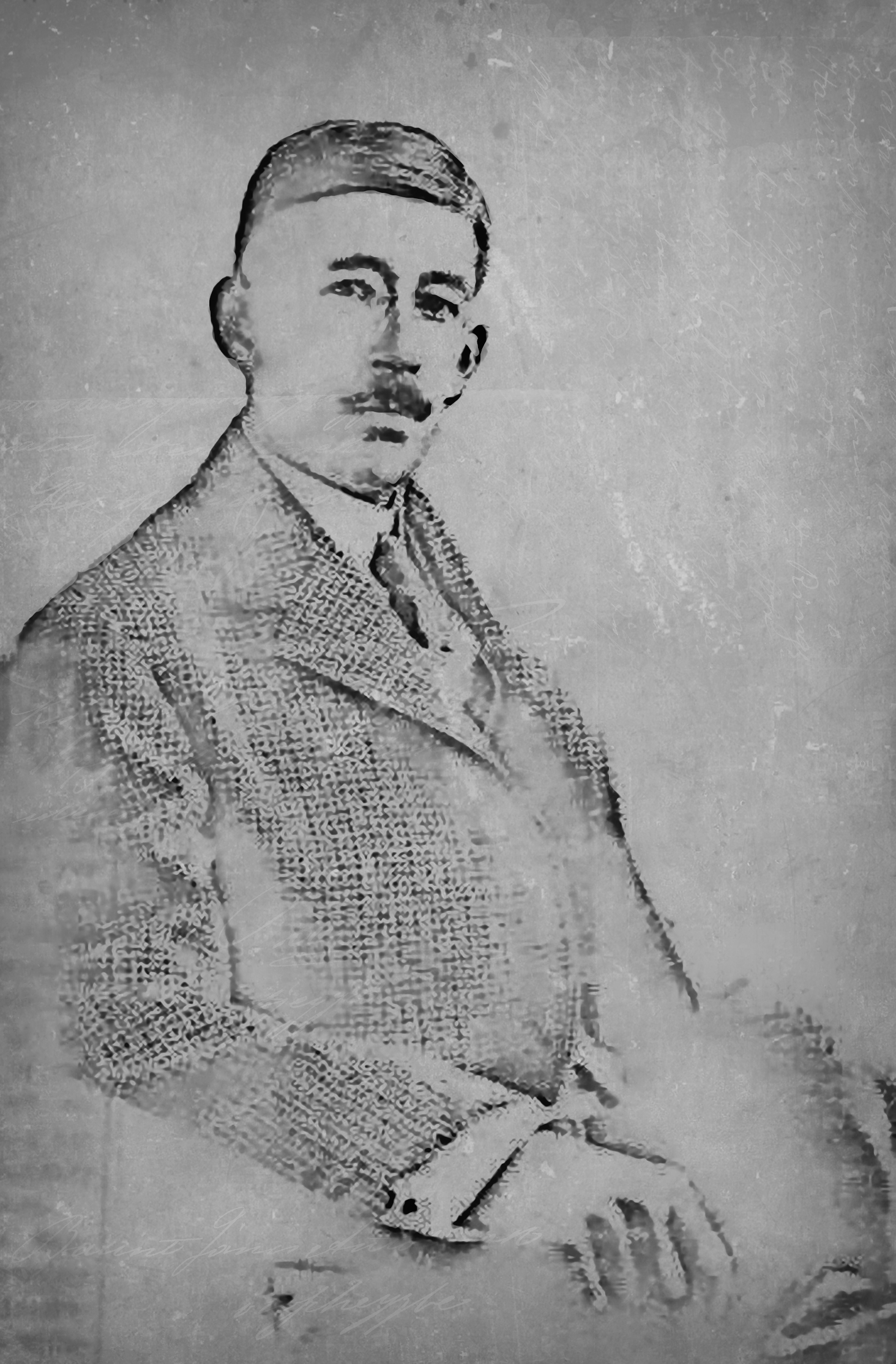
- Born: April 24, 1867; Concord, Massachusetts, US
- Died: January 13, 1921 (aged 53); Chicago, Illinois, US
- Resting place: Graceland Cemetery
- Known for: Genealogy of the Sanborn Family
- Spouse: Louise W. Kirkland
- Children: 3

Signature
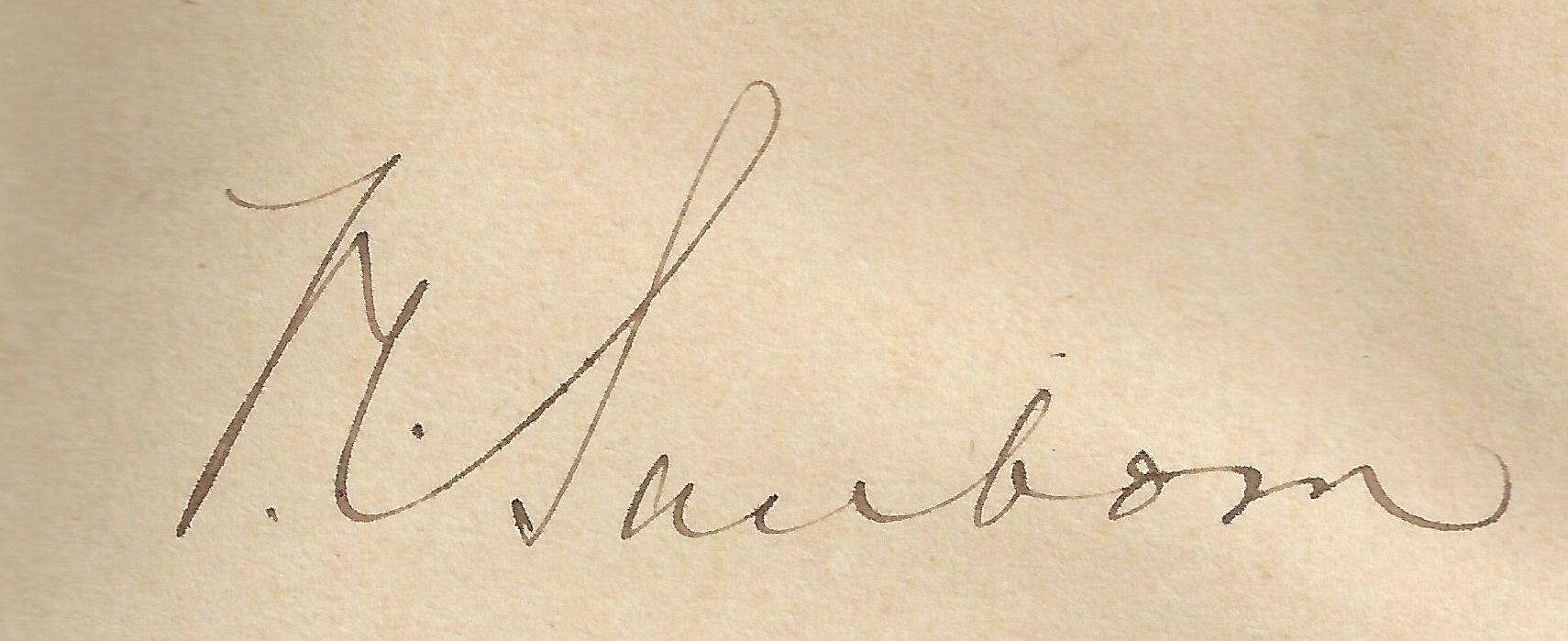

Victor Channing Sanborn (April 24, 1867 – January 13, 1921) was an American genealogist whose documentation of the Sanborn line and other genealogical studies continue to be reliable source material.

== Early years ==
Victor Channing Sanborn was born in Concord, Massachusetts, to Louisa (née Leavitt) and Franklin Benjamin Sanborn, and was named in honor of the poet Ellery Channing. He was prepared for college in the public schools of Concord, graduating from high school at the age of sixteen, but due to poor health was prevented from entering Harvard College as planned. In 1885, however, he spent a term as an unmatriculated student at Cornell University.

== Professional life ==
On January 1, 1886, Sanborn began office work in Omaha, Nebraska, for the Burlington & Missouri River Railroad under the auditor of freight and passenger account. After a few months he was promoted to the passenger department, and for two years served as secretary to P.S. Eustis, general passenger agent.

In 1888, Eustis was transferred to Chicago to take charge of the passenger department of the Chicago, Burlington & Quincy Railroad, and Sanborn went with him as his secretary. Two years later, Victor Sanborn was promoted to assistant clerk, and two years after that to chief clerk. He resigned January 1, 1898, and engaged in the real estate business in Chicago, entering the office of Clarance A. Burley. As an attorney involved in real estate, Clarence Burley's goal was to help re-build Chicago following the Great Fire, having watched his family-home burn. Burley and Sanborn were eventually partners in this real estate venture. Although Sanborn remained engaged in the business of real estate for the remainder of his life as an agent with The Kenilworth Company, he received from his father an interest in genealogy.

The Sanborn Genealogical Association was formed in 1853 for the purpose of compiling a family history. The Recording Secretary, Dr. Nathan Sanborn, first published his research in 1856 in the New England Historic Genealogical Register. This article, also published in pamphlet form, was one of the earliest American genealogies printed. Dr. Sanborn died in 1858 and his records were given to the SGA's president, Dyer H. Sanborn, who continued research and extensive correspondence until his death in 1871.

Victor Sanborn became interested in continuing this research. By the age of seventeen, Sanborn had searched the Hampton Falls and Exeter, New Hampshire, records, laying the foundation for a book on the Samborne - Sanborn Genealogy in an article for The New England Historical and Genealogical Register of July 1885, when he was eighteen. The first edition of his book, The Genealogy of the Family of Samborne or Sanborn in England and America, 1194-1898, was published in 1887 when Sanborn was twenty years old, receiving favorable reviews from the beginning, including one in The Nation stating, "This is one of those stupendous volumes peculiar to this country, which are without a parallel elsewhere."

Sanborn's continued research and refinement of the Sanborn genealogical record took him to England and the European continent in 1895 and again in 1913, resulting in a source which remains foremost in the study of this family's history into the early twentieth century, and one of the best family genealogies in existence. Sanborn also wrote an authoritative work on his ancestors Stephen Bachiler and Thomas Leavitt.

Victor Sanborn was a member of the New Hampshire Historical Society, the Chicago Historical Society, the Lincolnshire (England) Record Society, and various literary, social, and athletic organizations in Chicago.

== Personal life ==
On May 28, 1891, Sanborn married Louise Wilkinson Kirkland, daughter of author Joseph Kirkland and granddaughter of author Caroline Kirkland; they remained in the Chicago area, building a home in Kenilworth, Illinois, in 1900. The couple volunteered actively in local concerns, Victor serving as President of the Village and President of the Kenilworth Club, and Louise as Kenilworth Historical Society President. The Sanborns had at least one son who died in infancy and two daughters who survived through adulthood.

Victor Channing Sanborn died January 13, 1921, of pneumonia, following a short illness. He was fifty-three years old. It seems that while there are grave markers for Victor and Louise in Sleepy Hollow Cemetery, Concord, these are only memorials and the location of their true burial is Graceland Cemetery in Chicago.

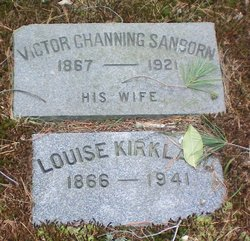
Tribute markers to Victor Sanborn and his wife Louise, Sleepy Hollow Cemetery

== Works ==
- Sanborn family in the United States, and a brief sketch of life of John B. Sanborn, 1887 is online at
- Notes on the English Ancestry of the Following American Families: Samborne or Sanborn; Bachiler or Batcheller; Blake; Levet, Lovet, Leavitt; Kirtland or Kirkland, 1894, is online at
- American and English Sambornes, 1895, is online at
- The First Sambornes of Hampton in New Hampshire, 1897, is online at
- Genealogy of the family of Samborne or Sanborn in England and America, 1194-1898 (Volume 1), Privately printed for the author by the Rumford Press, Concord, N.H.,1899, is online at
- Genealogy of the family of Samborne or Sanborn in England and America, 1194-1898 (Volume 2), Privately printed for the author by the Rumford Press, Concord, N.H.,1899, is online at
- Stephen Bachiler and the Plough company of 1630, 1903, is online at
- An Unforgiven Puritan — Biography of Rev. Stephen Bachiler, 1903, is online at
- Thomas Levet of Exeter and Hampton, New Hampshire, 1913, is online at
- The Lincolnshire Origin of Some Exeter Settlers, 1914, is online at
- The English Ancestry of the American Sanborns: A Supplement to the Samborne-Sanborn Genealogy, 1916, is online at
- The Grantees and Settlement of Hampton, New Hampshire, 1917, is online at

== See also ==
- Franklin Benjamin Sanborn
- Thomas Parker Sanborn
