= Franklin Benjamin Sanborn =

American reformer and social scientist (1831–1917)

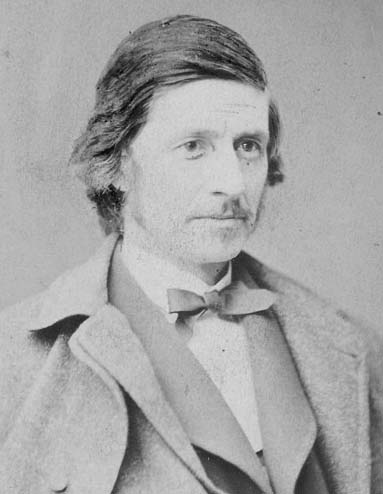
- Born: December 15, 1831; Hampton Falls, New Hampshire, US
- Died: February 24, 1917 (aged 85); Plainfield, New Jersey, US
- Resting place: Sleepy Hollow Cemetery, Concord, Massachusetts
- Occupations: Journalist; author; historian; abolitionist; social reformer
- Children: Thomas Parker Sanborn, Victor Channing Sanborn, Francis Bachiler Sanborn

Signature
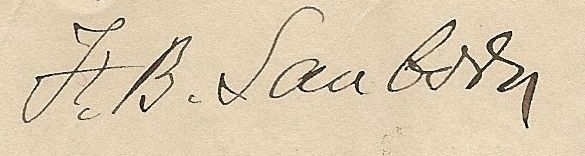

Franklin Benjamin Sanborn (December 15, 1831 – February 24, 1917) was an American journalist, teacher, author, reformer, and abolitionist. Sanborn was a social scientist and memorialist of American transcendentalism who wrote early biographies of many of the movement's key figures. He founded the American Social Science Association in 1865 "to treat wisely the great social problems of the day". He was a member of the so-called Secret Six, or "Committee of Six", which funded or helped obtain funding for John Brown's Raid on Harpers Ferry; in fact, he introduced Brown to the others.

== Biography ==
=== Early years and education ===
Franklin Sanborn was born at Hampton Falls, New Hampshire, the son of Aaron and Lydia (Leavitt) Sanborn. He already believed himself capable of making a stir in the world by the age of two, having held up a stick in a thunderstorm and experienced being struck by lightning. At age nine, following careful reading of the abolitionist newspapers The National Era and Horace Greeley's New-York Tribune, Franklin announced to his family that slavery was wrong and the United States Constitution should be revised or revoked.

In 1850, at the suggestion of his future wife Ariana Walker, Sanborn arranged to study with the Exeter teacher and private tutor John Gibson Hoyt. He would focus on Greek for a year, then enter Phillips Exeter Academy. This was followed by enrollment at Harvard, from which he graduated in 1855. His classmate and friend at Harvard was Edwin Morton, who would be employed by Gerrit Smith as tutor and private secretary.

=== Professional life ===
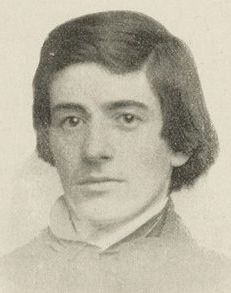
Frank Sanborn at age 21

Sanborn was active in politics as a member of the Free Soil Party in New Hampshire and Massachusetts. In 1856, he became secretary of the Massachusetts State Kansas Committee and came into close touch with John Brown. Sanborn was one of six influential men who supplied Brown with support for the raid on Harpers Ferry of October 16–18, 1859. This group was later termed the Secret Six. Although Sanborn disavowed advance knowledge of the attack, he defended Brown to the end of his life, assisted in the support of Brown's widow and children, and made periodic pilgrimages to his grave. He was present at the 1882 burial of Watson Brown beside his father.

On the night of April 3, 1860, five federal marshals arrived at Frank Sanborn's home in Concord, Massachusetts, handcuffed him, and attempted to wrestle him into a coach and take him to Washington to answer questions before the Senate in regard to his involvement with John Brown. Approximately 150 townspeople rushed to Sanborn's defense, aroused by church bells. Judge Lemuel Shaw issued a writ of habeas corpus, formally demanding the surrender of the prisoner. In a letter to a friend, Louisa May Alcott wrote, "Sanborn was nearly kidnapped. Great ferment in town. Annie Whiting immortalized herself by getting into the kidnapper's carriage so that they could not put the long-legged martyr in."

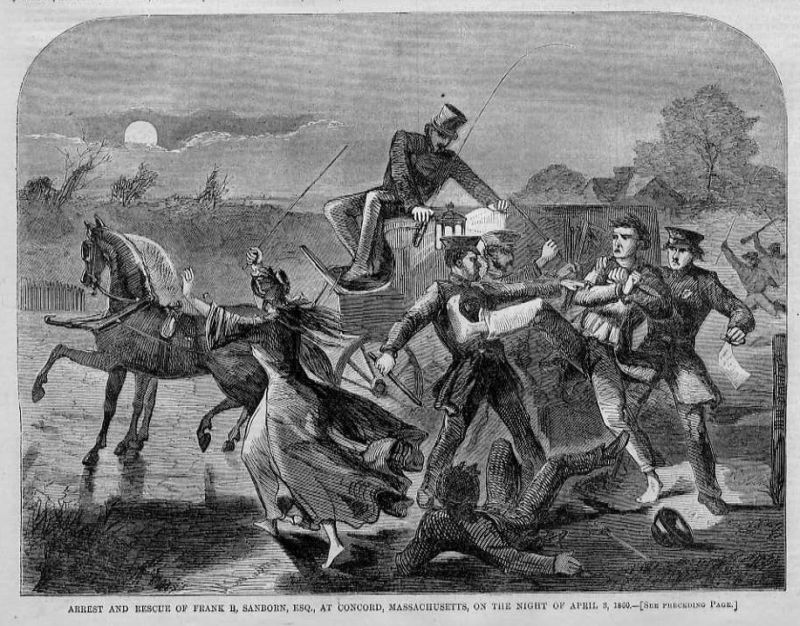
Frank Sanborn of Concord, Massachusetts, resists arrest by federal marshals in regard to his support of abolitionist John Brown.

From 1863 to 1868, Sanborn was an editor of The Commonwealth newspaper of Boston, from 1867 to 1897 of the Journal of Social Science, and from 1868 to 1914 a correspondent of the Springfield Republican. He was one of the founders of, and was closely identified with, the American Social Science Association (secretary 1865–1897), the National Prison Association, the National Conference of Charities, the Clarke School for the Deaf, the Massachusetts Infant Asylum, and the Concord School of Philosophy. He lectured at Cornell, Smith, and Wellesley.

In October 1863, he became secretary of the Massachusetts State Board of Charities, the first established in America. He was secretary from 1863 to 1868, a member from 1870 to 1876, and chairman from 1874 to 1876. In 1875, he made a searching investigation into the abuses of the Tewksbury almshouse, resulting in that institution being reformed. In 1879, he helped to reorganize the system of Massachusetts charities, with special reference to the care of children and insane persons, in July 1879 becoming State Inspector of Charities under the new board, serving until 1888.

=== Personal life ===
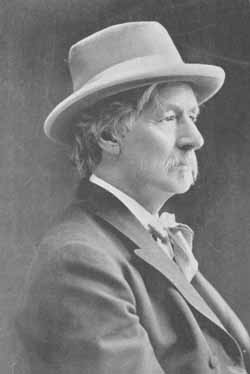
Franklin Sanborn in 1900

Sanborn lived in Concord, Massachusetts. He was twice married, first to Ariana Walker in 1854 for eight days until she died. Following his first wife's death, Sanborn courted nineteen-year-old Edith Emerson, the daughter of Ralph Waldo Emerson of Concord. (Sanborn's aunt Miss Alice Leavitt, his mother's sister, was personal nurse to Ralph Waldo Emerson's widow Lydian.) Sanborn ultimately proposed to Miss Emerson in 1861 and was rejected. He apparently took offense and launched into a series of letters to Miss Emerson's mother. Those letters apparently inflamed the Emerson family, with the result that Ralph Waldo drafted a chilly letter to Sanborn, informing Sanborn of Emerson's wife's displeasure at having been accused. The matter did not end happily, with Mrs. Emerson writing her own letter of reproach to Sanborn.

Ultimately, Sanborn begrudgingly apologized and moved on. He married as his second wife his cousin Louisa Augusta Leavitt in 1862—said to look enough like Sanborn to be his sister—the daughter of Sanborn's uncle Joseph Melcher Leavitt, a Boston merchant (Sanborn's other uncle was Benson Leavitt, once a partner of his wife's father and later acting mayor of Boston). Louisa Leavitt had worked as a schoolteacher at the Concord school Sanborn founded. The couple were married at the Church of the Disciples in Boston by abolitionist minister James Freeman Clarke. They had three sons, the poet Thomas Parker Sanborn, the genealogist Victor Channing Sanborn, and Francis Bachiler Sanborn.

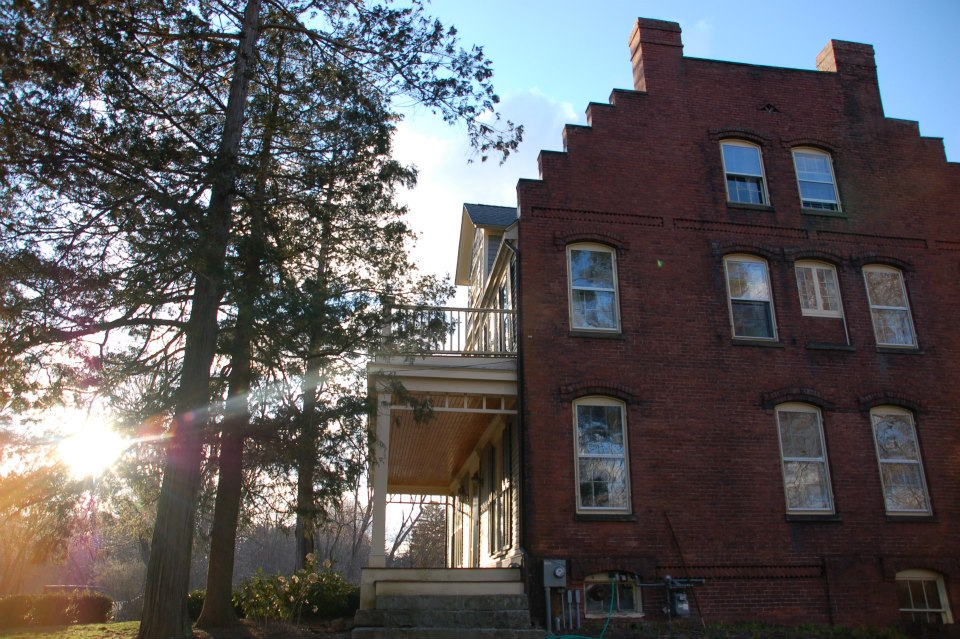
The Sanborn home in Concord

In 1880, Frank Sanborn built a large house on the banks of the Sudbury River in Concord, placing a plaque with the name of his first wife, Ariana, in a gable end. It was in this home that the Sanborns' eldest son, Tom, committed suicide in 1889, at the age of twenty-four, after which the Sanborns stayed for several months in the Emerson home. In 1891 Frank Sanborn moved his ailing and elderly friend, transcendental poet and walking-companion of Thoreau, Ellery Channing, into his home, where Channing subsequently died in 1901. Although the Sanborns' second son, Victor Channing Sanborn, was engaged in real estate for a living, he wrote frequently about his father and authored a book researching their ancestor Thomas Leavitt's origins.

=== Death and significance ===
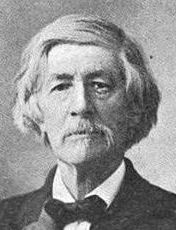
Photo of an elderly FBS from his obituary in The Harvard Crimson

Frank Sanborn died February 24, 1917, of a broken hip after being struck by a railroad baggage cart during a visit to his son Francis in New Jersey. He was buried at Sleepy Hollow Cemetery in Concord, near the graves of his friends and mentors Ralph Waldo Emerson, Bronson Alcott, Ellery Channing, and Henry Thoreau. Concord's flags were flown at half-mast for three days. At the end of the month, February, 1917, just prior to America's entering World War I, the Massachusetts House of Representatives recognized Sanborn's dedication to the unfortunate, the diseased, and the despised, citing Sanborn's role as a confidential adviser to John Brown, "for whose sake he was arrested, mistreated, and nearly deported."

Sanborn was loved and hated. Walt Whitman described Sanborn as "a fighter, up in arms, a devotee, a revolutionary crusader, hot in the collar, quick on the trigger, noble, optimistic."Henry David Thoreau feared the passionate Concord schoolteacher was "only too steadfast and earnest", a type, as Thoreau put it, "that calmly, so calmly, ignites and then throws bomb after bomb." Sanborn lived a long life. He was revered in the end as a relic from a golden age gone by—a tall and venerable figure moving picturesquely through Boston and Concord.

== Works (in order of publication) ==
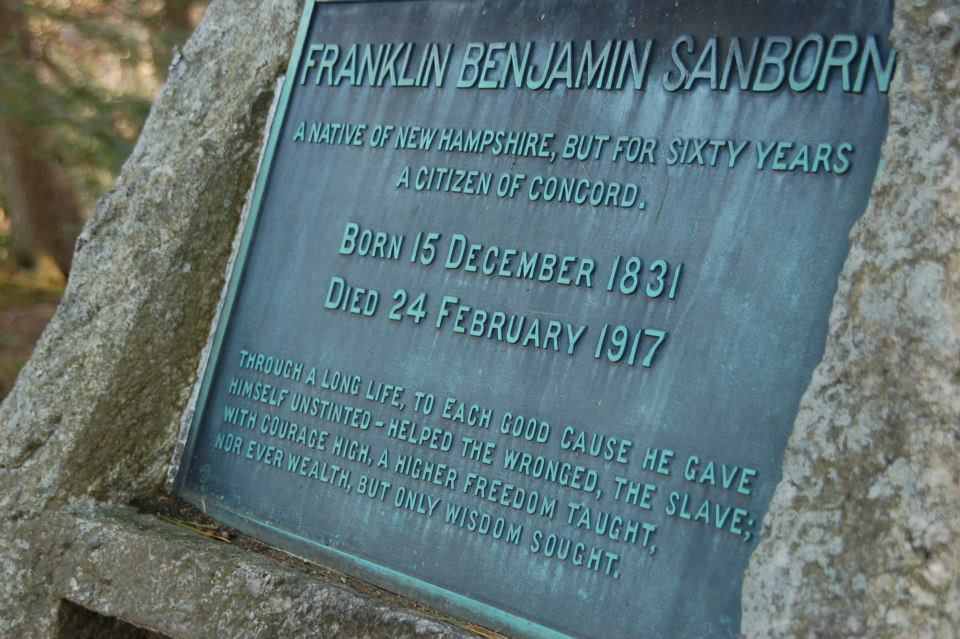
Gravestone of F. B. Sanborn in Sleepy Hollow Cemetery, Concord, Massachusetts

- Thoreau (1872)
- Brown, John (1891) [1885]. Sanborn, F. B. (ed.). Life and Letters of John Brown, Liberator of Kansas, and Martyr of Virginia. Edited by F. B. Sanborn (2nd ed.). Boston: Roberts Brothers. (Review of 1st edition.)
- Dr. S. G. Howe (1891)
- A. Bronson Alcott: His Life and Philosophy (with William Torrey Harris) (1893)
- Emerson (1895)
- Earle, Pliny (1898). Sanborn, Franklin Benjamin (ed.). Memoirs of Pliny Earle, M.D.: With Extracts from His Diary and Letters (1830–1892) and Selections from his Professional Writings (1839–1891). Edited, with a General Introduction, by F. B. Sanborn, of Concord, Former Chairman of the Board of State Charities of Massachusetts, and Inspector of Charities. Boston: Damrell & Upham.
- John Brown and His Friends (unknown, but after 1900)
- Howe, Samuel Gridley (1909). Richards, Laura Elizabeth Howe; Sanborn, Franklin Benjamin (eds.). Letters and Journals of Samuel Gridley Howe, edited by his daughter, Laura E. Richards. With notes by F. B. Sanborn. Boston: D. Estes.
- Personality of Thoreau (1902)
- Personality of Emerson (1903)
- A History of New Hampshire (1904)
- Hawthorne and His Friends (1908)
- Bronson Alcott at Fruitlands (1908)
- Recollections of Seventy Years (1909)
- Thoreau and his Earliest Writings (1914)
- Sixty years in Concord (1916)

He contributed largely to the Proceedings of the Massachusetts Historical Society (1903–15). He also edited two volumes of Theodore Parker's Writings (1914), introduced Newton's Lincoln and Herndon (1913), and wrote brief biographies of Ellery Channing and of Mrs. Abbott-Wood of Lowell. He edited for the Boston Bibliophile Society five volumes of Thoreau's manuscripts, a volume of the Shelley-Payne correspondence, and one of the Fragments and Letters of T. L. Peacock. He edited writings of Paul Jones.

== Archival material ==
Manuscripts and letters are held by the Houghton Library, Harvard University.

== See also ==
- Thomas Parker Sanborn
- Victor Channing Sanborn
- Secret Six
