= Joseph Kirkland (disambiguation) =

Joseph Kirkland may refer to:

- Joseph Kirkland (politician) (1770-1844), American politician
- Joseph Kirkland (1830-1894), American novelist
- Joe Kirkland (footballer, born 1873), Irish footballer, see List of Bury F.C. players (1–24 appearances)
- Diamond D (Joseph Kirkland, Born 1968), American hip hop MC and record producer

== See also ==
- Joe Kirkland, member of Artist vs. Poet
