= Lowell M. Palmer =

American industrialist 1845-1915

- Born: Lowell Mason Palmer; March 11, 1845; Ohio, United States
- Died: 1915 (aged 69–70)
- Occupation: Industrialist
- Known for: Incorporating Bristol-Myers Squibb

Lowell Mason Palmer (1845-1915) was an American industrialist and philanthropist. He is noted for incorporating and significantly expanding Bristol-Myers Squibb. He is also recognized for his charitable contributions to New York’s cultural, educational, and religious institutions.

== Early life and education ==
Palmer was born on March 11, 1845, in Ohio. He was the son of Chester Palmer, a merchant who made a fortune in trading wool. Palmer was educated in public schools and, during the latter part of the Civil War, attended Western Reserve College.

== Career ==
=== Palmer Docks ===
Before his involvement in the pharmaceutical industry, Palmer made a name for himself in the transportation and sugar industries. He started operating a cooper shop in Brooklyn, which manufactured barrels for the great sugar refineries in the East River. Noting the inefficiencies of the transportation of his materials through barges and car floats from the New York and Jersey City railroad, he decided to establish his facility, called Palmer Docks in 1845. This included a float bridge and tracks with an accompanying locomotive and car float to transport his cars of cooperage.

Palmer Docks would later service the sugar refineries and others who wanted to use his docks, receiving shipped freight as agent of the Erie. After building a railroad at the terminus of North 5th Street, many industries also started using the facility, so that it emerged as a major transfer station for freight. After losing traffic to Palmer Docks, the New York Central station sought and completed a deal with Palmer. The resulting venture significantly expanded Palmer Docks. It became the genesis of the Union Freight Terminal.

In 1899, Palmer became the Director in the American Sugar Refining Company and served in this capacity until January 11, 1905. At some point during his tenure, he was also identified as the person in charge of the handling of the company’s railroad business. He would also become the president of the Brooklyn Eastern District Terminal. His business ventures allowed Palmer the financial leverage to acquire businesses in emerging markets. These included his investment in E.R. Squibb & Sons.

=== Bristol-Myers Squibb ===
In 1905, Palmer, together with Theodore Weicker, bought E.R. Squibb and Sons from the sons of Edward Squibb. Palmer and Weicker incorporated the company and latter served as the President of the company. Due to failing health, he resigned in 1908. His son, who was then serving as Vice-President, succeeded him. His tenure at the pharmaceutical company was marked by significant expansion. By 1951, under the younger Palmer’s management, Squibb’s annual sales reached $100 million, making it one of the largest pharmaceutical companies in the United States.

== Philanthropy ==
Palmer supported educational and arts institutions such as the Brooklyn Institute of Arts and Sciences (now Brooklyn Museum). He had also funded the maintenance and preservation of New York’s religious structures, such as the Emmanuel Baptist Church.
