= Thomas Parker Sanborn =

American poet

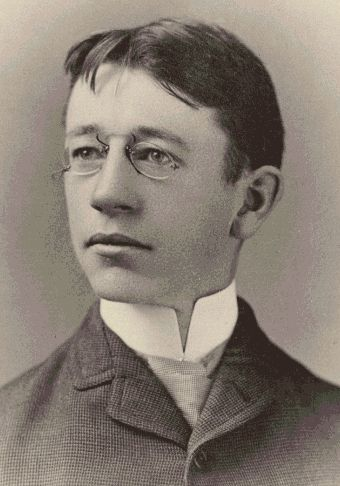
- Senior Picture, Harvard Class of 1886
- Born: February 24, 1865; Concord, Massachusetts, US
- Died: March 2, 1889 (aged 24); Concord, Massachusetts, US
- Resting place: Sleepy Hollow Cemetery, Concord
- Occupations: poet, writer
- Known for: co-founder of The Harvard Monthly

Signature
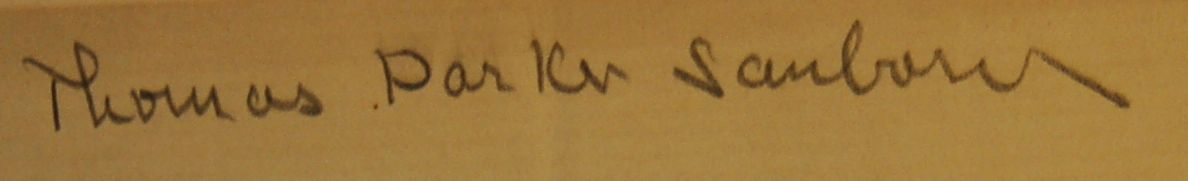

Thomas Parker Sanborn (/ˈsænbɔːrn, -bərn/; February 24, 1865 – March 2, 1889) was an American poet. The eldest son of abolitionist, social scientist, and memorialist of American transcendentalism Franklin Benjamin Sanborn, Thomas became a close friend of philosopher George Santayana and was a model for the protagonist in Santayana's only novel, The Last Puritan. With five college friends, Thomas founded The Harvard Monthly.

== Early life ==
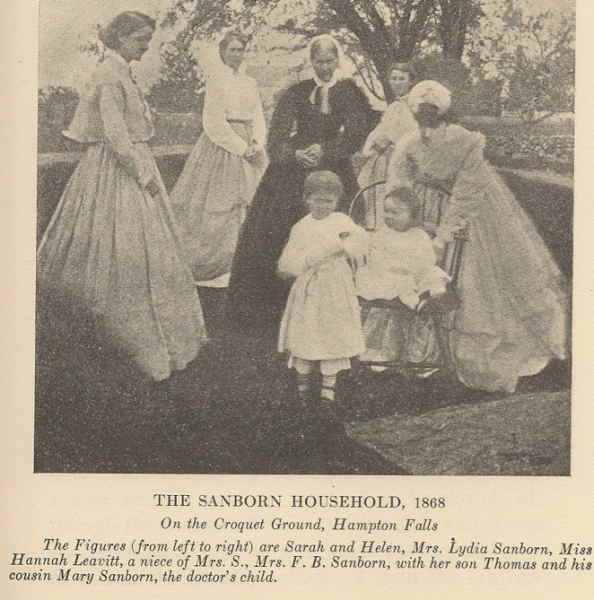
Sanborn Family in 1868, with young Tom positioned in a Windsor chair, his mother Louisa behind him

Thomas Parker Sanborn was born to Franklin Benjamin Sanborn and Louisa Sanborn, née Leavitt, on February 24, 1865, in Concord, Massachusetts in a cottage on the grounds of The Old Manse. He was named "Thomas" for Henry David Thoreau's friend, Thomas Cholmondeley and "Parker" for Theodore Parker. His schooling began in Springfield but was seriously undertaken only after his family returned to Concord in 1872, where Tom studied in the primary schools and was taught Latin and Greek by his father, who had been charged with educating children of Ralph Waldo Emerson, Amos Bronson Alcott, Horace Mann, John Brown and others of prominence.

His brother Victor Channing Sanborn would later write, "He was a sensitive and original child, much noticed by his elders, especially by Mr. Emerson and Ellery Channing,-- going to walk with the latter and with his father, as soon as he was able to keep up with older persons, in the wood-roads and pastures of Concord,-- their custom on Sunday afternoons for many years."

During the winter of 1880–1881, Thomas was a student at Phillips Exeter Academy in Exeter, following in the foot-steps of his father, also an alumnus.

== Harvard years ==
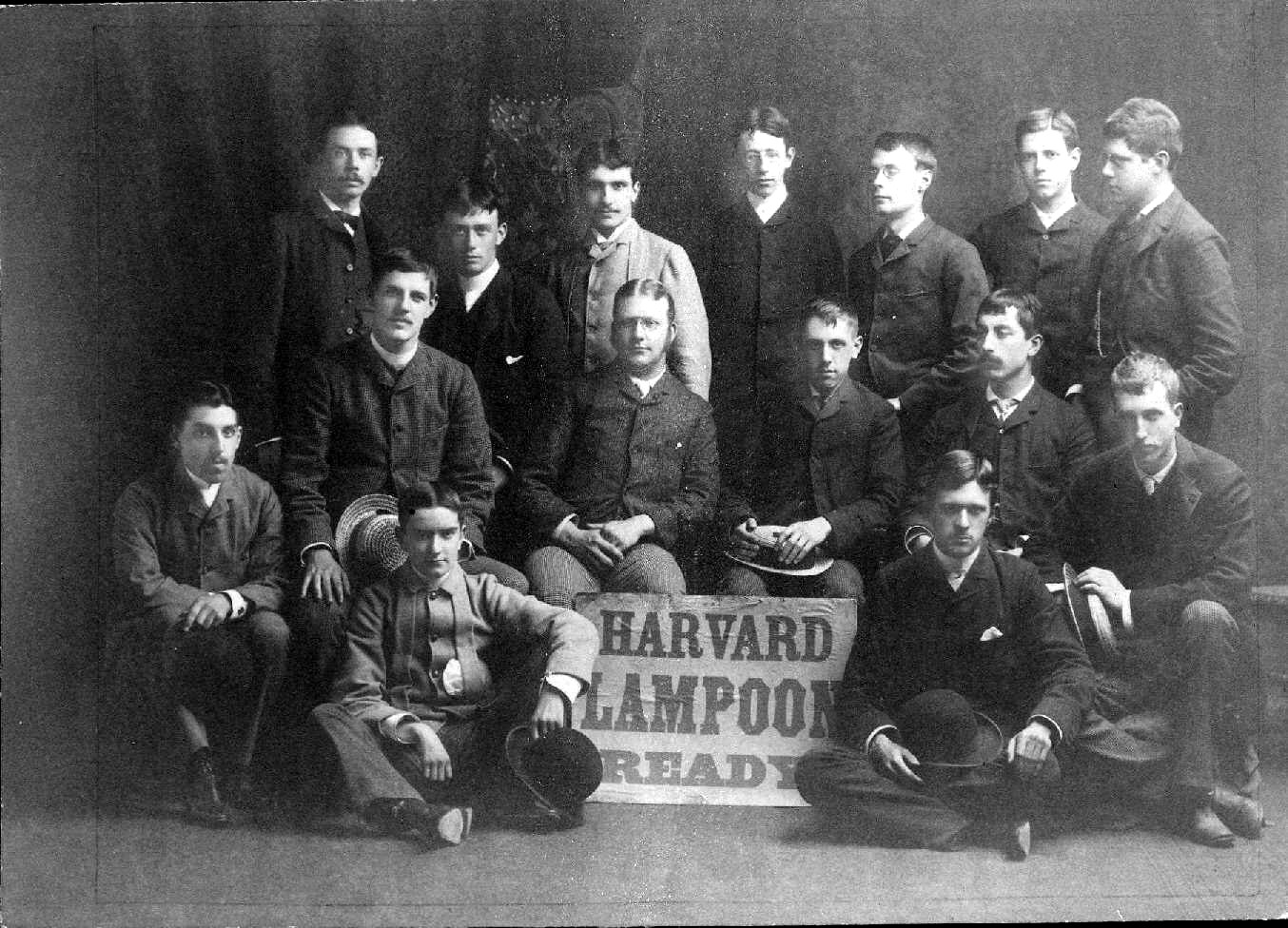
1885 staff of The Harvard Lampoon. Tom Sanborn standing in back, 4th from the right

In 1882, Sanborn began college life at Harvard University, where, in addition to required course-work, he became an editor of Harvard's literary journal, the Harvard Advocate and the humor magazine, the Harvard Lampoon. Sanborn was elected president of the Lampoon following Ernest Thayer, who would subsequently achieve fame with his Lampoon-esque poem, "Casey at the Bat".

"Thayer's Harvard Lampoon staff was talented and privileged. Future philosopher George Santayana was an editor who focused on illustrations, and William Randolph Hearst, the inspiration for Citizen Kane, was a business editor. Thayer was neither the most accomplished nor prolific poet of his peer group; most of his contributions were brief 'insider' prose pieces. The Lampoon's premier poet, Thomas Parker Sanborn, succeeded Thayer as editor (president) in 1886."

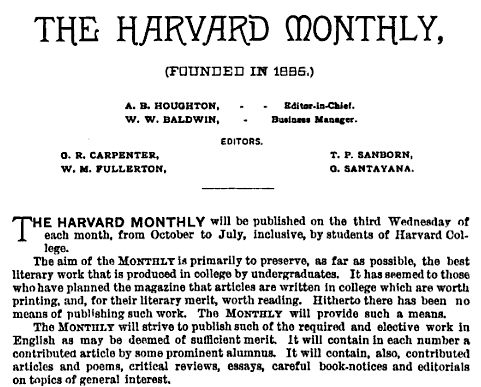
First page of Vol.1 The Harvard Monthly, October 1885

In the fall of 1885, Sanborn and five of his literary cohorts, Harvard seniors William Woodward Baldwin, Alanson B. Houghton, George Santayana, William Morton Fullerton, and George Rice Carpenter founded The Harvard Monthly. Dedicated to defending Arnoldian humanism and aestheticism from the encroaching forces of scientific materialism, the Monthly sought to introduce its readers to the European culture that American society needed to emulate, and for the next decade served as a springboard for Santayana's contribution to the Arnoldian movement. The Monthly would come to be described as "proof... of the undergraduate cultivation of creative, critical and persuasive letters that still distinguishes the university...from most others in America." This "proof" would also lie in the fact of the Monthly's many graduates who went on to make significant contributions to the world.

Sanborn became a close friend of philosopher and fellow poet Santayana, with whom he graduated in the class of 1886. Freshmen were seated alphabetically, so the two found each other side-by-side in several classes in addition to sharing in the editorship of Harvard literary magazines and membership in several social groups, which included Art Club, Chess Club, the OK Society and the Everett Atheneum. In December 1885, they shared the stage in the Hasty Pudding Theatrical, Robin Hood, followed by the production Papillonetta the following spring. Sanborn's interest in history led him to win the Bowdoin Prize for a dissertation on The Rights and Duties of a Biographer in his junior year. As a graduating senior, he was selected to write the class ode and presented it as part of the festivities on Class Day.

Class Ode
(Harvard Class of 1886)

I.
Dear Mother, we leave thee to join the race
Where no man may weaken or yield,
And we look once again at thy beautiful face
And the word that is wrought on they shield.

Thou has taught us to strive, thou hast taught us to dare
In the years that forever have flown!
Farewell to three Mother, whose bountiful care
In the fulness of youth we have known.

II.
There is hope in our hearts, there is light in our eyes
As we dream of the goal set before;
Though we linger, unwilling to break the old ties,
That shall bind us, alas, nevermore.

The ties may be severed, they'll ne'er be forgot,
Our hearts are forever the same.
From our thought, from our love, we will banish thee not:
Dear Mother, we'll win in thy name.

== Illness and death ==
Upon graduation, Sanborn began living in Springfield, Massachusetts, where he had already begun work on the staff of the Republican, becoming the paper's "literary and dramatic sub-editor." His health, described by some as "precarious", declined in the spring of 1888; ultimately, he chose to return to Concord in the fall, where he continued to contribute to The Republican each week. Although his physical health improved, his depression increased. Suffering from hallucinations, Thomas Sanborn committed suicide on March 2, 1889. According to an account in the March 4, 1889 Boston Journal, Thomas slit his throat with a razor in the bathroom of the family home in Concord. He was found alive by his father, who broke down the bathroom door. A doctor was summoned but Thomas could not be saved. He was twenty-four years old.

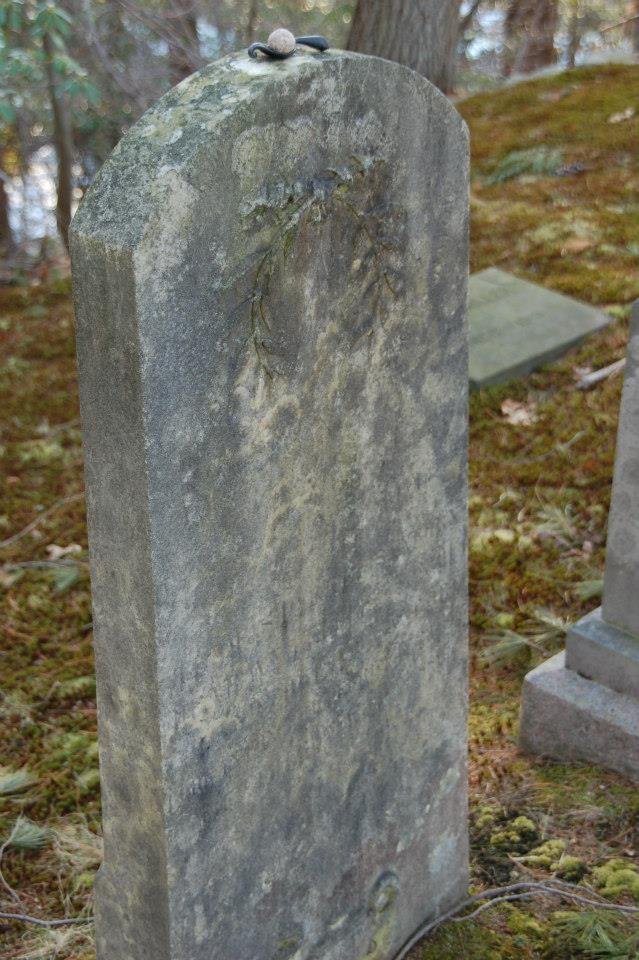
Gravestone of Thomas Parker Sanborn on Author's Ridge in Sleepy Hollow Cemetery, Concord

In a March 6, 1889 obituary Franklin B. Sanborn provided The Republican it is stated that "[Tom's] passage from one mansion in the father's house to another was swift and we trust merciful." Thomas Sanborn locked himself in the bathroom at 3:30; the doctor pronounced him dead at 4:13.

After a private service in the family's home, attended by members of the Emerson, Leavitt and Hoar families and college friends that included George Santayana, Thomas Parker Sanborn was buried in Sleepy Hollow Cemetery not far from Thoreau and Emerson. His brother Victor Channing Sanborn later documented that the stone marking Tom's grave was carved of Pentelic marble in Athens, "with emblems of aspiration and genius, recall[ing]his memory with a line of Greek verse copied from an antique tomb in Thebes."

The Concord community reached out to the grieving parents of Thomas Sanborn, who took up residence in the Emerson home and rented out their own from June to September.

"In Mother's room last night," Ellen Emerson wrote her sister Edith on November 20, 1890, "she spoke of her will, and of leaving something for the boy. I asked, 'Which one?' She said, 'The youngest, I suppose.' Then, after a while, she said, 'Do you think that beautiful boy that I fell so much in love with would like his share?' Just before she fell asleep she said, 'Do you think Mr. and Mrs. Sanborn will be pleased that the wonderful child has his rights?' "

== Legacy ==
The class of '86 and Harvard College lose a man whose life would have been devoted to letters, and whose genuine and versatile talent would hardly have failed to leave some mark in the world.

Remembered by his contemporaries as a tragic figure who held much literary promise, Thomas Parker Sanborn came to be linked with a group of other 1890s Harvard poets who died young, including Hugh McCulloch, Philip Henry Savage, Trumbull Stickney and George Cabot Lodge. Santayana published two obituaries for Sanborn, the first of which appeared in the Harvard Monthly Volume eight, Number One, March 1889. "The rare facility and delicacy of Mr. Sanborn's verses," Santayana wrote, "and his general literary aptitude, marked him out among his class-mates. His witty conversation, and much more the inward seriousness and idealism of his nature endeared him to those that knew him well. He was too sensitive and retiring to like general society, or to speak out his thoughts: he was more at ease with his pen. Mr. Sanborn had not only great felicity of style in his light verses, but he could put into them what is far more rare in the work of very young men,-- a true love of whatever is charming, beautiful and ideal. Yet with this idealism was joined a genuine and pathetic modesty. He was afraid he was wrong, he longed for recognition and external encouragement. This premature death is a calamity not to Mr. Sanborn's family and intimate friends alone. The class of '86 and Harvard College lose a man whose life would have been devoted to letters, and whose genuine and versatile talent would hardly have failed to leave some mark in the world."

In his 1943 memoirs, Santayana remembered Sanborn as "a poet of lyric and modest flights...His poems showed genuine feeling, not naturally in harmony with the over-intellectualized transcendentalism of Concord, Massachusetts, where his father was a conspicuous member of the Emersonian circle."

The protagonist in Santayana's novel The Last Puritan is said to be based in part on his college friend, Tom Sanborn.

I was born a moral aristocrat, able to obey only the voice of God, which means that of my own heart.... We will lie low, and dip under, until the flood has passed and wasted itself over our heads. We are not wanted. In the world to-day we are a belated phenomenon, like April snow. Perhaps it is time for us to die. If we resist, and try to cling to the fringes, as I have done so far, we are shaken off rudely, or allowed to hang on neglected and disowned. If we attempt to live apart, as my father did, we wither early into amiable ghosts.... We will not accept anything cheaper or cruder than our own conscience. We have dedicated ourselves to the truth, to living in the presence of the noblest things we can conceive. If we can't live so, we won't live at all.

== Writings ==
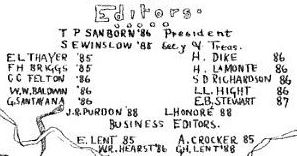
Harvard Lampoon masthead, 1886

Sanborn was an editor and regular contributor to the literary journals Harvard Monthly and Harvard Advocate and the humor magazine, the Harvard Lampoon. While on the staff of the Springfield Republican, his poetry and dramatic reviews were included without attribution. He also contributed to the magazines Puck and Life. In his biography of Henry Thoreau, Franklin Benjamin Sanborn included a portion of the poem "Endymion" by his son Thomas, who was seventeen at the time of its writing. The title of the poem refers to the myth of Endymion, a mortal who was so beautiful that the goddess of the moon fell in love with him and asked that he be given eternal youth; and so he was made to sleep a deathless sleep forever. Frank Sanborn placed the poem at the conclusion of the chapter of his book wherein Thoreau dies, suggesting the beautiful Henry Thoreau is immortal. From Endymion by Thomas Parker Sanborn:

O sister of the sun, draw near,
With softly-moving step and slow,
For dreaming not of earthly woe
Thou seest Endymion sleeping here!

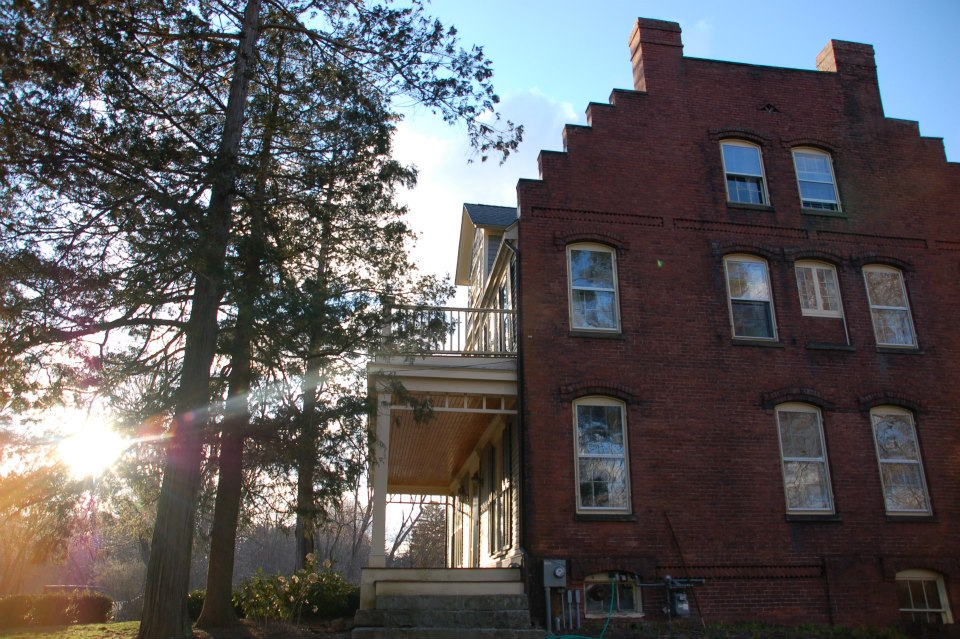
The Sanborn home in Concord, 2013

Also written when Thomas was seventeen, the poem Concord River was printed for the first time in The Springfield Republican three days after his death. In an article detailing the events of his funeral, Frank Sanborn stated Tom read the poem for Ralph Waldo Emerson. The following is an excerpt.

Or, last, when Winter binds the river bright
With hard and gleaming ice — a shift-forged chain,—
Even in that chill season 'tis delight
To roam across that broad and glittering plain,
Or skim its surface, as the short days wane,
Gliding along with swift and steel-bound feet:—
Truly the changes of the year are sweet.

== See also ==
- Franklin Benjamin Sanborn
- Victor Channing Sanborn
- The Harvard Monthly
