= Emily Wilder Leavitt =

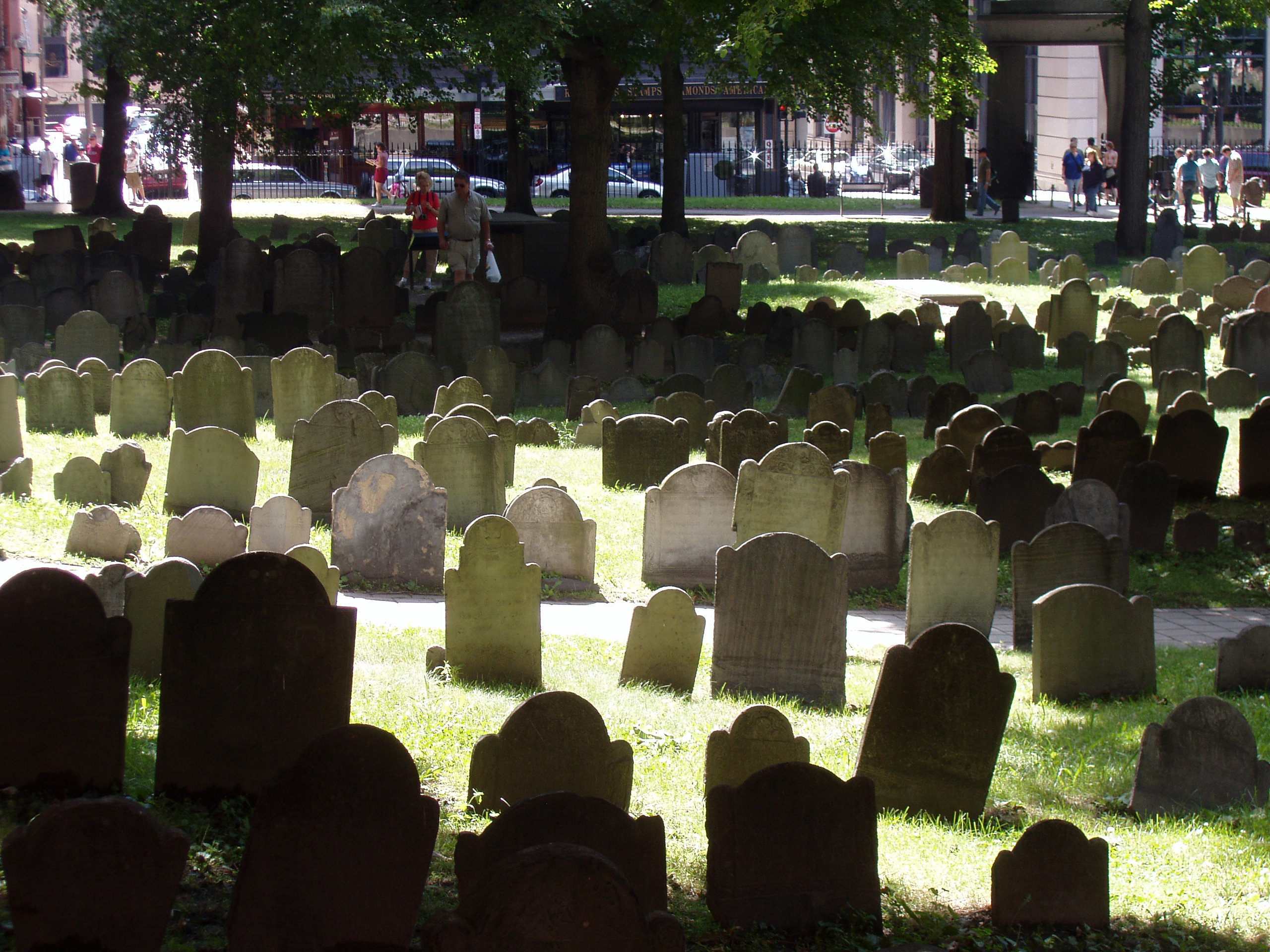
Old Granary Burying Ground, Boston, Massachusetts.

Emily Wilder Leavitt (1836–1921) of Boston, Massachusetts, was a historian and professional genealogist, and one of the first female members of the New England Historic Genealogical Society. Daughter of an acting mayor of Boston, Miss Leavitt managed to make a living writing the histories of early New England families, compelling her to scour the region's early records.

Emily Wilder Leavitt authored genealogies of many of New England's earliest families, including the Butlers, the Hamiltons (of North Yarmouth), the Blairs, the Dearings, the Starkeys, the Bogmans, the Bethunes, the Conants, the Warrens, the Cranes (of Milton, Massachusetts), the Moreys, the Brainerds (of Connecticut), the Palmers, Putnams, Faneuils, the Morses and many others.

Leavitt was born to an old New England family, the descendant of Thomas Leavitt, a farmer who initially settled at Exeter, New Hampshire, before moving on to Hampton, New Hampshire, where his descendants lived for generations. Miss Leavitt, who never married, was the daughter of Benson Leavitt, briefly acting mayor of Boston in 1845. Emily was born December 26, 1836, in Boston, where her father and mother, the former Abigail Ward, had settled.

In an era when women were largely barred from academia and the history profession, Leavitt was one of a number of women historians who turned to genealogy as a way of making a living — as well as indulging their passion for history. In the case of the Morse family, for instance, whose history Emily Leavitt helped Morse descendant J. Howard Morse write, the Boston genealogist had no Morse ancestors herself, but was paid for her research and provided guidance as an experienced researcher.

By the time the extensive Morse family genealogies were published in the late nineteenth century, during an explosion of interest by New Englanders in their ancestry, Leavitt was 67 years old and had authored or contributed to the history of many New England families. Leavitt frequently wrote her deep-pocketed employers from the confines of the New England Historic Genealogical Society, the nation's oldest, and the stationery on which she sent out her status reports bore the estimable Society's letterhead.

In the case of the Blair family, Leavitt wrote her history of the clan at the behest of Chicago businessman William McCormick Blair, founder of investment bankers William Blair & Company. For her Blair family research Leavitt contacted living descendants of Robert Blair and Isabella Rankin and collected family records from them.

A current search on Google, for instance — which would have left professional genealogists like Emily Leavitt dumbstruck — reveals volumes of research, much of which has withstood decades of scrutiny, attributed to women who turned to genealogy — dismissed by historians for years as a backwater — to indulge their love of history while still making a living. Many early family histories bore the hallmark 'privately printed' — read: vanity press — and extolled on their title pages a prestigious line of descent, preferably from a Puritan pillar like Governor John Winthrop, or some other New England potentate.

Typical of such volumes was that of the Palmer family, carrying the title John Melvin of Charlestown and Concord, Massachusetts, and His Descendants: Gathered and arranged for Mr. Lowell Mason Palmer by Miss Emily Wilder Leavitt. The tome was privately printed in Boston.

Sometimes researchers like Leavitt were obliged, especially if working outside their area of expertise, to run advertisements trolling for tidbits on the families they were paid to extol. In 1894, for instance, Emily Leavitt advertised in the Pennsylvania Magazine of History and Biography requesting specifics about the Abrams and Jones families who, according to Leavitt, "are supposed to have settled on the Welsh Tract near Radnor and Merion."

Even in those areas researchers knew best, they were often compelled to chum the genealogical magazines for clues to their clients' ancestry. In The Dedham Historical Register, published by the Dedham (Massachusetts) Historical Society, for example, Emily Wilder Leavitt ran this blurb in the 1892 issue under the heading of 'Queries': "What were the names of the parents of Hannah Baker, who married Elias Harding of Medway, Massachusetts? The marriage is recorded in the Town Records of Walpole, Mass., in 1795, while the Richard Baker genealogy gives the marriage of Hannah, daughter of Eleazer Baker of Walpole, to Amos Harding in 1785?"

Researchers like Leavitt occasionally felt compelled to braid their clients' ancestry with that of illustrious families, or to dispel family myths about poverty or bastardy, or to simply allow descendants to discern their origins. Genealogists like Leavitt balanced on the knife-edge of massaging their client's vanity while simultaneously hewing to historical verisimilitude. (It often took decades to discern whether they succeeded.)

Occasionally the efforts of these largely female genealogists were accorded mention by the national historical societies, which usually passed judgment only on the efforts of their scholarly male counterparts. Yet most work done by these early 'genealogists' was eerily similar to that done by their male 'historian' counterparts — including close examination of primary sources.

In Winchester Notes, for example, writer (and client) Fanny Winchester Hopkins noted that her researcher Leavitt had "examined church records, Maine wills, York deeds, etc.", to shed light on whether Winchester's ancestor "John Skillings (Thomas1) did not die until 1712-1714; that he removed with his family to Piscataqua; and that he may have gone to Portsmouth; that his widow and children went to Portsmouth; that his son Samuel returned to Falmouth; his son Josiah went to Kittery and died there; and that John and Elizabeth of Portsmouth, afterwards of Boston, in 1726, can readily have been the John, born in 1675-81, and so the father of John, Simeon and others of New North Church Records of Boston."

The methods of ascertaining answers to such questions were not far removed from those of historians like David McCullough — even if the detectives doing the work were dubbed 'genealogists.'

Emily Wilder Leavitt died November 2, 1921, in Boston. For much of her life she lived at 10 Joy Street on Boston's Beacon Hill. She was one of the first female members of the New England Historic Genealogical Society, to which she was admitted at age 62 in 1898, the first year the Society allowed women members.

== See also ==
- Benson Leavitt
