= Machine postmark =

Industrial standardised mail marking

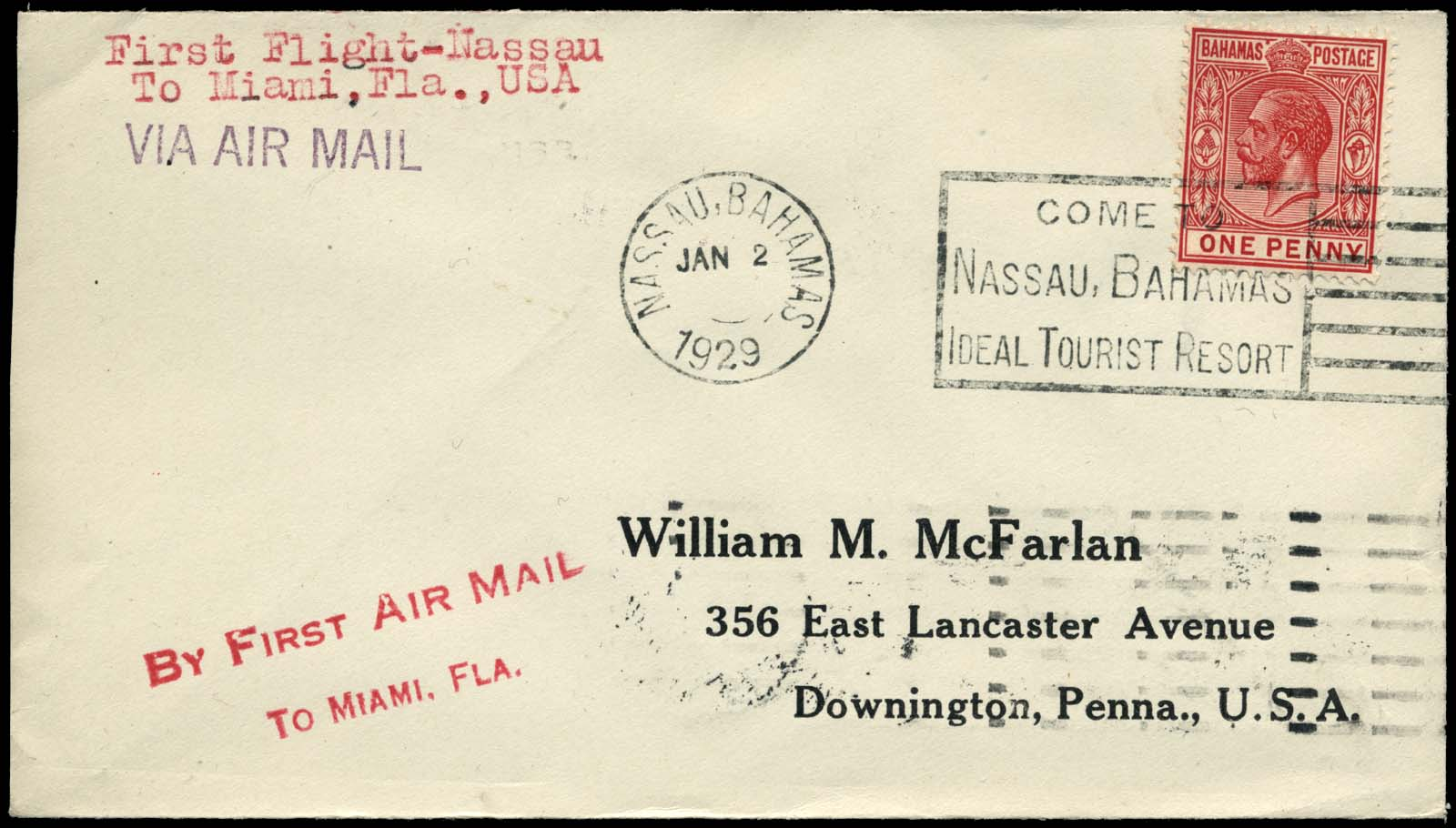
1929 machine cancellation used to cancel 1d stamp on first flight cover from Nassau to Miami

A machine postmark or machine cancellation is a postmark or cancellation on mail that is applied by a mechanical device rather than with the use of a handstamp. Nearly all machine-cancellation devices apply both postmark and cancellation simultaneously. While some mail is cancelled using handstamps, machine cancellation is ubiquitous, and in the industrialized nations the vast majority of mail is cancelled by machine.

== United States ==
In the United States, the first successful postmarking machine was developed by Thomas Leavitt in the 1870s, with covers known from 1876. By 1880 Leavitt machines were in use in twenty cities. Cancellations were of a variety of forms, including horizontal and diagonal lines, as well as "football" shapes. The American Postal Machines Company soon got into the business, with postmarks appearing from 1884, and became successful with a machine known for its speed of processing.

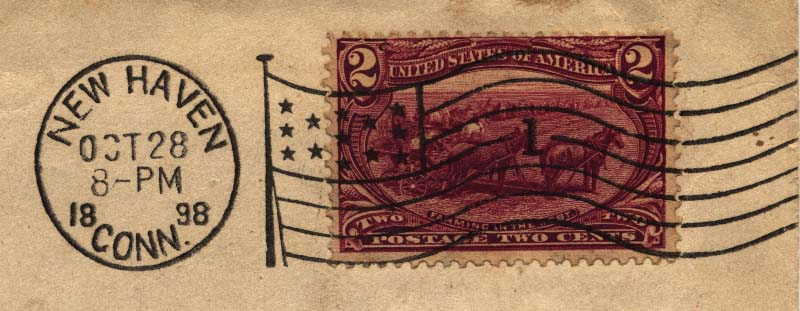
US flag cancel of 1898, on a 2c "Farming in the West" of the Trans-Mississippi issue of that year

APMC introduced the flag cancel in 1894, which used the wavy lines of the cancel to depict an approximate image of an American flag. During the 1890s dozens of other companies got into the business, although most were short-lived, and only about six, including Pitney-Bowes, lasted past the 1920s.

Slogan cancels also first appeared in the 1890s, initially to advertise the Pan-American Exposition in Buffalo, New York, gradually expanding to include a wide variety of uses. Slogans are commonplace today, with the US Postal Service still using them to promote special events, as well as to encourage better mailing practices (use of ZIP Code, proper addressing, etc.).
