= John Faunce Leavitt =

American artist (1905–1974)

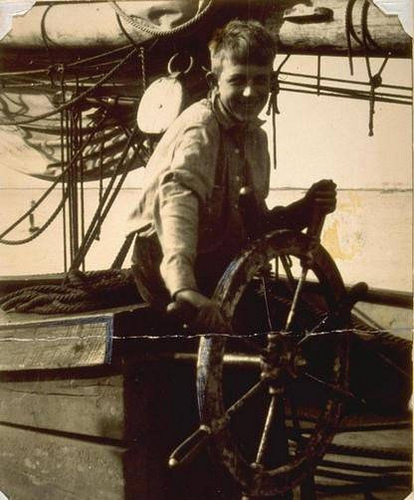
John F. Leavitt as a young man at the wheel of the coasting schooner Alice S. Wentworth

John Faunce Leavitt (1905–1974) was a well-known shipbuilder, writer on maritime subjects, painter of marine canvases, and curator of Mystic Seaport in Mystic, Connecticut.

John F. Leavitt was born to the sea. His Maine family were sailors, as reflected in early photographs showing his seven-year-old sister Syrena and him at the wheel of the Alice S. Wentworth in Lynn, Massachusetts. Leavitt himself was a crew member on several coastal schooners in Maine beginning in 1918 until about 1925, the tail end of the schooner era.

Later in life, the boatbuilder and artist began working for the esteemed Mystic Seaport museum, where he continued painting and writing about his love: the sea and the boats built to withstand it. At Mystic, Leavitt worked as an assistant curator, applying his knowledge of sailing vessels to the museum's collection.

He continued to paint and write, and his watercolor and oil paintings are in the collection of the Peabody Essex Museum, Salem, Massachusetts, and other museum and private collections. Leavitt painted everything from Old Ironsides to the Gloucester fishing schooner L. A. Dunton. In 1952 the maritime artist's works were the subject of a one-man show at the William A. Farnsworth Library and Art Museum, Rockland, Maine. Leavitt continued to write about the technical aspects of the shipbuilding industry, including the monograph Shipbuilding in Colonial Connecticut.

Leavitt's best-known work was Wake of the Coasters, published in 1970 by Wesleyan University Press. Drawing on his work for the Maritime Historical Association of Mystic, Connecticut, Leavitt sketched a biography of the smaller New England coasting schooners in a work now considered a classic among aficionados. On the opening page of his work, Leavitt's elegiac tone towards the noble wind-driven ships of the past was evident. "The dude cruisers are only maritime ghosts in an atomic world", Leavitt wrote wistfully of the old schooners.

In his works, both on canvas and paper, Leavitt's passion for the old schooners was palpable. "There was a time when spars and rigging made a commonplace pattern against the Maine sky", Leavitt wrote in Wake of the Coasters. "It was in 1938 when the last cargo-carrying schooner was launched in the State of Maine, yet today there seem to be very few who remember when the reaches and thoroughfares swarmed with coasting schooners. Perhaps that is because the sight was so taken for granted."

Leavitt's books were often the exception in the world of cool rigging-and-spars nautical writing. In Wake, for instance, Leavitt revisited the sinking of the 1928 sinking of the schooner William Booth by its much larger counterpart, the Helen Barnet Gring, an enormous four-masted coasting schooner built in 1919 by Robert L. Bean in Camden, Maine, for the Boston shipping firm of Crowell and Thurlow. The three-masted Booth, according to Leavitt, was cut down and sunk by the Gring. In Leavitt's hands, these arcane tales of the sea were rendered with the passion of Herman Melville.

Leavitt published a number of other books, most accompanied by his own artworks of the great coasting schooners. The Charles W. Morgan, published in 1973, delineated the history of the restored Morgan, the last wooden whaling ship, anchored at Mystic Seaport. The work included more than 80 photographs of the restored vessel, documenting the ship's crew at work on the vessel.

In an unblinking assessment of the hazards of sea travel, Leavitt noted the number of crew deaths aboard the schooner. "The late author John F. Leavitt chronicled the life of the vessel", wrote Leslie Rule in her Ghost in the Mirror, "referencing archived ship logs to provide much of the information, including many fatalities."

The papers of John Leavitt from 1966–74, during his time at Mystic as the Seaport's Associate Curator, are collected at the G. W. Blunt White Library at the Mystic Seaport Museum. The artist, writer and curator's photographs are in the collection of the George Eastman House in Rochester, New York. John Leavitt died on May 25, 1974, in Mystic, Connecticut.

== Fate of the Schooner John F. Leavitt ==
During the early 1970s a fan of the coasting schooners of New England, Ned Ackerman, became empassioned with a dream to build such a vessel, and to prove that commercial sail could still work. He had read all the books and talked with as many authorities as he could find. Among these was the master, John F. Leavitt. At the inaugural Schooner History Symposium held at the Bath Marine Museum in the summer of 1972, Mr. Leavitt and Mr. Ackerman were present. There were many living in Maine at the time who were tremendous experts in the history of the wooden schooners, and also there were many who owned these boats and were rebuilding them for use in the sail passenger trade. It was the perfect place to nurture an interest in the old working boats.

Ackerman had commissioned a design for the vessel from the renowned naval architect, Pete Culler, the author of Skiffs and Schooners. R. D. "Pete" Culler had designed several schooners of note for the Concordia Company in South Dartmouth, Massachusetts. He was also the designer of the sail training vessel R. Tucker Thompson of New Zealand.

Ackerman engaged to have this vessel built at Newbert & Wallace Shipyard in Thomaston, Maine. The keel was laid in 1976 of the 97-foot two-masted, centreboard schooner John F. Leavitt, named in honor of the author of Wake of the Coasters (1970). When finished she was painted white with a distinctive red waist, and her figurehead depicted a fox with feathers gripped in his mouth. The schooner was launched in late summer, 1979, and almost immediately began to encounter difficulties, running aground in the St. George River and having to sit out a tide on her launching day. She made her maiden voyage down the coast to Quincy, Massachusetts, in November. It was late in the season for a North Atlantic voyage, but here again she had to wait for her cargo. One of her best crew was injured climbing a fence and could not sail with her. Leaving Quincy heavily laden, she sank a few days later following a heavy winter three-day North Atlantic gale near the Gulf Stream. Her crew were taken off the vessel by the Air National Guard, by rescue helicopter.

The building and the eventual sinking of the John F. Leavitt was the subject of a film dubbed Coaster, some six years in the making. Critics gave the film glowing reviews, and it won the Best Adventure Film Feature at the American Film Festival. "A thrilling story", said The Boston Phoenix. "Endowed with the beauty of an heroic epic", raved The Washington Post. The schooner, carrying a cargo to Haiti on her maiden voyage, foundered in a gale off Delaware, an event captured on film.

Many in the schooner community, however, felt that throughout the sinking Ackerman was more concerned with saving face than saving his vessel. This view lead to a persistent joke at the time: (told with a Maine accent) "Called that boat the John F. Leave-It... and that's just what they did!."

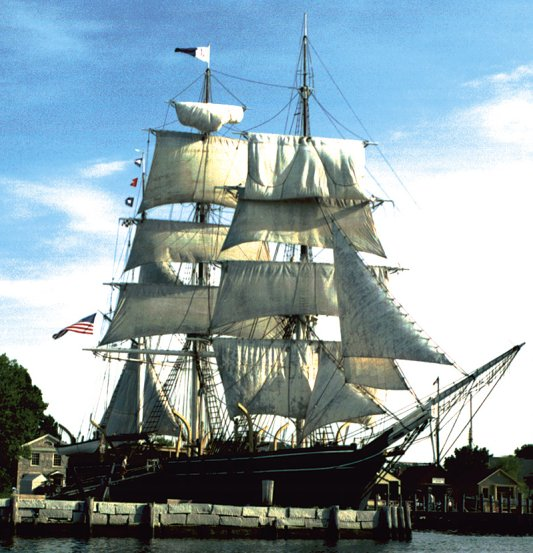
Charles W. Morgan, last wooden whaling ship, profiled by author and painter John F. Leavitt

The 83-ton schooner with 6,441 feet of sail, built by enthusiast Ned Ackerman and carrying a cargo of lumber, was seen to founder in heavy seas. Adding to the drama was that the John F. Leavitt was the first sailing cargo ship built for more than 40 years in the United States and went to her grave on her maiden voyage.

The ship was financed by a single enthusiast owner who was eager to demonstrate that wind power still had a place in the modern world. The topsail schooner was built to demonstrate that a modern wooden schooner under sail could carry cargo and compete with the engine-driven ships of the twentieth century.
