= Judith Walzer Leavitt =

American historian (born 1940)

Judith Walzer Leavitt (born July 22, 1940 in New York City) is an American historian.

Judith Walzer graduated in 1963 with a B.A. in social science from Antioch College. In July 1966 she married and assumed the name "Judith Walzer Leavitt". At the University of Chicago she graduated in history with an M.A. in 1966 and a Ph.D. in 1975.

She was the Rupple Bascom and Ruth Bleier Professor of History of Medicine, History of Science, and Women's Studies at the University of Wisconsin–Madison, retiring in 2010 as professor emerita. Her book subjects have included a study of Mary Mallon, a history of childbirth in America, and a history of public health in Milwaukee. She is married to Waisman Center medical director Lewis Leavitt, and is the sister of political theorist Michael Walzer. She and her husband have a daughter and a son.

She is a past president of the American Association for the History of Medicine, and an elected member of the American Academy of Arts and Sciences. Leavitt received her B.A. from Antioch College in 1963, and her M.A.T., M.A., and PhD in history from the University of Chicago in 1975.

== Published works ==
- Make Room for Daddy: The Journey from Waiting Room to Birthing Room (Chapel Hill: University of North Carolina Press, 2009). ISBN 978-0-8078-3255-4 book summary at University of North Carolina Press website
- Leavitt, J. W. (1998). ""Strange young women on errands". Obstetric nursing between two worlds". Nursing History Review. 6: 3–24. doi:10.1891/1062-8061.6.1.3. ISSN 1062-8061. PMID 9357294. S2CID 27207280.
- Leavitt, J.W., ed. (1999) [1984]. Women and Health in America: Historical Readings (Second revised ed.). Madison: University of Wisconsin Press. ISBN 0299159647.
- Leavitt, JW; Numbers, RL, eds. (1997). Sickness and Health in America: Readings in the History of Medicine and Public Health (Third ed.). Madison: University of Wisconsin Press. ISBN 0299153207.
- Kerber L; Kesslar-Harris A; Sklar K.K., eds. (1995). "Gendered expectations: Women and early twentieth century public health". U.S. History as Women's History: New Feminist Essays. Chapel Hill: University of North Carolina Press. ISBN 0-8078-2185-3.
- Typhoid Mary: Captive to the Public's Health, (Beacon Press, 1996); hbk ISBN 0807021024; Leavitt, Judith Walzer (July 31, 1997). 1997 pbk edition. Beacon Press. ISBN 0807021032.
- "A worrying profession: The domestic environment of medical practice in the mid-nineteenth century". Garrison Lecture, Bulletin of the History of Medicine, 1995;69: 1-29. JSTOR 44444505
- Brought to Bed: Childbearing in America 1750-1950, (Oxford University Press, 1986). Leavitt, Judith Walzer (2016). 30th anniversary edition. Oxford University Press. ISBN 978-0190264123.
- The Healthiest City : Milwaukee and the politics of health reform, (Princeton University Press, 1982). Leavitt, Judith W. (May 15, 1996). 1996 pbk edition. University of Wisconsin Press. ISBN 0-299-15164-6.
- Ronald L. Numbers and Judith Walzer Leavitt, eds. Wisconsin Medicine: Historical Perspectives (Madison, WI: University of Wisconsin Press, 1981). ISBN 0-299-08430-2; book details at University of Wisconsin Press website
- Leavitt, Judith Walzer (1980). "The Wasteland: Garbage and Sanitary Reform in the Nineteenth-Century American City". Journal of the History of Medicine and Allied Sciences. XXXV (4): 431–452. doi:10.1093/jhmas/XXXV.4.431. ISSN 0022-5045. PMID 7005319.
- Guenter B. Risse, Ronald L. Numbers, and Judith Walzer Leavitt, eds. Medicine without Doctors: Home Health Care in American History (New York: Science History Publications, 1977). ISBN 0882021656
