= Ashley Day Leavitt =

American Congregational minister

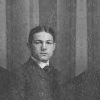
- 1900 Skull and Bones member
- Born: Ashley Day Leavitt; October 10, 1877; Chicago, Illinois
- Education: Yale University
- Known for: Congregational minister
- Title: Rev. Dr.
- Spouse: Myrtle Rose Hart of Barkhamsted, Connecticut
- Children: 2, including Hart Day Leavitt

Ashley Day Leavitt (1877–1959) was a Yale-educated Congregational minister who led the State Street Church in Portland, Maine, and later the Harvard Congregational Church in Brookline, Massachusetts. Leavitt was a frequent public speaker during the early twentieth century, and was awarded an honorary degree from Bowdoin College for his pastorship of several congregations during wartime.

== Early years ==
Ashley Leavitt's father was Burke Fay Leavitt. In 1868, Leavitt's father Burke was living in Melrose Highlands, Massachusetts and was a member of Phi Beta Kappa, an academic honor society. Burke subsequently became a minister for the United Church of Christ, and served as pastor of the denominations' first church in Maine at Williston in suburban Portland, Maine from 1872 to 1876.

Ashley Day Leavitt was born October 10, 1877, in Chicago, Illinois to Burke Fay and Lena (Day) Leavitt. Leavitt's name "Ashley" was taken from that of the maiden name of the wife of his ancestor Dr. Roswell Leavitt, a Massachusetts native and longtime physician in Cornish, New Hampshire who married Dorothy Ashley, a native of Deerfield, Massachusetts, in 1798 in Greenfield, Massachusetts. Leavitt's father went on to be pastor at the Town Church of Manchester, New Hampshire in 1893. From at least 1900 to 1909, his father was a minister of Melrose Highlands Congregational Church in Melrose, Massachusetts, and later took up a pastor's post in Lincoln Park in suburban Chicago.

Leavitt himself was educated at Cambridge Rindge and Latin School in Cambridge, Massachusetts, and then at Yale College. In 1900, Leavitt was a member of Skull and Bones, an elite secret society based at Yale University, in New Haven, Connecticut. He also was on the Yale debating team. From Yale, Leavitt attended Hartford Theological Seminary.

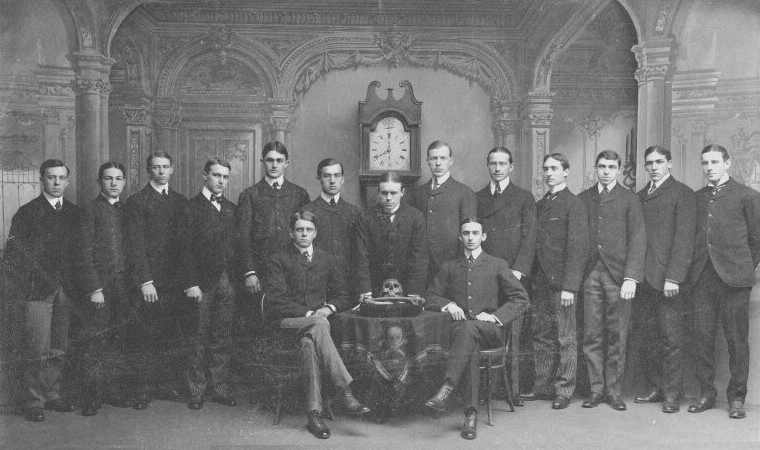
Skull and Bones members in 1900 with Leavitt standing second from the left

Leavitt's first ministerial job was as assistant pastor of South Church in Hartford, Connecticut, then subsequently at Congregational churches in Willimantic, Connecticut, Concord, New Hampshire and at Portland, Maine. In June 1903, Leavitt gave a speech at the Yale alumni meeting and Medical School anniversary exercise. On September 7, 1904, Leavitt married Myrtle Rose Hart of Barkhamsted, Connecticut. They had two children: Hart Day Leavitt, a longtime professor of English at Phillips Academy in Andover, Massachusetts; and Julia Leavitt, born at Cumberland, Maine, in 1915. While at Portland, Maine, Leavitt was honored with giving the 1905 undergraduate commencement speech at the University of Connecticut, where he spoke on "The Individual, Law and Liberty."

== World War I ==
Leavitt enlisted and served in YMCA camps at home and abroad during World War I. The YMCA's own World War I efforts were memorialized in Yip Yip Yaphank, a Broadway musical developed in 1917 by Irving Berlin to include a song entitled "I Can Always Find a Little Sunshine in the Y.M.C.A."

At the height of World War I in 1918, Leavitt was the Pastor of the State Street Congregational Church in Portland. In awarding Leavitt a Doctor of Divinity (D.D.) honorary degree that same year, Bowdoin College noted that Leavitt "at all times an eloquent preacher of Christian duty, and in wartime a convincing teacher of the principle that only the righteous nation that keepeth truth may enter in the gates of the Kingdom."

In 1921, Leavitt was serving in a two-year position on the Congregational Educational Foundation. In June 1925, he conducted the services in Appleton Chapel at Harvard University. Rev. Leavitt also frequently spoke at the graduation exercises of nearby Radcliffe College.

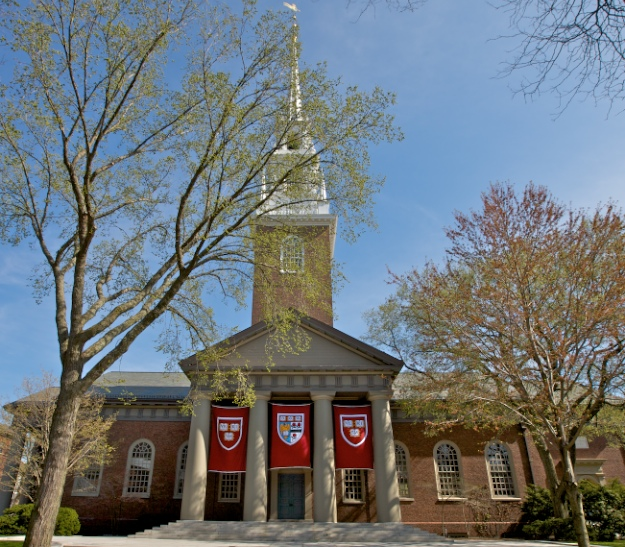
Harvard Church, Harvard University. Rev. Ashley Day Leavitt of Harvard Congregational Church in nearby Brookline often led worship at Appleton Chapel and Harvard Memorial Church which replaced it.

In 1927, Leavitt was the pastor at Harvard Church. In December of that year, he attended the Centennial of the Boston Seaman's Friend Society and spoke about the predecessors to the society,

But this Society was the successor of another organization which was called 'The Society for the Moral and Religious Improvement of the Poor'. That is the kind of thing they were doing one hundred years ago. This Society for the Moral and Religious Improvement of the Poor was the successor of another Society for the Moral and Religious Instruction of the Seaman. Fancy trying to do business in such an organization today! But that is what they had in a great deal of their religion a hundred years ago - a kind of condescension. The people that were capable the people that were fortunate, went out in pity to do work for the unfortunate, and they expected a certain subserviency and obeisance on the part of those who were the recipients of the benefaction. A finer democracy has come now ... No Christian today thinks of going out to elevate his fellow man.

In November 1928, Swami Yogananda spoke to the Harvard Congregational Church during Leavitt's tenure, and Leavitt later wrote to the Swami thanking him for the speech: "Best of all was the background of fine understanding which made all feel in the same human brotherhood with you."

Prior to 1941, Leavitt was a frequent speaker at Phillips Academy, the same University preparatory school in Andover where his son Hart, a graduate of Andover's rival Phillips Exeter Academy, had become a professor. In 1948, Leavitt spoke at Union Chapel at Little Boar's Head, New Hampshire.

== Selected publications ==
- Leavitt, Ashley Day (1914). Of First Importance: A Sermon Preached at State St. Congregational Church, Portland, Maine, April 26, 1914. s.n.
- Leavitt, Ashley Day (1917). The Present Crisis: A Sermon. State Street Congregational Church.
- Leavitt, Ashley Day (1925). Jesus and the Jury: A Living Faith for Living Men. The Pilgrim Press.
- Leavitt, Ashley Day (1938). Just a Moment: Briefest Comments on Religion and Life. W.A. Wilde.
- Leavitt, Ashley Day. Furnished Lives.

== See also ==
- Hart Day Leavitt
