= Western Reserve College =

Western Reserve College may refer to either of two successor educational institutions from the Western Reserve College and Preparatory School in Hudson, Ohio:

- Western Reserve Academy, a private, mid-sized, coeducational boarding and day college preparatory school located in Hudson, Ohio, United States
- Case Western Reserve University, a private research university in Cleveland, Ohio, United States, which became Western Reserve University upon moving from Hudson, Ohio, to Cleveland in 1882 and later merged with the Case Institute of Technology in 1967
