= Lewis Leavitt =

American physician

Lewis A. Leavitt is medical director of the Waisman Center on Human Development at the University of Wisconsin–Madison and Professor of Pediatrics at the University of Wisconsin School of Medicine. Leavitt graduated from the University of Chicago School of Medicine and is the husband of medical historian Judith Walzer Leavitt.

As a clinician evaluating young children who have developmental disabilities, Leavitt has been active in efforts to translate research into clinical practice. He has worked extensively with parent groups for public education regarding developmental disability issues. At the Waisman Center, Leavitt directs an interdisciplinary training program for pre- and post-doctoral physicians, nurses and allied health professionals working in the field of developmental disabilities. Currently, his research efforts include studying coping mechanisms used by parents who have adolescents and adults with autism.

His research for many years has focused on the development of communication between parents and their infants or young children. His work has used physiological measures, such as heart rate, skin conductance, and non-nutritive sucking, as well as behavioral observation. His early work investigated infant speech perception and the impact of prematurity on infant development. His current work investigates the role of maternal sensitivity to infant signals in the development of mother-infant communication and behavioral interaction. A primary focus of this work is the implication of early parent-child interaction in determining trajectories of child development for both typically and atypically developing children.

Leavitt is an important figure in the research field of infant development and parent-infant interaction. He has written extensively on how parents can help their children understand trauma.

Leavitt is the author of a booklet, "When Terrible Things Happen: A Parent's Guide to Talking with Their Children," sponsored by the American Academy of Pediatrics, the International Pediatric Association and the Johnson and Johnson Pediatric Institute.

== Education ==
Leavitt received an M.D. from the University of Chicago School of Medicine in 1965. From 1965 to 1968, he was a pediatrics resident at the Bronx Municipal Hospital Center in New York. Leavitt completed his postdoctoral fellowship in psychophysiology at the University of Wisconsin–Madison in 1972.

== Employment ==
From 1968 to 1970, he served as a staff physician at St. Albans Naval Hospital in New York.

In 1972, he began working as a professor of pediatrics and head, Infant Processes Section at the Waisman Center on Mental Retardation and Human Development at the University of Wisconsin–Madison. In 1987, he became the director of developmental pediatrics at the school's Department of Pediatrics; in 1989, he became the medical director of the Waisman Center's Clinical Services Unit.

== Professional activities ==
- 1974–1976 Ethics Committee, Society for Psychophysiological Research
- 1977–1979 Interdisciplinary Committee, Society for Research in Child Development
- 1978–1980 Infant Development and Behavior Editorial Board
- 1983–1989 Publications Board, Society for Research in Child Development
- 1989–1990 Fogarty International Fellowships
- 1990–1992 Chairman, Interdisciplinary Affairs Committee, Society for Research in Child Development
- 1990–1996 Executive Board of International Society for Infant Studies
- 1992–1993 Chairman, President's Task Force, Integrative Perspectives and New Directions, Society for Research in Child Development.
- 1992–1994 Child Development Editorial Board
- 1992–1998 American Journal of Mental Retardation Editorial Board
- 1998–1999 Member DHSS, DRG Study Section on Human Development HUD-1
- 1999–2003 American Academy of Pediatrics Task Force on Children and Disasters
- 1999–present Medical School Admissions Committee
- 2000–present Parenting Science and Practice
- 2000–present Infants and Young Children

== Recent publications ==
- Shahinfar, A., Fox, N.A., and Leavitt, L.A. (2000). Preschool Children's Exposure to Violence: Relation of Behavior Problems to Parent and Child Reports. American Journal of Orthopsychiatry 7 0 (1), 115–125.
- Donovan, W.D., Leavitt, L.A., and Walsh, R.O. (2000). Maternal Illusory Control Predicts Socialization Strategies and Toddler Compliance. Developmental Psychology. 36 (3) 402-411.
- Raviv, A., Erel, O., Fox, N.A., Leavitt, L.A., Raviv, A., Dar, I., Shahinfar, A., & Greenbaum, C. (2001). Individual measurement of exposure to everyday violence among elementary school children across various settings. Journal of Community Psychology, 29 (2), 117–140.
- Stein, B.D., Zima, B., Elliott, M.N., Burnam, A., Shahinfar, A., Fox, N.A., & Leavitt, L.A. ( 2001). Violence exposure among school-aged children in foster care Relation to distress symptoms. Journal of the American Academy of Child and Adolescent Psychiatry 40 (5): 588-594.
- Leavitt, L.A., (2002) When terrible things happen: a parent's guide to talking with their children. [Journal Article] Journal of Pediatric Health Care 16(5): 272-4.
- Leavitt, J.W. and Leavitt, L.A. (2003) Dissent, Fall issue, 54–58.
- Cole, C.F., Arafat, C., Tidhar, C., Tafesh, W.Z., Fox, N.A., Killen, M., Ardila-Rey, A., Leavitt, L.A., Lesser, G., Richman, B.A., and Yung, F. (2003). A Sesame Street television series to promote respect and understanding among children living in Israel, the West Bank and Gaza. International Journal of Behavioral Development 27(5), 409–422.
