= Benson Leavitt =

American politician

Acting Mayor of Boston
- In office November 22, 1845 – December 11, 1845
- Preceded by: Thomas Aspinwall Davis
- Succeeded by: Josiah Quincy Jr.

Chairman of the Boston Board of Aldermen

Member of the Boston Board of Aldermen

Member of the Massachusetts House of Representatives for Suffolk County
- In office January 4, 1843 – January 1845

Personal details
- Born: June 21, 1797 Hampton Falls, New Hampshire
- Died: June 1, 1869 (aged 71) Watertown, Massachusetts
- Party: Whig
- Spouse: Abigail Ward
- Children: Emily Wilder Leavitt

Benson Leavitt (21 June 1797–1 June 1869) was a Boston, Massachusetts, businessman, born in New Hampshire, who served as an Alderman of Boston, and later as acting mayor after the incumbent became incapacitated and died while in office.

Benson Leavitt was born at Hampton Falls, New Hampshire, on June 21, 1797, the son of land surveyor Thomas and his wife Hannah (Melcher) Leavitt. Thomas Leavitt helped establish the Democratic party in New Hampshire, and helped lay out some towns in the northern part of the state. Later, under President Andrew Jackson, the Democratic party came to control Hampton Falls, and Thomas Leavitt was chosen Town Clerk.

In 1814, when Thomas Leavitt's son Benson was 17 years old, the future mayor served with 40 men from Hampton Falls who marched to Portsmouth, New Hampshire, then under threat of attack by British forces during the War of 1812. Benson Leavitt later married Abigail Ward, born at Hampton Falls in 1801, daughter of Capt. Thomas and Abigail (Garland) Ward.

Benson Leavitt and his wife subsequently removed to Boston, where he was a merchant, often trading with other merchants in New Hampshire and where he was elected an Alderman. Leavitt operated Leavitt & Company, fish traders, at a warehouse at Boston's Philadelphia Packet Pier.

Leavitt also served as a director of the Granite Bank, a founder of the Fishing Insurance Company and for several years was a Representative to the Massachusetts General Court from Suffolk County, where he was a member of the Joint Committee on Fisheries. Leavitt also served on the Boston School Committee for many years.

Leavitt later served as chairman of the Board of Aldermen and – briefly – as Acting Mayor of the city after Mayor Thomas Aspinwall Davis became ill and died while in office.

On October 1, 1845, Mayor Thomas Aspinwall Davis wrote Board of Aldermen chairman Benson Leavitt from his home in Brookline. "Believing that time and care would restore my strength", Davis wrote, "I persevered in the hope that I might complete the term for which I was elected. But Providence has seen fit to order otherwise, and I find myself now, by great prostration of strength, quite unfit for service of any kind, either public or private. Under these circumstances it is a duty which I owe to the City as well as myself, to resign the office of Mayor."

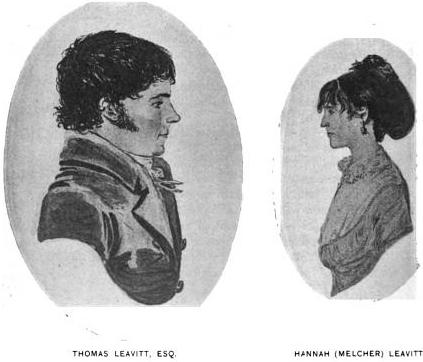
Thomas Leavitt and wife Hannah, parents of Benson Leavitt

But despite Davis's offer to resign, Boston City Council rejected the resignation, and the mayor was forced to remain in office until his death on November 22, 1845. Benson Leavitt was subsequently named acting mayor.

Benson Leavitt was the uncle of author and reformer Franklin B. Sanborn, who recalled visiting his uncle Benson at his home across the street from Rev. Dr. Edward Beecher's home in Boston's North End. (Rev. Beecher and Benson Leavitt frequently served on boards together, including that of the Boston School Committee). On the visit, Sanborn made the acquaintance of Beecher's sister Harriet Beecher Stowe, who was "fresh from her success in Uncle Tom's Cabin".

Leavitt served as acting mayor of Boston, Massachusetts from November 22, 1845 to December 11, 1845. He was succeeded by Mayor Josiah Quincy Jr., who occupied the Mayor's office from December 11, 1845, until January 1849. Benson Leavitt died at Watertown, Massachusetts, on June 1, 1869. He was survived by a daughter Emily Wilder Leavitt, a professional genealogist.

== See also ==
- Emily Wilder Leavitt
- Franklin Benjamin Sanborn

Preceded by Thomas Aspinwall Davis	Mayor of Boston, Massachusetts (acting); November 22, 1845 – December 11, 1845	Succeeded by Josiah Quincy Jr.
