= Ralph Leavitt =

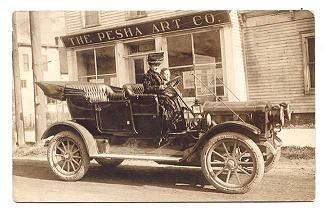
Steam automobile. Ralph Leavitt's customer traded his steam automobile for a new model, which promptly broke down. He had dealer Leavitt arrested, who fled to his Maine home

Ralph J. Leavitt (born 1877, date of death unknown) was an early New York City automobile dealer charged with fraud who successfully avoided arrest over a period of months, both in New York City and in his native York Harbor, Maine, where he fled, and where he tied his speedboat to a buoy, threatening officers with a pistol. Leavitt's flight from justice was chronicled in the newspapers of the day.

Leavitt set off the mad dash after jumping bail in 1905 in Manhattan, where he was charged with fraud in connection with a trade-in at his Manhattan car dealership, the Leavitt Motor Power Exchange. In a chase-scene reported blow-by-blow in The New York Times, Leavitt was said to have barely escaped capture in New York, and then fled northward to Maine.

Surprised by detectives at his Maine home, Leavitt took to his boat in York Harbor, "defying officers and threatening to shoot the first man who dared to molest him," after which "he came ashore and disappeared," The New York Times reported. Earlier Leavitt had moored to a buoy, "prepared to keep away all hostile persons by use of his revolver."

In an era before cable news networks, the hijinks of the New York car dealer kept a nation riveted. A day after The New York Times informed its readers that the scofflaw Leavitt had taken to his launch to evade arrest, The Times announced in a front-page headline: "HOW LEAVITT HELD OUT AGAINST ALL COMERS." In smaller serif print, the newspaper of record noted that "Armed in His Launch, He Defied Beardsley and His Sleuths." ("EVEN THE SHERIFF DAUNTED" was the subhead.) And below that the Times noted that the "Auto Dealer Raised Such Serious Objections to Arrest That Detectives Returned to This City.")

The wily auto dealer, according to The Times, had outwitted even Hubert T.E. Beardsley of the American Bonding Company. "The next time he goes in pursuit of Ralph J. Leavitt," said the Times of Beardsley, "he will take a squadron of cavalry if the chase is by land, or a torpedo boat, if the seas or other bodies of water have to be traversed."

Beardsley's adventure, according to The Times, began when Toledo, Ohio-bound New York real estate mogul Robert G. Kelsey picked up a car from Leavitt's dealership. The automobile "fell to pieces as soon as it was on the road," and Kelsey, learning that Leavitt had already sold the steam-driven model he'd traded in, had Leavitt arrested. Ralph Leavitt subsequently made bail, was released, and fled to his old Maine haunts, whereupon bondsman Beardsley set off for Maine in hot pursuit, along with four other detectives.

Arriving in York Harbor, Maine, Beardsley and his detectives asked directions to the Leavitt homestead in York Corners, some seven miles inland. On arriving at the Leavitt home, the bondsman reminded auto dealer Leavitt that he was a fugitive, and asked Leavitt to come quietly. "Leavitt laughed long and loud," according to The New York Times, saying that "no one in the present company could put handcuffs on him. Leavitt took down from the mantel a revolver, and repeated that he didn't think that anyone present wanted to handcuff him."

The New York detective tried a different approach. "Mr. Beardsley tried tact, artifice and diplomacy", said The Times. "Mr. Leavitt softened. He laid aside his resolve and invited his visitors to have a bite to eat while he went upstairs to prepare himself for the journey to New York." Minutes passed, and when the New York detectives went upstairs to locate Leavitt, they discovered the car dealer had fled, taking to his yacht. Beardsley and the detectives followed. When they put in at the harbor, a bullet whizzed by their heads from the direction of Leavitt's Haidee speedboat, "the swiftest craft in any water thereabouts."

Facing defeat, the New York City detectives rang up Sheriff Athorne of York County, who motored out to Leavitt on his dory. The fugitive Leavitt told the sheriff that some New Yorkers were trying to kidnap him, and that if they tried again he would shoot them. Hearing this, bail bondsman Beardsley chartered a tugboat from Portsmouth, New Hampshire, "with which to take up the chase again," reported The New York Times. "The Portsmouth tug owner, however, did not enthuse over the proposition," said The Times," and, as there were no armored motor boats in the neighborhood and not a torpedo boat nearer than Newport, Mr. Beardsley and the detectives came back to New York."

In the environs of York Harbor, noted The Times, the New Yorkers may have shown good judgment as "Leavitt has a reputation of being a crack shot with a revolver." Moreover, the fugitive Mainer was said by The Times to have been well fortified for the encounter. "Leavitt's boat is well stocked," reported The Times, "and he intends to remain on board indefinitely, or to put to sea if the New York deputies decide to pursue him again."

Ultimately, as far as is known, Leavitt came ashore at his Maine home and never returned to New York City. The early automotive dealer did, however, later race cars in Santa Monica, California.
