= Caroline Kirkland =

American writer

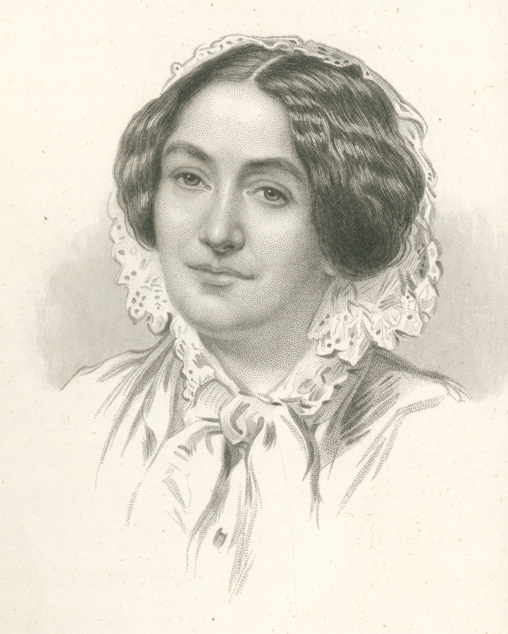
Caroline Mathilda Kirkland

Caroline Mathilda Stansbury Kirkland (January 11, 1801 – April 6, 1864) was an American writer.

== Biography ==
She was born into a middle-class family in New York City, the oldest of eleven children. Her mother was a writer of fiction and poetry. Her father died when she was 21 and the family followed her to upstate New York, where she taught and had met her future husband, William Kirkland. The death of her father had made her mainly responsible for the rest of the family. She married William in 1828 and they settled in Geneva, New York, where they founded the Domestic school. They had five children (one of whom died) before they left Geneva.

In 1835 the Kirklands moved to the then frontier town of Detroit, Michigan, and in 1837 they founded the village of Pinckney on land that William had purchased. It was there that Caroline had success with her first book, A New Home; Who'll Follow. She wrote another book about life in the settlements, Forest Life, while still in Michigan. The Kirklands left Michigan in 1843 because their venture to establish the town of Pinckney was not a financial success, and because they felt shut out by the reactions of their neighbors to Kirkland's frank revelations of frontier life. A third book based on frontier life, Western Clearings, came out in 1845, after she had returned with her family to New York City.

In New York William Kirkland entered the newspaper business as editor of the New York Evening Mirror, and of his own paper, the Christian Inquirer. In 1846 an accident resulted in his death. Mrs. Kirkland continued her literary activities until her own death in 1864. Their son Joseph Kirkland, who was born in Geneva, also became a recognized writer.

On returning to New York, Mrs. Kirkland opened a school for girls and from 1847 to 1849 was editor of the Union Magazine. She also entered into the literary social life of the community often entertaining writers, publishers, and other notables. Her home served as a literary salon and hosted notables including Edgar Allan Poe, William Cullen Bryant, Elizabeth Drew Stoddard, and others. Mrs. Kirkland went abroad in 1848 and again in 1850. She was received by Charles Dickens and the Brownings, Elizabeth Barrett Browning and Robert Browning. She also became a close friend and correspondent of Harriet Martineau.

Kirkland had considerable fame and accolades from her writings during her lifetime. Poe in particular thought of her as a significant American writer. She was a relatively early American woman writer who appears to have written because she liked to write and only published what she considered to be well written. She wrote for men as well as women but definitely wrote from a female perspective. Her works continue to be studied in relation to style, contributions to American literature and the influence of the female perspective.

== Works ==
A New Home—Who'll Follow?, published under the pseudonym Mary Clavers, is a tale of the frontierswoman, important for its realism and celebration of the traditional female perspective. Kirkland also wrote the book "Forest Life", which is the sequel to "A New Home-Who'll Follow?". She has also written another book called "Western Clearings" and various essays.
