= Hart Day Leavitt =

American educator and author (1909–2008)

- Born: December 29, 1909; Concord, New Hampshire, U.S.
- Died: October 10, 2008 (aged 98); North Andover, Massachusetts, U.S.
- Occupations: Educator; author; musician
- Parent: Ashley Day Leavitt (father)

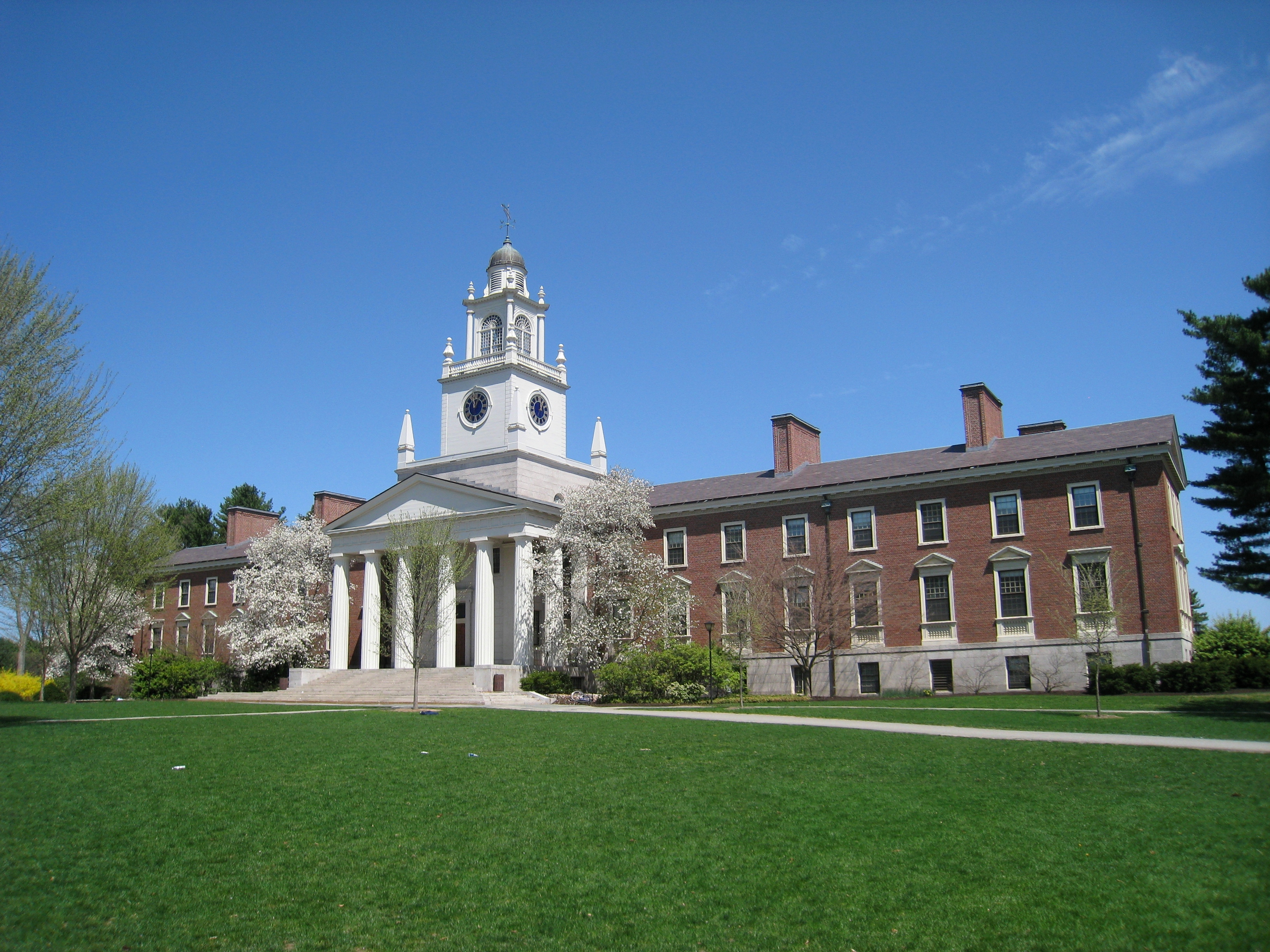
Samuel Phillips Hall at Phillips Academy

Hart Day Leavitt (December 29, 1909 – October 10, 2008) was a longtime English teacher at Phillips Andover Academy, amateur jazz musician, the author of a bestselling book on grammar and writing, and the professor of many notable Andover graduates, including Jack Lemmon, Buzz Bissinger and President George H. W. Bush.

== Early life ==
Leavitt was born December 29, 1909 in Concord, New Hampshire, where his father, Congregational minister Ashley Day Leavitt, was pastor of a church. Leavitt's mother was Myrtle (Hart) Leavitt, from whom he derived his first name.

He attended Phillips Exeter Academy, and subsequently graduated from Yale University, his father's alma mater, in 1934. Following his Yale graduation, Leavitt studied at the Bread Loaf school at Middlebury College.

== Career ==
After graduation, Leavitt took a $22-a-week job as a cub reporter on a New Hampshire newspaper. During his time as a reporter, the mother of Leavitt's fiancée suggested that he read And Gladly Teach, a book by Perry Bliss, brother of Phillips Exeter's principal. The book so captivated Leavitt that he immediately presented himself at the office of the Exeter principal, where he asked for a job. But with no graduate degrees, he was rejected.

Leavitt next turned to the competition: Phillips Andover in Andover, Massachusetts, where headmaster Claude M. Fuess was intrigued by the thought of hiring a graduate of his archrival. "I was a bit disappointed not to go back to my old school", Leavitt said years later, "but not for long". Leavitt joined the Massachusetts preparatory school's English department, where he taught for nearly 40 years.

During his time at Andover, Leavitt authored three books about creative writing, including Stop, Look, and Write, which became a bestseller with over a million copies in print. He also indulged his first love, jazz, by playing sax and clarinet in several jazz ensembles. At age 14 Leavitt received a saxophone from his father, and he played through Exeter and Yale, and at one time considered a career as a musician. "At one point", the teacher recalled, "I thought I'd make jazz my profession".

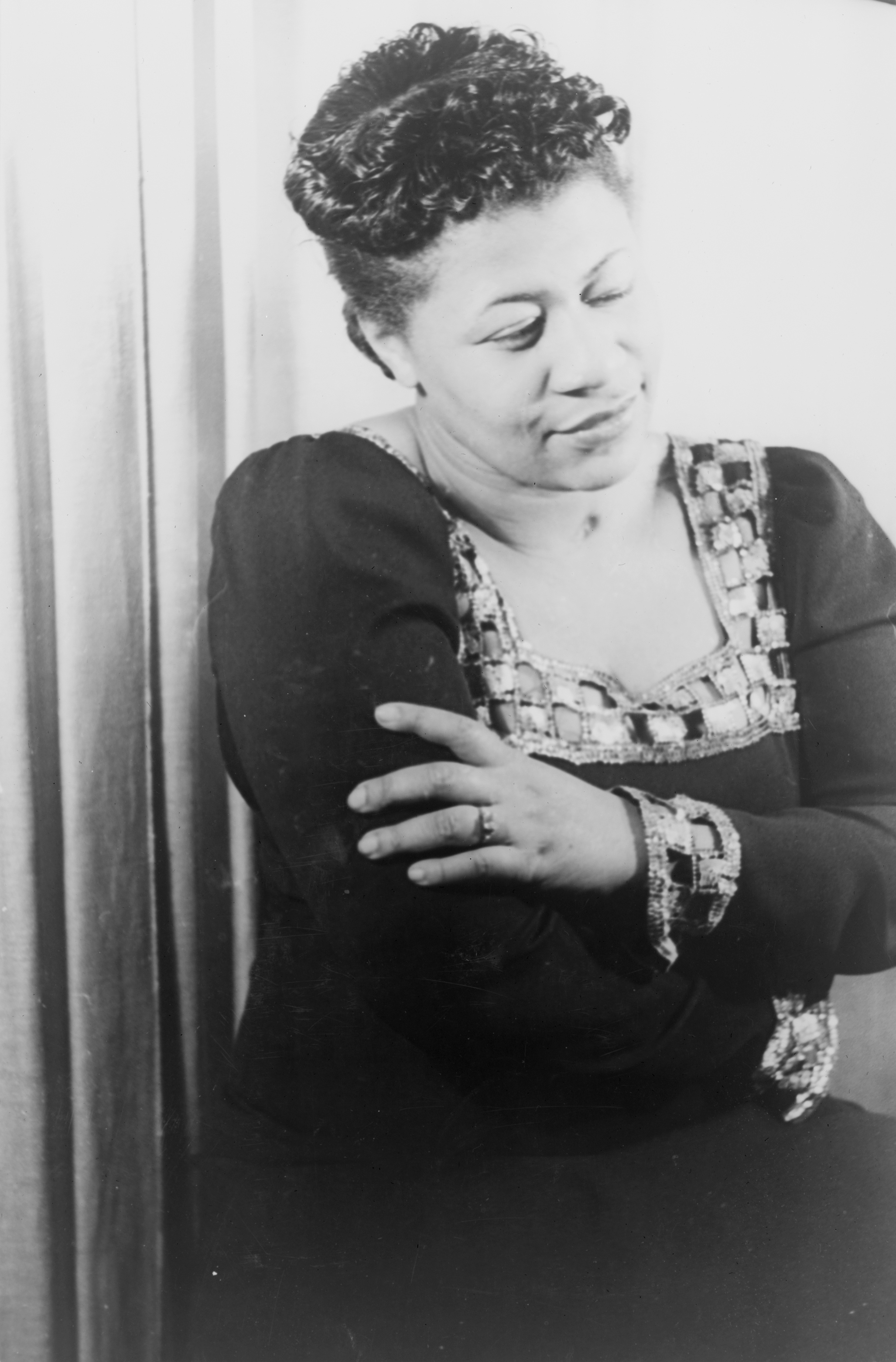
Ella Fitzgerald in 1940, one of jazz enthusiast Hart Leavitt's favorite performers

But when Leavitt joined the Andover faculty, jazz was somewhat outré. "Back in the 1940s the school was run by old conservatives, most of whom thought jazz was evil music", Leavitt later told musician and Andover graduate Thomas Chapin, recalling an invitation by some of his students to play with their band. "So I decided to go in and ask the headmaster who hired me if it would be all right to perform with the boys and their band. The boss looked at me disapprovingly. 'Well, Hart if you want to do that kind of thing!' So I had to refuse."

In his faculty role on the Andover campus, Leavitt wore several hats, including five years coaching the varsity hockey team (1945–1950). The team normally played on Rabbit Pond as an ice hockey rink had not yet been built. Following his stint as a coach, Leavitt switched gears, and embracing his love of carpentry and theater, headed up the stage crew at the old George Washington Hall theater. In his one on-stage performance, the English teacher appeared as one of the gangsters in Kiss Me, Kate, crooning "Brush Up Your Shakespeare" in a thick gangster accent.

Leavitt often joked with colleagues about his education at rival Exeter. A handful of other Andover faculty were also Exeter graduates, and the group referred to themselves as "the red cell" among the blue. (Exeter's school colors are maroon and white; Andover's blue and white.) "For this teenager it all began," said Andover alum and fellow teacher of English Thomas Regan, "with the mystery of how an Exonian could develop such lifelong loyalty to Andover."

Former President George H. W. Bush told Time magazine in an interview that he recalled writing several book reviews for Leavitt's English class, including one for Moby Dick. Bush received a grade of 67 in the class. (A grade of 60 was a failing grade). About his former student Leavitt was circumspect, recalling that "his grades in my course were not very good. He was in my eleventh-grade English class, but my remaining impression is that he just sat in the class and handed in his papers." Leavitt recalled having "very little respect for George's mentality." But, Leavitt allowed, "I have to go back and say that when he was in my class maybe he was an underdeveloped young man like a lot of them."

"He showed no imagination or originality", Leavitt told Time, although he added that Bush was pleasant and had good manners. Leavitt also taught George's brother, Prescott Bush Jr., and noted that the Bush brothers' Senator father was too self-possessed to engage in small talk.

Nearing the end of his Andover career, a former student recalled Leavitt as "on the verge of retirement and still playing regular saxophone gigs with a big band." Following his retirement from Phillips Andover at age 65, Leavitt was appointed to the faculty of Harvard University, where he taught expository writing to freshmen for five years. At the end of his Harvard stint, and again facing retirement, Leavitt got himself appointed to a job teaching English at Tufts University.

Leavitt was married to Carol for 63 years. Among their shared interests were music – she loved classical, and he loved jazz. His wife encouraged Leavitt to take up the clarinet, and he dragged her to smoky jazz clubs to listen to his favorite jazz artists, including Ella Fitzgerald. Together they were instrumental in bringing the Andover Chamber Music Series to the town.

Hart Day Leavitt died October 10, 2008, in North Andover, Massachusetts. A memorial service was held at Kemper Auditorium at Phillips Andover on November 15.

== See also ==
- Ashley Day Leavitt
