= Joseph Kirkland =

American novelist

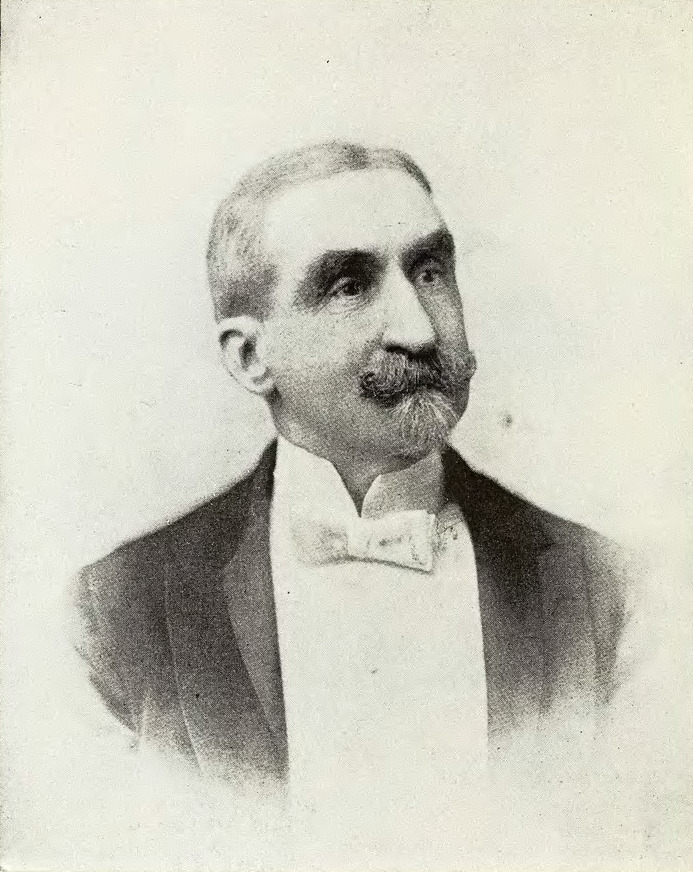
- Born: 7 January 1830; Geneva
- Died: 29 April 1894; Chicago
- Occupation: Writer
- Mother: Caroline Kirkland

Joseph Kirkland (January 7, 1830 - April 29, 1894) was an American novelist. Born in Geneva, New York, to educator William Kirkland and author Caroline Kirkland, he was a businessman in Chicago, then served in the Union Army during the Civil War, reaching the rank of major. He resigned his Union Army commission and moved to Tilton, Illinois, where he married Theodosia B. Wilkinson in 1863. In 1864 he founded the Midwestern literary periodical Prairie Chicken. After the war he became a lawyer while also pursuing writing. He is best remembered as the author of two realistic novels of pioneer life in the Far West, Zury: The Meanest Man in Spring County (1887) and The McVeys. Other works are The Captain of Company K and The Story of Chicago. He was also the literary editor of the Chicago Tribune. Kirkland died in Chicago at the age of 64.
