= Thomas Rowell Leavitt =

Canadian Mormon and settler (1834–1891)

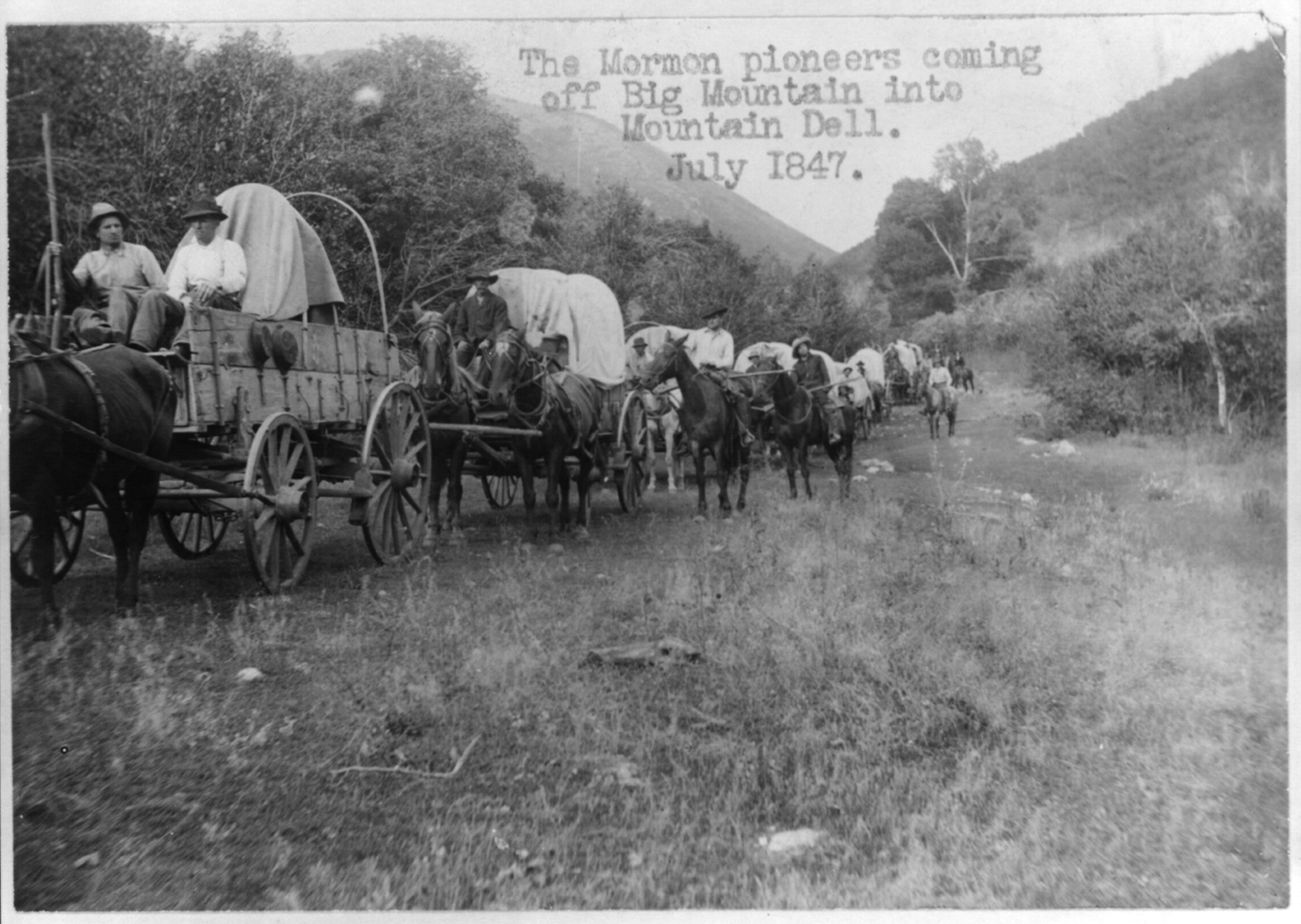
Mormon wagon train re-enactment, similar to that led by Tom Leavitt

Thomas Rowell "Tom" Leavitt (June 30, 1834 – May 21, 1891) was a member of the Church of Jesus Christ of Latter-day Saints and the founding settler of Leavitt, Alberta, Canada, who the former Utah sheriff and marshal founded at age 53 after an arduous 800-mile (1,300 km) journey in covered wagons, fleeing a crackdown on polygamy that sent fellow members of The Church of Jesus Christ of Latter-day Saints across the border to Mexico and Canada.

== Early life ==
Leavitt was born at Hatley, Lower Canada, on June 30, 1834, the son of Jeremiah Leavitt and his wife Sarah Sturdevant Leavitt. Jeremiah Leavitt had been born at Grantham, New Hampshire, in 1797, and married Sarah Sturdevant of Grafton County, New Hampshire, on March 6, 1817, in Vermont. Shortly after their marriage, the couple departed for Hatley, only 15 miles (24 km) from the Canada–Vermont border, where farmer Jeremiah Leavitt was attracted by the rich soil and plentiful timber. At the time of his immigration to Canada, the area around Hatley was fresh from control of Iroquois Native American tribes. Leavitt cleared his new acreage, on which he built a log cabin, and began raising an eventual family of 10 children.

In subsequent years, Jeremiah Leavitt and his wife Sarah joined the Latter-day Saints (Mormons) led by Joseph Smith. Thomas Rowell Leavitt was 16 months old when his parents pulled up stakes to follow Franklin Chamberlain, a Mormon convert who had married Lydia, the oldest child in the Leavitt family. The family returned to the United States, having been converted by Mormon missionaries who swept across eastern Canada on orders of Smith. The Leavitt family remained only briefly in New England, before launching themselves in 1835 towards Kirtland, Ohio, the gathering place of increasing crowds of Mormon converts.

In September 1835, the extended Leavitt family came face-to-face with the man who had converted them long distance: Joseph Smith. No diary exists to describe what they made of their leader, but shortly afterwards the family departed with other recent converts to Smith's religion for Nauvoo, Illinois, the next jumping-off point on the Mormons' westward journey. Along the way, Jeremiah Leavitt's elderly mother, Sarah (Shannon) Leavitt, died of exposure. Having arrived in Nauvoo, the Leavitts bought a farm seven miles (11 km) outside town, where they began planting wheat.

Anti-Mormon sentiment reached a crescendo shortly afterwards, and in 1844 rioters set upon Smith, killing the church prophet and his brother Hyrum, and setting fire to Mormon properties. On August 8, 1844, church elders voted to replace their deceased prophet with Brigham Young, who shortly afterwards announced his intention to found a Mormon sanctuary safe from persecution. Young's decision was prompted by Illinois's move to expel the settlers from its territory. In 1846, the Leavitt family set out as part of Young's trek, with father Jeremiah dying along the way. Ultimately the family got as far as Council Bluffs, Iowa, where what remained of the family built a house overlooking the Missouri River at Trade Point, where they remained three years. By 1850, the worn-out Leavitt family departed for Utah Territory, where they were told that a successful settlement had been made.

== Westward ==
The year 1850 was the highpoint of the California Gold Rush, as well as the Mormon migration westward. On June 1, 1850, a group of Latter-day Saints in 51 wagons, including the Leavitt family, crossed the Mississippi River behind Capt. Milo Andrus. Shortly afterwards, the company reached Salt Lake City. The Leavitt family subsequently moved to northern Utah, where Thomas Rowell Leavitt settled at Wellsville in Cache Valley, where he became constable, marshal and ultimately sheriff, as well as a rancher, and where he built a large one-room log house on his 55-acre (220,000 m^{2}) farm outside Wellsville.

But by the 1880s, the United States government's toleration of the Mormon practice of polygamy came to an end. The government began cracking down, arresting polygamists. Some hid, others crossed the border into Mexico and Canada. Among the first to leave was Charles Ora Card, who traveled to modern-day Cardston, Alberta, named for the Mormon settler, to escape the crackdown and founding the first Mormon town in Alberta in 1887.

== Refuge in Canada ==
Jeremiah Leavitt had never been a polygamist, but his sons followed the subsequent dictum that church members should take multiple wives. Thomas Rowell Leavitt had 26 children with his three wives. Shortly after Card's departure from Utah, former lawman Leavitt followed suit. In early spring 1887 Leavitt left Wellsville with other Mormon polygamists in a large wagon train—the last recorded in the Old West. After an arduous six-week, 800-mile (1,300 km) trek, Leavitt's party reached Lee Creek, Alberta, on May 25, 1887. Leavitt had traveled with his wife Harriet Martha Dowdle and several children by all three wives. He left wife Ann Eliza Jenkins behind on his Wellsville ranch.

By 1897, the rest of the family had followed, including Leavitt's son Alfred, who subsequently helped dig, with his brother, the irrigation canals that Charles Ora Card had promised the Canadian government in exchange for more land grants to fellow Mormons hard-pressed by the U.S. government crackdown.

Leavitt lived out his days in the tiny hamlet he founded in Alberta, known as Buffalo Flats on his arrival, and subsequently christened Leavitt, Alberta, in honor of the pioneer fugitive. Leavitt died there in 1891, leaving a legacy of scores of disciples of the Church of Jesus Christ of Latter-day Saints named Leavitt, many of whom remain in the region today, ranching and living in the bucolic area in the shadow of Chief Mountain.
