= Thomas Leavitt (inventor) =

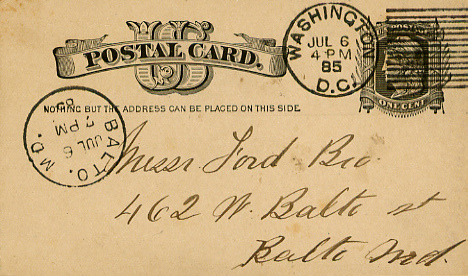
Postal card mailed from Washington, DC, to Baltimore, MD, in 1885 with a Leavitt machine cancellation

Thomas Leavitt (1827–1899) patented, along with his brother Martin Leavitt, the first machine in the U.S. that made machine-cancelled postal letters practicable, enabling the United States Post Office to increase the volume of mail it handled, quickening the pace of delivery and allowing customers to more easily send letters of various sizes.

== Biography ==
Leavitt, a resident of Malden, Massachusetts, was born in 1827 at Hingham, Massachusetts, the son of Martin Lincoln Leavitt, and began working in the early 1870s on a continuous cancelling machine – one that could mechanically sort and stamp envelopes. The postage stamp itself was a relatively new invention, introduced in the U.S. in 1847, and within a couple of decades the volume of U.S. mail began overwhelming hand cancelling, the only practical method of cancelling each stamp so it could not be reused.

By the early 1870s, inventors in Pittsburgh, Pennsylvania, had introduced a machine which allowed the cancelling of postal cards of a standardized size, speeding their processing by eliminating the need for hand-cancelling. But a mechanism which would allow letters of various sizes, shapes and thicknesses to pass through a sorter proved a stumbling block.

In 1875 Thomas Leavitt and his brother Martin were issued United States Patent Number 175,290 for a device which would allow different sizes of letters to have their postage stamps cancelled. The two brothers tested their hand-cranked, hand-fed device at the main Boston Post Office under the watchful eye of postal workers. The device was largely a failure. But after more tinkering, Leavitt and his brother got a second patent (Number 192,519). The Leavitt brothers' second device is considered the first practical device in the U.S. for mechanized cancelling.

Backing Leavitt financially was Henry E. Waite, who advanced Leavitt money for construction of the initial model. Following the death of Martin Leavitt in 1877, Thomas Leavitt continued to work on the brothers' initial invention, eventually enlisting his cousin Elijah Leavitt Howard to help in his machine shop and perfect the device. Leavitt eventually received five patents for his mechanical sorting devices. Most of Leavitt's subsequent improvements were designed to improve the feeder mechanism for sorting envelopes of various sizes and shapes, as well as pulling each envelope through the rollers for cancelling.

In awarding Leavitt's new machine a gold medal at its 1881 exhibition, the Massachusetts Charitable Mechanic Association noted that Leavitt's subsequent improvements on his original patent had perfected the earlier postal card cancelling machine, "allowing letters of large or small size, either thick or thin, to be operated on to perfection." A number of improvements, including a feeder box, a system of double rollers and a movable impression shaft meant that Leavitt's new invention could be used for all manners of letters, instead of for just a standard-sized card. "The machine works to perfection," the judges noted, "and saves a great deal of labor."

The Leavitt machines, first produced in 1875, saw wide usage in Boston, and subsequently in New York through the end of the 1870s, the 1880s and the 1890s. During the decades following introduction of the revolutionary machine, Leavitt refined the design, garnering new patents and introducing new models. By 1880 Leavitt machines were used in 20 American cities. The cancellations produced by Leavitt machines bore distinctive signatures – sometimes horizontal or diagonal lines, or even football shapes.

By 1882, Leavitt's cousin Elijah Leavitt Howard, formerly a machinist in Leavitt's shop, had made a series of modifications to Leavitt's original design, work which was also financed by Henry Waite.

Leavitt's initial models "had serious defects which rendered its use impracticable", noted a later U.S. Patent Court decision of 1901. Following Howard's work, the machine was taken to a Boston post office in 1883, where it was used to sort letters for several hours each day, apparently successfully. Howard's improvements on Leavitt's initial machine – including triggers which prevented the deposit of ink on the machine's pressure roll when no envelope was engaged – worked successfully. But Howard's model was shelved and never introduced commercially.

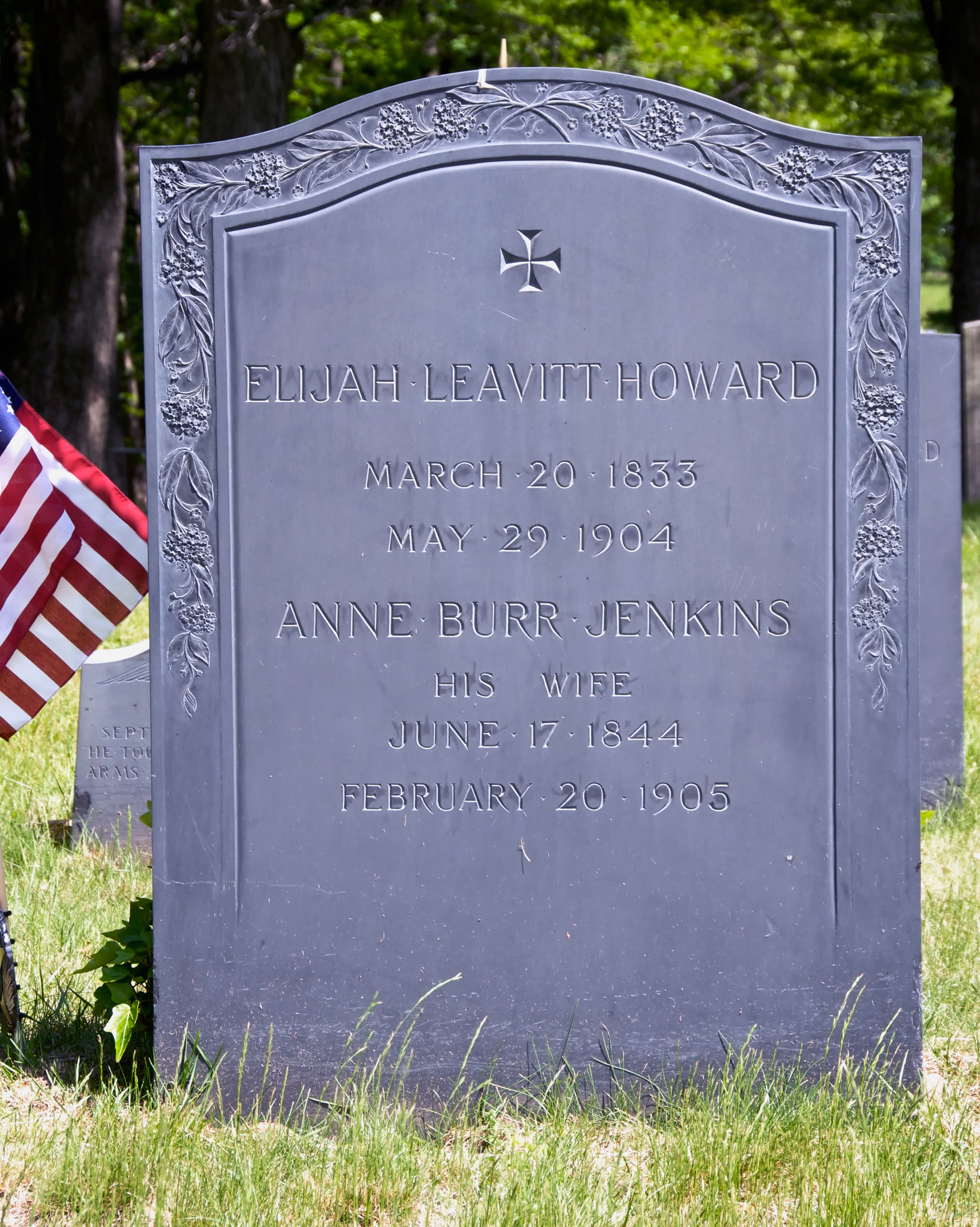
Gravestone of Elijah Leavitt Howard, Hingham, Massachusetts. Howard helped his cousin Thomas Leavitt in designing machines to machine-cancel mail

Following the tests, Howard tinkered with his version of Leavitt's cancelling machine to make it quieter and easier to use. But Howard's machine was eventually shelved after its testing. Later, when a competing inventor came up with a modified machine (after having studied prints of Howard's model), the U.S. Patent Courts held the machine did not infringe on Leavitt's initial patent. Because Howard had never introduced his variation, the new model was simply a 'failed experiment'.

The field was opening to a slew of new developers. The next decade brought new competitors to the postal cancelling machine business, with the American Postal Machine Company introducing a line of devices in the 1890s noted for their speed. Soon there were scores of competitors hungry for business from the exploding volumes of United States mail.

Thomas Leavitt, who set off the stampede with his first design, was married to Martha Elizabeth Whittier of Cornville, Maine, in 1851. The inventor died in 1899 and his wife Martha died in 1910. The couple had four children.

== See also ==
- Machine postmark
- United States Postal Service
