= Thomas Leavitt (settler) =

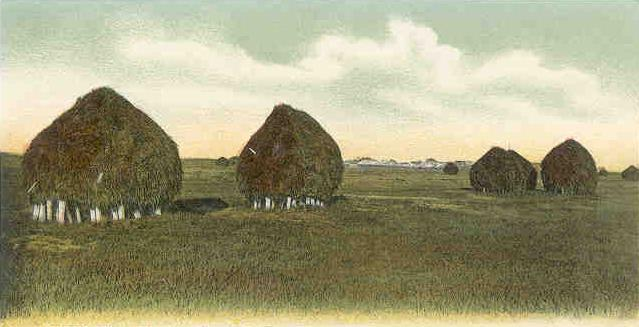
Salt marshes, Hampton Beach, New Hampshire. Early postcard, c. 1905.

Thomas Leavitt (1616–1696) was an English Puritan who was one of the earliest permanent settlers of the Province of New Hampshire. A farmer, Leavitt apparently followed Rev. John Wheelwright to his settlement of Exeter, New Hampshire. Leavitt later moved on to Hampton. He was seldom involved in town business, and was described by one writer as "a quiet, useful citizen."

== Life in the new world ==
Thomas Leavitt arrived in Boston, Massachusetts Bay Colony, in 1635, and a city record from the following year shows him assessed a fine. Leavitt departed in 1639 for Exeter, Province of New Hampshire, where the Rev. John Wheelwright, a Puritan clergyman forced to flee England because of fears of persecution—and later forced to leave Massachusetts because of run-ins with ecclesiastical authorities—had settled and assembled a congregation. Leavitt remained in Exeter only a few years before eventually settling at nearby Hampton, one of the four original New Hampshire townships chartered by the General Court of Massachusetts.

Thomas Leavitt was a farmer and perhaps a tanner, although one ancient deed called him 'planter.' This term may or may not have been literal, as the term planter was often interchanged with the word “settler” in the vernacular of the time. In 1639, Leavitt was a signer of the Exeter Combination, but soon left Exeter for Hampton, where by 1644 he had married Isabella (Bland) Asten, daughter of John Bland (alias Smith) and Isabella Drake of Colchester, Essex, England (and later of Watertown, Massachusetts, and Martha's Vineyard) and widow of Francis Asten, who had died in the New World a couple of years prior. Leavitt and his new wife lived on the land granted to Asten in Hampton.

Nothing is known of Leavitt's parentage or even place of birth in England, although some historians speculate that Leavitt came from heavily Puritan Lincolnshire. His name appears in various permutations in early records, mostly as Levet, but also as Levit, Levitt and Levett – sometimes all in the same document. The manner of spelling was complicated by the fact that Leavitt apparently was not literate, and simply made his mark in early documents. When his name was written for him by someone else, as it was in his will and that of his wife, the orthography almost always appeared as Levet. But a copy of the Hampton Petition of 1643, filed in the Massachusetts Archives with the early settler's name appended to the list of signatories, records his name as "Livet".

Leavitt served as selectman for Hampton in 1657 and again a decade later, in 1667. In 1664 he served a year's term as constable. His name appeared on the list of several juries, and in 1678 he took the oath of allegiance to Massachusetts. By 1683 he, along with 18 other citizens, including Christopher Hussey, signed a petition asking that their poll taxes be cut as the signers were aged, "many about seventy, some above eighty, others near ninety, being past labour and work." By 1691 Leavitt and his wife had delegated their power of attorney to son John to deal with his mother Isabel's share of the Bland family lands on Martha's Vineyard.

Thomas Leavitt died at Hampton, New Hampshire, on November 28, 1696, while still residing on the land granted to his wife's first husband. His widow died three years later, in 1699. The couple had four sons, all of whom lived nearby and who left descendants who still reside in the area today. In his will Leavitt had made provisions for his wife, leaving her land and "two cows, two swine, three sheep, my brass and puter [pewter], the thirds of all my corne." Leavitt also carefully disposed of his tools, leaving his son Aretas "half the cross cut saw," with son John receiving "the other half the tools mentioned with all carpenter tools and his house and ground." The will makes note of 219 acres (0.89 km^{2}) of land, including 5 acres (20,000 m^{2}) of swampland, owned by Leavitt which he left to his wife and children.

Thomas Leavitt was buried at Pine Grove Cemetery in Hampton in 1696.

== See also ==
- Stephen Bachiler
- Leavitt
