= The Harvard Monthly =

Literary magazine

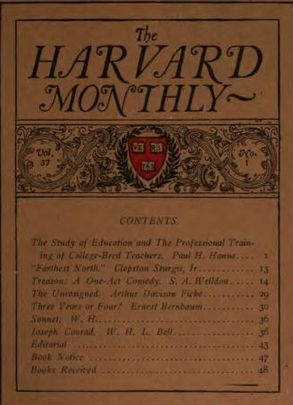
Cover-art of The Harvard Monthly, 1903

The Harvard Monthly was a literary magazine of Harvard University in Cambridge, Massachusetts, beginning October 1885 until suspending publication following the Spring 1917 issue.

Formed in the latter months of 1885 by Harvard seniors William Woodward Baldwin, Thomas Parker Sanborn, Alanson B. Houghton, George Santayana, William Morton Fullerton, and George Rice Carpenter, the magazine proposed to afford "...a medium for the strongest and soberest undergraduate thought of the college...". These six men comprised the Monthly's initial staff, with Houghton as editor, Baldwin as business manager and the others acting as editors. The initial October 1885 issue includes works by Sanborn, Santayana, Houghton, Fullerton the magazine's faculty adviser, Barrett Wendell, among others. Some of the essays in this issue which may have been felt controversial have no stated author. In regard to this issue, The Harvard Crimson observed that "The unique form and general typographical make-up of the new monthly is extremely pleasing; it is quite a departure from the form of any magazine we have seen. The table of contents consists of stories, sketches, criticisms, poems, editorials and book reviews, choice morsels for the most delicate palate. It was announced that a feature of each number would be an article from the pen of some prominent alumnus."

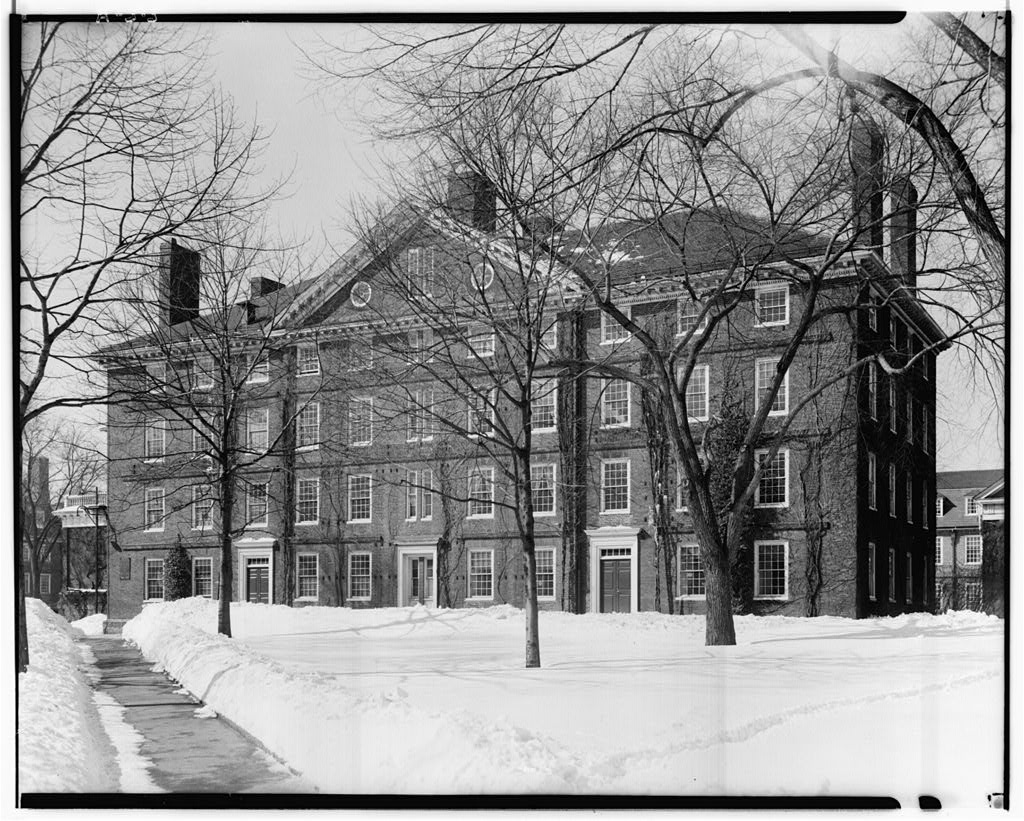
The Harvard Monthly was born in George Santayana's room in Hollis Hall.

The Monthly ceased publication in 1917, due to issues involving the First World War, and The Harvard Advocate, a literary publication of Harvard College since 1866, became the primary source of essays, fiction, and poetry for the Harvard community.

== History ==
=== Founding and subsequent years ===
The aim of the Monthly is primarily to preserve, as far as possible, the best literary work that is produced in college by undergraduates.

For thirteen years, President Charles William Eliot had been attempting to transform Harvard from a provincially famous institution into a nationally recognized and admired leader in higher education. He believed that to do so, Harvard needed to attract students who came from all over the country, not just from Boston—and not just the wealthy. The academic curriculum needed to cater not just students in the liberal arts, but also ones who saw higher education as a path towards upward mobility, and as a way to pursue non-humanist studies. "The 1880s was in a sense the 'last gasp' of the leisured gentlemen, the last time they would dominate the university's academic and social structure." What seemed a mass movement toward practicality and specialization that would drain the university of the aestheticism and humanism frustrated the young men who would eventually found the Monthly; each was involved with one or more of the other Harvard literary publications—the Lampoon, the Advocate, and the Crimson, which didn't offer the creative outlet they felt necessary. Toward the end of their junior year, W.W. Baldwin and T.P. Sanborn brainstormed in the latter's room in Grays Hall, proceeding to A.B. Houghton's room in Holyoke and, after gathering W.M. Fullerton and G.R. Carpenter, assembling in Santayana's room in Hollis Hall, where they agreed to move forward with a plan for a true literary magazine. They vowed their work would not bespeak the scrupulous consciousness of John Bunyan's Puritan Pilgrim, but rather the doubting scrutiny of William Dean Howells' Silas Lapham who, in Howells’ story, prevails over the empty, hypocritical norms of proper Boston society. Houghton was elected editor-in-chief. "The title, 'Harvard Monthly', was adopted... instead of 'Harvard Literary Monthly'... lest it might be called the Harvard Lit and thus bring us up for comparison with Yale's sombre-hued institution."

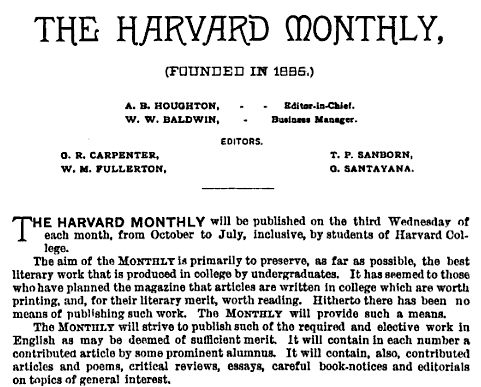
First page of Vol.1 The Harvard Monthly, October 1885

The new magazine was announced in the Crimson as being published the third Wednesday of each month from October to July for the price of twenty-five cents. The second issue featured an article by Harvard alumnus, Franklin Benjamin Sanborn, father of editor Thomas Sanborn, titled Harvard in the Struggle for Emancipation.; The magazine continued to include the works of Harvard staff and prominent graduates including Philip Gilbert Hamerton, Phillips Brooks, Crawford Howell Toy, Albert Bushnell Hart and Andrew Preston Peabody By its second year, the staff of the Monthly had grown from six to eleven, and included Bernard Berenson. The roots of what Santayana would later develop into a full-fledged philosophical disassociation with things American can be found in his undergraduate writings, particularly in those submitted to the Monthly George Santayana would remain involved with the magazine while a professor at Harvard, submitting material until 1903.

On the magazine's second anniversary, the Boston Daily Advertiser recounted its brief history and proclaimed the magazine was "vastly superior to any other college journal", that the literature was "absolutely and inherently good," and that some articles had even garnered favorable comment from abroad.

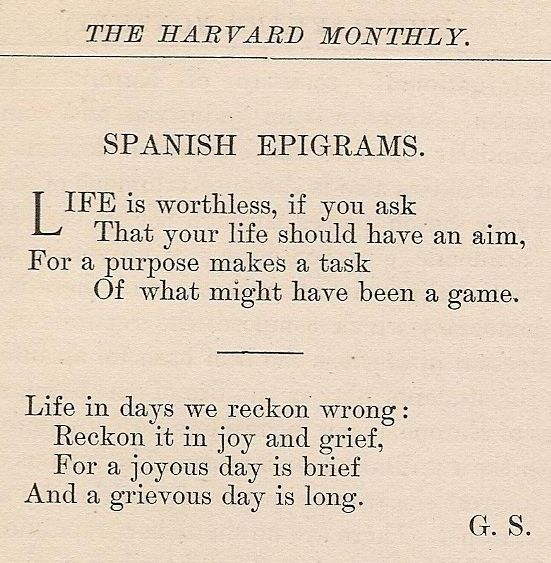
Poem by George Santayana from Vol.1, No.4 The Harvard Monthly, January 1886

Those who subsequently served the Monthly include Bernhard Berenson, William Vaughn Moody, Norman Hapgood, Henry Milner Rideout, Philip Henry Savage, Trumbull Stickney, Robert Herrick, John Reed, Charles Macomb Flandrau, Pierre de Chaignon la Rose, Clifford Herschel Moore, Robert Morss Lovett, Hermann Hagedorn, M.A. DeWolfe Howe, Thomas W. Lamont,Lucien Price, John Hall Wheelock, Bliss Carman, Edwin Arlington Robinson Conrad Aiken,Joseph Auslander, Malcolm Cowley, Scofield Thayer, Robert Hillyer, Gilbert Seldes, John Dos Passos, and E. E. Cummings.

=== Demise ===
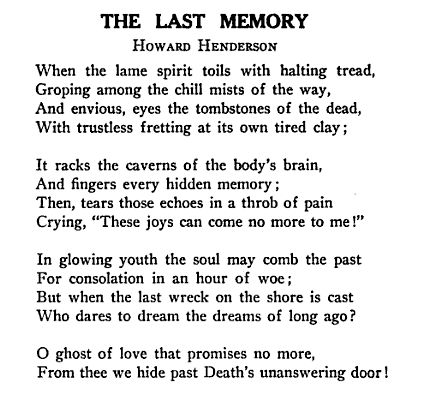
A final entry in the last issue of The Harvard Monthly; the author served in WWI and returned home.

The Harvard Monthly ceased publication with Volume 64, in May 1917, with the following words within black bordering: "The editors of the monthly regret that existing circumstances compel the suspension of publication during the immediate future." The "circumstances" involved World War I and a campus gearing-up for war, with passionate disagreements erupting among Monthly staff members, as described years later by Malcolm Cowley in an on-line biography of his friend, Monthly editor E.E. Cummings. "[Cummings] took no part in the debate over preparedness for war, one which shook the country in the winter of 1916-17 and which, as a minor effect, disrupted the board of The Harvard Monthly. Four of the editors were pacifists, the other four were superpatriots, all eight were impractical, and they couldn't agree on what to print. In April 1917, when Congress declared war, The Monthly disappeared from Harvard, but not from memory." No clear reason for the journal's cessation was provided either by the Monthly itself or in the Crimson, where the May 5, 1917 issue states, "The present issue [of The Harvard Monthly] is of peculiar interest as it is the last number of the Monthly to appear before the temporary suspension of publication. This, to whatever "existing circumstances" it may be due, is a great misfortune. The Monthly was never resurrected, and the Harvard Advocate became Harvard's only literary publication, possibly subsuming the sort of material which had differentiated it from its sister-journal, which may have been due to a tradition of being different. Monthly alumnus Malcolm Cowley offered the following insight in his biography of E.E. Cummings: "There were two such magazines at Harvard in those days [just prior to WWI], The Monthly and The Advocate, and they looked down on each other—-or, to be accurate, they nodded to each other coldly from the facing doors of their respective sanctums on the dusty third floor of the Harvard Union. The Monthlies thought that the board of The Advocate, which then appeared fortnightly, was composed of journalists, clubmen, athletes, and disciples of Teddy Roosevelt, a former editor, with not a man of letters among them. The Advocates suspected that the Monthlies were aesthetes (as indeed most of them came to be called), scruffy poets, socialists, pacifists, or worse. It was for The Monthly that Cummings chose to write."

=== Significance ===
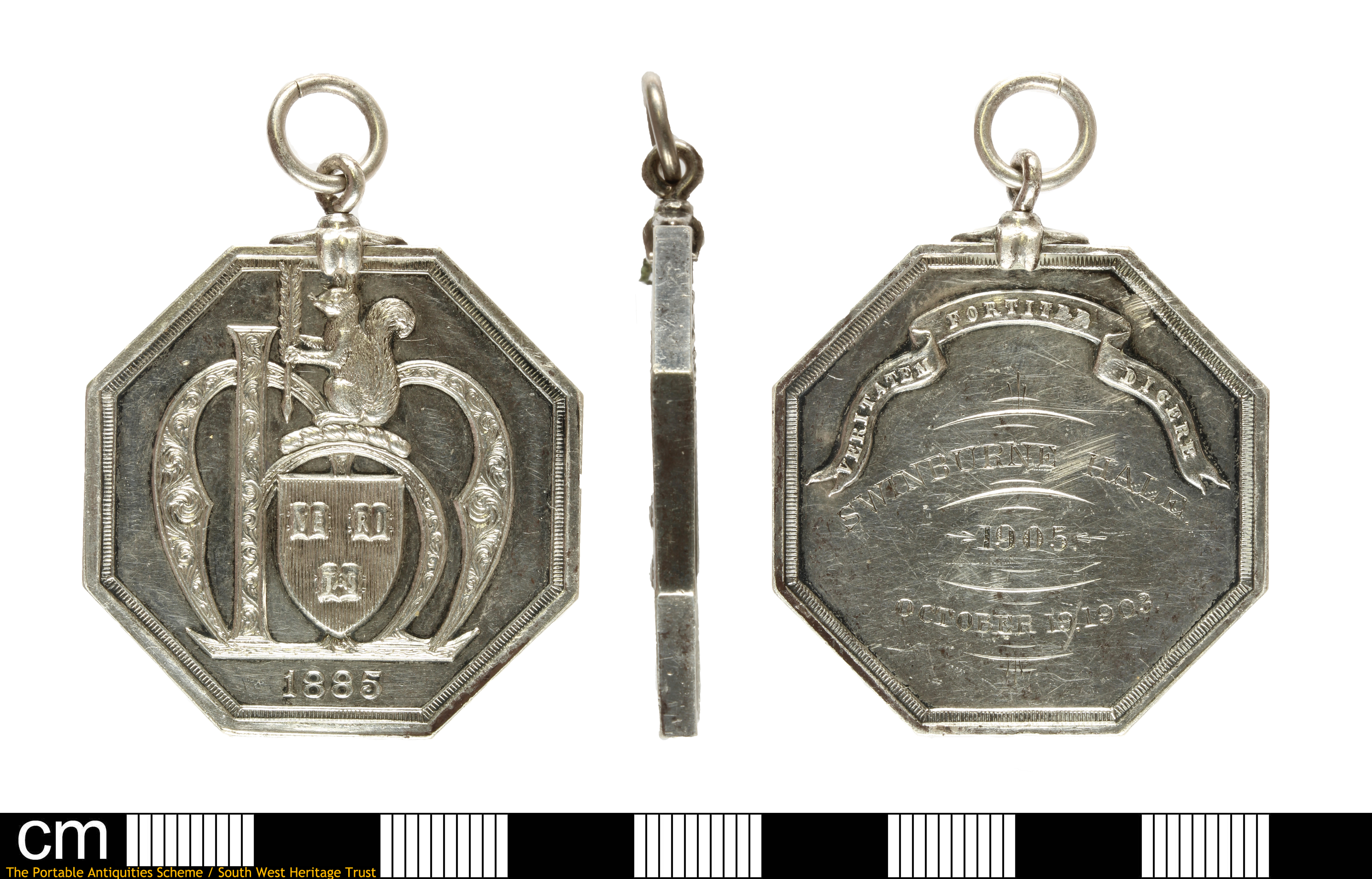
Harvard Monthly medal awarded to Swinburne Hale in 1905

The Harvard Monthly met the intentions of its founders and within ten years was said to have improved the quality of writing and thereby strengthened the English Department at Harvard. "The Monthly has always had a close relation to the English department, the growth of which was the direct cause of its appearance, and it furnishes the best record of the literary standards and ambitions of the undergraduates who make English their chief interest. It is the expression of the growth of a special academic tendency towards the study of literary form and of literary and general criticism." Within ten years of its beginning, The Monthly was known to have published the best literary work done by undergraduates; its series of graduate articles has included many of exceptional value and interest; its influence in the college world has always been in the direction of earnestness and seriousness. Seeking only to reflect "the strongest and soberest undergraduate thought", The Monthly provided "a medium of communication between students and graduates" which had not existed in any other of Harvard's periodicals. By the magazine's twenty-fifth anniversary, it was described as "proof... of the undergraduate cultivation of creative, critical and persuasive letters that still distinguishes the university...from most other in America." That "proof" may best lie in the fact of The Harvard Monthly's many graduates, who went on to make significant contributions to the world.

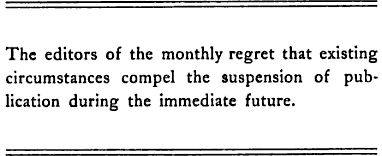
Notice published in the final issue of The Harvard Monthly, May 1917

The Harvard Monthly ceased publication in 1917. For more than thirty years, the monthly journal was produced in accordance with the original plans of six enthusiastic young men who brainstormed in George Santayana's room in Hollis Hall: a medium for undergraduate thought, issued monthly from October to July, the significance of which could not be denied. The Harvard Crimson, in reporting the suspension of the Monthly, opined that the journal, "... has filled to a certain extent the important post of Devil's Advocate amid the blatant orthodoxy of undergraduate life... Harvard sorely needed the Monthly. In the world outside it was looked on as one of the proofs of Harvard's difference from other colleges. The existence of such a magazine indicated... a desire to think things through, to reject ready-made opinions for the mere reason that they were ready-made, to hold a little aloof from current lanes of thought. Such a spirit, only too rare in our land of gigantic uniformities, and almost non-existent in our colleges, gave one hope that here at least a leaven was working which would ultimately transform American thought from the flabby courageless thing it is into something new and liberating." In the forward to an autobiography of former Monthly editor John Hall Wheelock, literary historian Jay B. Hubbell is quoted as saying, "prior to World War I the history of American Literature was the history of Harvard College." The Harvard Monthly belonged to that time.

Dingbat from Volume 52

=== Staff ===
Volume 1: October 1885 to February 1886

- Editor-in-Chief: A. B. Houghton
- Business Manager: W.W. Baldwin
- Editors: G.R. Carpenter, W.M. Fullerton, W.A. Leahy, T.P. Sanborn, H.S. Sanford, G. Santayana

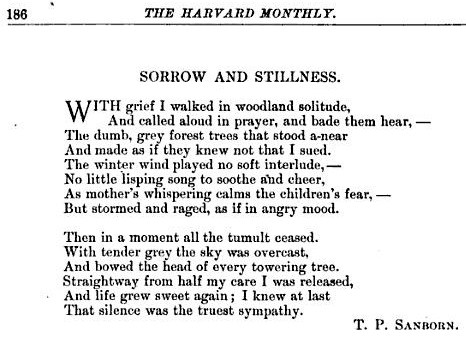

Volume 2: March 1886 to July 1886

- Editor-in-Chief: G.R. Carpenter
- Business Managers: W.W. Baldwin and F.H. Sellers
- Editors: W.M. Fullerton, T.P. Sanborn, G. Santayana, G.P. Baker Jr., B. Berenson, H.G. Bruce, W. A. Leahy, H.S. Sanford

Volume 3: October 1886 to February 1887

- Editor-in-Chief: G.P. Baker Jr.
- Business Manager: F.H. Sellers
- Editors: B. Berenson, H.G. Bruce, W.A. Leahy, H.S. Sanford

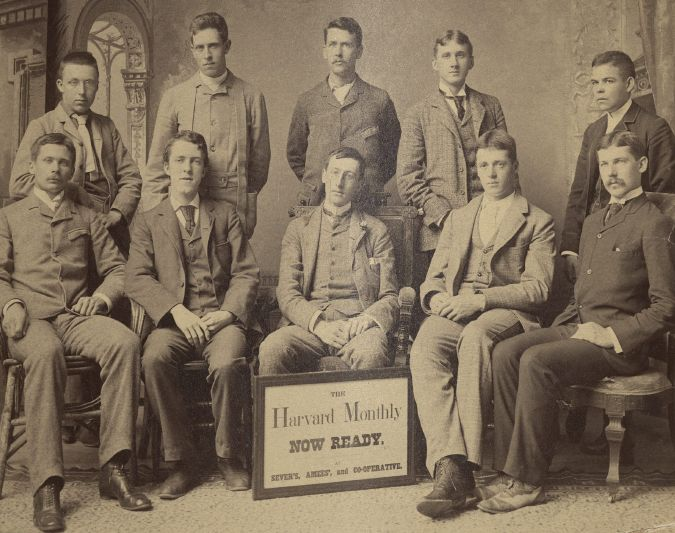
Staff of the Monthly, 1888

Volume 5: October 1887 to February 1888

- Editor in Chief: M.A. DeWolfe Howe Jr.
- Business Manager: W.D. Bancroft
- Editors: H.G. Bruce, R.E. Neil Dodge, W.A. Leahy, H.S. Sanford Jr.

Volume 6: March 1888 to July 1888

- Editor-in-Chief: H.S. Sanford Jr.
- Business Manager: C.H. Moore
- Editors: Herbert Bates, H.G. Bruce, R.E. Neil Dodge, Robert W. Herrick, W.A. Leahy, Charles T. Sempers

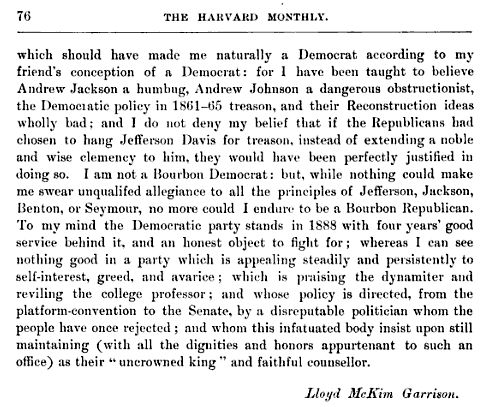
Portion of an article in Vol. 7 titled "Why I Am Not a Republican" by L.M. Garrison (1867-1900), son of Wendell Phillips Garrison and grandson of abolitionist William Lloyd Garrison

Volumes 7-8: October 1888 to February 1889, March 1889 to July 1889

- Editor-in-Chief: R.E. Neil Dodge
- Business Manager: Philip S. Abbot
- Editors: Herbert Bates, Norman Hapgood, Robert Herrick, Hugh McCulloch, Jr., H. T. Parker, Charles T. Sempers

Volume 9: October 1889 to February 1890

- Editor-in-Chief: Robert Herrick
- Business Managers: Philip S. Abbott, T.W. Lamont
- Editors: Herbert Bates, R.E. Neil Dodge, Norman Hapgood, Hugh McCulloch, Jr.

Volume 10: March 1890 to July 1890

- Editor-in-Chief: Norman Hapgood
- Business Managers: S.P. Duffield, T.W. Lamont
- Editors: Philip S. Abbot, Herbert Bates, R.E. Neil Dodge, H.A. Davis, Robert Herrick, Hugh McCulloch, Jr., William Vaughn Moody

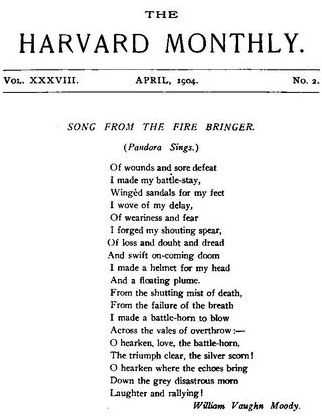

Volumes 11-12: October 1890 to February 1891, March 1891 to July 1891

- Editor-in-Chief: Hugh McCulloch, Jr.
- Business Managers: T.W. Lamont, B.P. Duffield, Frederick Winsor
- Editors: Philip S. Abbot, R.E.Neil Dodge, William V. Moody, H.A. Davis, Robert M. Lovett, Horace A. Davis, S.P. Duffield

Volumes 13-14: October 1891 to February 1892, March 1892 to July 1892

- Editor-in-Chief: Robert Morss Lovett
- Business Managers: T.W. Lamont, Maynard Ladd, Frederick Minsor
- Editors: Philip S. Abbot, Samuel P. Duffield, Norman Hapgood, Hugh McCulloch, Jr., William V. Moody, Philip H. Savage, Joseph T. Stickney, Henry Ware

*Volumes 15-16: October 1892 to July 1893, March 1893 to July 1893

- Editor-in-Chief: Henry Ware
- Business Managers: Frederick Winson, Maynard Ladd, William Hapgood
- Editors: Robert Morss Lovett, Hugh McCulloch, Jr., William Vaughn Moody, John R. Oliver, Edward K. Rand, Pierre La Rose, Philip Henry Savage, Joseph T. Stickney

Volume 17: October 1893 to February 1894

- Editor-in-Chief: John Rathbone Oliver
- Business Managers: Maynard Ladd, William P. Hapgood, Chauney G. Carter
- Editors: Hugh McCulloch, Jr., Edward K. Rand, Pierre La Rose, Joseph T. Stickney, Charles Macomb Flandrau

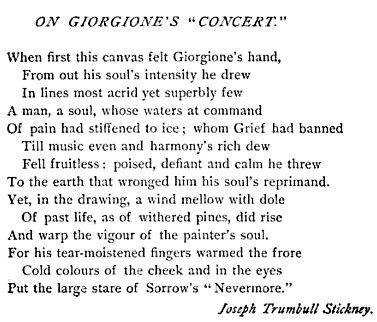

Volume 18: March 1894 to July 1894

- Editor-in-Chief: Edward K. Rand
- Business Manager: Edwin O. Merrill
- Editors: Winfred Thaxter Denison, Charles Macomb Flandrau, Henry C. Greene, Hugh McCulloch, Jr., John R. Oliver, Pierre La Rose, Joseph T. Stickney

Volume 19: October 1894 to February 1895

- Editor-in-Chief: Pierre LaRose
- Business Manager: Edwin Godfrey Merrill
- Editors: Winfred Thaxter Denison, Charles Macomb Flandrau, Arthur Stanwood Pier, Trumbull Stickney

Volume 20: March 1895 to July 1895

- Contributors (no masthead present for this collection): Henry Copley Greene, Trumbull Stickney, Carleton E. Noyes, Archer Robinson, Joseph Potter Cotton Jr., Winfred Thaxter Denison, Philip Jacob Gentner
- Robert Palfrey Utter, Bliss Carman, Frederick Street Hoppin Jr., Lewis E. Gates, Arthur Stanwood Pier, Henry Wise Miller, Daniel Gregory Mason, Henry Alexander Phillips, Robert Walcott, Joseph William Sharts

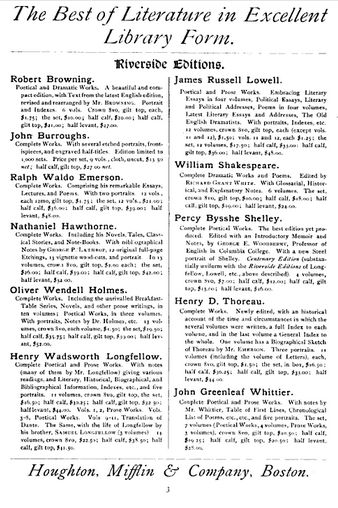
Advertisement in Vol. 21 of the Monthly

Volume 21: January 1896 to February 1896

- Editor-in-Chief: Winfred Thaxter Denison
- Secretary: Henry Alexander Phillips
- Business Manager: William Belmont Parker
- Editors: Joseph Potter Cotton Jr., Henry Wise Miller, Archer Tyler Robinson

Volume 22: March 1896 to July 1896

- Contributors (no masthead present for this collection): Henry Taylor Parker, Henry Alexander Phillips, Arthur Robinson, Frederick Atherton, Trumbull Stickney, Henry Wise Miller, Eugene A. Zinetti, Robert Steed Dunn, William Pepperell Montague Jr., P. H. Savage, D. Winter, Beulah Marie Dix, Philip Singleton, Frank C. Hinckley, Arthur Stanwood Pier, Gaillard Thomas Lapsley, Henry Eastman Lower

Volume 23: October 1896 to February 1897

- Editor-in-Chief: Henry Alexander Phillips
- Business Manager: William Belmont Parker
- Editors: Robert Steed Dunn, Henry Wise Miller, Robert Palfrey Utter

Volume 24: March 1897 to July 1897

- Editor-in-Chief: Henry Alexander Phillips
- Secretary: Robert Steed Dunn
- Business Manager: William Belmont Parker
- Editors: Henry Wise Miller, E.W.Sutton Pickhardt, Alfred Zantzinger Reed, Henry Milner Rideout, Robert Palfrey Utter, S.R. Wrightington

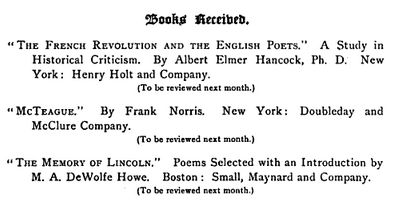

Volume 25: October 1897 to February 1898

- Contributors (no masthead present for this collection): George Santayana, Daniel Gregory, Robert Steed Dunn, P.H. Savage, William Belmont Parker, E.W.Sutton Pickhardt, Henry Milner Rideout, Ira N. Hollis, Percy W. Long, Henry Thew Stephenson
- William Lee Raymond, Jarvis Kelley, Max Savage, Pierre La Rose, Daniel Gregory Mason, Henry Copley Green, Arthur Stanwood Pier, Philip Greenleaf Carleton, Fred C. Gratwick, Trumbull Stickney, C.B. Newton, Lewis D. Humphrey

Volume 26: March 1898 to July 1898

- Editor-in-Chief: Robert Steed Dunn
- Secretary: Henry Milner Rideout
- Business Manager: Cameron Blaikie
- Editors: Walter Conrad Arensberg, Raynal Cawthorne Bolling, Philip Greenleaf Carleton, James Grant Forbes, Jarvis Keiley, E.W. Sutton Pickhardt, William Lee Raymond, Maxwell Sands Savage, Robert Palfrey Utter

Volumes 27-28: October 1898 to February 1899, March 1899 to July 1899

- Editor-in-Chief: Henry Milner Rideout
- Business Manager: James A. Ballentine
- Editors: Walter Conrad Arensberg, Raynal Cawthrone Bolling, Philip Greenleaf Carleton, James Grant Forbes, Jarvis Keiley, Philip Lee Miller, William Morrow, William Lee Raymond, Maxwell Sands Savage, Jarvis Keiley

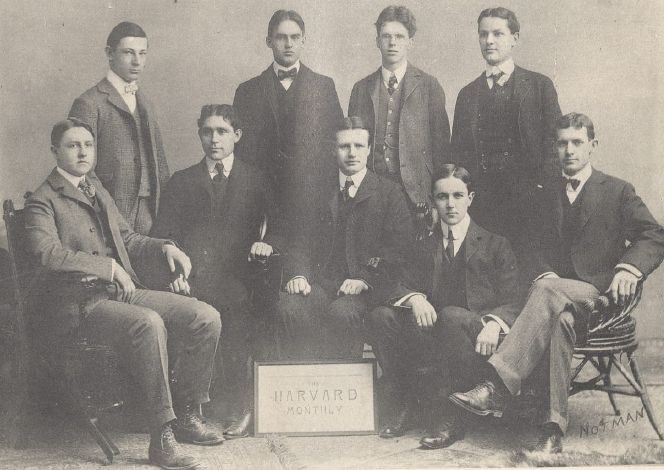
Staff of the Monthly, 1900

Volumes 29-30: October 1899 to February 1900, March 1900 to July 1900

- Editor-in-Chief: William Morrow
- Business Manager: Henry J. Winslow
- Editors: Walter Conrad Arensberg, Raynal Cawthorne Bolling, James Grant Forbes, William Jones, Gilbert Holland Montague

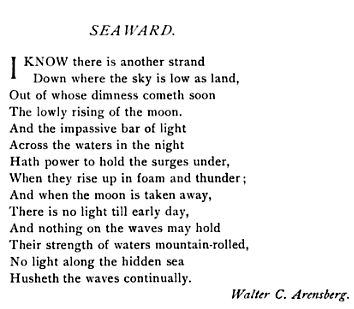

Volume 31: October 1900 to February 1901

- Contributors (no masthead present for this collection): William Vaughn Moody, John LaFarge, Jr., G.H. Montague, James Grant Forbes
- George C. Hirst, William Morrow, Joseph Trumbull Stickney, Rowland Thomas, James Platt White, R.M. Green, Albert Heminway Michelson
- E.A. Robinson, Lauriston Ward, L.M. Crosbie, George Santayana, Barrett Wendell Jr., R.M. Green, F.W.Reynolds, Bradford K. Daniels

Volume 32: March 1901 to July 1901

- Editor-in-Chief: James Grant Forbes
- Business Manager: Charles Ernest Reck
- Assistant Business manager: Herbert Spencer Martin
- Editors: John LaFarge, Jr., Robert Montraville Green, Lauriston Ward, Benjamin B. Lee, Gilbert Holland Montague, Hoyt Landon Warner

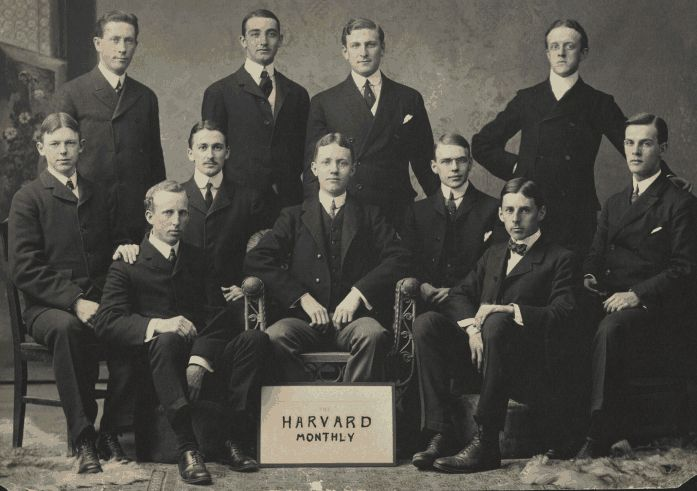
Staff of the Monthly, 1902

Volumes 33-34: October 1901 to February 1902, March 1902 to July 1902

- Editor-in-Chief: Robert Montraville Green
- Business Manager: Herbert Spencer Martin
- Assistant Business Managers: Alfred Edward Ells, Arthur Linwood Thayer, Merwin Kimball Hart
- Editors: Laurence Murray Crosbie, George Clarkson Hirst, Henry Wyman Holmes, Harold Stanley Pollard, Howard Ruggles Van Law, Lauriston Ward, Hoyt Landon Warner, Barrett Wendell Jr., Samuel Alfred Welldon

Volume 35: October 1902 to February 1903

- Editor-in-Chief: Lauriston Ward
- Business Manager: Merwin Kimball Hart
- Editors: Vincent Van Marter Beede, William Harris Laird Bell, Ernest Bernbaum, Oscar James Campbell Jr., Laurence Murray Crosbie, Henry Wyman Holmes, Hoyt Landon Warner, Samuel Alfred Welldon

Volume 36: March 1903 to July 1903

- Editor-in-Chief: Hoyt Landon Warner
- Business Manager: Merwin Kimball Hart
- Assistant Business Managers: Enoch Lewis Burnham, Richard Henry Miller
- Editors: Vincent Van Marter Beede, William Harris Laird Bell, Ernest Bernbaum, John Victor Judah Brandon, Oscar James Campbell Jr., Laurence Murray Crosbie, Henry Wyman Holmes, Lauriston Ward, Samuel Alfred Welldon

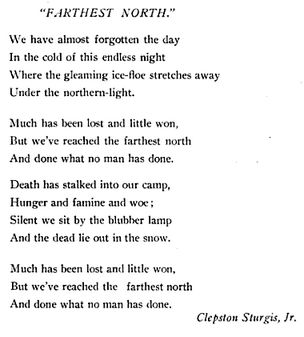

Volumes 37- 38: October 1903 to February 1904, March 1904 to July 1904

- Editor-in-Chief: William Harris Laird Bell
- Business Manager: Enoch Lewis Burnham
- Assistant Business Managers: Richard Henry Miller, Leonard Hastings Schoff, Maurice Wertheim, Charles Eliot Ware Jr.
- Editors: Oric Bates, Vincent Van Marter Beede, Henry Adams Bellows, Laurence Murray Crosbie, Paul Pembroke Crosbie, Hermann Hagedorn Jr., Swinburne Hale, Charles Tripp Ryder, Richard Clipston Sturgis Jr., Samuel Alfred Welldon

Volumes 39-40: March 1905 to July 1905, October 1904 to February 1905

- Editor-in-Chief: Swinburne Hale, 1905
- Secretary: Hermann Hagedorn Jr., 1907
- Business Manager: Maurice Wertheim, 1906
- Assistant Business Managers: Richard Henry Miller, 1905, Robert Faulkner Putnam, 1905, Alfred Phelps Crum, 1906, George Andrews Moriarty, Jr., 1906, Charles Eliot Ware Jr., 1906
- Editors: Oric Bates, 1905, Chester Holbrook Brown, 1905, Paul Pembroke Crosbie, 1905, Richard Clipston Sturgis Jr., 1905, Henry Adams Bellows, 1906, Charles Tripp Ryder, 1906, Fredrick Drew Webster, 1906, Junius Lucien Price, 1907

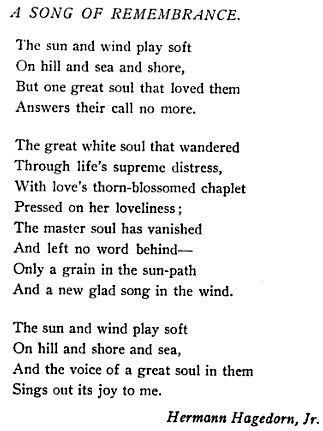

Volumes 41-42: October 1905 to February 1906, March 1906 to July 1906

- Editor-in Chief: Henry Adams Bellows
- Secretary: Maurice Wertheim
- Business Manager: Charles Eliot Ware Jr.
- Assistant Business Managers: Alfred Phelps Crum, George Andrews Moriarity Jr., Oliver Colt Wagstaff, William Francis Low Jr., Rush Richard Sloane, John William Baker
- Editors: Charles Tripp Ryder, Frederick Drew Webster, Hermann Hagedorn, Junius Lucien Price, Edward Royce, Ralph Montgomery Arkush, John Hall Wheelock

Volumes 43-44: October 1906 to February 1907, March 1907 to July 1907

- Contributors (no masthead present for this collection): Hermann Hagedorn Jr., John Hall Wheelock, Robert Emmons Rogers, Ralph Montgomery Arkush, Henry Adams Bellows, Edward Eyre Hunt
- Willard Huntington Wright, William Leavitt Stoddard, Charles Henry Dickerman, Rudolph Altrocchi, Richard John Walsh, Herbert Ellsworth Cory, Harold Wilmerding Bell
- Edward Brewster Sheldon, Reginald Lindsey Sweet, Lucien Price, James Thayer Addison, Van Wyck Brooks, Allan Davis, Gerald Abbot Seabury
- Charles Wharton Stork, David Carb, Lee Simonson, Edward Gilman Curtis, Alexander Forbes, Charles Edward Whitmore, Guy Emerson, Paul Ainslee Anderson, Witter Bynner, Frederick Elroy Greene,
- Milo Harvey Moolman, Edward Rieman Lewis, Kenneth Brooke Townsend, John Silas Reed, Howard Howland Brown, H.B. Adams, Frederick Moore

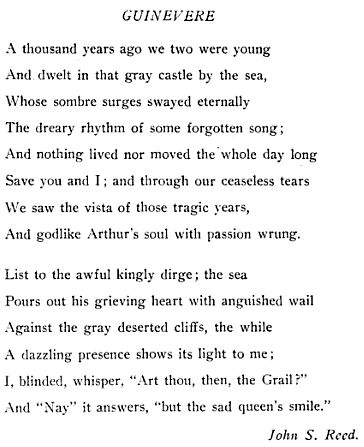

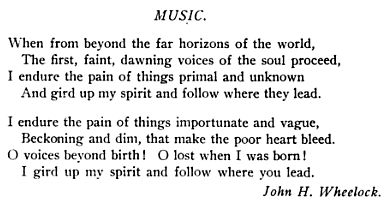

Volume 45: October 1907 to February 1908

- Contributors (no masthead present for this collection): E.R. Lewis, C.H. Dickerman, E.J. David, J.H. Wheelock, E.B. Sheldon,
- John Silas Reed, D. Carb, A.W. Murdock, E.E. Hunt, W.H. Twillinghast, L.Simonson, R.E. Rogers, R. Allrocchi, K.B. Townsend, L. Grandgent, B.G. Brawley, L.D. Cox, J.S. Miller

Volume 46: March 1908 to July 1908

- Editor-in-Chief: John Hall Wheelock
- Secretary: Rudolph Altrocchi
- Business Manager: Harold Minot Pitman
- Assistant Business Managers: Harry Edmund Aulsbrook, John William Baker, Rush Richard Sloane, Walter Max Knaus
- Editors: Laurie Davidson Cox, Guy Emerson, Edward Rieman Lewis, James Thayer Addison, David Card, Louis Grandgent, Robert Emmons Rogers, Edward Eyre Hunt, John Silas Reed

Volumes 47-48: October 1908 to February 1909, March 1909 to July 1909

- Editor-in-Chief: Robert Emmons Rogers
- Secretary: James Thayer Addison
- Business Manager: Joseph Webster Adams Jr.
- Assistant Business Managers: Joseph Webster Adams Jr., Harold Pitman, Walter Max Kraus
- Editors: David Carb, Louis Grandgent, Henry Beston Sheahan, Roy Wilson Follet, Clarence Dewey Britten, Earle Wentworth Huckel, Edward Eyre Hunt, John Silas Reed, Paul Mariett, John Stocker Miller Jr.

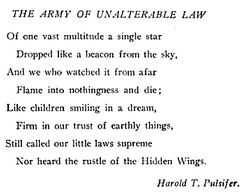

Volumes 49-50: October 1909 to February 1910, March 1910 to July 1910

- Editor-in-Chief: Edward Eyre Hunt
- Secretary: John Stocker Miller Jr.
- Business Manager: Joseph Webster Adams
- Editors:Clarence Dewey Britten, Norman Foerster, Clarence Earle Hale, Earle Wentworth Huckel, Walter Lippmann, John Silas Reed, Alan Seeger, Kenneth Roscoe MacGowan, Paul Mariett, Philip Snedeker, James Gorden Gilkey, Richard Douglas, Elliott Dunlap Smith, Wheeler Sammons

Volume 51: October 1910 to February 1911

- Contributors (no masthead present for this collection): Thomas H. Uzzell, Philip Snedeker, H.W. O'Connor, Walter Lippmann, J.S. Reed, Norman Foerster, Lothrop Withington, R.E. Robbins, Paul Mariett, H.J. Seligmann, Grover Harrison
- H.K. Moderwell, J. Gordon Gilkey, Rollo Britten, Earle Wentworth Huckel, Robert M. Yerkes, Hubert V. Coryell, Theodore H. Wilbur, Harry R. Blythe, Kenneth W. Hunter
- B.G. Whitmore, J. Donald Adams, C.V. Wright, C.B. Harris, Stanton Coit Kelton, J.D. Adams, E.W. Wescott, Grover Harrison, C. Gouverneur Hoffman

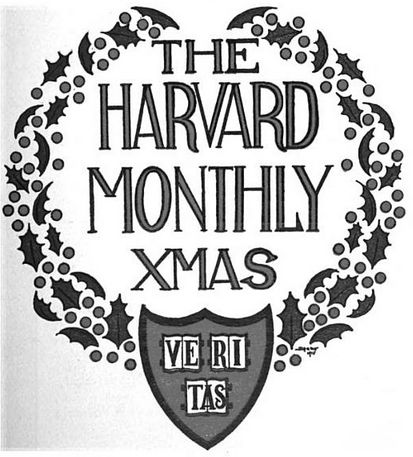

Volume 52: February 1911 to July 1911

- Editor-in-Chief: Paul Mariett
- Assistant Editor: Kenneth Macgowan
- Editors and Contributors: George Cronyn, C.V. Wright, Kenneth W. Hunter, Grover Harrison, Herbert J. Seligmann, J. Gordon Gilkey, Richard Douglas, Alanson Skinner, Woodburn E. Remington, H.K. Moderwell, Florence Lincoln, J. Donald Adams, David Carb, Percy MacKaye ('97), Walter Prichard Eaton ('00), E.W.Wescott

Volume 53: October 1911 to February 1912

- Editor-in-Chief: Richard Douglas
- Secretary: Hiram K. Moderwell
- Business Manager: Wheeler Sammons
- Assistant Business Managers: Elliott D. Smith, Herman R. Page, S. Paul Speer
- Editors: Clarence Britten, James Gordon Gilkey, Herbert J. Seligmann, Rollo Britten, Grover Harrison, Cyril B. Harris, J. Donald Adams, Cuthbert V. Wright, Gilbert V. Seldes

Volume 54: March 1912 to July 1912

- Editor-in-Chief: Clarence Britten
- Secretary: Cuthbert V. Wright
- Business Manager: Wheeler Sammons
- Assistant Business Managers: Elliott D. Smith, Herman R. Page, S. Paul Speer, O. Williams
- Editors: James Gordon Gilkey, Richard Douglas, Rollo Britten, Grover Harrison, J. Donald Adams, Cyril B. Harris, Scofield Thayer, Gilbert V. Seldes, Arthur Wilson

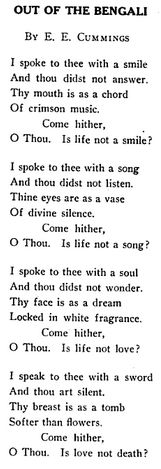

Volume 56: March 1913 to July 1913

- Editor-in-Chief: Cyril Beverly Harris
- Secretary: Scofield Thayer
- Business Manager: Herman R. Page
- Assistant Business Managers: S. Paul Speer, Robert G. Dort, Richardson Morris, Curtis T. Vaughan, Osgood Williams
- Editors: J. Donald Adams, Grover Harrison, W. Roger Burlingame, Irving Pichel, C. Merrill Rogers, Gilbert Seldes, Charles H. Weston, E. Estlin Cummings, Arthur Wilson, Cuthbert Wright

Volume 57: October 1913 to February 1914

- Editor-in-Chief: Charles Hartshorne Weston
- Secretary: Charles Merrill Rogers
- Treasurer: Osgood Williams
- Subscription Manager: Richardson Morris
- Assistant Business Managers: Robert G. Dort, Curtis T. Vaughn
- Editors: Irving Pichel, Gilbert Vivian Seldes, Edward Estlin Cummings, Richard Dana Skinner, Robert Gruntal Nathan

Volume 59-60: October 1914 to February 1915

- Editor-in-Chief: Richard Dana Skinner
- Secretary: E. Estlin Cummings
- Robert G. Nathan, Arthur Wilson, H.B. Poucher
- Treasurer: Robert G. Dort
- Advertising Manager: Paul C. Rodgers
- Circulation Manager: E. Milton Petersen, W.H. Shattuck
- Contributors: B. P. Clark Jr., Elisha Whittelsey, R.S. Mitchell, R.W. Chubb, R.G. Nathan, J. Garland, Ben Sion Trynin, J.R. Dos Passos

Volumes 63-64: October 1916 to May 1917 (suspension of production)

- Editor-in-Chief: C.G. Paulding (absent), A.K. McComb (Editor-in-Chief pro tempore)
- Secretary: Robert Littell (absent), Elisha Whittlesey (Secretary pro tempore)
- Treauurer: William Burry
- Circulation Manager: D.E. Lynn
- Advertising Manager: G.W. Emery, W.H. Cary Jr.
- Editors: P.F. Reniers, H. Henderson (absent), Dudley Poore, Cuthbert Wright, Thatcher Nelson, B.D. Allinson, A.D. Fay, F.D. Perkins

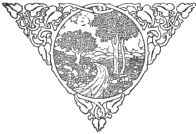
Harvard Monthly Dingbat, vol. 52

== See also ==
- List of literary magazines
