= Harvard Magazine =

American university alumni magazine

- Editor: Joanna Weiss
- Categories: Alumni magazine
- Frequency: Bimonthly
- Founded: 1898
- Company: Harvard Magazine Inc.
- Country: United States
- Based in: Cambridge, Massachusetts, U.S.
- Language: English
- Website: harvardmagazine.com
- ISSN: 0095-2427
- OCLC: 1524117262

Harvard Magazine is an independently edited magazine and separately incorporated affiliate of Harvard University. It is the only publication covering the entire university and regularly distributed to all graduates, faculty, and staff.

The magazine was founded in 1898 by alumni for alumni with the mission of "keeping alumni of Harvard University connected to the university and to each other". One of the magazine's founders was William Morton Fullerton, a foreign correspondent for The Times.

The magazine has gone through three name changes. It was originally called the Harvard Bulletin. In 1910, the name was changed to the Harvard Alumni Bulletin. In 1973, it took on its current name, Harvard Magazine.

Harvard Magazine has a BPA Worldwide-audited circulation of 258,000 among alumni, faculty, and staff in the United States.
