= Henry Milner Rideout =

American novelist

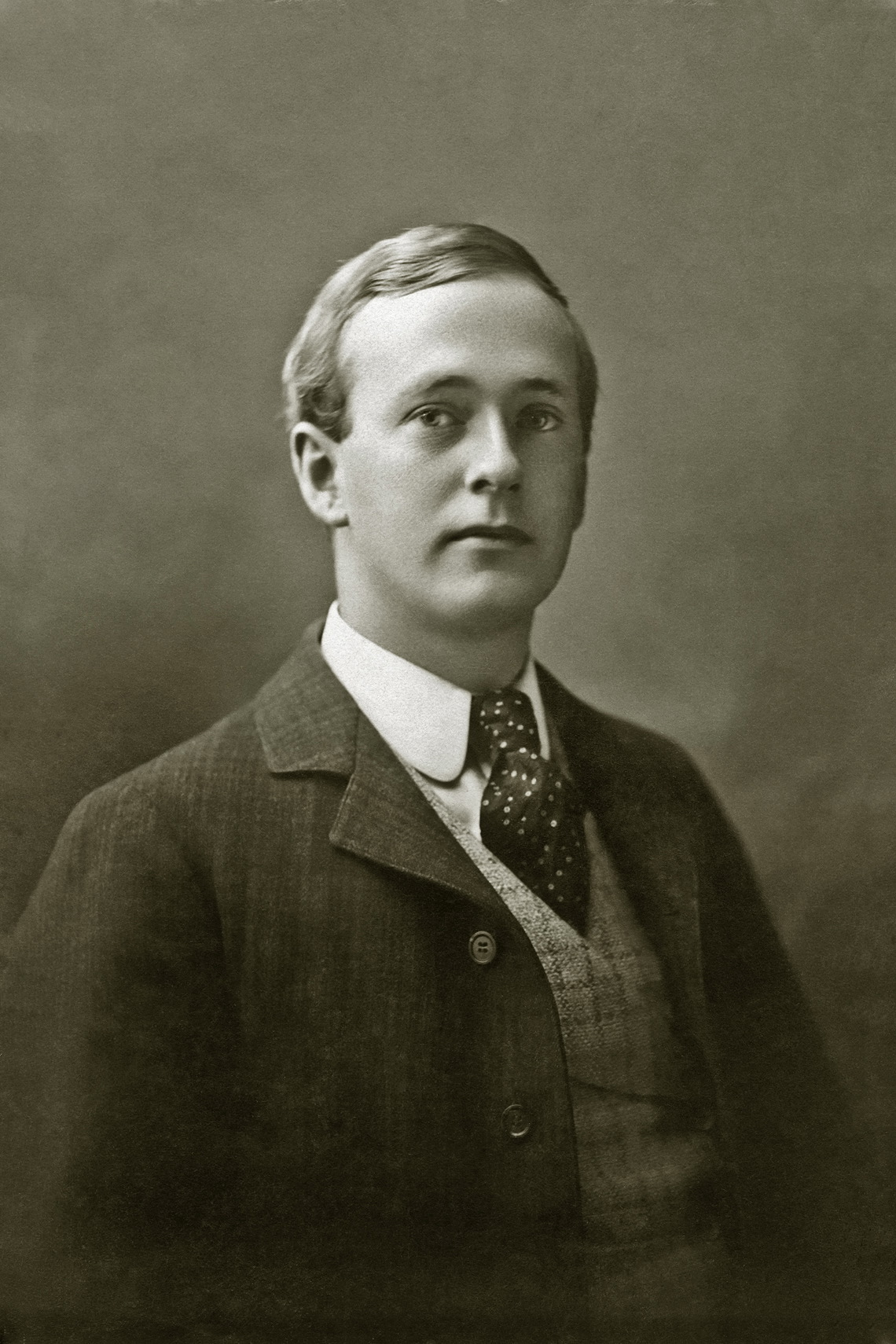
Henry Milner Rideout

Henry Milner Rideout (1877–1927) was an American writer. A native of Calais, Maine, he was the author of sixteen novels, twenty-three short stories and novellas and a biographical memoir. He also edited one college textbook and was co-editor of three others. Many of his stories appeared in The Saturday Evening Post.

== Rideout's Life ==
Rideout's father, a miller and road contractor, died when Rideout was twelve. Rideout's elder brother, who managed a bank in California, became the support of the family. At school, Rideout's ability caught the attention of his English teacher, Laura Burns, who was a cousin of the distinguished Harvard professor of English, Charles Townsend Copeland. She and Copeland motivated a group of Calais townspeople to lend Rideout the wherewithal to enter Harvard in 1895, where he was the first in his family to attend college. At Harvard, his literary talent came to the fore. Eventually he became Editor-in-Chief of The Harvard Monthly. His friends at Harvard included William Morrow, William Jones, Raynal Bolling, and Arthur Ruhl. After graduating in 1899 as Class Odist, Rideout was an instructor in the Harvard English department.

Four years later, his college debts were paid and Rideout was free to turn away from a promising but uncongenial academic career. The Atlantic Monthly had accepted two of his short stories, giving him hope of earning his living by his pen. To gather background material, he set off from San Francisco for six months of travel in the Far East under contract to the American Woolen Company, reporting on jute mills in the Philippines, Indonesia, and India. Keeping careful notes, writing long detailed letters to his brother, he observed so well and later used atmosphere so skillfully that readers familiar with places such as Bangkok or Canton were persuaded that Rideout's familiarity equaled their own. During that arduous circumnavigation, Rideout made lifelong friendships with various expatriate working people, especially sea captains. When his final jute-reports were filed, he returned via Europe, and settled down in central California with his bank-manager brother to begin an all-out effort to write novels for a living.

In California, he met his future wife Frances Reed, also a gifted writer. They lived in her family home in Sausalito where they raised their three children. There were a number of Rideout cousins in California, among them the playwright Ransom Rideout (1899–1975), whose play "Goin' Home" was performed on Broadway in 1928 and staged by Antoinette Perry and Brock Pemberton, and who wrote dialogue for the film Hallelujah!, directed by King Vidor. As Rideout's work gained renown, readers in the United States, Canada, and Great Britain were eager for his stories. His eminence became such that the San Francisco Chronicle ran a banner headline announcing his sudden death from pneumonia while on a family trip to Europe.

== Critical appraisal ==
In a 1920 essay titled "The National Letters," H.L. Mencken said,

One constantly observes the collapse and surrender of writers who started out with aims far above that of the magazine nabob. I could draw up a long, long list of such victims: Henry Milner Rideout, Jack London, Owen Johnson, Chester Baily Fernald. . . .

Yet a study of Rideout's life reveals that his literary career was more like a workman following traditions of honest craftsmanship. Rideout's Far Eastern voyage also fits into his Down East heritage. Maine Rideouts had been shipbuilders since the late seventeenth century. They were lumbermen who cut the trees to build those ships. Some were farmers who made the most of the resources of the Maine coast by building a family schooner to venture to China or India on a trading voyage. Rideout set out to seek literary treasure on the other side of the world. With workmanlike modesty, Rideout spoke of his stories as his "yarns." Even when he became well known, he never saw himself as a literary figure, and he despised coteries, literary movements, and intellectual snobbery.

Rideout's fiction drew from two different sources: Maine background, or exotic background. Though his most acclaimed work is in the former vein, yet toward the end of his life he did equally well with a group of traditional Chinese tales told him at the Sausalito kitchen table by his friend Pan Ruguei. Those stories were collected as Tao Tales. John Macy said in a 1928 review that Rideout set the Chinese stories in "enticingly classic English."

The classical training absorbed at Harvard shows in the commemorative ode commissioned from Rideout for the Tercentennial Anniversary of the settlement of Saint Croix Island, Maine in 1904. Moreover, that ode, alone of all the Tercentennial speeches and formalities, makes mention of Native Americans. This awareness shows in his college friendship with William Jones, the Native-American anthropologist who died in the Philippines in 1909. (William Morrow and Raynal Bolling commissioned Rideout to write a memorial biography of Jones.) Rideout's last published work was an adventure story, Lola the Bear, set in the Maine woods among tribal people with whom Rideout had hunted and fished since boyhood.

Rideout was a man who found ordinary people more interesting than high society. For example, he made friends with the engineer of a Cunard liner rather than with the first class passengers in the salon of that liner. He loathed cities, and his fictional heroes were country people and working men. The heroine of his late novel, Barbry, was an indentured servant girl.

It is appropriate that Maine lumberjack songs and sea chanteys recorded by Rideout are preserved on wax cylinders in the archive of the American Folklife Center at the Library of Congress. The Dictionary of American Biography contains an entry for Henry Milner Rideout with information supplied by his widow.

In his valedictory 1928 review, John Macy pays tribute to Rideout's work:

The masculinity of substance and manner sets Rideout's New England tales apart from the exquisite idylls of Mary Wilkins, Sarah Orne Jewett, and Alice Brown. He has their ear for the familiar speech of country people, but his intellectual fiber is more close-knit and tough than their charming homespun. On the other side it is equally far from the tar-and-tarpaulin kind of fiction...

— Henry Milner Rideout, a Romancer of the two Easts,, New York Herald Tribune, August 5, 1928.

== Works by Henry Milner Rideout ==
=== Novels ===
- The Siamese Cat (1907)
- Admiral's Light (1907)
- Dragon's Blood (1909)
- The Twisted Foot (1910)
- White Tiger (1915)
- The Far Cry (1916)
- Tin Cowrie Dass (1918)
- Boldero (1918)
- The Key of the Fields (1918)
- Fern Seed (1920)
- The Winter Bell (1922)
- The Footpath Way (1923)
- Barbry (1923)
- The Man Eater (1924)
- Dulcarnon (1925)
- Lola the Bear (1928)

(Most of these were serialized in The Saturday Evening Post, as were the greater number of the short stories and novellas listed below.)

=== Short stories, novelettes and novellas ===
- Wild Justice (1903)
- Blue Peter
- Captain Christy

(All three appeared in The Atlantic Monthly and were published in one volume in 1906, titled Beached Keels.)

- Hantu (The Atlantic Monthly, 1906, and later in The Spinner's Book of Fiction, 1907)
- The Padre's Volcano (Everybody's Magazine,1906)
- Bull's Eye (1909)
- Fair Play (1910)
- The Hand of Glory (1915)
- The Rainbow (1915)
- Parimban's Daughter (1916)
- The Camellia Tree (1916)
- Hury Seke (1917)
- After Dark (1918)
- Goliah (1918)
- Surprising Grace (1918)
- The Golden Wreath(1919)
- Saxby Gale (1918)
- Fortune's Darling (1919)
- Runa's Holiday (1919)
- The Toad (1920)
- "The Other Day", "Powers of Darkness", "The Seeds of Time", "Old Things," "The Old Fighter's Children", "The Sunny Pool," "The Fat Nun's Blue Parrot," "Man-Woman Free," and "Surf Rats" (Short stories collected as Tao Tales, 1927).

=== Memoir ===
- William Jones: Indian, Cowboy, American Scholar, and Anthropologist in the Field (1912)

=== Textbooks ===
- Letters of Thomas Gray (1899) (Edited with Charles T Copeland)
- Tennyson's "The Princess" Nineteenth century literature (1899) (Gateway Series)
- Freshman English and Theme-Correcting in Harvard College (1901) (With Charles T. Copeland)
- Selections from Byron, Shelley, Keats, and Browning (1909)
