= Winslow Wilson =

American painter (1892–1974)

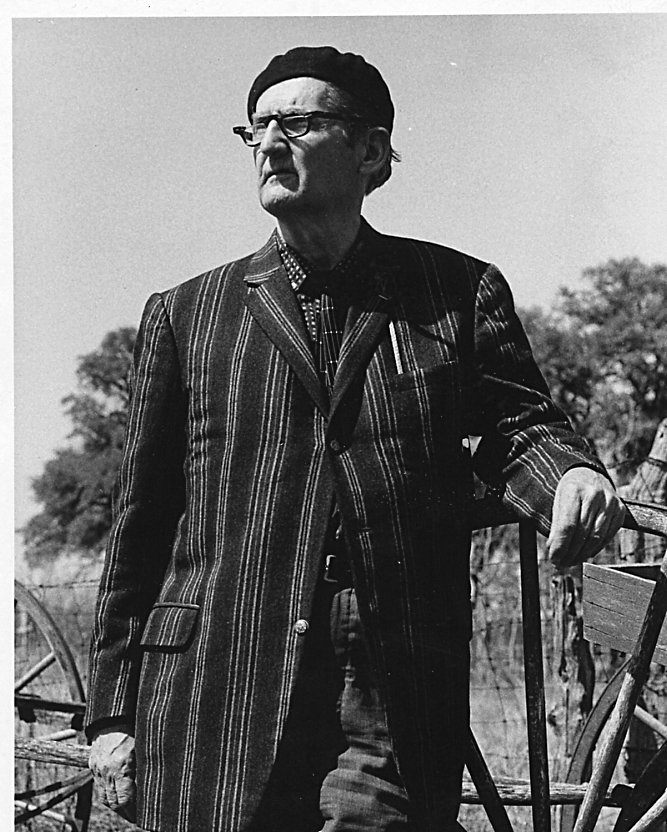
- Born: Arthur William Wilson; July 20, 1892; Brady, Texas
- Died: November 18, 1974 (aged 82); Miami, Florida
- Resting place: Fort Sam Houston, San Antonio, Texas
- Other names: Winslow Wilson, Pico Miran, Tex Wilson
- Occupations: Artist, Professor
- Website: http://www.winslowwilson.com

Signature
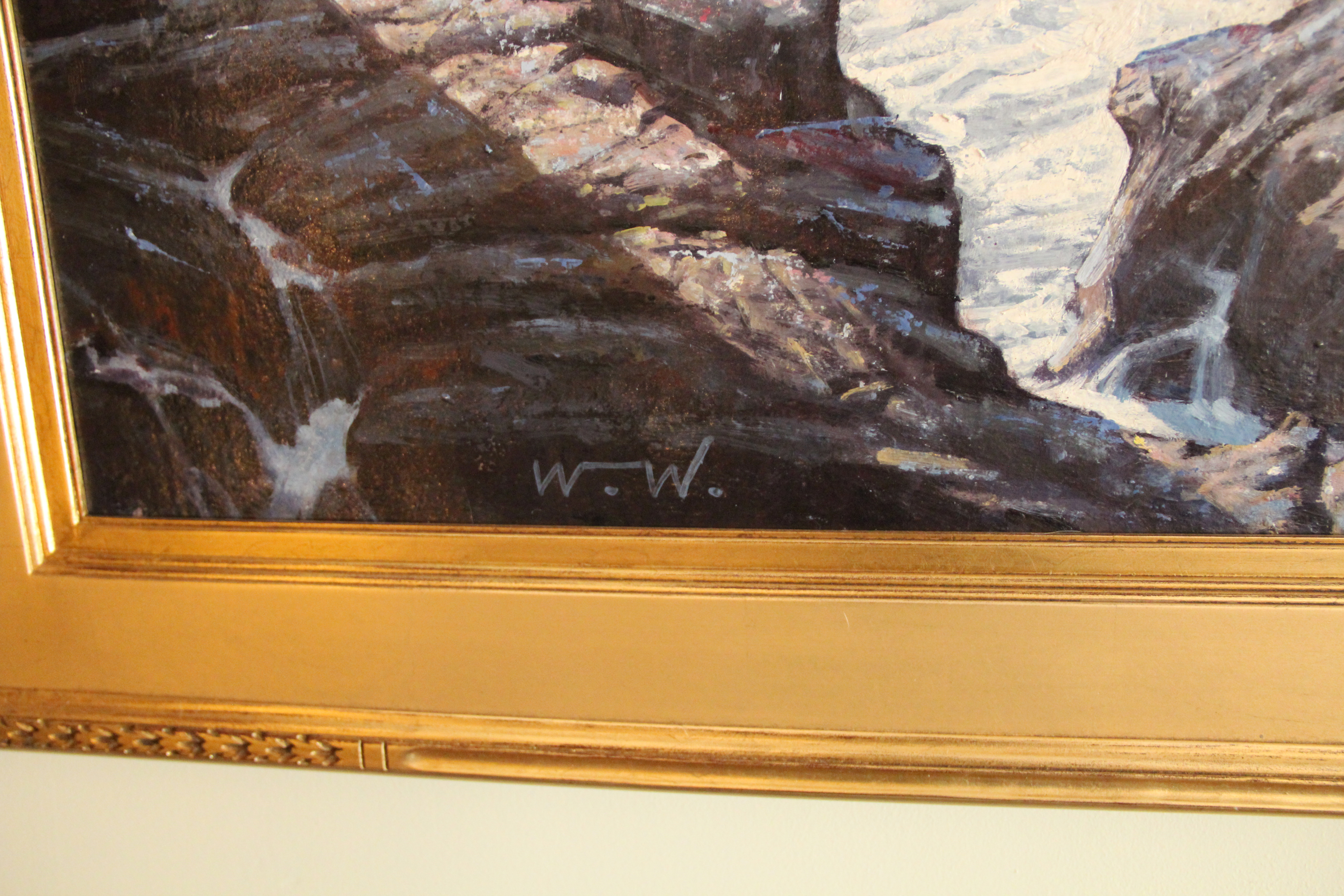

Arthur William Wilson (July 20, 1892 – November 18, 1974) was an American artist who painted under several known pseudonyms, including Winslow Wilson and Pico Miran. In Gloucester, Wilson/Miran has been considered an early actor in the Post Modern Art Movement. He is widely quoted from his Manifesto For Post-Modern Art, published in 1951, under the name Pico Miran.

== Biography ==
Wilson was born in Brady, Texas in 1892, one of five sons of Horace and Stella Wilson. The family moved to Junction, Texas, and it was here that he graduated high school. He attended Texas A&M in 1910-1911 as a Chemical Engineering Major, but transferred to Harvard with the support of professors at Texas A&M. Wilson attended Harvard College between 1911 and 1915, becoming an Editor of The Harvard Monthly with his friends John Dos Passos and e.e. Cummings. Wilson would go on to share an apartment at 21 East 15th Street in New York City with e.e. Cummings. He enlisted in the U.S. Military during 1917–1919, joining John Dos Passos and e.e. Cummings and other Harvard students in France. He spent time in Paris with e.e. Cummings, and mingled with Salvador Dalí, Pablo Picasso and other influential painters of the period in London and Paris in the 1920s. In fact, Wilson maintained lifelong friendships with many of the Harvard Aesthetes, including e.e. Cummings, Dos Passos, Scofield Thayer, Gilbert Seldes and Stewart Mitchell. During his days at Harvard, Wilson was playfully known as "Tex", a nickname that stayed with him for life. In New York, Wilson was a contributor to The Dial along with many influential literary persons of the time.

== Career ==
Wilson was active in the New York, NY, Lime Rock, CT, Newport, RI, Gloucester, MA, and Rockport, MA art scenes between the 1930s and 1972. Wilson painted post-modern artwork utilizing the name Pico Miran in his Gloucester, Massachusetts studio, taught portraiture at the Rockport Art Association in Rockport, Massachusetts under the name Winslow Wilson, and painted seascapes as Winslow Wilson in his Rockport, Massachusetts studio.

Wilson was strongly influenced by his time at Harvard and World War I. In addition to a tragic event in Boston which resulted in the death of one of Wilson's friends in 1912, there is evidence that Wilson encountered trauma during World War I. According to family sources, Wilson was an Army Air Force gunner who parachuted from his plane during the War and was stranded hanging in a tree for several days before being rescued. Art became a vehicle through which Wilson found solace. His Post-Modern artwork is replete with images of industrial and nuclear effects upon the common man, and those who knew him confirm that he was consumed with the concept of a nuclear holocaust. Growing up in rural Texas, to a life in Boston and New York, friendships with intellectuals, Wilson's writings reveal a man who held his craft and opinions in high regard. Understanding that Wilson eschewed family relationships while fully immersing himself as a bit of an artistic recluse, provides an insight into the life of this artist.

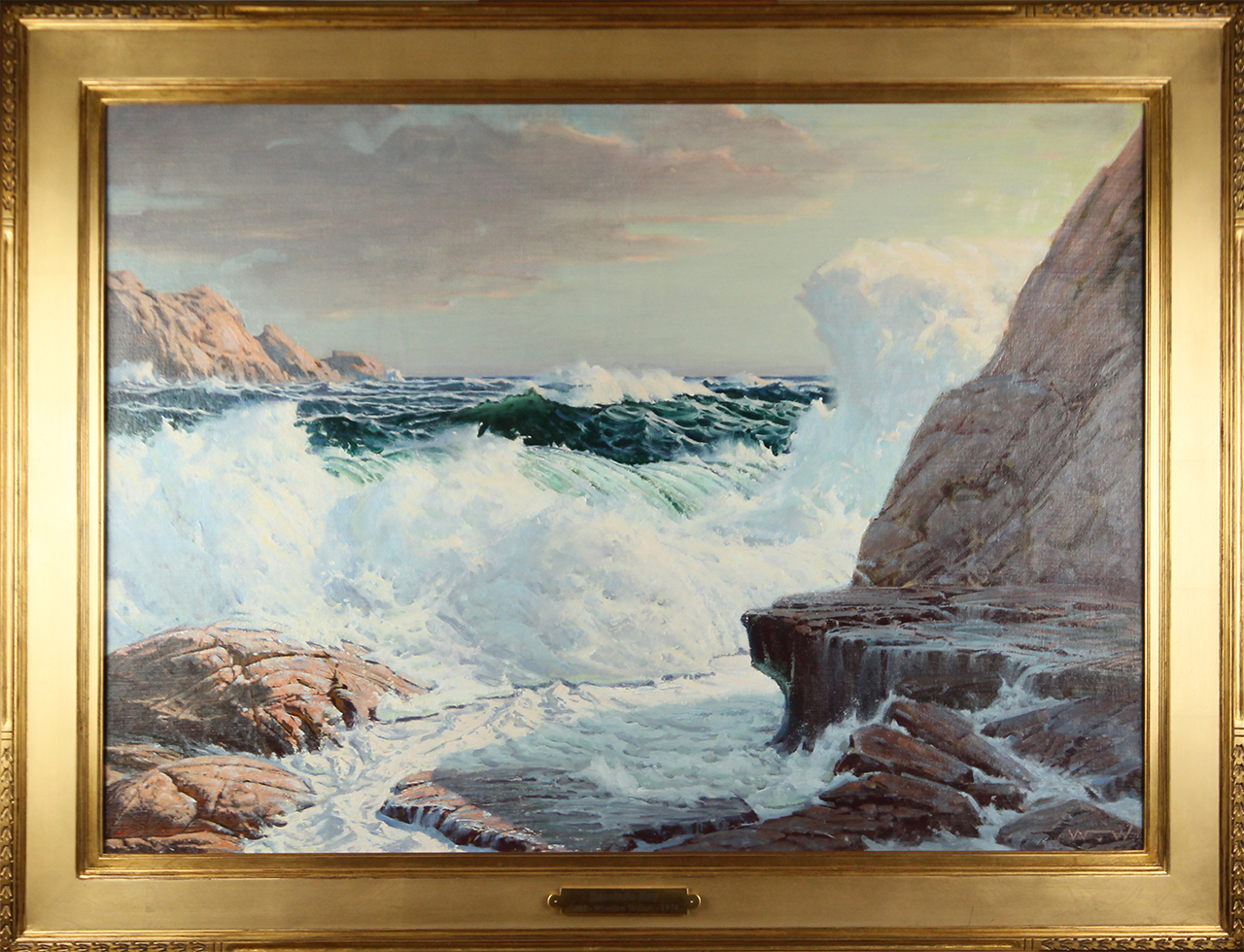
Desolato Bay

Wilson painted seascapes in his Rockport, Massachusetts studio. His seascapes were exhibited at Vose Gallery in Boston. In a letter dated January 24, 1991, Robert C. Vose Jr., of Vose Gallery, confirmed that the gallery “did give {Wilson} an exhibition in our galleries in Boston” and stated “We thought of {the paintings} of excellent quality, and much in the spirit of Frederick Waugh”. Eleanor Roosevelt chaired a one-man art show held in New York City entitled "Paintings of the Sea". On June 4, 1951, the First Lady, Eleanor Roosevelt “blogged” in her My Day report, that she had visited this exhibit, and she reported:

“In certain ones the light made one think of tropical climates; in others the shores of Maine seemed to stand out. More often the sky and the sea were stormy, but the light was nearly always breaking through. Let us hope that out of this turbulent period in history the light will break through for all human beings”.

== Gloucester ==
Under the pseudonym of Pico Miran painted in his Gloucester studio. Upon occasion, he would have a visitor, however the room in which he painted was never open. His post-modern art, or as he referred to it as "super-realistic", is replete with political and religious tones, and is highly reflective of the nuclear and mechanical themes of the period.

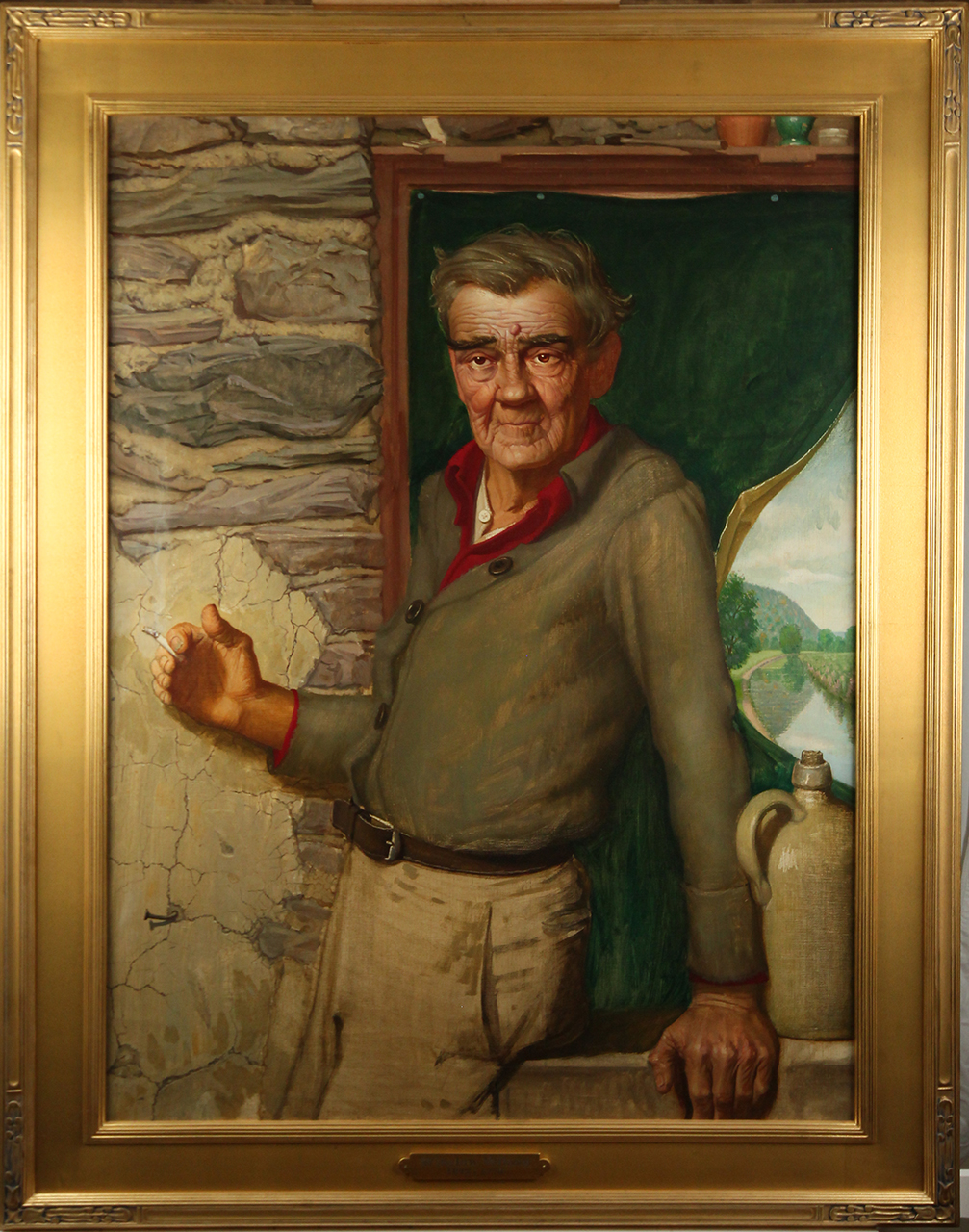

Wilson was a member of the Rockport Art Association from 1946 through 1972, and for many of those years he taught portraiture. His portraits have included local Gloucester residents and friends.

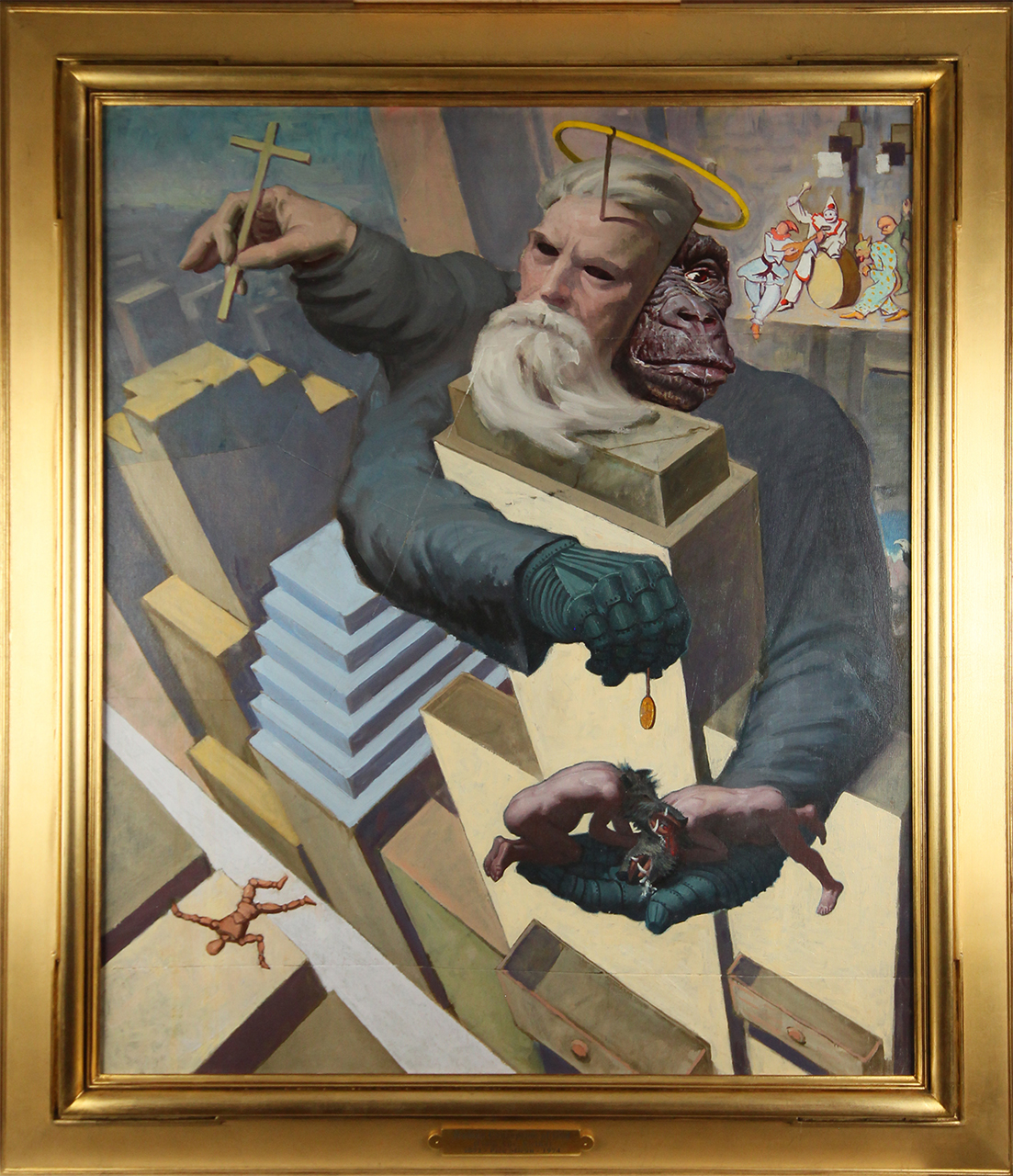
Human Conception of God (God, Ape, Swine)

Following Wilson's death in 1974, his long-term companion, Jane Grey (an accomplished portrait artist), gifted his paintings to his only son, Horace Peter Wilson. Those paintings remained stored in Kansas City until 2012, at which time the paintings were distributed to Wilson's grandchildren.

In 2014, Dave Rich, a Gloucester native, stated in a correspondence with Peter Anastas:

“...would take an interest in the precocious postmodernism of Pico Miran. His value lies in his theorizing postmodernity, and making the first forays into postmodern visual art — the seascapes were a virtuoso performance; Winslow was no less a character than Pico or Tex. In that sense he was a performance artist. A kind of Andy Kaufman who took personae and masks to the extreme. On this conceptual level, if explained as such, Wilson ought to be recovered; and could be recovered by an astute and enterprising curator.”

The paintings are in the process of being professionally restored and framed, and efforts are underway to showcase Wilson's paintings. A website exists with the roots of a biography about the artist, currently being documented and researched by Claudia Wilson Howard in conjunction with interested parties across the United States.
