= Thomas W. Cridler =

American U.S. Third Assistant Secretary of State

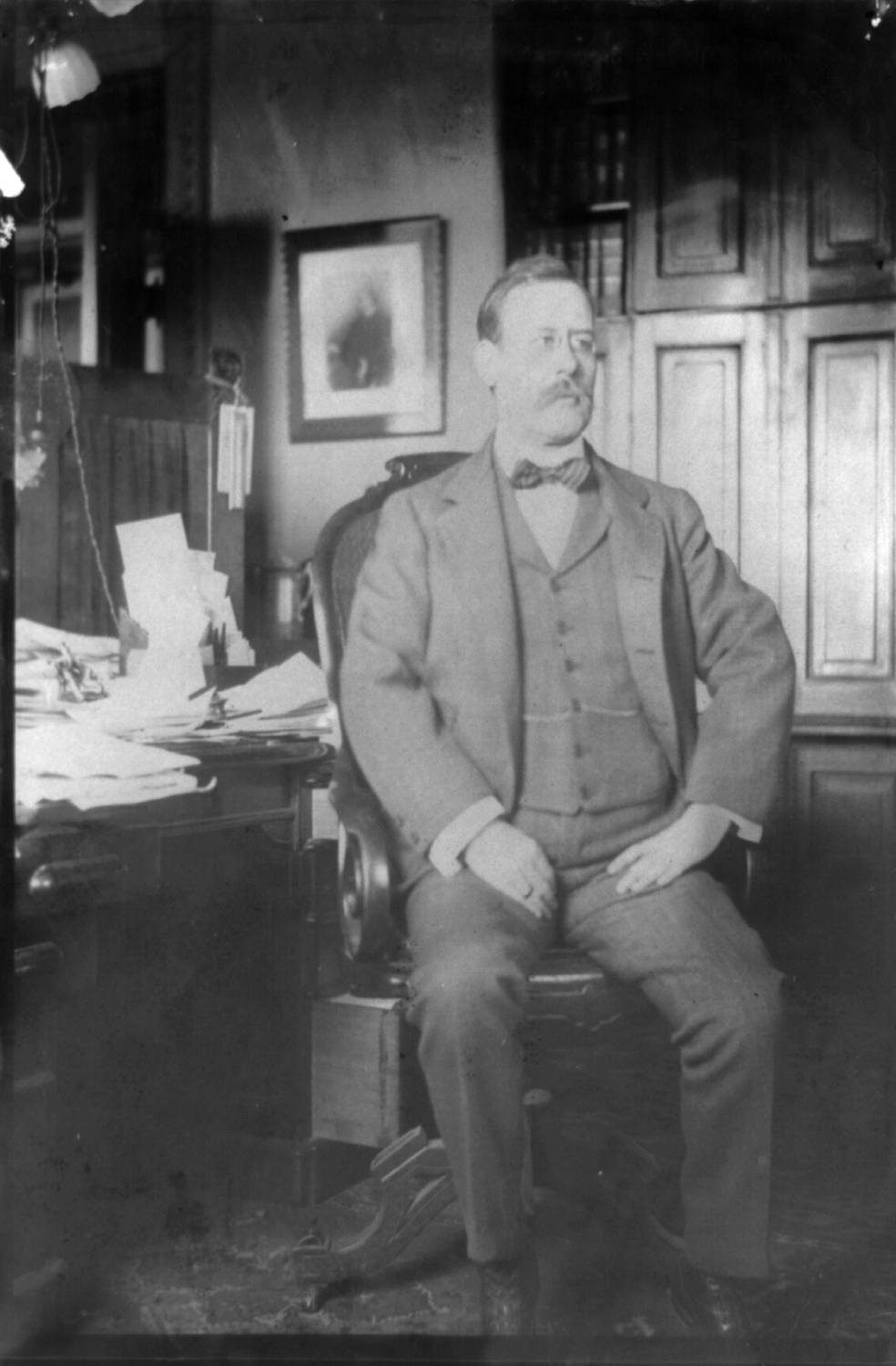
Cridler, c. 1900

Thomas Wilbur Cridler (1850–1914) was United States Third Assistant Secretary of State from 1897 to 1901.

== Biography ==
Thomas Wilbut Cridler was born in Harpers Ferry, Virginia on November 13, 1850. He was educated in Virginia, and Washington, D.C., where he studied law.

On July 1, 1875, Cridler joined the United States Department of State as a clerk. He rose steadily through the ranks of the State Department. He traveled to Europe several times on government business and served as the State Department's special disbursing officer at the International Monetary Conference held in Brussels on November 22, 1892.

In 1897, President of the United States William McKinley named Cridler Third Assistant Secretary of State, with Cridler subsequently holding this office from April 8, 1897 until November 15, 1901. In that capacity, he was present in Paris for the signing of the Treaty of Paris (1898). He was the U.S. Special Commissioner to the 1900 Paris Exhibition and wrote a special report to the United States Congress about the Exposition. During this visit, the Government of France made Cridler an officer of the Legion of Honour.

Upon his resignation from the State Department in 1901, Cridler became Commissioner for Europe for the Louisiana Purchase Exposition. In 1911, he became vice president of the Collin Armstrong Advertising Company.

Cridler died at his home in New York City on February 23, 1914.

== Works by Thomas W. Cridler ==
- Lincoln: A Typical American – An Address by Thomas W. Cridler at the Union League Club of Brooklyn, February 12, 1901

Government offices
| Preceded by William Woodward Baldwin | Third Assistant Secretary of State; April 8, 1897 – November 15, 1901 | Succeeded by Herbert H. D. Peirce |
