= William Woodward Baldwin =

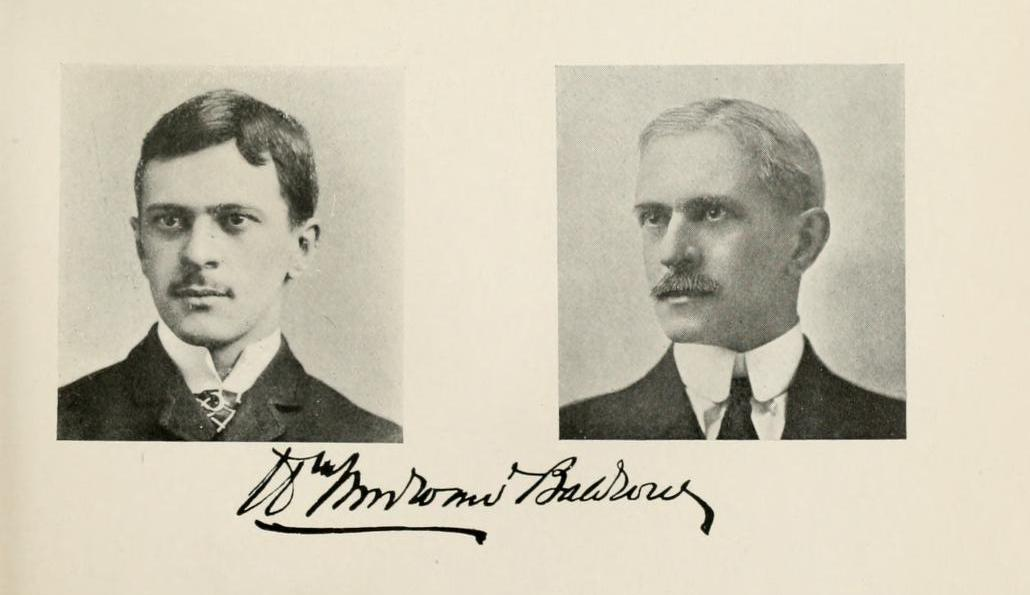
Photographs of Baldwin along with his signature

William Woodward Baldwin (June 23, 1862 – 1954) was a United States lawyer who served as Third Assistant Secretary of State from 1896 to 1897.

== Biography ==
William Woodward Baldwin was born on June 23, 1862, the son of Summerfield and Frances (Cugle) Baldwin. He was raised in Baltimore and studied at Phillips Exeter Academy from 1880 to 1882. He later attended Harvard College, graduating with a Bachelor of Arts degree in 1886, and the University of Maryland School of Law, receiving an LL.B. in 1888. His wife, the former Katherine Willard, was a niece of Frances Willard. Together, they had a son, Summerfield in 1897.

After law school, Baldwin moved to New York City, where he began to practice law, eventually as part of the law firm of Boston & Baldwin. In 1896, President of the United States Grover Cleveland selected Baldwin to be Third Assistant Secretary of State and Baldwin held this office from February 29, 1896 until April 1, 1897. After his time in office, Baldwin resumed the practice of law, settling in Briarcliff Manor, New York. He became a trustee of the Briarcliff Congregational Church, counsel to the village, and member of the district's board of education and Mount Pleasant Field Club.

Baldwin died on October 17, 1954, and is buried in the Baldwin Memorial Church in Millersville, Maryland.

== See also ==
- The Harvard Monthly

Government offices
| Preceded by William Woodville Rockhill | Third Assistant Secretary of State; February 29, 1896 – April 1, 1897 | Succeeded by Thomas W. Cridler |
