= Charles Hamilton Aide =

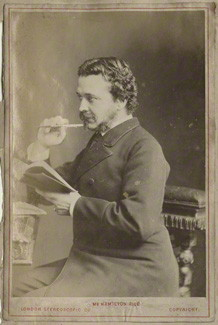
Charles Hamilton Aide

Charles Hamilton Aide (sometimes written as Aidé or Aïdé; 4 November 1826 – 13 December 1906) was "for many years a conspicuous figure in London literary society, a writer of novels, songs and dramas of considerable merit and popularity, and a skillful amateur artist". In particular, Aide was "known for such widely anthologized lyrics as 'Love, the Pilgrim', 'Lost and Found' and 'George Lee'".

== Biography ==
Aide was born in Paris, France. His father, a Greek exile, of good character, was killed in a duel when Aide was four years old. He was thereafter raised in England by his mother, who was the daughter of British Admiral George Collier. Aide attended the University of Bonn, then served in the British army seven years until 1853, attaining the rank of captain. He was an acquaintance to English novelist Elizabeth Gaskell. In a 1858 letter to publisher George Smith, she described him as such:

A gentleman, who is rather more than an acquaintance & less than a friend has asked me for an introduction to you, with a view of submitting a MS, (nature unknown,) to you. I have ventured to give it, & I shall be much obliged to you if you will ‘honour’ it. His name is Hamilton Aide. His mother was a rich Scottish heiress, his father a Greek exile, of good character; Mr Aide, pere, is dead; the son lives with his mother now, has been a captain in some rather crack regiment, but is now living in Hampshire, All that I know of him is that he & his mother have shown us great kindness in Paris & Rome; that he acts beautifully in French or English private theatricals, sings enchantingly (you could not transact your business with him in a duett, could you? Without any disparagement to your possible musical talents I think you would be a gainer by any mode of hearing him sing,) draws passably – and is altogether full of tastes – about the talents I am not so sure

— Elizabeth Gaskell

A homosexual bachelor, Aide lived in Lyndhurst with his mother. After her death in 1875, he then "took rooms at Queen Anne's Gate where he hosted a celebrated salon which drew 'the chief figures in the social and artistic world of France as well as England'". He was one of the male companions of Henry James, who characterised him as "the Diane de Poitiers of our time".

He died in London, leaving his papers to Morton Fullerton.

== Legacy ==
His entry in the Dictionary of National Biography sets forth that Aide was:

[A] man of versatile accomplishments and with abundant social gifts, who devoted himself with equal success to society, music, art, and literature.' He wrote several volumes of poetry, composed songs, exhibited the sketches made on his regular foreign travels at various galleries. He wrote nineteen novels dealing with fashionable society which 'enjoyed some vogue'. His drama Philip was produced with Irving in the lead at the Lyceum in 1874 and his comedy A Nine Days' Wonder was produced by John Hare and the Kendals at the Court Theatre in 1875.

Aide left his papers to American author Morton Fullerton, then a correspondent for The Times in their Paris office, with open-ended instructions "to manipulate, to publish, or to burn as you think fit". His estate was sworn at £43,000 gross. His remaining literary copyrights were bequeathed to Lady Stanley.

== Works ==
- Rita: An Autobiography (1858)
- Confidences (1859)
- Carr of Carrlyon (1862)
- Mr. and Mrs. Faulconbridge (1864)
- The Marstons (1868)
- In That State of Life (1871)
- Morals and Mysteries (1872)
- Penruddocke (1873)
- A Nine Days' Wonder: A Novelette (1875)
- Poet and Peer (1880)
- Introduced to Society (1884)
- Passages in the Life of a Lady, 1814-1815-1816 (1887)
- The Cliff Mystery (1888)
- A Voyage of Discovery: A Novel of American Society (1892)
- Elizabeth's Pretenders (1895)
- Jane Treachel (1899)
- The Snares of the World (1901)
- Dr Bill, three-act farce adapted from the French Le Docteur Jo-Jo of Albert Carré
