= Philip Henry Savage =

American poet

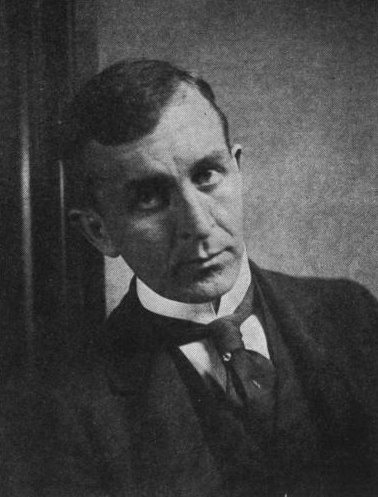
Philip Henry Savage, from the winter before his death

Philip Henry Savage (February 11, 1868 – June 4, 1899) was an American poet.

== Biography ==
Born in North Brookfield, Massachusetts on February 11, 1868, he was the son of Minot Judson Savage, a well-known Unitarian minister, and Ella A. Dodge. The family moved several times during his early life: to Framingham, then to Chicago and finally to Boston in 1874. He graduated from the English High School of Boston in 1885. He worked at the leather and shoe company Bachfelder and Lincoln, spending "a number of years drumming boots and shoes in the northeastern states" before he began attending Harvard in 1889 at age 21. He graduated there in 1893, and was conferred the degree of A.M. in 1896. During his time there, he edited The Harvard Monthly for three years, as well as editing a bi-weekly literary periodical, The Mahogany Tree, which was published out of Boston. After spending a year (1893-1894) at the Harvard Divinity School, he became an English instructor in Harvard's English department, and was able to publish his first volume of poems, First Poems and Fragments, in 1895.

Refusing a position as an English instructor at the Massachusetts Institute of Technology, he began work at the Boston Public Library as Secretary to the Librarian (who was, at the time, Herbert Putnam), becoming a Clerk of the Corporation in 1899. On May 31, 1899, he was stricken with appendicitis, and after a weeklong illness, he died on June 4 at Massachusetts General Hospital. In 1901, his collected poems were posthumously edited and released by his friend, well-known composer and musicologist, Daniel Gregory Mason, as the Poems of Philip Henry Savage. Mason praised Savage for "delicate idealism." Savage's nature poetry won the most praise from critics of his time. He was a close friend of another Harvard poet, William Vaughn Moody, with whom he entered Harvard in 1889. Savage is often linked with a group known as the Harvard poets (or the Harvard Pessimists), many of whom died young (such as Trumbull Stickney, George Cabot Lodge, Thomas Parker Sanborn, and Hugh McCulloch).

== Bibliography ==
- First Poems and Fragments (1895)
- Poems (1898)
- The Poems of Philip Henry Savage (1900)
