= Julia Cooley Altrocchi =

American author and poet

- Born: July 4, 1883; Seymour, Connecticut, US
- Died: November 23, 1972 (aged 89); Berkeley, California, US

Julia Cooley Altrocchi (July 4, 1893 - November 23, 1972) was an American author and poet, who wrote many works for children and adults, including The Poems of a Child, The Dance of Youth, Snow Covered Wagons, and Wolves Against the Moon.

== Life ==
She was born in 1893 in Seymour, Connecticut, to Harlan Cooley and Nellie Wooster Cooley, and then was raised in Chicago, Illinois. She graduated from University High School in Chicago, and then from Vassar College in 1914. She married Rudolph Altrocchi in 1920. The couple moved to the San Francisco Bay Area in 1928 upon the latter's appointment as Professor and Chair of the Italian Department at the University of California, Berkeley; Julia resided in Berkeley until her death in 1972. The couple had two sons, John Cooley and Paul Hemenway. She is buried at Sunset View Cemetery in El Cerrito, California.

Altrocchi was a member of the California Writers Club.

== Works ==
- The Poems of a Child: Being Poems Written Between the Ages of Six and Ten, 1904
- The Dance of Youth: And Other Poems, 1917
- The Forgotten Etruscans, 1927
- Scenes at Canossa, 1935
- Snow-Covered Wagons, 1936
- Wolves Against the Moon, 1940
- The Old California Trail: Traces in Folklore and Furrow, 1945
- The Spectacular San Franciscans, 1949
- Ships and Spears in Genoa, 1959
- Girl with Ocelot: And Other Poems, 1964
- The Golden Wheel: A Collection of Poetry, 2007 (edited by Paul Hemenwey Altrocchi)
- Venom and Laughter: A Colleen Copes with Anti-Irish Prejudice, with Paul Hemenwey Altrocchi (co-authored and edited after death of Julia), 2012
- Fraught with Hazard, with Paul Hemenwey Altrocchi (co-authored and edited after death of Julia), 2015
