= Hugh McCulloch (poet) =

American poet

Hugh McCulloch, from a portrait by Stephen Hills Parker

Hugh McCulloch (March 9, 1869 – March 27, 1902) was an American poet. Born in Fort Wayne, Indiana, on March 2, 1869. He was the grandson of Hugh McCulloch who was Secretary of the Treasury under Presidents Lincoln, Johnson, and later Arthur. He attended Harvard University and served as an English assistant there from 1892 to 1894. He later went abroad to devote himself to his literary work. Inspired by the Pre-Raphaelites and decadents, his verse was praised for its "careful technique and reserve power." His first volume, the Quest of Heracles and Other Poems, was published in 1893. He died on March 27, 1902, in Florence, Italy, shortly before he would have turned 33. Soon after, a volume of his last poems, composed while in Florence, Written in Florence: the Last Verses of Hugh McCulloch, was published. McCulloch was a member of a group of Harvard poets, described by George Santayana as having been "alone against the world", who died young, including George Cabot Lodge, Trumbull Stickney, Thomas Parker Sanborn and Philip Henry Savage.

== See also ==
- The Harvard Monthly

== Bibliography ==
- The Quest of Heracles and Other Poems (1893)
- Written in Florence: The Last Verses of Hugh McCulloch (1902)
