= Marion Mainwaring =

American writer, translator, and critic (1922–2015)

Marion Jessie Mainwaring (April 21, 1922 – December 12, 2015) was an American writer, translator, and critic.

Mainwaring is best known as the author who completed Edith Wharton's novel The Buccaneers, published in 1993. She earlier assisted R. W. B. Lewis in researching his Pulitzer- and Bancroft-prize-winning 1976 biography of Wharton.

She wrote the novels Murder in Pastiche: or Nine Detectives All at Sea (1954), parodying nine famous fictional detectives, and Murder at Midyears (1953), based on her experiences in teaching at Mount Holyoke College. She translated Youth and Age: Three Novellas by Ivan Turgenev and edited The Portrait Game, records of a parlor game played by Turgenev and his friends. Her last major work was Mysteries of Paris: The Quest for Morton Fullerton (2001), a biography of Wharton's lover.

She graduated from Simmons College (BA) and Harvard University (PhD).
