= John Hall Wheelock =

American poet (1886–1978)

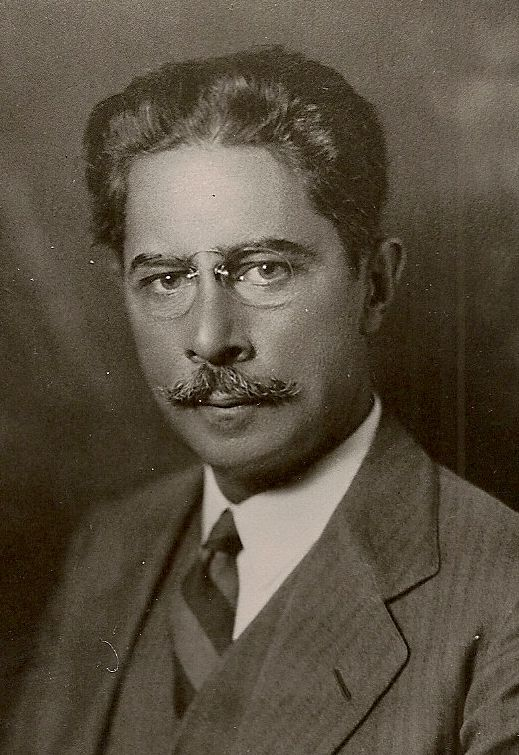
John Hall Wheelock in 1936

John Hall Wheelock (September 9, 1886 – March 22, 1978) was an American poet. A descendant of Eleazar Wheelock, founder of Dartmouth College, his parents were William Efner Wheelock and Emily Charlotte Hall, John Hall Wheelock was born in Far Rockaway, New York, and brought up in the neighborhood now occupied by Rockefeller Center. He summered in a family home on Long Island's South Fork, which provided inspiration for much of his work.

Wheelock's parents encouraged the reading and memorization of poetry, and told of the time when they had seen the great poet Walt Whitman, when John was a baby.

My father held me up on a ferryboat...and said: 'Do you see that man?' He turned my head... toward Whitman, who was standing in the bow of the boat, and he said, 'That is the great poet, Walt Whitman.' Apparently—as my father described it—I refused to look at him, and kept turning my head the other way. I have no memory of this great occasion, not being then equipped to receive the spirit of Walt Whitman, although I suppose for a moment his image was in my eyes.

John Hall Wheelock graduated from Harvard University in 1908, and was class poet. As a student, he was editor-in-chief of The Harvard Monthly, and published his first work, Verses by Two Undergraduates, anonymously with his friend Van Wyck Brooks during their freshman year. In 1910, he began work with Charles Scribner and Sons and by 1947 had risen to the position of senior editor. During his career he worked with such distinguished authors as Thomas Wolfe and James Truslow Adams and is noted for discovering poets May Swenson and James Dickey.

Wheelock's published volume of Collected Works was awarded the Golden Rose by the New England Poetry Society in 1936, as the most distinguished contribution to American poetry of that year. For his work Poems Old and New he received the Ridgely Torrence Memorial Award in 1956, and the Borestone Mountain Poetry Award in 1957. In 1962 he won the Bollingen Prize; in 1965 the Signet Society Medal, Harvard University, for distinguished achievement in the arts. In 1972 he was awarded the Gold Medal by the Poetry Society of America for notable achievement in poetry.

...so often a great poem is just sheer good luck because the language permits certain effects to be made by someone with long discipline in the use of language, who has a flash in which the words and ideas just fall in a particular way.

John Hall Wheelock was a member of the American Academy of Arts and Letters, Poetry Society of America (Vice president, 1944-1946), National Institute of Arts and Letters (vice-president), and the Academy of American Poets (chancellor, 1947–71; honorary fellow, 1974-1978). He was an honorary consultant in American letters to the Library of Congress.

In 1940, John Hall Wheelock married Phyllis E. DeKay, the daughter of Charles DeKay, poet and art critic.

Certain things will start a poem in you. It could be something no more important than the sound a broken radiator makes in a room, the knocking of water against pipes, or a murmuring sound, a steady sound . . . the sound of grasshoppers and cicadas in the autumn in the countryside . . . these things will start the feeling of a poem, though the poet doesn’t know what’s coming or what it’s going to be.

== Works ==
- Verses by Two Undergraduates
- The human fantasy. Sherman, French. 1911. "John Hall Wheelock."
- The belovéd adventure. Sherman, French. 1912. "John Hall Wheelock."
- Love and Liberation. Sherman, French. 1913. "John Hall Wheelock."
- Dust and Light. Scribner. 1919. "John Hall Wheelock."
- The Black Panther. Scribner. 1922. "John Hall Wheelock."
- The Bright Doom, Scribner, 1927
- Collected Poems, 1911-1936, Scribner, 1936
- Editor to Author: The Letters of Maxwell E. Perkins, 1950. (editor)
- Poems Old and New, Scribner, 1956
- The Gardner and Other Poems, Scribner, 1961
- What is Poetry?, Scribner, 1963
- Dear Men and Women: New Poems, Scribner, 1966
- By Daylight and in Dream: New and Collected Poems, 1904-1970, Scribner, 1970
- In Love and Song: Poems, Scribner, 1971.
- Nirvana
