= Minot Judson Savage =

American poet

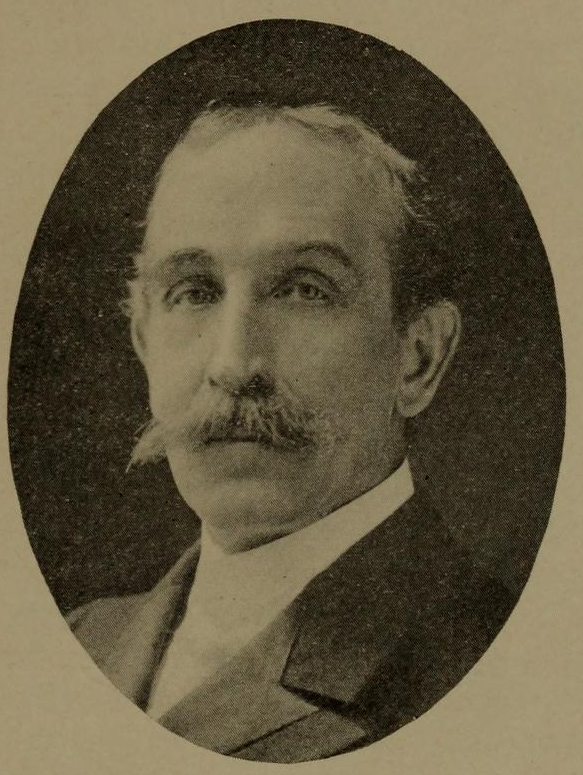
Minot Judson Savage

Minot Judson Savage (June 10, 1841 – May 22, 1918) was an American Unitarian minister, psychical researcher and author.

== Biography ==
Savage was born in Norridgewock, Maine in 1841. He graduated from the Bangor Theological Seminary in 1864, and for nine years was in the Congregational ministry, being a home missionary at San Mateo and Grass Valley, California, until 1867. He held pastorates at Framingham, Massachusetts from 1867 to 1869, and at Hannibal, Missouri from 1869 to 1873.

Savage then became a Unitarian, and was pastor of the Third Unitarian Church of Chicago from 1873 to 1874, of the Church of the Unity in Boston from 1874 to 1896, and of the Church of the Messiah (now renamed the Community Church) in New York City from 1896 to 1906. He was an active advocate of Darwinian evolutionistic optimism and social reform, and also preached a spiritualistic faith in personal survival after death. His sermons were distributed in the pamphlets Unity Pulpit and Messiah Pulpit.

He was a director of the American Unitarian Association, and served on several councils and conferences. In 1896 he was granted an honorary doctor of divinity degree from Harvard University in 1896.

His son, Philip Henry Savage, worked as a librarian at the Boston Public Library, and won praise for his own work as a poet.

== Publications ==
- Christianity, the Science of Manhood (1873)
- The Religion of Evolution (1876)
- The Morals of Evolution (1880)
- Beliefs About Man (1884)
- The Religious Life (1885)
- My Creed (1887)
- Religious Reconstruction (1888)
- The Evolution of Christianity (1892)
- Psychics: Facts and Theories (1893)
- Our Unitarian Gospel (1898)
- The Passing and the Permanent in Religion (1901)
- Life Beyond Death (1901)
- Can Telepathy Explain? (1902)
- America to England (1905)
- Life's Dark Problems (1905)
- Immortality (1906)
