= Edward Rowland Sill =

19th-century American poet and educator

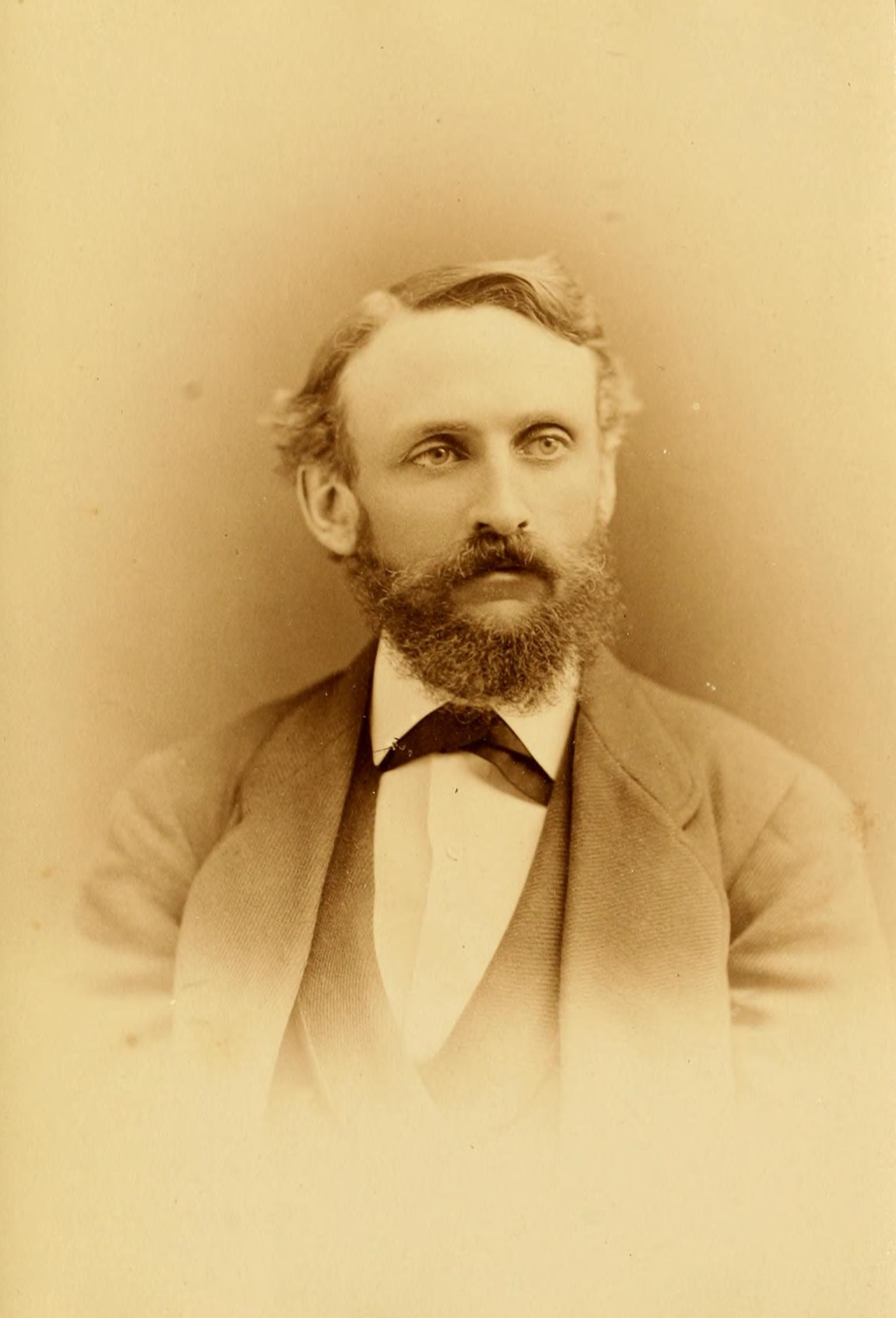
- Born: April 29, 1841; Windsor, Connecticut
- Died: February 27, 1887 (aged 45); Cleveland, Ohio
- Occupations: Poet, educator

Edward Rowland Sill (April 29, 1841 – February 27, 1887) was an American poet and educator.

== Biography ==
Born in Windsor, Connecticut, he graduated from Yale in 1861, where he was Class Poet and a member of Skull and Bones. He engaged in business in California, and entered the Harvard Divinity School in 1867 but soon left for a position on the staff of the New York Evening Mail. After teaching at Wadsworth and Cuyahoga Falls, Ohio (1868–1871), he became principal of Oakland High School in Oakland, California.

From 1874 to 1882, Sill was professor of English literature at the University of California. His health failing, he returned to Cuyahoga Falls in 1883. He devoted himself to literary work, abundant and largely anonymous, until his death in 1887 in Cleveland, Ohio.

In 1904 Mount Sill, a peak in the Sierra Nevada mountain range in California and the state's sixth-highest mountain, was named for him by noted mountaineer Joseph LeConte.

== Works ==
Much of his poetry was contributed to The Atlantic Monthly, the Century Magazine, and the Overland Monthly. Many of his prose essays appeared in The Contributors Club, and others appeared in the main body of the Atlantic. Among his works are:

- A translation of Rau's Mozart (1868).
- The Hermitage and Other Poems (1868).
- Opportunity (1880)
- The Venus of Milo and Other Poems (1883), a farewell tribute to his California friends.
- Poems (1887).
- The Hermitage and Later Poems (1889). 1892 reprint
- Hermione and Other Poems (1899).
- "The prose of Edward Rowland Sill" (1900).
- The Poems of Edward Rowland Sill (1902).

A memorial volume was privately printed by his friends in 1887. A biographical sketch in The Poetical Works of Edward Rowland Sill, edited by William Belmont Parker with Mrs Sill's assistance was printed in 1906, and his poem "The Fool's Prayer" (1879) was selected for inclusion in the Yale Book of American Verse in 1912.

Sill was the subject of biographies by William Belmont Parker in 1915 and by Alfred Riggs Ferguson in 1955. According to the Encyclopædia Britannica Eleventh Edition, "He was a modest and charming man, a graceful essayist, a sure critic. His contribution to American poetry is small but of fine quality. His best poems, such as The Venus of Milo, The Fool's Prayer and Opportunity, gave him a high place among the minor poets of America, which might have been higher but for his early death."
