= William Jones (anthropologist) =

American linguist

- Megasiáwa
- Born: March 28, 1871; Oklahoma, United States
- Died: March 29, 1909 (aged 38); Luzon, Philippines
- Cause of death: Altercation during fieldwork
- Resting place: Manila North Cemetery
- Education: Harvard University (BA) Columbia University (PhD)
- Occupation: Linguistic anthropologist

William Jones (March 28, 1871– March 29, 1909), also called Megasiáwa (Black Eagle), was a Native American anthropologist of the Meskwaki nation. Jones was born in Indian Territory (now part of Oklahoma) on March 28, 1871. After studying at Hampton Institute, he graduated from Phillips Academy and went on to receive his B.A. from Harvard. At Columbia University, he studied under Franz Boas, and in 1904, Jones became the fourth person to receive a PhD in linguistic anthropology, twelfth person to receive a PhD in anthropology, and first Native American to receive a PhD in anthropology.

Jones is known as a specialist in Algonquian languages, particularly known for his extensive collection of Algonquian texts. In 1908, while employed as an assistant curator at the Field Museum, he went to the Philippines to do fieldwork.

== Early life ==
William Jones was born to Henry Clay Jones and Sarah Penny Jones on March 28, 1871. His ethnicity is a mix of Meskwaki, Welsh, and English. Jones' mother, Sarah, died when he was an infant. From the age of one to nine, Jones lived in a wigwam where his maternal grandmother and medicine woman, Kitiqua, took care of him. Jones' great-grandfather, Kitiqua's father, named Wa-shi-ho-wa, taught Jones the tradition, language, and customs of their Meskwaki ancestors.

Jones attended two of the more than 400 American Indian boarding schools that were dedicated to removing indigenous cultural heritage. When he was ten, Jones was taken to the Indian school at Newton, Kansas. Later, he was taken to White's Indiana Manual Labor Institute that was run by Quaker missionaries in Wabash, Indiana. After leaving them, he worked as a cowhand in Indian Territory.

== Career ==
At 18 years old, he went to Hampton Institute, where he was considered a prize pupil. There, he and other indigenous children joined black students for their education. After Hampton, he attended the Phillips Academy at Andover, Massachusetts, a predominantly white school.

In 1896, Jones went to Harvard, where he wrote for and was editor for The Harvard Monthly; studied the Sauk and Meskwaki near Tama, Iowa; and received his A.B degree. He then continued his studies at Columbia University where he held a fellowship and later became an assistant in anthropology. In the summer of 1900, Jones went to study the Sauk and Meskwaki of the upper Mississippi, under the direction of his Columbia mentor Franz Boas, who said to benefactors “the work must be pushed more energetically on account of the rapid disappearance of the material.”

Once Jones received his PhD from Columbia in 1904, he commenced investigations along the northern Algonquian tribes. Jones wrote short stories about Native Americans and the American West, magazine articles, and gave lectures.

== Fieldwork in the Philippines and death ==
Jones was unable to find a permanent position working on Algonquian languages due to bias against Native Americans. As a result, he accepted an offer from the Field Museum to gather information and articles about the Ilongot people (now called the Bugkalot) of the Philippines.

At the age of 38, Jones was killed on March 29, 1909, at Dumobato on the east side of Luzon in an altercation with some of the Ilongot among whom he was engaged in fieldwork. It is debatable as to whether or not his death was actually a murder, as his diary entries and correspondences in the last months of his life revealed feelings of peace and belonging with the Ilongot people. He was also valued within their community for his skills as a medical practitioner. Within a few weeks following the event of his death, the United States burned twenty Ilongot villages in retaliation.

== Publications ==
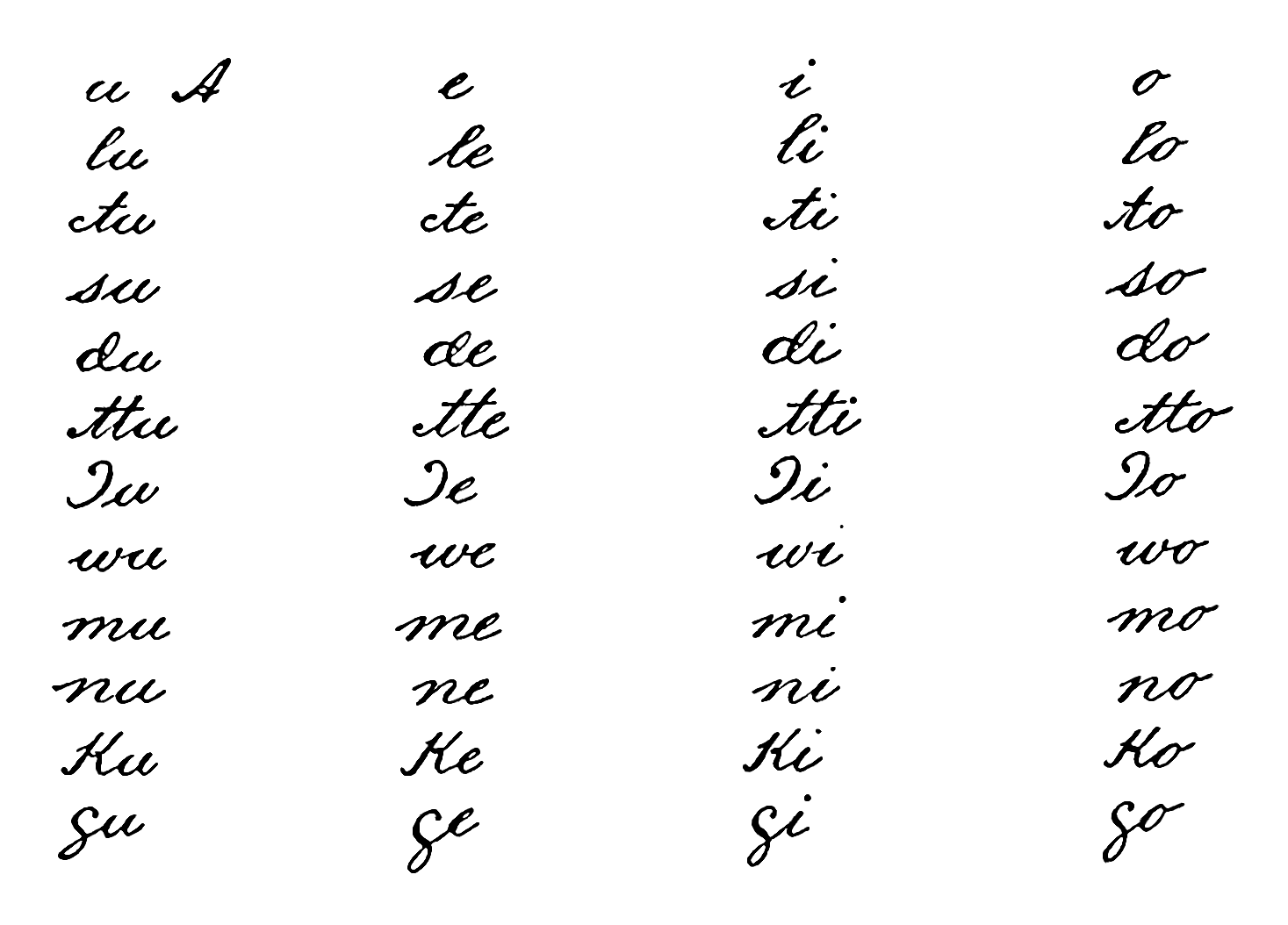
- The letters of Great Lakes Algonquian, as described by Jones
  Jones, William, "Frederic Remington's Pictures of Frontier Life”, The Harvard Monthly, Vol. 27 No. 5, February 1899, 186–190.
- Jones, William, “An Episode of the Spring Round-Up”, The Harvard Monthly, Vol. 28 No. 2, April 1899, 46–53.
- Jones, William, “Anoska Nimiwina”, The Harvard Monthly, Vol. 28 No. 3, May 1899, 102–111.
- Jones, William, “Lydie”, The Harvard Monthly, Vol. 28 No. 5, July 1899, 194–201.
- Jones, William, “Chiky”, The Harvard Monthly, Vol. 29 No. 2, November 1899, 59–65.
- Jones, William, “In the Name of His Ancestor”, The Harvard Monthly, Vol. 29 No. 3, December 1899, 109–115.
- Jones, William, “The Heart of the Brave”, The Harvard Monthly, Vol. 30 No. 3, May 1900, 99–106.
- Jones, William, “A Lone Star Ranger”, The Harvard Monthly, Vol. 30 No. 4, June 1900, 154–161.
- Jones, William, “Episodes in the Culture-Hero Myth of the Sauks and Foxes [The Culture-Hero Tradition of the Sauk and Fox]”, Journal of American Folk-Lore, Vol. XIV, October–December, 1901, 225–239.
- Jones, William, “Some Principles of Algonquian Word-Formation”, American Anthropologist, New Series, Vol. VI, no. 3, Supplement, 1904. This is Jones' doctoral thesis at Columbia.
- Jones, William, “The Algonkin Manitou [The Concept of the Manitou]”, Journal of American Folk-Lore, Vol. XVIII, July–September, 1905, 183–190.
- Jones, William, “Central Algonquin”, Annual Archaeological Report, Toronto, Canada, 1905.
- Jones, William, “Ojibwa ethnographic and linguistic field notes”, Archival material at unspecified location, either American Museum of Natural History, Carnegie Institute, Smithsonian, or Field Museum, 1903–1905.
- Jones, William, “An Algonquin Syllabary”, Boas Anniversary Volume (New York, G.E. Stechert),1906, 88–93.
- Jones, William, “Mortuary Observances and the Adoption Rites of the Algonkin Foxes of Iowa”, Congrès International des Américanistes, Quebec, 1906, 1907.
- Jones, William, “Fox Texts”, Publications of the American Ethnological Society, Leyden, E.J. Brill, Vol. I, 1907, 383 pages.
- Jones, William, “Notes on the Fox Indians”, Journal of American Folk-Lore, vol. 24, April–June 1911.
- Jones, William, “Algonquian (Fox), an Illustrative Sketch”, Handbook of American Indian Languages, Bureau of American Ethnology (Boas), Bulletin 40, Pt. 1, 1911, 735–874.
- Jones, William, and Truman Michelson. Kickapoo tales. Leyden: E.J. Brill, 1915.
- Jones, William, and Truman Michelson. “Ojibwa texts collected by William Jones”. Publications of the American Ethnological Society, Vol. VII—Part I. Leyden: E.J. Brill, 1917.
- Jones, William, and Truman Michelson. “Ojibwa texts collected by William Jones”. Publications of the American Ethnological Society, Vol. VII—Part II. Leyden: New York: G.E. Stechert & Co., Agents, 1919.
- Fisher, Margaret Welpley, “William Jones’ ‘Ethnography of the Fox Indians’”, doctoral dissertation, Smithsonian Institution Bureau of American Ethnology, Bulletin 125, Philadelphia, 1939. This is based on Jones’ secret, sealed manuscript, edited by Fisher. “The Iowa Foxes initiated him into many ancient mysteries of their religion, which have never been disclosed to a white man. Jones committed to paper an account of these, with sketches, diagrams and the full interpretation which probably no other man could have supplied. The document he then sealed. It will not be opened until the older Indians have gone to their fathers, taking their lore with them.”
- Jones, William, “The Diary of William Jones: 1907-1909, Robert F. Cummings Philippine Expedition”, Dumabato, Isabela Province, Luzon, Philippines, The Field Museum of Chicago.
- Overholt, T. W., Callicott, J. B., & Jones, W. "Clothed-in-fur, and other tales: an introduction to an Ojibwa world view." Washington, D.C., University Press of America, 1982.

== Bibliography ==
- Bloomfield, Leonard (1922) "The Owl Sacred Pack of the Fox Indians" The American Journal of Philology 43(3): 276-281
- Hall, Robert L., "William Jones: American Indian Anthropologist and Martyr", Proc. of the 92nd annual meeting of the American Anthropological Association, 17-21 Nov., Washington, DC, 1993.
- Hampton Normal and Agricultural Institution, “William Jones (Megasiawa, Black Eagle)”, Hampton Normal and Agricultural Institution Catalog, copy in Peabody Museum x-file 47-66.
- Jones, William 1900，Harvard Bulletin, April 14, 1909, 4.
- Jones, William 1900, Harvard Bulletin, 16 Oct., 1912.
- Peabody Museum, “Correspondence, photos and clippings about William Jones”, Peabody Museum archival collection, Harvard University, PM x-file 47-66 and 47-66A.
- Wissler, Clark, “Obituary of Dr. Jones”, The American Museum Journal, Volume IX, Number 5, May 1909, 123.
- Van Stone, James W., Mesquakie (Fox) material culture: the William Jones and Frederick Starr collections, Field Museum of Natural History, Chicago, 1998.
- William Jones, The Journal of American Folk-Lore, Vol. XXII, 1909, 262.
