= William Morton Fullerton =

American journalist

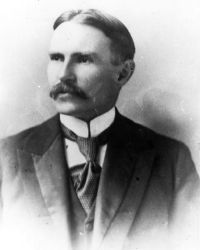
- Born: 18 September 1865; Norwich, Connecticut, United States
- Died: 26 August 1952 (aged 86); Paris, France
- Other name: Morton Fullerton
- Occupation: Print journalist
- Known for: His affair with award-winning author Edith Wharton and work with The Times

William Morton Fullerton (18 September 1865 – 26 August 1952) was an American print journalist, author and foreign correspondent for The Times. Today he is best known for having a mid-life affair with Pulitzer Prize-winning author Edith Wharton.

== Career ==
William Morton Fullerton was born in Norwich, Connecticut on 18 September 1865. He was a graduate of Phillips Academy in Andover, Massachusetts and studied at Harvard. He received his Bachelor of Arts in 1886. While studying at Harvard, he and classmates began The Harvard Monthly.

After his graduation and first trip to Europe in 1888, he spent several years working as a journalist in the Boston Area. In 1890, four years after his graduation from Harvard, Fullerton moved to France to begin work for The Times office in Paris. He eventually became the chief foreign correspondent, and remained with The Times. He remained there until 1910, leaving to try his hand at freelance journalism. He authored several books and numerous articles and served as an officer during World War I. Later, Fullerton joined the staff of Le Figaro, where he remained until his death in 1952.

It was Fullerton's extensive knowledge of the world of publishing that led him to assist author Edith Wharton (with whom, at the time, he was involved) in publishing the French translation of her classic novel The House of Mirth, through a well-known magazine.

== Personal life ==
Morton has been described as "Singularly attaching… a dashing well-tailored man with large Victorian moustache and languid eyes, a bright flower in his button hole, and the style of a 'masher'."

After graduating, he was intimate with George Santayana and close to Bernard Berenson. Upon moving to London he befriended Hamilton Aidé and became the lover of Lord Ronald Gower.

From 1906 to 1909, he was famously involved in an affair with American Pulitzer Prize–winning author Edith Wharton. They met in the summer of that year after being introduced by mutual friend Henry James. She undoubtedly considered him the love of her life, describing him as her "ideal intellectual partner". However they were never "officially" together, as Wharton was already married and Fullerton's highly promiscuous personality prevented him from ever committing to a serious relationship.

After the affair ended, Wharton, who was fiercely guarded when it came to her private life, requested that Fullerton destroy every letter she had ever sent him in order to avoid any scandal. The affair itself, although suspected, was not confirmed until the 1980s. Fullerton had ignored Wharton's request and had kept all of her letters, which were eventually published as a book, The Letters of Edith Wharton, in 1988. The affair probably helped inspire an erotic fragment for Beatrice Palmato, a novel that Wharton outlined but did not pursue, given that the incestuous father-daughter relationship at its core would make it unpublishable.

He was also engaged to his half cousin Katharine Fullerton Gerould, but the engagement was called off when Fullerton postponed the wedding. Katharine, sick of waiting, went on to marry another man and become a successful author in her own right. Around the same time he was engaged to Katharine and also involved with Wharton, Fullerton lived with an older woman named Mme Mirecourt, in Paris, but the affair ended disastrously and Fullerton was left owing her a great deal of money.

Morton also had a long affair with the Ranee of Sarawak, Margaret Brooke.

A biography, Mysteries of Paris: The Quest for Morton Fullerton, was published in 2001 by Marion Mainwaring.
