= Scofield Thayer =

American poet (1889–1982)

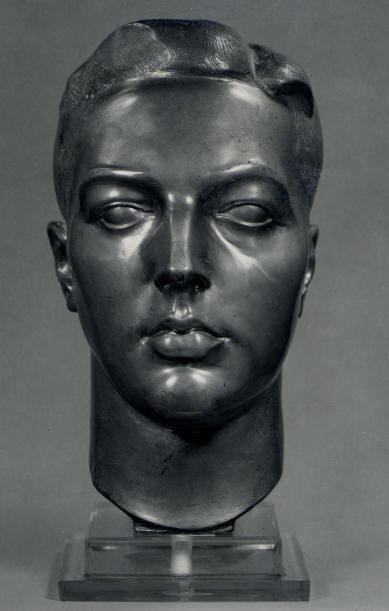
- Gaston Lachaise, Portrait of Scofield Thayer, modeled 1923–24; cast February 1/June 13, 1924, Metropolitan Museum of Art
- Born: December 12, 1889; Worcester, Massachusetts, U.S.
- Died: July 9, 1982 (aged 92); Edgartown, Massachusetts, U.S.
- Education: Harvard University
- Occupations: Poet; publisher
- Years active: 1918–1937
- Spouse: Elaine Orr (m. 1916, divorced)

Scofield Thayer (December 12, 1889 – July 9, 1982) was a wealthy American poet and publisher, best known for his art collection, now at the Metropolitan Museum of Art, and as a publisher and editor of the literary magazine The Dial during the 1920s. He published many emerging American and European writers.

== Early life and education ==
Thayer was born in Worcester, Massachusetts on December 12, 1889 to Edward D. Thayer and Florence (née Scofield) Thayer. The Thayers were a prominent and wealthy Massachusetts family. Scofield's father was the owner of several area woollen mills, a founding investor in the Crompton & Thayer Loom Company, and a director of the Worcester Trust Company. Scofield's uncle Ernest Thayer was the author of the well-known poem "Casey at the Bat".

Thayer was a Harvard University student. His Harvard years would prove formative; during them Thayer would serve on the staff of the Harvard Monthly. During these years Thayer would also meet many other young poets and authors, including E. E. Cummings, Alan Seeger, Lincoln MacVeagh, Arthur Wilson (later known as Winslow Wilson) and Gilbert Seldes. A large dormitory for freshmen at Harvard, in which Cummings once roomed (room 306), is named after the Thayer family. Thayer graduated from Harvard in 1913. After Harvard, Thayer went to Oxford for post-graduate studies at the same time as T. S. Eliot.

== Career ==
Thayer's involvement with The Dial began in April 1918 when he purchased $600 USD worth of stock in the magazine. In late 1919, Thayer and his fellow Harvard alumnus Dr. James Sibley Watson, Jr. purchased The Dial from the owner, Martyn Johnson, who was suffering financial trouble. Dr. Watson became the magazine's president while Thayer took up the post of editor. Thayer was also assisted by another fellow Harvard alumni, Merrill Rogers, who along with Thayer was responsible for a complete restructuring of the magazine's finances and staff. The new team produced its first issue of Dial in January 1920. The issue featured works from E. E. Cummings, Gaston Lachaise, Arthur Wilson (Winslow Wilson) and Carl Sandburg.

In July 1921, Thayer sailed for Europe. He settled in Vienna, and, although he would remain there for more than two years, he continued to direct the operations of The Dial. He solicited financial backing from European investors and sent layout and content instructions back to the magazine's offices in New York regularly. While in Vienna he was psychoanalysed by Sigmund Freud.

During the mid-1920s Thayer began to suffer a series of mental breakdowns, and began to deteriorate. He resigned as editor of The Dial in June 1926, and spent the remainder of his life in the care of relatives and various institutions and sanatoria. He was diagnosed with paranoid schizophrenia. Watson continued with The Dial, working with editor Marianne Moore. Their final issue was published in July 1929.

Thayer was certified insane in 1937, the year after his mother died. He thenceforth lived the secluded life of a rich man, surrounded by servants, and moving among homes in Bermuda, Florida, Boston, and his family home on Martha's Vineyard.

== Personal life and death ==
Thayer married Elaine Orr on June 21, 1916. He commissioned his friend Cummings to write his poem "Epithalamion" as a wedding present. The marriage did not last long, however, and Thayer moved to his own place. By 1919 Elaine was having an affair with Cummings, giving birth to their daughter, Nancy, in December of that year.

He died on July 9, 1982 at the age of 93 in Edgartown, Massachusetts, leaving a bequest of 400 items from his art collection to the Metropolitan Museum of Art. He left his Aubrey Beardsley collection of drawings to the Fogg Art Museum.

== Bibliography ==
- Hermann Bahr, Arthur Schnitzler: Briefwechsel, Aufzeichnungen, Dokumente 1891–1931. Ed. Kurt Ifkovits, Martin Anton Müller. Göttingen: Wallstein 2018, ISBN 978-3-8353-3228-7 (publisher’s website) One letter from Thayer sent to Hermann Bahr, one letter sent to Arthur Schnitzler, both dated 1922
- James Dempsey. The Tortured Life of Scofield Thayer, Gainesville: University Press of Florida, 2016.
- Nicholas Joost. Scofield Thayer and The Dial: an illustrated history, Carbondale/Edwardsville: Southern Illinois University Press, 1964.
- Nicholas Joost and Alvin Sullivan (1970). D. H. Lawrence and The Dial. Carbondale and Edwardsville: Southern Illinois University Press; London and Amsterdam: Feffer & Simons, Inc.
