= Trumbull Stickney =

American poet (1874–1904)

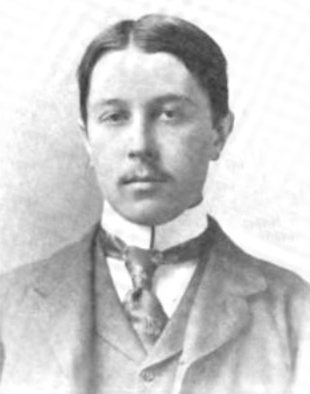
- Born: Joseph Trumbull Stickney; June 20, 1874; Geneva, Switzerland
- Died: October 11, 1904 (aged 30); Cambridge, Massachusetts, US
- Education: Harvard University; Sorbonne
- Occupation: Poet

Joseph Trumbull Stickney (June 20, 1874 – October 11, 1904) was an American classical scholar and poet.

== Biography ==
He was born in Geneva and spent much of his early life in Europe. His father was Austin Stickney, A.B. Harvard 1852, professor of Latin at Trinity College, Hartford, and his mother was Harriet Champion Trumbull Stickney, of a Connecticut family descended from Gov. Jonathan Trumbull. He attended Harvard University from 1891, when he became editor of the Harvard Monthly and a member of Signet Society, to 1895, when he graduated magna cum laude. He then studied for seven years in Paris, taking a doctorate at the Sorbonne. He wrote there two dissertations, a Latin one on the Venetian humanist Ermolao Barbaro, and the other on Les Sentences dans la Poésie Grecque d'Homère à Euripide. The latter is openly indebted to The Birth of Tragedy and to Stickney's study of the Bhagavad Gita under the tutelage of Sylvain Lévi. Stickney's was the first American docteur ès lettres.

He then published a first book of verse Dramatic Verses (1902) and took a position as instructor in classics at Harvard (1903), but died in Cambridge of a brain tumor a year later. Stickney belongs to the number of Harvard poets (or the Harvard Pessimists) who died young, such as Thomas Parker Sanborn, George Cabot Lodge, Philip Henry Savage and Hugh McCulloch.

Stickney's poem "Song" (which describes the earth ebullient in late spring, and the cuckoo singing "not yet") is plagiarized in the Robert De Niro 2006 film The Good Shepherd by a Yale professor of English, acted by Michael Gambon as Dr. Fredericks, in a failed attempt to seduce the protagonist, portrayed by Matt Damon. Two of the poems of Stickney – "Mnemosyne", and "Eride, V" are included in the volume of The Best Poems of the English Language compiled by Professor Harold Bloom and published in 2004, 100 years after the death of the poet.

== Works ==
- Dramatic Verses (1902)
- Les Sentences dans la Poésie Grècque d'Homère à Euripide (1903)
- The Poems of Trumbull Stickney (1905) edited by George Cabot Lodge; William Vaughn Moody, and John Ellerton Lodge
- Trumbull Stickney (1973) edited by Amberys R. Whittle
- Poem "Mnemosyne"
