= William Belmont Parker =

William Belmont Parker (born Hasbury, England, 19 September 1871; died 1934) was a United States editor.

== Biography ==
He came to the United States in early youth, graduated from Harvard in 1897, and in 1898-1902 was assistant editor of the Atlantic Monthly. He was literary adviser to Houghton, Mifflin and Company, New York City, in 1902–04; instructor in English at Harvard in 1904-05 and lecturer in that subject at Columbia in 1905–08.

He was advisory editor of the Associated Sunday Magazines in 1906–08, and literary editor of The World's Work in 1908. He was editor and literary adviser to the Baker and Taylor Company in 1909–12, and literary adviser to the Century Company in 1912. He was business manager of the Churchman in 1912–14. Beginning in 1914, he was an editor with S. Pearson and Son.

== Works ==
He edited:

- James Russell Lowell's Anti-Slavery Papers (1903)
- Philip Sidney's Certaine Sonets (1904)
- Complete Poems of Edward Rowland Sill (1906)
- The Wisdom of Emerson (1909)
- Letters and Addresses of Thomas Jefferson, joint editor (1905)

He wrote:

- Life of Edward Rowland Sill (1915)
- Argentines of to-day (1921, The Hispanic Society of America)
- Bolivians of to-day (1921, The Hispanic Society of America)
- Chileans of to-day (1921, The Hispanic Society of America)
- Cubans of to-day (1921, The Hispanic Society of America)
- Paraguayans of to-day (1921, The Hispanic Society of America)
- Uruguayans of to-day (1921, The Hispanic Society of America)
