= Henry Taylor Parker =

American critic (1867 - 1934)

- Born: 29 April 1867
- Died: March 30, 1934 (aged 66)

Henry Taylor Parker (29 April 1867 – 30 March 1934), known primarily by his initials H. T. P., was an American theater and music critic. Time said Parker's "reviews were famed" and for "29 years he had been Boston's oracle on theatre and music." The magazine also said Parker was a "great critic" as was Philip Hale who died around the same time. Parker was "one of the most distinguished critics of his era, respected for his long, thoughtful, and open‐minded reviews." His biographer said “This remarkable little man of fine perceptions, with his dark eyes burning quizzically in a head bent forward with a sleuthing thrust and emphatic in its nods, was a giant among critics.”

Parker attended Harvard University but was said to have left in displeasure over the number of courses in drama and literature available to him. He worked for several papers newspapers as a correspondent until the 1900s when he became drama and music critic for the New York Globe. In 1905, Parker returned to his native Boston and worked as a critic for the Boston Evening Transcript for the rest of his life.

Parker worked during the era when Boston – a city founded by Puritans – had extreme censorship laws causing many artistic works to be "Banned in Boston". But the theater scene in Boston remained vital helped by "excellence of its theatrical criticism as exemplified by the renown of Henry Taylor Parker and Henry Austin Clapp." In 1922, Parker wrote the book Eighth Notes: Voices and Figures of Music and the Dance.

Parker was a distinctive character. According to Time:

Critic Parker's initials, all he ever signed, gave him the nicknames of "Hard-to-Please" and "Hell-to-Pay." But he was seldom vitriolic. His reviews were famed chiefly for their length (1,250 words, at least), their ornate, old-fashioned sentences, their freshness and independence of viewpoint. Boston knew him for a sputtery, gnomelike person who wore a flowing cape for evening, carried a stout bamboo stick, shunned conversation. He did most of his writing between 3 and 5 a. m., always in longhand on yellow ruled paper. Afternoons saw him in his musty, little Transcript office, painstakingly correcting proof, sorting and editing the world's stage news. No one ever dared to call his page provincial.

Ernest Bloch wrote to Henry Taylor Parker how it "is the Jewish soul that interests me, the complex, glowing, agitated soul that I feel vibrating through the Bible." Parker met Virgil Thomson before the young composer left Cambridge, Massachusetts for Paris. Parker arranged for Thomson to critique musical events in Paris for the Boston Evening Transcript, thus starting Thomson's career as a professional critic.

Parker died from pneumonia at age 66 three days before the opening of a Metropolitan Opera visit to Boston that he helped promote. In his obituary it was said the "little man was missed at the Friday afternoon Symphony where for years he had sat in the front row of the balcony, the seat beside him vacant. Some of Parker's correspondence with Ray Henderson is kept by the New York Public Library for the Performing Arts.

Parker's biography H. T. P.: Portrait of a Critic by David McCord was published the year after his death. Some of Parker's reviews were collected and posthumously published in 1982 as Motion Arrested: Dance Reviews of H. T. Parker edited by Olive Holmes.
