= Rudolph Altrocchi =

- Born: October 31, 1882; Florence, Kingdom of Italy
- Died: May 13, 1953 (aged 70); Berkeley, California

Rudolph Altrocchi (October 31, 1882 – May 13, 1953) was a scholar of Italian language and literature and a university professor.

== Life and work ==
Rudolph Altrocchi was born in Florence, Italy. Altrocchi's family emigrated to the United States when he was a child. He attended Harvard University, earning his A.B. in 1908, his A.M. in 1909, and his Ph.D. in 1914. Between 1910 and 1928, he taught at Columbia University, Harvard University, the University of Pennsylvania, the University of Chicago, and Brown University. From 1928 to his retirement in 1947, he served as chairman of the Italian department at the University of California, Berkeley.

He married in 1920. His wife, Julia Cooley Altrocchi, published a large number of children's books. They had two sons, John and Paul. Paul Hemenway Altrocchi became a renowned neurologist.

Altrocchi served in the American Expeditionary Force during World War I, managing propaganda and liaison functions in Rome and Lyon, France.

Active in academic organisations, Altrocchi served as president of the American Association of Teachers of Italian and the Philological Association of the Pacific Coast.

Altrocchi's 1944 book Sleuthing in the Stacks was a collection of irreverent essays in which Altrocchi deftly dissected such varied topics as forged marginal notes in an obscure Renaissance text, the literary and mythical predecessors of Tarzan, and the image of Dante in a minor painting in a church in Florence.

He died in Berkeley, California.

== Bibliography ==
- Deceptive Cognates: Italian-English and English-Italian (1935)
- Sleuthing in the Stacks (1944)
