= Lucien Price =

American journalist

- Born: January 6, 1883; Kent, Ohio, U.S.
- Died: March 30, 1964 (aged 81); Cambridge, Massachusetts, U.S.
- Education: Western Reserve Academy (1901); Harvard University (1907)
- Occupations: Author; journalist
- Writing career
- Pen name: Seymour Deming

Junius Lucien Price (January 6, 1883 – March 30, 1964), who also published under the name Seymour Deming, was the author of more than a dozen books and a writer for publications such as the Boston Evening Transcript and The Atlantic Monthly. At the time of his death at age 81, he was still writing for The Boston Globe.

== Biography ==
Price had a Yankee grandfather, Abel Burt, who left Brimfield, Massachusetts, and settled in Brimfield, Ohio in the Connecticut Western Reserve . "We were New England transplantees," Price wrote of his family, "and we had two choices: either to rot or to grow". Price was born January 6, 1883, in Kent, Ohio. A journalist there later reported that Price "immortalized fond memories of hometown" there. In his writing Price created "Woolwick," a pseudonym for Kent, and described the place as "built on the banks of a steep rivergorge ... half railroad-junction and half agrarian market-town".

Price attended Western Reserve Academy in Hudson, Ohio. He kept in close contact with his prep school for the rest of his life and was regularly invited back for events. Prince had "lengthy and lively correspondence with Headmaster Joel B. Hayden" and, near the end of his life, made arrangements to transfer approximately 3,000 volumes of his personal library to Western Reserve Academy. There was for several years a "Lucien Price Room" suitable as classroom space and used to house some special items of the "Lucien Price Book Collection", but the room was phased out with the start of the new John D. Ong Library in the spring of 2000.

After his 1901 graduation from Western Reserve Academy, Price left Ohio and attended Harvard University and graduated with Phi Beta Kappa honors in 1907. While there, although not 'out' he was fairly open about his homosexuality and several of his early books relate the love affair he had there with a fellow Harvard student. Several chapters of Douglass Shand-Tucci's book "The Crimson Letter: Harvard, Homosexuality, and the Shaping of American Culture" are devoted to Price. He joined the staff of the Boston Evening Transcript as an editorial writer and arts reviewer from 1907 to 1914. He went on to create "an illustrious career as a writer and journalist" in Greater Boston and wrote for The Boston Globe for the rest of his life. Price died March 30, 1964, in Cambridge, Massachusetts.

Among Price's published work is a book based on recorded conversations with English mathematician and philosopher Alfred North Whitehead, Dialogues of Alfred North Whitehead. He also published books on education as well as memoirs of his early life in Ohio. Three of his books were published under the pseudonym "Seymour Deming".

In 1965, a year after the author's death, Mrs. F. H. Middleton of Hudson, Massachusetts, gave Price's personal papers and correspondence to Harvard where they are now housed in the Houghton Library of Harvard College in Cambridge, Massachusetts, and take up six boxes, each three feet in length. A separate collection of his papers from 1951 to 1958 are kept at Columbia University in New York City. This group of material includes notes, manuscripts, typescripts, and galley proofs for Hellas Regained, October Rhapsody, and The Sacred Legion — three novels in Price's "All Souls" series.
