= Ernest Bernbaum =

American writer and scholar (1879–1958)

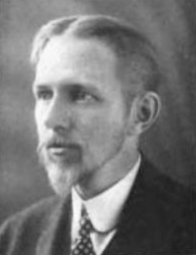
- Born: February 12, 1879; Brooklyn, New York
- Died: March 8, 1958 (aged 79); Jaffrey, New Hampshire
- Education: Brooklyn Polytechnic Institute; Harvard University
- Occupation: Academic
- Spouse: Ruth Guenther (m. 1921)

Ernest Bernbaum (February 12, 1879 – March 8, 1958) was an American educator, scholar, writer and an opponent of the Suffragette movement.

== Biography ==
Ernest Bernbaum was born in Brooklyn, New York, the son of Ole Kruse Bernbaum and Dorothea (née Christiansen) Bernbaum. He was educated at Brooklyn Polytechnic Institute. He attended Harvard University, where he was awarded a Ph.D. in philology in 1907. He taught English at Harvard from 1907 to 1916, then joined the staff of the University of Illinois. From 1917 to 1919, he was chair of the Committee on War Lectures at Illinois. In 1921 he married Ruth Guenther. He remained at the University of Illinois until 1945.

He died from at a stroke at his home in Jaffrey, New Hampshire on March 8, 1958.

== Bibliography ==
- Mrs. Behn's Biography, a Fiction (1913)
- The Mary Carleton Narratives, 1663-1673: a Missing Chapter in the History of the English Novel (1914)
- The Drama of Sensibility: a Sketch of the History of English Sentimental Comedy and Domestic Tragedy, 1696-1780 (1915)
- Editor, Anti-Suffrage Essays by Massachusetts Women (1916)
- English Poets of the Eighteenth Century (1918)
- The Place of The Pilgrims in American History: The Puritan Pilgrim (1920)
- Recent Works on Prose Fiction Before 1800 (1927)
- Anthology of Romanticism and Guide Through the Romantic Movement (1929)
