= Seldes =

Seldes is a surname. Notable people with the surname include:

- George Seldes (1890–1995), American journalist, editor, author, and media critic
- Gilbert Seldes (1893–1970), American writer and cultural critic, brother of George
- Marian Seldes (1928–2014), American actress, daughter of Gilbert
- Paul Seldes (1958-present) American Emergency Management and Homeland Security pioneer. Also an elite scuba diving instructor and technical diving pioneer.
