= You Are There (franchise) =

American historical educational television and radio series

- DVD box set
- Created by: Goodman Ace
- Original work: You Are There
- Owner: CBS
- Years: 1947-1957

Films and television
- Television series: You Are There (1953-1957)

Audio
- Radio program: You Are There (1947-1950)

You Are There is a 1947–1957 American historical educational television and radio series broadcast over the CBS Radio and CBS Television networks.

== Radio ==
Created by Goodman Ace for CBS Radio, the original radio version of the series portrayed an entire network newsroom on a figurative time warp each week reporting the great events of the past. Reporters included John Charles Daly, Don Hollenbeck, and Richard C. Hottelet. The series was first heard on July 7, 1947, under the title CBS Is There. Its final broadcast was on March 19, 1950, under the title You Are There.

According to author/historian Martin Grams, actor Canada Lee was a guest in episodes 32 and 60. Martin Gabel appeared in character in episode 82. The first 23 broadcasts went under the title CBS Is There and beginning with episode 24, the title changed to You Are There. A total of 90 episodes were broadcast. Only 75 episodes are known to exist in recorded form.

== Television ==
The radio program made a transition to television in 1953, with Walter Cronkite as the regular host. Reporters included veteran radio announcers Dick Joy and Harlow Wilcox. The first telecast took place on February 1, 1953, and featured a re-enactment of the Hindenburg disaster. The final telecast took place on June 9, 1957.

Originally telecast live, most of the later episodes were produced on film. One of the episodes, for instance, features actor Pat Conway as James J. Corbett, the boxer who fought champion John L. Sullivan in 1892.

The series also featured various key events in American and world history, portrayed in dramatic recreations. Events that were covered included the Battle of Hastings, the execution of Joan of Arc, the Spanish conquest of the Aztec Empire by Hernán Cortés, and the signing of the U.S. Declaration of Independence. Additionally, CBS News reporters, in modern-day suits, reported on the action and interviewed the protagonists of each of the historical episodes. Each episode began with the characters setting the scene. Cronkite, from his anchor desk in New York City, gave a few words on what was about to happen. An announcer then gave the date and the event, followed by a loud and boldly spoken "You are there!"

At the end of the program, after Cronkite summarized what happened in the preceding event, he reminded viewers, "What sort of day was it? A day like all days, filled with those events that alter and illuminate our times... all things are as they were then, except you were there."

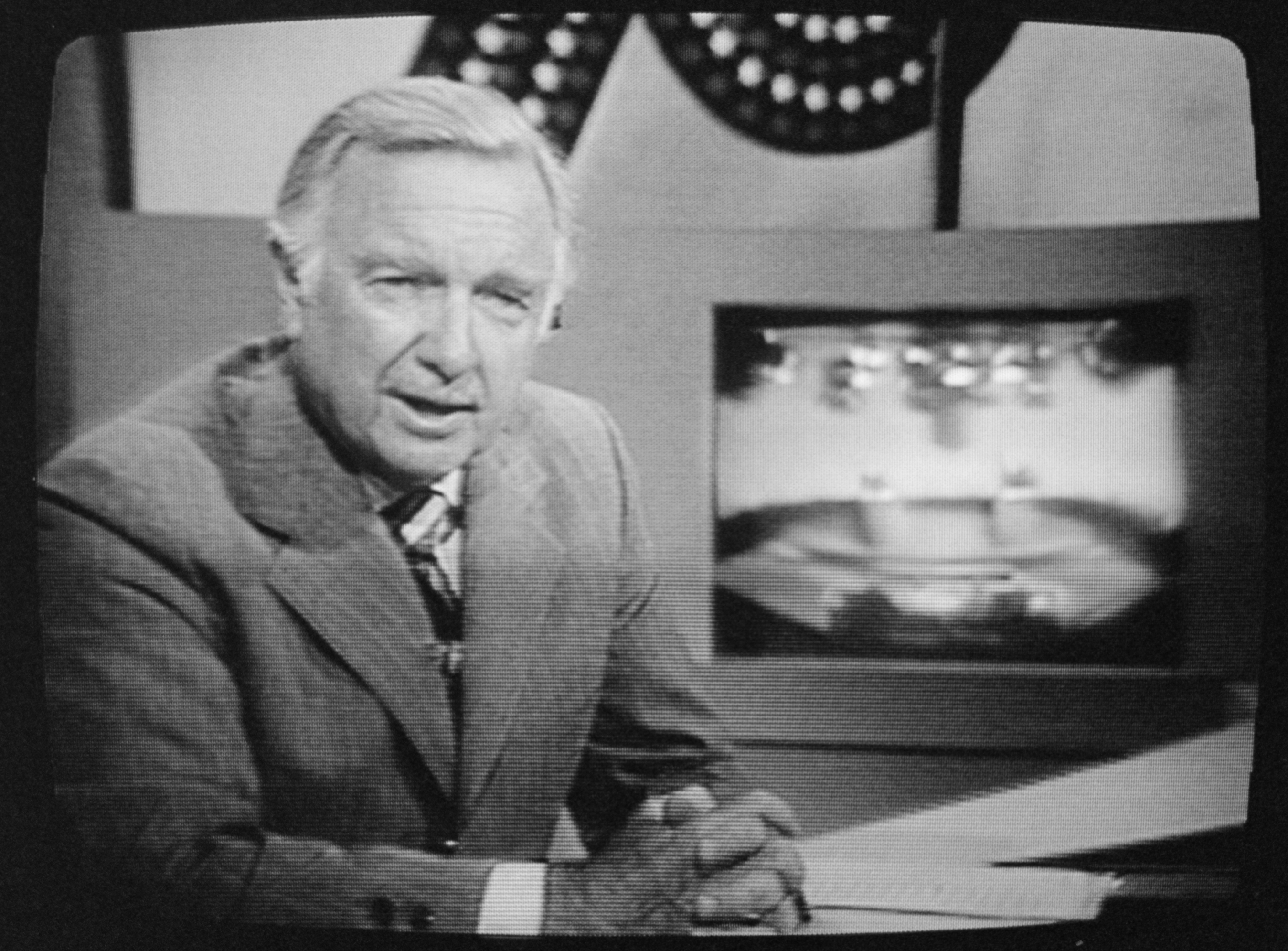
Walter Cronkite, TV host of You Are There

In cooperation with CBS, the BBC created and broadcast a United Kingdom version aired for thirty-two episodes in 1954 and 1958. It primarily focused on the historical re-enactments present in the American version.

The program was seen again on Saturday morning as a videotaped color program from 1971 to 1972. The format of the revival was basically the same as the original versions. These programs were also hosted by Cronkite. Both series were produced by CBS News.

From 2000 to 2005, Cronkite presented a series of essays for National Public Radio, reflecting on various key events of his life, including his involvement in You Are There in the 1950s.

Notable guest stars included:

- Louis Armstrong as King Oliver and Billy Taylor as Jelly Roll Morton in "The Emergence of Jazz (November 20, 1917)" (1954)
- Parley Baer as Benjamin Franklin in "Benjamin Franklin's Kite Experiment (June 15, 1752)" (1956)
- John Cassavetes as Plato in "The Death of Socrates (399 B.C.)" (1953)
- Pat Conway as James J. Corbett and Jeff York as John L. Sullivan in "The Birth of Modern Boxing (September 7, 1892)" (1955)
- John Craven as Henry M. Stanley and Leonard Mudie as David Livingstone in "When Stanley Finds Livingstone (November 10, 1871)" (1956)
- Robert Culp as Xenophon in "The Death of Socrates (399 B.C.)" (1953)
- James Dean as Robert Ford in "The Capture of Jesse James (April 3, 1882)" (1953)
- Cyril Delevanti as Alexander Fleming in "The First Major Use of Penicillin (April 1, 1943)" (1955)
- Mildred Dunnock as Queen Elizabeth in "The First Command Performance of Romeo and Juliet (1597)" (1954)
- Lorne Greene as Charles Stewart Parnell in "The Fall of Parnell (December, 1890)" (1954)
- Vivi Janiss as Mrs. Gilchrist in "The Attack on Pearl Harbor (December 7, 1941)" (1953)
- Diana Lynn as Joan of Arc in "The Final Hours of Joan of Arc (May 30, 1431)" (1956)
- E. G. Marshall as George Washington in "Washington's Farewell to His Officers (December 4, 1783)" (1955)
- Felicia Montealegre Bernstein in "The Death of Rasputin" (1954)
- Paul Newman as Marcus Brutus in "The Assassination of Julius Caesar" (1953) and as Nathan Hale in "The Fate of Nathan Hale" (1953)
- Jeanette Nolan as Sarah Bernhardt in "The Final Performance of Sarah Bernhardt (November 30, 1922)" (1955)
- Ainslie Pryor as William Jennings Bryan in "William Jennings Bryan's Presidential Nomination"
- Milton Selzer as Mahatma Gandhi in "The Sacrifice of Mahatma Gandhi (September 25, 1932)" (1954) and as General Knox in "Washington's Farewell to His Officers (December 4, 1783)" (1955)
- Kim Stanley as Joan of Arc in "The Execution of Joan of Arc (May 30, 1431)" (1953) and as Cleopatra in "The Death of Cleopatra (30 B.C.)" (1953)
- Rod Steiger as Romeo/Richard Burbage in "The First Command Performance of Romeo and Juliet (1597)" (1954) and as Grigori Rasputin in "The Death of Rasputin" (1954)
- Beatrice Straight as Anne Boleyn in "The Crisis of Anne Boleyn (May 16, 1536)" (1954)
- George Voskovec as General von Steuben in "Washington's Farewell to His Officers (December 4, 1783)" (1955)
- Douglass Watson as Mercutio/Shakespeare in "The First Command Performance of Romeo and Juliet (1597)" (1954)
- Joseph Wiseman as Gaius Cassius Longinus in "The Assassination of Julius Caesar" (1953)
- Joanne Woodward in "The Oklahoma Land Rush (April 22, 1889)" (1954)

== Home media ==
22 episodes of the 1950s version of You Are There are available on DVD from Woodhaven Entertainment. The 1970s version is currently not available on VHS or DVD. Chicago's Museum of Broadcast Communications has 20 episodes available for on-site viewing only. Both versions have also been made available to schools on 16mm film for educational purposes.

Some episodes of the radio and television version are available for sale commercially. CBS retains the copyrights.

== In popular culture ==
- The 1950s edition was briefly parodied as Were You There in the 1956 Merrie Melodies cartoon, Wideo Wabbit, featuring Bugs Bunny and Elmer Fudd, as Fudd's pursuit of Bugs lands him in a re-enactment of Custer's Last Stand.
  - The 1950s edition was also parodied as Were You There in the 1959 Merrie Melodies cartoon People Are Bunny, featuring Bugs Bunny and Daffy Duck, where Daffy, in pursuit of Bugs for the prize of a thousand dollars for the first rabbit at Studio QTTV, is tricked into rushing into a re-enactment of "Indian Massacre at Burton's Bend".
- On one of the "Classic 39" episodes of The Honeymooners, Art Carney as Norton—hearing Jackie Gleason as Ralph say he had a plan to get wife Alice (Audrey Meadows) to give him the money to go to the Raccoon Lodge convention—launched into this soliloquy parodying You Are There's famous catchphrase: "May 3, 1953. Ralph Kramden … in search … for money … for capital … to enter his No-Cal Pizzeria … He says, 'I have a sure-fire plan of getting the money, it can't fail!' … Alice Kramden says, 'No!' … unquote … all things are as they were then, except you are there!"
- The series was parodied on The Ernie Kovacs Show as "Vas You Dere?" The cast performed a lampoon of the stabbing of Julius Caesar, presented as a carnival act.
- The series was parodied on a segment of The Victor Borge Show which featured journalist Mike Wallace interviewing Franz Liszt (played by Borge) through a "time window". Wallace opened the interview by asking "Are you there?" in a similar style to the series' opening.
- The series was parodied on The Electric Company in a sketch titled You Weren't There. "You weren't born yet, you were out of town, or you just weren't paying attention," says the narrator.
- The Evangelical Christian radio program Adventures in Odyssey used the device of a modern news room reporting on past events for their "O.T. Action News" segments.
- The series was parodied in an episode of Xena: Warrior Princess. Titled "You Are There", the episode features a modern-day reporter doggedly following and interviewing various characters (believed to be real, historical figures within the premise of the TV show), both in the field and a studio setting.

== Sources ==
- The Complete Directory to Prime Time Network and Cable TV Shows 1946–Present by Tim Brooks and Earle Marsh (Ballantine Books, New York, 1995)
- Radio Drama: American Programs 1932–1962 by Martin Grams (McFarland & Company, Inc., Publishers, North Carolina, 2000)
