= 25th Tony Awards =

1971 US theatrical awards ceremony

- Date: March 28, 1971
- Location: Palace Theatre, New York City, New York
- Hosted by: Lauren Bacall, Angela Lansbury, Anthony Quayle and Anthony Quinn
- Most wins: Company (6)
- Most nominations: Company (14)

Television/radio coverage
- Network: ABC

The 25th Annual Tony Awards ceremony was held on March 28, 1971, at the Palace Theatre in New York City. The ceremony was broadcast by ABC television. Hosts were Lauren Bacall, Angela Lansbury, Anthony Quayle and Anthony Quinn.

== Eligibility ==
Shows that opened on Broadway during the 1970–1971 season before March 17, 1971 are eligible.

Original plays

- Abelard and Heloise
- And Miss Reardon Drinks a Little
- The Candyapple
- The Castro Complex
- Conduct Unbecoming
- The Engagement Baby
- Father's Day
- Foreplay
- Four on a Garden
- Gandhi
- The Gingerbread Lady
- Happy Birthday, Wanda June
- Home
- Inquest
- Les Blancs
- Not Now, Darling
- Opium
- Paul Sills' Story Theatre
- The Philanthropist
- A Place for Polly
- A Place Without Doors
- Sleuth
- Wilson in the Promise Land

Original musicals

- Amahl and the Night Visitors
- Ari
- Company
- Help, Help, the Globolinks!
- Light, Lively and Yiddish
- Lovely Ladies, Kind Gentlemen
- The Me Nobody Knows
- Park
- The President's Daughter
- The Rothschilds
- Soon
- Two by Two

Play revivals

- Beggar on Horseback
- Charley's Aunt
- The Cherry Orchard
- A Doll's House
- An Enemy of the People
- The Good Woman of Setzuan
- Hay Fever
- Hedda Gabler
- A Midsummer Night's Dream
- Othello
- The Playboy of the Western World
- The School for Wives

Musical revivals

- The Boy Friend
- No, No, Nanette

== The ceremony ==
The theme was to show highlights from 25 years of musicals that had won Tonys, and the stars who introduced them. The show opened with "What's Happening at the Palace". The presenters were Dick Cavett, Carol Channing and Ruby Keeler.

Saluting 25 Years of Tony Award-Winning Musicals:

- Finian's Rainbow ("When I'm Not Near the Girl I Love" - David Wayne)
- High Button Shoes ("Papa, Wont You Dance with Me?" - Nanette Fabray)
- Kiss Me, Kate ("Where is the Life That Late I Led?" - Alfred Drake)
- South Pacific ("There Is Nothing Like a Dame" - Ray Walston and Company)
- Guys and Dolls ("Adelaide's Lament" - Vivian Blaine)
- The King and I ("Shall We Dance?" - Patricia Morrison and Yul Brynner)
- Wonderful Town ("It's Love" - Edie Adams)
- Kismet ("The Olive Tree" - Alfred Drake)
- Can-Can
- The Pajama Game ("Hey There" - John Raitt)
- Damn Yankees ("Whatever Lola Wants" - Gwen Verdon)
- My Fair Lady ("Get Me to the Church on Time" - Stanley Holloway and Company)
- The Music Man ("Ya Got Trouble" - Robert Preston and Company)
- Redhead
- Fiorello! ("The Name's La Guardia" - Tom Bosley and Company)
- The Sound of Music ("The Sound of Music" - Florence Henderson)
- Bye Bye Birdie ("Kids" - Paul Lynde)
- How to Succeed in Business Without Really Trying ("I Believe in You" - Robert Morse)
- A Funny Thing Happened on the Way to the Forum ("Comedy Tonight" - Zero Mostel)
- Hello, Dolly! ("Before the Parade Passes By" - Carol Channing)
- Fiddler on the Roof ("If I Were A Rich Man" - Zero Mostel)
- Mame ("Open A New Window" - Angela Lansbury)
- Man of La Mancha ("The Impossible Dream (The Quest)" - Richard Kiley)
- Cabaret ("Cabaret" - Jill Haworth)
- Hallelujah, Baby! ("Now's the Time") - Leslie Uggams)
- 1776 ("Yours, Yours, Yours" - William Daniels and Virginia Vestoff)
- Applause

The finale was "There's No Business Like Show Business" sung by the entire company.

The performers: Edie Adams, Lauren Bacall, Vivian Blaine, Tom Bosley, Yul Brynner, Carol Channing, William Daniels, Alfred Drake, Nanette Fabray, Jill Haworth, Florence Henderson, Stanley Holloway, Richard Kiley, Angela Lansbury, Paul Lynde, Patricia Morison, Robert Morse, Zero Mostel, Robert Preston, John Raitt, Leslie Uggams, Gwen Verdon, Virginia Vestoff, Ray Walston, David Wayne.

== Winners and nominees ==
Winners are in bold

Best Play	Best Musical
**Sleuth – Anthony Shaffer**; Home – David Storey; The Philanthropist – Christopher Hampton; Paul Sills' Story Theatre – Paul Sills	**Company**; The Me Nobody Knows; The Rothschilds
Best Score for a Musical	Best Lyrics for a Musical
**Company – Stephen Sondheim**; The Me Nobody Knows – Gary William Friedman; The Rothschilds – Jerry Bock	**Company – Stephen Sondheim**; The Me Nobody Knows – Will Holt; The Rothschilds – Sheldon Harnick
Best Book of a Musical
**George Furth – Company**; Robert H. Livingston and Herb Schapiro – The Me Nobody Knows; Sherman Yellen – The Rothschilds
Best Performance by a Leading Actor in a Play	Best Performance by a Leading Actress in a Play
**Brian Bedford – The School for Wives as Arnolphe**; John Gielgud – Home as Harry; Alec McCowen – The Philanthropist as Philip; Ralph Richardson – Home as Jack	**Maureen Stapleton – The Gingerbread Lady as Evy Meara**; Estelle Parsons – And Miss Reardon Drinks a Little as Catherine Reardon; Diana Rigg – Abelard and Heloise as Heloise; Marian Seldes – Father's Day as Marian
Best Performance by a Leading Actor in a Musical	Best Performance by a Leading Actress in a Musical
**Hal Linden – The Rothschilds as Mayer Rothschild**; David Burns – Lovely Ladies, Kind Gentlemen as Col. Wainwright Purdy III; Larry Kert – Company as Bobby; Bobby Van – No, No, Nanette as Billy Early	**Helen Gallagher – No, No, Nanette as Lucille Early**; Susan Browning – Company as April; Sandy Duncan – The Boy Friend as Maisie; Elaine Stritch – Company as Joanne
Best Performance by a Supporting or Featured Actor in a Play	Best Performance by a Supporting or Featured Actress in a Play
**Paul Sand – Paul Sills' Story Theatre as Various Characters**; Ronald Radd – Abelard and Heloise as Gilies de Vannes; Donald Pickering – Conduct Unbecoming as Capt. Rupert Harper; Ed Zimmermann – The Philanthropist as Donald	**Rae Allen – And Miss Reardon Drinks a Little as Fleur Stein**; Lili Darvas – Les Blancs as Madame Neilsen; Joan Van Ark – The School for Wives as Agnes; Mona Washbourne – Home as Kathleen
Best Performance by a Supporting or Featured Actor in a Musical	Best Performance by a Supporting or Featured Actress in a Musical
**Keene Curtis – The Rothschilds as Various Characters**; Charles Kimbrough – Company as Harry; Walter Willison – Two by Two as Japheth	**Patsy Kelly – No, No, Nanette as Pauline**; Barbara Barrie – Company as Sarah; Pamela Myers – Company as Marta
Best Direction of a Play	Best Direction of a Musical
**Peter Brook – A Midsummer Night's Dream**; Lindsay Anderson – Home; Stephen Porter – The School for Wives; Clifford Williams – Sleuth	**Harold Prince – Company**; Michael Kidd – The Rothschilds; Robert H. Livingston – The Me Nobody Knows; Burt Shevelove – No, No, Nanette
Best Choreography	Best Scenic Design
**Donald Saddler – No, No, Nanette**; Michael Bennett – Company; Michael Kidd – The Rothschilds	**Boris Aronson – Company**; John Bury – The Rothschilds; Sally Jacobs – A Midsummer Night's Dream; Jo Mielziner – Father's Day
Best Costume Design	Best Lighting Design
**Raoul Pene Du Bois – No, No, Nanette**; Jane Greenwood – Hay Fever and Les Blancs; Freddy Wittop – Lovely Ladies, Kind Gentlemen	**R.H. Poindexter – Paul Sills' Story Theatre**; Robert Ornbo – Company; William Ritman – Sleuth

== Special awards ==
- Elliot Norton, drama critic, for distinguished theatrical commentary.
- Ingram Ash, president of Blaine-Thompson Advertising, for decades of devoted service to the theatre.
- Playbill, for chronicling Broadway through the years.
- Roger L. Stevens

=== Multiple nominations and awards ===
These productions had multiple nominations:

- 14 nominations: Company
- 9 nominations: The Rothschilds
- 6 nominations: No, No, Nanette
- 5 nominations: Home and The Me Nobody Knows
- 3 nominations: Paul Sills' Story Theatre, The Philanthropist, The School for Wives and Sleuth
- 2 nominations: Abelard and Heloise, And Miss Reardon Drinks a Little, Father's Day, Les Blancs, Lovely Ladies, Kind Gentlemen and A Midsummer Night's Dream

The following productions received multiple awards.

- 6 wins: Company
- 4 wins: No, No, Nanette
- 2 wins: Paul Sills' Story Theatre and The Rothschilds

== See also ==
- 43rd Academy Awards
