= Have Gun – Will Travel =

American Western television series (1957–1963)

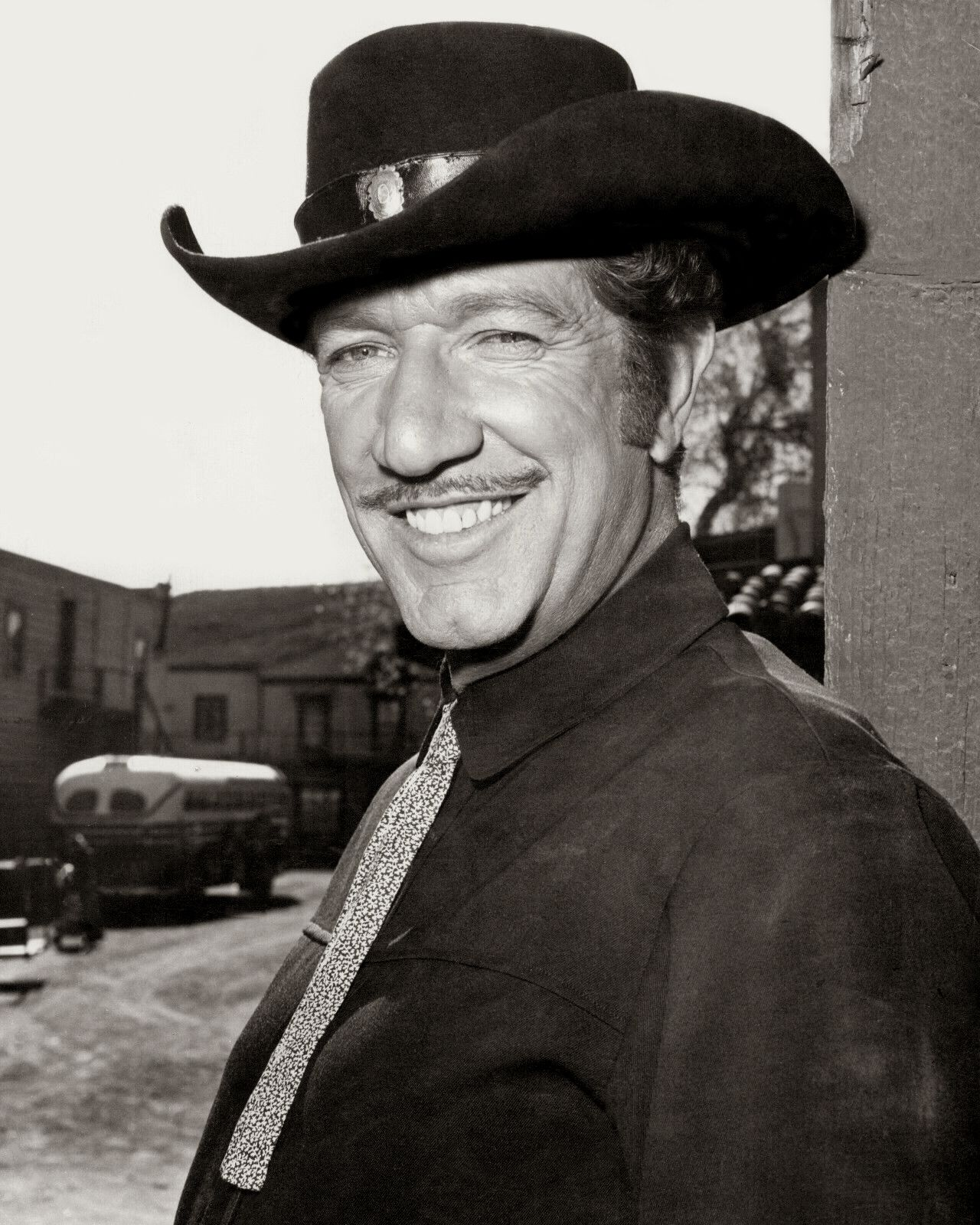
- Richard Boone as Paladin
- Genre: Western
- Created by: Sam Rolfe; Herb Meadow
- Directed by: Andrew V. McLaglen; Richard Donner; Lamont Johnson; Ida Lupino; Richard Boone; William Conrad; others
- Starring: Richard Boone; Kam Tong
- Narrated by: Richard Boone
- Ending theme: "The Ballad of Paladin"
- Composers: Bernard Herrmann; Johnny Western; Richard Boone; Sam Rolfe
- Country of origin: United States
- Original language: English
- No. of seasons: 6
- No. of episodes: 225 (list of episodes)

Production
- Producers: Julian Claman; Sam Rolfe
- Running time: 25 mins.
- Production companies: CBS Productions; Filmaster Productions

Original release
- Network: CBS
- Release: September 14, 1957 – April 20, 1963

Have Gun – Will Travel is an American Western television series that was produced and originally broadcast by CBS on both television and radio from 1957 through 1963. The television version of the series starring Richard Boone was rated number three or number four in the Nielsen ratings every year of its first four seasons.

Set in the period of the Old West, the series follows the adventures of Paladin, played by Boone, a gentleman investigator who also works as a gunfighter for hire. Although Paladin charges steep fees to clients who can afford to hire him, typically $1,000 per job, he provides his services for free to poor people who need his help.

A radio series starring John Dehner debuted November 23, 1958, more than a year after the premiere of its televised counterpart, making Have Gun – Will Travel one of the few shows in television history to spawn a successful radio version.

== Premise ==
This series follows the adventures of a man calling himself "Paladin" (played by Richard Boone on television and voiced by John Dehner on radio), taking his name Paladin from that of the foremost knights in Charlemagne's court. He is a gentleman investigator/gunfighter who travels around the Old West working as a mercenary for people who hire him to solve their problems.

Like many Westerns, the television show was set in a time vaguely indicated to be some years after the American Civil War. The radio show announced the year of the story that followed in the opening of each episode.

The season-five television episode, "A Drop of Blood", gives the specific date of July 3, 1879. In the 14th and 17th ("Lazarus", March 6 and 7, 1875) episodes of season five, it is 1875.

There have been many efforts to make the series into a movie, but none to date has been successful.

== Characters ==
=== Paladin ===
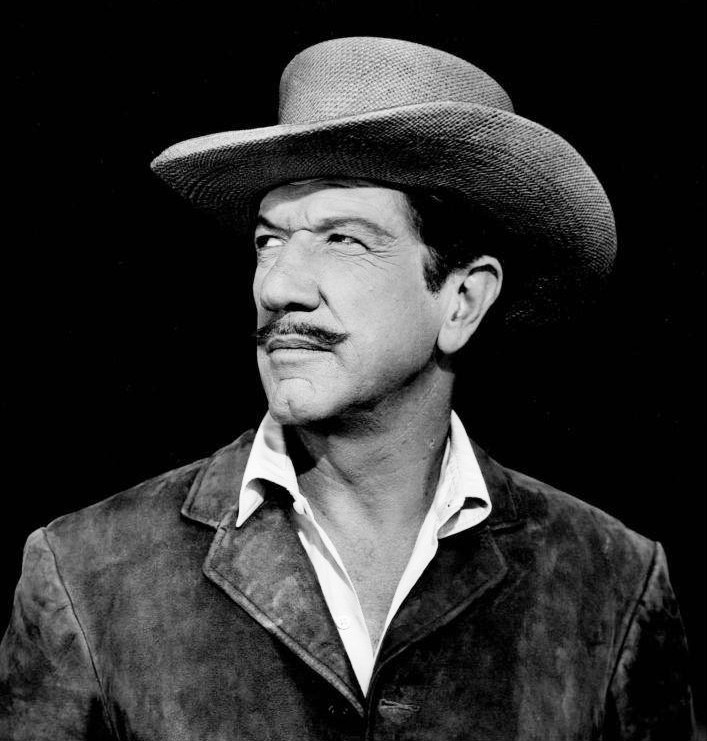
Richard Boone in the episode "Genesis" (1962), before becoming the famed "knight without armor", Paladin

Paladin prefers to settle the difficulties clients bring his way without violence, but this rarely happens. When forced, he excels in fisticuffs. Under his real name, which is never revealed, he was a dueling champion of some renown. Paladin is a graduate of the United States Military Academy at West Point and a veteran of the American Civil War, in which he served as a Union cavalry officer. In the episode "The Bostonian", he indirectly reveals he comes from Boston (or at least spent some time there), claiming, "In my youth ... I was the best-dressed bouncer in Scollay Square." His permanent place of residence is the Hotel Carlton in San Francisco, where he lives the life of a successful businessman and bon vivant, wearing elegant custom-made suits, consuming fine wine, playing the piano, and attending the opera and other cultural events. He is an expert chess player, poker player, and swordsman. He is skilled in Chinese martial arts, and is seen in several episodes receiving instruction and training with a kung fu master in San Francisco. He is highly educated, able to quote classic literature, philosophy, Scripture, and case law, and speaks several languages. He is also president of the San Francisco Stock Exchange Club.

When out working, Paladin changes into all-black Western-style clothing. His primary weapon is a custom-made, first-generation .45 caliber Colt Single Action Army Cavalry Model revolver with an unusual rifled barrel, carried in a black leather holster (with a platinum chess knight symbol facing the rear), hanging from a black leather gunbelt. He also carries a lever-action Marlin rifle (with a platinum chess knight symbol facing the rear seen in "The Hunt") strapped to his saddle. In some episodes, he has a two-shot Remington derringer concealed under his belt; in other episodes, it is a single-shot Merrimack Arms "Southerner" derringer.

This calling card was the identifying graphic of the Have Gun – Will Travel series.

Paladin gives out a business card imprinted with "Have Gun Will Travel" and an engraving of a white knight chess piece, which evokes the proverbial white knight and the knight in shining armor. Underneath the chess piece is the wording "Wire Paladin", and under that, "San Francisco". A closeup of this card is used as a title card between scenes in the program.

A Man Called Paladin, Frank C. Robertson's novelization of the season-six premiere "Genesis", gives Paladin's real name as Clay Alexander.

=== Other recurring characters ===
The one other major semiregular character in the show is the Chinese bellhop at the Carlton Hotel, known as Hey Boy (real name Kim Chan or Kim Chang); in the first season in the episode called "Hey Boy's Revenge", the character Hey Boy is sought by Paladin under the name Kim Chan, which is written on a piece of paper and shown on screen. As the episode continues, Hey Boy is referred to (verbally) five times as Kim Chan and then on the sixth incident Paladin states Hey Boy's name as Kim Chang and thereafter he is referred to as Kim Chang every time. No explanation is given for the name change.

Hey Boy is played by Kam Tong. According to author and historian Martin Grams Jr., Hey Boy is featured in all but the fourth of the show's six seasons, with the character of Hey Girl, played by Lisa Lu, replacing Hey Boy for season four while Kam Tong worked on the Mr. Garlund television series. Lisa Lu had previously played Hey Boy's sister, Kim Li, in "Hey Boy's Revenge".

Character actor Olan Soule appears in 10 episodes across all six seasons of Have Gun – Will Travel as an employee of the Carlton Hotel, usually identified as the manager/desk clerk. The character's name is inconsistent, being given as "Cartwright" in two episodes, and "Matthews" in another. Tony Regan also appears as an unnamed desk clerk in over a dozen episodes, between seasons two and five. Hal Needham, later a noted director, worked on the show as a stunt performer and can be seen as a bit-part player (in a wide variety of roles) in nearly 50 episodes.

=== Notable guest stars ===
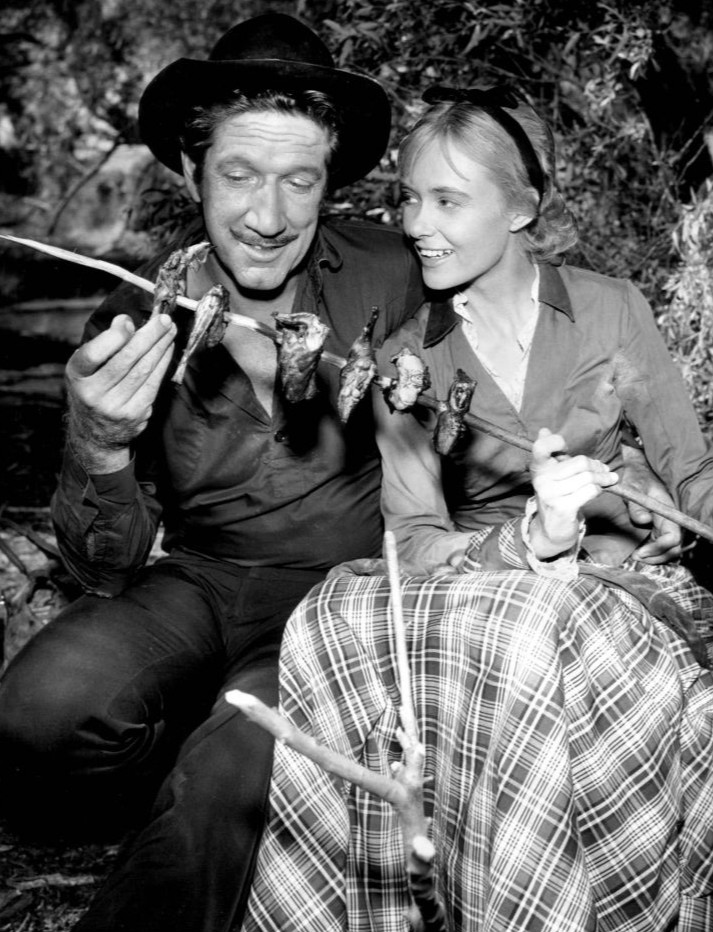
With Christine White, 1958

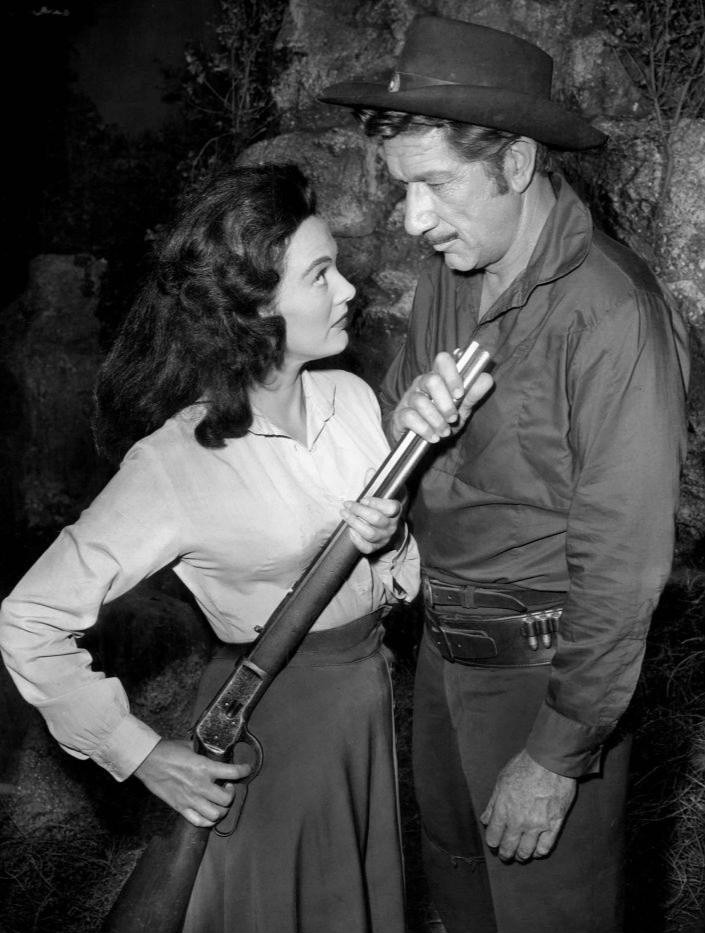
With Patricia Medina, 1960

Guest stars included:

- Mary Adams
- Claude Akins
- Jack Albertson as Mayor Whiteside / Jason Coldwell / Bookie
- Martin Balsam as Marshall Jim Brock / Charles Dawes
- Roxane Berard
- Edward Binns
- Robert Blake as Lauro / Jessie May Turnbow / Smollet
- Dan Blocker as Joe
- Charles Bronson
- Kathie Browne as Marie Ellis / Lydia Moss
- Edgar Buchanan as Cardiff
- Dyan Cannon as Fifi
- Jeanne Carmen as Paladin's Love Interest / Blonde Glamour Girl
- John Carradine
- Lon Chaney Jr.
- James Coburn as Bill Sledge / Jack
- Mike Connors as Johnny Dart
- William Conrad as Moses Kadish / Norge
- James Craig
- Ken Curtis as Monk
- Angie Dickinson as Amy Bender
- Ivan Dixon as Isham Spruce
- Buddy Ebsen
- Duane Eddy as Young Cowboy / Carter Whitney Tyler
- Jack Elam as Joe Gage
- Peter Falk as Waller
- James Franciscus as Tom Nelson
- Peggy Ann Garner as Virginia "Ginger" Adams
- Lisa Gaye as Nancy Warren / Helen Abajinian
- Virginia Gregg
- Murray Hamilton
- Ted Hamilton as Catcher
- Ben Johnson
- DeForest Kelley as Deakin
- George Kennedy as Preston / Deke / Rud / Saxon / Brother Grace / Big John
- Werner Klemperer as Etienne
- Patric Knowles
- June Lockhart as Dr. Phyllis Thackeray
- Jack Lord as Dave Enderby
- Strother Martin as Carew / Boise Peabody
- Victor McLaglen as Mike O'Hare
- Patricia Medina as Diana Coulter / Sabina
- James Mitchum
- Harry Morgan
- Jeanette Nolan
- Warren Oates as John Bosworth / Harrison
- Odetta
- Hank Patterson
- Suzanne Pleshette as Maria
- Sydney Pollack as Joe Culp
- Vincent Price as Charles Matthews / Othello
- Denver Pyle as Clay Sommers
- Pernell Roberts
- Janice Rule
- Albert Salmi as Father Montalvo
- George Sowards
- Harry Dean Stanton as "Slim" Wilder / Stoneman
- Lee Van Cleef as Corbin / Golias
- Jack Weston
- Christine White
- Stuart Whitman

== Production ==
Have Gun – Will Travel was created by Sam Rolfe and Herb Meadow and produced by Frank Pierson, Don Ingalls, Robert Sparks, and Julian Claman. Of the 225 episodes of the television series, 24 were written by Gene Roddenberry. Other major contributors included Bruce Geller, Harry Julian Fink, Don Brinkley, and Irving Wallace. Andrew V. McLaglen directed 101 episodes, and 28 were directed by series star Richard Boone.

=== Filming locations ===
Unlike many Westerns, entire episodes were filmed outdoors and away from the Old West Street set on Irving Street just below Melrose Avenue, the home of Filmaster television production company. Filmaster was located across the street from, later becoming part of, Paramount Studios' backlot. The area is now enclosed in the independent Kingsley Productions studio lot encompassing a city block. Beginning in season four, filming locations were often given in the closing credits. Locations included Bishop and Lone Pine, California; an area now known as Paladin Estates between Bend and Sisters, Oregon; and the Abbott Ranch near Prineville, Oregon.

=== Writing ===
Many of the writers who worked on Have Gun – Will Travel went on to gain fame elsewhere. Gene Roddenberry created Star Trek, Bruce Geller created Mission: Impossible, Samuel A. Peeples created The Tall Man, Custer, and Lancer, and Harold Jack Bloom created Boone's later series Hec Ramsey and the 1970s medical-adventure series Emergency! Harry Julian Fink is one of the writers who created Dirty Harry (the opening title and theme scene of the 1973 Dirty Harry sequel Magnum Force features a Paladin-like sequence of a handgun being slowly cocked and then finally pointed toward the camera, with a potent line of dialogue). Sam Peckinpah wrote one episode, "The Singer", which aired in 1958. Other notable writers who contributed an episode include Gene L. Coon, Richard Matheson, Charles Beaumont, Laurence Heath, and Fred Freiberger. Both Star Trek and Mission: Impossible were produced by Desilu Productions and later Paramount Television, which also now owns the rights to Have Gun – Will Travel through its successor company, CBS Television Distribution.

=== Music ===
The program's opening was a four-note motif composed and conducted by Bernard Herrmann. For the opening theme, Herrmann reused a short sequence he had previously composed for the 1951 movie On Dangerous Ground, starring Robert Ryan and Ida Lupino. The Have Gun – Will Travel theme (and fragments of incidental music also used in the television series) are featured in a chase scene across snowy fields; at the 35:25 mark of the film, the actual Have Gun – Will Travel opening theme is played in recognizable form, although the scoring is slightly different from the better-known television version.

The show's closing song, "The Ballad of Paladin", was written by Johnny Western (who had a role in season one, episode 35, "The Return of Dr. Thackeray"), Richard Boone, and program creator Sam Rolfe, and was performed by Western. In the first season, the closing song was a reprise of the opening theme. In syndication, the first (premise) episode concludes with the Johnny Western ballad. The rest of the first-season episodes play a reprise of the opening theme; although the theme song was used in closing at least four times in season one, including episodes 25, 30, 33, and 34.

In the second season, the song was the only closing music. In the third season, a new lyric was added to the five-line "The Ballad of Paladin", making it six lines long. In 1962–1963, the final season, the song's lyrics were cut to four lines, the original fourth and added sixth being dropped. This occurred because the production credits for writer, producer, and director were pulled from the closing credits to appear over the opening sequences. However, in the season-six episode "Sweet Lady in the Moon" (episode 26, 1963), the ballad was played complete over the closing credits.

Johnny Western has sung a fully recorded version, opening with the refrain and including a second verse never heard on the television series.

== Themes and analysis ==
=== Title ===
The title is a variation on a cliche used in personal advertisements in newspapers such as The Times, indicating that the advertiser (a job seeker) is equipped for a certain category of jobs and flexible about the location of the job. It has been used this way from the early 20th century.

A trope common in theatrical advertising at the time was "Have tux, will travel" (originally from comedian Bob Hope in 1954), and CBS has claimed this was the specific inspiration for the writer Herb Meadow. The television show popularized the phrase in the 1950s and 1960s, and many variations have been used as titles for other works, including the 1958 science-fiction novel Have Space Suit—Will Travel by Robert A. Heinlein.

=== Opening sequence ===
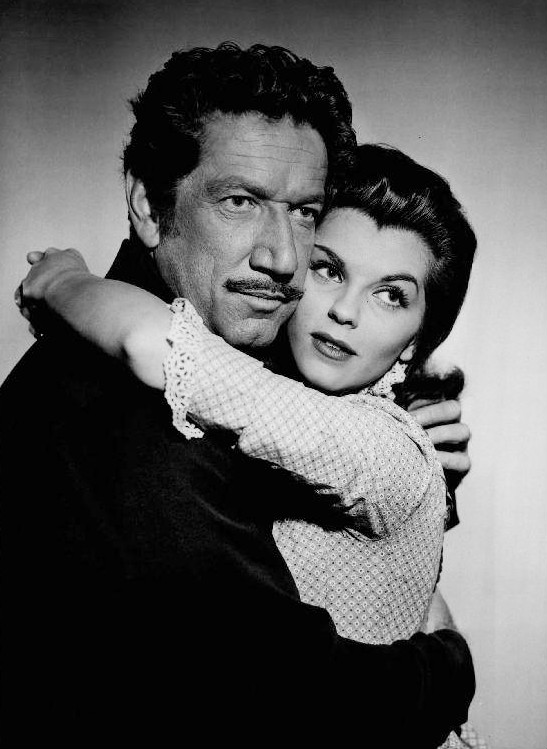
With Lisa Gaye, 1958

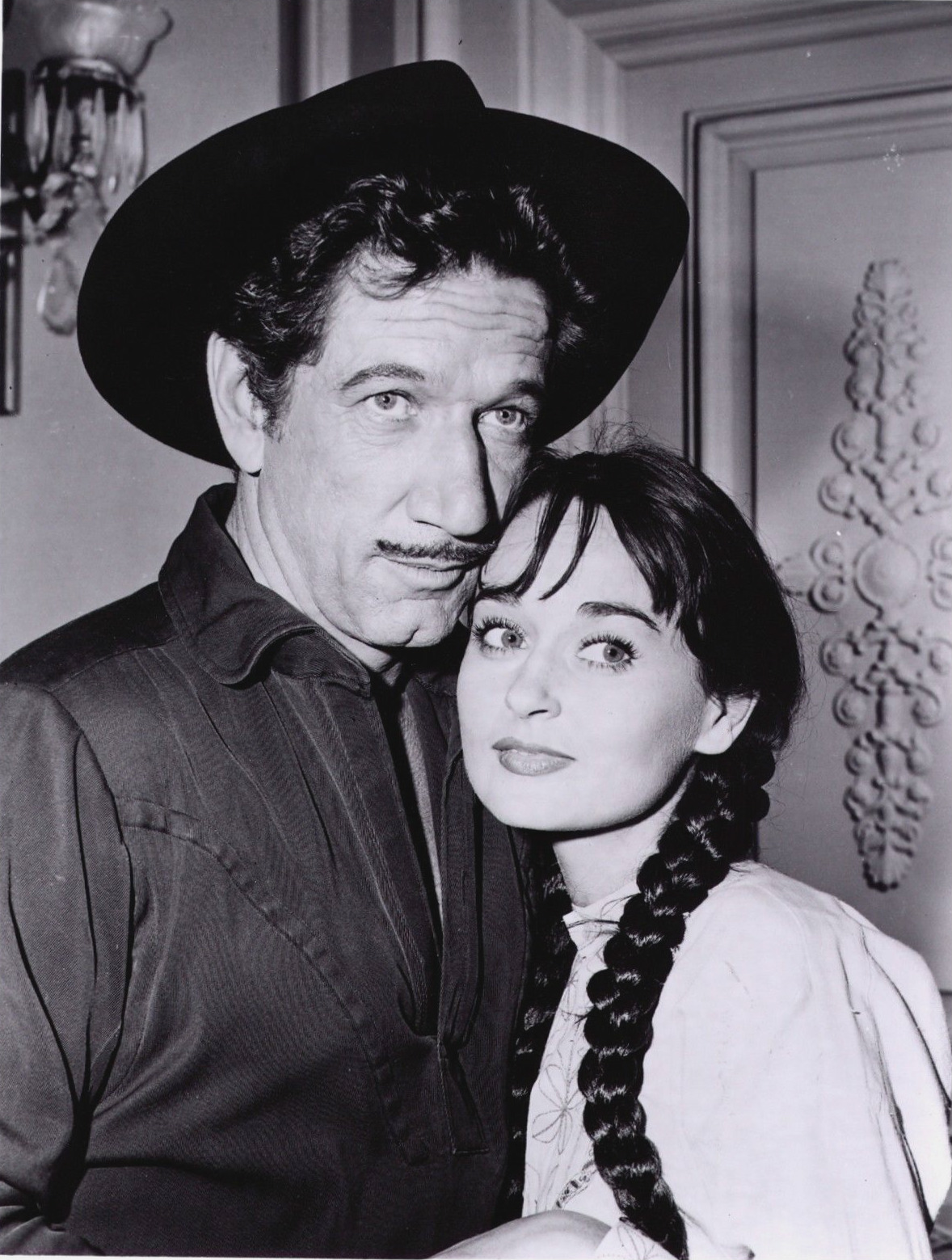
With Roxane Berard, who appeared in three episodes

Originally, each show opened with the same 45-second visual. Over a slow, four-note-repeat backbeat score, a tight shot of Paladin's chess knight emblem centered in a black background is seen, before the view widens to show the emblem affixed to Paladin's holster, with Paladin in his trademark costume seen from waist level in profile. Then, as he draws his revolver from the holster, the four-note-repeat backbeat fades to a light, almost harp-like strumming. He cocks the hammer, and then rotates the gun to point the barrel at the viewer for ten seconds, often delivering a line of dialogue from the coming episode, after which the pistol is uncocked and holstered briskly. As the weapon is reholstered and the view tightens to show only the chess knight, again, the four-note-repeat backbeat returns.

As only the chess knight emblem in a black background is back, the name "RICHARD BOONE" appears across the screen for about five seconds. The name fades out and immediately the words "in HAVE GUN – WILL TRAVEL" fade in, again for about five seconds. Boone's name and the show's title are accompanied by a four-note "stinger" that overshadows the four-note-repeat. The "stinger" is roughly the same as that heard when Paladin's business card is flashed on screen (in almost every episode). The words fade away after those five seconds, leaving only the chess knight emblem against the black background, and the four-note-repeat fades out. This opening then fades out and the show fades in on its opening scene.

A later version of the opening sequence (seasons three to six) has a long-range shot, with Paladin in a full-body profile silhouette, and he fast-draws the revolver, dropping into a slight crouch as he turns, pointing at the camera. After the dubbed-over line, he straightens as he shoves the firearm into his holster. This silhouette visual remained for the run of the series. In later episodes, the teaser line was dropped; as seen in many of the episodes of the final two seasons' opening titles, when Paladin crouches and points his gun at the camera, first "RICHARD BOONE", and then "HAVE GUN – WILL TRAVEL" would appear as before, and Boone would reholster his gun as the words faded out. Due to the networks not always airing episodes in the order they were filmed, the omission of the voice-over dialogue was inconsistent for some of the episodes, as seen in the opening titles. Season six did have the most opening titles without the voice-over dialogue, especially as the season progressed, again as seen when the episodes opened.

== Release ==
=== Broadcast history and ratings ===
September 14, 1957 – September 21, 1963: Saturdays at 9:30 pm

Season	Episodes	Originally released		Rank	Average viewership (in millions)
Season	Episodes	First released	Last released	Rank	Average viewership (in millions)
1	39	September 14, 1957	June 14, 1958	4	14.1
2	39	September 13, 1958	June 20, 1959	3	15.1
3	39	September 12, 1959	June 18, 1960	3	15.9
4	38	September 10, 1960	June 10, 1961	3	14.6
5	38	September 16, 1961	June 2, 1962	29	10.8
6	32	September 15, 1962	April 20, 1963	29	10.5

=== Home media ===
All of the episodes were released on VHS by Columbia House. CBS DVD (distributed by Paramount) has released all six seasons of Have Gun – Will Travel on DVD in Region 1. Season six, volumes one and two were first released on May 7, 2013.

On May 10, 2016, CBS DVD was to release Have Gun – Will Travel – The Complete Series on DVD in Region 1.

In the second-season DVD, two episodes are mislabeled. On disk three, the episode titled "Treasure Trail" is actually "Hunt the Man Down", and on disk four, "Hunt the Man Down" is "Treasure Trail"; the "Wire Paladin" in each case refers to the other episode.

DVD name	Ep #	Release date
Season 1	39	May 11, 2004
Season 2	39	May 10, 2005
Season 3	39	January 3, 2006
Season 4- Volume 1	19	March 2, 2010
Season 4- Volume 2	19	July 6, 2010
Season 5- Volume 1	19	November 30, 2010
Season 5- Volume 2	19	February 22, 2011
Season 6- Volume 1	16	May 7, 2013
Season 6- Volume 2	16	May 7, 2013
Complete Series	225	May 10, 2016

== Awards ==
The television show was nominated for three Emmy Awards:

- Best Actor in a Leading Role (Continuing Character) in a Dramatic Series, for Richard Boone (1959)
- Best Western Series (1959)
- Outstanding Performance by an Actor in a Series (Lead or Support), for Richard Boone (1960).

In 1957, Gene Roddenberry received the Writers Guild of America Award for Best Original Script for the episode "Helen of Abajinian".

== Franchise in other media ==
=== Radio show ===
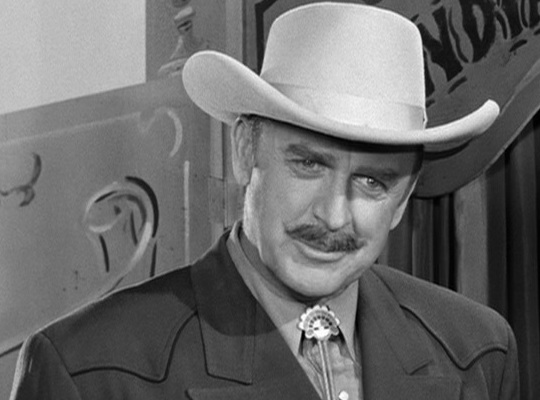
John Dehner

The Have Gun – Will Travel radio show broadcast 106 episodes on the CBS Radio Network between November 23, 1958, and November 27, 1960. It was one of the last radio dramas featuring continuing characters and one of only a handful of American radio adaptations of a television series. John Dehner (a regular on the radio series version of Gunsmoke) played Paladin, and Ben Wright usually (but not always) played Hey Boy. Virginia Gregg played Miss Wong, Hey Boy's girlfriend, before the television series featured the character of Hey Girl. Unlike the small-screen version, this medium usually had a tag scene at the Carlton at both the beginning and the end of the episode. Initially, the episodes were adaptations of the television program as broadcast earlier the same week, but eventually, original stories were produced, including a finale ("From Here to Boston", "Inheritance", and "Goodbye, Paladin") in which Paladin leaves San Francisco, perhaps forever, to claim an inheritance back east. The radio version was written by producer/writer Roy Winsor.

=== Books ===
Three novels were based on the television show, all with the title of the show. The first was a hardback written for children, published by Whitman in 1959 in a series of novelizations of television shows. It was written by Barlow Meyers and illustrated by Nichols S. Firfires. The second was a 1960 paperback original, written for adults by Noel Loomis. The last book, A Man Called Paladin, written by Frank C. Robertson and published in 1963 by Collier-Macmillan in hardback and paperback, is based on the television episode "Genesis" by Frank Rolfe.

This novel is the only source wherein a name is given to the Paladin character, Clay Alexander, but some fans of the series do not consider this name canonical. Dell Comics published a number of comic books with original stories based on the television series. In 2000, Martin Grams, Jr. and Les Rayburn self-published the 500-page trade paperback, The Have Gun – Will Travel Companion, documenting the history of the radio and television series.

=== Film ===
In February 1993, it was reported that Savoy Pictures had obtained the rights to Have Gun – Will Travel from CBS Entertainment to be developed as a feature film to be produced by Ray Stark's Rastar Productions and Jerry Leider. By April of that year, it was reported that the screenplay was being written by Bill Kirby and Alec Baldwin was attached to star. By August 1996, it was reported that the feature film version of Have Gun – Will Travel was no longer at Savoy and was now in development at Warner Bros. with the studio announcing its intention of formally greenlighting the film that same month. In March 1997, it was reported that Andrew Davis was in negotiations to direct the film with John Travolta in the lead. By May of that year, Davis had been confirmed as director and Larry Ferguson was writing the script. By March 1998, it was reported that Davis and Travolta iteration of the project had collapsed and the film had re-entered development as part of a pact between Warner Bros. and Steven Reuther's Bel Air Entertainment.

In 2006, a Have Gun – Will Travel film starring rapper Eminem was announced to be in production, but the film does not hold an official confirmed release date. Paramount Pictures extended an 18-month option on the television series and planned to transform the character of Paladin into a modern-day bounty hunter. Eminem was expected to work on the soundtrack.

=== Television reboot ===
In August 2012, several venues announced that David Mamet was developing a reboot of the television series for CBS.

=== In other television series ===
In the television series Maverick, season two, episode 16, "Gun Shy", a send-up of the television series Gunsmoke, Marshal Mort Dooley, the marshal of Elwood, Kansas, comments that several strange people have been passing through his town lately, specifically referring to "that gunslinger who handed out business cards". A subsequent comedic Maverick episode titled "The Cats of Paradise" features a black-clad character obviously based on Paladin, albeit without using the name. Both episodes star James Garner.

In the 1962 Tom and Jerry cartoon "Tall in the Trap", Tom rolls into town on spurs with a card reading "Tall in the Trap" showing a mousetrap on a knight chess piece. In the third episode of the seventh season of Archer ("Deadly Prep," April 14, 2016) the titular character is seen cleaning his weapon as he sings the theme song from Have Gun - Will Travel.

== Cultural influences ==
VFA-105 insignia

- The US Navy's Strike Fighter Squadron 105 (VFA-105), nicknamed "Gunslingers", wears a unit insignia featuring a western-style revolver in a holster emblazoned with a gold knight chess piece (although unlike Paladin's holster, the horse faces forward).
- Boon, a hit British Drama series, was heavily influenced by Have Gun – Will Travel. The series followed the adventures an ex-fireman who was invalided out of the service and became a modern-day hero. Of Have Gun – Will Travel's influence, co-creator Jim Hill said: "Boon had been derived from an American TV series from the 1950s that Bill Stair and I both watched and liked. It was called Have Gun – Will Travel – a troubleshooting cowboy answered distress calls. He was called Paladin and was played by the actor Richard Boone. We dropped the E and we had BOON – a modern-day trouble shooter on a motorbike instead of a steed." Boon ran from 1986 to 1992, with a special one-off episode in 1995.
- The "Have...Will..." theme was used in the titles of several record albums, such as Have Trumpet, Will Excite! by jazz musician Dizzy Gillespie, Have Organ Will Swing by pianist/organist Buddy Cole, Have Organ Will Travel by organist George Wright, multiple albums named Have Guitar Will Travel, and others.
- In a scene in Stand by Me, the main characters sing the show's closing theme song as a way of evoking that film's era (it is set in late 1959); songwriter Johnny Western successfully sued the producers for not securing his permission beforehand. This scene is spoofed in the "Stand by Me" segment of the Family Guy episode "Three Kings".
- The Tom and Jerry cartoon "Tall in the Trap" (1962, directed by Gene Deitch) was a parody of Have Gun – Will Travel.
- A feature of Frank Zappa's 1970 tour's performances was the "Paladin Routine", a brief improvised comedy sketch based on the Have Gun – Will Travel characters, culminating in a vocalization of the music from the series' opening-credit sequence. One such performance is documented on the bootleg album Freaks & Motherfu*#@%! (later released as part of Beat the Boots).
- In the third season, episode three of Downton Abbey, aired January 6, 2013, in what appears to be an anachronism, the character Lady Cora tells her husband, "I'm American: have gun, will travel", but the general phrase "Have X will travel" does date back to the show's time period.
- In the 1972–74 series Hec Ramsey, set in New Prospect, Oklahoma, in 1901, Boone is an older former gunfighter turned forensic criminologist. At one point, Ramsey denies that in his younger days as a gunfighter, he worked under the name Paladin. The origin of this myth is Boone's remark in an interview, "Hec Ramsey is Paladin – only fatter." Naturally, he merely meant the characters had certain similarities: Ramsey, for his part, was practically buffoonish, imparting a measure of humor to Hec Ramsey missing from the sterner, more erudite Paladin.
- In the two-part 1991 TV miniseries The Gambler Returns: The Luck of the Draw, a poker game is played by the rules of "the late Mr. Paladin" in the Carlton Hotel where the recently deceased Paladin usually stayed; the film featured numerous cowboy actors from 1950s television series playing their earlier roles in cameo appearances three decades later, along with Claude Akins as President Theodore Roosevelt turning up at the game to assist in memorializing Paladin.
- In the 1985 Star Trek novel Ishmael by Barbara Hambly, in which the Enterprise travels back in time, Spock plays chess against Paladin during a visit to San Francisco.
- In the 2013 fan-created series Star Trek Continues episode "Pilgrim of Eternity", visual effects artist Doug Drexler played the part of Paladin in a Holodeck creation. Drexler cited the special specifications of Paladin's revolver to an impressed Captain Kirk (Vic Mignogna).
- Paying homage to Boone's character, in the Pathfinder Roleplaying Game, the Paladin features an archetype named "Holy Gun", whose abilities are succinctly described as "Have Gun".
- Desmond Bagley's 1968 novel The Vivero Letter has a moment when the protagonist/narrator, thinking about what he is getting into, ironically describes himself as an "adventurer at large – 'have gun, will travel'." Then he notes that he does not have a gun and said, "I doubted whether I could use one effectively, anyway."
- Have Space Suit—Will Travel is a 1958 science fiction novel for young readers by American writer Robert A. Heinlein.

== Τrademark infringement litigation ==
In 1974, a rodeo performer named Victor De Costa won a federal court judgment against CBS for trademark infringement, successfully arguing that he had created the Paladin character and the ideas used in the show, and that CBS had used them without permission. For example, at his rodeo appearances he always dressed in black, called himself the "Paladin", handed out hundreds of business cards featuring a chess piece logo along with the phrase "Have gun will travel", and carried a concealed derringer pistol. A year later, an appellate court overturned the lower court ruling on the basis that the plaintiff had failed to prove that likelihood of confusion had existed in the minds of the public—a necessary requirement for a suit over trademark infringement. In 1977, De Costa was awarded a federal trademark for the Paladin character.

De Costa kept pursuing his legal options, and in 1991—more than 30 years after his first lawsuit was originally filed—a federal jury awarded DeCosta $3.5 million from Viacom International, by then a CBS subsidiary, which has distributed the show's reruns in defiance of De Costa's registered trademark, ordering Viacom to pay DeCosta $1 million for his loss and $2.5 million in punitive damages. Rhode Island District Judge Ernest C. Torres blocked the redistribution of the Paladin show by Viacom.

In 1992, the jury award was reversed. The United States Court of Appeals ruled that because Mr. DeCosta had unsuccessfully sued in the past over the same issues, "the doctrine of 'collateral estoppel' bars his new claims." In other words, he was not allowed a second attempt to try the old, previously settled dispute.

De Costa died on 29 January 1993 at the age of 84. In the end, he received nothing.

== Bibliography ==
- Have Gun – Will Travel Companion by Martin Grams, Jr. and Les Rayburn. OTR Publishing, 2001. ISBN 0970331002.
