= Claman =

Claman is a surname. Notable people with the surname include:

- Dolores Claman (1927–2021), Canadian composer and pianist
- Julian Claman (1918–1969), American actor
- Liz Claman (born 1963), American television journalist
- Matt Claman (born 1959), American politician
- Zachary Claman DeMelo (born 1998), Canadian race car driver
