= The Subject Is Jazz =

The Subject is Jazz was a television program that aired on NBC in 1958. It was produced in cooperation with the Educational Television and Radio Center. Hosted by Gilbert Seldes with the musical direction of Billy Taylor, the show featured prominent jazz performers.

One episode featured Ed Thigpen playing drums with his hands with Billy Taylor on piano. Other episodes featured Duke Ellington, Wilbur de Paris, Aaron Copland, Johnny "Hammond" Smith, Willis Conover, Lee Konitz, Cannonball Adderley, Willie "The Lion" Smith, Marshall Stearns and others.
