= Sawdust Caesar =

1935 book by George Seldes

Sawdust Caesar: The Untold History of Mussolini and Fascism
- Author: George Seldes
- Published: 1935
- Publisher: Harper
- ISBN: 0404561977

Sawdust Caesar: The Untold History of Mussolini and Fascism is a 1935 biography of Benito Mussolini and a history of the rise of fascism in Italy by American investigative journalist George Seldes.

== Reviews ==
A 1936 review in American Political Science Review stated: "Here, as the title indicates, is a piece of sensational journalism rather than of scientific analysis. Such a remark, however, is not meant in condemnation; for there is a considerable measure of usefulness in Seldes' contribution, considering all the extraordinary circumstances."
