= Tell the Truth and Run: George Seldes and the American Press =

1996 film

- Directed by: Rick Goldsmith
- Written by: Rick Goldsmith; Sharon Wood
- Produced by: Rick Goldsmith; Bill Jersey; Ruthie Sakheim; Laura Stuchinsky
- Starring: George Seldes, Ben Bagdikian, Ralph Nader, Victor Navasky, Daniel Ellsberg, Nat Hentoff, Marian Seldes, Timothy Seldes, Morton Mintz, Jeff Cohen, Colman McCarthy
- Narrated by: Susan Sarandon
- Cinematography: Stephen Lighthill, Will Parrinello
- Edited by: Rick Goldsmith
- Music by: Jon Herbst
- Distributed by: New Day Films
- Release date: 1996
- Running time: 111 minutes
- Country: United States
- Language: English

Tell the Truth and Run: George Seldes and the American Press is a 1996 documentary film about the author and critic George Seldes directed by Rick Goldsmith. It was nominated for an Academy Award for Best Documentary Feature.

== Critical reception ==
Todd McCarthy from Variety wrote "The supreme iconoclast among 20th century American journalists, George Seldes, receives a well-earned, enthusiastic tribute in this useful documentary, even if the portrait feels somewhat incomplete. Currently on the fest and benefit circuit, pic is viable for short theatrical stints in situations open to political, historical and, tangentially, Jewish-themed fare, but will have a much longer life on public TV, cable and video."
