= Father's Day (play) =

1971 play by Oliver Hailey

- Written by: Oliver Hailey

Premiere
- Date premiered: March 16, 1971

Father's Day is a 1971 play written by Oliver Hailey. The play is a "dark comedy" that follows three divorced women who reside in the same apartment building, exploring their post-divorce lives and their relationships with their ex-husbands.

It was first produced on Broadway and opened at the John Golden Theatre on March 16, 1971. The Broadway production was directed by Donald Moffat, and starred Ken Kercheval as Harold, Biff McGuire as Tom, Moffat as Richard, Jennifer Salt as Estelle, Marian Seldes as Marian, and Brenda Vaccaro as Louise. The production closed on the same day it opened, playing a total of 16 previews and one regular performance. Despite its short run, the production received nominations for Best Actress in a Play (Seldes) and Best Scenic Design (Jo Mielziner) at the 25th Tony Awards.

While the original Broadway production of Father's Day was panned by critics, Hailey continued to revise the show with subsequent revivals outside of Broadway that received more positive reviews.
