= Marian Seldes =

American actress (1928–2014)

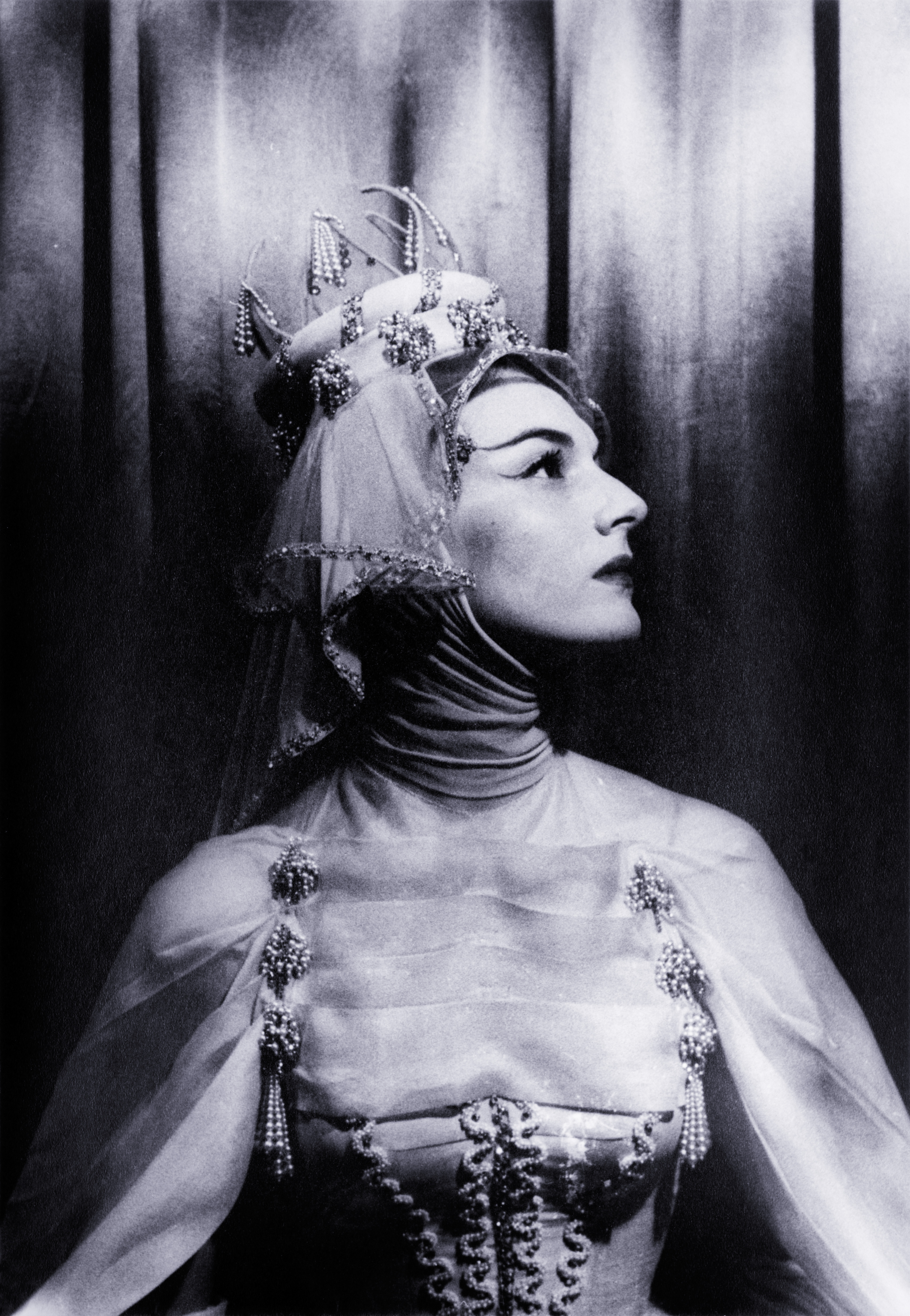
- Seldes in Ondine (1954)
- Born: Marian Hall Seldes; August 23, 1928; New York City, U.S.
- Died: October 6, 2014 (aged 86); New York City, U.S.
- Occupation: Actress
- Years active: 1948–2011
- Spouses: Julian Claman (m. 1953; div. 1961) Garson Kanin (m. 1990; died 1999)
- Children: 1
- Parent: Gilbert Seldes (father)
- Relatives: George Seldes (uncle)

Marian Hall Seldes (August 23, 1928 – October 6, 2014) was an American actress. A five-time Tony Award nominee, she won the Tony Award for Best Featured Actress in a Play for A Delicate Balance in 1967, and received subsequent nominations for Father's Day (1971), Deathtrap (1978), Ring Round the Moon (1999), and Dinner at Eight (2003). She also won a Drama Desk Award for Father's Day.

Her other Broadway credits include Equus (1974–77), Ivanov (1997), and Deuce (2007). She was inducted into the American Theater Hall of Fame in 1995 and received the Special Tony Award for Lifetime Achievement in 2010.

== Early life ==
Seldes was born in Manhattan, the daughter of Alice Wadhams Hall, a socialite, and Gilbert Seldes, a journalist, author, and editor. Her uncle was journalist George Seldes. She had one brother, Timothy. Seldes's paternal grandparents were Russian-Jewish immigrants, and her mother was from a "prominent WASP family," the "Episcopalian blue-blooded Halls." She grew up in a creative environment, studying acting at the Neighborhood Playhouse. Her maternal aunt, Marian Wells Hall, was a prominent interior decorator.

== Career ==
Trained for the stage, Seldes made her Broadway debut in 1948 in a production of Medea. She went on to an illustrious career in which she earned five Tony Award nominations, winning her first time out in 1967 for A Delicate Balance. In addition to performing in live theatre, Seldes began acting in television in 1952 in a Hallmark Hall of Fame production that marked the first of many guest star roles. She also performed in a number of movies and in radio plays. In the mid-1960s, Seldes recorded five albums for Folkways Records of famous works of literature, including two recordings of poetry by Robinson Jeffers. Between 1974 and 1982, she appeared in 179 episodes of the CBS Radio Mystery Theater. In 1992, she appeared in an episode of Murphy Brown as the title character’s eccentric Aunt Brooke.

Seldes studied with Sanford Meisner, Katharine Cornell, and Martha Graham. Actor Laura Linney said "Marian is our touchstone to those theatrical ancestors. She provides an inspiration that makes you want to reach outside of yourself to something more potent and powerful." Seldes was a member of the drama faculty of The Juilliard School from 1967 to 1991. Her students included Christopher Reeve, Robin Williams, Kelsey Grammer, Kevin Kline, William Hurt, Patti LuPone, Val Kilmer, and Kevin Spacey. In 2002, Seldes began teaching at Fordham University, Lincoln Center.

Seldes acted in Half Hour to Kill playing Joyce Field. Half Hour to Kill was a proposed but unrealized television series mystery show with episodes hosted by Vincent Price and planned to occasionally star him as well. Released to the home movie market as Freedom to Get Lost, with Price playing scientist Gene Wolcott and Seldes playing an undercover security agent tracking him. The episode is available on the DVD titled Vincent Price – The Sinister Image. (1958)

Seldes appeared in every one of the 1,809 Broadway performances of Ira Levin's play Deathtrap, a feat that earned her a mention in the Guinness Book of World Records as "most durable actress". Seldes was also well known for her readings of short stories in the "Selected Shorts" series hosted by Isaiah Sheffer at New York City's Symphony Space.

In December 2008, for their annual birthday celebration to "The Master", Noël Coward, the Noël Coward Society invited Seldes as the guest celebrity to lay flowers in front of Coward's statue at New York's Gershwin Theatre, thereby commemorating the playwright’s 109th birthday. Seldes was the recipient of a 2010 Tony Lifetime Achievement Award. "All I've done is live my life in the theater and loved it ... If you can get an award for being happy, that's what I've got."

In 2012, Seldes played the knife-wielding socialite Mabel Billingsly in the film adaptation of Wendy Mass' popular children's book Jeremy Fink and the Meaning of Life, written and directed by Tamar Halpern.

== Personal life ==
Seldes had one child, Katharine, by her first marriage to Julian Claman. They were divorced in 1961. Seldes stated that the marriage to Claman was violent. "If I sound a little vague about that marriage, it's because I don't understand the person in it. Me. I literally didn't know that people could be abusive." Seldes left the marriage after her father noticed marks on her face. Seldes was married to screenwriter/playwright Garson Kanin from 1990 until his death in 1999.

== Death ==
Seldes died at age 86 on October 6, 2014, in Manhattan of Alzheimer's.

However, in 2017, it was reported that a documentary about her life, Marian, by director R.E. "Rick" Rodgers, chronicling Seldes' last years, had created "consternation in the theater world" as a "horrific, intrusive depiction of her slide into dementia".

== Acting credits ==
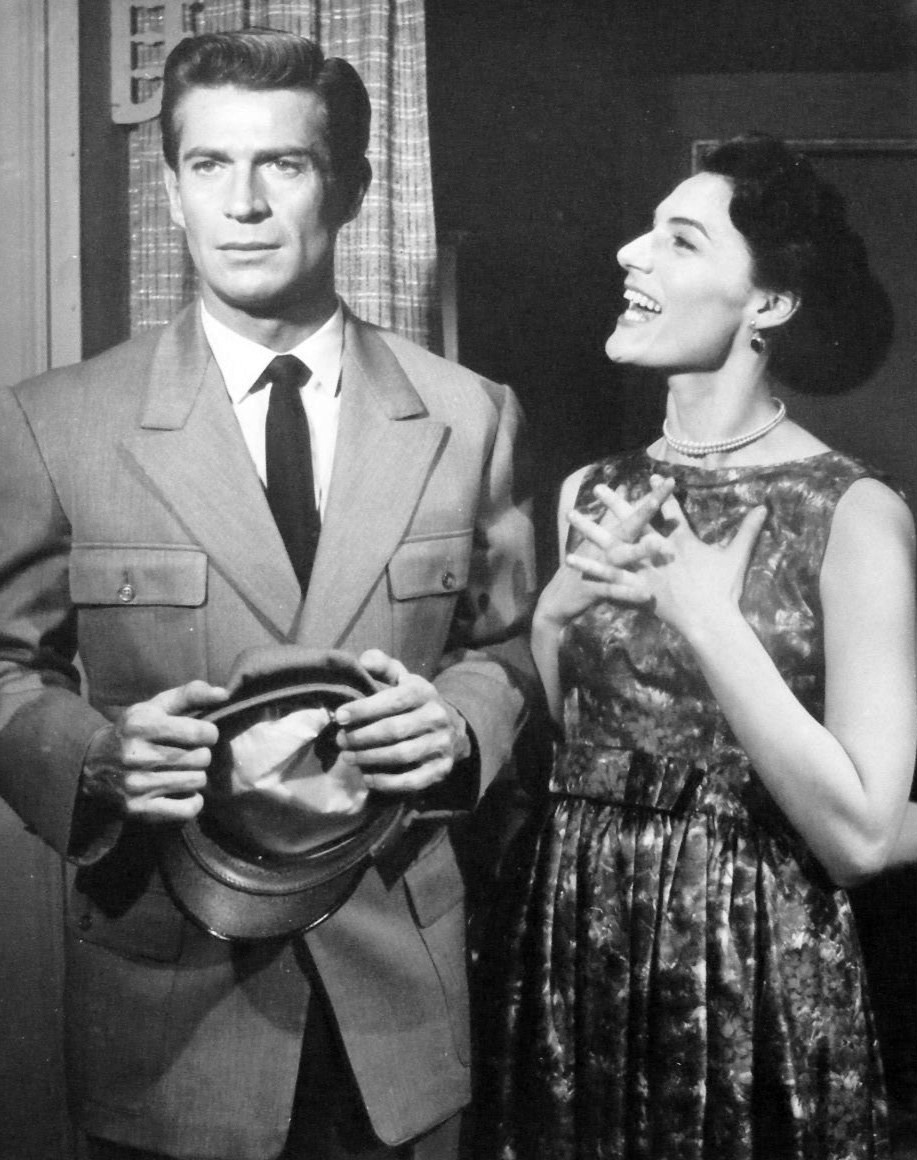
George Nader and Seldes in The Further Adventures of Ellery Queen, 1959

=== Films ===
| Year | Title | Role | Notes | Ref. |
|---|---|---|---|---|
| 1958 | The Light in the Forest | Kate Owens | | |
| 1959 | Crime and Punishment U.S.A. | Debbie Cole | | |
| 1959 | The Big Fisherman | Arnon | | |
| 1965 | The Greatest Story Ever Told | Herodias | | |
| 1978 | Fingers | Ruth | | |
| 1992 | The Gun in Betty Lou's Handbag | Margaret Armstrong | | |
| 1995 | Truman | Eleanor Roosevelt | | |
| 1995 | Tom and Huck | Widow Douglas | | |
| 1996 | Tell the Truth and Run: George Seldes and the American Press | Herself | Documentary | |
| 1997 | Affliction | Alma Pittman | | |
| 1997 | Home Alone 3 | Mrs. Greta Hess | | |
| 1997 | Digging to China | Leah Schroth | | |
| 1999 | The Haunting | Mrs. Dudley | | |
| 2000 | If These Walls Could Talk 2 | Abby Hedley | HBO film | |
| 2000 | Duets | Harriet Gahagan | | |
| 2001 | Town & Country | Eugenie's Mother | | |
| 2003 | Mona Lisa Smile | President Jocelyn Carr | | |
| 2004 | Proteus | Narrator | | |
| 2005 | Ballets Russes | Narrator | | |
| 2007 | August Rush | Dean Alice McNeille | | |
| 2007 | The Visitor | Barbara | | |
| 2008 | Leatherheads | Clerk | | |
| 2010 | The Extra Man | Vivian Cudlip | | |

=== Television ===
| Year | Title | Role | Notes | Ref. |
|---|---|---|---|---|
| 1950 | Our Sister Emily | Emily Brontë | Television debut; TV movie | |
| 1951 | Sure As Fate | Lady Macduff | Episode: Macbeth | |
| 1953 | Westinghouse Studio One | Bell Giles | Episode: "The Laugh Maker" | |
| 1956 | Gunsmoke | Mrs. Cullen | Episode: "Indian White" | |
| 1957 | Have Gun – Will Travel | Christie Smith | Episode: "The Bride" | |
| 1958 | Have Gun – Will Travel | Mollie Stanton | Episode: "The Teacher" | |
| 1958 | Perry Mason | Mary K. Davis | Episode: "The Case of the Screaming Woman" | |
| 1958 | The Court of Last Resort | Roberta Farrell | Episode: "The Frank Clark Case" (1958) | |
| 1958 | The Court of Last Resort | Mary Morales | Episode: "The Mary Morales Case" | |
| 1958 | Half Hour to Kill | Joyce Field | Unrealized television series | |
| 1958 | Alfred Hitchcock Presents | Lydia Brailing | Episode: "Design For Loving" | |
| 1960 | The Rifleman | Hazel / Margaret | Episode: "The Vision" | |
| 1961 | Special for Women: The Glamour Trap | Plain Girl | Television film | |
| 1965 | Branded | Neela | Episode: "The Bar Sinister" | |
| 1991 | Good & Evil | Charlotte Sandler | 11 episodes | |
| 1991 | Law & Order | Suzanne | Episode: "God Bless the Child" | |
| 1991 | Who's the Boss | Nana Reynolds | Episode: "Grandmommie Dearest" | |
| 1992 | Murder, She Wrote | Lydia Winthrop | Episode: "The Witch's Curse" | |
| 1992 | Murphy Brown | Aunt Brooke | Episode: "I'm Dreaming of a Brown Christmas" | |
| 1995 | Wings | Eleanor Kingsbury | Episode: "Death Becomes Him" | |
| 1998 | One Life to Live | Sonya Carter | 1 episode | |
| 1996-1998 | Cosby | Elaine | 2 episodes | |
| 1998 | Sex and the City | Mrs. Big | Episode: "Oh Come All Ye Faithful" | |
| 2001 | A Nero Wolfe Mystery | Mrs. Robilotti | Episode: "Champagne for One" | |
| 2001 | A Nero Wolfe Mystery | Mrs. Pitcairn | Episode: "Door to Death" | |
| 2004 | Frasier | Betty, Ronee's mother | Episode: "Miss Right Now" | |
| 2007 | Law & Order: Special Victims Unit | Peggy Kendall | Episode: "Haystack" | |
| 2011 | Nurse Jackie | Tottie | Episode: "When the Saints Go" | |

=== Theatre ===
| Year | Title | Role | Venue | Ref. |
|---|---|---|---|---|
| 1947 | Medea | Attendant to Medea | National Theatre, Broadway | |
| 1947 | Crime and Punishment | Dounia | National Theatre, Broadway | |
| 1949 | Medea | Second Woman of Corinth | City Center, Broadway | |
| 1949 | That Lady | Anichu at 18 | Martin Beck Theatre, Broadway | |
| 1950 | The Tower Beyond Tragedy | Electra | ANTA Playhouse, Broadway | |
| 1951 | The High Ground | Nurse Phillips | 48th Street Theatre, Broadway | |
| 1954 | Ondine | Bertha | 46th Street Theatre, Broadway | |
| 1955 | The Chalk Garden | Olivia | Ethel Barrymore Theatre, Broadway | |
| 1960 | The Wall | Sympka Berson | Billy Rose Theatre, Broadway | |
| 1962 | A Gift of Time | Susan Loring | Ethel Barrymore Theatre, Broadway | |
| 1964 | The Milk Train Doesn't Stop Here Anymore | Blackie | Brooks Atkinson Theatre, Broadway | |
| 1964 | Tiny Alice | Miss Alice | Billy Rose Theatre, Broadway | |
| 1966 | A Delicate Balance | Julia | Martin Beck Theatre, Broadway | |
| 1968 | Before You Go | Woman | Henry Miller's Theatre, Broadway | |
| 1969 | Mercy Street | Daisy | Theater at St. Clement's Church, Off-Broadway | |
| 1971 | Father's Day | Marian | John Golden Theatre, Broadway | |
| 1974 | Next Time I'll Sing You | Director | Billy Rose Theatre, Broadway | |
| 1974 | Equus | Hester Saloman | Plymouth Theatre, Broadway | |
| 1977 | The Merchant | Rivka Folner | Plymouth Theatre, Broadway | |
| 1978 | Deathtrap | Myra Bruhl | Music Box Theatre, Broadway | |
| 1983 | Painting Churches | Fanny Church | South Street Theatre, Off-Broadway | |
| 1983 | Richard II | Margaret | Delacorte Theatre, Off-Broadway | |
| 1986 | Gertrude Stein and a Companion | Alice B. Toklas | Lucille Lortel Theatre, Off-Broadway | |
| 1993 | Three Tall Women | A | Vineyard Theatre, Off-Broadway | |
| 1997 | Ivanov | Zinaida Savishna | Vivian Beaumont Theatre, Broadway | |
| 1999 | Ring Round the Moon | Madame Desmermortes | Belasco Theatre, Broadway | |
| 2000 | The Torch-Bearers | J. Duro Pampinelli | Greenwich House, Off-Broadway | |
| 2001 | The Play About the Baby | Woman | Century Center For The Performing Arts | |
| 2001 | 45 Seconds from Broadway | Rayleen | Richard Rodgers Theatre, Broadway | |
| 2002 | Helen | Servant | The Public Theater, Off-Broadway | |
| 2003 | Dinner at Eight | Carlotta Vance | Vivian Beaumont Theatre, Broadway | |
| 2004 | The Royal Family | Fannie Cavandish | Ahmanson Theatre, Los Angeles | |
| 2005 | It's a Wonderful Life | Mrs. Hatch | Sam S. Shubert Theatre, Broadway | |
| 2005 | Dedication or The Stuff of Dreams | Annabelle Willard | 59E59 Theatre, Off-Broadway | |
| 2007 | Deuce | Midge Barker | Music Box Theatre, Broadway | |
| 2008 | La fille du régiment | The Duchess | Metropolitan Opera, Lincoln Center | |

=== Radio ===
- Theatre Guild on the Air: Played Julia in 1984 (1953)
- CBS Radio Mystery Theater (appeared in 206 episodes)

== Awards and nominations ==
| Year | Association | Category | Project | Result | Ref. |
|---|---|---|---|---|---|
| 1967 | Tony Award | Best Featured Actress in a Play | A Delicate Balance | Won | |
| 1971 | Tony Award | Best Actress in a Play | Father's Day | Nominated | |
| 1978 | Tony Award | Best Featured Actress in a Play | Deathtrap | Nominated | |
| 1999 | Tony Award | Best Actress in a Play | Ring Round the Moon | Nominated | |
| 2003 | Tony Award | Best Featured Actress in a Play | Dinner at Eight | Nominated | |
| 2010 | Tony Award | Tony Lifetime Achievement Award | | Received | |
| 1971 | Drama Desk Award | Outstanding Performance | Father's Day | Won | |
| 1998 | Drama Desk Award | Outstanding Featured Actress in a Play | Ivanov | Nominated | |
| 1999 | Drama Desk Award | Outstanding Featured Actress in a Play | Ring Round the Moon | Nominated | |
| 2001 | Drama Desk Award | Outstanding Featured Actress in a Play | The Butterfly Collection | Nominated | |
| 2001 | Drama Desk Award | Outstanding Actress in a Play | The Play About the Baby | Nominated | |
| 2006 | Drama Desk Award | Outstanding Featured Actress in a Play | Dedication or The Stuff of Dreams | Nominated | |
| 1964 | Obie Award | Distinguished Performance | The Ginger Man | Won | |
| 2001 | Obie Award | Sustained Achievement | | received | |
| 1983 | Outer Circle Critics Award | Best Actress in a Play | Painting Churches | Won | |

== Discography ==
- The Roan Stallion by Robinson Jeffers (1963)
- The Making of Americans by Gertrude Stein (1963
- Theodore Bikel: "Songs of Songs" and other Bible Prophecies featuring Marian Seldes as Shulamite (1964))
- Tower Beyond Tragedy by Robinson Jeffers (1964)
- Phèdre by Jean Racine (1964)
- Prayers from the Ark: French and English Poems (1964)
