= Paul Sills' Story Theatre =

Play

- Original language: English
- Written by: Paul Sills
- Subject: Grimms' Fairy Tales
- Genre: Comedy

Premiere
- Date: October 26, 1970
- Place: Ambassador Theatre; New York City

Paul Sills' Story Theatre is a play with music, adapted from fairy tales collected by the Brothers Grimm and Aesop's Fables.

== Productions ==
The Story Theatre debuted at 1848 N. Wells Street in Chicago during the summer of 1968. That building was the original location of The Second City, which had already moved to its new and current location at 1616 N. Wells St. After Sills finished doing Story Theater there, it was torn down. Story Theatre went on to play at the Yale Repertory Theatre and in Los Angeles. The Yale production was filmed as an episode of public television's NET Playhouse.

The Story Theatre opened on Broadway at the Ambassador Theatre on October 26, 1970 and closed on July 3, 1971, after 243 performances and 14 previews. Directed by Paul Sills, it featured Paul Sand, Valerie Harper, Richard Schaal, Peter Bonerz, Melinda Dillon, Richard Libertini and Hamilton Camp. Linda Lavin joined the cast as a replacement.

Sills and the company developed "Story Theatre" from actual fairy tales, using improvisational theater techniques they adapted from his mother’s (Viola Spolin) books and teachings. These techniques, under Sills direction evolved into The Second City in Chicago, the first improvisational theater company in the US and eventually into another outgrowth, Story Theatre. Transformation, mime, and dance are the basis of the "Story Theatre" method. Story Theatre improvises plays from stories, myths, folk tales, and legends.

The Story Theatre on Broadway was composed of 8 actors with a rock-folk band, "The True Brethren", enacting fairy tale stories. The stories included "The Bremen Town Musicians," "The Little Peasant," "The Robber Bridegroom," "The Master Thief," "The Fisherman and His Wife," "Two Crows," "The Golden Goose," "Henny Penny," and "Venus and the Cat". Each cast member portrayed the various characters in each story; for example, Paul Sand was the Robber Bridegroom, Turkey Lurkey, Cowherd and Rich Peasant, and the Simpleton.

Musical numbers featured "I'll Be Your Baby Tonight" and "Dear Landlord" by Bob Dylan, the Rolling Stones' "Sing This All Together", and "Here Comes The Sun" by George Harrison. Additional music was by "The True Brethren" (Hamilton Camp, Waqidi Falicoff, Raphael Grinage, Loren Pickford).

A television adaptation, produced in Canada for the CTV Television Network and featuring several cast members from the play, aired in 1971.

== Awards and nominations ==
Source: Playbill

- Tony Award
  - Best Play (Produced by Zev Buffman) (nominee)
  - Best Featured Actor in a Play—Paul Sand (winner)
  - Best Lighting Design—H. R. Poindexter (winner)
- Drama Desk Award
  - Outstanding Performance—Paul Sand (winner)
  - Outstanding Director—Adapted and Directed by Paul Sills (winner)
