= Have Guitar Will Travel =

Have Guitar Will Travel may refer to:

- Have Guitar Will Travel (Eddy Arnold album), 1959
- Have Guitar Will Travel (Bo Diddley album), 1960
- Have Guitar, Will Travel (Joe Perry album), 2009
  - Have Guitar, Will Travel Tour
