= Julian Claman =

American novelist

- Born: 1918; Brooklyn, New York, U.S.
- Died: April 24, 1969 (aged 50)
- Spouse: Marian Seldes (m. 1953; div. 1961)
- Children: 2

Julian Claman (1918 – April 24, 1969) was an American actor, war correspondent, press agent, stage manager, TV writer/producer, playwright, and novelist. He is well known for producing the TV series Have Gun – Will Travel (1957).

== Early years ==
Claman was born in Brooklyn. His father was Charles Cohen (or Charles Claman), and he had a brother, Harvey. During World War II he served in the Army in Europe and the Far East.

== Career ==
Claman wrote the novels Aging Boy (1964, cited in 2007 by Oscar-winning screenwriter/Pulitzer-winning author Larry McMurtry as a great lost novel) and The Malediction (1969). His first play A Quiet Place starred Tyrone Power and was directed by Delbert Mann. Claman wrote for the Mister Peepers TV series.

== Personal life ==
Claman was married from 1953 to 1961 to five-time Tony-nominated actress Marian Seldes, who appeared in two episodes of Have Gun – Will Travel (1957), the TV series he produced. Seldes and Claman's daughter Katharine (named after Broadway actress/producer Katharine Cornell) is a writer.

Claman was previously married to Phyllis Claman. Their daughter Elizabeth lives in Richmond, Calif. In 2020, Elizabeth Claman self-published her life story When Pigs Fly.

== Death ==
Claman died of a heart attack on April 24, 1969, in Memorial Hospital in New York City, aged 51.

== Novels and TV series ==
- Have Gun – Will Travel (1957), TV series, producer
- Mister Peepers, TV series, writer
- The Malediction (1969), novel, writer
- Studio One (1948), producer
- Jamie (1953), producer
- Playhouse 90, producer
- Studio One, producer
