= Gilbert Seldes =

American dramatist

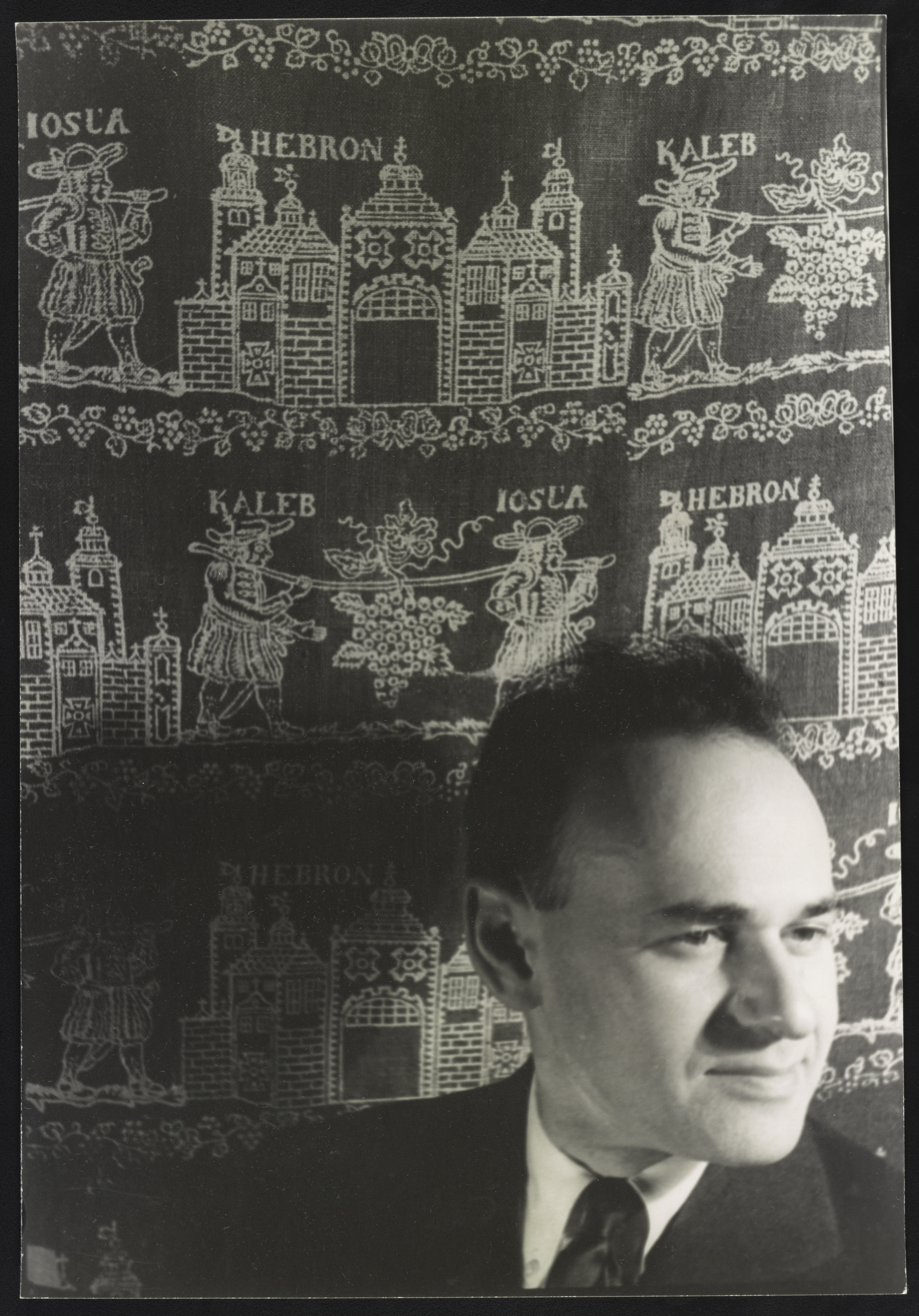
Gilbert Seldes photographed by Carl Van Vechten, 1932

Gilbert Vivian Seldes (/ˈsɛldəs/; January 3, 1893 – September 29, 1970) was an American writer and cultural critic. Seldes served as the editor and drama critic of the seminal modernist magazine The Dial and hosted the NBC television program The Subject is Jazz (1958). He also wrote for other magazines and newspapers like Vanity Fair and the Saturday Evening Post. He was most interested in American popular culture and cultural history. He wrote and adapted for Broadway, including Lysistrata and A Midsummer Night's Dream in the 1930s. Later, he made films, wrote radio scripts and became the first director of television for CBS News and the founding dean of the Annenberg School for Communication at the University of Pennsylvania.

He spent his career analyzing popular culture in America, advocating cultural democracy, and subsequently, calling for public criticism of the media. Near the end of his life, he quipped, "I've been carrying on a lover's quarrel with the popular arts for years ... It's been fun. Nothing like them."

== Early life ==
Gilbert Seldes was born on January 3, 1893, in Alliance, New Jersey, and attended a small elementary school in the 300-home farm community. Both Gilbert's parents were Russian Jewish immigrants, and his mother, Anna Saphro, died in 1896 when he and his older brother, famed war correspondent and journalist George Seldes, were still young. Gilbert's father, George Sergius Seldes, a strongly opinionated and radically philosophical man, affected every aspect of his young sons' lives. The elder George pushed his sons to "read books that you will reread—and that you will never outgrow," and refused to force religion upon children who were "too young to understand it," instilling a free-thinking attitude within his sons.

Seldes attended Philadelphia's Central High School and then enrolled in Harvard, concentrating on English Studies and graduating in 1914. During this time, he was a self-confessed 'cultural elitist'. It was here that Seldes met and befriended both Scofield Thayer and James Sibley Watson, Jr. along with E.E. Cummings, Winslow Wilson, Harold Stearns, and John Dos Passos. Upon graduation Seldes joined his brother as a war journalist from 1916 to 1917, eventually being promoted to sergeant. George Santayana's and William James' ideas also influenced him greatly during this time.

== Personal life and family ==
Seldes had a fling with the American journalist Jane Anderson from early 1918 to late 1919. They eventually drifted apart, and he married Alice Wadhams Hall, an upper-class Episcopalian, in Paris in 1924. The actress Marian Seldes was their daughter; their son is literary agent Timothy Seldes. He was the younger brother of legendary liberal journalist George Seldes.

== Ideas ==
=== On popular culture ===
Seldes' belief in the democratization of culture characterized his career. In the 1920s, he rejected conventional understandings of jazz, film, comics, vaudeville and Broadway as banal, immoral and aesthetically questionable. He did not limit art to its 'high-culture' normative of European forms like opera, ballet and classical music. He also did not believe that culture was inherently ordered, or that it demanded rigorous training to create and understand.

Instead, Seldes advocated a democratic aesthetic culture. He sought only to distinguish well-executed art from that which was not. He found 'excellence, mediocrity at all levels' and detested 'trash' of both the high- and low-class nature. Furthermore, he insisted that the dichotomy between the high and low brow was fundamentally complex. This distinction stemmed from class assumptions rather than a judgement of art's intrinsic value –

The lively arts are created and admired chiefly by the class known as lowbrows, are patronised and, to an extent enjoyed, by the highbrows; and are treated as impostors and as contemptible vulgarism by the middle class, those who invariably are ill at ease in the presence of great art until it has been approved by authority.

Unlike his contemporaries, therefore, he evaluated popular culture, introducing new sources like jazz, comics, film, television and radio to criticism. He praised them for their honesty, humour, and the technical skills of their performers. An anti-intellectual, he was also convinced that art, particularly popular entertainment, should avoid being overly cerebral and didactic. Subsequently, he staunchly opposed critics who recommended radio as a tool for formal education in the 1930s, saying, "no lessons, thank you, and no, damn you, no lectures".

Moreover, Seldes believed that intellectuals would discern a distinctive American culture if they abandoned their assumption that only European trappings conferred cultural legitimacy. To him, America already possessed its own heterogeneous, democratic and dynamic cultural heritage. In The Seven Lively Arts, Seldes stated that the language and rhythms of jazz reflected a distinct, home-grown American identity. America had found its 'characteristic expression' and had arrived 'at a point of creative intensity' through popular culture. He, therefore, advocated that American intellectuals not be ashamed of jazz, but reaffirm and support it instead.

This horrified the critics of The Dial, the magazine for which Seldes was managing editor. They derided him as pretentious and vulgar on many occasions. In response, Seldes was especially critical of American expatriates and critics who favored European art media and scorned American popular culture. He called them the "debunkers" and argued that European culture was not worthy of veneration. It had "foisted on us [America] feeble ideas, questionable taste, quackeries and crazes".

More importantly, he also objected to these expatriates' and critics' assertion that America had insufficient historical experience to inspire artistic creativity. From the 1930s, he became convinced that an historical understanding of America was fundamental to its self-identification. He, therefore, moved from art criticism to writing history to prove that America had a cultural past. This led to books like The Stammering Century and Mainland. By the 1930s, Seldes' writings took on heavier tones of American exceptionalism, which increased with the advent of World War II.

During the Great Depression, Seldes' belief that entertainment existed purely for its own sake evolved. He called for theatre to reflect the harsh realities of American life–

I do not mean that all the plays ought to be concerned with the farmers' strike in Iowa and the bread lines in New York, although I do not see why at least a few of the plays do not deal with these subjects. It is possible to be aware of what has happened in these three years and make your awareness felt even in light comedy.

The Years of the Locust (1933), his searing eyewitness account of the street-level devastations wrought by the Great Depression, reflects this concern. He grew more critical of serious plays, advocating light-hearted content that confronted and assuaged the struggles of everyday life. Ever the cultural populist, he maintained that American art should benefit American citizens.

Seldes' interests diversified to film from the late 1920s. Unlike critics like H. L. Mencken and George Jean Nathan who scorned films as vulgar, Seldes believed that film could be a tool for American historical education. He wrote, directed, produced and hosted a range of historical documentaries. This is America (1933) was his debut effort. Among film artists, Seldes praised Charlie Chaplin in particular; in 1924, he spoke of Chaplin as one of America's two great artists of the time, the other one being Krazy Kat cartoonist George Herriman.

From the outset, he was convinced that film's essential feature was also a defining American trait. This was its ability to capture "movement, and that happen[ed] to be the one dominant characteristic of all American history". He, therefore, believed that film was vital to America's cultural identity.

Alongside film's proliferation, Seldes promulgated the democratization of cultural criticism. He proposed that critical opinion needed to support film's reach to a mass audience, and applauded the rise of film criticism from the 1920s. For all of film's merits, however, Seldes also accurately predicted and lamented literary culture's decline in the 1930s as a result of film and television.

=== On mass culture ===
From the 1930s, Seldes was wary of the transformation of popular culture to mass culture, which television and radio facilitated. He was concerned that the popular arts had lost their dynamism as 'passive observation' had, by then, replaced 'active participation' in the arts. Furthermore, he worried that American tastes were becoming uniform and undiscriminating. This concern increased in the 1950s, as he saw that the arts were monopolized, homogenized, and of poor standard. In the second edition of The Seven Lively Arts (1957), he wrote, "we are being engulfed in a mass-produced mediocrity".

Media responsibility was also a pertinent issue to Seldes, as he believed that entertainment corporations' control and commercialization of the arts eroded the value of popular culture. He blamed media corporations for broadcasting content that he thought pandered to the lowest common denominator. He considered soap operas and TV dramas "corrupting influences". To Seldes, TV detrimentally narrowed the interests of the public, when, instead –

the public [should] be given every opportunity to find its own level of taste by having access to the best as well as to the mean – which in this case, is far from golden.

Moreover, he also rued how television's accessibility made entertainment seem like a 'right', rather than a reward to be earned.

Still, he remained optimistic and wished that the public would criticize the media. This was Seldes' enduring ideal – for American cultural criticism's democratization. The historian Michael Kammen considers Seldes the forerunner of the cultural studies for his research into the social impact, political implications and educational potential of cultural mediums. He also declared that he did not find sex as entertaining as virtue, honesty, realism, humor and technical skill in performance. He perceived its growing usage in entertainment (particularly in Hollywood) as a reflection of a decline of the media.

In early 1946, Seldes wrote an essay in Esquire magazine, where he criticized what he perceived to be the prevailing radio humor of the time. According to Seldes, most comedians on the airwaves based their humor almost solely on various insults, which he found tiresome. His essay led to an invitation on The Jack Benny Program to defend his stance, which he accepted. He appeared on Benny's radio program on February 24, 1946. Despite his objections to radio comedy, Seldes did enjoy appearing on the show, and recalled that Benny's writers "accomplished the miracle of making me seem very funny indeed".

=== On politics ===
While a patriot, Seldes was largely apolitical. He later regretted this neglect and he conceded that his material comforts had made him apathetic –

nothing in public affairs has caused me so much regret as my failure to join them. The only one that seems even faintly valid to myself is that I wasn't, by nature, a joiner of movements… In a sense, this absorption into a life I had never anticipated and the prosperity I enjoyed, could make me indifferent to public causes.

Before and during World War II, however, Seldes was completely committed to American exceptionalism. He emphasized the uniqueness of American culture and democracy against Europe's. Despite his populist inclinations, he was an anti-Communist. He believed that Communism was incompatible with America, as it required "complete self-dedication" at the expense of democratic suffrage. He saw Americans during the 1930s as generally apathetic and undisposed to rebellion. He, therefore, championed middle-class American concerns instead. These dominated Mainland (1936), Your Money or Your Life (1938) and Proclaim Liberty! (1942). He later considered his views during this period dogmatic, pedantic and isolationist.

=== On intellectual criticism ===
As an intellectual, Seldes sought not just to evaluate the arts and challenge other critics, but also aimed to inform the public. He saw himself as a 'constructive' critic rather than a 'destructive' one, differentiating himself from the detractors of American popular culture. He also alleged that they were too technical; they were critics "not of literature, but of economics, sociology, psychoanalysis, morality – and so on". Throughout his career, he favored fairness, balance and internationalism, and was, most of all, averse to providing only one-sided evidence that could mislead his readers.

== Career ==
=== Editor, writer and cultural critic ===
Following his graduation from Harvard University in 1914, Seldes left for London as the Philadelphia Evening Ledger's correspondent during World War I. He covered the social conditions in England. He also wrote for the Boston Evening Transcript, The Forum and New Statesman in London.

After the end of the war, Seldes returned to America and became Collier Weekly's associate editor. Seldes would become second associate editor for The Dial in 1920, often contributing how own pieces to the periodical under the pseudonyms Vivian Shaw or Sebastien Cauliflower. His long, glowing 1922 review in The Nation of Ulysses by James Joyce helped the book become known in the United States (although it would remain banned there until 1933). Seldes' tenure as editor of The Dial included the publication of the famous November 1922 issue featuring T. S. Eliot's The Waste Land. Together, they took The Dial on a modernist track, as opposed to other magazines like Van Wyck Brooks' The Freeman and Henry Luce's TIME. During this time, he worked with other intellectuals like Marianne Moore and Sophia Wittenberg (who later became Lewis Mumford's wife), who recounted him as an excellent colleague –

Gilbert was lighthearted and easy to get along with. Though he was serious about his work, which he seemed to enjoy, I would not say he was intellectually intense… The Dial in its early days, and I was there in one capacity or another from the start, was conducted in the office along rather informal lines with a general camaraderie, and Gilbert did much to foster that. I think he thoroughly enjoyed his work.

Vanity Fair named Seldes one of ten 'modern critics of America' in 1923, and he soon became a commentator for its magazine. In January 1923, he sailed for Europe to turn his articles on popular culture into a book. In a letter to his brother George Seldes, he stated that –

The purpose of this voyage is a four months trip of rest, frivolity, and impressions to be followed… for solitude to be spent in writing a couple of books.

In the final months of 1923, Seldes resigned his position at The Dial to pursue freelance writing. The Seven Lively Arts, his most famous book, is the result of Seldes' sojourn in Paris.

He returned to New York the following year to write for several journals and newspapers, of which his weekly column for the Saturday Evening Post provided the most significant remuneration. Over the late 1920s and 1930s, he also dabbled in writing and producing plays and musicals, besides writing columns. Some, like A Midsummer Night's Dream (1936), performed badly in the box office, and others, like Love of Three Oranges (1925), were not even staged. His one Broadway success was his adaptation of the Greek play Lysistrata by Aristophanes (1932).

=== Television and higher education ===
Seldes' interests evolved along with the expansion of film, radio and television. From 1927, he was a film critic for The New Republic, and investigated the working class' especial partiality to film. He joined CBS in 1937 as its first director of television programs, and in 1952, served as the director of the National Association for Better Radio and TV, a nonprofit corporation. He wrote, produced and directed mostly educational programs for the small screen and for radio, covering topics on American history and culture. These include Americans at Work and Puritan in Babylon (1937) for the radio and This is America (1933), a seventy-minute documentary that was shown in picture houses across the U.S. It was the first full-length documentary film ever made. He also hosted NBC's The Subject is Jazz (1958), a weekly series that introduced genres of jazz to the American public. From the 1950s, he was an adjunct lecturer for literature and communications at Columbia University.

Seldes was the founding dean of the Annenberg School of Communications at the University of Pennsylvania, Philadelphia (1959–1963). He was the program consultant for National Educational Television from 1963 and was also elected to the American Academy of Arts and Letters in that year.

Throughout his career, Seldes struggled between the pragmatic journalistic need to write profitably and his desire to write material of enduring value. In the years following the Great Depression, for example, he experienced financial difficulties and had little choice but to write for purely commercial projects. These include This Is New York (1934), a tourist guide to the city.

== The Seven Lively Arts ==
The Seven Lively Arts is Seldes' most significant accomplishment. In explaining its title, he asserted that he was not referring to seven arts in particular –

One thing should, perhaps, be made clear about the phrase. There were those who thought (correctly) that you couldn't find seven and there were those who felt (stuffily) that the seven were not arts. Lively was for the most part unchallenged. The sacred 7 came from the classics, from 'the seven arts' (which was also the name of a magazine recently defunct) and I never tried to categorise the contents of the book to conform to the figure.

He would reiterate all his life that his intention was to treat popular (and denigrated) culture with the intelligent criticism that contemporary critics were largely inclined only to apply to highbrow culture; in 1922, his initial list of oft-ignored genres were "Slapstick Moving Pictures, Comic Strips, Revues, Musical Comedy, Columns, Slang Humor, Popular Songs, Vaudeville". Following Seldes' completion of The Seven Lively Arts in 1923, he wrote that the central message of the book was

that the minor arts, those frequently called "lowbrow", are not hostile to the major arts, and that both the minor and the major have their chief enemy in the second rate bogus arts.

This "bogus" Seldes defines as the pseudo-intellectual art that pretends to be high: "vocal concerts, pseudo-classic dancing, the serious intellectual drama, the civic masque, the high-toned moving picture, and grand opera", inherently defined by snobbery.

Seldes also sought to explain why African-American music and shows were so popular, and to revise conventional definitions of art. Still, as much as he praised the vitality and honesty of these shows, he also stated that they were savage in nature, and mistakenly predicted that they would be short-lived.

== Professional relationships ==
Seldes was always a "non-joiner", refusing to join H. L. Mencken's "smart set" or the Algonquin Round Table.

Seldes was a champion of Krazy Kat cartoonist George Herriman, and the two maintained a friendly relationship. Herriman referenced Seldes' work in his strips, and Seldes commissioned Herriman to draw his family's Christmas cards in 1922.

He had a strained relationship with Ernest Hemingway, who despised him despite his frequent praise for Hemingway's work. A similarly tense professional relationship developed between Seldes and Edward Murrow, as a result of their disagreement over Murrow's portrayal of Senator Joseph McCarthy on Murrow's show, See It Now (March 9, 1954). Seldes consistently advocated fair and responsible reporting, and criticized Murrow's intention to disprove McCarthy's credibility.

Seldes also regularly panned F. Scott Fitzgerald's work, save for his most famous novel, The Great Gatsby, which he praised in the August 1925 issue of The Dial. Even so, Seldes and Fitzgerald remained good friends throughout their careers.

== Death and legacy ==
In his later years, Seldes suffered from ill health, poor memory, and emotional distress, which prevented him from completing his memoirs. He relied on his Skye terrier, Bobby, and his daughter, Marian, for companionship. As he was writing his memoirs, As in My Time (1958), he became interested in the impact of scientific progress on social institutions and communications. He died at age 77 of heart failure in his apartment on September 29, 1970.

Seldes' legacy was immeasurable. As author, critic, editor, producer, director and educator, his impact was farther reaching than mere periodical circulation or television time-slot. Leo Mishkin, a critic for New York's The Morning Telegraph, described Seldes' impact:

He was my teacher as he was also for thousands of other just coming of age back in the mid-1920s. Not in the sense of standing up in front of a classroom and lecturing, or correcting examinations…But outside of school one of the requirements we all had was to read The Dial ... and when The Seven Lively Arts was published in 1924 we knew instinctively that a new age, a new appreciation of the arts, indeed a new horizon had opened up for us all...(His enthusiasms) will endure as long as the mass of American look for relaxation and rewards in the mass entertainment media. It was Gilbert Seldes who set the whole nation on that road. His name remains a monument to his influence.

== Works ==
=== Books ===
- The United States and the War (1917)
- The Seven Lively Arts (1924)

Name given to The Seven Lively Arts program.

- The Square Emerald (1928)

Published under the pseudonym Foster Johns.

- The Stammering Century (1928)
- The Victory Murders (1928)

Published under the pseudonym Foster Johns.

- An Hour with the Movies and the Talkies (1929)
- The Movies and the Talkies (1929)
- The Wings of the Eagle (1929)
- Back from Utopia (1929)
- The Future of Drinking (1930)
- Against Revolution (1932)
- The Years of the Locust (1933)
- Mainland (1936)
- Movies for the Millions (1937)
- The Movies Come from America (1937)
- Your Money and Your Life (1938)
- Proclaim Liberty! (1942)
- The Portable Ring Lardner (1946)
- The Great Audience (1950)
- Writing for Television (1952)
- The Public Arts (1956)
- The Seven Lively Arts, 2nd ed. (1957)
- The New Mass Media (1957)
- As in My Time (1958)

Incomplete and unpublished memoirs.

=== Plays and musicals ===
- The Wisecrackers (1925)
- Love of Three Oranges (1925)
- Lysistrata (A Modern Version) (1932)
- A Midsummer Night's Dream (1936)
- Swinging the Dream (1939)

=== Radio and television ===
- This is America (1933)
- Americans at Work (1937)
- The Taming of the Shrew (1937)
- Puritan in Babylon (1937)
- Living History (1938)
- Americans All – Immigrants All (1938)
- The Lively Arts (1950s)
- The Subject is Jazz (1958)
