= George Seldes =

American investigative journalist and media critic

- George Seldes (1989), age 98
- Born: Henry George Seldes; November 16, 1890; Alliance Colony, New Jersey, U.S. (now Pittsgrove Township, New Jersey)
- Died: July 2, 1995 (aged 104); Windsor, Vermont, U.S.
- Occupation: Journalist
- Spouse: Helen Larkin Wiesman (m. 1932; died 1979)
- Parents: Anna Saphro (mother); George Sergius Seldes (father)
- Relatives: Gilbert Seldes (brother); Marian Seldes (niece); Timothy Seldes (nephew)
- Writing career
- Language: English
- Notable works: In Fact newsletter and a series of books
- Website: georgeseldes.net at the Wayback Machine (archived November 20, 2018)

Henry George Seldes (/ˈsɛldəs/ SEL-dəs;^{[aa]} November 16, 1890 – July 2, 1995) was an American investigative journalist, foreign correspondent, editor, author, and media critic best known for the publication of the newsletter In Fact from 1940 to 1950. He was an investigative reporter of the kind known in early 20th century as a muckraker, using his journalism to fight injustice and justify reform.

Influenced by Lincoln Steffens and Walter Lippmann, Seldes's career began when he was hired at the Pittsburgh Leader at the age of 19. In 1914, he was appointed night editor of the Pittsburgh Post. In 1916, he went to the United Press in London. In 1917, during World War I, he moved to France to work at the Marshall Syndicate, where he was a member of the press corps of the American Expeditionary Force. After the War, Seldes spent ten years as a reporter for the Chicago Tribune. In 1922, he interviewed Vladimir Lenin. He was twice expelled from countries he was reporting from: in 1923 from the Soviet Union, along with three colleagues, for disguising news reports as personal letters, and in 1925 from Italy, for implicating Benito Mussolini in opposition leader Giacomo Matteotti's murder. He would leave the Tribune when he battled with its owner and publisher, Robert R. McCormick, over the paper altering his 1927 articles on Mexico criticizing the use of their mineral rights by American companies, which he considered to be censorship.

In 1929, Seldes became a freelance reporter and author, subsequently writing a series of books and criticism about his years as a foreign correspondent, and the issues of censorship, suppression and distortion in the press. During the late 1930s he had one more stint as a foreign correspondent, on a freelance basis, in Spain during the Spanish Civil War. In 1938, Seldes was hired to edit the anti-fascist Ken magazine, but his role was quickly downgraded due to advertiser concerns about his leftist views. In 1940, Seldes co-founded a weekly newsletter, In Fact, where he attacked corporate malfeasance, often using government documents from the Federal Trade Commission (FTC) and the Federal Communications Commission (FCC). He exposed the health hazards of cigarettes and attacked the mainstream press for suppressing them, blaming the newspapers' heavy dependence on cigarette advertising. He cited J. Edgar Hoover and the FBI for anti-union campaigns, and brought attention to the National Association of Manufacturers' use of advertising dollars to produce news stories favorable to its members and suppress unfavorable ones.

Having both staunch admirers and strong critics, Seldes influenced some younger journalists. He received an award for professional excellence from the Association for Education in Journalism in 1980 and a George Polk Award for his life's work in 1981. Seldes also served on the board of Fairness and Accuracy in Reporting (FAIR).

== Early years ==
Henry George Seldes, named after economist Henry George, was born on November 16, 1890, to Jewish émigrés from Russia in Alliance Colony (now Pittsgrove Township), an agricultural community in rural southern New Jersey. His mother, Anna Saphro, died in 1896 when he and his younger brother, Gilbert, were still young. George's father, George Sergius Seldes, was a pharmacist and a strongly opinionated and radically philosophical man who was a libertarian and corresponded with Leo Tolstoy and Peter Kropotkin, being interested in the latter's ideas on mutual aid. He influenced every aspect of his sons' lives, pushing them to "read books that you will reread—and that you will never outgrow," and refusing to force religion upon children who were "too young to understand it," instilling a free-thinking attitude in his sons.

When he was 19, Seldes went to work at the Pittsburgh Leader. An early scoop of his for this paper was when three-time presidential candidate William Jennings Bryan expelled Seldes from Bryan's hotel room. He also interviewed a saleswoman who had filed a rape complaint against the son of the owner of a large department store, but the story was not published, and Seldes became outraged when the advertising department of the newspaper blackmailed the owner into buying more advertising. In 1914, he was appointed night editor of the Pittsburgh Post. As a young journalist, he was influenced by the investigative journalism of muckraker Lincoln Steffens, whom he met in 1919; he was also influenced by Walter Lippman. Just before World War I, he'd study for a year at Harvard University, at the instigation of his brother Gilbert.

== World War I ==
In 1916, Seldes moved to London where he worked for the United Press. When the United States joined the First World War in 1917, Seldes was sent to France where he worked, first briefly as the managing editor of the Army edition of the Chicago Tribune, based in Paris, then as the war correspondent for the Marshall Syndicate. He became a member of the press corps of the American Expeditionary Forces in France, section G-2D, and as such was commissioned as an officer, as were all journalists in that group.

At the end of the war, he obtained an exclusive interview with Paul von Hindenburg, the supreme commander of the German Army, in which Hindenburg supposedly acknowledged the role America had played in defeating Germany. "The American infantry," said Hindenburg, according to Seldes, "won the World War in battle in the Argonne." Seldes and the others were accused of breaking the Armistice and were court martialed. They were also forbidden to write anything about the interview and it never appeared in American news media. Seldes believed that blocking publication of this interview proved tragic. Unaware of Hindenburg's direct testimony of Germany's military defeat, Germans adopted the Dolchstoss or stab-in-the-back myth that Germany had only lost the war because it was betrayed at home by "the socialists, the Communists and the Jews," which served as Nazism's explanation for Germany's defeat. "If the Hindenburg interview had been passed by Pershing's censors at the time, it would have been headlined in every country civilized enough to have newspapers and undoubtedly would have made an impression on millions of people and became an important page in history," wrote Seldes. "I believe it would have destroyed the main planks on which Hitler rose to power, it would have prevented World War II, the greatest and worst war in all history, and it would have changed the future of all mankind."

However, it was Hindenburg himself, who in a hearing before a committee of the German National Assembly investigating the causes of the World War and Germany's defeat, on November 18, 1919, a year after the war's end, declared, "As an English general has very truly said, the German Army was 'stabbed in the back'," grossly misrepresenting General Frederick Maurice's book, The Last Four Months. It was particularly this testimony of Hindenburg that led to the widespread Dolchstoßlegende in post-World War I Germany.

Seldes claimed that the Battle of Saint-Mihiel never happened. In his account, General Pershing planned to capture the city, but on September 1 the Germans decided to remove their forces from Saint-Mihiel to reinforce other positions. Seldes claimed no shots were fired as the first Americans, he among them, entered the city on September 13 to be greeted as liberators before General Pershing, Pétain, and other high-ranking officers arrived. The thousands of German prisoners captured, he wrote, were taken as they mistakenly arrived at the train station days later to relieve the German troops that had left days earlier.

== Lenin and Mussolini ==
Picture of a young George Seldes for a Chicago Tribune filecard. Notice the Chicago Tribune stamp

Seldes spent the next ten years as an international reporter for the Chicago Tribune. At the instigation of war correspondent Floyd Gibbons, he dropped the name "Henry", and started covering international affairs, despite originally being relunctant to do so. He interviewed Lenin in 1922. He and three other reporters were expelled in 1923 when Soviet authorities, who routinely censored foreign reporters' telegraphed dispatches, found articles by the four reporters, disguised as personal letters, being smuggled out in a diplomatic mailpouch to avoid censorship. The expulsion was facilitated, according to Seldes, after his publisher and owner, "Colonel" Robert R. McCormick, failed to show sufficient respect when writing to the Soviets to protest censorship.

In 1925, the Chicago Tribune sent him to Italy where he wrote about Benito Mussolini and the rise of fascism. (Mussolini had served as Seldes's stringer before the former took power.) He investigated the murder of Giacomo Matteotti, the head of the parliamentary section of the Italian Unitary Socialist Party. His article implicated Mussolini in the killing, and Seldes was expelled from Italy. He wrote an account of Italian censorship and intimidation of American reporters for Harper's Magazine.

In 1927, the Chicago Tribune sent Seldes to Mexico, but his articles criticizing American corporations for their use of that country's mineral rights were not well received. Seldes returned to Europe, but found that his work increasingly censored to fit the political views of the newspaper's owner, McCormick.

== Freelance ==
Disillusioned, Seldes left the Tribune and went to work as a freelance writer. In his first two books, You Can't Print That! (1929) and Can These Things Be! (1931), Seldes included material that he had not been allowed to publish in the Tribune. His next book, World Panorama (1933), was a narrative history of the interbellum period. In 1932 he married Helen Larkin Wiesman (later Seldes), who died in the late 1970s.

In 1934, Seldes published a history of the Roman Catholic Church, The Vatican. This was followed by an exposé of the global arms industry, Iron, Blood and Profits (1934) and an account of Benito Mussolini, Sawdust Caesar (1935).

Two books on the newspaper business established his enduring reputation as a critic of the press: Freedom of the Press (1935) and Lords of the Press (1938). He took the title of the latter from a speech by Secretary of the Interior Harold Ickes: "Our ancestors did not fight for the right of a few Lords of the Press to have almost exclusive control of and censorship over the dissemination of news and ideas." He believed "that advertisers were a far greater threat to journalistic freedom than government censorship." The press and news, he wrote, "are coming more and more under the domination of a handful of corporate publishers who may print such news as they wish to print and omit such news as they do not wish to print." Time was initially positive in its response: "A rambling but effective attack on U. S. newspapers, charging coloring, distortion or suppression of vital news, containing some enlightening instances of journalistic malpractices as George Seldes encountered them during his career as correspondent." Later, Time called him a muckraker, meaning a biased and crusading critic, when it called another writer's work "refreshingly fair and accurate (especially in comparison with muckraking books like George Seldes' Lords of the Press)." Seldes told of his pursuit of a tobacco study that he would make public years later, though the author of the study denied his account and claimed his work had been widely cited in the press.

With his wife Helen, he also reported on the Spanish Civil War on a freelance basis for three years and later said that American reporters too readily accepted what the Franco side wanted them to believe. His disgust at the American press for their Civil War coverage motivated him to start his own newsletter, In Fact. The Seldeses saw the Civil War as a "dress rehearsal" for what came to be World War II.

On August 4, 1939, Seldes, along with 400 other writers and intellectuals, signed a letter condemning anti-Soviet attitudes in the United States, called for better relations between the two countries, described the Soviet Union as a supporter of world peace, and said, "The Soviet Union considers political dictatorship a transitional form and has shown a steadily expanding democracy". The letter was published in September 1939, shortly after the Molotov–Ribbentrop Pact had become known in the United States, and later in September, same month that the Soviet invasion of Poland began.

On his return to the United States in 1940, Seldes published Witch Hunt, an account of the persecution of people with left-wing political views in America, and The Catholic Crisis, which sought to demonstrate the close relationship between the Catholic Church and fascist organizations in Europe. When Time reviewed the latter, it noted several of Seldes' works and said he "stuck out his tongue at Benito Mussolini ... thumbed his nose at U. S. journalism ... and uttered some hoarse Bronx cheers at the Roman Catholic Church." The review complained that his detailed accounts of church activities were "in part damaging" but "not all germane to the subject."

== In Fact ==
Cover of volume IX, issue 22, of In Fact, An Antidote for Falsehood in the Daily Press

From 1940 to 1950, Seldes published a political newsletter, In Fact which originally had the full name In Fact: For the millions who want a free press and later In Fact: An Antidote for Falsehood in the Daily Press, "a four-page weekly compendium of news other newspapers wouldn't print." Washington Post editor and later press critic Ben Bagdikian and former New York Post reporter Victor Weingarten said, "When Seldes was no longer printed by the mainstream press, he was an important conduit to the journalistic community, who knew that there were flaws in the system, but often couldn't get printed in their own newspapers, because the press cannot be a watchdog on itself. So they fed stories critical of the press to Seldes." Seldes himself said that more than 200 newspapermen gave him stories every week. However, the most commonly used sources were government documents from the Congressional Report, the Federal Trade Commission (FTC), the Federal Communications Commission (FCC) and other specialized public resources, which were seldom relied upon by the mainstream media. At the height of its popularity it had a circulation of 176,000.

One of the first articles published in the newsletter concerned the dangers of cigarette smoking. Seldes later explained that at the time, "The tobacco stories were suppressed by every major newspaper. For ten years we pounded on tobacco as being one of the only legal poisons you could buy in America." At a time when tobacco companies were major advertisers, Seldes discussed the contents of a study, "Tobacco Smoking and Longevity," which he said had been suppressed since 1939. Throughout the 10-year run of In Fact, Seldes published more than 50 stories on the health effects of tobacco and the cigarette industry's attempts at suppressing such news.

Among the favorite targets of In Fact was the National Association of Manufacturers. Defense analyst Daniel Ellsberg, who subscribed to In Fact while an undergraduate at Harvard, said, "I heard about the National Association of Manufacturers first from Seldes and more from Seldes than I ever heard again. If you were to read the press itself, you'd hardly become aware that such organizations existed, that businessmen worked together to pursue their own interests." In Fact also attacked Charles Lindbergh for his Nazi sympathies, the American Legion for helping to break strikes, and labeled many captains of industry as "native fascists." Consumer advocate Ralph Nader said, "[Seldes] used the word fascism to reflect an authoritarian state of mind that tended to stifle free speech and dissent and also tended to believe that might was right."

In Fact immediately attracted the attention of government authorities. President Franklin D. Roosevelt ordered an FBI investigation of Seldes and In Fact in 1940. Articles claiming that the FBI was infiltrating unions and monitoring union activities resulted in FBI surveillance of Seldes and his publication. J. Edgar Hoover sent Seldes a 15-page letter denying such FBI activities. The FBI subsequently questioned In Fact subscribers, particularly servicemen and women, and had U.S. postal officials reporting to the FBI on Seldes' mail correspondence. In Fact lost many of its subscribers in the late 1940s. Seldes later claimed that his critical coverage of Yugoslavia got the publication banned from Communist Party bookstores. The political climate discouraged subscriptions on the part of less ideologically committed readers as well. In Fact ceased publication in 1950. I. F. Stone's Weekly, which started publication in 1953, took In Fact as its model.

In addition to writing his newsletter, Seldes continued to publish books. They included Facts and Fascism (1943) and One Thousand Americans (1947), an account of the people who controlled America. Time called One Thousand Americans "a collection of truths, half-truths and untruths about the U.S. press and industry." One Thousand Americans introduced a wide audience to the Business Plot, a supposed plan of America's corporate elite to overthrow the U.S. government in the early 1930s.

Seldes published The People Don't Know on the origins of the Cold War in 1949.

== Politics and later career ==
According to KGB documents, Seldes was a longtime secret member of the U.S. Communist Party since well before 1940 who was valued for his "major connections" in Washington.

Seldes later wrote that In Fact was founded at the instigation of the U.S. Communist Party leadership, but he wrote that the party worked through his partner Bruce Minton (also known as Richard Bransten) without his knowledge. Seldes wrote that he was unaware that Minton was a party member who received the funds to start In Fact from the Communist Party.^{[ab]} While his political positions often were similar to those in the Party in 1940, by 1948 Seldes was writing in positive terms of the anti-Soviet communism of Marshal Tito in Yugoslavia, which earned him the wrath of many Communist Party loyalists in the United States. As the Cold War took shape at the end of the decade, Seldes lost readership from both the Communists and the anti-liberal-left sentiment that was sweeping the country, including a trade union movement that had contained some of his largest audience. The nationwide atmosphere of McCarthyism and red-baiting further diminished his subscribers' numbers, and he was financially forced to close In Fact, which never accepted advertising, in October 1950.

Senator Joseph McCarthy subpoenaed Seldes in 1953. Seldes vehemently denied Communist Party membership and was "cleared" by McCarthy's Senate subcommittee, but Seldes's greatest influence on readers had already passed. Seldes did publish Tell the Truth and Run in 1953, but otherwise found it difficult to publish his work throughout the 1950s. He was approached, however, by an old friend and colleague, I.F. Stone, for advice on how to start a small independent investigative newspaper. I.F. Stone's Weekly premiered in 1953, picking up where Seldes had left off.

Largely dropping his own writing, he developed an anthology called The Great Quotations and received rejections from 20 publishers. It sold more than a million copies when it appeared in 1961.

In a letter to Time magazine in 1974, he appraised the state of American journalism as much improved in his lifetime:

The press deserved the attacks and criticisms of Will Irwin (1910) and Upton Sinclair (1920) and the muckrakers who followed, and it needs today the watchdog and gadfly activities of the new critical weeklies, but all in all it is now a better medium of mass information ... The 1972 Watergate disclosures, it is true, were made by only a score of the members of the mass media, but I remember Teapot Dome when only one of our 1,750 dailies (the Albuquerque Morning Journal) dared to tell the truth about White House corruption. We have come a long way since.

He published Never Tire of Protesting in 1968 and Even the Gods Can't Change History in 1976.

The Association for Education in Journalism gave him an award for professional excellence in 1980. In 1981 he received the George Polk Award for his life's work.

He published his autobiography, Witness to a Century, in 1987. He wrote, "And so [my brother] Gilbert and I, brought up without a formal religion, remained throughout our lifetimes just what Father was, freethinkers. And, likewise, doubters and dissenters and perhaps Utopians. Father's rule had been 'Question everything, take nothing for granted,' and I never outlived it, and I would suggest it be made the motto of a world journalists' association."

In 1981, Seldes appeared in Warren Beatty's Reds, a film about the life of journalist John Reed. Seldes appears as one of the film's "witnesses" commenting on the historical events depicted in the film.

Seldes served on the board of Fairness and Accuracy in Reporting (FAIR).

Martin A. Lee and Norman Solomon used a quote from Seldes as an epigraph for their book Unreliable Sources: "The most sacred cow of the press is the press itself."

== Death and legacy ==
According to journalist Randolph T. Holhut, when he met Seldes in 1992, the latter had suffered a stroke "a couple of years earlier", which had "slowed him somewhat", had good memory of the past but not the present, required round-the-clock care and was unable to walk alone, "tired easily and [...] spent much of each day sleeping", and still could see but not hear.

Seldes died on July 2, 1995, in Windsor, Vermont, at 104. A delegation of journalists attended the memorial service at his home in Hartland Four Corners, Vermont, read from his books and watched an excerpt from Tell the Truth and Run: George Seldes and the American Press, a documentary in progress.

The documentary was produced and directed by Rick Goldsmith and premiered the following year, in 1996. It covered Seldes's life and career, and revived the life and work of a man who for four decades had been largely forgotten. The film looked at Seldes's life and work, especially the theme of censorship and suppression in America's news media. It was nominated for an Academy Award for Best Documentary Feature, and received many other accolades, including the John O'Connor Film Award from the American Historical Association.

== Critical reception ==
Seldes had both staunch admirers and strong critics. Some of his contemporaries and later historians have judged much of his work harshly. One critic thought I. F. Stone "was light years beyond Seldes." Others cited his political bias and preconceptions. A study of the Dies Committee said that Seldes's account in Witch Hunt suffered from his view that everything the Committee did was wrong. Another warned that The Catholic Crisis "should be read with great caution in view of the author's latent anti-Catholic and pro-Communist bias." Another cited Seldes as a writer with "an agenda." Still another evaluated Iron, Blood, and Profits as "less sober" than other works on the subject of international arms dealing. Of his biography of Mussolini, another wrote: "many of his sources were unreliable and his book was almost devoid of logical order." A more appreciative assessment said Freedom of the Press was "one-sided, but well deserves careful reading." Summing up Seldes's work, another wrote that "until 1947 [Seldes] followed the Stalinist line so closely that any author must use him with the utmost care."

A. J. Liebling said on him, "[George Seldes is] about as subtle as a house falling in. He makes too much of the failure of newspapers to print exactly what George Seldes would have printed if he were the managing editor. But he is a useful citizen. 'In Fact' is a fine little gadfly, representing an enormous effort for one man and his wife".

According to historian Helen Fordham, Seldes's career demonstrates that those who crusade too vehemently may violate standards of impartiality and objectivity. As a result, their work may and be labelled as radical and subversive.

But a whole generation of journalists and activists were influenced greatly by Seldes. Long-time Washington Post columnist Colman McCarthy said, "[...] I'm always amused when they call somebody 'one-sided'. Seldes offered one side – the side you weren't getting elsewhere. [...] He was a reporter who didn't worry about being objective. He worried about what he would choose to write". Nader said of Seldes, "He was like a doctor. He reported about disease in the political economy, and the gross inequities of power, and the abuses and the exploitation. [...] I always wanted to be a crusading lawyer, and he gave me some materials to contemplate crusading about." Journalist Nat Hentoff said, "He took what should be the most honorable term in journalism – muckraking – and made it work again. [...] A lot of journalists of his generation and the generation or two that followed, did more, took risks, because [Seldes] was the model. And the fact that he was there made them feel like whores if they didn't do more."

Randolph T. Holhut considered Seldes, alongside Lincoln Steffens and I. F. Stone, one of "three great independent journalists" of the 20th century, as well as "the living link between Steffens and Stone", lamenting that his career has been "overlooked" in comparison to the latter two, and stating that "the story of George Seldes is the story of the Twentieth Century".

People such as Peggy Charren and I. F. Stone also claimed influence from Seldes.

== Family ==
The writer and critic Gilbert Seldes was George Seldes's younger brother. Actress Marian Seldes was his niece; his nephew was the literary agent Timothy Seldes.

He was married to Helen Larkin Seldes, née Wiesman, from 1932 to her death in 1979, at the age of 74, in Spain, while they were tourists there, of a rare blood condition. Helen was 15 years younger than George. His niece Marian stated, in the documentary Tell the Truth and Run, that he waited for his wife. According to George himself, they first met at a party in Paris, where she told him she wanted to go to Moscow to work in biochemistry, but he tried to dissuade her by giving her an account of how people lived badly in Russia, only for her to respond that she never wanted to see him again. They met a second time at another party, where she told him that his and other accounts dissuaded her from moving to Moscow; he invited her to dinner at a restaurant, then took her to his home, and from then they started living together, marrying after a while.

== Works ==
- Seldes, George (1929). You Can't Print That!: The Truth Behind the News, 1918–1928. New York: Payson & Clarke Ltd. LCCN 30017808.
- Seldes, George (1931). Can These Things Be!. New York: Brewer, Warren & Putnam. LCCN 31011503.
- Seldes, George (1933). World Panorama: 1918–1933. Boston: Little, Brown and Company. LCCN 33015881.
- Seldes, George (1934). The Vatican: Yesterday – Today – Tomorrow. London: Kegan Paul, Trench, Trubner & Co., Ltd. LCCN 34004556.
- Seldes, George (1934). Iron, Blood, and Profits: An Exposure of the World-wide Munitions Racket. New York: Harper & Brothers. LCCN 34010357.
- Seldes, George (1935). Sawdust Caesar: The Untold History of Mussolini and Fascism. New York and London: Harper & Brothers. LCCN 35028735.
- Seldes, George (1935). The Fascist Road to Ruin: Why Italy Plans the Rape of Ethiopia. New York: American League Against War and Fascism. LCCN 42052200.
- Seldes, George (1935). Freedom of the Press. Indianapolis and New York: The Bobbs-Merrill Company. LCCN 35015779.
- Seldes, George (1935). World Panorama: 1918–1935. New York: Blue Ribbon Books. LCCN 35010441.
- Seldes, George (1938). Lords of the Press. New York: J. Messner, Inc. LCCN unk82060611.
- Seldes, George (1938). You Can't Do That: A Survey of the Forces Attempting, in the Name of Patriotism, to Make a Desert of the Bill of Rights. New York: Modern Age Books. LCCN 38009415.
- Seldes, George (1945) [1939]. The Catholic Crisis. New York: J. Messner Inc. LCCN 47001890.
- Seldes, George (1940). Witch Hunt: The Technique and Profits of Redbaiting. New York: Modern Age Books. LCCN 40027853.
- Seldes, George (1942). The Facts Are...: A Guide to Falsehood and Propaganda in the Press and Radio. New York: In Fact, Inc. LCCN unk82015988.
- Seldes, George; Seldes, Helen (1943). Facts and Fascism. New York: In Fact, Inc. LCCN 43015884.
- Seldes, George (1947). One Thousand Americans: The Real Rulers of the U.S.A. New York: Boni & Gaer. LCCN 48000432.
- Seldes, George (1949). The People Don't Know: The American Press and the Cold War. New York: Gaer Associates. LCCN 49011609.
- Seldes, George (1953). Tell the Truth and Run. New York: Greenberg. LCCN 53010452.
- Seldes, George (1967) [1960]. The Great Quotations. New York: L. Stuart (original) and Pocket Books (1967 ed.). ISBN 9780671804992. LCCN 92039506.
- Seldes, George (1968). Never Tire of Protesting: The Story of In Fact and Other Revelations. New York: L. Stuart. ISBN 9780818400605. LCCN 68-18758.
- Seldes, George (1976). Even the Gods Can't Change History: The Facts Speak for Themselves. Secaucus: L. Stuart. ISBN 9780818402333. LCCN 76017807.
- Seldes, George (1985). The Great Thoughts: From Abelard to Zola, from Ancient Greece to Contemporary America, the Ideas that have Shaped the History of the World. New York: Ballantine Books. ISBN 0-345-29887-X. LCCN 84-45673.
- Seldes, George (1987). Witness to a Century: The Noted, the Notorious, and Three S.O.B.s. New York: Ballantine Books. ISBN 0-345-33181-8. LCCN 86-47804.
- Seldes, George (1996). Laskin, David (ed.). The Great Thoughts, Revised and Updated!: From Abelard to Zola, from Ancient Greece to Contemporary America, the Ideas that have Shaped the History of the World. New York: Ballantine Books. ISBN 0-345-40428-9. LCCN 96-096051.

== Footnotes ==
aa. Asked how to say his name, he told the Literary Digest in 1936: "Nine persons out of ten mispronounce our name. If it had an n instead of an s as the final letter there would be no difficulty. The name is pronounced like Selden with the last letter an s": SEL-dəs.
ab. According to Minton the Party wanted an American version of Claud Cockburn's muckraking London political weekly, The Week.

== Further reading and viewing ==
- Fordham, Helen (November 17, 2016). "Subversive Voices: George Seldes and Mid-Twentieth-Century Muckraking". American Journalism. 33 (4): 424–441. doi:10.1080/08821127.2016.1241643. S2CID 157930214.
- Goldsmith, Rick (1996). Tell the Truth and Run: George Seldes and the American Press. Kovno Communications. ISBN 9781574481440.
- Holhut, Randolph T. (1994). The George Seldes Reader: An Anthology of the Writings of America's Foremost Journalistic Gadfly. New York: Barricade Books. ISBN 1-56980-007-3. LCCN 93-48816.
