= Martin Grams Jr. =

American journalist (born 1977)

- Born: April 19, 1977 (age 49); United States
- Occupations: Writer, author, pop culture historian
- Writing career
- Language: English
- Genres: Popular culture, film, television

Martin Grams Jr. (born April 19, 1977) is an American popular culture historian who wrote and co-wrote over thirty books about network broadcasting and motion-pictures. Born in Baltimore, Maryland, Grams is the son of a magician, Martin Grams Sr. and Mary Patricia Grams, a librarian. Grams is also the author of more than 100 magazine articles.

Grams is the recipient of the 1999 Ray Stanich Award, the 2005 Stone/Waterman Award, and the 2004 Parley Baer Award for his contribution to preserving the arts. In February 2022, he received the Stan Cawelti award from the Metro Washington OTR Club.

In an interview for USA Today in April 2011, Grams stood his ground on a controversial subject regarding research in a digital age. In November 2010, Grams publicly stated: "I know of no serious researcher or scholar who uses the internet as reference for their studies. They should use the internet as a 'tool' for research... Myths begin when mistakes in prior publications carry over into new publications. Reprinted many times, a myth becomes the gospel... proving that fifteen books can be wrong and 100 websites are definitely wrong."

Many of his books include forewords by celebrities including Patricia Hitchcock, daughter of Alfred Hitchcock, contributing to his The Alfred Hitchcock Presents Companion; Joe Dante for Way Out: A History and Episode Guide to Roald Dahl's Spooky 1961 Television Program; George Clayton Johnson for his award-winning The Twilight Zone: Unlocking the Door to a Television Classic; and Bob Barker for Truth or Consequences, The Quiz Show That was a National Phenomenon.

Martin Grams provided audio commentary for The Twilight Zone Blu-ray release. He wrote and narrated a video documentary for the Inner Sanctum Mystery Blu-ray Release. He also wrote the liner notes for over fifty DVD and Blu-ray releases including the VCI entertainment release of The Green Hornet (1940) and The Green Hornet Strikes Again (1941), reviewed as "wonderfully detailed liner notes by writers Martin Grams Jr., and Terry Salomonson".

Martin served as the editor of Radio Recall, a bi-monthly newsletter for the Metro Washington OTR Club, from 2017 to April 2021.

Martin was nominated twice for the Rondo award, winning the 2008 award for 'Best Book of the Year' for The Twilight Zone: Unlocking the Door to a Television Classic.

Martin and his wife are volunteers for the annual non-profit film festival known as the Mid-Atlantic Nostalgia Convention. Martin also volunteers for the WIlliamsburg Film Festival, which began in 1997.

== Works ==
- Suspense: Twenty Years of Thrills and Chills Morris Publishing, 1998 ISBN 1-57502-675-9
- The History of the Cavalcade of America Morris Publishing, 1999. ISBN 0-7392-0138-7
- The CBS Radio Mystery Theater: An Episode Guide and Handbook to Nine Years of Broadcasting, 1974–1982 McFarland Publishing, 1999. ISBN 978-0786418909
- The Alfred Hitchcock Story Britain Unk, 1999. ISBN 978-0878331635
- Radio Drama: American Programs, 1932–1962 McFarland Publishing, 2000. ISBN 978-0786400515
- The Have Gun – Will Travel Companion OTR Publishing, 2000. ISBN 0-9703310-0-2
- The Alfred Hitchcock Presents Companion OTR Publishing, 2001. ISBN 0-9703310-1-0
- Invitation to Learning OTR Publishing, 2002. ISBN 0-9703310-4-5
- It's That Time Again BearManor Media, 2002. ISBN 978-0971457027
- The Sound of Detection: Ellery Queen's Adventures in Radio OTR Publishing, 2002. ISBN 0-9703310-2-9
- It's That Time Again 2 BearManor Media, 2003. ISBN 978-1593930066
- The I Love A Mystery Companion OTR Publishing, 2003. ISBN 0-9703310-5-3
- Inner Sanctum Mysteries: Behind the Creaking Door OTR Publishing, 2002. ISBN 0-9703310-3-7
- Information Please BearManor Media, 2003. ISBN 0-9714570-7-7
- Gang Busters: The Crime Fighters of American Broadcasting OTR Publishing, 2005. ISBN 0-9703310-6-1
- The Railroad Hour: A History of the Radio Series BearManor Media, 2007. ISBN 978-1593930646
- I Led Three Lives: The Television Series BearManor Media, 2007. ISBN 1-59393-092-5
- The Radio Adventures of Sam Spade OTR Publishing, 2007. ISBN 978-0-9703310-7-6
- The Alfred Hitchcock Story Titan Books, 2008. ISBN 978-1845767082
- The Twilight Zone: Unlocking the Door to a Television Classic OTR Publishing, 2008. ISBN 978-0-9703310-9-0
- The Green Hornet: A History of Radio, Motion Pictures, Comic Books and Television OTR Publishing, 2010. ISBN 978-0-9825311-0-5
- Car 54, Where Are You? Bear Manor Media, 2010. ISBN 978-1593933401
- The Shadow: The History and Mystery of the Radio Program, 1930–1954 OTR Publishing, 2011. ISBN 978-0-9825311-1-2
- Science Fiction Theatre: A History of the Television Program, 1955–1957 Bear Manor Media, 2011. ISBN 978-1593936570
- The Best of Blood n' Thunder: Selections From the Award-Winning Journal Murania Press, 2011. ISBN 978-0979595516
- The Green Lama: The Complete Pulp Adventures Altus Press, 2012. ISBN 978-1618270214
- The Time Tunnel: A History of the Television Program Bear Manor Media, 2012. ISBN 978-1593932862
- Duffy's Tavern: A History of Ed Garner's Radio Program Bear Manor Media, 2014. ISBN 978-1593935573
- The Big Show: The Obscure Career of Tallulah Bankhead LR Publishing, 2016. ISBN 978-1984309990
- The Top 100 Classic Radio Shows Portable Press, 2017. With Carl Amari. ISBN 978-1684121274
- WYXIE Wonderland: An Unauthorized 50-Year History of WXYZ Detroit Bold Venture Press, 2017. ISBN 978-1976081002
- Bass Reeves and The Lone Ranger: Debunking the Myth LR Publishing, 2017. ISBN 978-1984066725
- Way Out: A History and Episode Guide to Roald Dahl's Spooky 1961 Television Program Bear Manor Media, 2019. ISBN 978-1082086762
- Truth or Consequences: The Quiz Show That was a National Phenomenon LR Publishing, 2020. ISBN 978-1984309846
- Renfrew of the Mounted: A History of Laurie York Erskine's Canadian Mountie Franchise OTR Publishing, 2020. ISBN 979-8699041442
- The Lone Ranger: The Early Years, 1933–1937 OTR Publishing, 2021. ISBN 979-8712392469
