= List of The New York Times number-one books of 1936 =

This is a list of books that topped The New York Times best-seller list in 1936. When the list began in 1931 through 1941 it only reflected sales in the New York City area.

== Fiction ==
The following list ranks the number-one best-selling fiction books.

The two most popular books that year were Gone with the Wind, by Margaret Mitchell, which held on top of the list for 25 weeks, and The Last Puritan by George Santayana, which was on top of the list for 11 weeks.

Date	Book	Author
January 6	It Can't Happen Here	Sinclair Lewis
January 13	It Can't Happen Here	Sinclair Lewis
January 20	If I Have Four Apples	Josephine Lawrence
January 27	If I Have Four Apples	Josephine Lawrence
February 3	If I Have Four Apples	Josephine Lawrence
February 10	The Last Puritan	George Santayana
February 17	The Last Puritan	George Santayana
February 24	The Last Puritan	George Santayana
March 2	The Last Puritan	George Santayana
March 9	The Last Puritan	George Santayana
March 16	The Last Puritan	George Santayana
March 23	The Last Puritan	George Santayana
March 30	The Last Puritan	George Santayana
April 6	The Last Puritan	George Santayana
April 13	The Last Puritan	George Santayana
April 20	The Last Puritan	George Santayana
April 27	Sparkenbroke	Charles Langbridge Morgan
May 4	Sparkenbroke	Charles Langbridge Morgan
May 11	Sparkenbroke	Charles Langbridge Morgan
May 18	Sparkenbroke	Charles Langbridge Morgan
May 25	Sparkenbroke	Charles Langbridge Morgan
June 1	The Weather in the Streets	Rosamond Lehmann
June 8	The Doctor	Mary Roberts Rinehart
June 15	The Doctor	Mary Roberts Rinehart
June 22	The Doctor	Mary Roberts Rinehart
June 29	The Doctor	Mary Roberts Rinehart
July 6	Sanfelice	Vincent Sheean
July 13	Gone with the Wind	Margaret Mitchell
July 20	Gone with the Wind	Margaret Mitchell
July 27	Gone with the Wind	Margaret Mitchell
August 3	Gone with the Wind	Margaret Mitchell
August 10	Gone with the Wind	Margaret Mitchell
August 17	Gone with the Wind	Margaret Mitchell
August 24	Gone with the Wind	Margaret Mitchell
August 31	Gone with the Wind	Margaret Mitchell
September 7	Gone with the Wind	Margaret Mitchell
September 14	Gone with the Wind	Margaret Mitchell
September 21	Gone with the Wind	Margaret Mitchell
September 28	Gone with the Wind	Margaret Mitchell
October 5	Gone with the Wind	Margaret Mitchell
October 12	Gone with the Wind	Margaret Mitchell
October 19	Gone with the Wind	Margaret Mitchell
October 26	Gone with the Wind	Margaret Mitchell
November 2	Gone with the Wind	Margaret Mitchell
November 9	Gone with the Wind	Margaret Mitchell
November 16	Gone with the Wind	Margaret Mitchell
November 23	Gone with the Wind	Margaret Mitchell
November 30	Gone with the Wind	Margaret Mitchell
December 7	Gone with the Wind	Margaret Mitchell
December 14	Gone with the Wind	Margaret Mitchell
December 21	Gone with the Wind	Margaret Mitchell
December 28	Gone with the Wind	Margaret Mitchell

== Nonfiction ==
The following list ranks the number-one best-selling nonfiction books.

Date	Book	Author
January 6	North to the Orient	Anne Morrow Lindbergh
January 13	North to the Orient	Anne Morrow Lindbergh
January 20	North to the Orient	Anne Morrow Lindbergh
January 27	North to the Orient	Anne Morrow Lindbergh
February 3	North to the Orient	Anne Morrow Lindbergh
February 10	North to the Orient	Anne Morrow Lindbergh
February 17	North to the Orient	Anne Morrow Lindbergh
February 24	North to the Orient	Anne Morrow Lindbergh
March 2	North to the Orient	Anne Morrow Lindbergh
March 9	The Way of a Transgressor	Negley Farson
March 16	The Way of a Transgressor	Negley Farson
March 23	The Way of a Transgressor	Negley Farson
March 30	The Way of a Transgressor	Negley Farson
April 6	The Way of a Transgressor	Negley Farson
April 13	The Way of a Transgressor	Negley Farson
April 20	The Way of a Transgressor	Negley Farson
April 27	The Way of a Transgressor	Negley Farson
May 4	Wake Up and Live!	Dorothea Brande
May 11	Wake Up and Live!	Dorothea Brande
May 18	Wake Up and Live!	Dorothea Brande
May 25	Wake Up and Live!	Dorothea Brande
June 1	Wake Up and Live!	Dorothea Brande
June 8	Wake Up and Live!	Dorothea Brande
June 15	Wake Up and Live!	Dorothea Brande
June 22	Wake Up and Live!	Dorothea Brande
June 29	Wake Up and Live!	Dorothea Brande
July 6	Wake Up and Live!	Dorothea Brande
July 13	Wake Up and Live!	Dorothea Brande
July 20	Wake Up and Live!	Dorothea Brande
July 27	Wake Up and Live!	Dorothea Brande
August 3	Wake Up and Live!	Dorothea Brande
August 10	Wake Up and Live!	Dorothea Brande
August 17	Wake Up and Live!	Dorothea Brande
August 24	Around the World in Eleven Years	Patience, Richard and John Abbe
August 31	Around the World in Eleven Years	Patience, Richard and John Abbe
September 7	Live Alone and Like It	Marjorie Hillis
September 14	Live Alone and Like It	Marjorie Hillis
September 21	Live Alone and Like It	Marjorie Hillis
September 28	Live Alone and Like It	Marjorie Hillis
October 5	Live Alone and Like It	Marjorie Hillis
October 12	Live Alone and Like It	Marjorie Hillis
October 19	Live Alone and Like It	Marjorie Hillis
October 26	An American Doctor's Odyssey	Victor Heiser
November 2	An American Doctor's Odyssey	Victor Heiser
November 9	An American Doctor's Odyssey	Victor Heiser
November 16	Live Alone and Like It	Marjorie Hillis
November 23	An American Doctor's Odyssey	Victor Heiser
November 30	An American Doctor's Odyssey	Victor Heiser
December 7	An American Doctor's Odyssey	Victor Heiser
December 14	An American Doctor's Odyssey	Victor Heiser
December 21	An American Doctor's Odyssey	Victor Heiser
December 28	An American Doctor's Odyssey	Victor Heiser

== See also ==
- Publishers Weekly list of bestselling novels in the United States in the 1930s
