= The Realms of Being =

Book by George Santayana

Realms of Being (1942) is the last major work by Spanish-American philosopher George Santayana. Along with Scepticism and Animal Faith and The Life of Reason, it is his most notable work; the first two works concentrate primarily on epistemology and ethics respectively, whereas Realms of Being is mainly a work in the field of ontology.

Santayana builds on his Skepticism and Animal Faith, which he described as a sort of precursor to "a new system of philosophy", that would be developed fully in the present work. He defines four realms of being; The Realm of Essence, The Realm of Matter, The Realm of Truth, and The Realm of Spirit.

== Realms ==
=== The Realm of Essence ===
The Realm of Essence, in Santayana's view, has a type of primacy over the other realms. To him, essence is anything that is or has a character—this includes thoughts, imaginings, derivations of logic, and material objects. Nothing can be experienced but through these essences, and they "are the only things people ever see, and the last they notice." Essence is awareness, it is different from knowledge or from faith, which he defines later.

=== The Realm of Matter ===
Matter is the objective, material stuff of the universe. Staying true to his materialism, Santayana holds matter as the "primordial existential flux" and believes it can be, at least in some sense, known. His conception of matter is similar to Spinoza's substance; matter has no purpose, but constitutes the limitations of what can be. Humans can know matter only from a distance, symbolically:

Matter is in fact referred to by Santayana as a “metaphor” only, producing one of the more provocative aspects of his philosophy: science is no less literary than poetry in representing matter in that it must express its truths at a remove, through the lens of human bias.

— Internet Encyclopedia of Philosophy

Thus, while Santayana reveres and deeply respects science (and believes it useful for everyday experiences), he does not deify it in the way many other philosophers of the 20th century have, and he limits it to a fallible approximation of truth.

=== The Realm of Truth ===
The Realm of Truth was thought of well after Santayana had thought of his other three realms; he envisions it as a sort of subdivision of the Realm of Essence. Truth is that part of the Realm of Essences instantiated by matter; indeed, he says:

Truth is the furrow which matter must plow upon the face of essence.

As the Internet Encyclopedia of Philosophy entry on Santayana says:

All events that take place entail concatenations of essences elected by matter for appearance in the course of human life, and their objective relations—factual arrangement, for example, that the terrorist attacks in America in 2001 took place on September 11th rather than the 12th—introduce the possibility of truth for human understanding.

Santayana here departs from classical pragmatists, of whom he is often considered one, in that he believes truth has a strong element outside of experience, and must coincide with what actually is.

=== The Realm of Spirit ===
Spirit is, as used by Santayana, very much akin to consciousness; it is, according to John Lachs, "part of a life constituted by its series of intuitions." Santayana believes that the mind is more accustomed to essence than it is to fact, and, as such, consciousness may at times manifest things that are not fact. Herein is to be found the Realm of Spirit; it is Santayana's attempt to reconcile the theories of Plato and the demands of reason.

== See also ==
- The Internet Encyclopedia of Philosophy Entry on Santayana by Matthew C. Flamm.
