= The Life of Reason =

Book by George Santayana

The Life of Reason: The Phases of Human Progress is a book published in five volumes from 1905 to 1906, by Spanish-born American philosopher George Santayana. It consists of Reason in Common Sense, Reason in Society, Reason in Religion, Reason in Art, and Reason in Science.

The work is considered to be the most complete expression of Santayana's moral philosophy; by contrast, his later magnum opus, the four-volume The Realms of Being, more fully develops his metaphysical and epistemological theory, particularly his doctrine of essences. Santayana's philosophy is strongly influenced by the materialism of Democritus and the refined ethics of Aristotle, with a special emphasis on the natural development of ideal ends.

The Life of Reason is sometimes considered to be one of the most poetic and well-written works of philosophy in Western history. To supply but a single example, the oft-quoted aphorism of Santayana's, "Those who cannot remember the past are condemned to repeat it," may be found on p. 284 of Reason in Common Sense.

In 1951, near the end of his life, Santayana engaged himself in the weighty task of producing a one-volume abridgment of The Life of Reason at the urging of his editor at Scribner's, with the assistance of his friend and student, Daniel Cory. As Cory writes in the volume's preface, in addition to excising prolixities and redundancies from the book, "[a] sustained effort was made to dispel those early mists of idealism from the realistic body of his philosophy, and to make clear to the reader that our idea of a natural world can never be that world itself."

== Volumes ==
Entries are needed for the other two volumes: Reason in Common Sense - the 1st volume - and also Reason in Art.

=== Reason in Society ===
Santayana wishes, according to Will Durant, to "devise a means whereby men may be persuaded to virtue without the stimulus of supernatural hopes and fears." Unfortunately, as he says in 'Reason in Society', "a truly rational morality or social regimen has never existed in the world, and is hardly to be looked for" as such constructions are the luxury of philosophers. The non-philosopher must rely upon the "growth of those social emotions which bloom in the generous atmosphere of love and the home."

He agrees with Arthur Schopenhauer that, in love, "nine-tenths of the cause of love are in the lover, for one-tenth that may be in the object" and that love "fuses the soul again into the impersonal blind flux." Despite this, he still champions love as the most fulfilling experience of life: "Laplace is reported to have said on his deathbed that science was mere trifling, and that nothing was real but love." Families and children are immensely important too, as, "we commit the blotted manuscript of our lives more willingly to the flames, when we find the immortal text half engrossed in a fairer copy."

Though families provide the basic unit of organization among men, it is necessary to develop beyond them. For this, he advocates a sort of natural aristocracy, for though the state is "a monster," he accepts its necessity in maintaining stability and safety for its constituents. This 'natural aristocracy' (a term never used by Santayana; taken instead from Thomas Jefferson) is built upon Santayana's dislike of equality—he argues, with Plato, that "the equality of unequals is inequality"—though he still champions equality of opportunity. Moreover, Santayana distrusts democracy, and sees it as "a vulgar, anonymous tyranny," much like Plato. His society would be, roughly, a meritocracy in which the most competent and capable would govern, with all men and women possessing an open road to government: "The only equality subsisting would be equality of opportunity." In a phrase anticipating John Rawls, Santayana says: "but for the excellence of the typical single life no nation deserves to be remembered more than the sands of the sea;" indeed, in A Theory of Justice Rawls notes that " the natural aristocracy [of Santayana] is a possible interpretation of the two principles of justice," though he ultimately rejects such a conception in favour of democratic equality.

Santayana advocates such a mix of aristocracy and democracy, and believes that under such a system art and science would flourish, and corruption be minimized. Corruption abounds in common governments, which often become a vehicle for war, the worst of all crimes of the state. Over-Patriotism too is abject to him, and he sees it responsible for many of the crimes of the state. Though he proposes no philosophy of international relations, he muses that the development of international sports could provide something of "a moral equivalent for war" and that finance and trade between nations may help foster more peace between them.

At last, he laments the rise of industrialism; quoting Emerson: "things are in the saddle and ride mankind." Leisure is critically important to a society, and necessary for the development of culture and arts, since "civilization has hitherto consisted in the diffusion and dilution of habits arising in privileged centers." The American Dream and the dream of "laissez-faire industrialism" is a lie, and is responsible for the endless struggles of modern man.

=== Reason in Religion ===
Though a philosophical atheist, Santayana is often described as an aesthetic Catholic. Influenced by his Spanish Roman Catholic heritage, he laments his own loss of faith, calling religious (especially Catholic) belief a "splendid error".

Durant says he: "achieves his masterpiece in 'Reason in Religion', filling his skeptical pages with a tender sadness, and finding in the beauty of Catholicism plentiful cause for loving it still." Santayana scorns the harsh treatment of religion by many "worm-eaten old satirists," and emphasizes the importance of understanding religion for understanding man, since religion is common to all men. With the touch of a poet, he lauds the beauty of religious myths while condemning literal treatment of religion to the flames. He especially derides the "northern barbarians" who are responsible for Protestantism, and believes they are mostly responsible for its literal interpretation and the loss of Christianity's poetry.

=== Reason in Science ===
Santayana holds that reason bases itself on science, as "science contains all trustworthy knowledge." Though he acknowledges the limitations of science and reason in finding metaphysical truths, he holds the scientific method as "merely a shorthand description of regularities observed in our experience" and says in Reason in Common Sense: "faith in the intellect...is the only faith yet sanctioned by its fruits."

Proposing no technically new metaphysic, Santayana instead applies old philosophies to the modern day. He admires the atomism of Democritus and emphasis upon technically reason of Aristotle. Santayana is a materialist and a naturalist, and strongly dislikes the more mystical metaphysics of many of his contemporaries; he rejects even the pantheism of Spinoza, saying that "the word nature is poetical enough; it suggest sufficiently the generative and controlling function, the endless vitality and changeful order of the world in which I live."

Materialism and mechanism are the governing forces of the universe; there is nothing outside their laws, and nothing exempt—humans included. Staying true to this materialism, Santayana rejects the existence of a transcendent soul, instead positing that "the soul is only a fine quick organization within the material animal." He also rejects immortality in the common sense of the word, saying in Skepticism and Animal Faith: "I believe there is nothing immortal...No doubt the spirit and energy of the world is what is acting in us, as the sea is what rises in every little wave; but it passes through us; and, cry out as we may, it will move on. Our privilege is to have perceived it as it moved." He does, however, espouse an unorthodox, Spinozist view of immortality:

He who lives in the ideal and leaves it expressed in society or in art enjoys a double immortality. The eternal has absorbed him while he lived, and when he is dead his influence brings others to the same absorption, making them, through that ideal identity with the best in him, reincarnations and perennial seats of all in him which he could rationally hope to rescue from destruction. He can say, without any subterfuge or desire to delude himself, that he shall not wholly die; for he will have a better notion than the vulgar of what constitutes his being. By becoming the spectator and confessor of his own death and of universal mutation, he will have identified himself with what is spiritual in all spirits and masterful in all apprehension; and so conceiving himself, he may truly feel and know that he is eternal.
—Reason in Religion, p. 273.

== Bibliography ==
- Reason in Common Sense, 1905
- Reason in Society, 1905
- Reason in Religion, 1905
- Reason in Art, 1905
- Reason in Science, 1906
