= David Cory =

David Cory may refer to:

- David Cory (author) (1872–1966), American children's author
- David G. Cory, Canadian chemist and physicist
- David Cory (politician) (born 1928), member of the Queensland Legislative Assembly
