= Tom Rockmore =

American philosopher (1942–2026)

- Born: Thomas Rockmore; March 4, 1942; New York City, U.S.
- Died: August 6, 2026 (aged 84); Nice, France

Education
- Education: Carleton College (BA 1963); Vanderbilt University (PhD, 1973); Université de Poitiers (Hab., 1994)
- Thesis: Man as Activity in Fichte and Marx (1973)
- Doctoral advisor: John Lachs

Philosophical work
- Era: Contemporary philosophy
- Region: Western philosophy
- School: Continental philosophy
- Institutions: Yale University (1973–1980); Fordham University (1982–1985); Duquesne University (1987–2007)
- Main interests: German idealism, Marxism, aesthetics
- Notable ideas: Criticism of representationalism in epistemology

Thomas Rockmore (March 4, 1942 – August 6, 2026) was an American philosopher. Although he denied the usual distinction between philosophy and the history of philosophy, he had strong interests throughout the history of philosophy and defended a constructivist view of epistemology. The philosophers whom he studied extensively were Kant, Fichte, Hegel, Marx, Lukács, and Heidegger.

== Early life and education ==
Rockmore was born in New York City on March 4, 1942. He graduated from Carleton College with a BA in philosophy in 1963, then received his Ph.D. from Vanderbilt University in 1973 on Man as Activity in Fichte and Marx under supervision of John Lachs; he received a Habilitation à diriger des recherches from the Université de Poitiers in 1994.

== Career ==
Rockmore was Distinguished Professor Emeritus at Duquesne University, as well as Distinguished Humanities Chair Professor at Peking University.

He began his teaching career at Yale University (1973–1980), then worked in several brief positions including Fordham University (1982–1985), Université Laval (1985–1986), and Wesleyan University (1986–1987), before settling at Duquesne in 1987.

== Philosophy ==
Rockmore was a strong critic of representationalism in epistemology. This is the view that the mind has access to external reality via copies of that reality that the mind receives from the object. It assumes a metaphysical realism, in which there is an external reality independent of the knower. Instead, Rockmore argues for a constructivist view on the basis of which the mind, on the basis of its experience, forms concepts and ideas that become the basis of its knowledge. This shift has significant consequences for phenomenology, aesthetics, and political philosophy. It further questions the transcendental claims particularly of early phenomenology.

As a historian of philosophy, Rockmore showed how German idealism influenced the development of both continental and analytic philosophy. He claimed that Marx, in particular, was influenced by the thought of Kant, Schelling, Fichte, and Hegel. However, he argued that Marx's thought was significantly misunderstood by Engels, whose influence led to the development of versions of Marxism inconsistent with much in Marx's original thinking.

Rockmore's political philosophy focused on the effect of representational thinking on certain ideological strains that cause problematic political decisions in both Western and non-Western states.

He also published on aesthetics.

== Death ==
Rockmore died in Nice, France, on August 6, 2026, at the age of 84.

== Selected bibliography ==
- Fichte, Marx, and the German Philosophical Tradition. Carbondale: Southern Illinois University Press, 1980. ISBN 9780809309559
- Hegel's Circular Epistemology. Bloomington: Indiana University Press, 1986. ISBN 9780253327130
- Habermas on Historical Materialism. Bloomington: Indiana University Press, 1989. ISBN 9780253327093
- Irrationalism. Lukács and the Marxist View of Reason. Philadelphia: Temple University Press, 1991. ISBN 9780877228677
- On Heidegger's Nazism and Philosophy. Berkeley: University of California Press, 1992. ISBN 9780520077119
- Before and After Hegel: A Historical Introduction to Hegel's Thought. Hackett Publishing, 1993. ISBN 9780872206489
- Heidegger and French Philosophy: Humanism, Antihumanism and Being. Routledge, 1995. ISBN 9780415111805
- On Hegel's Epistemology and Contemporary Philosophy. Humanity Books, 1996. ISBN 9781573923514
- Cognition: An Introduction to Hegel's Phenomenology of Spirit. Berkeley: University of California Press, 1997. ISBN 9780520206618
- Marx After Marxism: The Philosophy of Karl Marx. London: Wiley Blackwell, 2002. ISBN 9780631231899
- On Foundationalism: A Strategy for Metaphysical Realism. Lanham: Rowman & Littlefield, 2004. ISBN 9780742534278
- On Constructivist Epistemology. Lanham: Rowman & Littlefield, 2005. ISBN 9780742543201
- Hegel, Idealism and Analytic Philosophy. New Haven: Yale University Press, 2005. ISBN 9780300104509
- In Kant's Wake: Philosophy in the Twentieth Century. London: Wiley Blackwell, 2006. ISBN 9781405125703
- Kant and Idealism. New Haven: Yale University Press, 2007. ISBN 9780300120080
- Kant and Phenomenology. Chicago: University of Chicago Press, 2011. ISBN 9780226723402
- Before and After 9/11: A Philosophical Examination of Globalization, Terror, and History. New York: Bloomsbury Academic, 2011. ISBN 9781441118929
- Art and Truth after Plato. Chicago: University of Chicago Press, 2013. ISBN 9780226272634
- German Idealism as Constructivism. Chicago: University of Chicago Press, 2016. ISBN 9780226349909
- Marx's Dream: From Capitalism to Communism. Chicago: University of Chicago, 2018. ISBN 9780226554525

== See also ==
- American philosophy
- List of American philosophers
