= Scepticism and Animal Faith =

Book by George Santayana

- Dustjacket of the first edition
- Author: George Santayana
- Language: English
- Subject: Epistemology
- Publication date: 1923
- Media type: Print
- Pages: 314 (Dover Books edition)
- ISBN: 0-486-20236-4 (Dover Books edition)

Scepticism and Animal Faith (1923) is a later work by Spanish-born American philosopher George Santayana. He intended it to be "merely the introduction to a new system of philosophy," a work that would later be called The Realms of Being, which constitutes the bulk of his philosophy, along with The Life of Reason.

Scepticism is Santayana's major treatise on epistemology; after its publication, he wrote no more on the topic. His preface begins humbly, with Santayana saying:

Here is one more system of philosophy. If the reader is tempted to smile, I can assure him that I smile with him...I am merely trying to express for the reader the principles to which he appeals when he smiles.

Moreover, he does not claim philosophical supremacy:

I do not ask anyone to think in my terms if he prefers others. Let him clean better, if he can, the windows of his soul, that the variety and beauty of the prospect may spread more brightly before him.

While Santayana acknowledges the importance of skepticism to philosophy, and begins by doubting almost everything; from here, he seeks to find some kind of epistemological truths. Idealism is correct, claims Santayana, but is of no consequence. He makes this pragmatic claim by asserting that men do not live by the principles of idealism, even if it is true. We have functioned for eons without adhering to such principles, and may continue, pragmatically, as such. He posits the necessity of the eponymous "Animal Faith", which is belief in that which our senses tell us; "Philosophy begins in medias res", he assures us at the beginning of his treatise.
