= The Sense of Beauty =

1896 book by George Santayana

- Cover of the first edition
- Author: George Santayana
- Language: English
- Subject: Aesthetics
- Publisher: Charles Scribner's sons
- Publication date: 1896
- Publication place: United States
- Media type: Print
- Pages: 168 (Dover Books edition)
- ISBN: 0-486-20238-0 (Dover Books edition)

The Sense of Beauty is a book on aesthetics by the philosopher George Santayana. The book was published in 1896 by Charles Scribner's Sons, and is based on the lectures Santayana gave on aesthetics while teaching at Harvard University. Santayana published the book out of necessity, for tenure, rather than inspiration. In an anecdote retold by art critic Arthur Danto of a meeting with Santayana in 1950, Santayana was reported to have said that "they let me know through the ladies that I had better publish a book... on art, of course. So I wrote this wretched potboiler."

The book is divided into four parts: "The Nature of Beauty", "The Materials of Beauty", "Form", and "Expression". Beauty, as defined by Santayana, is an "objectified pleasure." It does not originate from divine inspiration, as was commonly described by philosophers, but from a naturalistic psychology. Santayana objects to the role of God in aesthetics in the metaphysical sense, but accepts the use of God as metaphor. His argument that beauty is a human experience, based on the senses, is influential in the field of aesthetics. However, Santayana would reject this approach, which he called "skirt[ing] psychologism," later on in life.

According to Santayana, beauty is linked to pleasure, and is fundamental to human purpose and experience. Beauty does not originate from pleasurable experiences, by itself, or from the objects that bring about pleasure. It is when the experience and emotion of pleasure intertwines with the qualities of the object that beauty arises. Beauty is a "manifestation of perfection", and as Santayana writes, "the sense of beauty has a more important place in life than aesthetic theory has ever taken in philosophy."

== Summary ==
The Sense of Beauty is subdivided into a preface, an introduction (The Methods of Aesthetics), four main parts, and a conclusion. Each part contains several paragraphs which are numbered consecutively throughout the work. The conclusion is numbered as the last paragraph § 67.

=== Part I. — The Nature of Beauty ===
The first part of The Sense of Beauty is devoted to the development of a definition of beauty.

Santayana rejects the previous notion of beauty as ″the symbol of divine perfection″ and instead builds his theory of beauty on a re-definition of aesthetics being concerned with ″the perception of values″ (§1). He clarifies that the experience of beauty cannot arise from judgments of fact, but only from judgments of value (§2). Judgments of value can be moral or aesthetic; moral judgments, however, are primarily negative and benefit-oriented, whereas aesthetic judgments are mainly positive and immediate (§3, §5, §7). Aesthetic pleasures in contrast to physical pleasures do not draw attention to the organ through which they are experienced, but to the external object causing the pleasure (§7). Santayana rejects the notion of disinterestedness as defining property, because he sees one sense of disinterestedness in pleasure, because pleasure ″is not sought with ulterior motives [...] but [with] the image of an object or event stuffed with emotion.″(§8) Santayana derives his main definition of beauty from what he calls ″psychological phenomenon, viz., the transformation of an element of sensation into the quality of a thing″, and with repeated exposure, only a small subset of sensations remains to be regarded as ″quality″ of the object (§10). Beauty is finally defined as ″pleasure as the quality of a thing.″ (§11), forming an exception in that it is an emotion and not a sensation that becomes an object's quality (§10). It is further clarified that beauty is ″intrinsic″ in that it originates from the perception of the object, not a consequence or utility of that object (§11).

=== Part II. — The Materials of Beauty ===
The second part of The Sense of Beauty is concerned with identifying the modalities - the so-called sensuous materials of things - that can (not) be associated with the experience of beauty.

First, Santayana claims that pleasures derived from all human functions may become objectified and hence the material of beauty, albeit this is most easily done in the cases of vision, hearing, memory and imagination (§12, §18). He describes sight as "perception par excellence" and form as usually visual experience to be "almost a synonym of beauty" (§17). Form, however, which needs constructive imagination, is preceded by the effects of color in vision (§17). The example of sound serves as an example for the delicate balance between simplicity ("purity" in Santayana's terms) and variety that leads to the experience of beauty: Discrimination of tones from the chaos of sound is pleasurable, but the pure tone of a tuning-fork is dull (§15). Santayana states that touch, taste, and smell are less likely to lead to "objectified" pleasure, because they ″remain normally in the background of consciousness" (§15).

Santayana further distinguishes vital (bodily) from social functions (§12) with sexual instinct as an intermediate form between them (§13). The latter is acknowledged to have a profound influence on humans' emotional lives, generating a passion that overflows to other topics if not directed towards another human (§13). Because of their abstract nature, however, Santayana regards social objects, such as success or money, as less likely to attract aesthetic pleasure, because they are too abstract to be directly imaginable (§14).

Santayana notes that sensuous material a) is necessary for finding or creating beauty (how else could one perceive the poem, building, etc. in question?), and b) can add to the experience of beauty as the sensuous material itself may elicit pleasure (§18).

=== Part III. — Form ===
In the third part of his book, Santayana turns to describing which experiences can lead to the experience of beauty and why or under which circumstances. Form can be taken literally here in the beginning, but becomes a synonym for mental representations as the section proceeds.

He starts by emphasizing that it is only in their combination that sensual elements are able to please (§19) and he directly relates this pleasure to being conscious of the physiological processes underlying them (§21). He identifies symmetry (§22) and a balance between uniformity and multiplicity (§23-24) as eliciting such a pleasing perceptual experience; as an example he uses the beauty one finds in the stars (§25). Santayana points out that memories and other predispositions (″mental habits″) contribute to the perception of an object and hence of its value (§28) - that may ultimately be beauty. Here, another distinction is made between ″value of a form″ and ″value of the type as such″; in the latter sense, an object also has a value in how well it is an example of its class (§28).

Santayana here also introduces the concept of ″indeterminate″ objects that are in some way vague or incoherent and thus require and allow the observer to further interpret it (§32), such as landscapes (§33). Due to the necessary contribution of the observer to the perception of indeterminate objects, Santayana also claims that the beauty of these objects depends on the observer (§35).

Considering all the aspects contributing to the potential experience of beauty, it may come to no or little surprise that Santayana most generally stated: ″Everything is beautiful because everything is capable in some degree of interesting and charming our attention; but things differ immensely in this capacity to please us in the contemplation of them, and therefore they differ immensely in beauty.″ (§31)

In contrast to Plato and Socrates Santayana does not necessarily see a relation between beauty and utility (§38-40). After this last more general consideration about the forms of beauty, he turns to an analysis of beauty in language and literature (§42-47).

Even though digressions from his main topic, Santayana in this chapter reveals a number of thoughts and insights that mirror parts of later scientific theories:

- In his reasoning about how people actually come to have a mental representation of a ″class″ (§29), Santayana's explanations have much in common with the later developed psychological Prototype theory.
- His account for a bias towards emphasizing and literally enlarging aesthetic ideals in the direction of aesthetic interests parallels the Peak Shift Principle as also mentioned in Ramachandran's and Hirnstein's Laws of Artistic Experience.

=== Part IV. — Expression ===
Santayana devotes the last part of his book to the qualities that an object acquires indirectly by means of associations, (such as with other concepts and memories), which he calls "expression" (§48). The pleasures that are elicited by such an association is said to yield pleasure just as immediately as the perception of the object itself (§49). However, an expression - which is merely a thought or meaning - cannot elicit beauty in and by itself; it needs an object that gives it a sensual representation (§50). Aesthetic value may thus have two sources: 1) in the process of perceiving an object itself, called sensuous and formal beauty, and 2) value derived from the formation of other ideas, called beauty of expression (§59).

One question that arises from the possibility that expressions could take any value is: What happens if an object's expression is negative? Santayana's answer is that the object itself may nonetheless be beautiful (§50) and thus even if the evil is portrayed, e.g. in a play or novel, we can experience beauty in spite of the suggestion of evil (§56).

The expression of - or the association with - monetary value is one Santayana addresses very directly. To him, the price of an object per se cannot add to its aesthetic value; only if the observer re-interprets the price as the human work and craft invested in that object can it add to the object's value (§53). The utility of an object in more general terms is said to be able to enrich or diminish the beauty of an object - if it fits its purpose well, this may add to the object's beauty, but knowledge about unfitness for the given purpose may also spoil the experience of beauty (§54).

Additionally, this last part of the book also gives a definition of the sublime as ″the intoxicatingly beautiful″ (§60). While during the experience of beauty, one is said to take pleasure in contemplation, to sink into the object, the pure perfection of the sublime dissolves the object altogether. One gets lost in ″a sort of ecstasy″ (§60).

=== § 67. Conclusion ===
Santayana concludes his book with the notion that beauty cannot be described in words. Nonetheless, he does give one last description of the sense of beauty as the realization of ″the harmony between our nature and our experience″. Under the premise that perfection is ″the ultimate justification of being″ Santayana ends with the statement: ″ Beauty is a pledge of the possible conformity between the soul and nature, and consequently a ground of faith in the supremacy of the good.″

== Reception ==
The German philosopher Ernst Cassirer criticized Santayana's characterization of art as "the response to the demand for entertainment" in contrast to science which seeks to deliver truthful information. Cassirer called Santayana's position "aesthetic hedonism" and refused its idea (as he understood it) that art is merely entertainment. "To think," Cassirer wrote, "that the great artists worked for this purpose — that Michelangelo constructed Saint Peter's church, that Dante or Milton wrote their poems, that Bach composed his Mass in B-minor for the sake of entertainment — is an absurdity."
