= George Santayana =

Spanish American philosopher (1863–1952)

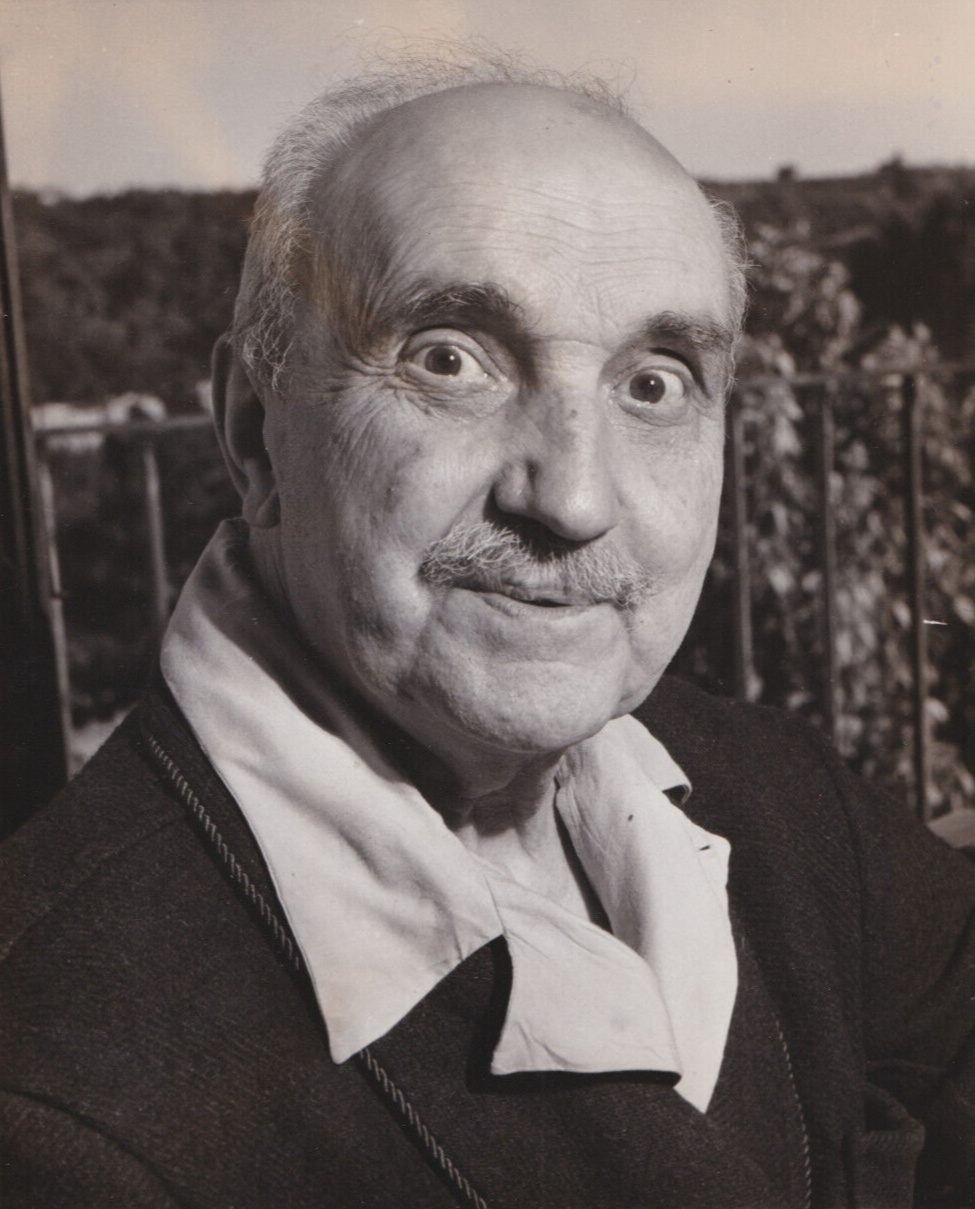
- Santayana in 1947
- Born: Jorge Agustín Nicolás Ruiz de Santayana y Borrás; December 16, 1863; Madrid, Spain
- Died: September 26, 1952 (aged 88); Rome, Italy

Education
- Education: Harvard University (AB, PhD); King's College, Cambridge
- Doctoral advisor: Josiah Royce

Philosophical work
- Era: 20th-century philosophy
- Region: Western philosophy
- School: Pragmatism; naturalism; conservatism
- Institutions: Harvard University
- Notable students: Conrad Aiken, Van Wyck Brooks, Witter Bynner, W. E. B. Du Bois, Max Eastman, T. S. Eliot, Felix Frankfurter, Learned Hand, Horace Kallen, Walter Lippmann, Alain Locke, Jacob Loewenberg, Edward Rand, Gertrude Stein, Wallace Stevens
- Main interests: Moral philosophy; political philosophy; epistemology; metaphysics; philosophy of religion
- Notable ideas: Lucretian materialism; Skepticism; Natural aristocracy; Realms of Being; Beauty as pleasure objectified; Criticism of German idealism; Criticism of scientistic materialism

George Santayana (born Jorge Agustín Nicolás Ruiz de Santayana y Borrás, December 16, 1863 – September 26, 1952) was a Spanish American philosopher, essayist, poet, and novelist. Born in Spain, he moved to the United States at the age of eight.

As a philosopher, Santayana is known for aphorisms, such as "Those who cannot remember the past are condemned to repeat it", and "Only the dead have seen the end of war", and his definition of beauty as "pleasure objectified".

Although an atheist, Santayana respected the culture of the Spanish Catholic values, practices, and worldview, in which he was raised. As an intellectual, George Santayana was a broad-range cultural critic in several academic disciplines.

At the age of 48, he left his academic position at Harvard University and permanently returned to Europe; his last will was to be buried in the Spanish Pantheon in the Campo di Verano, Rome.

== Early life ==
George Santayana was born on December 16, 1863, in Calle de San Bernardo of Madrid and spent his early childhood in Ávila, Spain. His mother Josefina Borrás was the daughter of a Spanish official in the Philippines and he was the only child of her second marriage. Josefina Borrás' first husband was George Sturgis, a Boston merchant with the Manila firm Russell & Sturgis. She had five children with him; two of them died in infancy. She lived in Boston for a few years following her husband's death in 1857; in 1861, she moved with her three surviving children to Madrid. There she encountered Agustín Ruiz de Santayana, an old friend from her years in the Philippines. They married in 1862. A colonial civil servant, Ruiz de Santayana was a painter and minor intellectual. The family lived in Madrid and Ávila, and Jorge was born in Spain in 1863.

In 1869, Josefina Borrás de Santayana returned to Boston with her three Sturgis children, because she had promised her first husband to raise the children in the US. She left the six-year-old Jorge with his father in Spain. Jorge and his father followed her to Boston in 1872. His father, finding neither Boston nor his wife's attitude to his liking, soon returned alone to Ávila, and remained there the rest of his life. Jorge did not see him again until he entered Harvard College and began to take his summer vacations in Spain. Although Santayana was raised and educated in the United States from the age of eight and identified as an American, he always retained a valid Spanish passport. Sometime during this period, his first name Jorge was anglicized to its English equivalent: George.

== Education ==
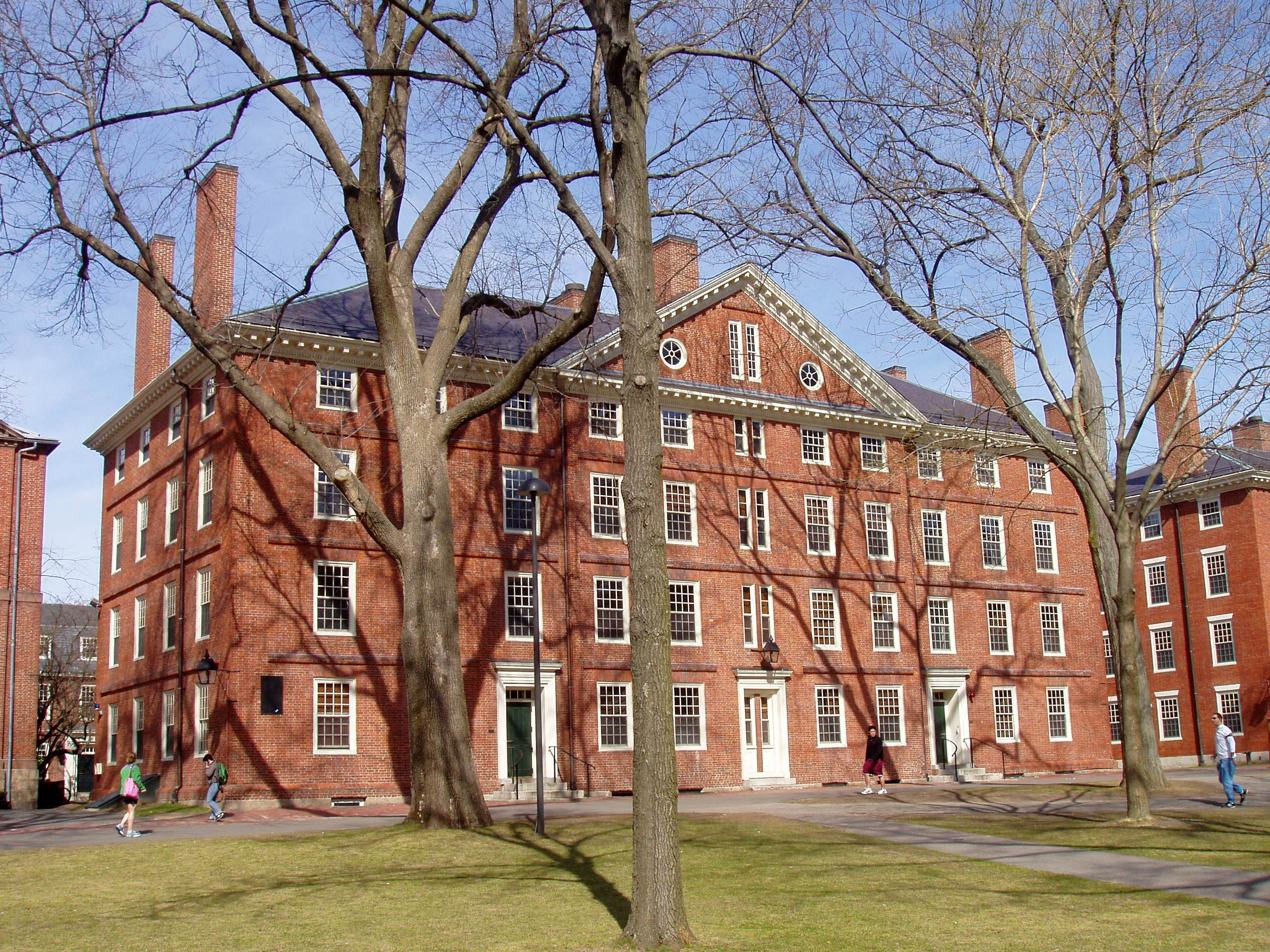
Santayana lived in Hollis Hall as a student at Harvard.

Santayana attended Boston Latin School and Harvard College, where he studied under the philosophers William James and Josiah Royce and was involved in eleven clubs. He was founder and president of the Philosophical Club, a member of the literary society known as the O.K., an editor and cartoonist for The Harvard Lampoon, he joined one of Harvard's "Final Clubs", the Delphic Club, and co-founded the literary journal The Harvard Monthly. In December, 1885, he played the role of Lady Elfrida in the Hasty Pudding theatrical Robin Hood, followed by the production Papillonetta in the spring of his senior year. He received his A.B. summa cum laude in 1886 and was elected to Phi Beta Kappa student fraternity. In 1886, Santayana studied for two years in Berlin. He then returned to Harvard to write his dissertation on German idealist Hermann Lotze (1889). Although schooled in German idealism, Santayana was critical of it and made an effort to distance himself from its epistemology.

He was a professor at Harvard from 1889 to 1912, becoming part of the Golden Age of the Harvard University Department of Philosophy. Some of his Harvard students became famous in their own right, including Conrad Aiken, W. E. B. Du Bois, T. S. Eliot, Robert Frost, Horace Kallen, Walter Lippmann, and Gertrude Stein. Wallace Stevens was not among his students but became a friend. From 1896 to 1897, Santayana studied at King's College, Cambridge.

== Later life ==
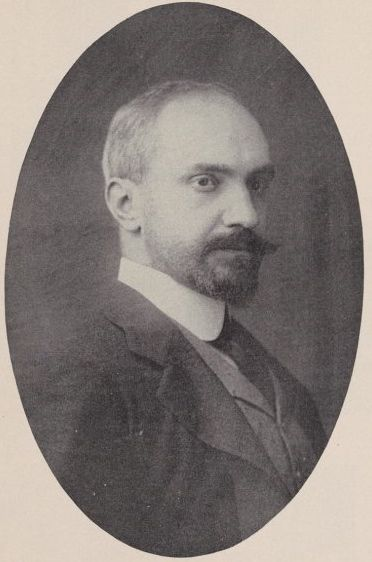
Santayana early in his career

Santayana never married. His romantic life, if any, is not well understood. Some evidence, including a comment Santayana made late in life comparing himself to A. E. Housman, and his friendships with people who were openly homosexual and bisexual, has led scholars to speculate that Santayana was perhaps homosexual or bisexual, but it remains unclear whether he had any actual heterosexual or homosexual relationships. Some historians would disagree with this assessment. For example, Santayana's biographer concluded that he had "an intense physical affair" with Frank Russell, 2nd Earl Russell, older brother to philosopher Bertrand Russell. The historian Douglass Shand-Tucci included an extensive discussion of Santayana's sexuality in his book on Boston's homosexual subculture in the late 19th century.

In 1912, Santayana resigned his position at Harvard to spend the rest of his life in Europe. He had saved money and been aided by a legacy from his mother. After some years in Ávila, Paris and Oxford, after 1920, he began to winter in Rome, eventually living there year-round until his death. During his 40 years in Europe, he wrote 19 books and declined several prestigious academic positions. Many of his visitors and correspondents were Americans, including his assistant and eventual literary executor, Daniel Cory. In later life, Santayana was financially comfortable, in part because his 1935 novel, The Last Puritan, had become an unexpected best-seller. In turn, he financially assisted a number of writers, including Bertrand Russell, with whom he was in fundamental disagreement, philosophically and politically.

Santayana's one novel, The Last Puritan, is a Bildungsroman, centering on the personal growth of its protagonist, a Puritan named Oliver Alden. His Persons and Places is an autobiography. These works also contain many of his sharper opinions and bons mots. He wrote books and essays on a wide range of subjects, including philosophy of a less technical sort, literary criticism, the history of ideas, politics, human nature, morals, the influence of religion on culture and social psychology, all with considerable wit and humour.

While his writings on technical philosophy can be difficult, his other writings are more accessible and pithy. He wrote poems and a few plays, and left ample correspondence, much of it published only since 2000. Like Alexis de Tocqueville, Santayana observed American culture and character from a foreigner's point of view. Like William James, his friend and mentor, he wrote philosophy in a literary way. Ezra Pound includes Santayana among his many cultural references in The Cantos, notably in "Canto LXXXI" and "Canto XCV". Santayana is usually considered a U.S. writer, although he declined to become a U.S. citizen, resided in Fascist Italy for decades, and said that he was most comfortable, intellectually and aesthetically, at Oxford University. Although an atheist, Santayana considered himself an "aesthetic Catholic" and spent the last decade of his life in Rome under the care of Catholic nuns. In 1941, he entered a hospital and convent run by the Little Company of Mary (also known as the Blue Nuns) on the Caelian Hill at 6 Via Santo Stefano Rotondo in Rome, where he was cared for by the sisters until his death in September 1952. Upon his death, he did not want to be buried in consecrated land, which made his burial problematic in Italy. Finally, the Spanish consulate in Rome agreed that he be buried in the Pantheon of the Obra Pía Española, in the Campo Verano cemetery in Rome.

== Philosophical work and publications ==
Santayana's main philosophical work consists of The Sense of Beauty (1896), his first book-length monograph and perhaps the first major work on aesthetics written in the United States; The Life of Reason (5 vols., 1905–06), the high point of his Harvard career; Scepticism and Animal Faith (1923); and The Realms of Being (4 vols., 1927–1940).

Although Santayana is roughly regarded as a pragmatist or as beginning his philosophy in pragmatic thought, his views depart from fellow American pragmatist Charles Sanders Peirce and even more significantly from the others like William James, Josiah Royce, or John Dewey. Santayana's The Life of Reason arguably is the first extended treatment of pragmatism written. However, like many of the classical pragmatists, Santayana was committed to metaphysical naturalism. He believed that human cognition, cultural practices, and social institutions have evolved so as to harmonize with the conditions present in their environment. Their value may then be adjudged by the extent to which they facilitate human happiness. The alternate title to The Life of Reason, "the Phases of Human Progress", is indicative of this metaphysical stance.

Santayana was an early adherent of epiphenomenalism, but also admired the classical materialism of Democritus and Lucretius. (Of the three authors on whom he wrote in Three Philosophical Poets, Santayana speaks most favorably of Lucretius). He held Spinoza's writings in high regard, calling him his "master and model".

Although an atheist, he held a fairly benign view of religion and described himself as an "aesthetic Catholic". Santayana's views on religion are outlined in his books Reason in Religion, The Idea of Christ in the Gospels, and Interpretations of Poetry and Religion.

He held racial supremacist and eugenic views. He believed superior races should be discouraged from "intermarriage with inferior stock".

== Legacy ==
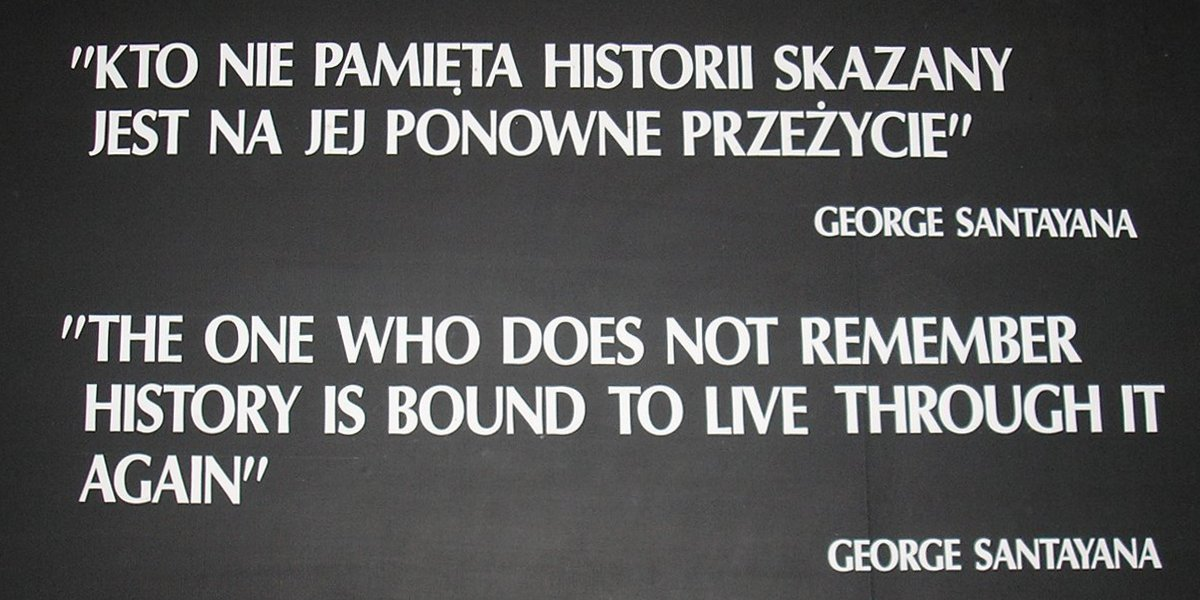

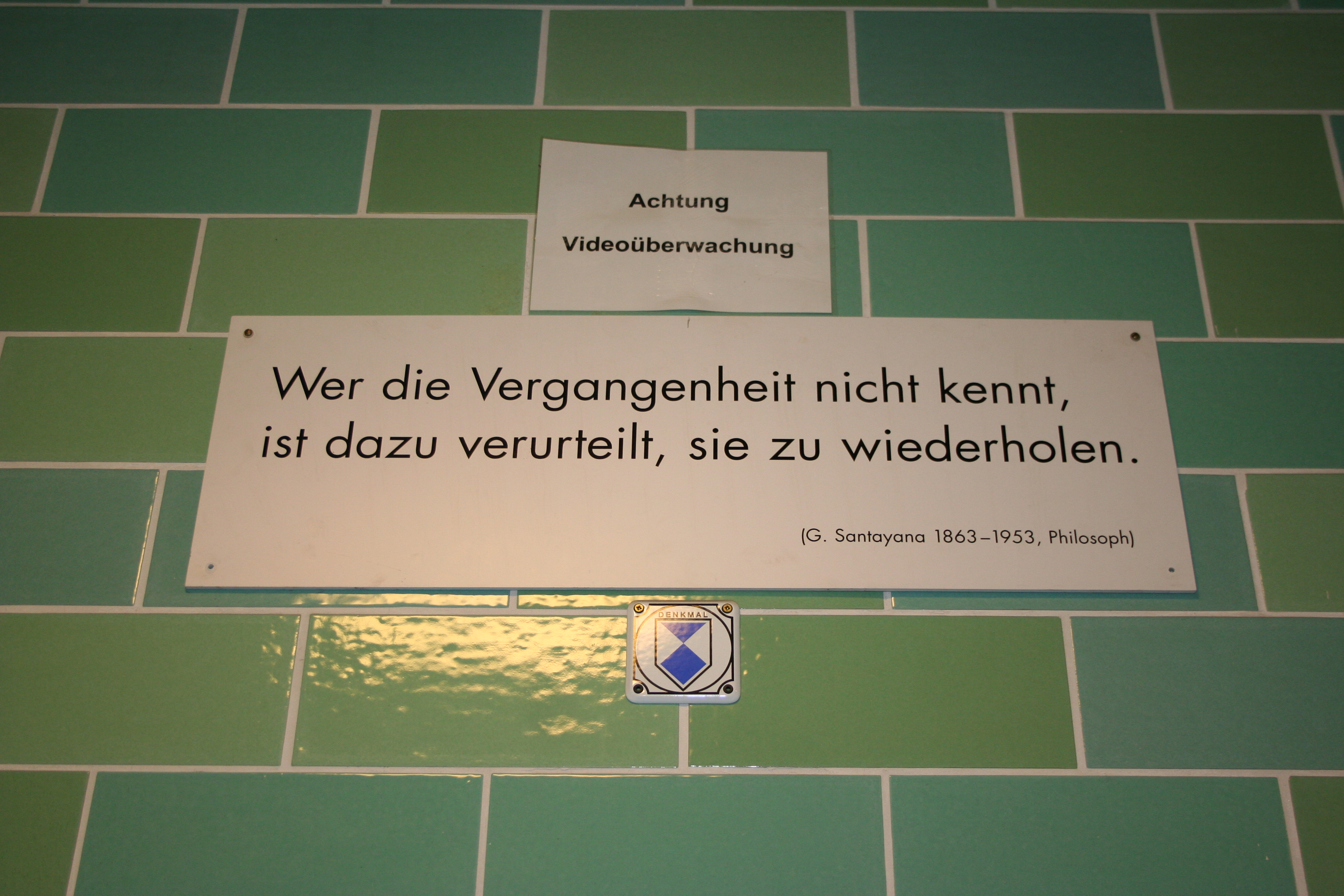
Santayana's famous aphorism "Those who cannot remember the past are condemned to repeat it" is inscribed on a plaque at the Auschwitz concentration camp in Polish translation and English back-translation (above), and on a subway placard in Germany (below).

Santayana is remembered in large part for his aphorisms, many of which have been so frequently used as to have become clichéd. His philosophy has not fared quite as well. He is regarded by most as an excellent prose stylist, and John Lachs (who is sympathetic with much of Santayana's philosophy) writes, in On Santayana, that his eloquence may ironically be the very cause of this neglect.

Santayana influenced those around him, including Bertrand Russell, whom Santayana single-handedly steered away from the ethics of G. E. Moore. He also influenced many prominent people such as Harvard students T. S. Eliot, Robert Frost, Gertrude Stein, Horace Kallen, Walter Lippmann, W. E. B. Du Bois, Conrad Aiken, Van Wyck Brooks, Felix Frankfurter, Max Eastman, and Wallace Stevens. Stevens was especially influenced by Santayana's aesthetics and became a friend even though Stevens did not take courses taught by Santayana.

Santayana is quoted by the Canadian-American sociologist Erving Goffman as a central influence in the thesis of his famous book The Presentation of Self in Everyday Life (1959). Religious historian Jerome A. Stone credits Santayana with contributing to the early thinking in the development of religious naturalism. English mathematician and philosopher Alfred North Whitehead quotes Santayana extensively in his magnum opus Process and Reality (1929).

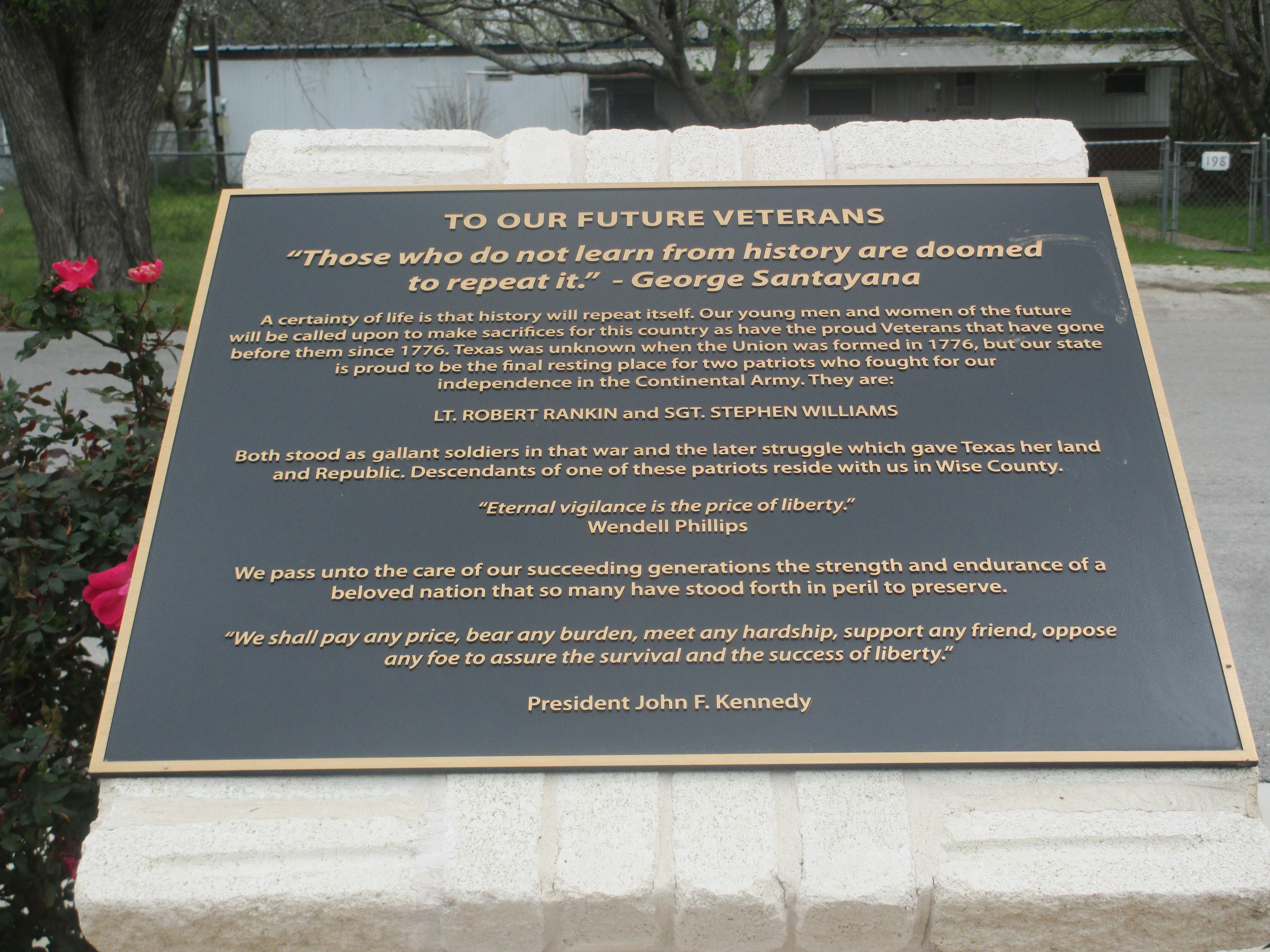
Along with Wendell Phillips and John F. Kennedy, Santayana is quoted on a military plaque at Veterans Memorial Park in Rhome, Texas.

Chuck Jones used Santayana's description of fanaticism as "redoubling your effort after you've forgotten your aim" to describe his cartoons starring Wile E. Coyote and Road Runner.

== In popular culture ==
Santayana's death is referenced in the lyrics to singer-songwriter Billy Joel's 1989 single "We Didn't Start the Fire".

Santayana's quotes about fanaticism and forgetting the past are mentioned in the Batman: The Animated Series episode "I Am the Night."

The quote "Only the dead have seen the end of war" is frequently attributed or misattributed to Plato; an early example of this misattribution (if it is indeed misattributed) is found in General Douglas MacArthur's Farewell Speech given to the Corps of Cadets at West Point in 1962.

== Awards ==
- Royal Society of Literature Benson Medal, 1925.
- Columbia University Butler Gold Medal, 1945.
- Honorary degree from the University of Wisconsin, 1911.

== Bibliography ==
Santayana's Reason in Common Sense was published in five volumes between 1905 and 1906 (this edition is from 1920).

Although schooled in German idealism, Santayana was critical of it and made an effort to distance himself from its epistemology.

- 1894. Sonnets and Other Verses.
- 1896. The Sense of Beauty: Being the Outline of Aesthetic Theory.
- 1899. Lucifer: A Theological Tragedy.
- 1900. Interpretations of Poetry and Religion.
- 1901. A Hermit of Carmel and Other Poems.
- 1905–1906. The Life of Reason: The Phases of Human Progress, 5 vols.
- 1910. Three Philosophical Poets: Lucretius, Dante, and Goethe.
- 1913. Winds of Doctrine: Studies in Contemporary Opinion.
- 1915. Egotism in German Philosophy.
- 1920. Character and Opinion in the United States: With Reminiscences of William James and Josiah Royce and Academic Life in America.
- 1920. Little Essays, Drawn From the Writings of George Santayana, by Logan Pearsall Smith, with the Collaboration of the Author.
- 1922. Soliloquies in England and Later Soliloquies.
- 1922. Poems.
- 1923. Scepticism and Animal Faith: Introduction to a System of Philosophy.
- 1926. Dialogues in Limbo
- 1927. Platonism and the Spiritual Life.
- 1927–1940. The Realms of Being, 4 vols.
- 1931. The Genteel Tradition at Bay.
- 1933. Some Turns of Thought in Modern Philosophy: Five Essays
- 1935. The Last Puritan: A Memoir in the Form of a Novel.
- 1936. Obiter Scripta: Lectures, Essays and Reviews. Justus Buchler and Benjamin Schwartz, eds.
- 1944. Persons and Places.
- 1945. The Middle Span.
- 1946. The Idea of Christ in the Gospels; or, God in Man: A Critical Essay.
- 1948. Dialogues in Limbo, With Three New Dialogues.
- 1951. Dominations and Powers: Reflections on Liberty, Society, and Government.
- 1953. My Host The World

=== Posthumous works ===
- 1955. The Letters of George Santayana. Daniel Cory, ed. Charles Scribner's Sons. New York. (296 letters)
- 1956. Essays in Literary Criticism of George Santayana. Irving Singer, ed.
- 1957. The Idler and His Works, and Other Essays. Daniel Cory, ed.
- 1967. The Genteel Tradition: Nine Essays by George Santayana. Douglas L. Wilson, ed.
- 1967. George Santayana's America: Essays on Literature and Culture. James Ballowe, ed.
- 1967. Animal Faith and Spiritual Life: Previously Unpublished and Uncollected Writings by George Santayana With Critical Essays on His Thought. John Lachs, ed.
- 1968. Santayana on America: Essays, Notes, and Letters on American Life, Literature, and Philosophy. Richard Colton Lyon, ed.
- 1968. Selected Critical Writings of George Santayana, 2 vols. Norman Henfrey, ed.
- 1969. Physical Order and Moral Liberty: Previously Unpublished Essays of George Santayana. John and Shirley Lachs, eds.
- 1979. The Complete Poems of George Santayana: A Critical Edition. Edited, with an introduction, by W. G. Holzberger. Bucknell University Press.
- 1995. The Birth of Reason and Other Essays. Daniel Cory, ed., with an Introduction by Herman J. Saatkamp Jr. Columbia Univ. Press.
- 2009. The Essential Santayana. Selected Writings Edited by the Santayana Edition, Compiled and with an introduction by Martin A. Coleman. Bloomington: Indiana University Press.
- 2009. The Genteel Tradition in American Philosophy and Character and Opinion in the United States (Rethinking the Western Tradition), Edited and with an introduction by James Seaton and contributions by Wilfred M. McClay, John Lachs, Roger Kimball, and James Seaton, Yale University Press.
- 2021. Recently Discovered Letters of George Santayana / Cartas recién descubiertas de George Santayana, Edited and with an introduction by Daniel Pinkas translated by Daniel Moreno, and a Prologue by José Beltrán.

=== The Works of George Santayana ===
Unmodernized, critical editions of George Santayana's published and unpublished writing. The Works is edited by the Santayana Edition and published by The MIT Press.

- 1986. Persons and Places. Santayana's autobiography, incorporating Persons and Places, 1944; The Middle Span, 1945; and My Host the World, 1953.
- 1988 (1896). The Sense of Beauty: Being the Outline of Aesthetic Theory.
- 1990 (1900). Interpretations of Poetry and Religion.
- 1994 (1935). The Last Puritan: A Memoir in the Form of a Novel.
- The Letters of George Santayana. Containing over 3,000 of his letters, many discovered posthumously, to more than 350 recipients.
  - 2001. Book One, 1868–1909.
  - 2001. Book Two, 1910–1920.
  - 2002. Book Three, 1921–1927.
  - 2003. Book Four, 1928–1932.
  - 2003. Book Five, 1933–1936.
  - 2004. Book Six, 1937–1940.
  - 2006. Book Seven, 1941–1947.
  - 2008. Book Eight, 1948–1952.
- 2011. George Santayana's Marginalia: A Critical Selection, Books 1 and 2. Compiled by John O. McCormick and edited by Kristine W. Frost.
- The Life of Reason in five books.
  - 2011 (1905). Reason in Common Sense.
  - 2013 (1905). Reason in Society.
  - 2014 (1905). Reason in Religion.
  - 2015 (1905). Reason in Art.
  - 2016 (1906). Reason in Science.
- 2019 (1910). Three Philosophical Poets: Lucretius, Dante, and Goethe, Critical Edition, Edited by Kellie Dawson and David E. Spiech, with an introduction by James Seaton
- 2023 (1913). Winds of Doctrine, Critical Edition, Edited by David E Spiech, Martin A. Coleman and Faedra Lazar Weiss, with an introduction by Paul Forster

== See also ==
- American philosophy
- Frederick J. E. Woodbridge
