= David Cory (author) =

American writer of children's books

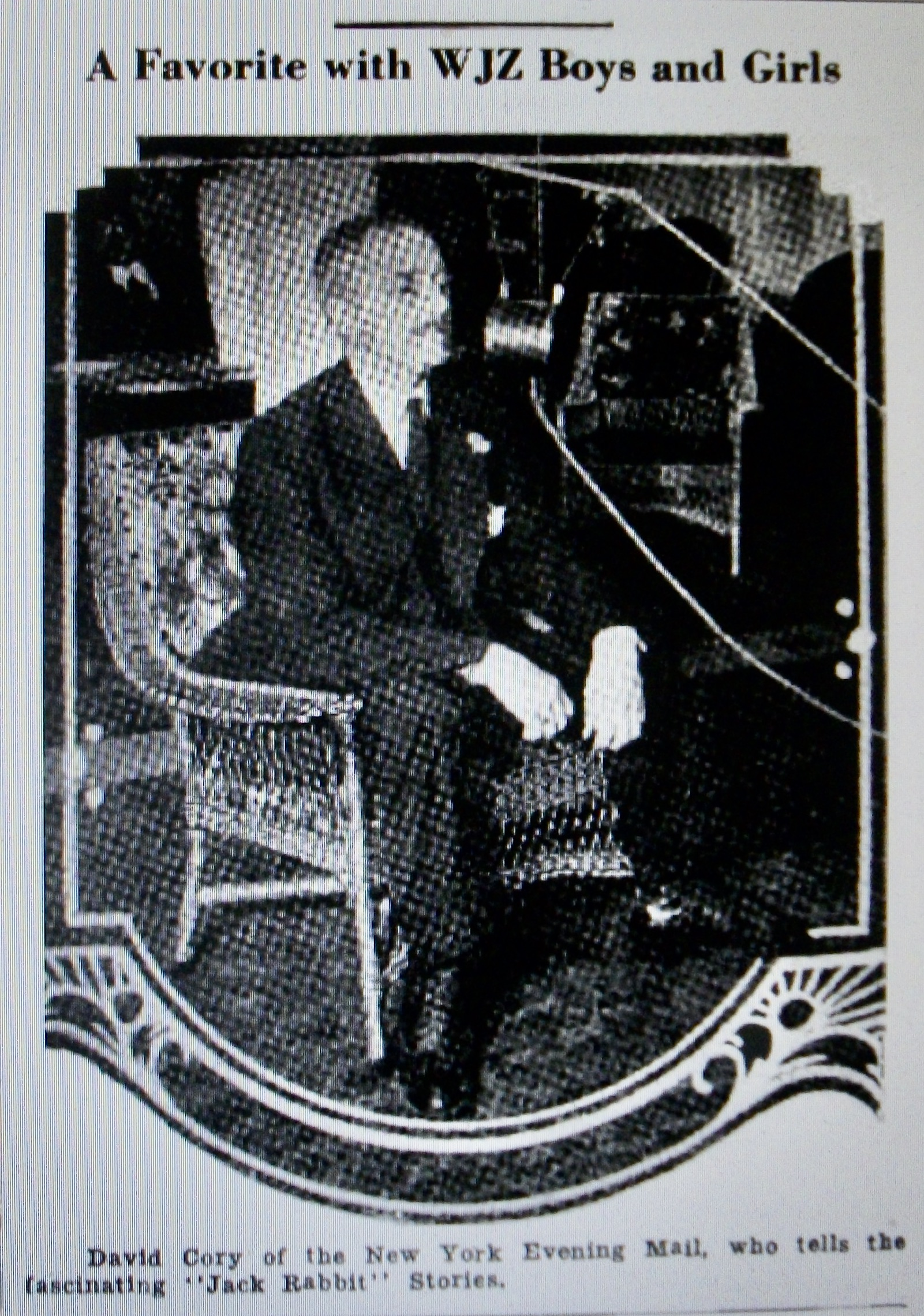
- David Cory at WJZ in Newark, NJ 1922
- Born: David Magie Cory; October 26, 1872; Oyster Bay, New York, U.S.
- Died: July 4, 1966 (aged 93); Brooklyn, New York, U.S.
- Other name: Uncle Dave
- Occupations: Writer, stockbroker
- Years active: 1914–1957 (writer)
- Spouse: Louise Elizabeth Treacy
- Children: 2, including Daniel Cory

David Magie Cory (October 26, 1872 – July 4, 1966) was a writer of more than fifty books for young children. He was best known for his Jack Rabbit stories, which were syndicated in newspapers for forty years.

== Early life ==
Cory was born in Oyster Bay, Long Island, New York on October 26, 1872. His parents were David Magie Cory and Ellen Monroe. He was a descendant of John Cory, one of the original European settlers of Southold, Long Island in 1640.

When he was twelve he moved to Englewood, New Jersey to live with his grandparents, Mr. and Mrs. George Munroe. His grandfather was a stockbroker. Cory attended the English and Classical School in Englewood. While at school he wrote compositions about forest animals.

In 1899 Cory became a stockbroker. When his two sons were old enough to understand stories, he began to make up bedtime stories for them.

"Oh, yes," he would say, when they asked for a tale, "this morning Lady Robin came to my window; fresh from the ‘Friendly Forest'," or "This morning, oh so early, little Miss Southwind, blown to our city in a cloud of snowflakes, told me she had visited the 'Friendly Forest' last night." And then the story would unravel itself, until the quaint little animals, each endowed with a name and personality, would array themselves in the minds of the children, and the end would come when "Mr. Lucky Lefthindfoot" would stop his "Luckymobile" to let pass a chain of busy ants on their way to school.

He wrote down his stories and turned them into homemade books for his boys. Neighborhood children would borrow the books, and they became so popular that a friend suggested he find a publisher for his work so that all children could enjoy what he wrote. Cory took fourteen of his stories to an editor, who accepted them for publication. For a time he was a stockbroker from 9:30 a.m. to 4:30 p.m. and wrote children’s stories during the evenings, on Sundays and holidays. Then he gave up his day job, and became a full-time writer.

== Writing career ==
In 1915 Cory began writing a daily Jack Rabbit bedtime story for the New York Evening Mail. In 1923 he switched newspapers, and his stories were printed in the New York Evening World. His Jack Rabbit stories were syndicated in newspapers for forty years. After his stories appeared in newspapers they were compiled into a series of books.

Other David Cory book series published in the 1920s include Puss-In-Boots, Jr., Little Journey to Happyland, and Billy Bunny.

During the 1930s Cory wrote the Little Indian book series. In the Acknowledgments of the volume entitled Hawk Eye Cory listed authors who helped him learn about the customs and legends of the Sioux. Those authors included George Bird Grinnell and Charles Eastman.

== Radio work and story telling tours ==
In 1922 Cory entered the new field of commercial radio. WJZ, a pioneering radio station, originally located in Newark, New Jersey, began broadcasting a nightly bedtime story for children told by nationally known authors such as Thornton Burgess. David Cory told a Jack Rabbit story one evening a week. His radio program ended in May 1923, when WJZ was sold and moved to New York City.

Cory also traveled across the United States and Canada telling stories to children in public schools. When storytelling on the radio, and in schools, he was known as Uncle Dave.

== Personal life ==
David Cory married Louise Elizabeth Treacy. The couple had two sons, David Monroe Cory (1903–1996) and Daniel Magie Cory (1904–1972)

The 1910 U. S. Census lists David Cory as being divorced, and he and his young sons living with Cory’s widowed mother, Ellen S. Cory, in Manhattan.

== Later life and death ==
In 1957 Cory broke a hip in a fall and gave up writing. He went to live with his son, the Rev. Dr. David M. Cory, who resided in Brooklyn. He died at home on July 4, 1966. He was buried in the family plot at Evergreen Cemetery in Elizabeth, New Jersey.

== Note ==
Newspaper articles about his syndicated newspaper stories and radio program refer to Jack Rabbit stories, but advertisements for his book series refers to them as the Little Jack Rabbit series. Therefore his book series has been given the longer title in the Bibliography.

== Bibliography ==
=== Poetry ===
- Poems (1904)
- Moods (1911)

=== Little Jack Rabbit ===
- Little Jack Rabbit’s Adventures (1921)
- Little Jack Rabbit and Danny Fox (1921)
- Little Jack Rabbit and the Squirrel Brothers (1921)
- Little Jack Rabbit and Chippy Chipmunk (1921)
- Little Jack Rabbit and the Big Brown Bear (1921)
- Little Jack Rabbit and Uncle John Hare (1922)
- Little Jack Rabbit and Professor Crow (1922)
- Little Jack Rabbit and Old Man Weasel (1923)
- Little Jack Rabbit and Mr. Wicked Wolf
- Little Jack Rabbit and Hungry Hawk
- Little Jack Rabbit and the Policeman Dog (1925)
- Little Jack Rabbit and Miss Mouse (1925)
- Little Jack Rabbit and Uncle Lucky
- Little Jack Rabbit Yellow Dog Tramp
- Little Jack Rabbit’s Favorite Bunny Tales (1926)
- Little Jack Rabbit and the Circus Elephant (1928)
- Little Jack Rabbit's Big Blue Book (1924)
- Little Jack Rabbit's Big Red Book (1924)

=== Puss-In-Boots, Jr. ===
- The Adventures of Puss-In-Boots, Jr. (1917)
- Travels of Puss-In-Boots, Jr. (1918)
- Puss-In-Boots, Jr. and Old Mother Goose (1919)
- Further Adventures of Puss-In-Boots, Jr. (1921)
- Puss-In-Boots, Jr. in Fairyland (1921)
- Puss-In-Boots, Jr. in New Mother Goose Land
- Puss-In-Boots, Jr. And the Good Gray Horse (1921)
- Puss-In-Boots, Jr. and Tom Thumb (1921)
- Puss-In-Boots, Jr. and Robinson Crusoe (1922)
- Puss-In-Boots, Jr. and the Man in the Moon (1922)

=== Billy Bunny ===
- Billy Bunny and His Friends (1917)
- Billy Bunny and Daddy Fox (1920)
- Billy Bunny and Uncle Bull Frog (1920)
- Billy Bunny and Daddy Fox
- Billy Bunny and Timmie Chipmunk (1921)
- Billy Bunny and Robbie Redbreast
- Billy Bunny and Uncle Lucky Lefthindfoot
- Billy Bunny and the Friendly Elephant (1928)

=== Little Journeys to Happyland ===
- The Cruise of the Noah’s Ark (1922)
- The Magic Soap Bubble (1922)
- The Iceberg Express (1922)
- The Wind Wagon (1923)
- The Magic Umbrella (1923)

=== Stand alone books ===
- Little People of the Garden (1914)
- Mother Nature’s Cheerful Children (1914)
- The Jumble Book: A Jumble of Good Things (1920)
- The Adventures of Young Mother Goose (1928)
- Sunny Meadows Stories (1947)

=== Little Indian ===
- Little Indian (1934)
- Red Feather (1934)
- White Otter (1934)
- Star Maiden (1935)
- Red Feather and Star Maiden (1935)
- Lone Star (1936)
- Raven Wing (1937)
- Hawk Eye (1938)
- Chippewa Trail (1939)
