= The Last Puritan =

1935 novel by George Santayana

- Cover of the first edition
- Author: George Santayana
- Language: English
- Genre: Bildungsroman
- Publication date: 1935
- Publication place: United States
- Media type: Print

The Last Puritan: A Memoir in the Form of a Novel is a 1935 novel by the Spanish-American philosopher George Santayana. Set primarily in the fictional town of Great Falls, Connecticut, it relates the life of Oliver Alden, the descendant of an old Boston family. Santayana wrote of the novel that "it gives the emotions of my experiences, and not my thoughts or experiences themselves."

Alden's life demonstrates "the essential tragedy of the late-born Puritan." In the Prologue, Santayana explains that, "in Oliver puritanism worked itself out to its logical end. He convinced himself, on puritan grounds, that it was wrong to be a puritan." The tragic aspect is that in spite of his realization he maintained the character that was his cultural bequest.

== History of the novel ==
The novel took Santayana forty-five years to complete and was a best-selling novel in 1936 (second only to Gone with the Wind). It was first published in 1935 by Constable Publishers in London. The 721 page novel was printed in Great Britain by Robert Maclehose and Co. Ltd. It was first published in the U.S. by Charles Scribner's Sons in New York. It was reprinted again in 1937 (this edition included a preface in which Santayana described the writing process and his philosophical intentions), 1940, and 1961. It was most recently published in 1994 as the fourth volume of The Works of George Santayana, a critical edition of the philosopher's writings published by MIT Press in Cambridge, Massachusetts. The MIT edition is based on the original typescript, making the content true to Santayana's original intentions. This edition also has footnotes to the text that provide the reader with historical information, commentary, and notes on editing decisions. The cover was "inspired by George Santayana's choice of the 1935 Constable edition dust jacket of The Last Puritan.

Santayana was at first hesitant about having the novel published. It contains explicit content (by the standards of the time) such as drug use, sexual deviance, atheism, etc. Considering that he was writing about many of his colleagues, he was afraid that it might be very controversial. But, as he wrote in one letter: "The dangerous sides of the book...seem to have been overlooked or timidly ignored by the critics." In writing this so-called "memoir in the form of a novel," Santayana was very concerned with its interpretation and reception. "There is no loud or obvious tragedy coming," he writes, "only a secret failure in the midst of success. But [Oliver] is a wonderful noble boy, if only I am able to make the reader see it."

== Synopsis ==
Santayana separated the book into five parts. He named the different sections of the book according to how each individual period of time matched up with Oliver Alden's life: Ancestry, Boyhood, First Pilgrimage, In The Home Orbit, and Last Pilgrimage.

=== Part I: Ancestry ===
Part I provides the necessary back story on the characters who shape Oliver's childhood and helps us understand the significance of Oliver's conflict: the conflict between Oliver's sense of duty and his “true nature”. The section begins with Nathaniel Alden, Oliver's reclusive Puritan uncle, and we are clued into his life and his philosophy. It is easy to dismiss Nathaniel as a prig, but his philosophy is practical enough and his life is in such unwavering unison with his beliefs, (a unison hard to find in many of the characters) that he serves as a good example of an early American Puritan unaffected, or just escaping, the oncoming genteel tradition. The detailed caricature of Nathaniel is significant because it shows how he affects Peter's life, which in turn, affects Oliver's. Nathaniel's problem is that his beliefs are so strong that he doesn't validate any world view except his own.

In the book A Philosophical Novelist, George Santayana says, "Nathaniel is an unwitting purveyor of Epicurean atomism to his half brother, accidentally encouraging in him a cynical tendency toward self indulgent agnosticism." Nathaniel fails to see Peter's potential; he is distracted by Peter's curiosity and favor for recreation and hanging out with "heathens." He sees Peter's actions as evil and feels a need to force change in the young boy's life. Nathaniel wants Peter to follow the will of God – prudent and tempered living with a respect for the social order of that time. When Peter began to go in a direction that he felt was unbecoming of a young man, Nathaniel tries to prove how loyal he is to God's will by sending Peter west to a camp for wayward youth.

==== Further analysis on Ancestry ====
The first section of the novel, "Ancestry", sets the tone for the rest of the story. We see the ancestral ground work for the development of Oliver's mental conflict, his dedication to duty. In section seven of Ancestry, Harriet Alden stares down on baby Oliver and describes the portraits of four generations of family, consisting of clergymen, lawyers, merchants, and physicians. It seems as if we are being predisposed to Oliver's inevitable struggle.

Oliver's relationship to duty goes back to his uncle Nathaniel Alden who seems to only do things out of a sense of duty. It is stated in the opening scene "If he [Nathaniel Alden] went out at all it was to perform some duty, such as to ascertain the state of his financial affairs." Peter is more inclined to be a free spirit and involve himself with pleasurable things. This gets him into trouble with his older sibling and is the catalyst for Peter's adventures around the world. It is also important to note how Nathaniel feels about interacting with others. He sees this as nothing more than mere gossip, and the pleasantries of conversation are nothing more than staged mechanical mannerisms. We see this when both Peter and Nathaniel attend one of the Unitarian Church services. When Nathaniel is interacting with the others, you get the distinct feeling that he only does so out of duty.

Piety is another form of duty for our dearly drab Nathaniel. He enjoys his Sunday ritual of going to church because, “if acquaintances met there they could decently ignore each other, or at most pass with a mute bow.” This confirms Nathaniel's anti-social personality, being that he rarely ever leaves his home in the first place. Even art for Nathaniel is a duty he declares for those who can afford it. He believes one ought to encourage art in a new country regardless of the quality. He possesses countless works of art which he generously donates to museums then keeps the letters of gratitude to, “refute any possible insinuation that he was a miser”, which his murdered father was accused of being. Nathaniel is undoubtedly incapable of any raw emotion and relies on his sense of duty and tradition to serve as sufficient emotional constructs. When the conundrum was proposed by Dr. Oliver Wendell Holmes, why couldn't Nathaniel Alden open the blinds or light the gas in his house, he suggests, because he might see the pictures. This cleverly states what Nathaniel truly is, a fraudulent being.

When Nathaniel decides to attend the funeral of his late cousin Sarah Quincy, it's done to maintain the consistency of their relationship. Nathaniel says, “I feel that one's conduct ought always to be consistent to the last, and that I ought to attend her funeral.” How horribly mundane. It is only because of sheer duty that he attends his cousin's funeral, devoid of any true emotional attachment. Here Nathaniel even remarks that the undertaker has the duty not to be emotionally affected by his work. He goes on to say that if he ever goes to funerals or to church it is only from the sense of duty he retains and that he does not truly enjoy them.

We see Nathaniel's attitude invade young Peter's mind frame. It is Nathaniel that feels it to be his duty to save Peter from his consorting with lower status individuals by sending him away. It is made clear however that Nathaniel is only doing this to fulfill his own sense of duty and when examined closer Peter is in no real danger of anything from which he should be extracted. It is also brought out that when Nathaniel does this it is, “one of the busier and happiest days of his life”. Could it be that Santayana is trying to tell us if we move through life only for the sake of being mobile or we stay still just to be in a state of stagnation that our soul is in danger of being in dire straits? In the spirit of Santayana one could say, that is for the reader to decide.

Everything is duty to Nathaniel and this, despite Peter's extensive traveling, is what Peter ultimately succumbs too. During Peters more mentally distressing years, when he is in his mid-thirties, we begin to see him fall into the practice of duty for duties sake. His views on marriage are a distressing prevalence of his commitment to duty. He describes his wife Harriet in a surgical way. Peter, whom his wife refers to as Dr. Alden, has a very dutiful sense of what marriage is. He says that Harriet has no sense of humor, but he doesn't care because he is only looking for peace, not companionship. He describes Harriet as “a first rate woman” and says that if he tried to fare better in finding a mate he would probably fare worse, so why not just take her. He is just like his older brother Nathaniel at this point; he is introverted, anti-social, mechanical, and cold. He does, however, respect duty, and this, for better or worse, is what he uses to validate his existence.

Harriet's motives towards marriage are not altogether dissimilar from Peter's. She feels a deep sense of duty to her father, Dr. Bumstead and to her home and property. She doesn't really want to marry Dr. Alden, but it is the most sensible thing to do, given Dr. Alden's financial status through which she intends to preserve her home and watch over her father. When asked if she would still marry Dr. Alden if she chose to move to Boston where there are a host of other men to choose from, says she would because she has a duty to preserve her family's interests.

Given that these are Oliver's parents, the reader has an excellent precursor to what Oliver's life will be like growing up in that household.

=== Part II: Boyhood ===
In Part II we journey with Oliver, a rather extraordinary child, through his early life. This section, as well as Part I, serves as a map from which we can trace many of the older Oliver's tendencies. Santayana starts at the absolute beginnings of Oliver's life, (his genetic formation in the womb) and with fantastic style describes and gives coherence to Oliver's earliest sensations and perceptions of a vast new universe. Santayana notes, at the beginning of this section, that from his first action (being born punctually and denying the "drowsy temptation" to remain female) every decision he was to make, was a decision he would make on the basis of duty. "In his infancy, Oliver is already strongly disposed to go over the line of healthy egoism – to assert too vigorously his dominion over the world that he occupies".

Indeed, it was through this assertive nature that Oliver attempted planning or structuring every event in his life – in his own way mocking chance and circumstance. But he didn't only impose his will relentlessly, he felt it his duty to do so. Duty is the inextricable force that at once propels Oliver through purposeful, practical existence, and what keeps him from ever attaining access to the more tender side of life.

This tender side of life was felt by Harriet to be a fundamental flaw if learned of too early. Peter, who generally abandoned his premonitions about his wife's mothering style, left the formal aspects of Oliver's upbringing (namely, the aspects that involved planning as opposed to physical engagement) to Harriet. She felt the emotional aspects of life and learning (religion, poetry, song) not only as unimportant to his young mind, but purely detrimental. "His education mustn't begin by stuffing him with nonsense". How significant this is in identifying the roots of Oliver's sense of duty and detachment from true emotion! The little physical contact given to the young Oliver in the capacity of emotion was to be had through Irma the German governess, although this too would prove awkward in time.

Oliver's young mind readily digested the material of fact, those indisputable fundamental principles void of human meddling and the confused passions of the lower sphere of the brain. But therein lies the problem for Oliver. His mind was digestive, not so much perceptive. Every piece of information he took in became true only when he digested it and moralized it. His perception was not weak though when he left it alone. In fact his perception, his senses, his memory, were all first rate – the problem resided in his heart. Even in as a man his heart would remain undeveloped. His early education was too one-sided, which was what Harriet thought best, and his lack of rounding out a full character would inevitably become his downfall.

His childhood was privileged, though, and the pleasures he was offered would have been the greatest joy for many a boy, if only they were offered to him as pleasures. Alas, he was forced, although not by external factors alone, to perceive everything through the lens of duty. He receives a pony, but does not ride for fun or for show, but instead out of duty to his health.

Oliver excelled at school, and was the best in most categories, but formal schooling was delayed as long as possible for Oliver had always learned on his own, and needed little guidance. The scholastic system was, in Harriet's eyes, a place for him to further his sense of duty, discipline, and the routine of social interaction. It was in school though that Oliver came to a realization that would stick with him until manhood: that there was a sunny and shady side to knowledge. The sunny side was to be found in nature, geography, mathematics, and anything left untainted by the crude passions of humanity. For him "Only non-human subjects were fit for the human mind. They alone were open, friendly and rewarding".

The section really reaches its peak with the meeting of Lord Jim on the Black Swan. Lord Jim was like a brother to Peter Alden, and for much of the section he represents a wholly admirable free-spirited side of life of which Oliver was largely unaccustomed. His friendship on that level would be very temporary as Oliver had to come to grips for possibly the first time that the person in his mind, in this case Jim, did not match up with the person as they were. This is yet another struggle in Oliver's perfectly imperfect existence.

The experience of fear when Jim dives in the water is connected to a later section of the book as a sort of premonition in Oliver's mind, and is worth keeping in mind as you progress through the novel.

=== Part III: First Pilgrimage ===
In quite compressed summary, this section takes Oliver to Europe where he will further his education, and is the section where Oliver truly begins to form his own tastes. This section also marks the decline of his and Jim's friendship, which flourished in Part II, and marks the rise of his relationship with his cousin Mario.

Part III begins with Peter Alden in London, where he felt strangely comfortable and at home, waiting for the arrival of Oliver and Irma. Peter arranged for Oliver to spend the first few days with Jim in Iffley and he sent Irma on to visit her old school. At the beginning of this section we see Peter, for the first time, worry about his sons future. He speaks of the money that will eventually belong to Oliver, and the problems it will cause him.

Jim and Oliver arrive at the Iffley Vicarage to find the family is off at the church, where Jim's father is the minister. They jolt quickly to the church to catch the rest of the sermon. Their arrival at church pleased the Vicar and caused him to change his whole sermon. This visit to the church becomes memorable because directly after the sermon Oliver meets Rose Darnley, Jim's sister, for the first time. Oliver spends some time speaking with the Vicar alone (while Rose and Jim play in the garden), and the Vicar explains that he can see a light in Oliver's eye and that he has the higher calling. He says that Oliver is a spiritual man by nature and calls this a tragic privilege.

After a meek supper Jim and Oliver leave for a two-mile hike to the King's Arms Inn. There, Mrs. Bowler, the landlady made them a large supper. One the way back to the Vicarage Jim let Oliver in on a secret of his. Mrs. Bowler and Jim had been lovers and her son, Bobby, was Jim's. This news hit Oliver like a ton of bricks, but after reflection, he realizes that it was what should have been expected.

The reader observes a steadfast and unchanging disposition towards Jim despite the shift in Oliver's perception of the reality of Jim's character. Oliver's new outlook about Jim and Mrs. Bowler are displayed through a dream that night. In the dream Oliver takes Jim and Mrs. Bowler's greed to an extreme, by insinuating that they would be willing to kill Peter or Oliver to get their money.

The next morning, when he wakes up, Oliver goes down stairs and speaks to Mrs. Darnley. It is obvious that she has lived a difficult life and Oliver feels pity for her. Despite his recent feelings Oliver had towards Jim, he focused on Jim's positive qualities, with the purpose of pleasing her. Later that day Jim and Oliver went to the inn for a luncheon (which Oliver would pay for). Oliver comforted Bobby after dropping his fruit in the mud and he doctored up his bruised leg. Bobby clung to Oliver's coat and stated that he didn't want to leave, because he likes Oliver more than his family. Oliver than encountered Rose, he found himself interested in how her mind worked. She was young and her mind was not yet mature. Her mind still thought in categories and didn't believe in the necessity of a reason for something; she just believed that things simply were the way that they were. This attracted Oliver and at the end of their conversation he asked the young girl to marry him. Rose accepted this proposal and he kissed her. He wanted to run and tell Jim that they would be married, but she said no one would believe it because Oliver, himself, didn't believe it. They decided to keep it a secret until the day that they can prove it true.

Oliver took his first punting lesson while travelling back to Iffley. He learned the task rather easily, like all physically dependent tasks. The action of the body seemed to restore a sense of homeostasis to his mind. "Thought is never sure of its contacts with reality; action must intervene to render the rhetoric of thought harmless and its emotions sane." [This idea is recurring in the novel. He uses bodily action to remain in contact with reality via football, rowing, and running. As he gets older he exercises less and uses his body less, thus causing pain in his thoughts and an irrational emotional state (attributing too much control to himself over the world).] Peter decides to take Oliver to see his foreign cousin at Eton, an English public school. This is when we first encounter Oliver's cousin, Mario. Mario is younger than Oliver, but he was at least his intellectual equal, perhaps even his superior. He carried on a full conversation with Peter, and Oliver listened. Despite the lack of conversation between the two boys they each felt the presence of the other. Oliver and Mario seemed, from the beginning, to be direct opposites. "[Mario] is the anti-puritan, the foil to Oliver; his destiny on earth is happiness, and the world, Santayana believes, is better off for him and his kind.

At lunch the next day they all three sat and conversed until Peter began to cough and grow pale. Peter decided to stay in and rest next to a fire while Mario showed Oliver the sights. They decided to walk and talk rather than see the sights. Peter was dreading the walk down Castle Hill, but he didn't want to disappoint Mario so he decided he would dose himself with medicine before the trip. When the boys returned they got a visit from Mr Rawdon Smith, Mario's schoolmaster. They spoke of a multitude of things, but the most important topic was of Mario's staying at Eton. Mario wanted to stay there so he could see his mother on the holidays. As Mr Rawdon Smith continued to speak Peter slipped into a limp slumber in the arm chair, with his eyes closed. Mr Rawdon Smith went to shake him until he encountered Oliver's deliberately rough arm-nudge. Oliver knew that Peter had a chill and must have medicated himself with a sedative, and he also knew that the sedative had taken him over. Oliver coaxed Peter into assisting in moving him to the cab and the three of them went to a see a doctor that Mario knew.

The Doctor's name was Mr. Morrison-Ely, he wasn't referred to as doctor. He advised them against travelling for a few days. Oliver decided he would go back to London, pay the bill, and bring his father his old slippers and razors. Mario decided to go with him, and Oliver gave him the task of paying for everything with his money since the money was foreign to him and he knew it would make Oliver feel as though he helped his elder cousin.

Peter's health was declining. Due to his current heart issues they decided to move him to a more peaceful spot. Peter was on bed-rest and had Mildred to wait on him. This is the time that Oliver and Peter spend the most father-son time together. The two finally connect and had time to talk and exchange philosophic inquiries and viewpoints.

Oliver was thinking of the upcoming school year when he received a cablegram from his mother demanding that he bring his father home immediately, or else she would come and get him. This upset Peter, he didn't understand why Oliver wrote to his mother to explain the situation. This ruined everything, because he was unable to move he had no options. He had Oliver write a letter to his mother, stating that he was better and that Oliver was sailing home. He made his preparations and then just had to close his eyes and die.

Oliver meets up with his mother, who exclaims that everything is wrong, just like Peter predicted. Mrs. Alden is having difficulty dealing with the fact that she was in a strange land, her husband is dead, and her son is going off to college.

Mrs. Alden found a letter among Peter's business papers. The letter was from Mario wishing Peter to get well, it also thanked Peter for paying for his schooling. The letter also spoke of Oliver and the interest the two showed in each other foreshadowed their future involvement in each other's lives. Mrs. Alden was no longer a match for Oliver. Any position she may take would be beaten down by the young puritan. She bounced from one automatically elicited thought to the next and Oliver understood the irrationality in his mother. This is the point where Oliver and his mother really break apart. "His allegiance in any case must be to his own conscience, to his own reason. On that basis he was not in the least afraid of the future-fool's paradise or virtuous hell, or whatever you might call it."

On the ship back to America Oliver finds some time to escape from his mother and spend some time alone. He re-reads Mario's letter and begins to ponder on the people who think so highly of him. He feels as though his mother doesn't love him and he thinks that she won't let anyone else love him either; but he convinces himself that the relationship he and Mario have can only be explained by love. After reaching this realization he is about to go back to his mother, when out of nowhere, a hand grabbed his shoulder. It was Jim Darnley. He wandered how and why Jim was here. It was clear that he had travelled many miles without sleep to come to the ship that he knew Oliver would be on. It was as though Jim felt if Oliver got away to America he would never see him, or more importantly, his money again. Jim sneaked on board without a ticket, but he knew the Bursar and was allowed to work off his passage. Lucky for Jim, there happened to be a large, double cabin that was open and had been paid for by an unknown source.

Oliver understands Jim's reliance on him, but he knew that he should not avoid him. Jim's appearance transformed overnight. He was now clean, shaven, and well-dressed. Jim wanted to spend some time with Oliver like the old days, but Oliver knew he couldn't be around Jim on this trip. His mother would be uproarious if she found out that Jim was on the ship at all. Jim offered Oliver some of his father's books and keep-sakes from the "Black Swan." Jim tells Oliver of his newly planned life. He is to marry a new girl name Bella Iggins, and they plan on acting to pay the bills until he gets his money for the ship and they can settle at a riverside cottage. Oliver knew better than to believe in Jim's plan, he doubted he would get married, but was sure he would be divorced soon afterward if he did follow through with the plan.

The rest of the trip he hardly saw Jim Darnley. He felt as though Jim was afraid that he would forget him, but Oliver was ever too loyal to turn his back on a promise. "Jim is to be the Goethen good intentions." He knew that, despite what he now understood about Jim's, selfish character, he would not be the same person without him. Oliver understands that the effect that Jim had on him was over. Now he was merely attached to him through a sense of duty, which is how he feels he is attached to everything through this same sense of relentless duty. At the end of this section we get a peek inside Jim's head. When he speaks of his marriage he doesn't speak of love and commitment, he speaks of how he will ask Oliver to be his best man (even though he knows Oliver will be too busy and won't be able to come), for the purpose of getting a big wedding gift. He thinks about how Bobby, Rose, and his future children will all be taken care of by the soundest Puritan he had ever known, Oliver Alden.

=== Part V: Last Pilgrimage ===
The first part of The Last Pilgrimage recalls Oliver's journey around the world with Mario, which had turned out to be a disappointment for Oliver. Like his father, Oliver could not find peace anywhere in his travels. So, Oliver returns to Oxford and decides to ultimately return to America.

The next part occurs in 1914 at the start of World War I. Mario visits Oliver to inform him that he is going to fight with the French. Oliver protests this decision, and argues that war is foolish, but Mario proceeds to tell Oliver that he doesn't understand such things and joins anyway. Oliver then returns to Iffley to discover that Jim Darnley has been killed.

In the third part we witness Oliver in a touching moment comforting Jim Darnley's mother, but he is only able to do so because he mimics Jim. Oliver again proves his goodness by proposing to adopt Jim Darnley's bastard son, but Jim's sister Rose crushes this proposal. All they really need is Oliver's money, and Rose says that Oliver wouldn't be capable of raising the boy in any other manner.

Following these events Oliver decides to volunteer as an ambulance driver in France, but is unable to handle the stress. He realizes that "his soul has been born crippled." So, he returns discouraged to Iffley. Following the advice of Mrs. Darnley, he opens a home for convalescent officers at Court Place, which places his wealth, as always, at the center of his relationships. By this time, America had entered the war. Oliver, driven as always by duty, returned to America to enlist to fight for America (despite his earlier belief that the war was wrong).

Santayana begins to mention more and more Oliver's psychological issues. Upon joining the army, Oliver ignores his personal problems, and "he threw off this 'depression' as again they called it." He also realizes the correlations between football and the military.

He visits his mother for what would be the last time, and Irma is horrified that he is going to war against her own country. His mother becomes a devout patriot and Irma eventually leaves the Alden household. Mrs. Alden's former lover and close friend, Letitia Lamb, takes Irma's place.

During this time, Mario is wounded and stays with the Darnley women on Oliver's behalf. Rose develops a crush for Mario.

The fifth part again portrays Oliver as depressed and unable to cope with war. He was no longer a capable officer and "the authorities were "annoyed at his frequent illnesses." He is sent away for recuperation to Paris. Then enters a prostitute and old "friend" of Mario's looking for money, whom Oliver pities and gives 1000 francs. She then attempts to seduce him, but he realizes that he is incapable of making love to a woman, a realization brought on by him tasting her sardine breath. The fact that Oliver was offended at this is secondary to the idea that the smell and lustful embrace served to pull his head from the clouds, and to bring before his face the true nature of the woman whom he had seen, as little as five minutes prior, drop the masque and embody the very symbol of the meek; while he took on that of the man of ample piety.

Part six tells of Oliver returning to duty sick and depressed. He was "thin, sallow, and tired" and "he couldn't sleep well at night, and seemed to be half asleep and dreaming all day." His commanding officers realize that his depression has made him unfit for service, and send him to a nursing home. While there he realizes that he is not free, and makes the decision to marry. Recall that Peter's life was wrought by similar circumstances, but realized a different outcome.

In part seven he returns to Iffley to propose to Rose Darnley, and in doing so finds out that Mr. Darnley has died. He proposes to Rose but is turned down.

In the following episode, Oliver realizes that he probably won't marry. The only thing that might make him happy "must be all perfection and all beauties and all happiness."

In the conclusion of The Last Puritan, we found out that Oliver returned to his military service but was killed in a vehicle crash. This part tells us of Mario returning to Iffley to speak with the Mrs. Darnley and Rose. Apparently, his old friend Tom Piper had become a doctor in the military, and upon seeing Oliver had died was terribly sad (something which affirms that Tom was Oliver's true friend in this story). Mario cannot help but notice how unappreciative the Darnley's were of Oliver, despite all that Oliver had done for them. Mario himself is terribly distressed.

The tale ends with the reader realizing that Mario had matured, when he realizes that Rose had a crush on him. He thinks about "taming the shrew," but after playing with the idea realizes that he's past such meanderings. He becomes a moral creature through natural self-knowledge.

The Darnley's remain crude and disrespectful of Oliver. Rose begins to weep (probably in Mario refusing her) and Mrs. Darnley assumes that she is mourning Oliver. "No need breaking your heart over a young man who's dead and gone," she remarks to Rose. But, she admits, he was a kind gentleman.

== Characters ==
1. Mr. Nathaniel Alden is Oliver's Uncle and a man of solitary Puritanism. He has a strong sense of duty and incorporates it into his life on a daily basis. At first glance, he appears like the basic, rich snob of his era. But upon further inspection, it is realized that Nathaniel Alden doesn't participate in anything unless duty compels him to do so. At the beginning of the book, his first concern, or duty, is to take care of his younger brother's finances until he comes of age. His second duty is to instill in his brother the principles of duty and social order.
2. Dr. Peter Alden is Nathaniel's younger brother and Oliver's Father. Peter begins as a character who is primarily concerned with entertainment and the exploration of the world around him. This leads to a falling out with Nathaniel, which in turn, leads to Peter being sent to a boarding school where he accidentally kills a night guard during a prank. Peter is forced into exile and begins a long journey that reshapes his character. He travels the world looking for peace, but finds none. He studies medicine abroad and begins to experiment with drugs. He becomes confused, and internally conflicted, leaving him to seek help from a psychiatrist. After moving onto his psychiatrist's estate, Peter eventually marries the psychiatrist's daughter. They produce one child, Oliver. Afterwards, Peter becomes more conflicted and prefers to stay on his yacht on the sea. He continues to abuse drugs, and eventually takes his own life.
3. Miss. Harriet Bumstead/ Mrs. Harriet Alden is Peter's wife and Oliver's mother. She has an extremely high opinion of herself and religiously shows it. She pushes Oliver into sports and other engagements in an effort to keep him focused on duty. She doesn't want take care of Oliver while he is a child so she hires Irma Schlote to be his caretaker. Mrs. Alden never seems to care for Oliver outside his social standing, believing his actions are a reflection on her.
4. Letitia Lamb is Harriet Bumstead's friend. She lives in a women's boarding house and likes to collect art. She appears to be very kind and fond of Oliver. She eventually takes over the job that Irma Schlote left towards the end of her and Mrs. Alden's lives.
5. Oliver Alden is the protagonist. Oliver is the son of Peter and Harriet Alden and is born into money. He starts his life experimenting and learning, and quickly develops a sense of duty. Although Oliver determines that he hates doing a great many things, football for example, he does them anyway because he feels it is his duty. His sense of duty often conflicts with his desires and a reasonable course of action derived from his experiences. He understands that Puritanism, chiefly characterized by his sense of duty, moral absolutism, and idealism, is self-destructive and conclusively leads to its own dismissal, yet he continues his allegiance duty because it is the core of his value system. Oliver enters World War I and becomes sick during his tour. He eventually feels that he is nearing the end of his life and proposes to his adolescent love, Rose. Oliver, a consistent failure at physical love and romantic relationships, is denied. Oliver is tragically killed in a car accident as he dodges a motorbike in the road. Oliver's devotion to Puritanism up to the point of its paradoxical conclusion warrants Santayana's description of Oliver as the Last Puritan.
6. Irma Schlote is a German who was brought into the Alden household to be a governess. She was discovered by Mrs. Alden's younger brother, Harry Bumstead, and brought into the house on a six-month trial run. Mrs. Alden was initially suspicious of her because of her German background, but upon her arrival she immediately loved her. She was the perfect housekeeper, one who had similar ideals and yet knew her place in Mrs. Alden's home. She took great care of Oliver during his early years. Later, as the War progressed, Irma Schlote became disillusioned with Mrs. Alden and her anti-German ideals and promptly left her.
7. Jim Darnley is the captain that Peter Alden hire to take care of his yacht. He is called "Lord Jim" by Peter and Oliver Alden. He becomes almost a second son to Peter Alden, and a brother to Oliver. Jim later has a sort of falling out with Oliver after Peter Alden's death and ends up dying in World War I as a sailor in the navy.
8. Cousin Caleb Wetherbee is described by Peter as "a hunchback, and a cripple, an enthusiast who has gone over to Rome and built a Benedictine Monastery at Salem in his old family orchard".
9. Mario "Vanny" Van de Weyer is Oliver Alden's cousin. He is referenced as the American who has never really been in America. Santayana stated in a later work that Mario is the character he wishes he were in life. Mario is very outgoing and well traveled, not to mention good with the ladies. He becomes best friends with Oliver and later as he goes to college, Oliver attempts to take care of Mario. But with the exception of Oliver's money, Mario can take care of himself. Mario eventually enters into World War I before Oliver and writes to Oliver frequently of it. He ends up injuring himself twice during the war. After the war he lives in Paris and becomes friends with the author of the memoir (presumably Santayana himself as he creates himself in the book). Mario is the one that urges the author to write the memoir.
10. Caroline Van de Weyer is Peter and Nathaniel Alden's half-sister. She is disliked by Nathaniel, even though she offers to take care of her younger brother Peter for him. She is married to Erasmus Van de Weyer and is the mother of Mario Van de Weyer.
11. Edith Van de Weyer is also Oliver's cousin. She is introduced through Mario to Oliver. Oliver eventually starts to fall for her and feels a duty to court her. Unfortunately she becomes engaged to Reverend Edgar Thornton and turns down Oliver.
12. Rose Darnley is the daughter of Mrs. Darnley. She meets Oliver on his first pilgrimage to England. As Oliver and Rose's friendship became stronger, Oliver proposed to her in a half-joking manner. Towards the end of Oliver's life, he comes back to try and actually marry Rose, but is turned down by her. She told Oliver that they were too much alike to marry each other.

== Symbolism and a summary of Santayana's implications ==
Many readers and critics have been curious as to just how much Santayana's own life and views are demonstrated through the novel's characters. In one of the author's letters, of which there is an astounding collection, Santayana claimed the novel gave "the emotions of my experience, and not my thoughts or experiences themselves." This is vital in understanding the nature of a novel which, to an extent, lends itself quite easily to misunderstandings and criticisms. Indeed, some of the confusion stems from the subtitle A Memoir in the Form of a Novel, which may lead one to believe that Oliver alone is the fictional representation of Santayana.

== A memoir in the form of a novel ==
The book is titled as a memoir because, as philosopher Horace M. Kallen wrote, Santayana's “true image” is better seen in The Last Puritan than in his autobiography, Persons and Places. And the novel is “far more authentic than the autobiographical books, partly because he assumes that it’s disguised."

The Last Puritan embodies all the elements of literary psychology. Santayana was able to intertwine his philosophy with a narrative in a seamless and natural composition. In 1921, Santayana said his book would, “contain all I know about America, about women, and young men. As this last is rather my strong point, I have two heroes, the Puritan and another not too much the other way. To make up, I have no heroine, but a worldly grandmother, a mother- the quintessence of all New England virtues- and various fashionable, High Church, emancipated, European, and sentimental young ladies. I have also a German governess- in love with the hero- of whom I am very proud.”

Both of these quotes tell us a great deal about the philosophical nature of this novel. Yes, it tells a beautiful story about youth and loss, but it also projects Santayana's deeper philosophies about himself, America, the genteel tradition, and the importance of a personal philosophy. In each of the characters the reader can find elements of the author and elements of his philosophy, primarily as it relates to his critique of America.

The story takes place in Boston where Santayana was raised. Oliver and Peter attend “public” schools, now referred to as private schools, just as Santayana did. Peter's attempt to find meaning outside of his native country mirrors Santayana's decision to become an expatriate. Mario's Italian heritage can be linked to Santayana's Italian residence, along with their shared southern European heritage. Nathaniel Alden exemplifies the mentality and traditions of Old Europe, the place of Santayana's ancestry. A son of Spanish Catholics growing up in Protestant Boston, Santayana thought of himself as a “stranger”. The chief dilemma of Oliver Alden is that he is a stranger to himself, unable to be honest with himself about what he wants and why he believes what he does.

The story is a tragedy. The subtitle for the German edition is Die Geschichte eines tragischen Lebens (the story of a tragic life). The tragedy depicted in the novel is what Santayana saw as the tragedy of American culture—Puritanism and the genteel tradition. Santayana said this book contained all he knew about America: New England virtues, the High Church, Puritanism, and German influences.

All these things are essential for understanding what the genteel tradition is and why it is a tragedy. According to Santayana, the genteel tradition is a disconnect between tradition and practice, what Americans profess and how they act. Identifiable elements include: moral absolutism, an ego-driven perception of the universe, Calvinism (in the broadest sense of the word), transcendentalism, and “thinking disassociated from experience.” The elements of this tradition do not support the business-minded, scientific, materialistic, will-driven way in which Americans act. The result is internal conflict that causes many Americans to fail to live up to their potential and to question their happiness, worth, and life's meaning.

The characters in The Last Puritan embody elements of the genteel tradition. Nathaniel is business-minded and is committed to societal order without questioning its validity. Peter can't find peace because his experiences around the world are in conflict with what he feels, as an American and an Alden, he ought to do. Oliver's mother makes up rules without reason, or acts without a tradition or experience to warrant the action. Mario is an example of what life without the genteel tradition is like. He knows himself, makes decisions based on experience, and is interested in the experiences of others, avoiding the trap of egotism. Oliver, on the other hand, most exemplifies the tragedy of the genteel tradition through his Puritanism developed fully to its tragic, self-destructive end.

"Here says Santayana, is the tragedy of the Puritan: the spirit that seeks to govern and is not content to understand, that rebels against nature and animal faith and demands some absolute sanction for love. But the tragedy of Oliver was deeper than this. Your true puritans, who through faith subdued kingdoms, wrought righteousness, stopped the mouths of lions, were men and women of ardors, even gaiety. Oliver was the child of a dead faith, of a marriage without love and a home without laughter. And so he could neither believe in any cause nor laugh at himself nor forget himself in love. Santayana has portrayed not the tragedy but the DEATH of puritanism."

Perhaps Santayana was too occupied with describing the genteel tradition to make clear that both it and practical America are at fault in denying to the individual the freedom of spirit and thought...although Oliver should have been a saint, but he lived in a spiritual vacuum, which was not conductive to spiritual growth.

== Santayana's Spirit in The Last Puritan ==
Santayana describes Oliver as a spiritual person, and according to Santayana's ontology the "spirit is a natural observer." The trouble with Oliver is that he only knew how to "observe"; he was trapped in some sort of mystical transcendentalism inherited from his parents. At the same time, he felt obliged to follow through with the hollow duties assigned to him by his society. "It was Oliver, not I, who didn't love life, because he hadn't the animal Epicurean faculty of enjoying it in its arbitrariness and transciency...he had nothing to pin his [spiritual] allegiance to..." Santayana presents that the quiet tragedy of Oliver is caused by his lack of self-knowledge, the absence of a "guide to life," and the influences of a confused society. "It is the body that speaks, and the spirit that listens," writes Santayana. "Honest attention to our streams of consciousness attests to the fact that spirit is not the self but an observer of the self." Santayana identifies the quest for the good life with that of self-knowledge. But, Oliver instead tried to control his existence entirely with his spirit, and at the same time he never really knew himself, never realized where his spirit was coming from. At least, until it was too late. He repeatedly observed that his spirit was trapped at the roots, entangled, but he never quite knew why. Santayana's writes that "when spirit, in attending to the essences before it, confuses those essences with itself, it misconstrues its own nature, for 'spirit' is not a reality that can be observed; it does not figure among the dramatis personae of the play it witnesses." Wahman continues that "Spirit is always a subject, as such it can never be the immanent object of that which it observes, much less the transcendent object to which the interior datum refers."

"Oliver Alden's approach to the death prophesied by Mr. Denis Murphy stiffens the fabric of his personality, hardening to a tragic rigidity his divided allegiance, the rift of body and spirit. Death's approach also make him take on a life of his own- a life in which his author seems to have little part. In an extraordinary act of artistic self-sacrifice, of negative capability, Santayana sets Oliver free to achieve his own destiny on his own terms and allows us as readers, especially those of us who are American, to experience the pity and terror of contemplating a young man caught in our own spiritual predicament, who goes to his death with the predicament unresolved."
