= John Lachs =

American philosopher (1934–2023)

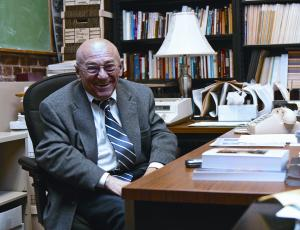
- Born: July 17, 1934; Budapest, Kingdom of Hungary
- Died: November 14, 2023 (aged 89); Nashville, Tennessee, U.S.

Education
- Doctoral advisor: Brand Blanshard; Wilfrid Sellars

Philosophical work
- Era: Contemporary philosophy
- Region: Western philosophy
- School: Continental philosophy
- Doctoral students: Tom Rockmore
- Main interests: Human nature; ethics; metaphysics; philosophy of mind; pragmatism; German idealism; political philosophy; American philosophy
- Notable ideas: Stoic pragmatism

John Lachs (July 17, 1934 – November 14, 2023) was a Hungarian-born American philosopher. He was Centennial Professor of Philosophy at Vanderbilt University, where he began teaching in 1967.

Lachs received his Ph.D. from Yale University in 1961. His primary focus was on American philosophy (most prominently George Santayana) and German Idealism.

== Biography ==
John Lachs was born in Budapest on July 17, 1934. He emigrated to Canada as a child, and he received his B.A. and M.A. from McGill University in 1956 and 1957. At Yale University, he wrote a dissertation on the philosophy of George Santayana, graduating in 1961. He began his career at the College of William and Mary where in 1962 he was given the PBK award for distinguished teaching and scholarship. He was a member of the Vanderbilt University faculty from 1967 until his death and wrote a number of books and many articles over this period and before. In 1997 he served as president of the Metaphysical Society of America. He was recognized as an outstanding teacher among Vanderbilt faculty, receiving the Graduate Teaching Award in 2000, the Outstanding Commitment to Teaching Freshmen Award in 1999, and the Madison Sarratt Prize for Excellence in Undergraduate Teaching in 1972.

Lachs tried to make his writing style highly accessible, for he was committed to making philosophical questions and their discussion come within the grasp of all his audiences. A pragmatist in the tradition of William James and Josiah Royce, he was a longstanding member of the William James Society and became its president in 2007.

A self-identified libertarian, Lachs was the Vanderbilt faculty adviser of Young Americans for Liberty. Among the prominent alumni whose Ph.D. dissertations he advised are many of the leading figures in bioethics, pragmatism, and a number of public intellectuals, including Glenn McGee, Paul Menzel, and Herman Saatkamp. On April 3, 2013, he became one of three professors in Vanderbilt's history to receive the prestigious Alumni Education Award twice.

For many years Lachs was also a member of the editorial advisory board for Public Philosophy Journal.

Lachs died in Nashville, Tennessee, on November 14, 2023, at the age of 89.

== Research area ==
His philosophical interests centred around human nature. This took him into metaphysics, philosophy of mind, political philosophy, and ethics. He had continuing research interests in American philosophy and German Idealism, along with research and teaching interests in medical and business ethics.

Lachs was the general editor of the Encyclopedia of American Philosophy. An issue of The Journal of Speculative Philosophy was devoted to his essay "Both Better Off and Better: Moral Progress Amid Continuing Carnage," with responses from a half dozen philosophers.

Lachs was also chair of the American Philosophical Association's Centennial Committee, charged with celebrating the private value and social usefulness of philosophy. Plans were being made for activities throughout the country, ranging from radio programs to book signings and coffee house conversations, designed to show the relevance of philosophy to life.

== Publications ==
A recipient of the Herbert Schneider Award for Lifetime Contributions to American Philosophy in 1997, Lachs is also the author of the following books, among others:

- Intermediate Man. Hackett Publishers, Indianapolis, 1981, paperback 1983.
- Mind and Philosophers. Vanderbilt University Press, 1987.
- The Relevance of Philosophy to Life, Vanderbilt University Press, 1995.
- In Love with Life, Vanderbilt University Press, 1998.
- Thinking in the Ruins: Wittgenstein and Santayana. Vanderbilt University Press, 2000.
- A Community of Individuals. Routledge, 2003.
- The Philosophy of William Ernest Hocking (ed. with Micah Hester), Vanderbilt University Press 2001.
- "Human Natures," Proceedings of the American Philosophical Association, 1990.
- "Stoic Pragmatism", Indiana University Press, 2012.
- Meddling: On the Virtue of Leaving Others Alone, Indiana University Press, 2014.
