= Tony Award for Best Featured Actress in a Play =

American theatre award for Broadway actresses

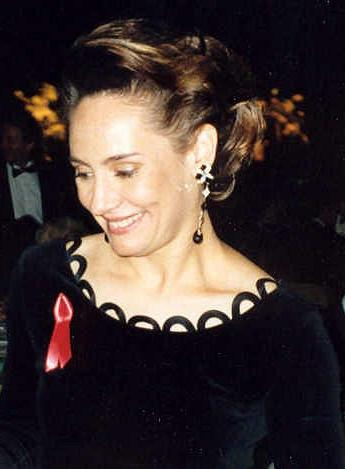
- 2026 recipient: Laurie Metcalf
- Description: Best Performance by a Featured Actress in a Play
- Location: United States New York City
- Presented by: American Theatre Wing, The Broadway League
- Currently held by: Laurie Metcalf for Death of a Salesman (2026)
- Website: TonyAwards.com

The Tony Award for Best Featured Actress in a Play is an honor presented at the Tony Awards, a ceremony established in 1947 as the Antoinette Perry Awards for Excellence in Theatre, to actresses for quality supporting roles in a Broadway play. The awards are named after Antoinette Perry, an American actress who died in 1946. Honors in several categories are presented at the ceremony annually by the Tony Award Productions, a joint venture of The Broadway League and the American Theatre Wing, to "honor the best performances and stage productions of the previous year."

The award was originally called the Tony Award for Actress, Supporting or Featured (Dramatic). Patricia Neal won the first such award for her portrayal of Regina Hubbard in Lillian Hellman's Another Part of the Forest. Before 1956, nominees' names were not made public: the change was made by the awards committee to "have a greater impact on theatregoers". The award was renamed in 1976, when Shirley Knight became the first winner under the new title for her role as Carla in Robert Patrick's Kennedy's Children. Its most recent recipient is Laurie Metcalf, for the role of Linda Loman, in Death of a Salesman.

Eight actresses (Christine Baranski, Judith Ivey, Judith Light, Swoosie Kurtz, Audra McDonald, Laurie Metcalf, Frances Sternhagen, and Kara Young) hold the record for most awards in this category, each with two total. Portrayals of Ruth Younger in A Raisin in the Sun, Mavis Parodus Bryson in The Sign in Sidney Brustein's Window, and Linda Loman in Death of a Salesman have won twice.

== Winners and nominees ==
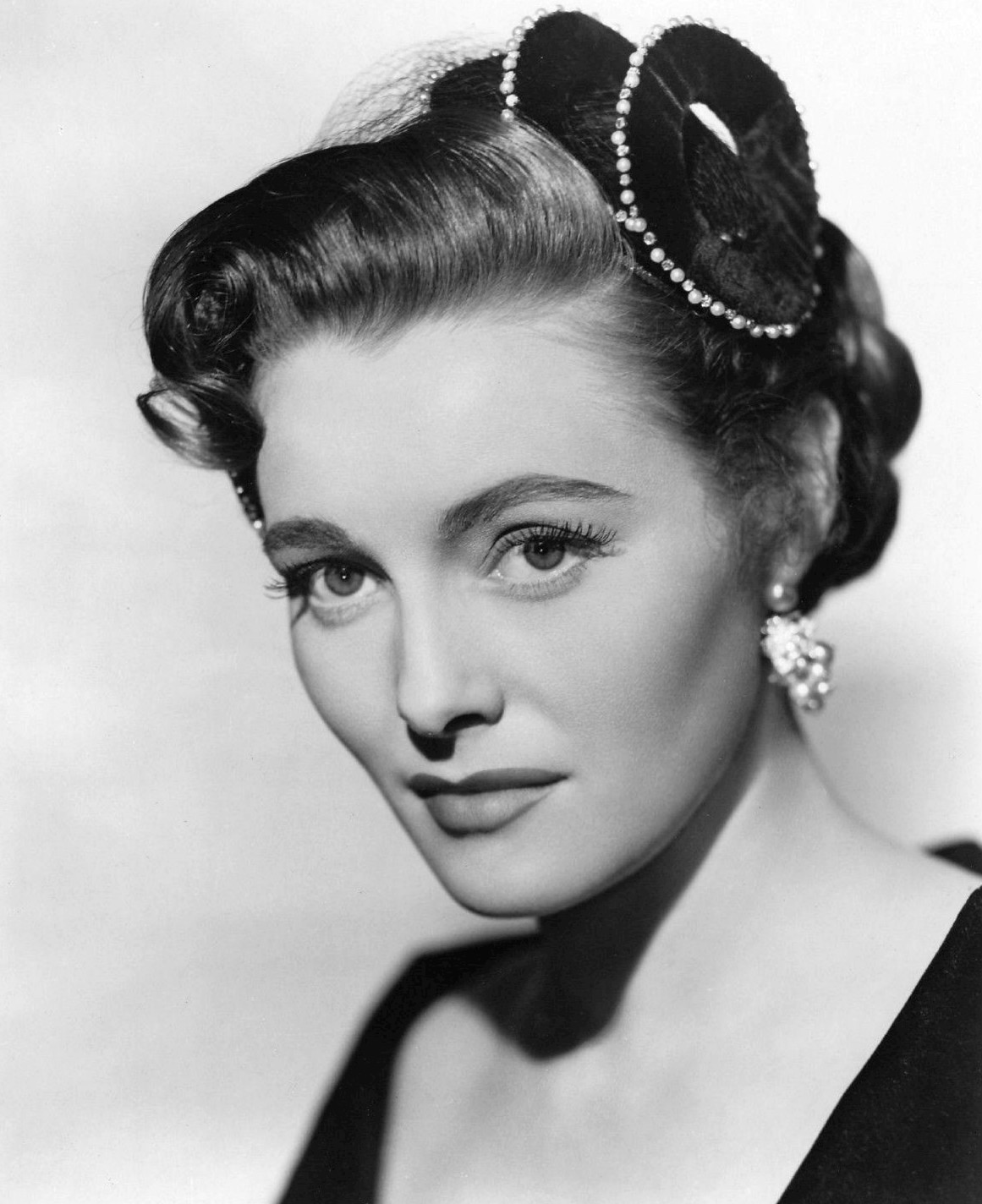
1947 award winner Patricia Neal

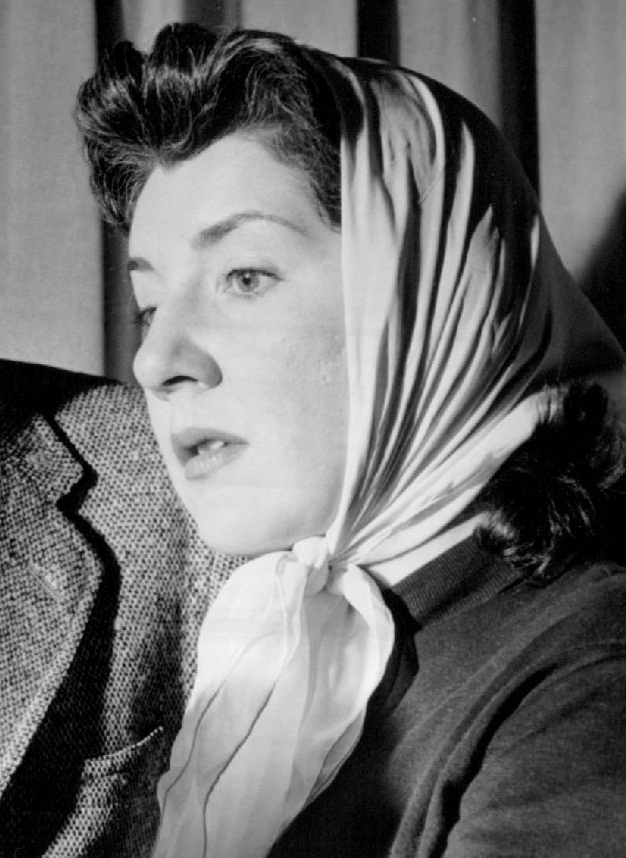
Maureen Stapleton won for The Rose Tattoo (1951)

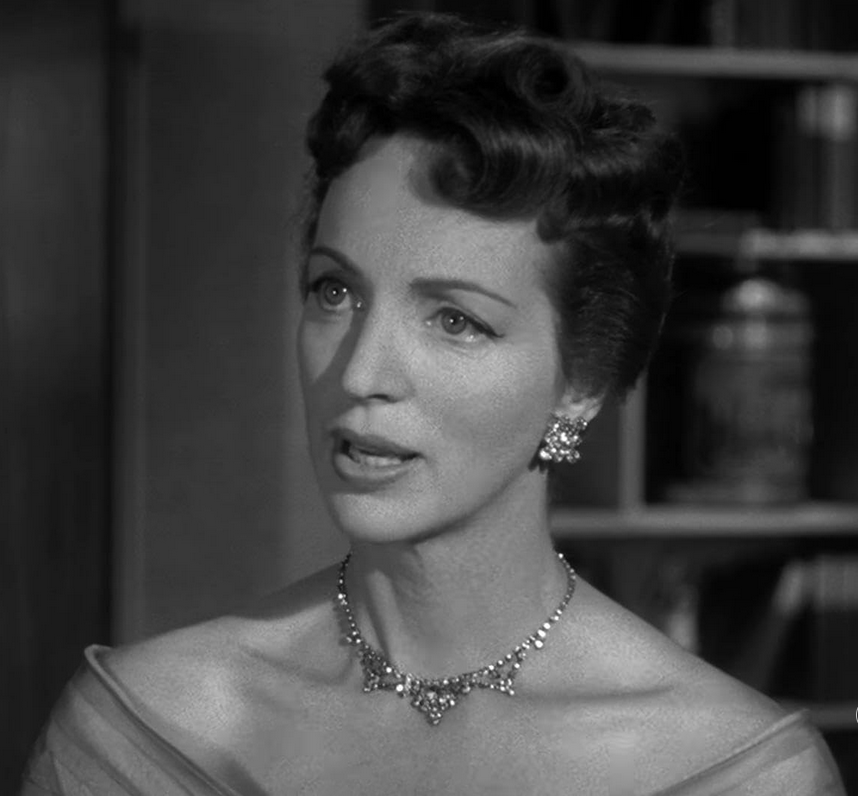
Beatrice Straight won for The Crucible (1953)

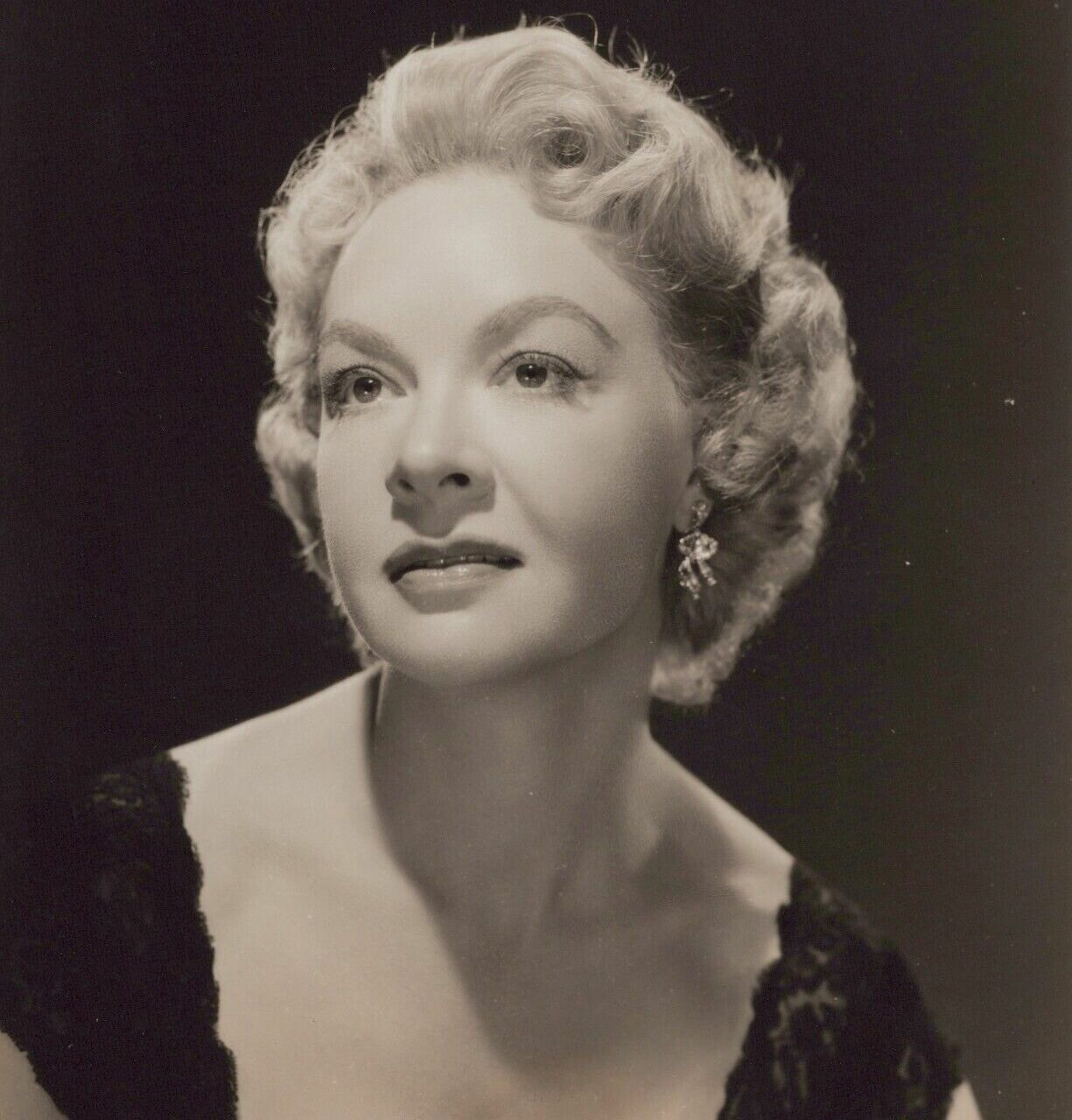
Jo Van Fleet won for The Trip to Bountiful (1954)

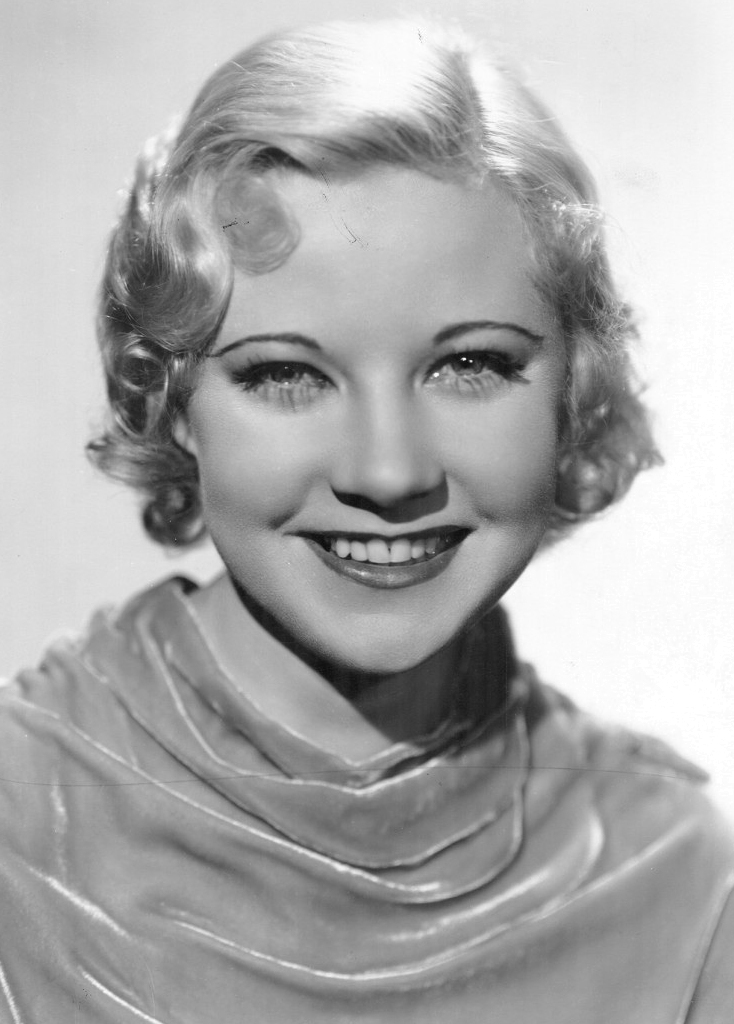
Una Merkel won for The Ponder Heart (1956)

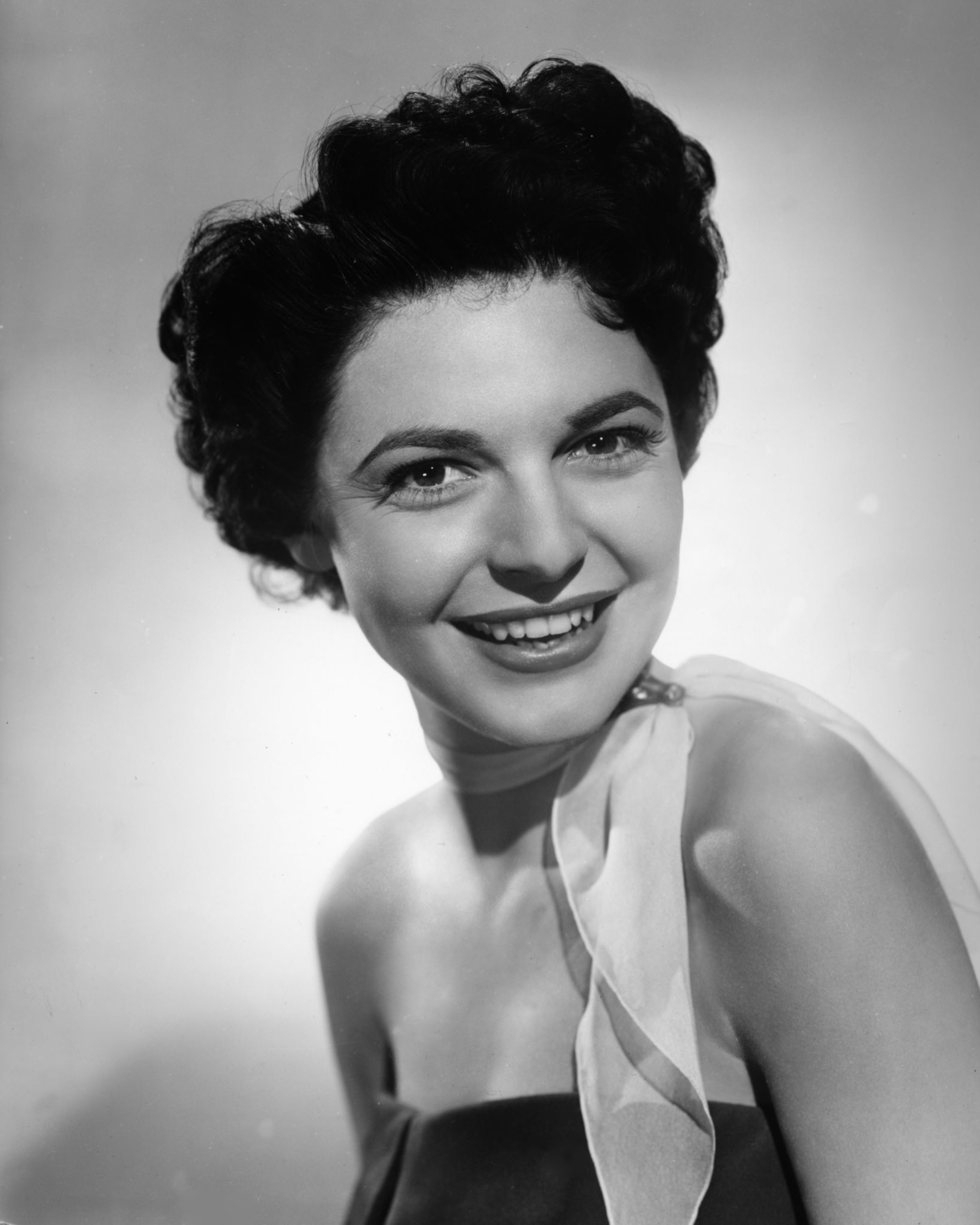
1958 award winner Anne Bancroft

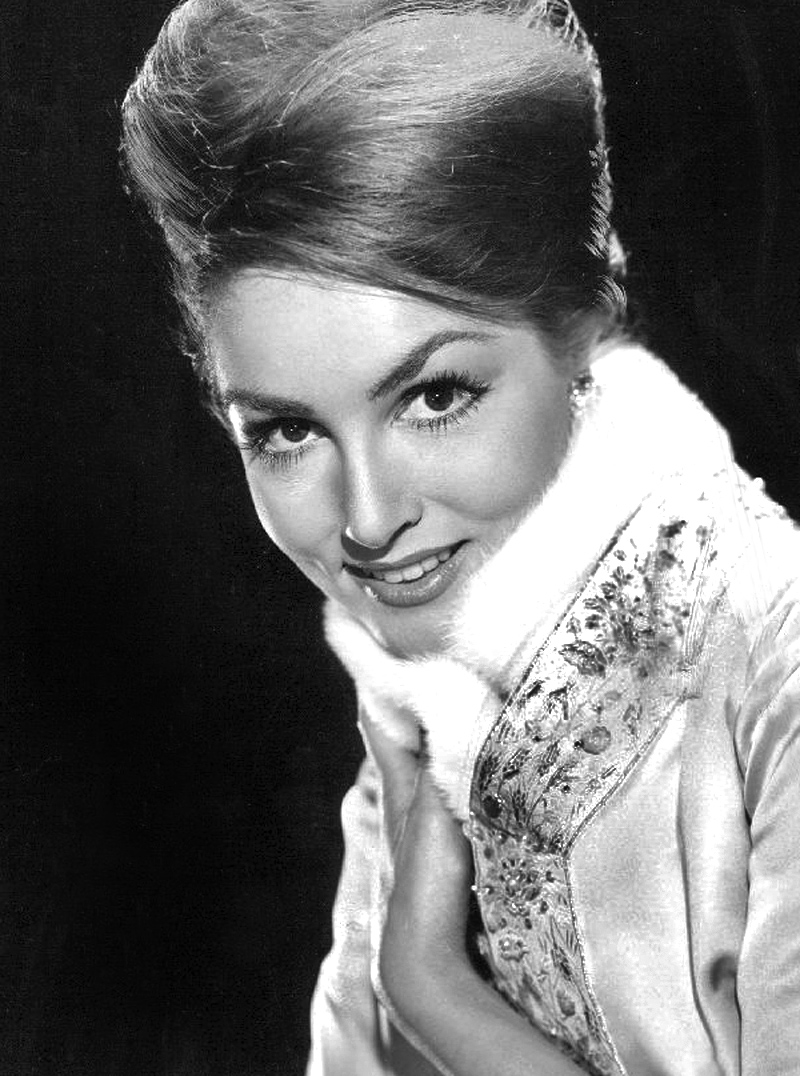
Julie Newmar won for The Marriage-Go-Round (1959)

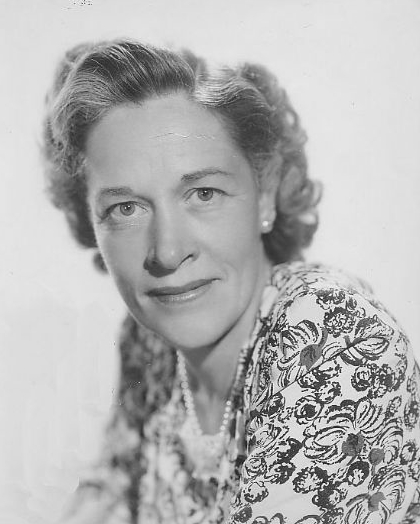
Anne Revere won for Toys in the Attic (1960)

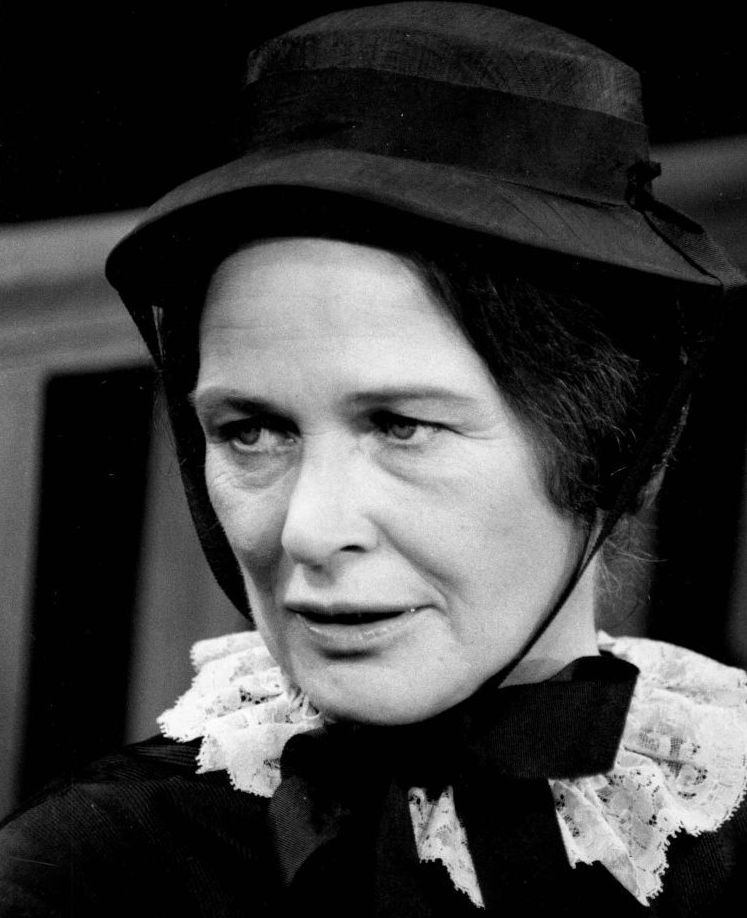
Colleen Dewhurst won for All the Way Home (1961)

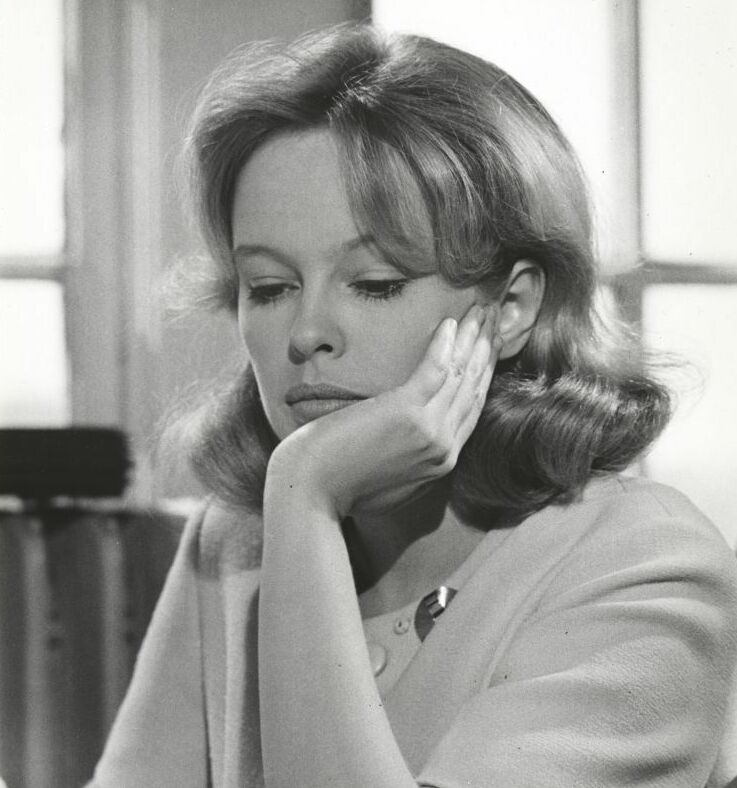
Sandy Dennis won for A Thousand Clowns (1963)

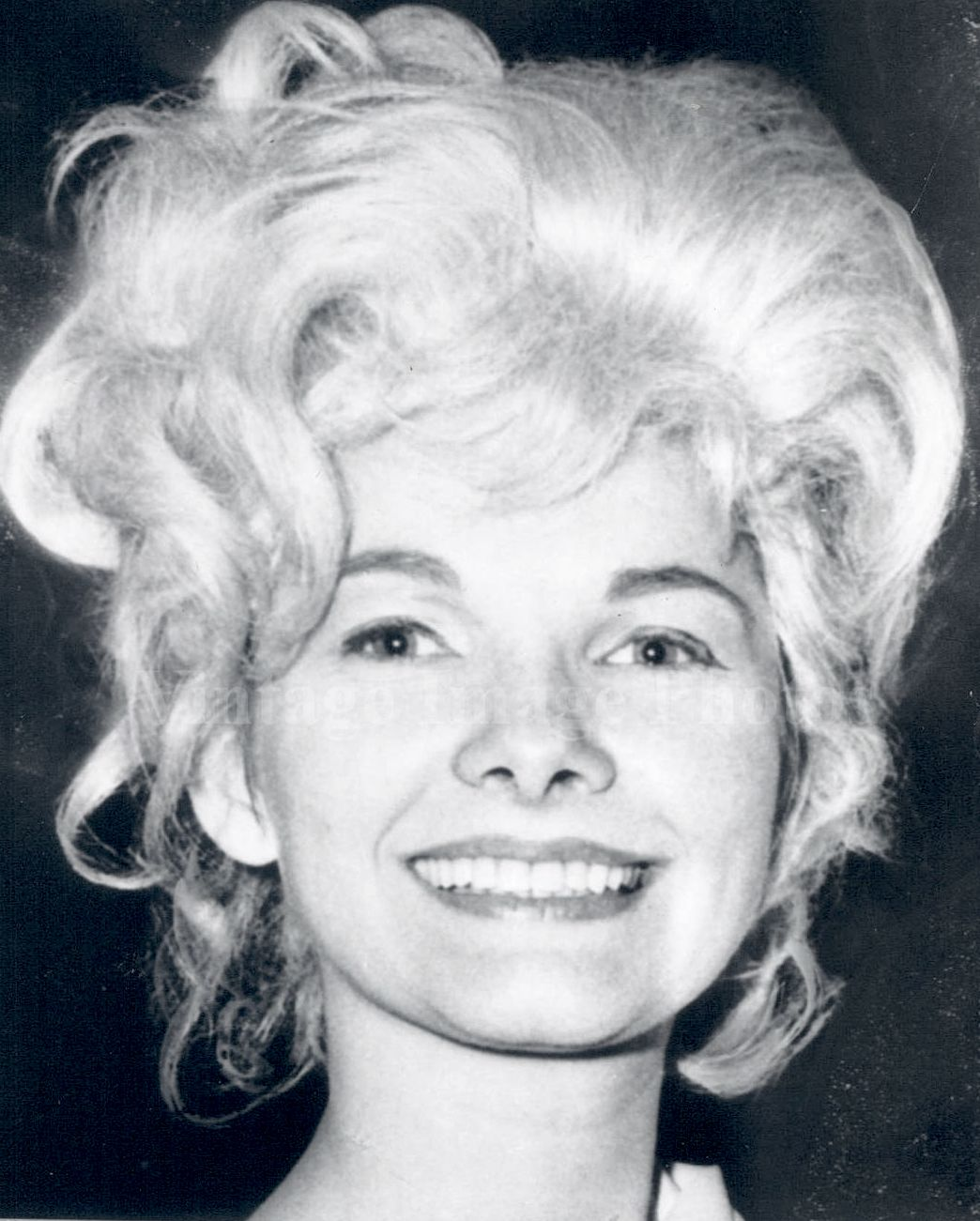
Barbara Loden in After the Hall (1964)

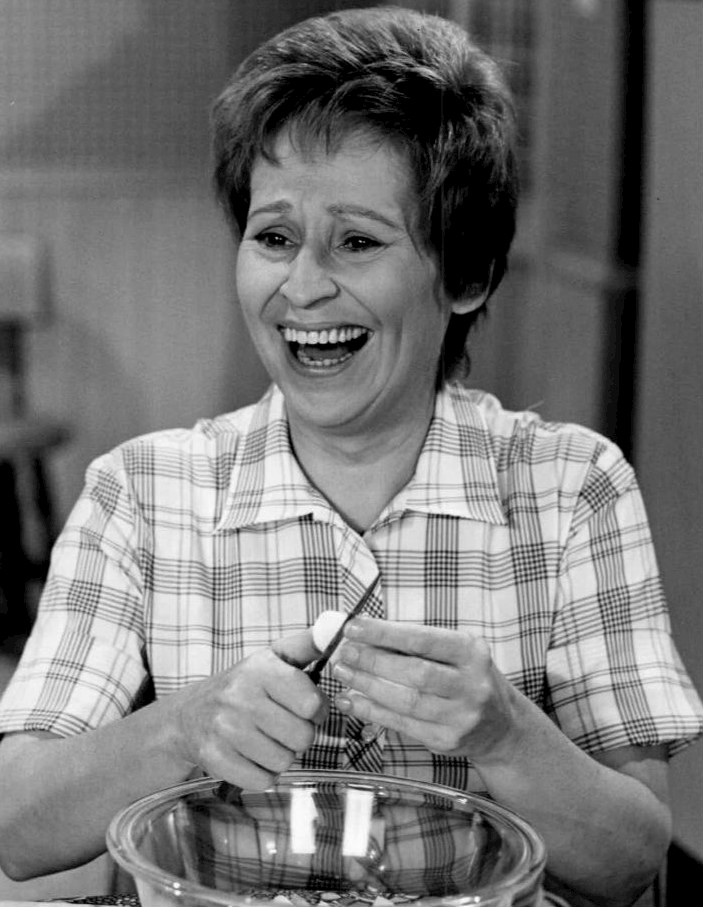
Alice Ghostley won for The Sign in Sidney Brustein's Window (1965)

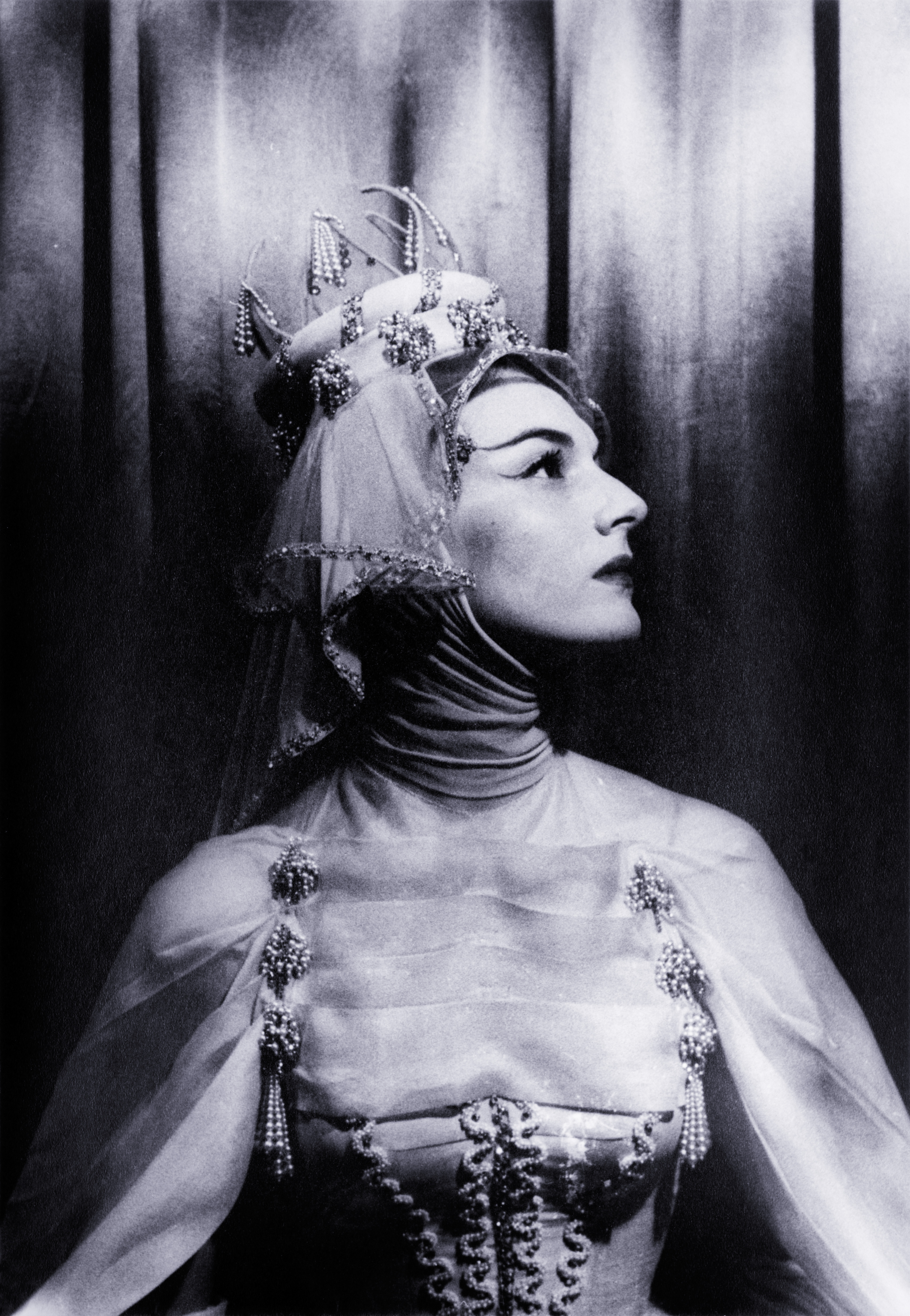
Marian Seldes won for A Delicate Balance (1967)

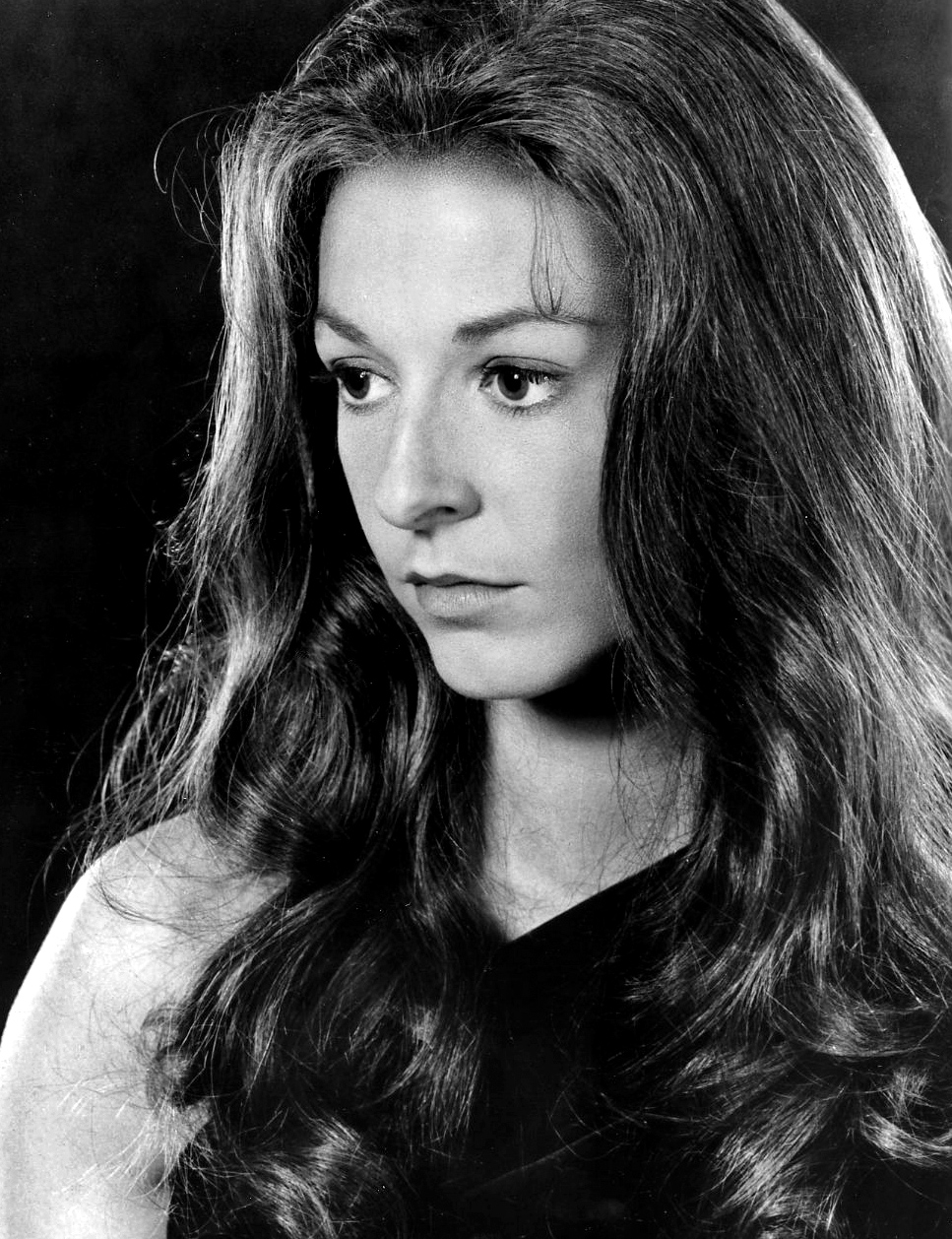
Jane Alexander won for The Great White Hope (1969)

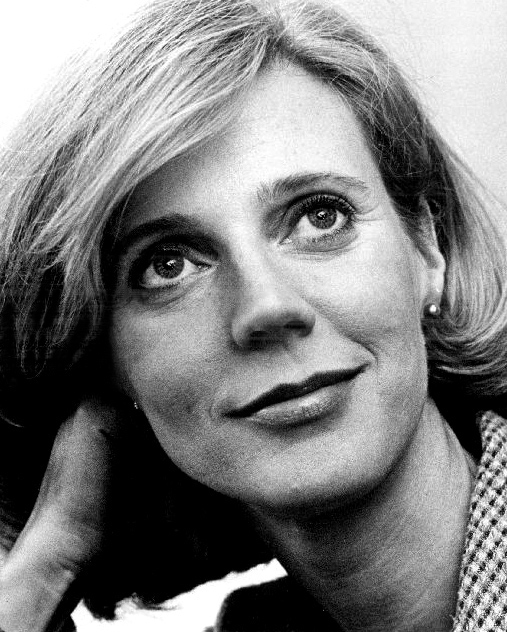
Blythe Danner won for Butterflies Are Free (1970)

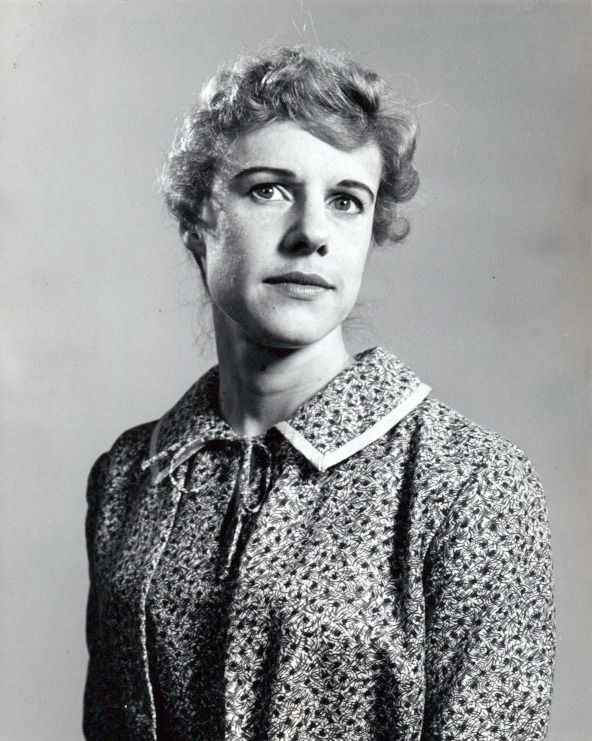
Frances Sternhagen won twice for The Good Doctor (1974) and The Heiress (1995)

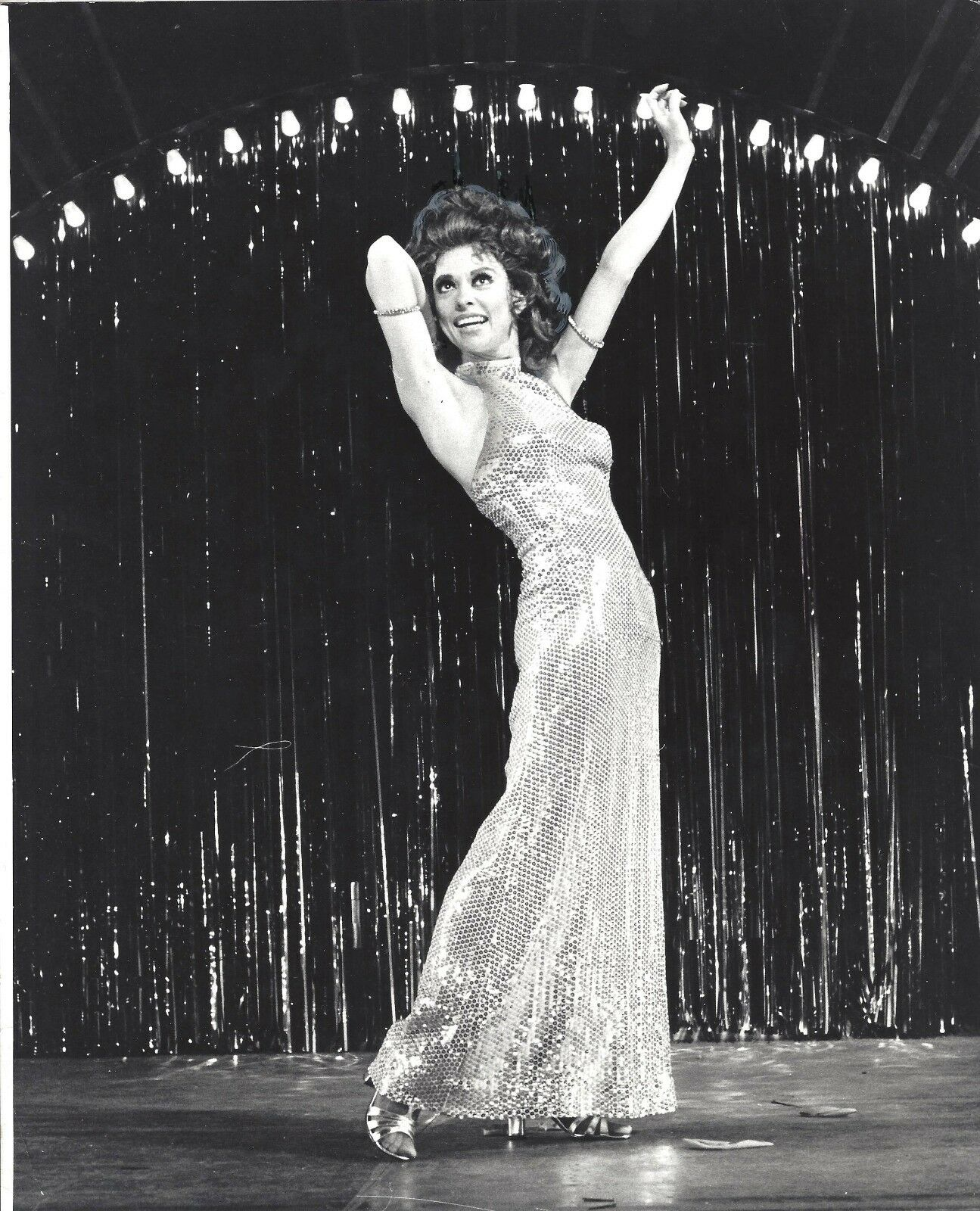
Rita Moreno won for The Ritz (1975)

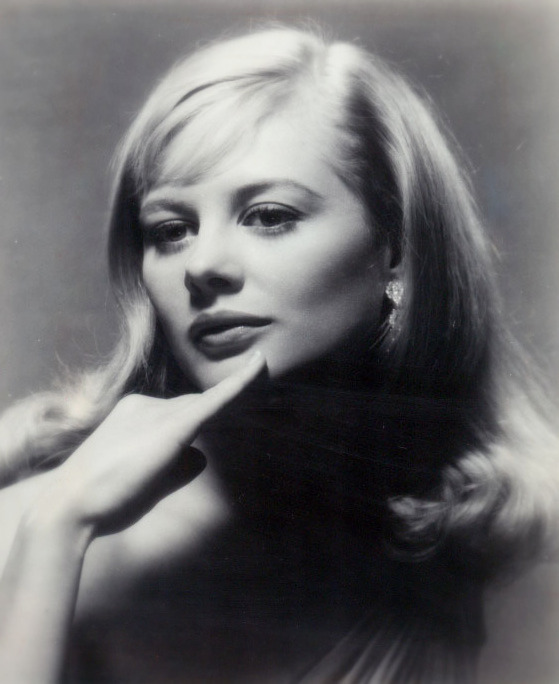
Shirley Knight won for Kennedy's Children (1976)

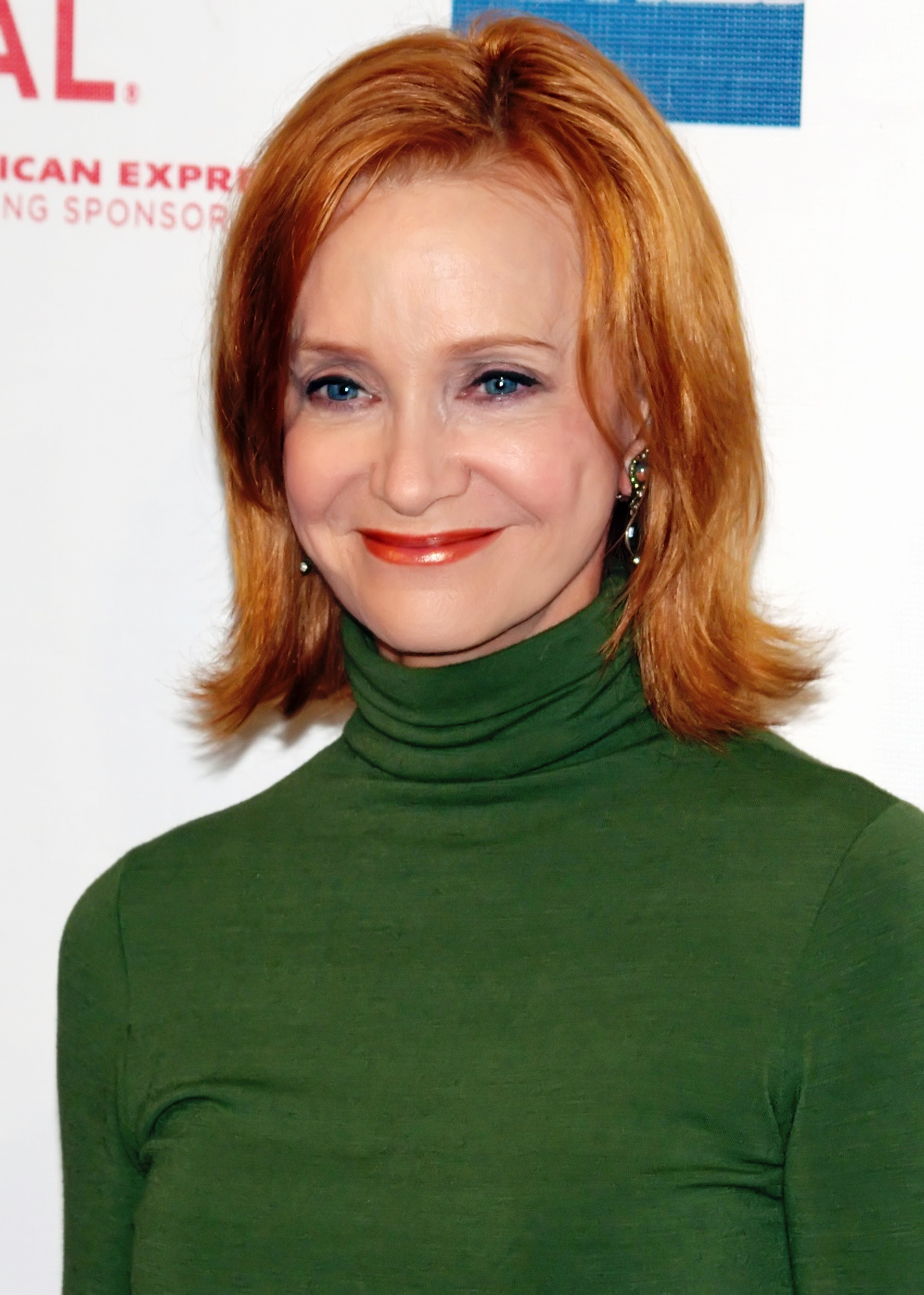
Two-time award winner Swoosie Kurtz in 1981 and 1986

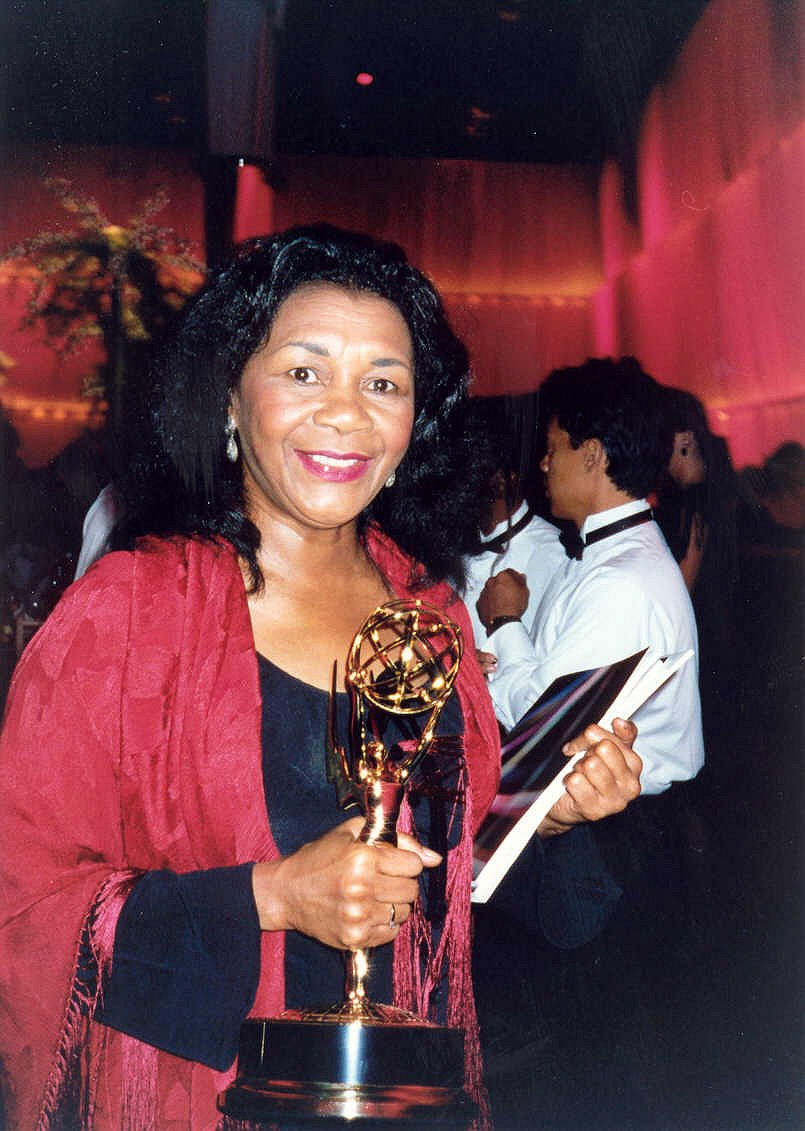
Mary Alice won for Fences (1987)

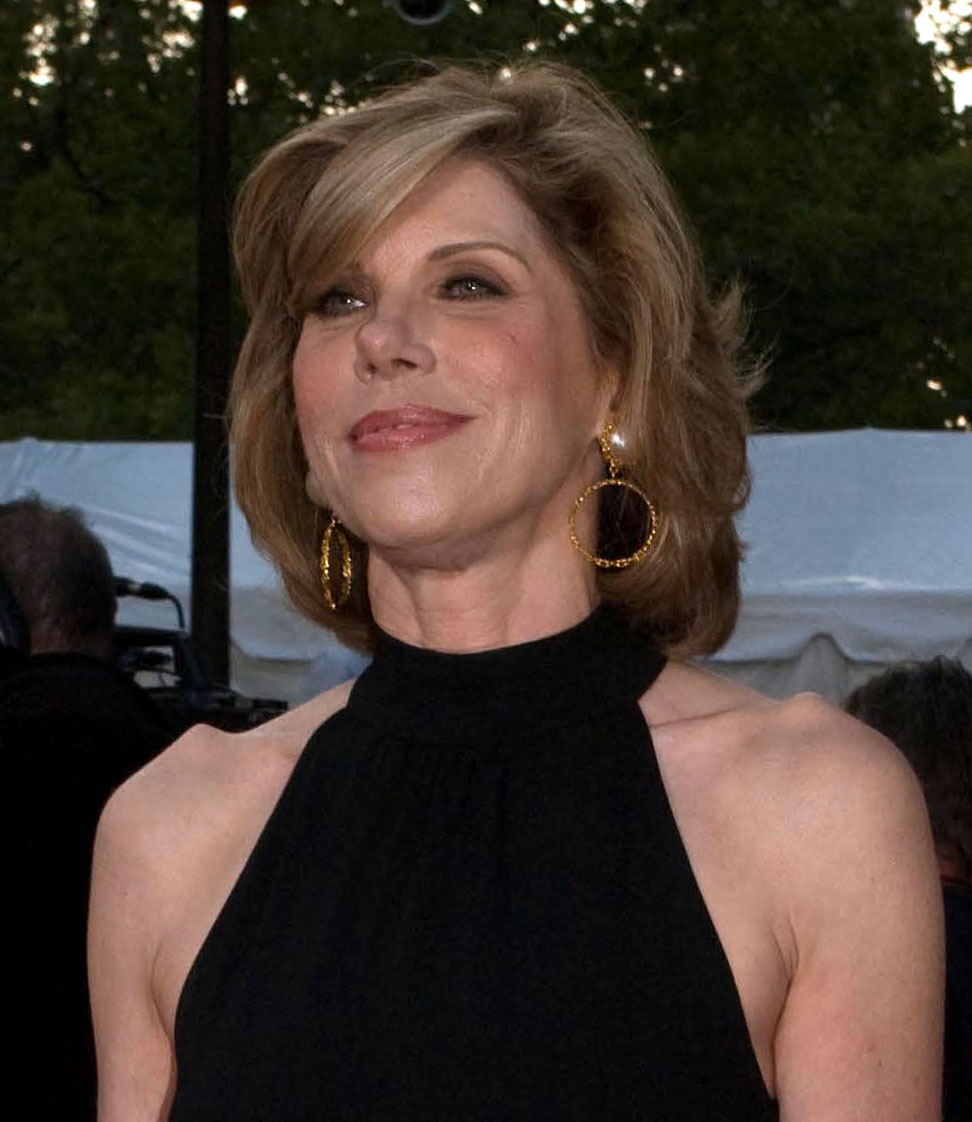
Christine Baranski won twice for The Real Thing (1984) and Rumors (1989)

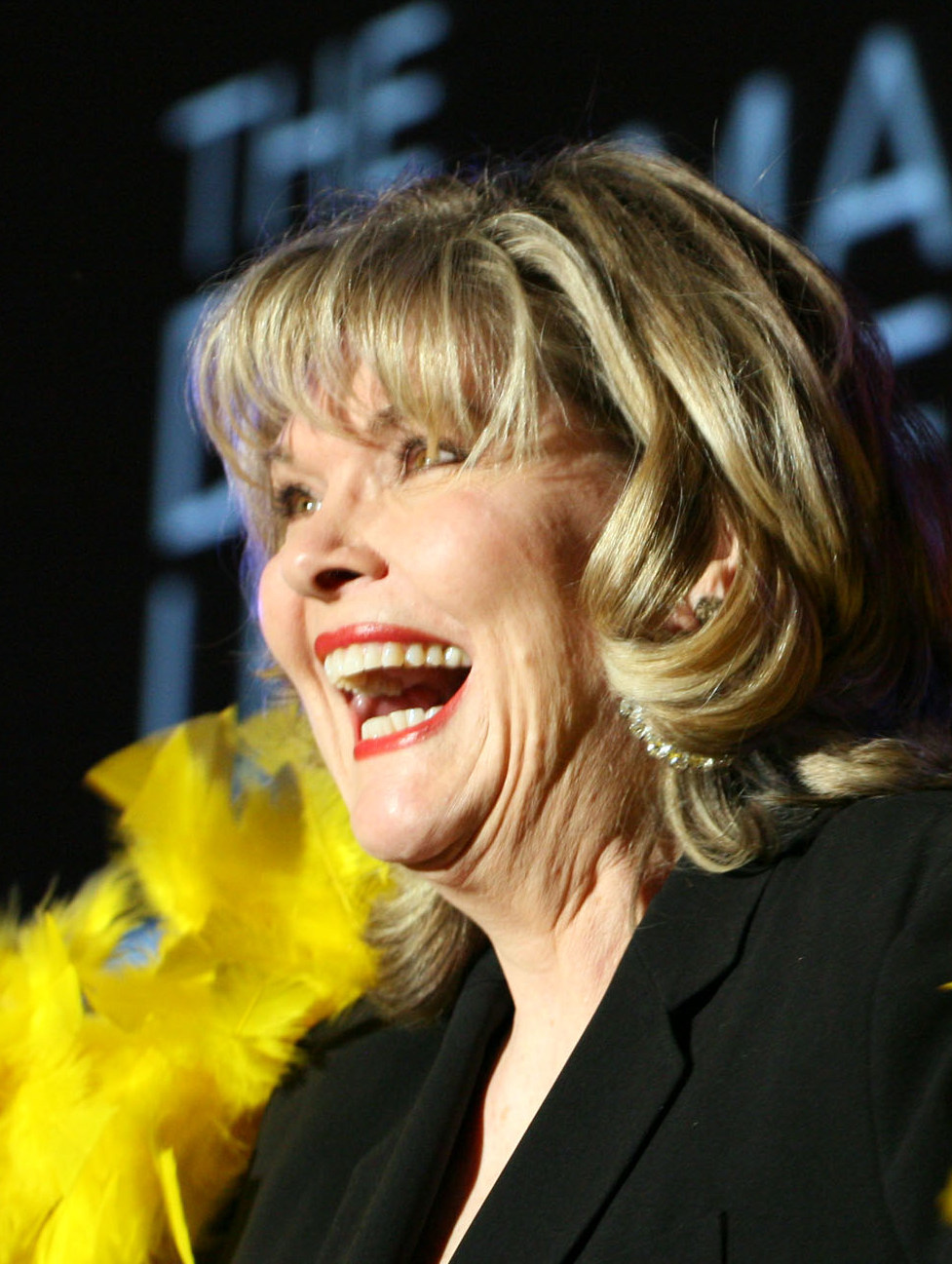
Debra Monk won for Redwood Curtain (1993)

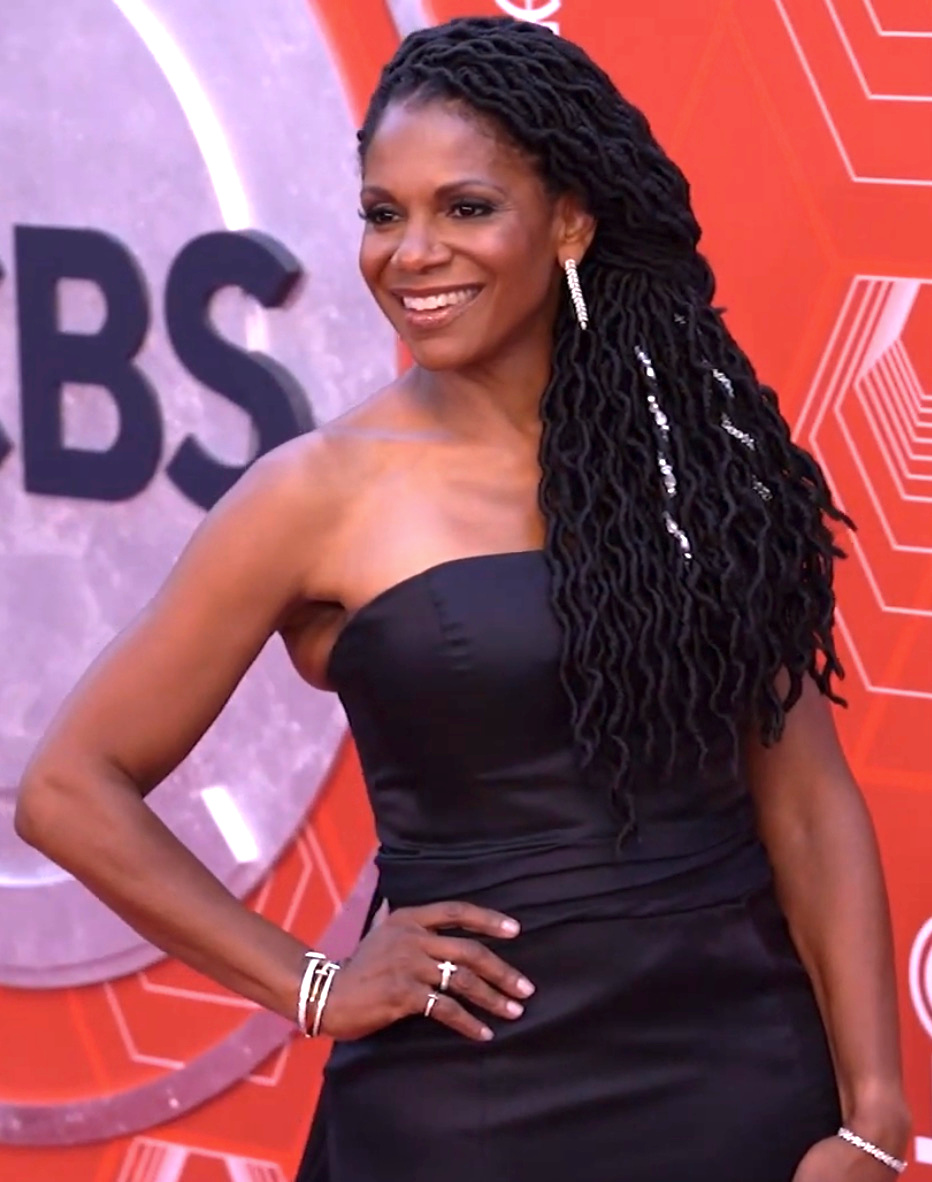
Two-time award winner Audra McDonald

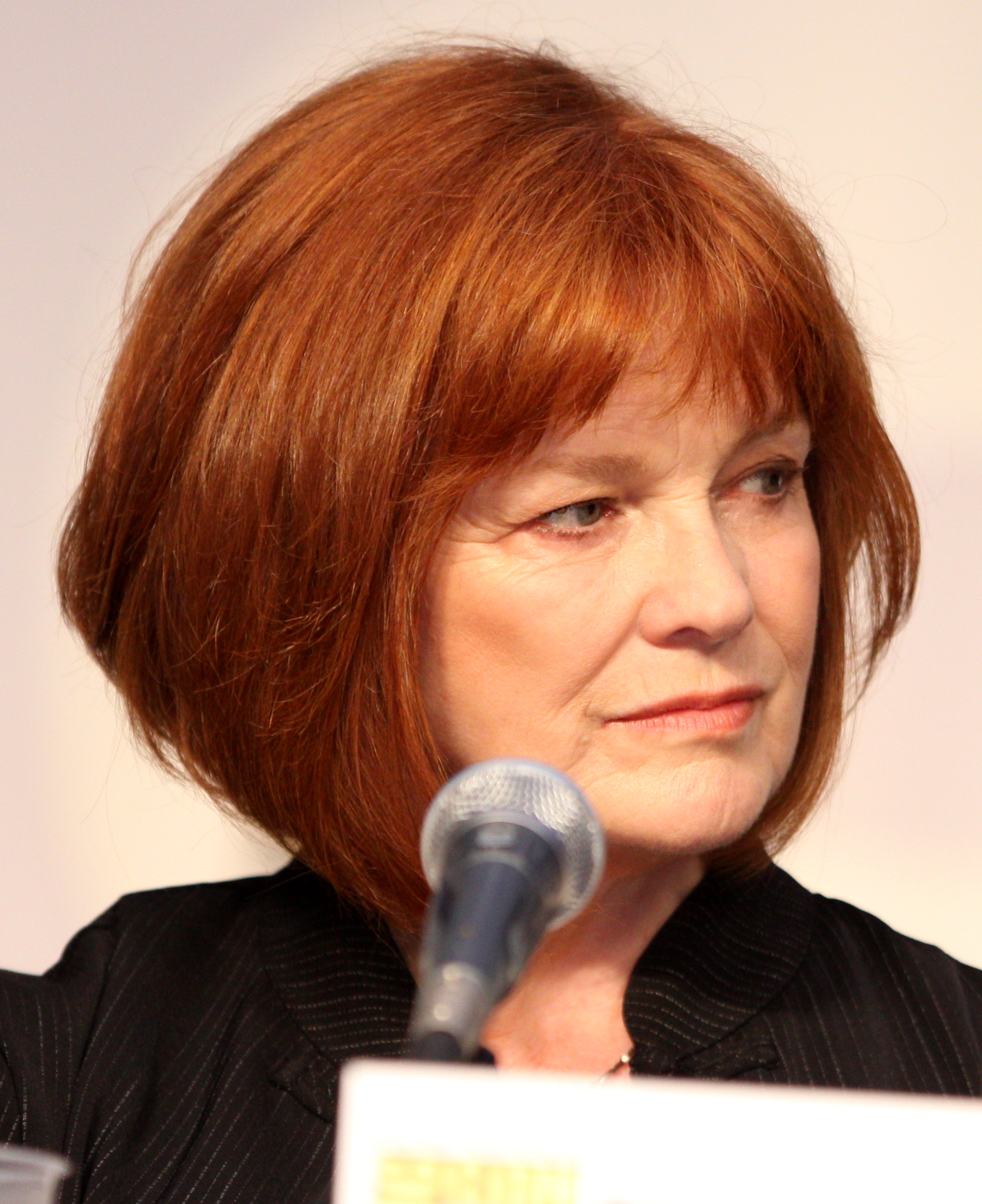
2000 award winner Blair Brown

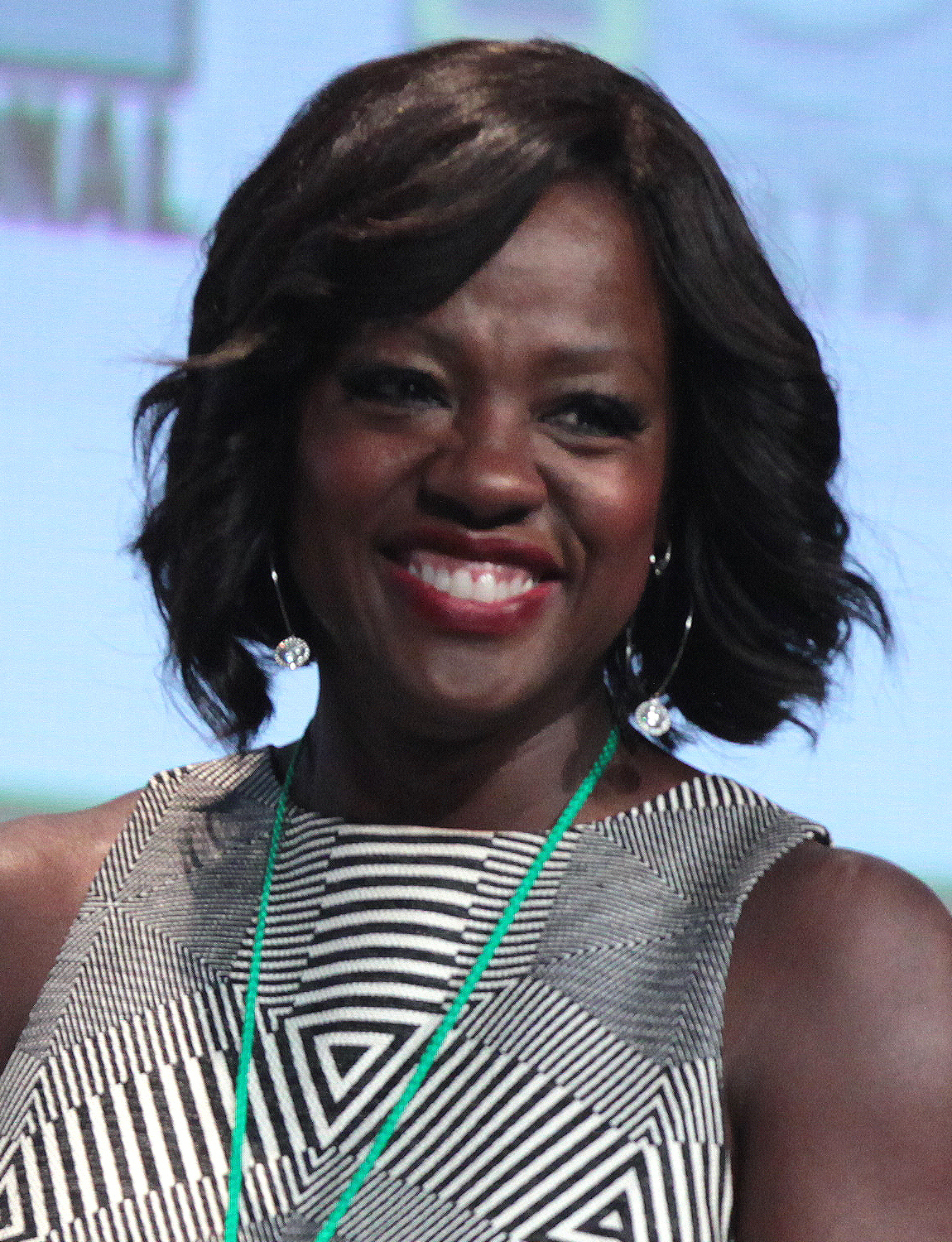
2001 award winner Viola Davis

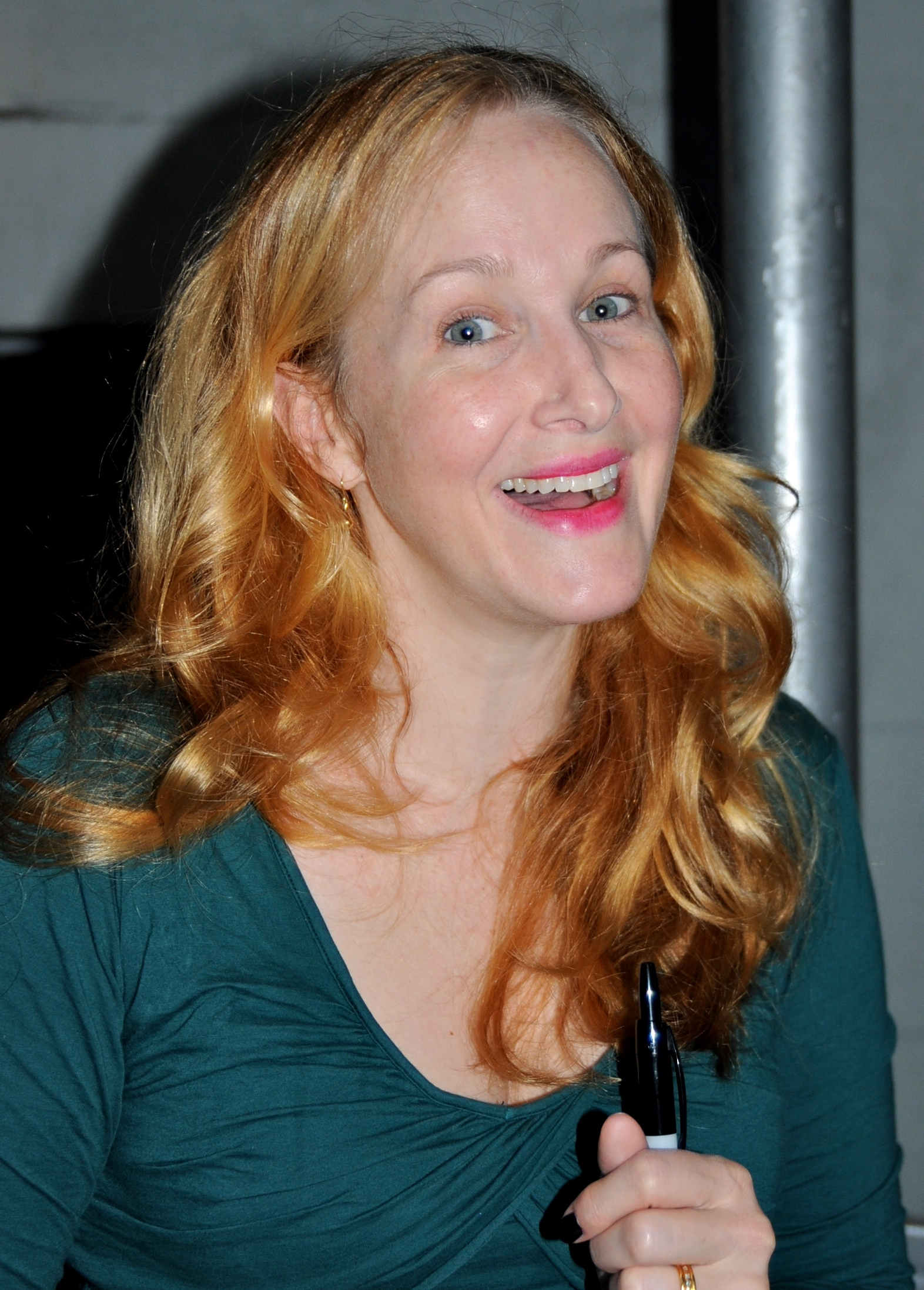
Katie Finneran won for Noises Off (2002)

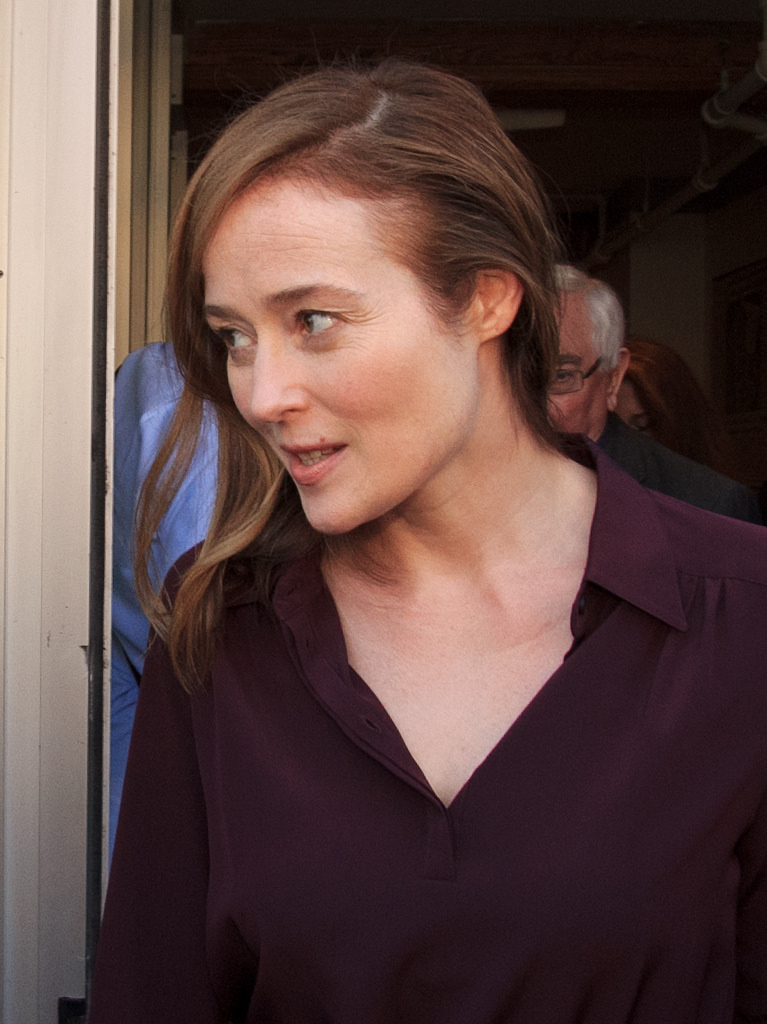
Jennifer Ehle won for The Coast of Utopia (2007)

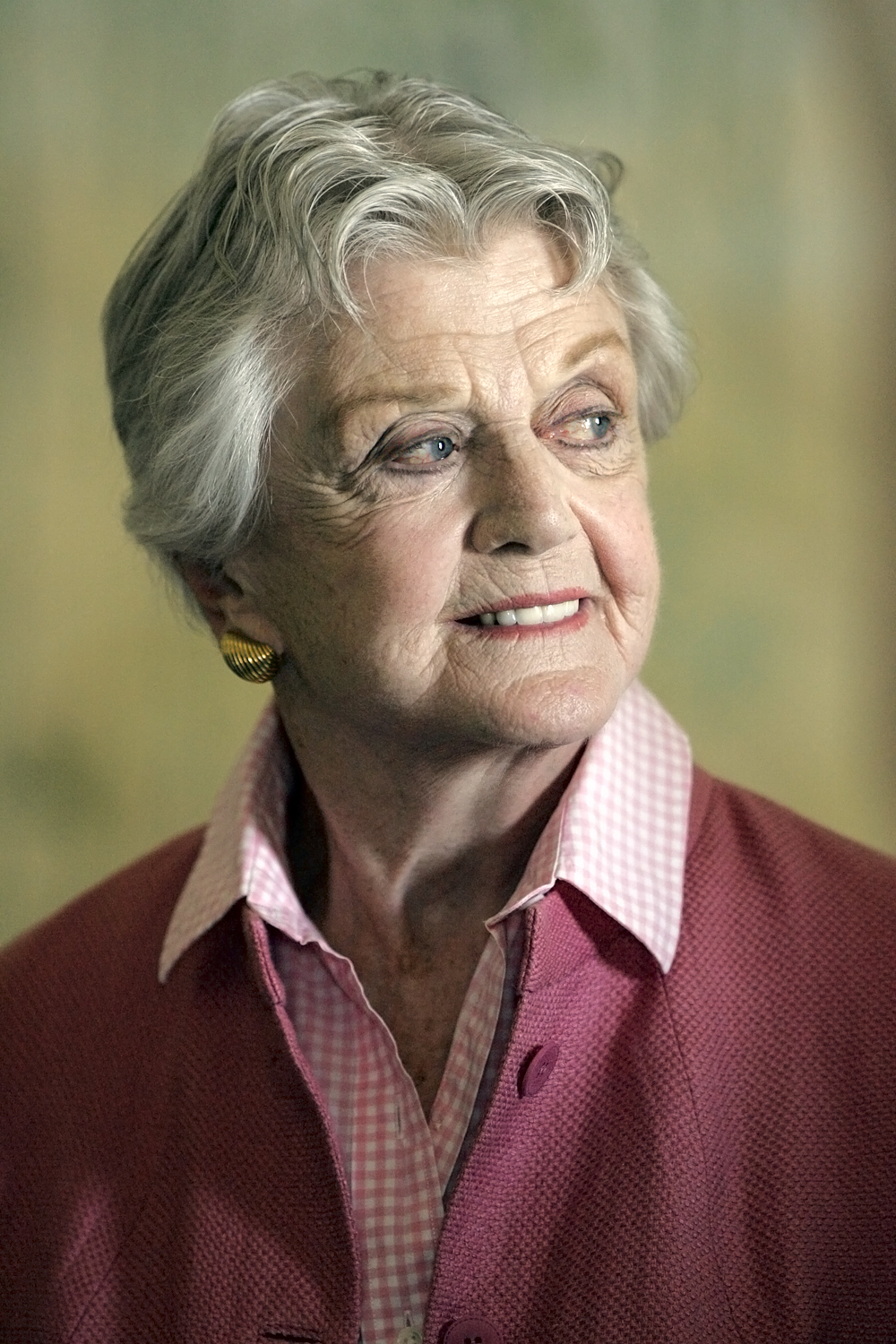
Angela Lansbury won for Blithe Spirit (2009)

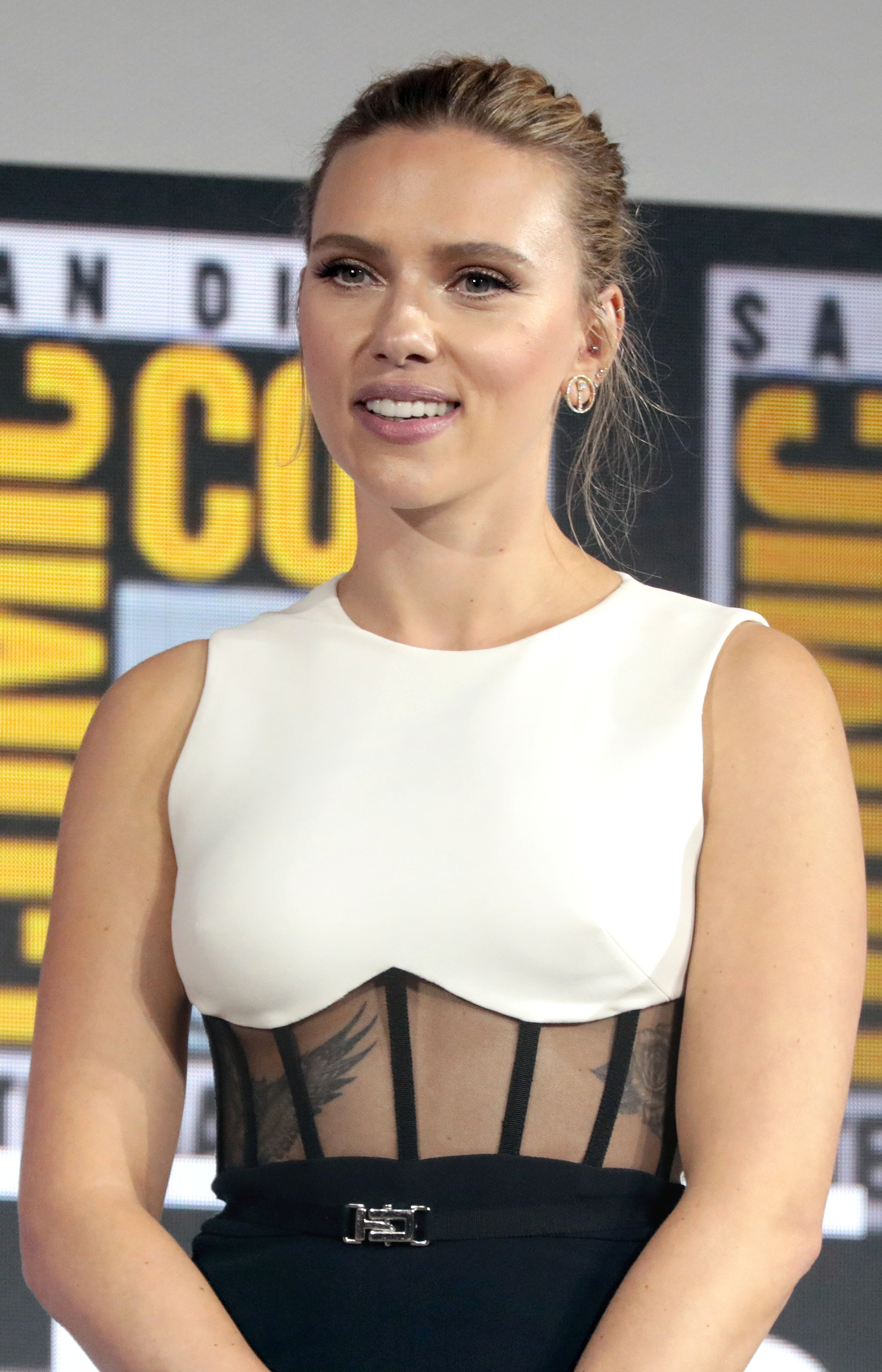
2010 award winner Scarlett Johansson

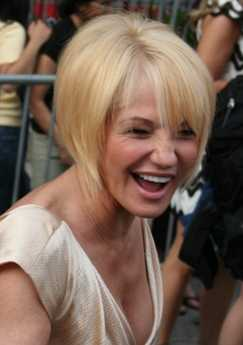
Ellen Barkin won for The Normal Heart (2011)

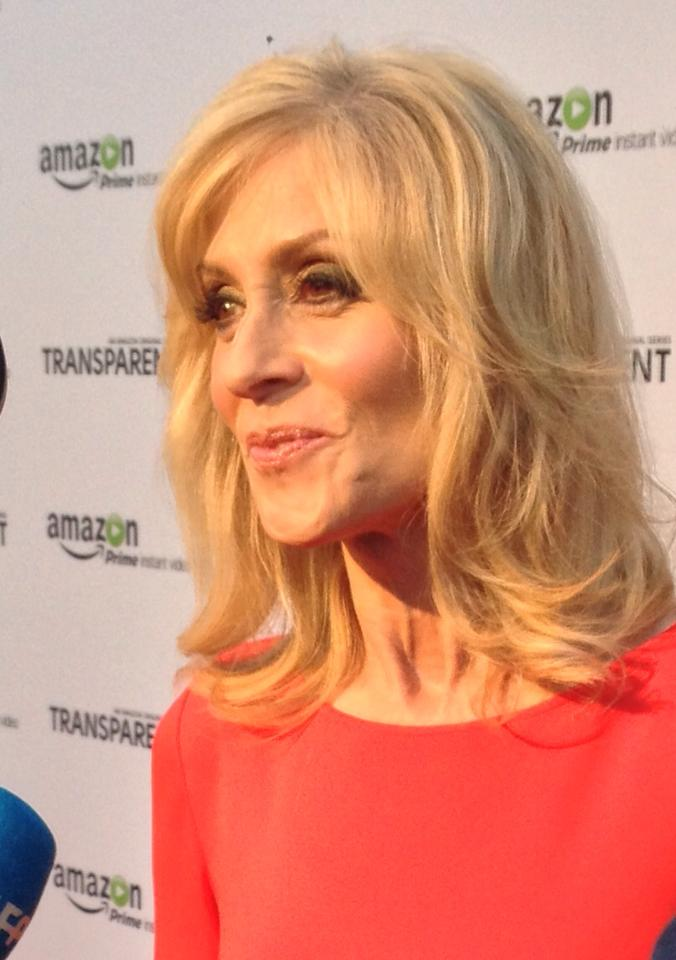
Judith Light won twice for Other Desert Cities (2012) and The Assembled Parties (2013)

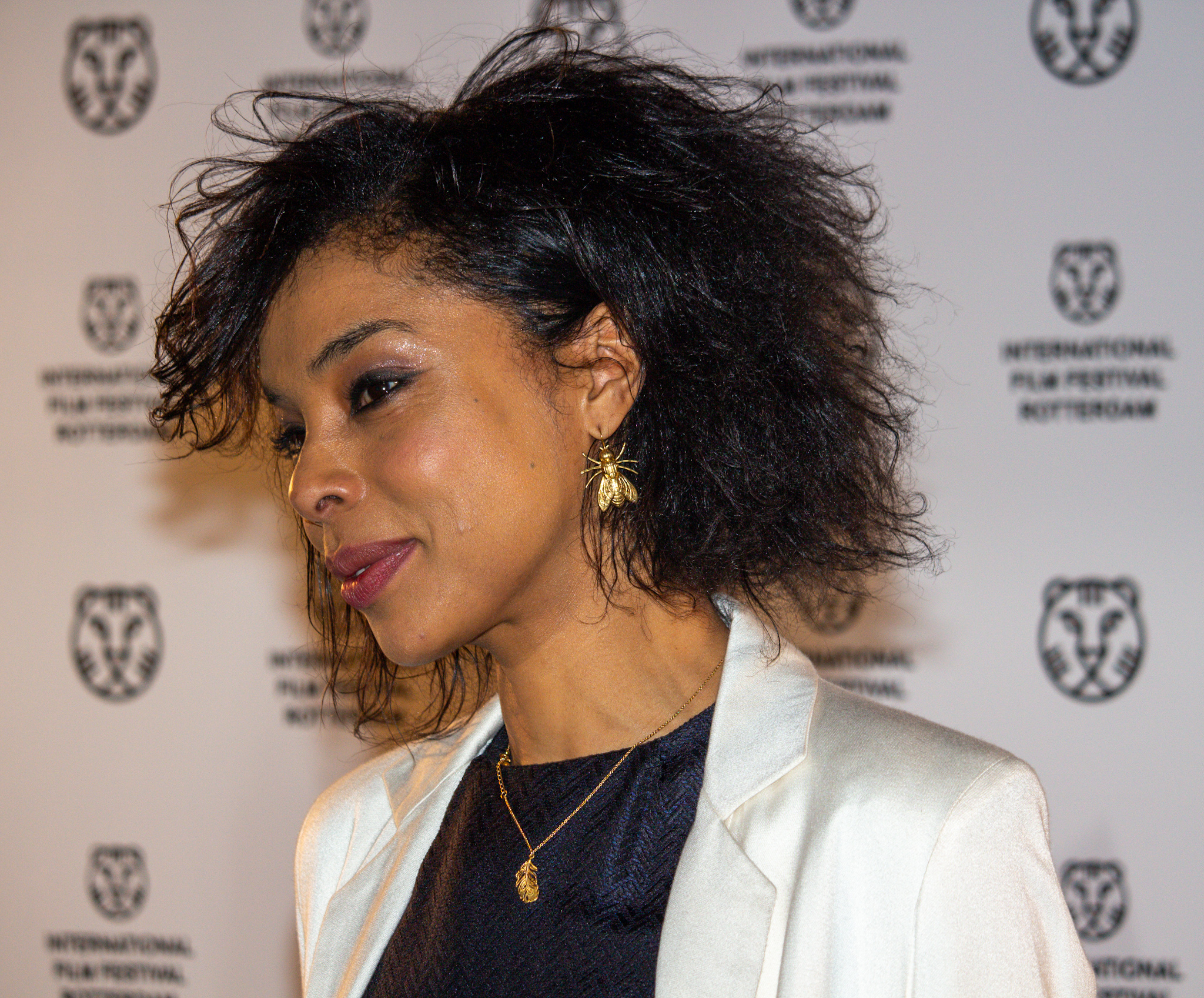
Sophie Okonedo won A Raisin in the Sun (2014)

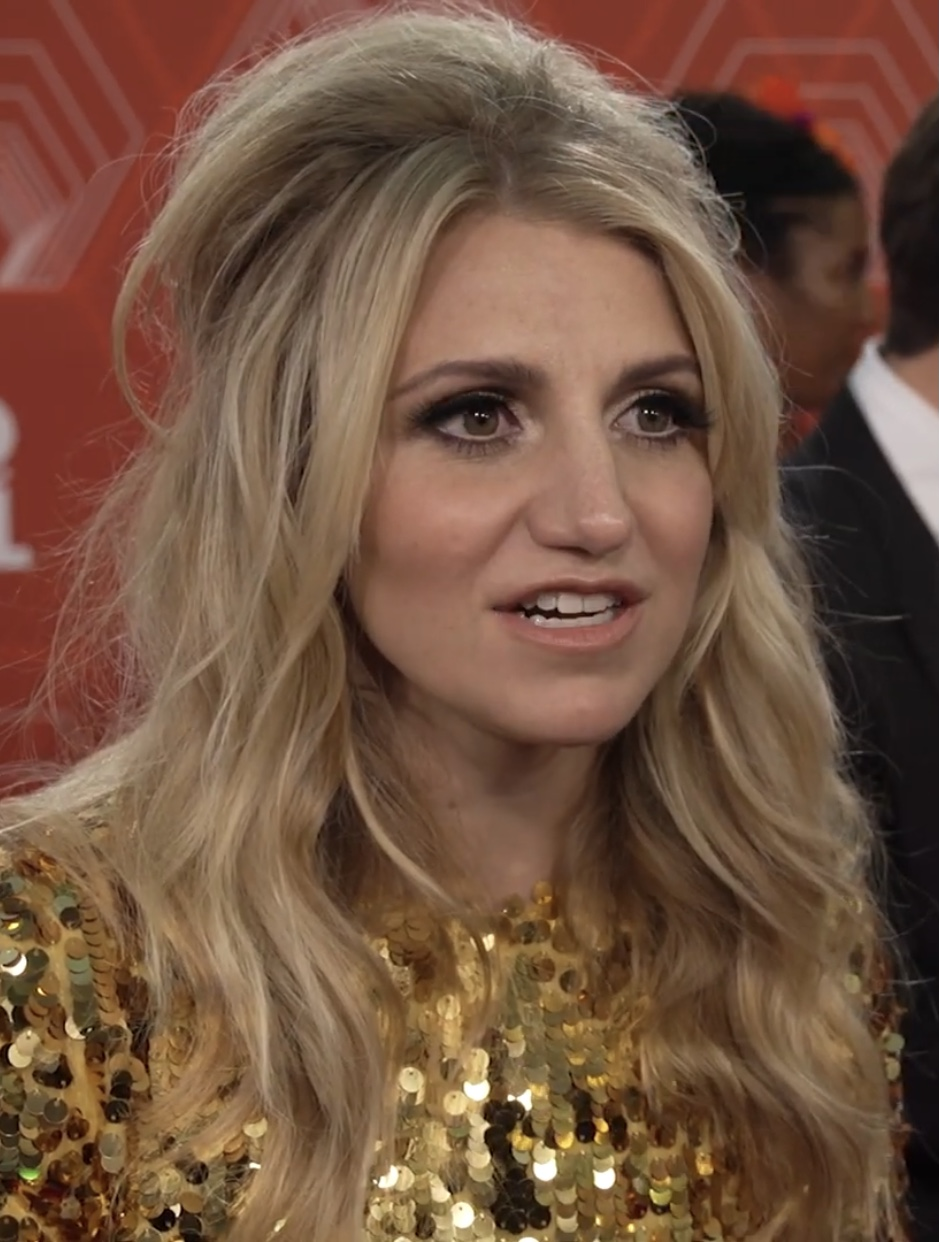
Annaleigh Ashford won for You Can't Take it With You (2015)

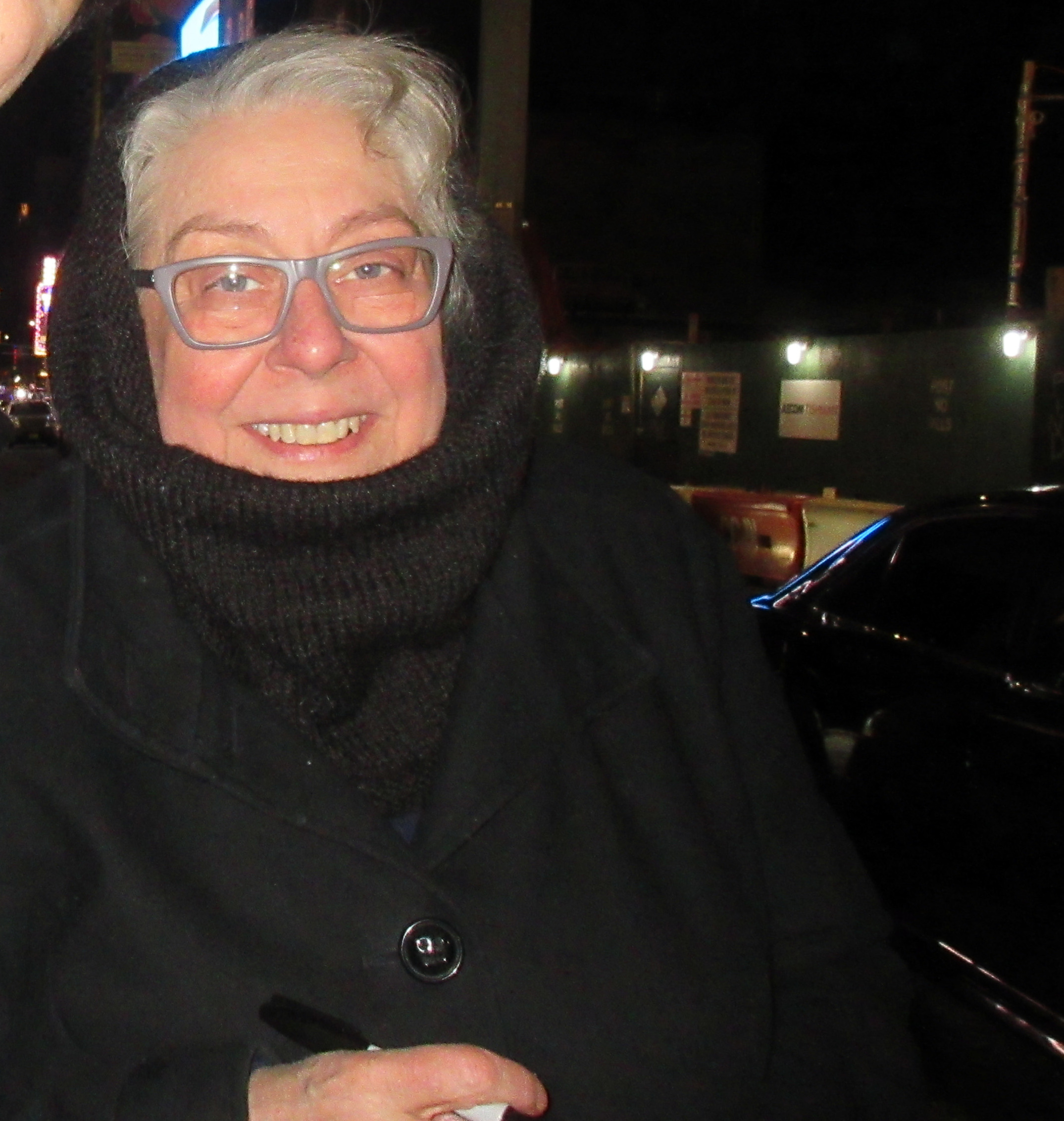
Jayne Houdyshell won for The Humans (2016)

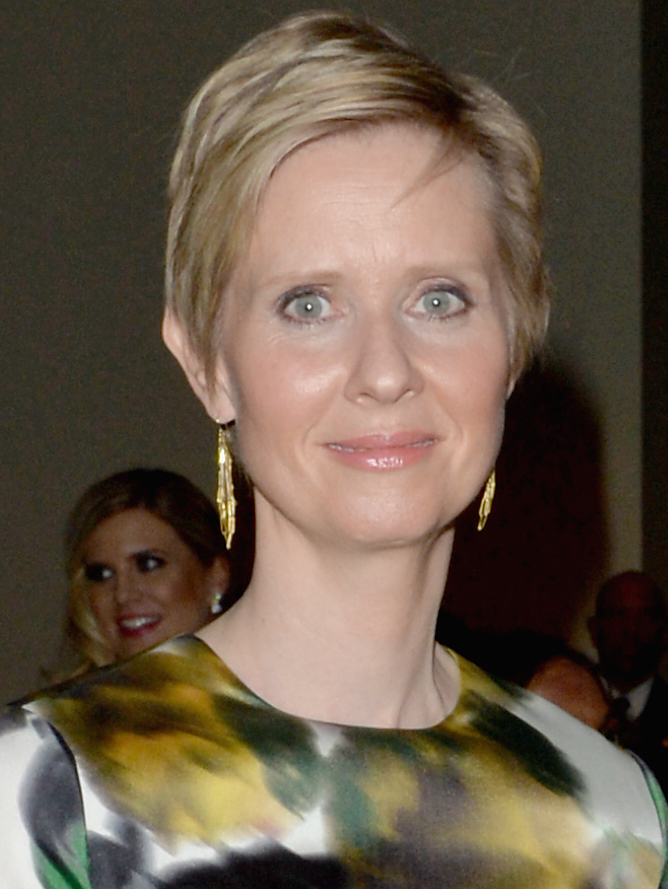
Cynthia Nixon won for The Little Foxes (2017)

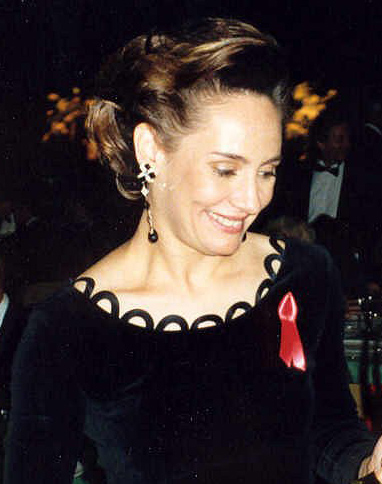
Laurie Metcalf won for Three Tall Women (2018) and Death of a Salesman (2026)

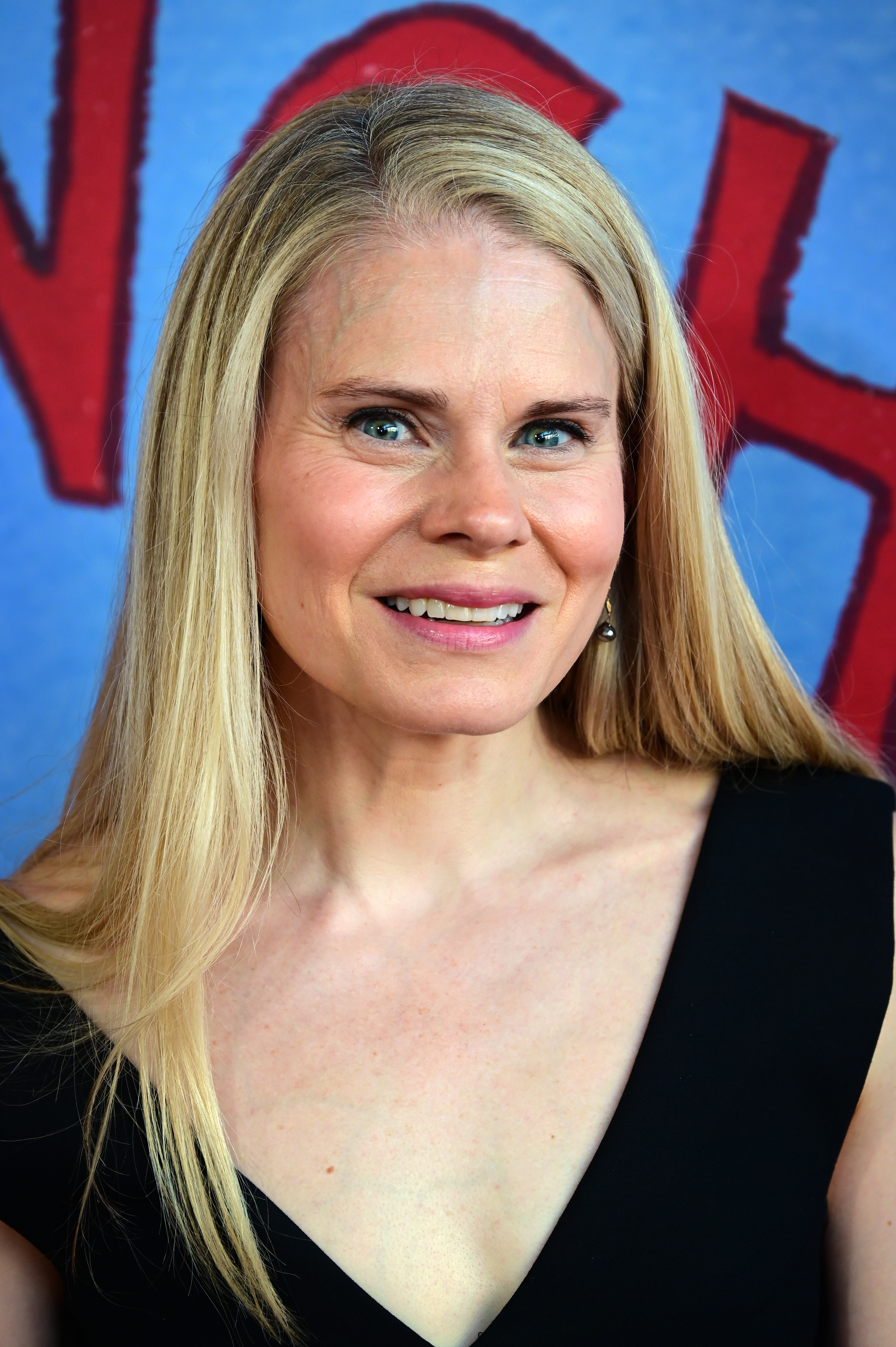
Celia Keenan-Bolger won for To Kill a Mockingbird (2019)

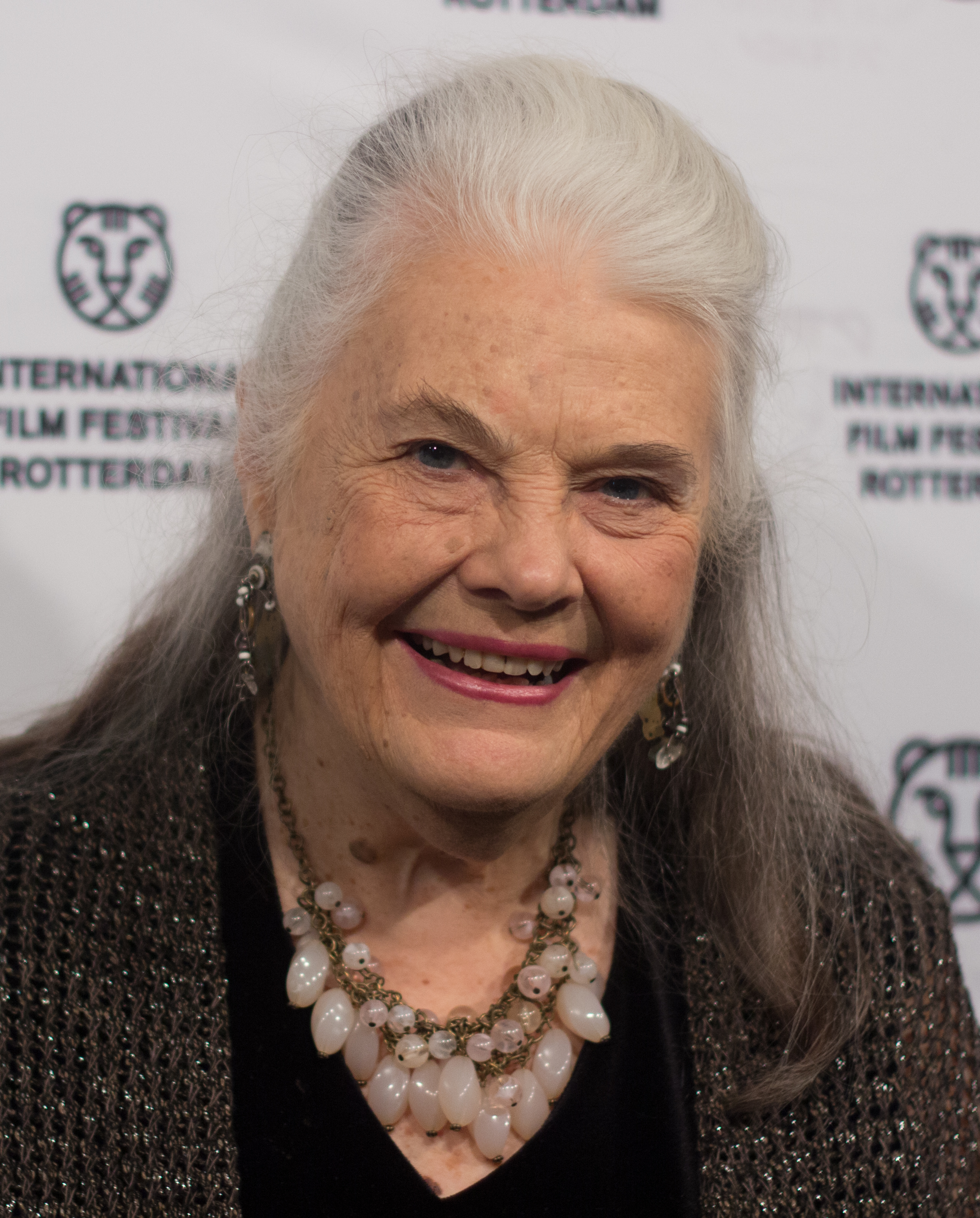
Lois Smith won for The Inheritance (2020)

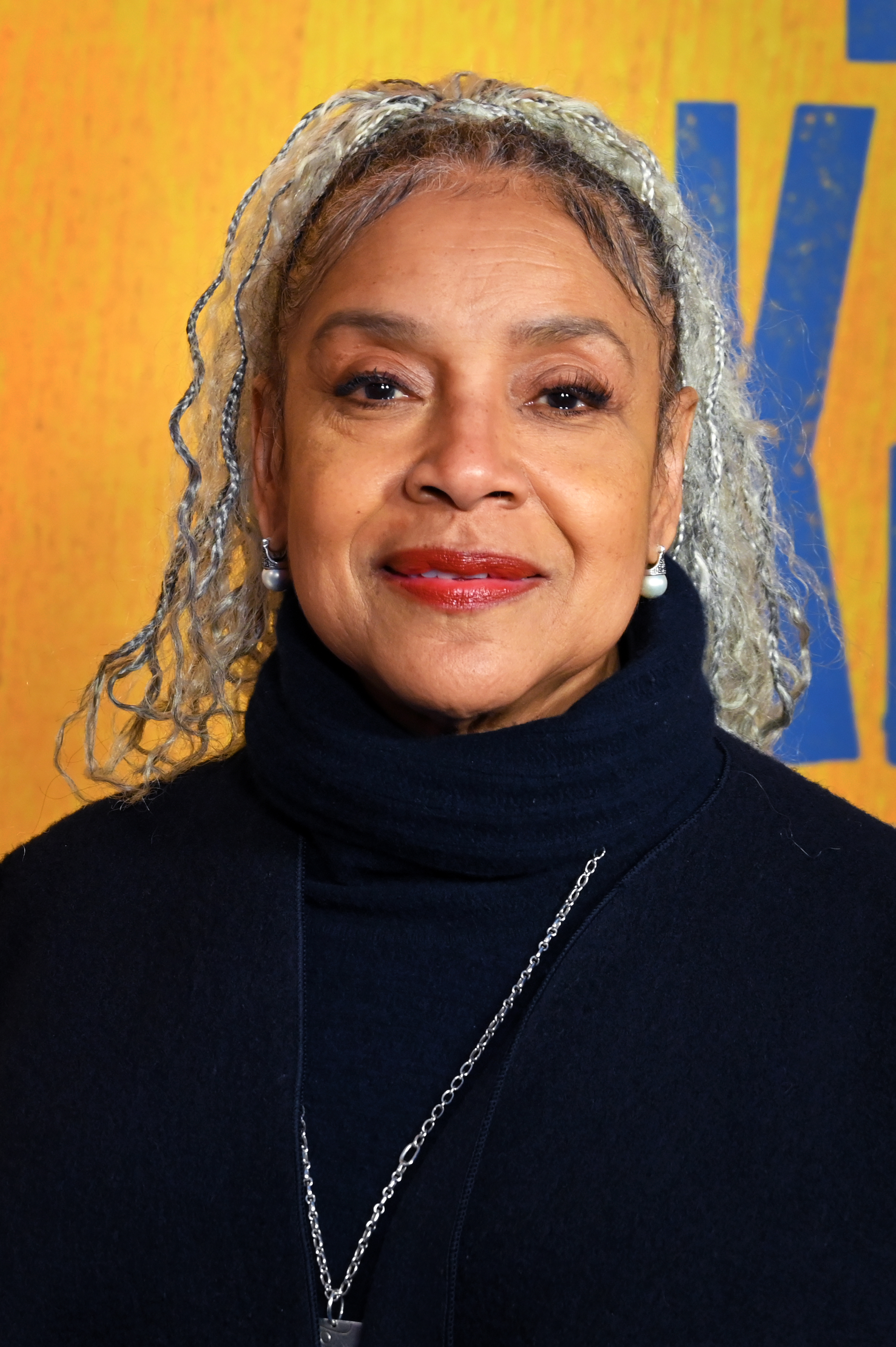
Phylicia Rashad won for Skeleton Crew (2022)

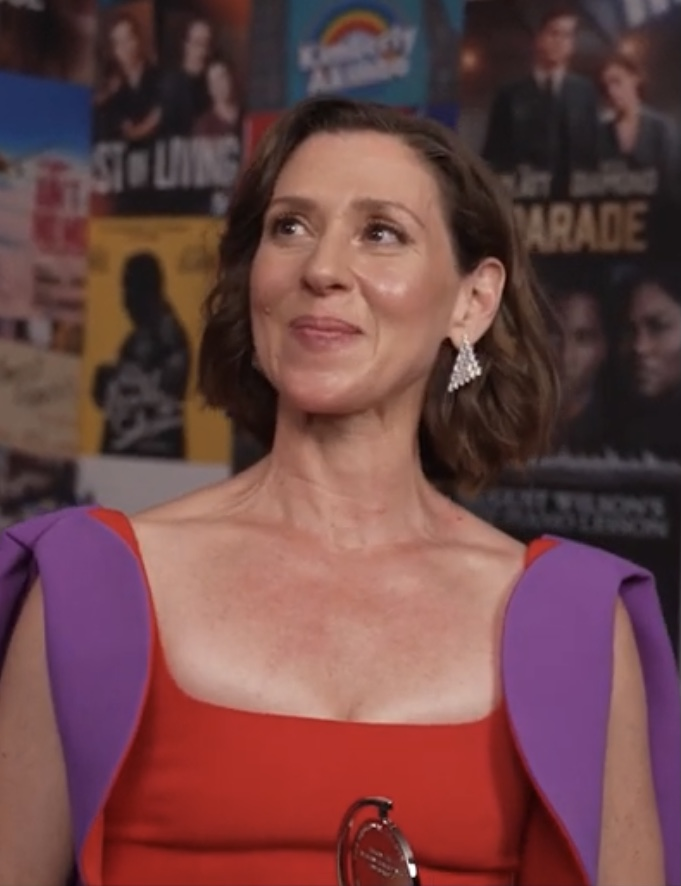
Miriam Silverman won for The Sign in Sidney Brustein's Window (2023)

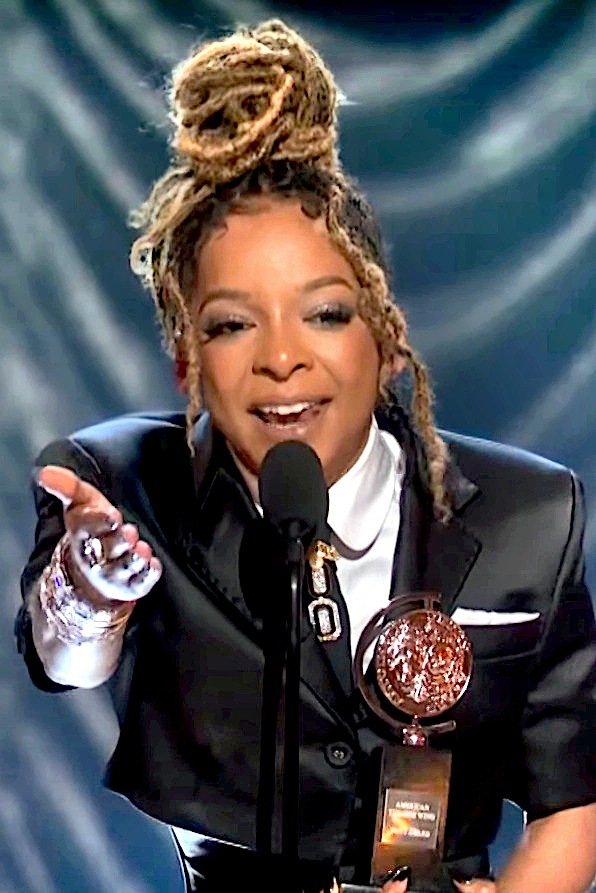
Kara Young won twice consecutively for Purlie Victorious (2024) and Purpose (2025).

=== 1940s ===
Year	Actor	Project	Role(s)	Ref.
1947 (1st)
1947 (1st)	Patricia Neal	Another Part of the Forest	Regina Hubbard	
1949 (3rd)
1949 (3rd)	Shirley Booth	Goodbye, My Fancy	Grace Woods	

=== 1950s ===
Year	Actor	Project	Role(s)	Ref.
1951 (5th)
1951 (5th)	Maureen Stapleton	The Rose Tattoo	Serafina Delle Rose	
1952 (6th)
1952 (6th)	Marian Winters	I Am a Camera	Natalia Landauer	
1953 (7th)
1953 (7th)	Beatrice Straight	The Crucible	Elizabeth Proctor	
1954 (8th)
1954 (8th)	Jo Van Fleet	The Trip to Bountiful	Jessie Mae Watts	
1955 (9th)
1955 (9th)	Patricia Jessel	Witness for the Prosecution	Romaine	
1956 (10th)
1956 (10th)	Una Merkel	The Ponder Heart	Edna Earle Ponder	
1956 (10th)	Diane Cilento	Tiger at the Gates	Helen of Troy	
1956 (10th)	Anne Jackson	Middle of the Night	The Daughter	
1956 (10th)	Elaine Stritch	Bus Stop	Grace Hoylard	
1957 (11th)
1957 (11th)	Peggy Cass	Auntie Mame	Agnes Gooch	
1957 (11th)	Anna Massey	The Reluctant Debutante	Jane Broadbent	
1957 (11th)	Beryl Measor	Separate Tables	Pat Cooper	
1957 (11th)	Mildred Natwick	The Waltz of the Toreadors	Mme. St. Pé	
1957 (11th)	Phyllis Neilson-Terry	Separate Tables	Mrs. Railton-Bell	
1957 (11th)	Diana Van der Vlis	The Happiest Millionaire	Cordelia Biddle	
1958 (12th)
1958 (12th)	Anne Bancroft	Two for the Seesaw	Gittel Mosca	
1958 (12th)	Brenda De Banzie	The Entertainer	Phoebe Rice	
1958 (12th)	Joan Blondell	The Rope Dancers	Mrs. Farrow	
1958 (12th)	Mary Fickett	Sunrise at Campobello	Eleanor Roosevelt	
1958 (12th)	Eileen Heckart	The Dark at the Top of the Stairs	Lottie Lacey	
1959 (13th)
1959 (13th)	Julie Newmar	The Marriage-Go-Round	Katrin Sveg	
1959 (13th)	Maureen Delany	God and Kate Murphy	Carrie Donovan	
1959 (13th)	Dolores Hart	The Pleasure of His Company	Jessica Poole	
1959 (13th)	Nan Martin	J.B.	Sarah	
1959 (13th)	Bertice Reading	Requiem for a Nun	Nancy Mannigoe	

=== 1960s ===
Year	Actor	Project	Role(s)	Ref.
1960 (14th)
1960 (14th)	Anne Revere	Toys in the Attic	Anna Berniers	
1960 (14th)	Leora Dana	The Best Man	DeeDee Grogan	
1960 (14th)	Jane Fonda	There Was a Little Girl	Toni Newton	
1960 (14th)	Sarah Marshall	Goodbye Charlie	Rusty Mayerling	
1960 (14th)	Juliet Mills	Five Finger Exercise	Pamela Harrington	
1961 (15th)
1961 (15th)	Colleen Dewhurst	All the Way Home	Mary Follet	
1961 (15th)	Eileen Heckart	Invitation to a March	DeeDee Grogan	
1961 (15th)	Tresa Hughes	The Devil's Advocate	Nina Sanduzzi	
1961 (15th)	Rosemary Murphy	Period of Adjustment	Dorothea Bates	
1962 (16th)
1962 (16th)	Elizabeth Ashley	Take Her, She's Mine	Mollie Michaelson	
1962 (16th)	Zohra Lampert	Look: We've Come Through	Jennifer Lewison	
1962 (16th)	Janet Margolin	Daughter of Silence	Anna Albertini	
1962 (16th)	Pat Stanley	Sunday in New York	Eileen Taylor	
1963 (17th)
1963 (17th)	Sandy Dennis	A Thousand Clowns	Sandra Markowitz	
1963 (17th)	Melinda Dillon	Who's Afraid of Virginia Woolf?	Honey	
1963 (17th)	Alice Ghostley	The Beauty Part	Various Characters	
1963 (17th)	Zohra Lampert	Mother Courage and Her Children	Kattrin	
1964 (18th)
1964 (18th)	Barbara Loden	After the Fall	Maggie	
1964 (18th)	Rosemary Murphy	Any Wednesday	Dorothea Cleves	
1964 (18th)	Kate Reid	Dylan	Caitlin Thomas	
1964 (18th)	Diana Sands	Blues for Mister Charlie	Juanita	
1965 (19th)
1965 (19th)	Alice Ghostley	The Sign in Sidney Brustein's Window	Mavis Parodus Bryson	
1965 (19th)	Rae Allen	Traveller Without Luggage	Juliette	
1965 (19th)	Alexandra Berlin	All in Good Time	Violet Fitton	
1965 (19th)	Carolan Daniels	Slow Dance on the Killing Ground	Rosie	
1966 (20th)
1966 (20th)	Zoe Caldwell	Slapstick Tragedy	Polly	
1966 (20th)	Glenda Jackson	Marat/Sade	Charlotte Corday	
1966 (20th)	Mairin D. O'Sullivan	Philadelphia, Here I Come!	Madge Mulhern	
1966 (20th)	Brenda Vaccaro	Cactus Flower	Toni Simmons	
1967 (21st)
1967 (21st)	Marian Seldes	A Delicate Balance	Julia	
1967 (21st)	Camila Ashland	Black Comedy	Miss Furnival	
1967 (21st)	Brenda Forbes	The Loves of Cass McGuire	Trilbe Costello	
1967 (21st)	Maria Tucci	The Rose Tattoo	Rose Dell Rose	
1968 (22nd)
1968 (22nd)	Zena Walker	A Day in the Death of Joe Egg	Sheila	
1968 (22nd)	Pert Kelton	Spofford	Mrs. Punck	
1968 (22nd)	Ruth White	The Birthday Party	Meg	
1968 (22nd)	Eleanor D. "Siddy" Wilson	The Weekend	Mrs. Andrews	
1969 (23rd)
1969 (23rd)	Jane Alexander	The Great White Hope	Eleanor Bachman	
1969 (23rd)	Diane Keaton	Play It Again, Sam	Linda Christie	
1969 (23rd)	Lauren Jones	Does a Tiger Wear a Necktie?	Linda	
1969 (23rd)	Anna Manahan	Lovers	Hanna Wilson	

=== 1970s ===
Year	Actor	Project	Role(s)	Ref.
1970 (24th)
1970 (24th)	Blythe Danner	Butterflies Are Free	Jill Tanner	
1970 (24th)	Alice Drummond	The Chinese and Dr. Fish	Mrs. Lee	
1970 (24th)	Eileen Heckart	Butterflies Are Free	Mrs. Baker	
1970 (24th)	Linda Lavin	Last of the Red Hot Lovers	Elaine Navazio	
1971 (25th)
1971 (25th)	Rae Allen	And Miss Reardon Drinks a Little	Fleur Stein	
1971 (25th)	Lili Darvas	Les Blancs	Madame Neilsen	
1971 (25th)	Joan Van Ark	The School for Wives	Agnes	
1971 (25th)	Mona Washbourne	Home	Marian	
1972 (26th)
1972 (26th)	Elizabeth Wilson	Sticks and Bones	Harriet	
1972 (26th)	Cara Duff-MacCormick	Moonchildren	Shelly	
1972 (26th)	Mercedes McCambridge	The Love Suicide at Schofield Barracks	Lucy Lake	
1972 (26th)	Frances Sternhagen	The Sign in Sidney Brustein's Window	Mavis Parodus Bryson	
1973 (27th)
1973 (27th)	Leora Dana	The Last of Mrs. Lincoln	Elizabeth Edwards	
1973 (27th)	Maya Angelou	Look Away	Elizabeth Keckley	
1973 (27th)	Katherine Helmond	The Great God Brown	Margaret	
1973 (27th)	Penelope Windust	Elizabeth I	Elizabeth I	
1974 (28th)
1974 (28th)	Frances Sternhagen	The Good Doctor	Various Characters	
1974 (28th)	Regina Baff	Veronica's Room	Susan	
1974 (28th)	Fionnula Flanagan	Ulysses in Nighttown	Various Characters	
1974 (28th)	Charlotte Moore	Chemin de Fer	Sophie	
1974 (28th)	Roxie Roker	The River Niger	Mattie Williams	
1975 (29th)
1975 (29th)	Rita Moreno	The Ritz	Googie Gomez	
1975 (29th)	Linda Miller	Black Picture Show	Jane	
1975 (29th)	Geraldine Page	Absurd Person Singular	Marion	
1975 (29th)	Carole Shelley	Absurd Person Singular	Jane	
1975 (29th)	Elizabeth Spriggs	London Assurance	Lady Gay Spanker	
1975 (29th)	Frances Sternhagen	Equus	Dora Strang	
1976 (30th)
1976 (30th)	Shirley Knight	Kennedy's Children	Carla	
1976 (30th)	Mary Beth Hurt	Trelawny of the 'Wells'	Rose Trewlawny	
1976 (30th)	Lois Nettleton	They Knew What They Wanted	Amy	
1976 (30th)	Meryl Streep	27 Wagons Full of Cotton	Flora Meighan	
1977 (31st)
1977 (31st)	Trazana Beverley	For Colored Girls Who Have Considered Suicide / When the Rainbow Is Enuf	Lady in Red	
1977 (31st)	Patricia Elliott	The Shadow Box	Beverly	
1977 (31st)	Rose Gregorio	The Shadow Box	Agnes	
1977 (31st)	Mary McCarty	Anna Christie	Marthy Owen	
1978 (32nd)
1978 (32nd)	Ann Wedgeworth	Chapter Two	Faye Medwick	
1978 (32nd)	Starletta DuPois	The Mighty Gents	Rita	
1978 (32nd)	Swoosie Kurtz	Tartuffe	Mariane	
1978 (32nd)	Marian Seldes	Deathtrap	Myra Bruhl	
1979 (33rd)
1979 (33rd)	Joan Hickson	Bedroom Farce	Delia	
1979 (33rd)	Laurie Kennedy	Man and Superman	Violet Robinson	
1979 (33rd)	Susan Littler	Bedroom Farce	Kate	
1979 (33rd)	Mary-Joan Negro	Wings	Amy	

=== 1980s ===
Year	Actor	Project	Role(s)	Ref.
1980 (34th)
1980 (34th)	Dinah Manoff	I Ought to Be in Pictures	Libby Tucker	
1980 (34th)	Maureen Anderman	The Lady from Dubuque	Carol	
1980 (34th)	Pamela Burrell	Strider	Various Characters	
1980 (34th)	Lois de Banzie	Morning's at Seven	Myrtle Brown	
1981 (35th)
1981 (35th)	Swoosie Kurtz	Fifth of July	Gwen Landis	
1981 (35th)	Maureen Stapleton	The Little Foxes	Birdie Hubbard	
1981 (35th)	Jessica Tandy	Rose	Rose's Mother	
1981 (35th)	Zoë Wanamaker	Piaf	Tione	
1982 (36th)
1982 (36th)	Amanda Plummer	Agnes of God	Agnes	
1982 (36th)	Judith Anderson	Medea	The Nurse	
1982 (36th)	Mia Dillon	Crimes of the Heart	Babe MaGrath Botrelle	
1982 (36th)	Mary Beth Hurt	Crimes of the Heart	Meg MaGrath	
1983 (37th)
1983 (37th)	Judith Ivey	Steaming	Josie	
1983 (37th)	Elizabeth Franz	Brighton Beach Memoirs	Kate Jerome	
1983 (37th)	Roxanne Hart	Passion	Kate	
1983 (37th)	Margaret Tyzack	All's Well That Ends Well	Countess of Rossillion	
1984 (38th)
1984 (38th)	Christine Baranski	The Real Thing	Charlotte	
1984 (38th)	Jo Henderson	Play Memory	Ruth MacMillan	
1984 (38th)	Dana Ivey	Heartbreak House	Lady Utterword	
1984 (38th)	Deborah Rush	Noises Off	Brooke Ashton	
1985 (39th)
1985 (39th)	Judith Ivey	Hurlyburly	Bonnie	
1985 (39th)	Joanna Gleason	A Day in the Death of Joe Egg	Pam	
1985 (39th)	Theresa Merritt	Ma Rainey's Black Bottom	Ma Rainey	
1985 (39th)	Sigourney Weaver	Hurlyburly	Darlene	
1986 (40th)
1986 (40th)	Swoosie Kurtz	The House of Blue Leaves	Bananas Shaughnessy	
1986 (40th)	Stockard Channing	The House of Blue Leaves	Bunny Flingus	
1986 (40th)	Bethel Leslie	Long Day's Journey into Night	Mary Tyrone	
1986 (40th)	Zoë Wanamaker	Loot	Fay	
1987 (41st)
1987 (41st)	Mary Alice	Fences	Rose Maxson	
1987 (41st)	Annette Bening	Coastal Disturbances	Holly Dancer	
1987 (41st)	Phyllis Newman	Broadway Bound	Blanche Morton	
1987 (41st)	Carole Shelley	Stepping Out	Maxine	
1988 (42nd)
1988 (42nd)	L. Scott Caldwell	Joe Turner's Come and Gone	Bertha Holly	
1988 (42nd)	Kimberleigh Aarn	Joe Turner's Come and Gone	Mattie Cambell	
1988 (42nd)	Kate Nelligan	Serious Money	Various Characters	
1988 (42nd)	Kimberly Scott	Joe Turner's Come and Gone	Molly Cunningham	
1989 (43rd)
1989 (43rd)	Christine Baranski	Rumors	Chris Gorman	
1989 (43rd)	Joanne Camp	The Heidi Chronicles	Various Characters	
1989 (43rd)	Tovah Feldshuh	Lend Me a Tenor	Maria Merelli	
1989 (43rd)	Penelope Ann Miller	Our Town	Emily Webb	

=== 1990s ===
Year	Actor	Project	Role(s)	Ref.
1990 (44th)
1990 (44th)	Margaret Tyzack	Lettice and Lovage	Lotte Schoen	
1990 (44th)	Polly Holliday	Cat on a Hot Tin Roof	Big Mama Pollitt	
1990 (44th)	S. Epatha Merkerson	The Piano Lesson	Berniece	
1990 (44th)	Lois Smith	The Grapes of Wrath	Ma Joad	
1991 (45th)
1991 (45th)	Irene Worth	Lost in Yonkers	Grandma Kurnitz	
1991 (45th)	Amelia Campbell	Our Country's Good	Various Characters	
1991 (45th)	Kathryn Erbe	The Speed of Darkness	Mary	
1991 (45th)	J. Smith-Cameron	Our Country's Good	Various Characters	
1992 (46th)
1992 (46th)	Brid Brennan	Dancing at Lughnasa	Agnes	
1992 (46th)	Rosaleen Linehan	Dancing at Lughnasa	Kate Mundy	
1992 (46th)	Cynthia Martells	Two Trains Running	Risa	
1992 (46th)	Dearbhla Molloy	Dancing at Lughnasa	Maggie Mundy	
1993 (47th)
1993 (47th)	Debra Monk	Redwood Curtain	Geneva	
1993 (47th)	Kathleen Chalfant	Angels in America: Millennium Approaches	Hannah Pitt, et al.	
1993 (47th)	Marcia Gay Harden	Angels in America: Millennium Approaches	Harper Pitt, et al.	
1993 (47th)	Anne Meara	Anna Christie	Marthy Owen	
1994 (48th)
1994 (48th)	Jane Adams	An Inspector Calls	Sheila Birling	
1994 (48th)	Debra Monk	Picnic	Rosemary Sydney	
1994 (48th)	Jeanne Paulson	The Kentucky Cycle	Various Characters	
1994 (48th)	Anne Pitoniak	Picnic	Helen Potts	
1995 (49th)
1995 (49th)	Frances Sternhagen	The Heiress	Lavinia Penniman	
1995 (49th)	Suzanne Bertish	The Molière Comedies	Lisette	
1995 (49th)	Cynthia Nixon	Indiscretions	Madeleine Ozeray	
1995 (49th)	Mercedes Ruehl	The Shadow Box	Beverly	
1996 (50th)
1996 (50th)	Audra McDonald	Master Class	Sharon Graham	
1996 (50th)	Viola Davis	Seven Guitars	Vera	
1996 (50th)	Michele Shay	Seven Guitars	Louise	
1996 (50th)	Lois Smith	Buried Child	Hallie	
1997 (51st)
1997 (51st)	Lynne Thigpen	An American Daughter	Dr. Judith B. Kaufman	
1997 (51st)	Helen Carey	London Assurance	Lady Gay Spanker	
1997 (51st)	Dana Ivey	The Last Night of Ballyhoo	Boo Levy	
1997 (51st)	Celia Weston	The Last Night of Ballyhoo	Reba Freitag	
1998 (52nd)
1998 (52nd)	Anna Manahan	The Beauty Queen of Leenane	Mags Folan	
1998 (52nd)	Enid Graham	Honour	Sophie	
1998 (52nd)	Linda Lavin	The Diary of Anne Frank	Petronella van Daan	
1998 (52nd)	Julyana Soelistyo	Golden Child	Eng Ahn	
1999 (53rd)
1999 (53rd)	Elizabeth Franz	Death of a Salesman	Linda Loman	
1999 (53rd)	Claire Bloom	Electra	Clytemnestra	
1999 (53rd)	Samantha Bond	Amy's View	Amy Thomas	
1999 (53rd)	Dawn Bradfield	The Lonesome West	Girleen Kelleher	

=== 2000s ===
Year	Actor	Project	Role(s)	Ref.
2000 (54th)
2000 (54th)	Blair Brown	Copenhagen	Margrethe Bohr	
2000 (54th)	Frances Conroy	The Ride Down Mt. Morgan	Theo	
2000 (54th)	Amy Ryan	Uncle Vanya	Sonya Serebryakova	
2000 (54th)	Helen Stenborg	Waiting in the Wings	Sarita Myrtle	
2000 (54th)	Sarah Woodward	The Real Thing	Charlotte	
2001 (55th)
2001 (55th)	Viola Davis	King Hedley II	Tonya	
2001 (55th)	Johanna Day	Proof	Claire	
2001 (55th)	Penny Fuller	The Dinner Party	Gabrielle Buonocelli	
2001 (55th)	Marthe Keller	Judgment at Nuremberg	Mme. Bertholt	
2001 (55th)	Michele Lee	The Tale of the Allergist's Wife	Lee Green	
2002 (56th)
2002 (56th)	Katie Finneran	Noises Off	Brooke Ashton	
2002 (56th)	Kate Burton	The Elephant Man	Madge Kendal	
2002 (56th)	Elizabeth Franz	Morning's at Seven	Aaronetta Gibbs	
2002 (56th)	Estelle Parsons	Morning's at Seven	Cora Swanson	
2002 (56th)	Frances Sternhagen	Morning's at Seven	Ida Bolton	
2003 (57th)
2003 (57th)	Michele Pawk	Hollywood Arms	Louise	
2003 (57th)	Christine Ebersole	Dinner at Eight	Toledo	
2003 (57th)	Linda Emond	Life x 3	Inez	
2003 (57th)	Kathryn Meisle	Tartuffe	Elmire	
2003 (57th)	Marian Seldes	Dinner at Eight	Carlotta Vance	
2004 (58th)
2004 (58th)	Audra McDonald	A Raisin in the Sun	Ruth Younger	
2004 (58th)	Essie Davis	Jumpers	Dotty	
2004 (58th)	Sanaa Lathan	A Raisin in the Sun	Beneatha Younger	
2004 (58th)	Margo Martindale	Cat on a Hot Tin Roof	Big Momma Pollitt	
2004 (58th)	Daphne Rubin-Vega	Anna in the Tropics	Conchita	
2005 (59th)
2005 (59th)	Adriane Lenox	Doubt	Mrs. Muller	
2005 (59th)	Mireille Enos	Who's Afraid of Virginia Woolf?	Honey	
2005 (59th)	Heather Goldenhersh	Doubt	Sister James	
2005 (59th)	Dana Ivey	The Rivals	Mrs. Malaprop	
2005 (59th)	Amy Ryan	A Streetcar Named Desire	Stella Kowalski	
2006 (60th)
2006 (60th)	Frances de la Tour	The History Boys	Mrs. Lintott	
2006 (60th)	Tyne Daly	Rabbit Hole	Nat	
2006 (60th)	Jayne Houdyshell	Well	Ann Kron	
2006 (60th)	Alison Pill	The Lieutenant of Inishmore	Mairead	
2006 (60th)	Zoë Wanamaker	Awake and Sing!	Bessie Berger	
2007 (61st)
2007 (61st)	Jennifer Ehle	The Coast of Utopia	Liubov / Natalie Herzen / Malwida von Meysenbug	
2007 (61st)	Xanthe Elbrick	Coram Boy	Young Alexander / Ashbrook / Aaron	
2007 (61st)	Dana Ivey	Butley	Edna Shaft	
2007 (61st)	Jan Maxwell	Coram Boy	Mrs. Lynch	
2007 (61st)	Martha Plimpton	The Coast of Utopia	Varenka / Natasha Tuchkov / Natasha Tuchkov Ogarev	
2008 (62nd)
2008 (62nd)	Rondi Reed	August: Osage County	Mattie Fae Aiken	
2008 (62nd)	Sinéad Cusack	Rock 'n' Roll	Eleanor	
2008 (62nd)	Mary McCormack	Boeing-Boeing	Gretchen	
2008 (62nd)	Laurie Metcalf	November	Clarice Bernstein	
2008 (62nd)	Martha Plimpton	Top Girls	Angie	
2009 (63rd)
2009 (63rd)	Angela Lansbury	Blithe Spirit	Madame Arcati	
2009 (63rd)	Hallie Foote	Dividing the Estate	Mary Jo Gordon	
2009 (63rd)	Jessica Hynes	The Norman Conquests	Annie	
2009 (63rd)	Marin Ireland	reasons to be pretty	Steph	
2009 (63rd)	Amanda Root	The Norman Conquests	Sarah	

=== 2010s ===
Year	Actor	Project	Role(s)	Ref.
2010 (64th)
2010 (64th)	Scarlett Johansson	A View from the Bridge	Catherine	
2010 (64th)	Maria Dizzia	In the Next Room (or The Vibrator Play)	Mrs. Daldry	
2010 (64th)	Rosemary Harris	The Royal Family	Fanny Cavendish	
2010 (64th)	Jessica Hecht	A View from the Bridge	Beatrice Carbone	
2010 (64th)	Jan Maxwell	Lend Me a Tenor	Maria Merelli	
2011 (65th)
2011 (65th)	Ellen Barkin	The Normal Heart	Dr. Emma Brookner	
2011 (65th)	Edie Falco	The House of Blue Leaves	Bananas Shaughnessy	
2011 (65th)	Judith Light	Lombardi	Marie Lombardi	
2011 (65th)	Joanna Lumley	La Bête	The Princess	
2011 (65th)	Elizabeth Rodriguez	The Motherfucker with the Hat	Veronica	
2012 (66th)
2012 (66th)	Judith Light	Other Desert Cities	Silda Grauman	
2012 (66th)	Linda Emond	Death of a Salesman	Linda Loman	
2012 (66th)	Spencer Kayden	Don't Dress for Dinner	Suzette	
2012 (66th)	Celia Keenan-Bolger	Peter and the Starcatcher	Molly Aster	
2012 (66th)	Condola Rashād	Stick Fly	Cheryl	
2013 (67th)
2013 (67th)	Judith Light	The Assembled Parties	Faye	
2013 (67th)	Carrie Coon	Who's Afraid of Virginia Woolf?	Honey	
2013 (67th)	Shalita Grant	Vanya and Sonia and Masha and Spike	Cassandra	
2013 (67th)	Judith Ivey	The Heiress	Lavinia Penniman	
2013 (67th)	Condola Rashad	The Trip to Bountiful	Thelma	
2014 (68th)
2014 (68th)	Sophie Okonedo	A Raisin in the Sun	Ruth Younger	
2014 (68th)	Sarah Greene	The Cripple of Inishmaan	Helen McCormack	
2014 (68th)	Celia Keenan-Bolger	The Glass Menagerie	Laura Wingfield	
2014 (68th)	Anika Noni Rose	A Raisin in the Sun	Beneatha Younger	
2014 (68th)	Mare Winningham	Casa Valentina	Rita	
2015 (69th)
2015 (69th)	Annaleigh Ashford	You Can't Take It with You	Essie Carmichael	
2015 (69th)	Patricia Clarkson	The Elephant Man	Madge Kendal	
2015 (69th)	Lydia Leonard	Wolf Hall Parts One & Two	Anne Boleyn	
2015 (69th)	Sarah Stiles	Hand to God	Jessica	
2015 (69th)	Julie White	Airline Highway	Tanya	
2016 (70th)
2016 (70th)	Jayne Houdyshell	The Humans	Deirdre Blake	
2016 (70th)	Pascale Armand	Eclipsed	Bessie	
2016 (70th)	Megan Hilty	Noises Off	Brooke Ashton	
2016 (70th)	Andrea Martin	Noises Off	Dotty Otley	
2016 (70th)	Saycon Sengbloh	Eclipsed	Helena	
2017 (71st)
2017 (71st)	Cynthia Nixon	The Little Foxes	Birdie Hubbard	
2017 (71st)	Johanna Day	Sweat	Tracey	
2017 (71st)	Jayne Houdyshell	A Doll's House, Part 2	Anne Marie	
2017 (71st)	Condola Rashād	A Doll's House, Part 2	Emmy Helmer	
2017 (71st)	Michelle Wilson	Sweat	Tracey	
2018 (72nd)
2018 (72nd)	Laurie Metcalf	Three Tall Women	B	
2018 (72nd)	Susan Brown	Angels in America	Hannah Pitt, et al.	
2018 (72nd)	Noma Dumezweni	Harry Potter and the Cursed Child	Hermione Granger	
2018 (72nd)	Deborah Findlay	The Children	Hazel	
2018 (72nd)	Denise Gough	Angels in America	Harper Pitt, et al.	
2019 (73rd)
2019 (73rd)	Celia Keenan-Bolger	To Kill a Mockingbird	Scout Finch	
2019 (73rd)	Fionnula Flanagan	The Ferryman	Aunt Maggie Far Away	
2019 (73rd)	Kristine Nielsen	Gary: A Sequel to Titus Andronicus	Janice	
2019 (73rd)	Julie White	Gary: A Sequel to Titus Andronicus	Carol	
2019 (73rd)	Ruth Wilson	King Lear	Cordelia / Fool	

=== 2020s ===
Year	Actor	Project	Role(s)	Ref.
2020 (74th)
2020 (74th)	Lois Smith	The Inheritance	Margaret	
2020 (74th)	Jane Alexander	Grand Horizons	Nancy	
2020 (74th)	Chalia La Tour	Slave Play	Teá	
2020 (74th)	Annie McNamara	Slave Play	Alana	
2020 (74th)	Cora Vander Broek	Linda Vista	Jules	
2022 (75th)
2022 (75th)	Phylicia Rashad	Skeleton Crew	Faye	
2022 (75th)	Uzo Aduba	Clyde's	Clyde	
2022 (75th)	Rachel Dratch	POTUS: Or, Behind Every Great Dumbass Are Seven Women Trying to Keep Him Alive	Stephanie	
2022 (75th)	Kenita R. Miller	for colored girls who have considered suicide / when the rainbow is enuf	Lady in Red	
2022 (75th)	Julie White	POTUS: Or, Behind Every Great Dumbass Are Seven Women Trying to Keep Him Alive	Harriet	
2022 (75th)	Kara Young	Clyde's	Letitia	
2023 (76th)
2023 (76th)	Miriam Silverman	The Sign in Sidney Brustein's Window	Mavis Parodus Bryson	
2023 (76th)	Nikki Crawford	Fat Ham	Tedra	
2023 (76th)	Crystal Lucas-Perry	Ain't No Mo'	Passenger #5	
2023 (76th)	Katy Sullivan	Cost of Living	Ani	
2023 (76th)	Kara Young	Cost of Living	Jessie	
2024 (77th)
2024 (77th)	Kara Young	Purlie Victorious	Lutiebelle Gussie Mae Jenkins	
2024 (77th)	Quincy Tyler Bernstine	Doubt: A Parable	Mrs. Muller	
2024 (77th)	Juliana Canfield	Stereophonic	Holly	
2024 (77th)	Celia Keenan-Bolger	Mother Play	Martha	
2024 (77th)	Sarah Pidgeon	Stereophonic	Diana	
2025 (78th)
2025 (78th)	Kara Young	Purpose	Aziza	
2025 (78th)	Tala Ashe	English	Elham	
2025 (78th)	Jessica Hecht	Eureka Day	Suzanne	
2025 (78th)	Marjan Neshat	English	Marjan	
2025 (78th)	Fina Strazza	John Proctor Is the Villain	Beth Powell	
2026 (79th)
2026 (79th)	Laurie Metcalf	Death of a Salesman	Linda Loman	
2026 (79th)	Betsy Aidem	Liberation	Margie	
2026 (79th)	Marylouise Burke	The Balusters	Penny Bewell	
2026 (79th)	Aya Cash	Giant	Jessie Stone	
2026 (79th)	June Squibb	Marjorie Prime	Marjorie Prime	

== Most wins ==
2 wins

- Christine Baranski
- Judith Ivey
- Swoosie Kurtz
- Judith Light (consecutive)
- Laurie Metcalf
- Audra McDonald
- Frances Sternhagen
- Kara Young (consecutive)

== Most nominations ==
5 nominations

- Frances Sternhagen

4 nominations

- Dana Ivey
- Celia Keenan-Bolger
- Kara Young (consecutive)

3 nominations

- Elizabeth Franz
- Eileen Heckart
- Jayne Houdyshell
- Judith Ivey
- Swoosie Kurtz
- Judith Light (consecutive)
- Laurie Metcalf
- Condola Rashad
- Marian Seldes
- Lois Smith
- Zoë Wanamaker
- Julie White

2 nominations

- Jane Alexander
- Rae Allen
- Christine Baranski
- Leora Dana
- Viola Davis
- Johanna Day
- Linda Emond
- Fionnula Flanagan
- Alice Ghostley
- Jessica Hecht
- Mary Beth Hurt
- Zohra Lampert
- Linda Lavin
- Anna Manahan
- Jan Maxwell
- Audra McDonald
- Debra Monk
- Rosemary Murphy
- Cynthia Nixon
- Martha Plimpton
- Amy Ryan
- Carole Shelley
- Maureen Stapleton
- Margaret Tyzack

== Character win total ==
2 wins

- Linda Loman from Death of a Salesman
- Mavis Parodus Bryson from The Sign in Sidney Brustein's Window
- Ruth Younger from A Raisin in the Sun

== Character nomination total ==
3 nominations

- Brooke Ashton from Noises Off
- Honey from Who's Afraid of Virginia Woolf?
- Linda Loman from Death of a Salesman
- Mavis Parodus Bryson from The Sign in Sidney Brustein's Window

2 nominations

- Bananas Shaughnessy from The House of Blue Leaves
- Beneatha Younger from A Raisin in the Sun
- Beverly from The Shadow Box
- Big Mama Pollitt from Cat on a Hot Tin Roof
- Birdie Hubbard from The Little Foxes
- Charlotte from The Real Thing
- Hannah Pitt (and others) from Angels in America
- Harper Pitt (and others) from Angels in America
- Lady Gay Spanker from London Assurance
- Lady in Red from For Colored Girls Who Have Considered Suicide / When the Rainbow Is Enuf
- Lavinia Penniman from The Heiress
- Madge Kendal from The Elephant Man
- Maria Merelli from Lend Me a Tenor
- Marthy Owen from Anna Christie
- Mrs. Muller from Doubt
- Ruth Younger from A Raisin in the Sun

== Productions with multiple featured nominations ==
boldface=Winner

- Separate Tables – Beryl Measor and Phyllis Neilson-Terry
- Butterflies Are Free – **Blythe Danner** and Eileen Heckart
- Absurd Person Singular – Geraldine Page and Carole Shelley
- The Shadow Box – Patricia Elliott and Rose Gregorio
- Bedroom Farce – **Joan Hickson** and Susan Littler
- Crimes of the Heart – Mia Dillon and Mary Beth Hurt
- Hurlyburly – **Judith Ivey** and Sigourney Weaver
- The House of Blue Leaves – Stockard Channing and **Swoosie Kurtz**
- Joe Turner's Come and Gone – Kimberleigh Aarn, **L. Scott Caldwell** and Kimberly Scott
- Our Country's Good – Amelia Campbell and J. Smith-Cameron
- Angels in America: Millennium Approaches – Kathleen Chalfant and Marcia Gay Harden
- Dancing at Lughnasa – **Brid Brennan**, Rosaleen Linehan and Dearbhla Molloy
- Picnic – Debra Monk and Anne Pitoniak
- Seven Guitars – Viola Davis and Michele Shay
- The Last Night of Ballyhoo – Dana Ivey and Celia Weston
- Morning's at Seven – Elizabeth Franz, Estelle Parsons and Frances Sternhagen
- Dinner at Eight – Christine Ebersole and Marian Seldes
- A Raisin in the Sun – Sanaa Lathan and **Audra McDonald**
- Doubt: A Parable – Heather Goldenhersh and **Adriane Lenox**
- The Coast of Utopia – **Jennifer Ehle** and Martha Plimpton
- The Norman Conquests – Jessica Hynes and Amanda Root
- A View from the Bridge – Jessica Hecht and **Scarlett Johansson**
- A Raisin in the Sun – **Sophie Okonedo** and Anika Noni Rose
- Noises Off – Megan Hilty and Andrea Martin
- A Doll's House, Part 2 – Jayne Houdyshell and Condola Rashad (Nominated the same year as Sweat)
- Sweat – Johanna Day and Michelle Wilson (Nominated the same year as A Doll's House, Part 2)
- Angels in America – Susan Brown and Denise Gough
- Gary: A Sequel to Titus Andronicus - Kristine Nielsen and Julie White
- Slave Play – Chalia La Tour and Annie McNamara
- Clyde's – Uzo Aduba and Kara Young
- POTUS: Or, Behind Every Great Dumbass Are Seven Women Trying to Keep Him Alive – Rachel Dratch and Julie White (Both this and Clyde's were nominated the same year)
- Cost of Living – Katy Sullivan and Kara Young
- Stereophonic – Juliana Canfield and Sarah Pidgeon
- English – Tala Ashe and Marjan Neshat

== Multiple awards and nominations ==
Actresses who have been nominated multiple times in any acting categories

Awards	Nominations	Recipient
6	11	Audra McDonald
5	10	Julie Harris
5	7	Angela Lansbury
4	6	Gwen Verdon
4	4	Zoe Caldwell
3	8	Patti LuPone
3	7	Laurie Metcalf
3	5	Irene Worth
3	5	Jessica Tandy
3	4	Glenn Close
3	4	Mary Martin
3	3	Shirley Booth
2	10	Chita Rivera
2	8	Colleen Dewhurst
2	7	Bernadette Peters
2	7	Frances Sternhagen
2	7	Sutton Foster
2	6	Andrea Martin
2	6	Maureen Stapleton
2	5	Victoria Clark
2	5	Cherry Jones
2	5	Donna Murphy
2	5	Mary-Louise Parker
2	5	Swoosie Kurtz
2	4	Christine Ebersole
2	4	Cynthia Nixon
2	4	Judith Ivey
2	4	Judy Kaye
2	4	Kara Young
2	4	Margaret Leighton
2	3	Anne Bancroft
2	3	Bebe Neuwirth
2	3	Helen Gallagher
2	3	Helen Hayes
2	3	Jennifer Ehle
2	3	Judith Light
2	3	Liza Minnelli
2	3	Phylicia Rashad
2	3	Viola Davis
2	2	Christine Baranski
2	2	Katie Finneran
2	2	Lauren Bacall
2	2	Sandy Dennis
2	2	Tammy Grimes
2	2	Uta Hagen
1
1	9	Kelli O'Hara
1	9	Rosemary Harris
1	8	Jane Alexander
1	7	Stockard Channing
1	6	Linda Lavin
1	5	Celia Keenan-Bolger
1	5	Glenda Jackson
1	5	Jayne Houdyshell
1	5	Laura Benanti
1	5	Marian Seldes
1	4	Blythe Danner
1	4	Carol Channing
1	4	Carole Shelley
1	4	Debra Monk
1	4	Diana Rigg
1	4	Faith Prince
1	4	Jessie Mueller
1	4	Julie White
1	4	Karen Ziemba
1	4	LaChanze
1	4	Madeline Kahn
1	3	Amanda Plummer
1	3	Annaleigh Ashford
1	3	Barbara Harris
1	3	Beth Leavel
1	3	Dorothy Loudon
1	3	Elizabeth Ashley
1	3	Elizabeth Franz
1	3	Ethel Merman
1	3	Helen Mirren
1	3	Idina Menzel
1	3	Jane Krakowski
1	3	Janet McTeer
1	3	Joanna Gleason
1	3	Kristin Chenoweth
1	3	Lois Smith
1	3	Maggie Smith
1	3	Mercedes Ruehl
1	3	Rae Allen
1	3	Shoshana Bean
1	3	Stephanie J. Block
1	3	Tonya Pinkins
1	3	Tyne Daly
1	3	Vanessa Redgrave
1	2	Adriane Lenox
1	2	Adrienne Warren
1	2	Alexis Smith
1	2	Alice Ghostly
1	2	Alice Ripley
1	2	Anika Noni Rose
1	2	Anna Manahan
1	2	Barbara Cook
1	2	Betty Buckley
1	2	Cady Huffman
1	2	Dolores Gray
1	2	Frances McDormand
1	2	Gretha Boston
1	2	Jessica Lange
1	2	Jo Van Fleet
1	2	Joan Allen
1	2	Joaquina Kalukango
1	2	Judith Anderson
1	2	Karen Olivo
1	2	Leora Dana
1	2	Leslie Uggams
1	2	Liliane Montevecchi
1	2	Lillias White
1	2	Linda Hopkins
1	2	Lindsay Duncan
1	2	Lindsay Mendez
1	2	Lotte Lenya
1	2	Lynne Thigpen
1	2	Marcia Gay Harden
1	2	Margaret Tyzack
1	2	Maria Karnilova
1	2	Mary Alice
1	2	Maryann Plunkett
1	2	Mary Louise Wilson
1	2	Nanette Fabray
1	2	Natasha Richardson
1	2	Nikki M. James
1	2	Nina Arianda
1	2	Patina Miller
1	2	Patricia Elliott
1	2	Patsy Kelly
1	2	Phyllis Newman
1	2	Priscilla Lopez
1	2	Randy Graff
1	2	Rosalind Russell
1	2	Ruthie Ann Miles
1	2	Shirley Knight
1	2	Sophie Okonedo

Nominations	Recipient
5	Dana Ivey
5	Laura Linney
5	Estelle Parsons
5	Jan Maxwell
4	Condola Rashad
4	Eileen Atkins
4	Elaine Stritch
4	Geraldine Page
4	Judy Kuhn
4	Kate Nelligan
4	Tovah Feldshuh
4	Zoë Wanamaker
3	Amy Ryan
3	Brenda Vaccaro
3	Carolee Carmello
3	Dee Hoty
3	Eileen Heckart
3	Jennifer Simard
3	Jessica Hecht
3	Julie Andrews
3	Kate Burton
3	Linda Emond
3	Louise Troy
3	Lynn Redgrave
3	Marin Mazzie
3	Martha Plimpton
3	Mary Beth Hurt
3	Mary Testa
3	Rebecca Luker
3	Rosemary Murphy
3	Sandy Duncan
2	Alison Fraser
2	Allison Janney
2	Amy Morton
2	Ann Reinking
2	Anne Pitoniak
2	Annette Bening
2	Barbara Bel Geddes
2	Barbra Streisand
2	Beatrice Lillie
2	Beth Fowler
2	Betsy Aidem
2	Carmen Cusack
2	Carol Burnett
2	Carrie Coon
2	Charlotte d'Amboise
2	Charlotte Rae
2	Christine Andreas
2	Claudia McNeil
2	Crista Moore
2	Daphne Rubin-Vega
2	Debbie Allen
2	Diana Sands
2	Eartha Kitt
2	Elizabeth Allen
2	Ernestine Jackson
2	Eva Noblezada
2	Eve Best
2	Fionnula Flanagan
2	Georgia Brown
2	Gladys Cooper
2	Inga Swenson
2	Jane Fonda
2	Jayne Atkinson
2	Johanna Day
2	Josephine Premice
2	Josie de Guzman
2	Julienne Marie
2	Kate Baldwin
2	Kate Reid
2	Katharine Hepburn
2	Kathleen Turner
2	Kim Stanley
2	Kristine Nielsen
2	LaTanya Richardson Jackson
2	Laura Donnelly
2	Laura Osnes
2	Leland Palmer
2	Liv Ullmann
2	Marcia Lewis
2	Mare Winningham
2	Mary Beth Peil
2	Megan Hilty
2	Michele Lee
2	Mildred Natwick
2	Millicent Martin
2	Nancy Dussault
2	Nancy Walker
2	Penny Fuller
2	Pert Kelton
2	Rachel Dratch
2	Ruth Wilson
2	S. Epatha Merkerson
2	Sarah Stiles
2	Sherie Rene Scott
2	Sinéad Cusack
2	Siobhán McKenna
2	Spencer Kayden
2	Susan Browning
2	Tammy Blanchard
2	Vivian Reed
2	Zohra Lampert

== Trivia ==
- Supporting actresses in two of three plays in Neil Simon's Eugene trilogy (Brighton Beach Memoirs and Broadway Bound) were nominated for the Tony.
- Featured actresses in six parts of August Wilson's The Pittsburgh Cycle have been nominated for the award.
- Featured actress Trazana Beverley in Ntozake Shange's For Colored Girls Who Have Considered Suicide / When the Rainbow Is Enuf is the first African American actor to receive the award.
- Kara Young was the first African-American actress to be nominated four consecutive times (2022, 2023, 2024, 2025).
- Kara Young was the first African-American actress win consecutive Tonys, and second to win consecutively for this award after Judith Light.

== See also ==
- Dorian Award for Outstanding Featured Performance in a Broadway Play
- Drama Desk Award for Outstanding Featured Actress in a Play
- Drama Desk Award for Outstanding Featured Performance in a Play
- Drama League Award for Distinguished Performance
- Laurence Olivier Award for Best Actress in a Supporting Role
- Lists of acting awards
- List of awards for supporting actor
- Outer Critics Circle Award for Outstanding Featured Performer in a Broadway Play
