= List of Tony Award-nominated productions =

This is a list of Tony Award–nominated productions.

== Glossary and legend ==
If a theatrical production won the Tony Award for Best Play, Tony Award for Best Musical, Tony Award for Best Revival of a Play, Tony Award for Best Revival of a Musical or the Tony Award for Best Revival its entry is listed in a shaded background with a boldface title.

Competitive Tonys are separated from non-competitive Tonys; as such, any productions that were awarded a non-competitive award will be shown in brackets next to the number of competitive wins.

indicates Best Play winner.
indicates Best Play Revival winner.
indicates Best Musical winner.
indicates Best Musical Revival winner.
indicates Best Revival winner.

== List ==
Production	Year	Awards	Nominations	Ref.
All My Sons	1947	1 (1)	1	
Another Part of the Forest	1947	2	2	
Brigadoon	1947	1	1	
Cyrano de Bergerac	1947	1	1	
Finian's Rainbow	1947	2	2	
Happy Birthday	1947	2	2	
Joan of Lorraine	1947	1	1	
John Loves Mary	1947	1	1	
Street Scene	1947	2	2	
The Chocolate Soldier	1947	1	1	
Years Ago	1947	1	1	
**Mister Roberts**	1948	3	3	
A Streetcar Named Desire	1948	1	1	
Angel in the Wings	1948	2	2	
Antony and Cleopatra	1948	1	1	
Command Decision	1948	2	2	
Finian's Rainbow	1948	1	1	
For Love or Money	1948	1	1	
High Button Shoes	1948	1	1	
Medea	1948	1	1	
The Heiress	1948	2	2	
The Importance of Being Earnest	1948	1 (1)	1	
The Medium	1948	1	1	
Annie Get Your Gun	1948	0 (1)	0	
Harvey	1948	0 (1)	0	
**Death of a Salesman**	1949	6	6	
**Kiss Me, Kate**	1949	5	5	
Anne of the Thousand Days	1949	2	2	
As the Girls Go	1949	1	1	
Goodbye, My Fancy	1949	1	1	
Lend an Ear	1949	1	1	
Love Life	1949	1	1	
Sleepy Hollow	1949	1	1	
South Pacific	1949	1	1	
Summer and Smoke	1949	1	1	
The Madwoman of Chaillot	1949	1	1	
Where's Charley?	1949	1	1	
**The Cocktail Party**	1950	1	1	
**South Pacific**	1950	9	9	
Come Back, Little Sheba	1950	2	2	
Regina	1950	2	2	
The Innocents	1950	1	1	
Touch and Go	1950	1	1	
Miss Liberty	1950	0 (1)	0	
**The Rose Tattoo**	1951	4	4	
**Guys and Dolls**	1951	5	5	
Bless You All	1951	1	1	
Call Me Madam	1951	3	3	
Darkness at Noon	1951	1	1	
Season In The Sun	1951	1	1	
The Autumn Garden	1951	1	1	
The Consul	1951	1	1	
The Country Girl	1951	2	2	
**The Fourposter**	1952	2	2	
**The King and I**	1952	5	5	
Call Me Madam	1952	1	1	
I Am a Camera	1952	2	2	
Pal Joey	1952	3	3	
Point of No Return	1952	1	1	
The Shrike	1952	2	2	
Top Banana	1952	1	1	
Don Juan in Hell	1952	0 (1)	0	
**The Crucible**	1953	2	2	
**Wonderful Town**	1953	5	5	
Dial M for Murder	1953	1	1	
Hazel Flagg	1953	2	2	
Picnic	1953	1	1	
The Seven Year Itch	1953	1	1	
The Time of the Cuckoo	1953	1	1	
Two's Company	1953	1	1	
Wish You Were Here	1953	2	2	
**The Teahouse of the August Moon**	1954	3	3	
**Kismet**	1954	3	3	
John Murray Anderson's Almanac	1954	1	1	
Can-Can	1954	2	2	
Carnival in Flanders	1954	1	1	
Ondine	1954	4	4	
Picnic	1954	1	1	
Tea and Sympathy	1954	1	1	
The Trip to Bountiful	1954	1	1	
**The Desperate Hours**	1955	2	2	
**The Pajama Game**	1955	3	3	
Fanny	1955	1	1	
House of Flowers	1955	1	1	
Peter Pan	1955	3	3	
Quadrille	1955	2	2	
The Bad Seed	1955	1	1	
The Saint of Bleecker Street	1955	1	1	
Witness for the Prosecution	1955	2	2	
**The Diary of Anne Frank**	1956	1	5	
**Damn Yankees**	1956	7	9	
A Hatful of Rain	1956	0	2	
A View from the Bridge	1956	0	2	
Bus Stop	1956	0	4	
Cat on a Hot Tin Roof	1956	0	4	
Catch a Star!	1956	0	1	
Finian's Rainbow	1956	0	1	
Heavenly Twins	1956	0	1	
Inherit the Wind	1956	3	4	
Middle of the Night	1956	1	5	
No Time for Sergeants	1956	1	2	
Once Upon a Tailor	1956	0	1	
Phoenix '55	1956	0	3	
Pipe Dream	1956	1	9	
Porgy and Bess	1956	0	1	
Red Roses for Me	1956	0	1	
Six Characters in Search of an Author	1956	0	1	
Someone Waiting	1956	0	1	
Tamburlaine the Great	1956	0	2	
The Chalk Garden	1956	0	5	
The Great Sebastians	1956	0	2	
The Honeys	1956	0	1	
The Lark	1956	1	5	
The Matchmaker	1956	1	2	
The Ponder Heart	1956	1	3	
The Threepenny Opera	1956	1 (1)	2	
The Vamp	1956	0	3	
Tiger at the Gates	1956	0	4	
**Long Day's Journey Into Night**	1957	2	6	
**My Fair Lady**	1957	6	10	
A Clearing in the Woods	1957	0	2	
A Hole in the Head	1957	0	1	
Auntie Mame	1957	1	4	
Bells Are Ringing	1957	2	4	
Candide	1957	0	5	
Eugenia	1957	0	1	
Happy Hunting	1957	0	4	
Li'l Abner	1957	2	3	
Little Glass Clock	1957	0	1	
Major Barbara	1957	0	3	
Separate Tables	1957	1	7	
Shangri-La	1957	0	1	
Small War on Murray Hill	1957	0	2	
The Apple Cart	1957	0	1	
The Happiest Millionaire	1957	0	2	
The Most Happy Fella	1957	0	6	
The Potting Shed	1957	1	3	
The Reluctant Debutante	1957	0	2	
The Sleeping Prince	1957	0	1	
The Waltz of the Toreadors	1957	0	5	
Too Late the Phalarope	1957	0	2	
Visit to a Small Planet	1957	0	3	
**Sunrise at Campobello**	1958	4	5	
**The Music Man**	1958	5	9	
A Boy Growing Up	1958	0	1	
A Hole in the Head	1958	0	1	
A Moon for the Misbegotten	1958	0	1	
Blue Denim	1958	0	1	
Brigadoon	1958	0	1	
Carousel	1958	0	1	
Compulsion	1958	0	1	
Good as Gold	1958	0	1	
Jamaica	1958	0	7	
Look Back in Anger	1958	0	3	
Look Homeward, Angel	1958	0	7	
Miss Isobel	1958	0	1	
Miss Lonelyhearts	1958	0	1	
New Girl in Town	1958	2	5	
Nude with Violin	1958	0	1	
Oh, Captain!	1958	0	6	
Orpheus Descending	1958	0	2	
Romanoff and Juliet	1958	0	2	
Rumple	1958	0	1	
Shinbone Alley	1958	0	1	
The Cave Dwellers	1958	0	1	
The Country Wife	1958	0	1	
The Dark at the Top of the Stairs	1958	0	5	
The Day the Money Stopped	1958	0	1	
The Entertainer	1958	0	3	
The First Gentleman	1958	1	1	
The Rope Dancers	1958	0	6	
The Square Root of Wonderful	1958	0	1	
Time Remembered	1958	2	7	
Two for the Seesaw	1958	1	3	
West Side Story	1958	2	6	
Ziegfeld Follies	1958	0	1	
**J.B.**	1959	2	5	
**Redhead**	1959	6	7	
A Majority of One	1959	2	4	
A Touch of the Poet	1959	0	2	
Ages of Man	1959	0 (1)	0	
Comes a Day	1959	0	1	
Epitaph for George Dillon	1959	0	3	
Flower Drum Song	1959	1	6	
God and Kate Murphy	1959	0	1	
Goldilocks	1959	2	5	
Jane Eyre	1959	0	1	
La Plume de Ma Tante	1959	0 (1)	3	
Once More, with Feeling!	1959	0	1	
Rashomon	1959	0	3	
Requiem for a Nun	1959	0	1	
Say, Darling	1959	0	1	
Tall Story	1959	0	1	
The Cold Wind and the Warm	1959	0	1	
The Disenchanted	1959	1	3	
The Legend of Lizzie	1959	0	1	
The Marriage-Go-Round	1959	1	2	
The Most Happy Fella	1959	0	1	
The Music Man	1959	1	1	
The Pleasure of His Company	1959	1	4	
The Visit	1959	0	5	
The World of Suzie Wong	1959	0	1	
Who Was That Lady I Saw You With?	1959	0	1	
Whoop-Up	1959	0	2	
**The Miracle Worker**	1960	4	5	
**Fiorello!**	1960	3	7	
**The Sound of Music**	1960	5	9	
A Loss of Roses	1960	0	1	
A Raisin in the Sun	1960	0	4	
A Thurber Carnival	1960	0 (1)	0	
Caligula	1960	0	1	
Destry Rides Again	1960	1	4	
Five Finger Exercise	1960	0	1	
Goodbye Charlie	1960	0	1	
Greenwillow	1960	0	7	
Gypsy	1960	0	8	
Happy Town	1960	0	1	
Much Ado About Nothing	1960	0	1	
Once Upon a Mattress	1960	0	2	
One More River	1960	0	1	
Saratoga	1960	1	2	
Sweet Bird of Youth	1960	0	3	
Take Me Along	1960	1	10	
The Andersonville Trial	1960	0	1	
The Best Man	1960	1	6	
The Fighting Cock	1960	1	1	
The Long Dream	1960	0	1	
The Tenth Man	1960	0	3	
There Was a Little Girl	1960	0	1	
Toys in the Attic	1960	2	6	
**Becket**	1961	4	5	
**Bye Bye Birdie**	1961	4	8	
13 Daughters	1961	0	2	
A Taste of Honey	1961	1	1	
Advise and Consent	1961	0	1	
All the Way Home	1961	1	5	
Big Fish, Little Fish	1961	2	4	
Camelot	1961	4	5	
Do Re Mi	1961	0	5	
Duel of Angels	1961	0	1	
Invitation to a March	1961	0	1	
Irma La Douce	1961	1	7	
Mary, Mary	1961	0	1	
Midgie Purvis	1961	0	1	
Period of Adjustment	1961	0	2	
Rape of the Belt	1961	0	1	
Rhinocéros	1961	1	2	
Show Girl	1961	0	1	
Tenderloin	1961	0	3	
The Devil's Advocate	1961	0	6	
The Hostage	1961	0	2	
The Unsinkable Molly Brown	1961	1	1	
**A Man for All Seasons**	1962	4	4	
**How to Succeed in Business Without Really Trying**	1962	7	8	
A Far Country	1962	0	1	
A Gift of Time	1962	0	1	
A Passage to India	1962	0	2	
A Shot in the Dark	1962	1	1	
All American	1962	0	2	
Carnival!	1962	2	7	
Daughter of Silence	1962	0	1	
From the Second City	1962	0	2	
Gideon	1962	0	4	
Great Day in the Morning	1962	0	2	
I Can Get It for You Wholesale	1962	0	1	
Kean	1962	0	2	
Kwamina	1962	0	3	
Look We've Come Through	1962	0	1	
Milk and Honey	1962	0	5	
No Strings	1962	3	9	
Purlie Victorious	1962	0	1	
Romeo and Juliet	1962	0 (1)	0	
Ross	1962	0	3	
Sail Away	1962	0	2	
Subways Are for Sleeping	1962	1	3	
Sunday in New York	1962	0	1	
Take Her, She's Mine	1962	1	1	
The Caretaker	1962	0	3	
The Gay Life	1962	1	4	
The Happiest Girl in the World	1962	0	1	
The Night of the Iguana	1962	1	3	
**Who's Afraid of Virginia Woolf?**	1963	5	6	
**A Funny Thing Happened on the Way to the Forum**	1963	6	8	
A Thousand Clowns	1963	1	3	
Beyond the Fringe	1963	0 (1)	1	
Bravo Giovanni	1963	0	3	
Brigadoon	1963	0	3	
Enter Laughing	1963	1	1	
Little Me	1963	1	10	
Lord Pengo	1963	0	1	
Mother Courage and Her Children	1963	0	4	
Mr. President	1963	1	3	
Never Too Late	1963	0	2	
Oliver!	1963	3	10	
Photo Finish	1963	0	1	
Stop the World - I Want to Get Off	1963	1	5	
Strange Interlude	1963	0	1	
Tchin-Tchin	1963	0	4	
The Beauty Part	1963	0	2	
The Lady of the Camellias	1963	0	3	
The Milk Train Doesn't Stop Here Anymore	1963	0	1	
The School for Scandal	1963	1	3	
Tiger, Tiger Burning Bright	1963	0	1	
Too True to Be Good	1963	0	1	
Tovarich	1963	1	2	
**Luther**	1964	1	2	
**Hello, Dolly!**	1964	10	11	
110 in the Shade	1964	0	4	
A Case of Libel	1964	0	1	
After the Fall	1964	1	2	
Any Wednesday	1964	1	2	
Anyone Can Whistle	1964	0	1	
Barefoot in the Park	1964	1	4	
Blues for Mister Charlie	1964	0	1	
Dylan	1964	1	4	
Foxy	1964	1	2	
Funny Girl	1964	0	8	
Hamlet	1964	1	2	
High Spirits	1964	0	8	
Marathon '33	1964	0	3	
Marco Millions	1964	0	2	
Pal Joey	1964	0	1	
She Loves Me	1964	1	5	
The Ballad of the Sad Café	1964	0	6	
The Deputy	1964	1	2	
The Girl Who Came to Supper	1964	1	3	
The Resistible Rise of Arturo Ui	1964	0	1	
The Student Gypsy, or The Prince of Liederkranz	1964	0	1	
West Side Story	1964	0	2	
What Makes Sammy Run?	1964	0	2	
**The Subject Was Roses**	1965	2	5	
**Fiddler on the Roof**	1965	9 (1)	10	
Absence of a Cello	1965	0	1	
All in Good Time	1965	0	2	
Bajour	1965	0	2	
Baker Street	1965	1	4	
Ben Franklin in Paris	1965	0	1	
Do I Hear a Waltz?	1965	0	3	
Fade Out - Fade In	1965	0	1	
Flora the Red Menace	1965	1	1	
Golden Boy	1965	0	4	
Guys and Dolls	1965	0	1	
Half a Sixpence	1965	0	9	
Hughie	1965	0	1	
I Had a Ball	1965	0	1	
Incident at Vichy	1965	0	1	
Luv	1965	3	5	
Oh, What a Lovely War!	1965	1	4	
Poor Bitos	1965	0	1	
Slow Dance on the Killing Ground	1965	0	3	
Tartuffe	1965	0	3	
The Amen Corner	1965	0	1	
The Odd Couple	1965	4	5	
The Owl and the Pussycat	1965	0	1	
The Roar of the Greasepaint - The Smell of the Crowd	1965	0	6	
The Sign in Sidney Brustein's Window	1965	1	1	
Tiny Alice	1965	1	6	
Traveller Without Luggage	1965	0	1	
**Marat/Sade**	1966	4	5	
**Man of La Mancha**	1966	5	6	
Anya	1966	0	1	
Cactus Flower	1966	0	2	
Drat! The Cat!	1966	0	1	
Entertaining Mr. Sloane	1966	0	1	
Generation	1966	0	1	
Inadmissible Evidence	1966	0	2	
It's a Bird... It's a Plane... It's Superman	1966	0	3	
Ivanov	1966	0	1	
Mame	1966	3	8	
Mark Twain Tonight	1966	1	1	
On a Clear Day You Can See Forever	1966	0	3	
Philadelphia, Here I Come!	1966	0	5	
Pickwick	1966	0	3	
Skyscraper	1966	0	5	
Slapstick Tragedy	1966	1	2	
Sweet Charity	1966	1	9	
The Lion in Winter	1966	1	2	
The Right Honourable Gentleman	1966	0	2	
Wait Until Dark	1966	0	1	
You Can't Take It with You	1966	0	1	
**The Homecoming**	1967	4	6	
**Cabaret**	1967	8	11	
A Delicate Balanace	1967	1	5	
A Hand Is on the Gate	1967	0	2	
A Joyful Noise	1967	0	3	
Annie Get Your Gun	1967	0	2	
Black Comedy	1967	0	5	
I Do! I Do!	1967	1	7	
Marat/Sade	1967	0	2	
Right You Are (If You Think You Are)	1967	0	1	
The Apple Tree	1967	1	7	
The Killing of Sister George	1967	1	3	
The Loves of Cass McGuire	1967	0	1	
The Rose Tattoo	1967	0	1	
The School for Scandal	1967	0	2	
The Wild Duck	1967	0	3	
Walking Happy	1967	0	6	
**Rosencrantz and Guildenstern Are Dead**	1968	4	8	
**Hallelujah, Baby!**	1968	5	9	
A Day in the Death of Joe Egg	1968	1	4	
Darling of the Day	1968	1	1	
Golden Rainbow	1968	0	2	
Henry, Sweet Henry	1968	0	2	
How Now, Dow Jones	1968	1	6	
I Never Sang for My Father	1968	0	1	
Illya Darling	1968	0	6	
More Stately Mansions	1968	0	2	
Plaza Suite	1968	1	3	
Portrait of a Queen	1968	0	1	
Spofford	1968	0	1	
Staircase	1968	0	1	
The Birthday Party	1968	1	2	
The Grand Music Hall of Israel	1968	0	1	
The Happy Time	1968	3	10	
The Price	1968	0	2	
The Prime of Miss Jean Brodie	1968	1	1	
Weekend	1968	0	1	
You Know I Can't Hear You When the Water's Running	1968	1	2	
**The Great White Hope**	1969	3	3	
**1776**	1969	3	6	
Canterbury Tales	1969	1	4	
Dear World	1969	1	2	
Does a Tiger Wear a Necktie?	1969	1	3	
Forty Carats	1969	1	1	
George M!	1969	1	2	
Hadrian the Seventh	1969	1	5	
Hair	1969	0	2	
Lovers	1969	0	3	
Lovers and Other Strangers	1969	0	1	
Maggie Flynn	1969	0	1	
Morning, Noon and Night	1969	0	2	
Play It Again, Sam	1969	0	3	
Promises, Promises	1969	2	8	
The Fig Leaves Are Falling	1969	0	1	
The Goodbye People	1969	0	1	
The Man in the Glass Booth	1969	0	3	
The Seven Descents of Myrtle	1969	0	1	
Zorba	1969	1	8	
**Borstal Boy**	1970	1	3	
**Applause**	1970	4	11	
A Patriot for Me	1970	0	2	
Billy	1970	0	2	
Brightower	1970	0	1	
Butterflies Are Free	1970	1	3	
Child's Play	1970	5	6	
Coco	1970	2	7	
Cry for Us All	1970	0	2	
Georgy	1970	0	2	
Harvey	1970	0	1	
Indians	1970	0	3	
Jimmy	1970	0	1	
Last of the Red Hot Lovers	1970	0	4	
Private Lives	1970	1	1	
Purlie	1970	2	5	
The Chinese and Dr. Fish	1970	0	2	
**Sleuth**	1971	1	3	
**Company**	1971	6	14	
A Midsummer Night's Dream	1971	1	2	
Abelard and Heloise	1971	0	2	
And Miss Reardon Drinks A Little	1971	1	2	
Conduct Unbecoming	1971	0	1	
Father's Day	1971	0	2	
Hay Fever	1971	0	1	
Home	1971	0	5	
Les Blancs	1971	0	2	
Lovely Ladies, Kind Gentlemen	1971	0	2	
No, No, Nanette	1971	4	6	
Paul Sills' Story Theatre	1971	2	3	
The Boy Friend	1971	0	1	
The Gingerbread Lady	1971	1	1	
The Me Nobody Knows	1971	0	5	
The Philanthropist	1971	0	3	
The Rothschilds	1971	2	9	
The School for Wives	1971	1	3	
Two by Two	1971	0	1	
**Sticks and Bones**	1972	2	4	
**Two Gentlemen of Verona**	1972	2	9	
70, Girls, 70	1972	0	1	
A Funny Thing Happened on the Way to the Forum	1972	2	3	
Ain't Supposed to Die a Natural Death	1972	0	7	
All Over	1972	0	1	
Follies	1972	7	11	
Grease	1972	0	7	
Inner City	1972	1	1	
Jesus Christ Superstar	1972	0	5	
Lenny	1972	1	2	
Moonchildren	1972	0	1	
Old Times	1972	0	5	
On the Town	1972	0	1	
The Country Girl	1972	0	1	
The Love Suicide at Schofield Barracks	1972	0	1	
The Prisoner of Second Avenue	1972	2	3	
The Sign in Sidney Brustein's Window	1972	0	1	
The Trial of the Catonsville Nine	1972	0	1	
Twigs	1972	1	1	
Vivat! Vivat Regina!	1972	0	4	
Wise Child	1972	0	1	
**That Championship Season**	1973	2	5	
**A Little Night Music**	1973	6	12	
6 Rms Riv Vu	1973	0	1	
Butley	1973	1	3	
Don Juan	1973	0	1	
Don't Bother Me, I Can't Cope	1973	0	4	
Don't Play Us Cheap	1973	0	2	
Elizabeth I	1973	0	1	
Irene	1973	1	4	
Look Away	1973	0	1	
Lost in the Stars	1973	0	2	
Mourning Becomes Electra	1973	0	1	
Much Ado About Nothing	1973	0	7	
Pippin	1973	5	11	
Shelter	1973	0	1	
Sugar	1973	0	4	
The Changing Room	1973	1	4	
The Great God Brown	1973	0	1	
The Jockey Club Stakes	1973	0	1	
The Last of Mrs. Lincoln	1973	2	2	
The Sunshine Boys	1973	0	3	
Tricks	1973	0	1	
**The River Niger**	1974	1	3	
**Raisin**	1974	2	9	
A Moon for the Misbegotten	1974	4	6	
Candide	1974	4 (1)	8	
Chemin de Fer	1974	0	3	
Crown Matrimonial	1974	0	1	
Cyrano	1974	1	2	
Find Your Way Home	1974	1	3	
Gigi	1974	1	4	
In the Boom Boom Room	1974	0	3	
Lorelei	1974	0	1	
Over Here!	1974	1	5	
Seesaw	1974	2	7	
The Au Pair Man	1974	0	4	
The Good Doctor	1974	1	4	
The Visit	1974	0	2	
Ulysses in Nighttown	1974	1	6	
Uncle Vanya	1974	0	3	
Veronica's Room	1974	0	1	
What the Wine-Sellers Buy	1974	0	2	
**Equus**	1975	2	5	
**The Wiz**	1975	7	8	
A Doll's House	1975	0	1	
A Letter for Queen Victoria	1975	0	1	
Absurd Person Singular	1975	0	3	
All God's Chillun Got Wings	1975	0	1	
Black Picture Show	1975	0	2	
Cat on a Hot Tin Roof	1975	0	1	
Clarence Darrow	1975	0	1	
Dance with Me	1975	0	3	
Doctor Jazz	1975	0	3	
God's Favorite	1975	0	1	
Goodtime Charley	1975	0	7	
Gypsy	1975	1	3	
Hughie and Duet	1975	0	1	
London Assurance	1975	0	2	
Mack and Mabel	1975	0	8	
My Fat Friend	1975	0	1	
Private Lives	1975	0	1	
Same Time, Next Year	1975	1	3	
Scapino!	1975	0	2	
Seascape	1975	1	3	
Shenandoah	1975	2	6	
Sherlock Holmes	1975	2	4	
Short Eyes	1975	0	1	
Sizwe Banzi Is Dead	1975	1	3	
The Island	1975	1	3	
The Lieutenant	1975	0	4	
The Magic Show	1975	0	2	
The Misanthrope	1975	0	3	
The National Health	1975	0	3	
The Night That Made America Famous	1975	0	2	
The Ritz	1975	1	1	
The Rocky Horror Show	1975	0	1	
Where's Charley?	1975	0	5	
**Travesties**	1976	2	3	
**A Chorus Line**	1976	9 (1)	12	
27 Wagons Full of Cotton	1976	0	1	
A Matter of Gravity	1976	0	1	
Ah, Wilderness!	1976	0	1	
Bubbling Brown Sugar	1976	0	3	
Chicago	1976	0	11	
Death of a Salesman	1976	0	1	
Habeas Corpus	1976	0	1	
Kennedy's Children	1976	1	1	
Knock Knock	1976	0	3	
Lamppost Reunion	1976	0	2	
Mrs. Warren's Profession	1976	1	2	
My Fair Lady	1976	1	2	
Pacific Overtures	1976	2	10	
Sweet Bird of Youth	1976	1	1	
The First Breeze of Summer	1976	0	1	
The Poison Tree	1976	0	1	
The Robber Bridegroom	1976	0	2	
The Royal Family	1976	1	3	
They Knew What They Wanted	1976	0	2	
Treemonisha	1976	0	1	
Trelawny of the 'Wells'	1976	0	3	
Very Good Eddie	1976	0	3	
Yentl	1976	0	1	
**The Shadow Box**	1977	2	5	
**Annie**	1977	7	10	
**Porgy and Bess**	1977	1	6	
American Buffalo	1977	0	2	
Anna Christie	1977	0	2	
Comedians	1977	1	2	
For Colored Girls Who Have Considered Suicide / When the Rainbow Is Enuf	1977	1	2	
Godspell	1977	0	1	
Guys and Dolls	1977	0	3	
Happy End	1977	0	3	
I Love My Wife	1977	2	6	
Music Is	1977	0	1	
No Man's Land	1977	0	2	
Otherwise Engaged	1977	0	2	
Side by Side by Sondheim	1977	0	5	
Sly Fox	1977	0	1	
Streamers	1977	0	2	
The Basic Training of Pavlo Hummel	1977	1	2	
The Belle of Amherst	1977	1	1	
The Cherry Orchard	1977	2	5	
The Innocents	1977	0	1	
The Robber Bridegroom	1977	1	1	
The Threepenny Opera	1977	0	5	
Who's Afraid of Virginia Woolf?	1977	0	2	
Your Arms Too Short to Box with God	1977	1	4	
**Da**	1978	4	4	
**Ain't Misbehavin'**	1978	3	5	
**Dracula**	1978	2	5	
A History of the American Film	1978	0	1	
A Touch of the Poet	1978	0	2	
Angel	1978	0	1	
Beatlemania	1978	0	1	
Chapter Two	1978	1	4	
Dancin'	1978	2	7	
Deathtrap	1978	0	4	
Golda	1978	0	1	
Hello, Dolly!	1978	0	1	
Miss Margarida's Way	1978	0	1	
On the Twentieth Century	1978	5	9	
Runaways	1978	0	5	
Tartuffe	1978	0	2	
The Act	1978	1	6	
The Gin Game	1978	1	4	
The Importance of Being Earnest	1978	0	1	
The Mighty Gents	1978	0	2	
Timbuktu!	1978	0	4	
Working	1978	0	6	
**The Elephant Man**	1979	3	7	
**Sweeney Todd: The Demon Barber of Fleet Street**	1979	8	9	
Ballroom	1979	1	8	
Bedroom Farce	1979	2	5	
Carmelina	1979	0	1	
Eubie!	1979	0	3	
First Monday in October	1979	0	1	
King of Hearts	1979	0	1	
Knockout	1979	0	1	
Man and Superman	1979	0	1	
My Old Friends	1979	0	1	
On Golden Pond	1979	0	1	
Platinum	1979	0	2	
Saravá	1979	0	1	
Spokesong	1979	0	1	
St. Mark's Gospel	1979	0	1	
The Best Little Whorehouse in Texas	1979	2	7	
The Crucifer of Blood	1979	1	4	
The Grand Tour	1979	0	3	
The Inspector General	1979	0	1	
They're Playing Our Song	1979	0	4	
Tribute	1979	0	1	
Whoopee!	1979	0	1	
Whose Life Is It Anyway	1979	1 (1)	3	
Wings	1979	1	3	
Zoot Suit	1979	0	1	
**Children of a Lesser God**	1980	3	4	
**Evita**	1980	7	11	
**Morning's at Seven**	1980	3	4	
A Day in Hollywood / A Night in the Ukraine	1980	2	9	
Barnum	1980	3	10	
Bent	1980	0	2	
Betrayal	1980	0	2	
Comin' Uptown	1980	0	1	
Happy New Year	1980	0	1	
Home	1980	0	2	
I Ought to Be in Pictures	1980	0	1	
Major Barbara	1980	0	1	
Night and Day	1980	0	2	
Nuts	1980	0	1	
Oklahoma!	1980	0	2	
Peter Pan	1980	0	2	
Strider	1980	0	2	
Sugar Babies	1980	0	8	
Talley's Folly	1980	1	5	
The Lady from Dubuque	1980	0	2	
The Most Happy Fella	1980	0	1	
Watch on the Rhine	1980	0	1	
West Side Story	1980	0	3	
**Amadeus**	1981	5	7	
**42nd Street**	1981	2	8	
**The Pirates of Penzance**	1981	3	7	
A Lesson from Aloes	1981	0	1	
A Life	1981	0	4	
Brigadoon	1981	0	3	
Bring Back Birdie	1981	0	1	
Camelot	1981	0	2	
Can-Can	1981	0	3	
Charlie and Algernon	1981	0	1	
Copperfield	1981	0	1	
Fifth of July	1981	1	5	
Lena Horne: The Lady and Her Music	1981	0 (1)	0	
Piaf	1981	1	2	
Rose	1981	0	2	
Shakespeare's Cabaret	1981	0	1	
Sophisticated Ladies	1981	2	8	
The Floating Light Bulb	1981	1	2	
The Little Foxes	1981	0	5	
The Moony Shapiro Songbook	1981	0	1	
The Suicide	1981	0	1	
Tintypes	1981	0	3	
To Grandmother's House We Go	1981	0	2	
Woman of the Year	1981	4	6	
**The Life and Adventures of Nicholas Nickleby**	1982	4	8	
**Nine**	1982	5	12	
**Othello**	1982	1	2	
"Master Harold"...and the Boys	1982	1	3	
A Taste of Honey	1982	0	2	
Agnes of God	1982	1	2	
Crimes of the Heart	1982	0	4	
Dreamgirls	1982	6	13	
Fiddler on the Roof	1982	0	1	
Joseph and the Amazing Technicolor Dreamcoat	1982	0	7	
Little Me	1982	0	3	
Marlowe	1982	0	1	
Mass Appeal	1982	0	2	
Medea	1982	1	6	
Merrily We Roll Along	1982	0	1	
My Fair Lady	1982	0	1	
Pump Boys and Dinettes	1982	0	1	
The Dresser	1982	0	2	
The First	1982	0	3	
The Hothouse	1982	0	1	
The West Side Waltz	1982	0	1	
**Torch Song Trilogy**	1983	2	2	
**Cats**	1983	7	11	
**On Your Toes**	1983	2	5	
'night, Mother	1983	0	4	
A Doll's Life	1983	0	3	
A View from the Bridge	1983	0	2	
Alice in Wonderland	1983	0	1	
All's Well That Ends Well	1983	0	7	
Angels Fall	1983	0	2	
Blues in the Night	1983	0	1	
Brighton Beach Memoirs	1983	2	4	
Foxfire	1983	1	3	
K2	1983	1	3	
Merlin	1983	0	5	
My One and Only	1983	3	9	
Passion Play	1983	0	1	
Plenty	1983	0	4	
Porgy and Bess	1983	0	2	
Seven Brides for Seven Brothers	1983	0	1	
Show Boat	1983	0	3	
Steaming	1983	1	1	
The Caine Mutiny Court-Martial	1983	0	1	
Your Arm's Too Short to Box with God	1983	0	1	
**The Real Thing**	1984	5	7	
**La Cage aux Folles**	1984	6	9	
**Death of a Salesman**	1984	1	1	
A Moon for the Misbegotten	1984	0	4	
Amen Corner	1984	0	1	
American Buffalo	1984	0	1	
Baby	1984	0	7	
End of the World	1984	0	3	
Glengarry Glen Ross	1984	1	4	
Heartbreak House	1984	0	6	
Ian McKellen Acting Shakespeare	1984	0	1	
La Tragedie de Carmen	1984	0 (1)	0	
Noises Off	1984	0	4	
Oliver!	1984	0	1	
Open Admissions	1984	0	1	
Play Memory	1984	0	2	
Sunday in the Park with George	1984	2	10	
The Human Comedy	1984	0	1	
The Rink	1984	1	5	
The Tap Dance Kid	1984	2	7	
Zorba	1984	1	1	
**Biloxi Blues**	1985	3	3	
**Big River**	1985	7	10	
**A Day in the Death of Joe Egg**	1985	2	4	
As Is	1985	0	3	
Cyrano de Bergerac	1985	0	3	
Grind	1985	2	7	
Harrigan 'N Hart	1985	0	1	
Hurlyburly	1985	1	4	
Leader of the Pack	1985	0	1	
Ma Rainey's Black Bottom	1985	0	3	
Much Ado About Nothing	1985	1	7	
Pack of Lies	1985	0	1	
Quilters	1985	0	6	
Requiem for a Heavyweight	1985	0	1	
Strange Interlude	1985	0	6	
Take Me Along	1985	0	1	
The King and I	1985	0	2	
**I'm Not Rappaport**	1986	3	3	
**The Mystery of Edwin Drood**	1986	5	11	
**Sweet Charity**	1986	4	5	
Benefactors	1986	0	2	
Big Deal	1986	1	5	
Blood Knot	1986	0	1	
Hay Fever	1986	0	2	
Jerome Kern Goes to Hollywood	1986	0	1	
Jerry's Girls	1986	0	1	
Long Day's Journey into Night	1986	0	4	
Loot	1986	0	5	
Precious Sons	1986	0	1	
Singin' in the Rain	1986	0	2	
Song and Dance	1986	1	8	
Tango Argentino	1986	0	3	
The Boys in Winter	1986	0	1	
The House of Blue Leaves	1986	4	8	
The Iceman Cometh	1986	0	4	
The Marriage of Figaro	1986	0	2	
The News	1986	0	1	
The Petition	1986	0	2	
The Search for Signs of Intelligent Life in the Universe	1986	1	1	
Uptown...It's Hot!	1986	0	1	
Wind in the Willows	1986	0	2	
**Fences**	1987	4	6	
**Les Misérables**	1987	8	12	
**All My Sons**	1987	1	3	
Asinamali!	1987	0	1	
Blithe Spirit	1987	0	1	
Broadway Bound	1987	2	4	
Coastal Disturbances	1987	0	3	
Les Liaisons Dangereuses	1987	0	7	
Me and My Girl	1987	3	13	
Oh, Coward!	1987	0	2	
Pygmalion	1987	0	2	
Rags	1987	0	5	
Smile	1987	0	1	
Starlight Express	1987	1	7	
Stepping Out	1987	0	1	
The Front Page	1987	0	2	
The Life and Adventures of Nicholas Nickleby	1987	0	1	
The Mikado	1987	0	2	
The World According to Me	1987	0 (1)	0	
Wild Honey	1987	0	1	
You Never Can Tell	1987	0	1	
**M. Butterfly**	1988	3	7	
**The Phantom of the Opera**	1988	7	10	
**Anything Goes**	1988	3	10	
A Streetcar Named Desire	1988	0	3	
A Walk in the Woods	1988	0	2	
Breaking the Code	1988	0	3	
Burn This	1988	1	2	
Cabaret	1988	0	4	
Chess	1988	0	2	
Dreamgirls	1988	0	1	
Into the Woods	1988	3	10	
Joe Turner's Come and Gone	1988	1	6	
Macbeth	1988	0	1	
Romance/Romance	1988	0	5	
Sarafina!	1988	0	5	
Serious Money	1988	0	1	
Speed-the-Plow	1988	1	3	
The Gospel at Colonus	1988	0	1	
**The Heidi Chronicles**	1989	2	6	
**Jerome Robbins' Broadway**	1989	6	10	
**Our Town**	1989	1	5	
Ah, Wilderness!	1989	0	1	
Ain't Misbehavin'	1989	0	1	
Black and Blue	1989	3	10	
Born Yesterday	1989	0	1	
Cafe Crown	1989	1	2	
Eastern Standard	1989	0	1	
Ghetto	1989	0	1	
Largely New York	1989	0	5	
Legs Diamond	1989	0	3	
Lend Me a Tenor	1989	2	7	
The Metamorphosis in popular culture#Stage and opera	1989	0	2	
Rumors	1989	1	1	
Shirley Valentine	1989	1	2	
Spoils of War	1989	0	1	
Starmites	1989	0	6	
Welcome to the Club	1989	0	2	
**The Grapes of Wrath**	1990	2	8	
**City of Angels**	1990	6	11	
**Gypsy**	1990	2	5	
A Few Good Men	1990	0	1	
Aspects of Love	1990	0	6	
Cat on a Hot Tin Roof	1990	1	3	
Dangerous Games	1990	0	1	
Grand Hotel	1990	5	12	
Lettice and Lovage	1990	2	4	
Meet Me in St. Louis	1990	0	4	
Orpheus Descending	1990	0	1	
Prelude to a Kiss	1990	0	2	
Some Americans Abroad	1990	0	1	
Sweeney Todd: The Demon Barber of Fleet Street	1990	0	4	
The Circle	1990	0	1	
The Merchant of Venice	1990	0	4	
The Piano Lesson	1990	0	5	
The Threepenny Opera	1990	0	1	
True	1990	1	1	
**Lost in Yonkers**	1991	4	5	
**The Will Rogers Follies**	1991	6	11	
**Fiddler on the Roof**	1991	1	2	
Buddy: The Buddy Holly Story	1991	0	1	
I Hate Hamlet	1991	0	1	
La Bête	1991	0	5	
Lucifer's Child	1991	0	1	
Miss Saigon	1991	3	11	
Oh, Kay!	1991	0	2	
Once on This Island	1991	0	8	
Our Country's Good	1991	0	6	
Peter Pan	1991	0	2	
Shadowlands	1991	1	2	
Shōgun: The Musical	1991	0	2	
Six Degrees of Separation	1991	1	4	
The Miser	1991	0	1	
The Secret Garden	1991	3	7	
The Speed of Darkness	1991	0	2	
Those Were the Days	1991	0	2	
**Dancing at Lughnasa**	1992	3	8	
**Crazy for You**	1992	3	9	
**Guys and Dolls**	1992	4	8	
A Small Family Business	1992	0	1	
A Streetcar Named Desire	1992	0	1	
Conversations with My Father	1992	1	3	
Death and the Maiden	1992	1	1	
Falsettos	1992	2	7	
Five Guys Named Moe	1992	0	2	
Four Baboons Adoring the Sun	1992	0	4	
Jake's Women	1992	0	1	
Jelly's Last Jam	1992	3	11	
Metro	1992	0	1	
Nick & Nora	1992	0	1	
On Borrowed Time	1992	0	1	
Park Your Car in Harvard Yard	1992	0	1	
The Fantasticks	1992	0 (1)	0	
The High Rollers Social and Pleasure Club	1992	0	1	
The Most Happy Fella	1992	1	4	
The Visit	1992	0	2	
Two Shakespearean Actors	1992	0	5	
Two Trains Running	1992	1	4	
**Angels in America: Millennium Approaches**	1993	4	9	
**Kiss of the Spider Woman**	1993	7	11	
**Anna Christie**	1993	1	5	
Ain't Broadway Grand	1993	0	1	
Anna Karenina	1993	0	4	
Blood Brothers	1993	0	6	
Candida	1993	0	1	
My Favorite Year	1993	1	3	
Oklahoma!	1993	0 (1)	0	
Redwood Curtain	1993	1	3	
Shakespeare for My Father	1993	0	1	
Someone Who'll Watch Over Me	1993	0	2	
Saint Joan	1993	0	1	
The Goodbye Girl	1993	0	6	
The Price	1993	0	1	
The Sisters Rosensweig	1993	1	5	
The Song of Jacob Zulu	1993	0	6	
The Who's Tommy	1993	5	11	
Wilder, Wilder, Wilder	1993	0	1	
**Angels in America: Perestroika**	1994	3	6	
**Passion**	1994	4	10	
**An Inspector Calls**	1994	4	5	
**Carousel**	1994	5	5	
A Grand Night for Singing	1994	0	2	
Abe Lincoln in Illinois	1994	0	3	
Beauty and the Beast	1994	1	9	
Black Comedy	1994	0	1	
Broken Glass	1994	0	1	
Cyrano: The Musical	1994	0	4	
Damn Yankees	1994	1	4	
Grease	1994	0	3	
Medea	1994	1	3	
No Man's Land	1994	0	1	
Picnic	1994	0	3	
Sally Marr... and Her Escorts	1994	0	1	
She Loves Me	1994	1	9	
The Best Little Whorehouse Goes Public	1994	0	1	
The Kentucky Cycle	1994	0	3	
Timon of Athens	1994	0	3	
Twilight: Los Angeles, 1992	1994	0	2	
**Love! Valour! Compassion!**	1995	2	5	
**Sunset Boulevard**	1995	7	11	
**The Heiress**	1995	4	7	
**Show Boat**	1995	5	10	
A Month in the Country	1995	0	1	
A Tuna Christmas	1995	0	1	
Arcadia	1995	0	3	
Hamlet	1995	1	2	
Having Our Say	1995	0	3	
How to Succeed in Business Without Really Trying	1995	1	4	
Indiscretions	1995	0	9	
Smokey Joe's Cafe	1995	0	7	
The Molière Comedies	1995	0	3	
The Rose Tattoo	1995	0	1	
The Shadow Box	1995	0	1	
**Master Class**	1996	3	3	
**Rent**	1996	4	10	
**A Delicate Balance**	1996	3	7	
**The King and I**	1996	4	8	
A Funny Thing Happened on the Way to the Forum	1996	1	4	
A Midsummer Night's Dream	1996	0	2	
An Ideal Husband	1996	0	3	
Big	1996	0	5	
Bring in 'da Noise, Bring in 'da Funk	1996	4	9	
Buried Child	1996	0	5	
Chronicle of a Death Foretold	1996	0	3	
Company	1996	0	2	
Hello, Dolly!	1996	0	1	
Holiday	1996	0	1	
Inherit the Wind	1996	0	2	
Moon Over Buffalo	1996	0	2	
Racing Demon	1996	0	1	
Seven Guitars	1996	1	8	
State Fair	1996	0	2	
Swinging on a Star	1996	0	1	
Victor/Victoria	1996	0	1	
**The Last Night of Ballyhoo**	1997	1	4	
**Titanic**	1997	5	5	
**A Doll's House**	1997	4	4	
**Chicago**	1997	6	8	
An American Daughter	1997	1	1	
Annie	1997	0	1	
Barrymore	1997	1	1	
Candide	1997	1	4	
Dream	1997	0	1	
Jekyll & Hyde	1997	0	4	
Juan Darién	1997	0	5	
London Assurance	1997	0	3	
Once Upon a Mattress	1997	0	1	
Play On!	1997	0	3	
Present Laughter	1997	0	1	
Skylight	1997	0	4	
Stanley	1997	0	3	
Steel Pier	1997	0	11	
The Gin Game	1997	0	3	
The Life	1997	2	12	
The Little Foxes	1997	0	2	
The Young Man from Atlanta	1997	0	3	
**'Art'**	1998	1	3	
**The Lion King**	1998	6	11	
**A View from the Bridge**	1998	2	4	
**Cabaret**	1998	4	10	
1776	1998	0	3	
Ah, Wilderness!	1998	0	2	
Forever Tango	1998	0	1	
Freak	1998	0	2	
Golden Child	1998	0	3	
High Society	1998	0	2	
Honour	1998	0	2	
Ivanov	1998	0	1	
Ragtime	1998	4	13	
Side Show	1998	0	4	
The Beauty Queen of Leenane	1998	4	6	
The Capeman	1998	0	3	
The Chairs	1998	0	6	
The Diary of Anne Frank	1998	0	2	
The Scarlet Pimpernel	1998	0	3	
The Sound of Music	1998	0	1	
Triumph of Love	1998	0	1	
**Side Man**	1999	2	2	
**Fosse**	1999	3	8	
**Death of a Salesman**	1999	4	6	
**Annie Get Your Gun**	1999	2	3	
Amy's View	1999	1	2	
Closer	1999	0	1	
Electra	1999	0	3	
Fool Moon	1999	1	1	
Footloose	1999	0	4	
It Ain't Nothin' but the Blues	1999	0	4	
Little Me	1999	1	4	
Marlene	1999	0	2	
Not About Nightingales	1999	1	6	
One the Town	1999	0	1	
Parade	1999	2	9	
Peter Pan	1999	0	1	
Ring Round the Moon	1999	0	2	
Swan Lake	1999	3	5	
The Civil War	1999	0	2	
The Iceman Cometh	1999	0	5	
The Lion in Winter	1999	0	1	
The Lonesome West	1999	0	4	
Twelfth Night	1999	0	5	
You're a Good Man, Charlie Brown	1999	2	4	
**Copenhagen**	2000	3	3	
**Contact**	2000	4	7	
**The Real Thing**	2000	3	5	
**Kiss Me, Kate**	2000	5	12	
A Moon for the Misbegotten	2000	1	4	
Aida	2000	4	5	
Amadeus	2000	0	2	
Dame Edna: The Royal Tour	2000	1	1	
Dirty Blonde	2000	0	5	
James Joyce's The Dead	2000	1	5	
Jesus Christ Superstar	2000	0	1	
Marie Christine	2000	0	5	
Putting It Together	2000	0	1	
Swing!	2000	0	6	
Tango Argentino	2000	0	1	
The Green Bird	2000	0	2	
The Music Man	2000	0	8	
The Price	2000	0	1	
The Rainmaker	2000	0	1	
The Ride Down Mt. Morgan	2000	0	2	
The Wild Party	2000	0	7	
True West	2000	0	4	
Uncle Vanya	2000	0	2	
Waiting in the Wings	2000	0	2	
Wrong Mountain	2000	0	1	
**Proof**	2001	3	6	
**The Producers**	2001	12	15	
**One Flew Over the Cuckoo's Nest**	2001	1	2	
**42nd Street**	2001	2	9	
A Class Act	2001	0	5	
Bells Are Ringing	2001	0	2	
Betrayal	2001	0	2	
Blast!	2001	1	2	
Follies	2001	0	5	
Jane Eyre	2001	0	5	
Judgment at Nuremberg	2001	0	2	
King Hedley II	2001	1	6	
Seussical	2001	0	1	
Stones in His Pockets	2001	0	3	
The Adventures of Tom Sawyer	2001	0	2	
The Best Man	2001	0	1	
The Dinner Party	2001	0	1	
The Full Monty	2001	0	10	
The Invention of Love	2001	2	5	
The Man Who Came to Dinner	2001	0	1	
The Rocky Horror Show	2001	0	4	
The Search for Signs of Intelligent Life in the Universe	2001	0	1	
The Tale of the Allergist's Wife	2001	0	3	
**The Goat, or Who Is Sylvia?**	2002	1	2	
**Thoroughly Modern Millie**	2002	6	11	
**Private Lives**	2002	3	6	
**Into the Woods**	2002	2	10	
Barbara Cook Sings Mostly Sondheim	2002	0	1	
Bea Arthur on Broadway	2002	0	1	
Elaine Stritch at Liberty	2002	1	1	
Fortune's Fool	2002	2	3	
Hedda Gabler	2002	0	1	
Mamma Mia!	2002	0	5	
Metamorphoses	2002	1	3	
Morning's at Seven	2002	0	9	
Noises Off	2002	1	2	
Oklahoma!	2002	1	7	
Sexaholic... A Love Story	2002	0	1	
Sweet Smell of Success	2002	1	7	
The Crucible	2002	0	6	
The Dance of Death	2002	0	1	
The Elephant Man	2002	0	2	
The Man Who Had All the Luck	2002	0	1	
Thou Shalt Not	2002	0	2	
Topdog/Underdog	2002	0	2	
Urinetown	2002	3	10	
**Take Me Out**	2003	3	4	
**Hairspray**	2003	8	12	
**Long Day's Journey into Night**	2003	3	7	
**Nine**	2003	2	8	
A Day in the Death of Joe Egg	2003	0	4	
A Year with Frog and Toad	2003	0	3	
Amour	2003	0	5	
Bill Maher: Victory Begins at Home	2003	0	1	
Def Poetry Jam	2003	1	1	
Dinner at Eight	2003	0	5	
Enchanted April	2003	0	2	
Flower Drum Song	2003	0	3	
Frankie and Johnny in the Clair de Lune	2003	0	2	
Gypsy	2003	0	4	
Hollywood Arms	2003	1	1	
La bohème	2003	2 (1)	6	
Life x 3	2003	0	1	
Ma Rainey's Black Bottom	2003	0	1	
Man of La Mancha	2003	0	3	
Medea	2003	0	2	
Movin' Out	2003	2	10	
Our Town	2003	0	1	
Prune Danish	2003	0	1	
Say Goodnight, Gracie	2003	0	1	
Tartuffe	2003	0	2	
The Play What I Wrote	2003	0	1	
Urban Cowboy	2003	0	2	
Vincent in Brixton	2003	0	2	
**I Am My Own Wife**	2004	2	3	
**Avenue Q**	2004	3	6	
**Assassins**	2004	5	7	
**Henry IV (a combination of Part 1 and Part 2)**	2004	2	6	
A Raisin in the Sun	2004	2	4	
Anna in the Tropics	2004	0	2	
Big River	2004	0 (1)	2	
Bombay Dreams	2004	0	3	
Caroline, or Change	2004	1	6	
Cat on a Hot Tin Roof	2004	0	1	
Fiddler on the Roof	2004	0	6	
Frozen	2004	1	4	
Golda's Balcony	2004	0	1	
Jumpers	2004	0	4	
King Lear	2004	0	2	
Little Shop of Horrors	2004	0	1	
Match	2004	0	1	
Never Gonna Dance	2004	0	2	
Sixteen Wounded	2004	0	1	
Taboo	2004	0	4	
The Boy from Oz	2004	1	5	
The Caretaker	2004	0	1	
The Retreat from Moscow	2004	0	3	
Twentieth Century	2004	0	2	
Wicked	2004	3	10	
Wonderful Town	2004	1	5	
**Doubt: A Parable**	2005	4	8	
**Monty Python's Spamalot**	2005	3	14	
**Glengarry Glen Ross**	2005	2	6	
**La Cage aux Folles**	2005	2	4	
A Streetcar Named Desire	2005	0	3	
Billy Crystal 700 Sundays	2005	1	1	
Chitty Chitty Bang Bang	2005	0	5	
Dame Edna: Back with a Vengeance!	2005	0	1	
Democracy	2005	0	1	
Dirty Rotten Scoundrels	2005	1	11	
Gem of the Ocean	2005	0	5	
Laugh Whore	2005	0	1	
Little Women	2005	0	1	
On Golden Pond	2005	0	2	
Pacific Overtures	2005	0	4	
Reckless	2005	0	1	
Sight Unseen	2005	0	1	
Sweet Charity	2005	0	3	
The 25th Annual Putnam County Spelling Bee	2005	2	6	
The Light in the Piazza	2005	6	11	
The Pillowman	2005	2	6	
The Rivals	2005	1	2	
Twelve Angry Men	2005	0	3	
Whoopi the 20th Anniversary Show	2005	0	1	
Who's Afraid of Virginia Woolf?	2005	0	6	
**The History Boys**	2006	6	7	
**Jersey Boys**	2006	4	8	
**Awake and Sing!**	2006	2	8	
**The Pajama Game**	2006	2	9	
A Touch of the Poet	2006	0	1	
Bridge and Tunnel	2006	0 (1)	0	
Chita Rivera: The Dancer's Life	2006	0	1	
Faith Healer	2006	1	4	
Forbidden Broadway	2006	0 (1)	0	
Lestat	2006	0	2	
Rabbit Hole	2006	1	5	
Seascape	2006	0	2	
Shining City	2006	0	2	
Souvenir	2006	0	1	
Sweeney Todd: The Demon Barber of Fleet Street	2006	2	6	
Tarzan	2006	0	1	
The Caine Mutiny Court-Martial	2006	0	1	
The Color Purple	2006	1	11	
The Constant Wife	2006	0	4	
The Drowsy Chaperone	2006	5	13	
The Lieutenant of Inishmore	2006	0	5	
The Threepenny Opera	2006	0	2	
The Wedding Singer	2006	0	5	
The Woman in White	2006	0	1	
Three Days of Rain	2006	0	2	
Well	2006	0	1	
**The Coast of Utopia**	2007	7	10	
**Spring Awakening**	2007	8	11	
**Journey's End**	2007	1	6	
**Company**	2007	1	3	
110 in the Shade	2007	0	5	
A Chorus Line	2007	0	2	
A Moon for the Misbegotten	2007	0	1	
Butley	2007	0	1	
Coram Boy	2007	0	6	
Curtains	2007	1	8	
Deuce	2007	0	1	
Frost Nixon	2007	1	3	
Grey Gardens	2007	3	10	
Heartbreak House	2007	0	2	
High Fidelity	2007	0	1	
Inherit the Wind	2007	0	4	
Jay Johnson: The Two and Only	2007	1	1	
Kiki and Gerb: Alive on Broadway	2007	0	1	
Legally Blonde	2007	0	7	
LoveMusik	2007	0	4	
Martin Short: Fame Becomes Me	2007	0	1	
Mary Poppins	2007	1	7	
Radio Golf	2007	0	4	
Talk Radio	2007	0	2	
The Apple Tree	2007	0	1	
The Little Dog Laughed	2007	1	2	
The Year of Magical Thinking	2007	0	1	
Translations	2007	0	1	
**August: Osage County**	2008	5	7	
**In the Heights**	2008	4	13	
**Boeing-Boeing**	2008	2	6	
**South Pacific**	2008	7	11	
A Catered Affair	2008	0	3	
Come Back, Little Sheba	2008	0	1	
Cry-Baby	2008	0	4	
Cyrano de Bergerac	2008	0	1	
Grease	2008	0	1	
Gypsy	2008	3	7	
Is He Dead?	2008	0	1	
Les Liaisons Dangereuses	2008	1	5	
Macbeth	2008	0	6	
Mauritius	2008	0	1	
November	2008	0	1	
Passing Strange	2008	1	7	
Rock 'n' Roll	2008	0	4	
Sunday in the Park with George	2008	0	9	
The 39 Steps	2008	2	6	
The Homecoming	2008	0	3	
The Little Mermaid	2008	0	2	
The Seafarer	2008	1	4	
Thurgood	2008	0	1	
Top Girls	2008	0	1	
Xanadu	2008	0	4	
Young Frankenstein	2008	0	3	
**God of Carnage**	2009	3	6	
**Billy Elliot the Musical**	2009	10	15	
**The Norman Conquests**	2009	1	7	
**Hair**	2009	1	8	
[title of show]	2009	0	1	
33 Variations	2009	1	5	
9 to 5	2009	0	4	
Blithe Spirit	2009	1	2	
Dividing the Estate	2009	0	2	
Equus	2009	1	2	
Exit the King	2009	1	4	
Guys and Dolls	2009	0	2	
White Christmas	2009	0	2	
Joe Turner's Come and Gone	2009	2	6	
Liza's at The Palace....	2009	1	1	
Mary Stuart	2009	1	7	
Next to Normal	2009	3	11	
Pal Joey	2009	0	4	
Reasons to Be Pretty	2009	0	3	
Rock of Ages	2009	0	5	
Shrek The Musical	2009	1	8	
Slava's Snowshow	2009	0	1	
Soul of Shaolin	2009	0	1	
Speed-the-Plow	2009	0	1	
Waiting for Godot	2009	0	3	
West Side Story	2009	1	4	
You're Welcome America - A Final Night with George W. Bush	2009	0	1	
**Red**	2010	6	7	
**Memphis**	2010	4	8	
**Fences**	2010	3	10	
**La Cage aux Folles**	2010	3	11	
A Behanding in Spokane	2010	0	1	
A Little Night Music	2010	1	4	
A View from the Bridge	2010	1	6	
American Idiot	2010	2	3	
Collected Stories	2010	0	1	
Come Fly Away	2010	0	2	
Enron	2010	0	4	
Everyday Rapture	2010	0	2	
Fela!	2010	3	11	
Finian's Rainbow	2010	0	3	
Hamlet	2010	0	2	
In the Next Room (or The Vibrator Play)	2010	0	3	
Lend Me a Tenor	2010	0	3	
Looped	2010	0	1	
Million Dollar Quartet	2010	1	3	
Next Fall	2010	0	2	
Present Laughter	2010	0	1	
Promises, Promises	2010	1	4	
Race	2010	0	1	
Ragtime	2010	0	6	
Sondheim on Sondheim	2010	0	2	
Superior Donuts	2010	0	1	
The Addams Family	2010	0	2	
The Royal Family	2010	1	5	
Time Stands Still	2010	0	2	
**War Horse**	2011	5	5	
**The Book of Mormon**	2011	9	14	
**The Normal Heart**	2011	3	5	
**Anything Goes**	2011	3	9	
Arcadia	2011	0	2	
Baby It's You!	2011	0	1	
Bengal Tiger at the Baghdad Zoo	2011	0	3	
Bloody Bloody Andrew Jackson	2011	0	2	
Born Yesterday	2011	0	2	
Brief Encounter	2011	0	2	
Catch Me If You Can	2011	1	4	
Driving Miss Daisy	2011	0	1	
Good People	2011	1	2	
How to Succeed in Business Without Really Trying	2011	1	8	
Jerusalem	2011	1	6	
La Bête	2011	0	2	
Lombardi	2011	0	1	
Priscilla, Queen of the Desert	2011	1	2	
Sister Act	2011	0	5	
The House of Blue Leaves	2011	0	1	
The Importance of Being Earnest	2011	1	3	
The Merchant of Venice	2011	0	7	
The Motherf**ker with the Hat	2011	0	6	
The People in the Picture	2011	0	1	
The Scottsboro Boys	2011	0	12	
Women on the Verge of a Nervous Breakdown	2011	0	3	
**Clybourne Park**	2012	1	4	
**Once**	2012	8	11	
**Death of a Salesman**	2012	2	7	
**Porgy and Bess**	2012	2	10	
A Streetcar Named Desire	2012	0	1	
Bonnie & Clyde	2012	0	2	
Don't Dress for Dinner	2012	0	2	
End of the Rainbow	2012	0	3	
Evita	2012	0	3	
Follies	2012	1	7	
Ghost	2012	0	3	
Jesus Christ Superstar	2012	0	2	
Leap of Faith	2012	0	1	
Lysistrata Jones	2012	0	1	
Man and Boy	2012	0	1	
Master Class	2012	0	1	
Newsies	2012	2	8	
Nice Work If You Can Get It	2012	2	10	
On a Clear Day You Can See Forever	2012	0	1	
One Man, Two Guvnors	2012	1	7	
Other Desert Cities	2012	1	5	
Peter and the Starcatcher	2012	5	9	
Spider-Man: Turn Off the Dark	2012	0	2	
Stick Fly	2012	0	1	
The Best Man	2012	0	2	
The Columnist	2012	0	1	
The Lyons	2012	0	1	
The Road to Mecca	2012	0	1	
Venus in Fur	2012	1	2	
Wit	2012	0	2	
**Vanya and Sonia and Masha and Spike**	2013	1	6	
**Kinky Boots**	2013	6	13	
**Who's Afraid of Virginia Woolf?**	2013	3	5	
**Pippin**	2013	4	10	
A Christmas Story: The Musical	2013	0	3	
Ann	2013	0	1	
Annie	2013	0	1	
Bring It On: The Musical	2013	0	2	
Chaplin	2013	0	1	
Cyrano de Bergerac	2013	0	1	
Golden Boy	2013	0	8	
Hands on a Hardbody	2013	0	3	
Lucky Guy	2013	2	6	
Matilda the Musical	2013	4 (1)	12	
Motown: The Musical	2013	0	4	
Orphans	2013	0	2	
Rodgers + Hammerstein's Cinderella	2013	1	9	
Scandalous: The Life and Trials of Aimee Semple McPherson	2013	0	1	
The Assembled Parties	2013	1	3	
The Big Knife	2013	0	1	
The Heiress	2013	0	2	
The Lost Colony	2013	0 (1)	0	
The Mystery of Edwin Drood	2013	0	5	
The Nance	2013	3	5	
The Other Place	2013	0	1	
The Testament of Mary	2013	0	3	
The Trip to Bountiful	2013	1	4	
**All the Way**	2014	2	2	
**A Gentleman's Guide to Love and Murder**	2014	4	10	
**A Raisin in the Sun**	2014	3	5	
**Hedwig and the Angry Inch**	2014	4	8	
A Night with Janis Joplin	2014	0	1	
Act One	2014	1	5	
After Midnight	2014	1	7	
Aladdin	2014	1	5	
Beautiful: The Carole King Musical	2014	2	7	
Bullets Over Broadway	2014	0	6	
Cabaret	2014	0	2	
Casa Valentina	2014	0	4	
If/Then	2014	0	2	
Lady Day at Emerson's Bar and Grill	2014	2	2	
Les Misérables	2014	0	3	
Machinal	2014	0	4	
Mothers and Sons	2014	0	2	
Of Mice and Men	2014	0	2	
Outside Mullingar	2014	0	1	
Richard III	2014	0	1	
Rocky the Musical	2014	1	4	
The Bridges of Madison County	2014	2	4	
The Cripple of Inishmaan	2014	0	6	
The Glass Menagerie	2014	1	7	
The Velocity of Autumn	2014	0	1	
Twelfth Night	2014	2	7	
Violet	2014	0	4	
**The Curious Incident of the Dog in the Night-Time**	2015	5	6	
**Fun Home**	2015	5	12	
**Skylight**	2015	1	7	
**The King and I**	2015	4	9	
Airline Highway	2015	0	4	
An American in Paris	2015	4	12	
Constellations	2015	0	1	
Disgraced	2015	0	1	
Gigi	2015	0	1	
Hand to God	2015	0	5	
It's Only a Play	2015	0	1	
On the Town	2015	0	4	
On the Twentieth Century	2015	0	5	
Something Rotten!	2015	1	10	
The Audience	2015	2	3	
The Elephant Man	2015	0	4	
The Heidi Chronicles	2015	0	1	
The Last Ship	2015	0	2	
The Visit	2015	0	5	
This Is Our Youth	2015	0	1	
Wolf Hall Parts One & Two	2015	1	8	
You Can't Take It with You	2015	1	5	
**The Humans**	2016	4	6	
**Hamilton**	2016	11	16	
**A View from the Bridge**	2016	2	5	
**The Color Purple**	2016	2	4	
American Psycho	2016	0	2	
Blackbird	2016	0	3	
Bright Star	2016	0	5	
Dames at Sea	2016	0	1	
Disaster!	2016	0	1	
Eclipsed	2016	1	6	
Fiddler on the Roof	2016	0	3	
Hughie	2016	0	1	
King Charles III	2016	0	5	
Long Day's Journey Into Night	2016	2	7	
Misery	2016	0	1	
Noises Off	2016	0	5	
On Your Feet!	2016	0	1	
School of Rock	2016	0	4	
She Loves Me	2016	1	8	
Shuffle Along, or, the Making of the Musical Sensation of 1921 and All That Followed	2016	0	10	
Spring Awakening	2016	0	3	
The Crucible	2016	0	4	
The Father	2016	1	2	
Thérèse Raquin	2016	0	1	
Tuck Everlasting	2016	0	1	
Waitress	2016	0	4	
**Oslo**	2017	2	7	
**Dear Evan Hansen**	2017	6	9	
**Jitney**	2017	1	6	
**Hello, Dolly!**	2017	4	10	
A Doll's House, Part 2	2017	1	8	
Anastasia	2017	0	2	
Bandstand	2017	1	2	
Come from Away	2017	1	7	
Falsettos	2017	0	5	
Groundhog Day	2017	0	7	
Heisenberg	2017	0	1	
Holiday Inn	2017	0	1	
Indecent	2017	2	3	
Miss Saigon	2017	0	2	
Natasha, Pierre & The Great Comet of 1812	2017	2	12	
Present Laughter	2017	1	3	
Six Degrees of Separation	2017	0	2	
Sweat	2017	0	3	
The Front Page	2017	0	2	
The Glass Menagerie	2017	0	1	
The Little Foxes	2017	2	6	
The Play That Goes Wrong	2017	1	1	
The Present	2017	0	1	
The Price	2017	0	1	
War Paint	2017	0	4	
**Harry Potter and the Cursed Child**	2018	6	10	
**The Band's Visit**	2018	10	11	
**Angels in America**	2018	3	11	
**Once on This Island**	2018	1	8	
1984	2018	0	1	
Carousel	2018	2	11	
Children of a Lesser God	2018	0	1	
Farinelli and the King	2018	0	5	
Frozen	2018	0	3	
Junk: The Golden Age of Debt	2018	0	2	
Latin History for Morons	2018	0	1	
Lobby Hero	2018	0	3	
Mean Girls	2018	0	12	
Meteor Shower	2018	0	1	
My Fair Lady	2018	1	10	
Saint Joan	2018	0	1	
SpongeBob SquarePants	2018	1	12	
Summer: The Donna Summer Musical	2018	0	2	
The Children	2018	0	2	
The Iceman Cometh	2018	0	8	
Three Tall Women	2018	2	6	
Travesties	2018	0	4	
**The Ferryman**	2019	4	9	
**Hadestown**	2019	8	14	
**The Boys in the Band**	2019	1	2	
**Oklahoma!**	2019	2	8	
Ain’t Too Proud: The Life and Times of The Temptations	2019	1	12	
All My Sons	2019	0	3	
Be More Chill	2019	0	1	
Beetlejuice	2019	0	8	
Bernhardt/Hamlet	2019	0	2	
Burn This	2019	0	3	
Choir Boy	2019	1	4	
Gary: A Sequel to Titus Andronicus	2019	0	7	
Hillary and Clinton	2019	0	1	
Ink	2019	2	6	
King Kong	2019	0	3	
King Lear	2019	0	1	
Kiss Me, Kate	2019	0	4	
Network	2019	1	5	
The Cher Show	2019	2	3	
The Prom	2019	0	7	
The Waverly Gallery	2019	1	2	
To Kill a Mockingbird	2019	1	9	
Tootsie	2019	2	11	
Torch Song	2019	0	2	
What the Constitution Means to Me	2019	0	2	
**The Inheritance**	2021	4	11	
**Moulin Rouge!**	2021	10	14	
**A Soldier's Play**	2021	2	7	
A Christmas Carol	2021	5	5	
American Utopia	2021	0 (1)	0	
Betrayal	2021	0	4	
Frankie and Johnny in the Clair de Lune	2021	0	2	
Freestyle Love Supreme	2021	0 (1)	0	
Grand Horizons	2021	0	2	
Jagged Little Pill	2021	2	15	
Linda Vista	2021	0	2	
My Name Is Lucy Barton	2021	0	1	
Sea Wall/A Life	2021	0	4	
Slave Play	2021	0	12	
The Rose Tattoo	2021	0	2	
The Sound Inside	2021	1	6	
Tina: The Tina Turner Musical	2021	1	12	
**The Lehman Trilogy**	2022	5	8	
**A Strange Loop**	2022	2	11	
**Take Me Out**	2022	2	4	
**Company**	2022	5	9	
American Buffalo	2022	0	4	
Caroline, or Change	2022	0	3	
Clyde's	2022	0	5	
Dana H.	2022	2	3	
Diana	2022	0	1	
Flying Over Sunset	2022	0	4	
For Colored Girls Who Have Considered Suicide / When the Rainbow Is Enuf	2022	0	7	
Funny Girl	2022	0	1	
Girl from the North Country	2022	1	7	
Hangmen	2022	0	5	
How I Learned to Drive	2022	0	3	
Lackawanna Blues	2022	0	1	
Macbeth	2022	0	3	
MJ the Musical	2022	4	10	
Mr. Saturday Night	2022	0	5	
Mrs. Doubtfire	2022	0	1	
Paradise Square	2022	1	10	
Plaza Suite	2022	0	1	
POTUS: Or, Behind Every Great Dumbass Are Seven Women Trying to Keep Him Alive	2022	0	3	
Six	2022	2	8	
Skeleton Crew	2022	1	3	
The Minutes	2022	0	1	
The Music Man	2022	0	6	
The Skin of Our Teeth	2022	1	6	
Trouble in Mind	2022	0	4	
**Leopoldstadt**	2023	4	6	
**Kimberly Akimbo**	2023	5	8	
**Topdog/Underdog**	2023	1	3	
**Parade**	2023	2	6	
& Juliet	2023	0	9	
A Christmas Carol	2023	0	3	
A Doll's House	2023	0	6	
Ain't No Mo'	2023	0	6	
Almost Famous	2023	0	1	
Between Riverside and Crazy	2023	0	2	
Camelot	2023	0	5	
Cost of Living	2023	0	5	
Death of a Salesman	2023	0	2	
Fat Ham	2023	0	5	
Good Night, Oscar	2023	1	3	
Into the Woods	2023	0	6	
KPOP	2023	0	3	
Life of Pi	2023	3	5	
New York, New York	2023	1	9	
Ohio State Murders	2023	0	1	
Prima Facie	2023	1	4	
Shucked	2023	1	9	
Some Like It Hot	2023	4	13	
Summer, 1976	2023	0	1	
Sweeney Todd: The Demon Barber of Fleet Street	2023	2	8	
The Piano Lesson	2023	0	2	
The Sign in Sidney Brustein's Window	2023	1	2	
**Stereophonic**	2024	5	13	
**The Outsiders**	2024	4	12	
**Appropriate**	2024	3	8	
**Merrily We Roll Along**	2024	4	7	
An Enemy of the People	2024	1	5	
Back to the Future: The Musical	2024	0	2	
Cabaret at the Kit Kat Club	2024	1	9	
Days of Wine and Roses	2024	0	3	
Doubt: A Parable	2024	0	3	
Grey House	2024	0	2	
Gutenberg! The Musical!	2024	0	1	
Hell's Kitchen	2024	2	13	
Here Lies Love	2024	0	4	
Illinoise	2024	1	4	
Jaja's African Hair Braiding	2024	1	5	
Lempicka	2024	0	3	
Mary Jane	2024	0	4	
Monty Python's Spamalot	2024	0	1	
Mother Play	2024	0	4	
Patriots	2024	0	1	
Prayer for the French Republic	2024	0	3	
Purlie Victorious	2024	1	6	
Suffs	2024	2	6	
The Great Gatsby	2024	1	1	
The Notebook	2024	0	3	
The Who's Tommy	2024	0	1	
Uncle Vanya	2024	0	1	
Water for Elephants	2024	0	7	
**Purpose**	2025	2	6	
**Maybe Happy Ending**	2025	6	10	
**Eureka Day**	2025	1	2	
**Sunset Boulevard**	2025	3	7	
A Wonderful World	2025	0	1	
Boop! The Musical	2025	0	3	
Buena Vista Social Club	2025	4	10	
Dead Outlaw	2025	0	7	
Death Becomes Her	2025	1	10	
English	2025	0	5	
Floyd Collins	2025	0	6	
Glengarry Glen Ross	2025	0	1	
Good Night, and Good Luck	2025	0	5	
Gypsy	2025	0	5	
John Proctor is the Villain	2025	0	7	
Just in Time	2025	0	6	
Oh, Mary!	2025	2	5	
Operation Mincemeat	2025	1	4	
Pirates! The Penzance Musical	2025	0	1	
Real Women Have Curves	2025	0	2	
Romeo + Juliet	2025	0	4	
SMASH	2025	0	2	
Stranger Things: The First Shadow	2025	3	5	
Swept Away	2025	0	1	
The Hills of California	2025	0	7	
The Picture of Dorian Gray	2025	2	6	
The Roommate	2025	0	1	
Thornton Wilder's Our Town	2025	0	1	
Yellow Face	2025	1	3	
**Liberation**	2026	1	5	
**Schmigadoon!**	2026	4	12	
**Arthur Miller's Death of a Salesman**	2026	6	9	
**Ragtime**	2026	4	11	
August Wilson's Joe Turner's Come and Gone	2026	0	5	
Becky Shaw	2026	1	2	
Bug	2026	0	4	
Cats: The Jellicle Ball	2026	3	9	
Chess	2026	0	5	
Dog Day Afternoon	2026	0	3	
Every Brilliant Thing	2026	0	2	
Fallen Angels	2026	1	5	
Giant	2026	1	4	
Little Bear Ridge Road	2026	0	1	
Marjorie Prime	2026	0	2	
Oedipus	2026	1	7	
Punch	2026	0	1	
Richard O'Brien's The Rocky Horror Show	2026	0	9	
The Balusters	2026	0	5	
The Fear of 13	2026	0	2	
The Lost Boys	2026	4	12	
Titanique	2026	0	4	
Two Strangers (Carry a Cake Across New York)	2026	0	8	
Waiting for Godot	2026	0	1	

== Statistics ==
As of March 31, 2025

- Total number of productions: 1,732
- Total number of Play, Musical or Revival winners: 231
- Total number of awards ceremonies: 78
- Total number of nominations associated with a production: 6,248
- Total number of Tony Awards awarded: 1,601 Competitive

== Superlatives ==
- Production of a musical with the most awards: The Producers (55th Tony Awards) earned 12 Tony Awards.
- Production of a straight play with the most awards: The Coast of Utopia (61st Tony Awards) earned 7 Tony Awards.
- Musical with the most awards over multiple productions: South Pacific has earned 17 awards at the 3rd, 4th and 62nd Tony Awards.
- Straight play with the most awards over multiple productions: Death of a Salesman has earned 13 awards at the 3rd, 38th, 53rd and 66th Tony Awards.
- Production of a musical with the most nominations: Hamilton (70th Tony Awards) earned 16 Tony Award nominations.
- Production of a play with the most nominations: Stereophonic (77th Tony Awards) earned 13 Tony Award nominations.
- Musical with the most nominations over multiple productions: Cabaret has earned 36 nominations at the 21st, 42nd, 52nd, 68th and 77th Tony Awards.
- Straight play with the most nominations over multiple productions: Long Day's Journey Into Night has earned 24 nominations at the 11th, 40th, 57th and 70th Tony Awards.
- Production with the highest clean sweep: South Pacific (4th Tony Awards) won all Tony Awards with no other nominations.
- Production with the highest clean sweep since nominations were introduced: Carousel (48th Tony Awards), Titanic (51st Tony Awards), War Horse (65th Tony Awards) and A Christmas Carol (74th Tony Awards) won all 5 Tony Awards from its 5 nominations.
- Production with the most nominations without a single win: The Scottsboro Boys (65th Tony Awards), Mean Girls (72nd Tony Awards), and Slave Play (74th Tony Awards) (12 nominations each)
- Production with the most awards without winning Best Play, Musical or Revival: Follies (26th Tony Awards) won seven Tony Awards from its eleven nominations. It lost Best Musical to Two Gentlemen of Verona.
