= Tony Award for Best Director =

American theatre award for Broadway directors

- Awarded for: Best Director
- Location: New York City
- Presented by: American Theatre Wing The Broadway League
- Currently held by: Elia Kazan for J.B. (1959)
- Website: TonyAwards.com

The Tony Award for Best Director was one of the original 11 awards given in 1947 when the Tony Awards originated. The award was presented until 1960 when it was split into two categories: Tony Award for Best Direction of a Play and Tony Award for Best Direction of a Musical.

== Winners and nominees ==
indicates the winner

=== 1940s ===
Year	Director	Production
1947; 1st Tony Awards
1947; 1st Tony Awards	Elia Kazan	All My Sons
1948; 2nd Tony Awards
1948; 2nd Tony Awards	Joshua Logan	Mister Roberts
1949; 3rd Tony Awards
1949; 3rd Tony Awards	Elia Kazan	Death of a Salesman

=== 1950s ===
Year	Director	Production
1950; 4th Tony Awards
1950; 4th Tony Awards	Joshua Logan	South Pacific
1951; 5th Tony Awards
1951; 5th Tony Awards	George S. Kaufman	Guys and Dolls
1952; 6th Tony Awards
1952; 6th Tony Awards	José Ferrer	The Shrike, The Fourposter and Stalag 17
1953; 7th Tony Awards
1953; 7th Tony Awards	Joshua Logan	Picnic
1954; 8th Tony Awards
1954; 8th Tony Awards	Alfred Lunt	Ondine
1955; 9th Tony Awards
1955; 9th Tony Awards	Robert Montgomery	The Desperate Hours
1956; 10th Tony Awards
1956; 10th Tony Awards	Tyrone Guthrie	The Matchmaker
1956; 10th Tony Awards	Joseph Anthony	The Lark
1956; 10th Tony Awards	Harold Clurman	Bus Stop, Pipe Dream and Tiger at the Gates
1956; 10th Tony Awards	Tyrone Guthrie	The Matchmaker, Six Characters in Search of an Author and Tamburlaine the Great
1956; 10th Tony Awards	Garson Kanin	The Diary of Anne Frank
1956; 10th Tony Awards	Elia Kazan	Cat on a Hot Tin Roof
1956; 10th Tony Awards	Albert Marre	The Chalk Garden
1956; 10th Tony Awards	Herman Shumlin	Inherit the Wind
1957; 11th Tony Awards
1957; 11th Tony Awards	Moss Hart	My Fair Lady
1957; 11th Tony Awards	Joseph Anthony	A Clearing in the Woods and The Most Happy Fella
1957; 11th Tony Awards	Harold Clurman	The Waltz of the Toreadors
1957; 11th Tony Awards	Peter Glenville	Separate Lives
1957; 11th Tony Awards	José Quintero	Long Day's Journey into Night
1958; 12th Tony Awards
1958; 12th Tony Awards	Vincent J. Donehue	Sunrise at Campobello
1958; 12th Tony Awards	Morton DaCosta	The Music Man
1958; 12th Tony Awards	Peter Hall	The Rope Dancers
1958; 12th Tony Awards	George Roy Hill	Look Homeward, Angel
1958; 12th Tony Awards	Elia Kazan	The Dark at the Top of the Stairs
1958; 12th Tony Awards	Arthur Penn	Two for the Seesaw
1959; 13th Tony Awards
1959; 13th Tony Awards	Elia Kazan	J.B.
1959; 13th Tony Awards	Peter Brook	The Visit
1959; 13th Tony Awards	Robert Dhéry	La Plume de Ma Tante
1959; 13th Tony Awards	William Gaskill	Epitaph for George Dillon
1959; 13th Tony Awards	Peter Glenville	Rashomon
1959; 13th Tony Awards	Cyril Ritchard	The Pleasure of His Company
1959; 13th Tony Awards	Dore Schary	A Majority of One

== Award records ==
=== Multiple wins ===
3 Wins

- Elia Kazan
- Joshua Logan

=== Multiple nominations ===
5 Nominations

- Elia Kazan

3 Nominations

- Joshua Logan

2 Nominations

- Joseph Anthony
- Harold Clurman
- Peter Glenville
- Tyrone Guthrie

== See also ==
- Tony Award for Best Direction of a Musical
- Tony Award for Best Direction of a Play
- Drama Desk Award for Outstanding Director of a Musical
- Drama Desk Award for Outstanding Director of a Play
- Laurence Olivier Award for Best Director
- List of Tony Award-nominated productions
