= Regional Theatre Tony Award =

Special recognition Tony award

- Awarded for: Regional Theatre Tony Award
- Location: New York City, United States
- Presented by: American Theatre Wing The Broadway League
- Currently held by: American Players Theatre in Spring Green, Wisconsin (2026)
- Website: TonyAwards.com

The Regional Theatre Tony Award is a special recognition Tony Award given annually to a regional theater company in the United States. The winner is recommended by a committee of drama critics.

== Background ==
Initially presented in 1948 to Robert Porterfield of the Virginia Barter Theatre for their Contribution To Development Of Regional Theatre, the Regional Theatre awards were next presented starting in 1976. The award is "based on a recommendation by the American Theatre Critics Association", and includes a grant of $25,000. As the American Theatre Critics Association has noted, no theater has won the award more than once, "testifying to the growing strength of professional theater nationwide." One of the objects of the award is promoting what often amounts to the incubators of new productions.

In June 2013, the Tony Awards Administration Committee stated that effective with the 2013-14 season, "New York-based theatre companies will be eligible to receive the Regional Theatre Award." The Broadway League and American Theatre Wing, in a joint statement, explained: "New York has some of the most prestigious and creative theatre groups in the country and we are thrilled to include the New York theatre community in this category."

== Award winners ==
=== 1940s ===
Year	Theatre	City	State	Notes
1948; 2nd Tony Awards	Barter Theatre	Abingdon	Virginia	

=== 1970s ===
Year	Theatre	City	State	Notes
1976; 30th Tony Awards	Arena Stage	Washington	D.C.	"This award takes note of the company's balanced program of distinguished revivals and a broad spectrum of new works and American premieres of important foreign plays".
1977; 31st Tony Awards	Mark Taper Forum	Los Angeles	California	—N/a
1978; 32nd Tony Awards	Long Wharf Theatre	New Haven	Connecticut	—N/a
1979; 33rd Tony Awards	American Conservatory Theater	San Francisco	California	—N/a

=== 1980s ===
Year	Theatre	City	State	Notes
1980; 34th Tony Awards	Actors Theatre of Louisville	Louisville	Kentucky	—N/a
1981; 35th Tony Awards	Trinity Repertory Company	Providence	Rhode Island	—N/a
1982; 36th Tony Awards	Guthrie Theater	Minneapolis	Minnesota	—N/a
1983; 37th Tony Awards	Oregon Shakespeare Festival	Ashland	Oregon	—N/a
1984; 38th Tony Awards	Old Globe Theatre	San Diego	California	—N/a
1985; 39th Tony Awards	Steppenwolf Theatre Company	Chicago	Illinois	—N/a
1986; 40th Tony Awards	American Repertory Theater	Cambridge	Massachusetts	—N/a
1987; 41st Tony Awards	San Francisco Mime Troupe	San Francisco	California	—N/a
1988; 42nd Tony Awards	South Coast Repertory	Costa Mesa	California	—N/a
1989; 43rd Tony Awards	Hartford Stage	Hartford	Connecticut	—N/a

=== 1990s ===
Year	Theatre	City	State	Notes
1990; 44th Tony Awards	Seattle Repertory Theatre	Seattle	Washington	—N/a
1991; 45th Tony Awards	Yale Repertory Theatre	New Haven	Connecticut	—N/a
1992; 46th Tony Awards	Goodman Theatre	Chicago	Illinois	—N/a
1993; 47th Tony Awards	La Jolla Playhouse	San Diego	California	—N/a
1994; 48th Tony Awards	McCarter Theatre	Princeton	New Jersey	—N/a
1995; 49th Tony Awards	Goodspeed Opera House	East Haddam	Connecticut	—N/a
1996; 50th Tony Awards	Alley Theatre	Houston	Texas	—N/a
1997; 51st Tony Awards	Berkeley Repertory Theatre	Berkeley	California	—N/a
1998; 52nd Tony Awards	Denver Center Theatre Company	Denver	Colorado	—N/a
1999; 53rd Tony Awards	Crossroads Theatre	New Brunswick	New Jersey	—N/a

=== 2000s ===
Year	Theatre	City	State	Notes
2000; 54th Tony Awards	Utah Shakespearean Festival	Cedar City	Utah	—N/a
2001; 55th Tony Awards	Victory Gardens Theater	Chicago	Illinois	—N/a
2002; 56th Tony Awards	Williamstown Theatre Festival	Williamstown	Massachusetts	—N/a
2003; 57th Tony Awards	Children's Theatre Company	Minneapolis	Minnesota	—N/a
2004; 58th Tony Awards	Cincinnati Playhouse in the Park	Cincinnati	Ohio	—N/a
2005; 59th Tony Awards	Theatre de la Jeune Lune	Minneapolis	Minnesota	—N/a
2006; 60th Tony Awards	Intiman Playhouse	Seattle	Washington	—N/a
2007; 61st Tony Awards	Alliance Theatre	Atlanta	Georgia	—N/a
2008; 62nd Tony Awards	Chicago Shakespeare Theater	Chicago	Illinois	—N/a
2009; 63rd Tony Awards	Signature Theatre	Arlington County	Virginia	—N/a

=== 2010s ===
Year	Theatre	City	State	Notes
2010; 64th Tony Awards	Eugene O'Neill Theatre Center	Waterford	Connecticut	—N/a
2011; 65th Tony Awards	Lookingglass Theatre Company	Chicago	Illinois	—N/a
2012; 66th Tony Awards	Shakespeare Theatre Company	Washington	D.C.	—N/a
2013; 67th Tony Awards	Huntington Theatre Company	Boston	Massachusetts	
2014; 68th Tony Awards	Signature Theatre Company	New York City	New York	This is the first Manhattan-based theatre company to receive the award.
2015; 69th Tony Awards	Cleveland Play House	Cleveland	Ohio	—N/a
2016; 70th Tony Awards	Paper Mill Playhouse	Millburn	New Jersey	
2017; 71st Tony Awards	Dallas Theater Center	Dallas	Texas	
2018; 72nd Tony Awards	La MaMa Experimental Theatre Club	New York City	New York	—N/a
2019; 73rd Tony Awards	TheatreWorks Silicon Valley	Palo Alto	California	

=== 2020s ===
Year	Theatre	City	State	Notes
2020	Cancelled			
2021; 74th Tony Awards	None			
2022; 75th Tony Awards	Court Theatre	Chicago	Illinois	
2023; 76th Tony Awards	Pasadena Playhouse	Pasadena	California	
2024; 77th Tony Awards	Wilma Theater	Philadelphia	Pennsylvania	
2025; 78th Tony Awards	The Muny	St. Louis	Missouri	
2026; 79th Tony Awards	American Players Theatre	Spring Green	Wisconsin	

== See also ==
- Special Tony Award
- Tony Honors for Excellence in Theatre
- Isabelle Stevenson Award
