= 44th Tony Awards =

1990 US theatrical awards ceremony

- Official poster for the 44th annual Tony Awards
- Date: June 3, 1990
- Location: Lunt-Fontanne Theatre, New York City, New York
- Hosted by: Kathleen Turner
- Most wins: City of Angels (6)
- Most nominations: Grand Hotel (12)

Television/radio coverage
- Network: CBS

The 44th Annual Tony Awards to honor achievement in Broadway theatre was held on June 3, 1990, at the Lunt-Fontanne Theatre and broadcast by CBS television. The hostess was Kathleen Turner.

== Eligibility ==
Shows that opened on Broadway during the 1989–1990 season before May 16, 1990 are eligible.

Original plays

- Accomplice
- Artist Descending a Staircase
- The Cemetery Club
- A Few Good Men
- The Grapes of Wrath
- Lettice and Lovage
- Love Letters
- Mastergate
- Prelude to a Kiss
- The Piano Lesson
- The Secret Rapture
- Sid Caesar & Company
- Some Americans Abroad
- Tru
- Zoyka's Apartment

Original musicals

- Aspects of Love
- A Change in the Heir
- City of Angels
- Dangerous Games
- Grand Hotel
- Meet Me in St. Louis
- Oba Oba '90
- Prince of Central Park
- Truly Blessed

Play revivals

- Cat on a Hot Tin Roof
- The Circle
- The Merchant of Venice
- Miss Margarida's Way
- Orpheus Descending
- The Tenth Man

Musical revivals

- Gypsy
- Shenandoah
- Sweeney Todd: The Demon Barber of Fleet Street
- The Threepenny Opera

== The ceremony ==
The theme, "The Year of the Actor," featured classic monologues from As You Like It (Morgan Freeman); Hamlet (Kevin Kline); Long Day's Journey Into Night (Len Cariou); The Royal Family (Geraldine Fitzgerald); The Tempest (Philip Bosco).

Presenters and performers included Philip Bosco, Matthew Broderick, Len Cariou, Dixie Carter, Michael Crawford, Sandy Duncan, Morgan Freeman, Helen Hayes, Dustin Hoffman, James Earl Jones, Kevin Kline, Linda Lavin, Bernadette Peters, Christopher Reeve, Joan Rivers, Ron Silver, Jessica Tandy, and Lily Tomlin.

Musicals and Plays represented:

- Aspects of Love ("Love Changes Everything" - Company)
- City of Angels ("What You Don't Know About Women" - Kay McClelland and Randy Graff / "You're Nothing Without Me" - Gregg Edelman and James Naughton)
- Grand Hotel ("We'll Take a Glass Together" - Michael Jeter, Brent Barrett and Company)
- Meet Me in St. Louis ("Banjos"/"The Boy Next Door"/"The Trolley Song"/"Meet Me in St. Louis"- Company)
- The Grapes of Wrath (Scene with Gary Sinise, Lois Smith and Company)
- Lettice and Lovage (Scene with Maggie Smith and Margaret Tyzack)
- The Piano Lesson (Scene with the company)
- Prelude to a Kiss (Scene with Timothy Hutton, Mary-Louise Parker, Barnard Hughes and Company)

== Winners and nominees ==
Winners are in bold

Best Play	Best Musical
**The Grapes of Wrath – Frank Galati**; Lettice and Lovage – Peter Shaffer; Prelude to a Kiss – Craig Lucas; The Piano Lesson – August Wilson	**City of Angels**; Aspects of Love; Grand Hotel; Meet Me in St. Louis
Best Revival	Best Book of a Musical
**Gypsy**; Sweeney Todd; The Circle; The Merchant of Venice	**Larry Gelbart – City of Angels**; Andrew Lloyd Webber – Aspects of Love; Luther Davis – Grand Hotel; Hugh Wheeler – Meet Me in St. Louis
Best Performance by a Leading Actor in a Play	Best Performance by a Leading Actress in a Play
**Robert Morse – Tru as Truman Capote**; Charles S. Dutton – The Piano Lesson as Boy Willie; Dustin Hoffman – The Merchant of Venice as Shylock; Tom Hulce – A Few Good Men as Lieutenant Daniel Kaffee, USN, JAG Corps	**Maggie Smith – Lettice and Lovage as Lettice Douffet**; Geraldine James – The Merchant of Venice as Portia; Mary-Louise Parker – Prelude to a Kiss as Rita Boyle; Kathleen Turner – Cat on a Hot Tin Roof as Maggie Pollitt
Best Performance by a Leading Actor in a Musical	Best Performance by a Leading Actress in a Musical
**James Naughton – City of Angels as Stone**; David Carroll – Grand Hotel as Felix Von Gaigern; Gregg Edelman – City of Angels as Stine; Bob Gunton – Sweeney Todd as Sweeney Todd	**Tyne Daly – Gypsy as Mama Rose**; Georgia Brown – The Threepenny Opera as Celia Peachum; Beth Fowler – Sweeney Todd as Mrs. Lovett; Liliane Montevecchi – Grand Hotel as Elizaveta Grushinskaya
Best Performance by a Featured Actor in a Play	Best Performance by a Featured Actress in a Play
**Charles Durning – Cat on a Hot Tin Roof as Big Daddy**; Rocky Carroll – The Piano Lesson as Lymon; Terry Kinney – The Grapes of Wrath as Jim Casy; Gary Sinise – The Grapes of Wrath as Tom Joad	**Margaret Tyzack – Lettice and Lovage as Lotte Schoen**; Polly Holliday – Cat on a Hot Tin Roof as Big Mama; S. Epatha Merkerson – The Piano Lesson as Berniece; Lois Smith – The Grapes of Wrath as Ma
Best Performance by a Featured Actor in a Musical	Best Performance by a Featured Actress in a Musical
**Michael Jeter – Grand Hotel as Otto Kringelein**; René Auberjonois – City of Angels as Buddy Fidler/Irwin S. Irving; Kevin Colson – Aspects of Love as George Dillingham; Jonathan Hadary – Gypsy as Herbie	**Randy Graff – City of Angels as Oolie/Donna**; Jane Krakowski – Grand Hotel as Freida Flamm/Flaemmchen; Kathleen Rowe McAllen – Aspects of Love as Giulietta Trapani; Crista Moore – Gypsy as Louise
Best Original Score (Music and/or Lyrics) Written for the Theatre	Best Choreography
**City of Angels** – Cy Coleman (music) David Zippel (lyrics); Aspects of Love – Andrew Lloyd Webber (music) Don Black and Charles Hart (lyrics); Grand Hotel – Robert Wright, George Forrest and Maury Yeston (music and lyrics); Meet Me in St. Louis – Hugh Martin and Ralph Blane (music and lyrics)	**Tommy Tune – Grand Hotel**; Joan Brickhill – Meet Me in St. Louis; Graciela Daniele and Tina Paul – Dangerous Games
Best Direction of a Play	Best Direction of a Musical
**Frank Galati – The Grapes of Wrath**; Michael Blakemore – Lettice and Lovage; Peter Hall – The Merchant of Venice; Lloyd Richards – The Piano Lesson	**Tommy Tune – Grand Hotel**; Michael Blakemore – City of Angels; Trevor Nunn – Aspects of Love; Susan H. Schulman – Sweeney Todd
Best Scenic Design	Best Costume Design
**Robin Wagner – City of Angels**; Alexandra Byrne – Some Americans Abroad; Kevin Rigdon – The Grapes of Wrath; Tony Walton – Grand Hotel	**Santo Loquasto – Grand Hotel**; Theoni V. Aldredge – Gypsy; Florence Klotz – City of Angels; Erin Quigley – The Grapes of Wrath
Best Lighting Design
**Jules Fisher – Grand Hotel**; Paul Gallo – City of Angels; Paul Pyant and Neil Peter Jampolis – Orpheus Descending; Kevin Rigdon – The Grapes of Wrath

== Special awards ==
The Regional Theatre Award was presented to the Seattle Repertory Theatre. The Tony Honor Award was presented to Alfred Drake for Excellence in the Theatre.

=== Multiple nominations and awards ===
These productions had multiple nominations:

- 12 nominations: Grand Hotel
- 11 nominations: City of Angels
- 8 nominations: The Grapes of Wrath
- 6 nominations: Aspects of Love
- 5 nominations: Gypsy and The Piano Lesson
- 4 nominations: Lettice and Lovage, Meet Me in St. Louis, The Merchant of Venice and Sweeney Todd
- 3 nominations: Cat on a Hot Tin Roof
- 2 nominations: Prelude to a Kiss

The following productions received multiple awards.

- 6 wins: City of Angels
- 5 wins: Grand Hotel
- 2 wins: The Grapes of Wrath, Gypsy and Lettice and Lovage

== See also ==
- Drama Desk Awards
- 1990 Laurence Olivier Awards – equivalent awards for West End theatre productions
- Obie Award
- New York Drama Critics' Circle
- Theatre World Award
- Lucille Lortel Awards
