= Tony Award for Best Revival =

American theatre award for Broadway

- Awarded for: Best Revival
- Location: United States New York City
- Presented by: American Theatre Wing The Broadway League
- Website: TonyAwards.com

The Tony Award for Best Revival was given to the best play, musical or non-musical, which had already appeared on Broadway in a previous production. It was presented from 1977, where it was called Most Innovative Production of a Revival and later Reproduction (Play or Musical) in 1980, until 1994, when it was split into the Best Revival of a Musical and the Best Revival of a Play.

If there are not enough revivals, it is possible under the current Tony rules for this category to return. Any time there are three play revivals and three musical revivals, the categories are automatically separated; if there are fewer, the Tony Awards Administration Committee may still choose to split up the categories.

== Winners and nominees ==
Bold indicates the winner

=== 1970s ===
Year	Production	Nominees
Best Revival
**1977** (31st)
**1977** (31st)	**Porgy and Bess**	Produced by Sherwin M. Goldman and Houston Grand Opera
**1977** (31st)	Guys and Dolls	Produced by Moe Septee in association with Victor H. Potamkin, Carmen F. Zollo, and Ashton Springer
**1977** (31st)	The Cherry Orchard	Produced by Joseph Papp
**1977** (31st)	The Threepenny Opera	Produced by Joseph Papp
**1978** (32nd)
**1978** (32nd)	**Dracula**	Produced by Jujamcyn Theaters, Elizabeth I. McCann, John Wulp, Victor Lurie, Nelle Nugent, and Max Weitzenhoffer
**1978** (32nd)	Tartuffe	Produced by Circle in the Square
**1978** (32nd)	Timbuktu!	Produced by Luther Davis
**1978** (32nd)	A Touch of the Poet	Produced by Elliot Martin

=== 1980s ===
Year	Production	Nominees
**1980** (34th)
**1980** (34th)	**Morning's at Seven**	Produced by Elizabeth I. McCann, Nelle Nugent and Ray Larson
**1980** (34th)	Major Barbara	Produced by Circle in the Square
**1980** (34th)	Peter Pan	Produced by Zev Bufman
**1980** (34th)	West Side Story	Produced by Gladys Rackmil, the Kennedy Center, James M. Nederlander and Ruth Mitchell
**1981** (35th)
**1981** (35th)	**The Pirates of Penzance**	Produced by Joseph Papp and The New York Shakespeare Festival
**1981** (35th)	Brigadoon	Produced by Zev Bufman and The Shubert Organization
**1981** (35th)	Camelot	Produced by Mike Merrick and Don Gregory
**1981** (35th)	The Little Foxes	Produced by Zev Bufman, Donald C. Carter and Jon Cultler
**1982** (36th)
**1982** (36th)	**Othello**	Produced by Barry and Fran Weissler and CBS Video Enterprises
**1982** (36th)	Medea	Produced by Barry and Fran Weissler, The Kennedy Center and Bunny and Warren Austin
**1982** (36th)	My Fair Lady	Produced by Mike Merrick and Don Gregory
**1982** (36th)	A Taste of Honey	Produced by Roundabout Theatre Co., Gene Feist and Michael Fried
**1983** (37th)
**1983** (37th)	**On Your Toes**	Produced by Alfred de Liagre, Jr., Roger L. Stevens, John Mauceri, Donald R. Seawell and Andre Pastoria
**1983** (37th)	All's Well That Ends Well	Produced by the Royal Shakespeare Company
**1983** (37th)	The Caine Mutiny Court-Martial	Produced by Circle in the Square Theatre and The Kennedy Center
**1983** (37th)	A View from the Bridge	Produced by Zev Bufman and Sidney Schlenker
**1984** (38th)
**1984** (38th)	**Death of a Salesman**	Produced by Robert Whitehead and Roger L. Stevens
**1984** (38th)	American Buffalo	Produced by Elliot Martin and Arnold Bernhard
**1984** (38th)	Heartbreak House	Produced by Circle in the Square
**1984** (38th)	A Moon for the Misbegotten	Produced by The Shubert Organization and Emanuel Azenberg
**1985** (39th)
**1985** (39th)	**Joe Egg**	Produced by The Shubert Organization, Emanuel Azenberg, Roger Berlind, Ivan Bloch and MTM Enterprises, Inc.
**1985** (39th)	Cyrano de Bergerac	Produced by James M. Nederlander, Elizabeth I. McCann, Nelle Nugent, Cynthia Wood, Dale Duffy, and Allan Carr
**1985** (39th)	Much Ado About Nothing	Produced by James M. Nederlander, Elizabeth I. McCann, Nelle Nugent, Cynthia Wood, Dale Duffy and Allan Carr
**1985** (39th)	Strange Interlude	Produced by Robert Michael Geisler, John Roberdeau, Douglas Urbanski, James M. Nederlander, Duncan C. Weldon, Paul Gregg, Lionel Becker and Jerome Minskoff
**1986** (40th)
**1986** (40th)	**Sweet Charity**	Produced by Jerome Minskoff, James M. Nederlander, Arthur Rubin and Joseph Harris
**1986** (40th)	Hay Fever	Produced by Roger Peters and MBS Co.
**1986** (40th)	The Iceman Cometh	Produced by Lewis Allen, James M. Nederlander, Stephen Graham and Ben Edwards
**1986** (40th)	Loot	Produced by the David Merrick Arts Foundation, Charles P. Kopelman and Mark Simon
**1987** (41st)
**1987** (41st)	**All My Sons**	Produced by Jay H. Fuchs, Steven Warnick, and Charles Patsos
**1987** (41st)	The Front Page	Produced by Lincoln Center Theatre, Gregory Mosher, and Bernard Gersten
**1987** (41st)	The Life and Adventures of Nicholas Nickleby	Produced by The Shubert Organization, Three Knights, Ltd., and Robert Fox, Ltd.
**1987** (41st)	Pygmalion	Produced by The Shubert Organization, Jerome Minskoff, and Duncan C. Weldon
**1988** (42nd)
**1988** (42nd)	**Anything Goes**	Produced by Lincoln Center Theater, Gregory Mosher, and Bernard Gersten
**1988** (42nd)	Cabaret	Produced by Barry Weissler and Fran Weissler
**1988** (42nd)	Dreamgirls	Produced by Marvin A. Krauss and Irving Siders
**1988** (42nd)	A Streetcar Named Desire	Produced by Circle in the Square, Theodore Mann, and Paul Libin
**1989** (43rd)
**1989** (43rd)	**Our Town**	Produced by Lincoln Center Theatre, Gregory Mosher, and Bernard Gersten
**1989** (43rd)	Ah, Wilderness!	Produced by Ken Marsolis, Alexander H. Cohen, The Kennedy Center for the Performing Arts, The Yale Repertory Theater, Richard Norton, Irma Oestreicher, and Elizabeth D. White
**1989** (43rd)	Ain't Misbehavin'	Produced by The Shubert Organization, Emanuel Azenberg, Dasha Epstein, and Roger Berlind
**1989** (43rd)	Cafe Crown	Produced by LeFrak Entertainment, James M. Nederlander, Francine LeFrak, James L. Nederlander, and Arthur Rubin

=== 1990s ===
Year	Production	Nominees
**1990** (44th)
**1990** (44th)	**Gypsy**	Produced by Barry and Fran Weissler, Kathy Levin, and Barry Brown
**1990** (44th)	The Circle	Produced by Elliot Martin, The Shubert Organization, and Suntory International Corp
**1990** (44th)	The Merchant of Venice	Produced by Duncan C. Weldon, Jerome Minskoff, Punch Productions and Peter Hall
**1990** (44th)	Sweeney Todd	Produced by Circle in the Square Theatre, Theodore Mann, and Paul Libin
**1991** (45th)
**1991** (45th)	**Fiddler on the Roof**	Produced by Barry and Fran Weissler and Pace Theatrical Group
**1991** (45th)	The Miser	Produced by Circle in the Square Theatre, Theodore Mann, and Paul Libin
**1991** (45th)	Peter Pan	Produced by James M. Nederlander, Arthur Rubin, Thomas P. McCoy, Keith Stava, PP Investments, Inc., and John. B. Platt
**1992** (46th)
**1992** (46th)	**Guys and Dolls**	Produced by Dodger Productions, Roger Berlind, Jujamcyn Theaters/TV Asahi, Kardana Productions, and the John F. Kennedy Center for the Performing Arts]
**1992** (46th)	The Most Happy Fella	Produced by the Goodspeed Opera House, Center Theatre Group/Ahmanson Theatre, Lincoln Center Theatre, The Shubert Organization, and Japan Satellite Broadcasting/Stagevision
**1992** (46th)	On Borrowed Time	Produced by Circle in the Square Theatre, Theodore Mann, Robert Buckley, and Paul Libin
**1992** (46th)	The Visit	Produced by Roundabout Theater Company, Todd Haimes, and Gene Feist
**1993** (47th)
**1993** (47th)	**Anna Christie**	Produced by Roundabout Theater Co., and Todd Haimes
**1993** (47th)	Saint Joan	Produced by National Actors Theatre, Tony Randall, and Duncan C. Weldon
**1993** (47th)	The Price	Produced by Roundabout Theatre Co., and Todd Haimes
**1993** (47th)	Wilder, Wilder, Wilder	Produced by Circle in the Square Theatre, Theodore Mann, George Elmer, Paul Libin, Willow Cabin Theatre Company, Edward Berkeley, Adam Oliensis, and Maria Radman

== See also ==
- Drama Desk Award for Outstanding Revival
- Drama Desk Award for Outstanding Revival of a Musical
- Drama Desk Award for Outstanding Revival of a Play
- Laurence Olivier Award for Best Musical Revival
- Laurence Olivier Award for Best Revival
- List of Tony Award-nominated productions
