= 46th Tony Awards =

1992 US theatrical awards ceremony

- Official poster for the 46th annual Tony Awards
- Date: May 31, 1992
- Location: Gershwin Theatre, New York City, New York
- Hosted by: Glenn Close
- Most wins: Guys and Dolls (4)
- Most nominations: Jelly's Last Jam (11)

Television/radio coverage
- Network: CBS

The 46th Annual Tony Awards was broadcast by CBS from the Gershwin Theatre on May 31, 1992. The host was Glenn Close.

== Eligibility ==
Shows that opened on Broadway during the 1991–1992 season before May 5, 1992 are eligible.

Original plays

- A Christmas Carol
- Conversations with My Father
- Crazy He Calls Me
- Dancing at Lughnasa
- Death and the Maiden
- Four Baboons Adoring the Sun
- Jake's Women
- A Little Hotel on the Side
- Park Your Car in Harvard Yard
- Search and Destroy
- Shimada
- A Small Family Business
- Two Shakespearean Actors
- Two Trains Running

Original musicals

- Catskills on Broadway
- Crazy for You
- Falsettos
- Five Guys Named Moe
- Jelly's Last Jam
- Metro
- Nick & Nora
- The High Rollers Social and Pleasure Club

Play revivals

- The Crucible
- Getting Married
- Hamlet
- The Homecoming
- The Master Builder
- On Borrowed Time
- Private Lives
- A Streetcar Named Desire
- The Visit

Musical revivals

- Guys and Dolls
- Man of La Mancha
- The Most Happy Fella

== The ceremony ==
Presenters:

- Alan Alda
- Alec Baldwin
- Carol Channing
- Kirk Douglas
- Michael Douglas
- Richard Dreyfuss
- Daisy Eagan
- Farrah Fawcett
- Vincent Gardenia
- Danny Gerard
- Danny Glover
- Gene Hackman
- Judd Hirsch
- Patti LuPone
- Liza Minnelli
- Ian McKellen
- Tony Randall
- Lynn Redgrave
- Freddie Roman
- Ron Silver
- Sigourney Weaver

Musicals represented:

- Crazy for You ("I Can't Be Bothered Now"/"Slap That Bass"/"Shall We Dance"/"I Got Rhythm" - Company)
- Falsettos ("Falsettoland"/"My Father's A Homo"/"Sitting Watching Jason Play Baseball" - Company)
- Five Guys Named Moe ("Five Guys Named Moe"/"Caledonia" - Company)
- Jelly's Last Jam ("That's How You Jazz" - Gregory Hines and Company)

Special Salute to Frank Loesser:

- The Most Happy Fella ("Happy to Make Your Acquaintance" - Spiro Malas, Sophie Hayden and Liz Larsen)
- Guys and Dolls ("Sit Down You're Rockin' the Boat"/"Finale" - Company)

== Award winners and nominees ==
Winners are in bold

Best Play	Best Musical
**Dancing at Lughnasa – Brian Friel**; Four Baboons Adoring the Sun – John Guare; Two Shakespearean Actors – Richard Nelson; Two Trains Running – August Wilson	**Crazy for You**; Falsettos; Five Guys Named Moe; Jelly's Last Jam
Best Revival	Best Book of a Musical
**Guys and Dolls**; The Most Happy Fella; On Borrowed Time; The Visit	**William Finn and James Lapine – Falsettos**; Ken Ludwig – Crazy for You; Clarke Peters – Five Guys Named Moe; George C. Wolfe – Jelly's Last Jam
Best Performance by a Leading Actor in a Play	Best Performance by a Leading Actress in a Play
**Judd Hirsch – Conversations with My Father as Eddie**; Alan Alda – Jake's Women as Jake; Alec Baldwin – A Streetcar Named Desire as Stanley Kowalski; Brian Bedford – Two Shakespearean Actors as William Charles Macready	**Glenn Close – Death and the Maiden as Paulina Salas Escobar**; Jane Alexander – The Visit as Claire Zachanassian; Stockard Channing – Four Baboons Adoring the Sun as Penny McKenzie; Judith Ivey – Park Your Car in Harvard Yard as Kathleen Hogan
Best Performance by a Leading Actor in a Musical	Best Performance by a Leading Actress in a Musical
**Gregory Hines – Jelly's Last Jam as Jelly Roll Morton**; Harry Groener – Crazy for You as Bobby Child; Nathan Lane – Guys and Dolls as Nathan Detroit; Michael Rupert – Falsettos as Marvin	**Faith Prince – Guys and Dolls as Miss Adelaide**; Jodi Benson – Crazy for You as Polly Baker; Josie de Guzman – Guys and Dolls as Sarah Brown; Sophie Hayden – The Most Happy Fella as Rosabella
Best Performance by a Featured Actor in a Play	Best Performance by a Featured Actress in a Play
**Laurence Fishburne – Two Trains Running as Sterling**; Roscoe Lee Browne – Two Trains Running as Holloway; Željko Ivanek – Two Shakespearean Actors as John Ryder; Tony Shalhoub – Conversations with My Father as Charlie	**Brid Brennan – Dancing at Lughnasa as Agnes**; Rosaleen Linehan – Dancing at Lughnasa as Kate; Cynthia Martells – Two Trains Running as Risa; Dearbhla Molloy – Dancing at Lughnasa as Maggie
Best Performance by a Featured Actor in a Musical	Best Performance by a Featured Actress in a Musical
**Scott Waara – The Most Happy Fella as Herman**; Bruce Adler – Crazy for You as Bela Zangler; Keith David – Jelly's Last Jam as Chimney Man; Jonathan Kaplan – Falsettos as Jason	**Tonya Pinkins – Jelly's Last Jam as Anita**; Liz Larsen – The Most Happy Fella as Cleo; Vivian Reed – The High Rollers Social and Pleasure Club as Enchantress; Barbara Walsh – Falsettos as Trina
Best Original Score (Music and/or Lyrics) Written for the Theatre	Best Choreography
**Falsettos – William Finn (music and lyrics)**; Jelly's Last Jam – Jelly Roll Morton and Luther Henderson (music) and Susan Birkenhead (lyrics); Metro – Janusz Stoklosa (music) and Agata Miklaszewska, Maryna Miklaszewska and Mary Bracken Phillips (lyrics); Nick & Nora – Charles Strouse (music) and Richard Maltby Jr. (lyrics)	**Susan Stroman – Crazy for You**; Terry John Bates – Dancing at Lughnasa; Christopher Chadman – Guys and Dolls; Hope Clarke, Ted L. Levy, and Gregory Hines – Jelly's Last Jam
Best Direction of a Play	Best Direction of a Musical
**Patrick Mason – Dancing at Lughnasa**; Peter Hall – Four Baboons Adoring the Sun; Jack O'Brien – Two Shakespearean Actors; Daniel Sullivan – Conversations with My Father	**Jerry Zaks – Guys and Dolls**; James Lapine – Falsettos; Mike Ockrent – Crazy for You; George C. Wolfe – Jelly's Last Jam
Best Scenic Design	Best Costume Design
**Tony Walton – Guys and Dolls**; John Lee Beatty – A Small Family Business; Joe Vanek – Dancing at Lughnasa; Robin Wagner – Jelly's Last Jam	**William Ivey Long – Crazy for You**; Jane Greenwood – Two Shakespearean Actors; Toni-Leslie James – Jelly's Last Jam; Joe Vanek – Dancing at Lughnasa
Best Lighting Design
**Jules Fisher – Jelly's Last Jam**; Paul Gallo – Crazy for You; Paul Gallo – Guys and Dolls; Richard Pilbrow – Four Baboons Adoring the Sun

== Special Tony Awards ==
- Regional Theatre Award - The Goodman Theatre of Chicago
- Tony Honor - The Fantasticks

=== Multiple nominations and awards ===
These productions had multiple nominations:

- 11 nominations: Jelly's Last Jam
- 9 nominations: Crazy for You
- 8 nominations: Dancing at Lughnasa and Guys and Dolls
- 7 nominations: Falsettos
- 5 nominations: Two Shakespearean Actors
- 4 nominations: Four Baboons Adoring the Sun, The Most Happy Fella and Two Trains Running
- 3 nominations: Conversations with My Father
- 2 nominations: Five Guys Named Moe and The Visit

The following productions received multiple awards.

- 4 wins: Guys and Dolls
- 3 wins: Crazy for You, Dancing at Lughnasa and Jelly's Last Jam
- 2 wins: Falsettos

== See also ==
- Drama Desk Awards
- 1992 Laurence Olivier Awards – equivalent awards for West End theatre productions
- Obie Award
- New York Drama Critics' Circle
- Theatre World Award
- Lucille Lortel Awards
