= 4th Tony Awards =

1950 US theatrical awards ceremony

- Date: April 9, 1950
- Location: Waldorf-Astoria Hotel; New York City, New York
- Hosted by: Humphrey Bogart
- Most wins: South Pacific (9)

Television/radio coverage
- Network: WOR, Mutual Network

The 4th Annual Tony Awards were held on April 9, 1950, at the Waldorf-Astoria Grand Ballroom in New York City, and broadcast on radio station WOR and the Mutual Network. The host was James Sauter.

== Ceremony ==
Presenters were Helen Hayes (president of the American Theatre Wing) and Mrs. Martin Beck (chairman of the board), with a special presentation by Eleanor Roosevelt.

Performers were Yvonne Adair, Rod Alexander, John Conte, Richard Eastham, Adolph Green, Georges Guétary, Bambi Linn, Allyn McLerie, Lucy Monroe, Danny Scholl, Herb Shriner, William Tabbert, William Warfield, Lou Wills Jr., Julie Wilson, and Martha Wright.

== Award winners ==
Source:The New York Times

Note: nominees are not shown

=== Production ===
Award	Winner
Best Play	The Cocktail Party by T. S. Eliot. Produced by Gilbert Miller
Best Musical	South Pacific Music by Richard Rodgers, lyrics by Oscar Hammerstein II, book by Oscar Hammerstein II and Joshua Logan. Produced by Leland Hayward, Oscar Hammerstein II, Joshua Logan and Richard Rodgers.
Tony Award for Producers (Musical)	South Pacific Produced by Leland Hayward, Oscar Hammerstein II, Joshua Logan and Richard Rodgers.

=== Performance ===
Award	Winner
Actor-Play	Sidney Blackmer, Come Back, Little Sheba
Actress-Play	Shirley Booth, Come Back, Little Sheba
Actor-Musical	Ezio Pinza, South Pacific
Actress-Musical	Mary Martin, South Pacific
Tony Award for Actor, Supporting or Featured (Musical)	Myron McCormick, South Pacific
Tony Award for Actress, Supporting or Featured (Musical)	Juanita Hall, South Pacific

=== Craft ===
Award	Winner
Best Director	Joshua Logan, South Pacific
Choreographer	Helen Tamiris, Touch and Go
Tony Award for Libretto	Oscar Hammerstein II and Joshua Logan, South Pacific
Tony Award for Score	Richard Rodgers, South Pacific
Costume Designer	Aline Bernstein, Regina
Scenic Designer	Jo Mielziner, The Innocents
Tony Award for Best Conductor and Musical Director	Maurice Abravanel, Regina

== Special awards ==
- Maurice Evans, for work he did in guiding the City Center Theatre Company through a highly successful season
- Eleanor Roosevelt presented a special award to volunteer worker Philip Faversham of the American Theatre Wing's hospital program
- Brock Pemberton, founder of Tony Awards and its original chairman (posthumous)
- Stage Technician, Joe Lynn, master propertyman (Miss Liberty)

=== Multiple nominations and awards ===
The following productions received multiple awards.

- 9 wins: South Pacific
- 2 wins: Come Back, Little Sheba and Regina

== See also ==
- 22nd Academy Awards
