= Joe Vaněk =

Joe Vaněk is an opera designer and director. He began working in Ireland in 1984, where he became noted for his work on the plays of Brian Friel. Nominated for two Tony Awards on Broadway for his set of Dancing at Lughnasa he was Director of Design at Abbey Theatre from 1994 to 1997, designing sets of plays by the likes of Frank McGuinness, Tom Kilroy, Tom MacIntyre, Tom Murphy, and Hugh Leonard. Employed by Simpson Fox Associates, he has contributed to numerous productions in different theatres, including The Mines of Sulphur at the Wexford Festival Opera in 2008, and Medea at the Glimmerglass Festival Opera in 2011. He has also contributed to the Irish Museum of Modern Art with his knowledge of the history of stage scenery.
