= 32nd Tony Awards =

1978 US theatrical awards ceremony

- Date: June 4, 1978
- Location: Shubert Theatre, New York City, New York
- Most wins: On the Twentieth Century (5)
- Most nominations: On the Twentieth Century (9)

Television/radio coverage
- Network: CBS

The 32nd Annual Tony Awards was broadcast by CBS television on June 4, 1978, from the Shubert Theatre in New York City. This was the first time that CBS broadcast the ceremony, which had previously been shown on the ABC television network.

== Eligibility ==
Shows that opened on Broadway during the 1977–1978 season before May 15, 1978 are eligible.

Original plays

- 13 Rue de l'Amour
- An Almost Perfect Person
- Bully
- Chapter Two
- Cheaters
- Cold Storage
- A Condition of Shadow
- Da
- Deathtrap
- Diversions and Delights
- Do You Turn Somersaults?
- The Effect of Gamma Rays on Man-in-the-Moon Marigolds
- The Gin Game
- Golda
- The Merchant
- The Mighty Gents
- Miss Margarida's Way
- Mr. Happiness
- The Night of the Tribades
- The November People
- Patio
- Porch
- Paul Robeson
- Some of My Best Friends
- Stages
- The Water Engine

Original musicals

- The Act
- Ain't Misbehavin'
- Angel
- Beatlemania
- Dancin'
- A History of the American Film
- On the Twentieth Century
- Runaways
- Working

Play revivals

- Dracula
- The Importance of Being Earnest
- Saint Joan
- Tartuffe
- A Touch of the Poet

Musical revivals

- Hair
- Hello, Dolly!
- Jesus Christ Superstar
- Man of La Mancha
- Timbuktu!

== The ceremony ==
Presenters were Ed Asner, Mikhail Baryshnikov, Carol Channing, Bonnie Franklin, Robert Guillaume, Julie Harris, Helen Hayes, Bob Hope, Gene Kelly, Linda Lavin, Jack Lemmon, Hal Linden, Roy Scheider and Dick Van Patten.

Bonnie Franklin introduced each segment from her seat in the audience. Bob Hope presented the "Lawrence Langer" Special Award to Irving Berlin, who was not present at the ceremony. The theme of the ceremony was "footlights", with each presenter telling of the first time they saw live theatre.

Musicals represented:

- The Act ("City Lights" – Liza Minnelli and Company)
- Ain't Misbehavin' ("Ladies Who Sing with the Band"/"Off Time" – Company)
- Dancin' ("Sing, Sing, Sing" – Company)
- On the Twentieth Century ("On The Twentieth Century" – Company)
- Runaways (Medley – Company)

== Winners and nominees ==
Winners are in bold

Best Play	Best Musical
**Da – Hugh Leonard**; Chapter Two – Neil Simon; Deathtrap – Ira Levin; The Gin Game – D. L. Coburn	**Ain't Misbehavin'**; Dancin'; On the Twentieth Century; Runaways
Most Innovative Production of a Revival	Best Book of a Musical
**Dracula**; Tartuffe; Timbuktu!; A Touch of the Poet	**Betty Comden and Adolph Green – On the Twentieth Century**; Christopher Durang – A History of the American Film; Elizabeth Swados – Runaways; Stephen Schwartz – Working
Best Performance by a Leading Actor in a Play	Best Performance by a Leading Actress in a Play
**Barnard Hughes – Da as Da**; Hume Cronyn – The Gin Game as Weller Martin; Frank Langella – Dracula as Dracula; Jason Robards – A Touch of the Poet as Cornelius Melody	**Jessica Tandy – The Gin Game as Fonsia Dorsey**; Anne Bancroft – Golda as Golda Meir; Anita Gillette – Chapter Two as Jennie Maclaine; Estelle Parsons – Miss Margarida's Way as Miss Margarida
Best Performance by a Leading Actor in a Musical	Best Performance by a Leading Actress in a Musical
**John Cullum – On the Twentieth Century as Oscar Jaffee**; Eddie Bracken – Hello, Dolly! as Horace Vandergelder; Barry Nelson – The Act as Dan Conners; Gilbert Price – Timbuktu! as The Mansa of Mali	**Liza Minnelli – The Act as Michelle Craig**; Madeline Kahn – On the Twentieth Century as Lily Garland/Mildred Plotka; Eartha Kitt – Timbuktu! as Shaleem La Lume; Frances Sternhagen – Angel as Eliza Gant
Best Performance by a Featured Actor in a Play	Best Performance by a Featured Actress in a Play
**Lester Rawlins – Da as Drumm**; Morgan Freeman – The Mighty Gents as Zeke; Victor Garber – Deathtrap as Clifford Anderson; Cliff Gorman – Chapter Two as Leo Schneider	**Ann Wedgeworth – Chapter Two as Faye Medwick**; Starletta DuPois – The Mighty Gents as Rita; Swoosie Kurtz – Tartuffe as Mariane; Marian Seldes – Deathtrap as Myra Bruhl
Best Performance by a Featured Actor in a Musical	Best Performance by a Featured Actress in a Musical
**Kevin Kline – On the Twentieth Century as Bruce Granit**; Steven Boockvor – Working as John Fortune/Marco Camerone; Wayne Cilento – Dancin' as Performer; Rex Everhart – Working as Herb Rosen/Booker Page	**Nell Carter – Ain't Misbehavin' as Nell**; Imogene Coca – On the Twentieth Century as Letitia Primrose; Ann Reinking – Dancin' as Various Characters; Charlayne Woodard – Ain't Misbehavin' as Charlaine
Best Direction of a Play	Best Direction of a Musical
**Melvin Bernhardt – Da**; Robert Moore – Deathtrap; Mike Nichols – The Gin Game; Dennis Rosa – Dracula	**Richard Maltby, Jr. – Ain't Misbehavin'**; Bob Fosse – Dancin'; Harold Prince – On the Twentieth Century; Elizabeth Swados – Runaways
Best Original Score (Music and/or Lyrics) Written for the Theatre	Best Choreography
**On the Twentieth Century – Cy Coleman (music) and Betty Comden and Adolph Green (lyrics)**; The Act – John Kander (music) and Fred Ebb (lyrics); Runaways – Elizabeth Swados (music and lyrics); Working – Craig Carnelia, Micki Grant, Mary Rodgers, Susan Birkenhead, Stephen Schwartz and James Taylor (music and lyrics)	**Bob Fosse – Dancin'**; Arthur Faria – Ain't Misbehavin'; Ron Lewis – The Act; Elizabeth Swados – Runaways
Best Scenic Design	Best Costume Design
**Robin Wagner – On the Twentieth Century**; Zack Brown – The Importance of Being Earnest; Edward Gorey – Dracula; David Mitchell – Working	**Edward Gorey – Dracula**; Halston – The Act; Geoffrey Holder – Timbuktu!; Willa Kim – Dancin'
Best Lighting Design
**Jules Fisher – Dancin'**; Jules Fisher – Beatlemania; Tharon Musser – The Act; Ken Billington – Working

== Special awards ==
- Lawrence Langner Memorial Award for Distinguished Lifetime Achievement in the American Theatre – Irving Berlin
- Theatre Award '78 – To the creators, Charles Moss and Stan Dragoti (of Wells, Rich, Greene, Inc.) of the I Love New York Broadway Show Tours and William S. Doyle, Deputy Commissioner, the New York State Department of Commerce
- Regional Theatre Award – The Long Wharf Theatre, New Haven, Connecticut

=== Multiple nominations and awards ===
These productions had multiple nominations:

- 9 nominations: On the Twentieth Century
- 7 nominations: Dancin'
- 6 nominations: The Act and Working
- 5 nominations: Ain't Misbehavin', Dracula and Runaways
- 4 nominations: Chapter Two, Da, Deathtrap, The Gin Game and Timbuktu!
- 2 nominations: The Mighty Gents, Tartuffe and A Touch of the Poet

The following productions received multiple awards.

- 5 wins: On the Twentieth Century
- 4 wins: Da
- 3 wins: Ain't Misbehavin'
- 2 wins: Dancin' and Dracula

== See also ==
- Drama Desk Awards
- 1978 Laurence Olivier Awards – equivalent awards for West End theatre productions
- Obie Award
- New York Drama Critics' Circle
- Theatre World Award
- Lucille Lortel Awards
