= The Country Girl (1950 play) =

1950 dramatic play by Clifford Odets

- Original language: English
- Written by: Clifford Odets
- Characters: Georgie Elgin, Frank Elgin, Bernie Dodd, et al.
- Subject: Alcoholism
- Genre: Drama
- Setting: New York City

Premiere
- Date: 1950
- Place: Lyceum Theatre

The Country Girl (U.K. title "Winter Journey") is a 1950 dramatic play by American playwright Clifford Odets which was subsequently adapted as a film of the same name in 1954, starring Bing Crosby and Grace Kelly.

Uta Hagen played the title role of Georgie Elgin in its original production, with Paul Kelly as her husband Frank, and Steven Hill as theatre director Bernie Dodd. The production was directed by Odets, and ran for 30 weeks, accumulating 235 performances, from November 10, 1950, to June 2, 1951. Hagen received a Tony Award for Best Actress in a Play, and set designer Boris Aronson won for Best Scenic Design.

The play was subsequently remounted on Broadway twice, in 1972 with Maureen Stapleton and Jason Robards, and in 2008, with Frances McDormand and Morgan Freeman. It was also produced twice Off-Broadway, in 1984, with Christine Lahti and Hal Holbrook, and in 1990, with Karen Allen and David Rasche.

The play was produced for television twice, in 1974 with Georgie Elgin played by Shirley Knight, and in 1982 by Faye Dunaway.

== Awards and nominations ==
=== Original Broadway production ===
Year	Award	Category	Nominee	Result
1951	Tony Awards	Best Actress in a Play	Uta Hagen	Won
1951	Tony Awards	Best Scenic Design	Boris Aronson	Won

=== 1972 Broadway revival ===
Year	Award	Category	Nominee	Result
1972	Tony Award	Best Actor in a Play	Jason Robards	Nominated

=== 2008 Broadway revival ===
Year	Award	Category	Nominee	Result
2008	Drama Desk Award	Outstanding Revival of a Play		Nominated
2008	Drama Desk Award	Outstanding Actress in a Play	Frances McDormand	Nominated
