= 5th Tony Awards =

1951 US theatrical awards ceremony

- Date: March 25, 1951
- Location: Waldorf-Astoria Hotel; New York City, New York
- Hosted by: James Sauter
- Most wins: Guys and Dolls (5)

Television/radio coverage
- Network: WOR, Mutual Network

The 5th Annual Tony Awards were held on March 25, 1951, at the Waldorf-Astoria Grand Ballroom and broadcast on radio station WOR and the Mutual Network. The Master of Ceremonies was James Sauter and the presenters were Mrs. Martin Beck and Ilka Chase.

Performers: Barbara Ashley, Arthur Blake, Eugene Conley, Nancy Donovan, Joan Edwards, Dorothy Greener, Juanita Hall, Celeste Holm, Lois Hunt, Anne Jeffreys, Lucy Monroe, Herb Shriner.

Music was by Meyer Davis and his Orchestra.

== Award winners ==
Source:Infoplease

Nominees are not shown

=== Production ===
Award	Winner
Best Play	The Rose Tattoo by Tennessee Williams. Produced by Cheryl Crawford.
Best Musical	Guys and Dolls. Music and lyrics by Frank Loesser, book by Jo Swerling and Abe Burrows. Produced by Cy Feuer and Ernest H. Martin.

=== Performance ===
Award	Winner
Actor-Play	Claude Rains, Darkness at Noon
Actress-Play	Uta Hagen, The Country Girl
Actor-Musical	Robert Alda, Guys and Dolls
Actress-Musical	Ethel Merman, Call Me Madam
Tony Award for Actor, Supporting or Featured-Play	Eli Wallach, The Rose Tattoo
Tony Award for Actor, Supporting or Featured-Musical	Russell Nype, Call Me Madam
Tony Award for Actress, Supporting or Featured-Play	Maureen Stapleton, The Rose Tattoo
Tony Award for Actress, Supporting or Featured-Musical	Isabel Bigley, Guys and Dolls

=== Craft ===
Award	Winner
Best Director	George S. Kaufman, Guys and Dolls
Choreographer	Michael Kidd, Guys and Dolls
Costume Designer	Miles White, Bless You All
Scenic Designer	Boris Aronson, The Rose Tattoo; The Country Girl; Season In The Sun
Tony Award for Outstanding Musical Score	Irving Berlin, Call Me Madam
Tony Award for Best Conductor and Musical Director	Lehman Engel, The Consul
Tony Award for Stage Technician	Richard Raven, master electrician, The Autumn Garden

== Special Award ==
- Ruth Green, for her services as a volunteer in arranging reservation and seating for the five Tony Awards.

=== Multiple nominations and awards ===
The following productions received multiple awards.

- 5 wins: Guys and Dolls
- 4 wins: The Rose Tattoo
- 3 wins: Call Me Madam
- 2 wins: The Country Girl

== See also ==
- 23rd Academy Awards
