= 14th Tony Awards =

1960 US theatrical awards ceremony

- Date: April 24, 1960
- Location: Astor Hotel; New York City, New York
- Hosted by: Eddie Albert
- Most wins: The Sound of Music (5)
- Most nominations: Take Me Along (10)

Television/radio coverage
- Network: ABC

The 14th Annual Tony Awards took place at the Astor Hotel Grand Ballroom on April 24, 1960, and was broadcast on local television station WCBS-TV in New York City. The Master of Ceremonies was Eddie Albert.

== Eligibility ==
Shows that opened on Broadway during the 1959 season before April 1, 1960 are eligible.

Original plays

- The Andersonville Trial
- Bedtime Story
- The Best Man
- Caligula
- Chéri
- The Cool World
- Cut of the Axe
- The Deadly Game
- Dear Liar
- A Desert Incident
- A Distant Bell
- The Fighting Cock
- Five Finger Exercise
- Flowering Cherry
- The Gang's All Here
- Golden Fleecing
- The Good Soup
- Goodbye Charlie
- The Highest Tree
- Jolly's Progress
- Kataki
- The Long Dream
- Look After Lulu!
- A Loss of Roses
- A Lovely Light
- Masquerade
- A Mighty Man Is He
- The Miracle Worker
- The Moon Birds
- One More River
- Only in America
- Portrait of a Madonna
- A Pound on Demand
- A Raisin in the Sun
- Roman Candle
- Semi-Detached
- Silent Night, Lonely Night
- Some Comments on the Harmful Effects of Tobacco
- Sweet Bird of Youth
- The Tenth Man
- There Was a Little Girl
- A Thurber Carnival
- Toys in the Attic
- The Tumbler
- The Warm Peninsula

Original musicals

- At the Drop of a Hat
- Beg, Borrow or Steal
- Billy Barnes Revue
- Destry Rides Again
- Fiorello!
- First Impressions
- The Girls Against the Boys
- Greenwillow
- Gypsy
- Happy Town
- Juno
- The Littlest Circus
- The Nervous Set
- Once Upon a Mattress
- Saratoga
- The Sound of Music
- Take Me Along

Play revivals

- The Great God Brown
- Heartbreak House
- Henry IV, Part 1
- Lysistrata
- Much Ado About Nothing
- Peer Gynt
- Pictures in the Hallway

== Ceremony ==
Presenters: Jean Pierre Aumont, Lauren Bacall, Ray Bolger, Peggy Cass, Jo Van Fleet, Helen Hayes, Celeste Holm, Edward Albert Kenny, Sally Koriyo, Carol Lawrence, Vivien Leigh, Darren McGavin, Helen Menken, Robert Morse, Elliott Nugent, Lauri Peters, Christopher Plummer, Jason Robards. Music was by Meyer Davis and his Orchestra.

The ceremony was attended by 1,200 at the Astor Hotel. Michael Kidd received his fifth Tony Award for choreography, Mary Martin won her third award as actress in a musical, and two musicals tied as best musical — Fiorello! and The Sound of Music.

For the first time, several award categories (director, scenic designer) had separate awards for plays and musicals.

== Winners and nominees ==
Winners are in bold

Best Play	Best Musical
**The Miracle Worker – William Gibson**; The Best Man – Gore Vidal; A Raisin in the Sun – Lorraine Hansberry; The Tenth Man – Paddy Chayefsky; Toys in the Attic – Lillian Hellman	**Fiorello!**; **The Sound of Music**; Gypsy; Once Upon a Mattress; Take Me Along
Best Performance by a Leading Actor in a Play	Best Performance by a Leading Actress in a Play
**Melvyn Douglas – The Best Man as William Russell**; Jason Robards – Toys in the Attic as Julian Berniers; Sidney Poitier – A Raisin in the Sun as Walter Lee Younger; George C. Scott – The Andersonville Trial as Lt. Col. N. P. Chipman; Lee Tracy – The Best Man as Arthur Hockstader	**Anne Bancroft – The Miracle Worker as Annie Sullivan**; Margaret Leighton – Much Ado About Nothing as Beatrice; Claudia McNeil – A Raisin in the Sun as Lena Younger; Geraldine Page – Sweet Bird of Youth as Princess Cosmonopolis; Maureen Stapleton – Toys in the Attic as Carrie Berniers; Irene Worth – Toys in the Attic as Albertine Prine
Best Performance by a Leading Actor in a Musical	Best Performance by a Leading Actress in a Musical
**Jackie Gleason – Take Me Along as Sid Davis**; Andy Griffith – Destry Rides Again as Destry; Robert Morse – Take Me Along as Richard Miller; Anthony Perkins – Greenwillow as Gideon Briggs; Walter Pidgeon – Take Me Along as Nat Miller	**Mary Martin – The Sound of Music as Maria von Trapp**; Carol Burnett – Once Upon a Mattress as Princess Winnifred; Dolores Gray – Destry Rides Again as Frenchy; Eileen Herlie – Take Me Along as Lily Miller; Ethel Merman – Gypsy as Rose
Best Performance by a Supporting or Featured Actor in a Play	Best Performance by a Supporting or Featured Actress in a Play
**Roddy McDowall – The Fighting Cock as Tarquin Edward Mendigales**; Warren Beatty – A Loss of Roses as Kenny; Harry Guardino – One More River as Pompey; Rip Torn – Sweet Bird of Youth as Tom Junior; Lawrence Winters – The Long Dream as Tyree Tucker	**Anne Revere – Toys in the Attic as Anna Berniers**; Leora Dana – The Best Man as Alice Russell; Jane Fonda – There Was a Little Girl as Toni Newton; Sarah Marshall – Goodbye Charlie as Rusty Mayerling; Juliet Mills – Five Finger Exercise as Pamela Harrington
Best Performance by a Supporting or Featured Actor in a Musical	Best Performance by a Supporting or Featured Actress in a Musical
**Tom Bosley – Fiorello! as Fiorello La Guardia**; Theodore Bikel – The Sound of Music as Captain Georg von Trapp; Howard Da Silva – Fiorello! as Ben Marino; Kurt Kasznar – The Sound of Music as Max Detweiler; Jack Klugman – Gypsy as Herbie	**Patricia Neway – The Sound of Music as The Mother Abbess**; Sandra Church – Gypsy as Louise; Pert Kelton – Greenwillow as Gramma Briggs; Lauri Peters and Kathy Dunn, Evanna Lien, Mary Susan Locke, Marilyn Robers, William Snowden and Joseph Stewart – The Sound of Music as Liesl von Trapp and the other six von Trapp children
Best Direction of a Play	Best Direction of a Musical
**Arthur Penn – The Miracle Worker**; Joseph Anthony – The Best Man; Tyrone Guthrie – The Tenth Man; Elia Kazan – Sweet Bird of Youth; Lloyd Richards – A Raisin in the Sun	**George Abbott – Fiorello!**; Vincent J. Donehue – The Sound of Music; Peter Glenville – Take Me Along; Michael Kidd – Destry Rides Again; Jerome Robbins – Gypsy
Best Choreography	Best Conductor and Musical Director
**Michael Kidd – Destry Rides Again**; Peter Gennaro – Fiorello!; Joe Layton – Greenwillow; Lee Scot – Happy Town; Onna White – Take Me Along	**Frederick Dvonch – The Sound of Music**; Abba Bogin – Greenwillow; Lehman Engel – Take Me Along; Hal Hastings – Fiorello!; Milton Rosenstock – Gypsy
Best Scenic Design (Dramatic)	Best Scenic Design (Musical)
**Howard Bay – Toys in the Attic**; Will Steven Armstrong – Caligula; David Hays – The Tenth Man; George Jenkins – The Miracle Worker; Jo Mielziner – The Best Man	**Oliver Smith – The Sound of Music**; Cecil Beaton – Saratoga; William and Jean Eckart – Fiorello!; Peter Larkin – Greenwillow; Jo Mielziner – Gypsy
Best Costume Design	Best Stage Technician
**Cecil Beaton – Saratoga**; Alvin Colt – Greenwillow; Raoul Pene Du Bois – Gypsy; Miles White – Take Me Along	**John Walters – The Miracle Worker**; Al Alloy – Take Me Along; James Orr – Greenwillow

== Special awards ==
- John D. Rockefeller III, for vision and leadership in creating the Lincoln Center, a landmark of theatre encompassing the performing arts.
- James Thurber and Burgess Meredith (A Thurber Carnival)

=== Multiple nominations and awards ===
These productions had multiple nominations:

- 10 nominations: Take Me Along
- 9 nominations: The Sound of Music
- 8 nominations: Gypsy
- 7 nominations: Fiorello! and Greenwillow
- 6 nominations: The Best Man and Toys in the Attic
- 5 nominations: The Miracle Worker
- 4 nominations: Destry Rides Again and A Raisin in the Sun
- 3 nominations: Sweet Bird of Youth and The Tenth Man
- 2 nominations: Once Upon a Mattress and Saratoga

The following productions received multiple awards.

- 5 wins: The Sound of Music
- 4 wins: The Miracle Worker
- 3 wins: Fiorello!
- 2 wins: Toys in the Attic

== See also ==
- 32nd Academy Awards
