= The Grapes of Wrath (play) =

1988 play by Frank Galati

- Original language: English
- Written by: John Steinbeck (novel); Frank Galati (play)
- Subject: The Joad family's journey
- Genre: Drama
- Setting: 1938, Oklahoma/California

Premiere
- Date: September 1988
- Place: Steppenwolf Theatre Company; Chicago, Illinois

The Grapes of Wrath is a 1988 play adapted by Frank Galati from the classic 1939 John Steinbeck novel of the same name, with incidental music by Michael Smith. The play debuted at the Steppenwolf Theatre in Chicago, followed by a May 1989 production at the La Jolla Playhouse in San Diego and a June 1989 production at the Royal National Theatre in London. After eleven previews, the Broadway production, directed by Galati, opened on March 22, 1990 at the Cort Theatre, where it ran for 188 performances. The cast included Gary Sinise, Kathryn Erbe, Terry Kinney, Jeff Perry, Lois Smith, Sally Murphy, Francis Guinan, and Stephen Bogardus. The play was adapted for television in 1990 for the PBS series American Playhouse.

A new production opened on 25 July 2024 at the Lyttleton Theatre, part of the National Theatre. The cast included Harry Treadaway, Cherry Jones, Greg Hicks, Natey Jones and Maimuna Memon.

== Awards and nominations ==
Awards

- 1990 Tony Award for Best Play
- 2005 2nd in the Nation for High School Productions
