= 8th Tony Awards =

1954 US theatrical awards ceremony

- Date: March 28, 1954
- Location: Plaza Hotel; New York City, New York
- Hosted by: James Sauter
- Most wins: Ondine (4)

Television/radio coverage
- Network: NBC Radio Network

The 8th Annual Tony Awards, presented by the American Theatre Wing, took place at the Plaza Hotel Grand Ballroom on March 28, 1954. It was broadcast on radio by the NBC Radio Network. The Master of Ceremonies was James Sauter and the presenter was Helen Hayes. Performers were Frances Greer, Lucy Monroe, Russell Nype, Joseph Scandur, and Jean Swetland. Music was by Meyer Davis and his Orchestra.

== Award winners ==
Source:Infoplease

=== Production ===
Award	Winner
Outstanding Play	The Teahouse of the August Moon by John Patrick. Produced by Maurice Evans and George Schaefer.
Outstanding Musical	Kismet. Book by Charles Lederer and Luther Davis, music by Alexander Borodin, adapted and with lyrics by Robert Wright and George Forrest. Produced by Charles Lederer.

=== Performance ===
Award	Winner
Distinguished Dramatic Actor	David Wayne, The Teahouse of the August Moon
Distinguished Dramatic Actress	Audrey Hepburn, Ondine
Distinguished Musical Actor	Alfred Drake, Kismet
Distinguished Musical Actress	Dolores Gray, Carnival in Flanders
Distinguished Supporting or Featured Dramatic Actor	John Kerr, Tea and Sympathy
Distinguished Supporting or Featured Dramatic Actress	Jo Van Fleet, The Trip to Bountiful
Distinguished Supporting or Featured Musical Actor	Harry Belafonte, John Murray Anderson's Almanac
Distinguished Supporting or Featured Musical Actress	Gwen Verdon, Can-Can

=== Craft ===
Award	Winner
Outstanding Director	Alfred Lunt, Ondine
Outstanding Choreographer	Michael Kidd, Can-Can
Scenic Designer	Peter Larkin, Ondine and The Teahouse of the August Moon
Costume Designer	Richard Whorf, Ondine
Best Conductor	Louis Adrian, Kismet
Best Stage Technician	John Davis, Picnic, for constant good work as a theatre electrician.

=== Multiple nominations and awards ===
The following productions received multiple awards.

- 4 wins: Ondine
- 3 wins: Kismet and The Teahouse of the August Moon
- 2 wins: Can-Can

== See also ==
- 26th Academy Awards
