= A Small Family Business =

Play by Alan Ayckbourn

A Smal Family Business
- Written by: Alan Ayckbourn
- Characters: Ken; Desmond; Harriet; Jack; Poppy; Cliff; Anita; Samantha; Tina; Roy; Yvonne; Benedict; The Rivetti Brothers
- Original language: English
- Subject: Greed, corruption
- Genre: Drama

Premiere
- Date premiered: 21 May 1987
- Place premiered: England
- Official website

A Small Family Business is a play by Alan Ayckbourn about the eponymous business and dealing with the Thatcherism of the time. It premiered at the Olivier stage of the Royal National Theatre on 20 May 1987, where it won the Evening Standard Award for Best Play for that year. Its Broadway premiere occurred on 27 April 1992.

== Radio adaptation ==
A radio adaptation directed by Martin Jarvis was broadcast at 8 p.m. on Sunday 12 April 2009 on BBC Radio 3 as part of the celebrations of its author's 70th birthday that day. Its cast included:

- Jack McCraken – Alfred Molina
- Benedict – Adam Godley
- Poppy – Rosalind Ayres
- Anita – Joanne Whalley
- Cliff – Kenneth Danziger
- Ken – Roy Dotrice
- Yvonne – Millicent Martin
- Harriet – Jill Gascoine
- Desmond – Julian Sands
- Roy – Darren Richardson
- Tina – Moira Quirk
- Samantha – Fuchsia Sumner
- The five Rivetti brothers – Matthew Wolf

== Reception ==
In 2000, The Telegraph's Charles Spencer praised A Small Family Business as one of the "finest British plays of recent years" along with Tom Stoppard's Arcadia (1993).
