= Take Me Along =

1959 musical

Take Me Along!
- 1959 Broadway Playbill
- Music: Bob Merrill
- Lyrics: Bob Merrill
- Book: Joseph Stein; Robert Russell
- Basis: Ah, Wilderness! by Eugene O'Neill
- Productions: 1959 Broadway; 1985 Broadway revival

Take Me Along is a 1959 musical based on the 1933 Eugene O'Neill play Ah, Wilderness!, with music and lyrics by Bob Merrill and book by Joseph Stein and Robert Russell.

== Background ==
The idea to musicalize Ah, Wilderness! came to David Merrick when George M. Cohan came through St. Louis with the original production of the O'Neill play. (It was rare of Merrick to mention his hometown, as he hated it, and once he refused to fly TWA to the coast because it flew over St. Louis). While producing The Matchmaker in 1955, he began working on Connecticut Summer. Things came to a halt when lyricist/librettist John La Touche died suddenly in 1956 at the age of 41. But in 1957, an adaptation of another O'Neill play, Anna Christie, came to town, called New Girl in Town. Merrick decided to ask the composer, Bob Merrill, to take another stab at it.

== Synopsis ==
In a small Connecticut town on July 4, 1906, Nat and Essie Miller head a middle class New England family with teenage children who are coming of age, falling in love, and desperately trying to stay out of trouble. Bob Merrill's score includes "Staying Young," "That's How It Starts," "Promise Me A Rose," and the title song.

== Original cast and characters ==
Character	Broadway (1959)	First Broadway Revival (1985)
Sid Davis	Jackie Gleason	Kurt Knudson
Nat Miller	Walter Pidgeon	Robert Nichols
Lily Miller	Eileen Herlie	Beth Fowler
Essie Miller	Una Merkel	Betty Johnson
Richard Miller	Robert Morse	Gary Landon Wright
Wint Selby	Peter Conlow	Joel Whittaker
Muriel McComber	Susan Luckey	Taryn Grimes
Dave MacComber	Fred Miller	Richard Korthaze
Belle	Arlene Golonka	Nikki Sahagen
Mildred Miller	Zeme North	Alyson Kirk
Arthur Miller	James Cresson	Stephen McDonough
Tommy Miller	Luke Halpin	N/A
Bartender	Jack Collins	David Vosburgh
The Drunk	Gene Varrone	N/A

== Songs ==
Act I

- The Parade - Nat Miller and Townspeople
- Oh, Please - Nat Miller, Essie Miller, Lily Miller and Family
- I Would Die - Muriel Macomber and Richard Miller
- Sid, Ol' Kid - Sid Davis and Townspeople
- Staying Young - Nat Miller
- I Get Embarrassed - Sid Davis and Lily Miller
- We're Home - Lily Miller
- Take Me Along - Sid Davis and Nat Miller
- For Sweet Charity - Sid Davis, Nat Miller, Lady Entertainers and Townspeople
- Volunteer Firemen's Picnic - Sid Davis
- Pleasant Beach House - Wint
- That's How It Starts - Richard Miller

Act II

- The Beardsley Ballet - Richard Miller, Muriel Macomber, The Beardsley Dwarf, Salome and Ensemble (In the 1985 revival, "If Jesus Don't Love Ya (Jack Daniels Will)" replaced the Ballet.)
- Oh, Please (Reprise) - Nat Miller and Essie Miller
- Promise Me a Rose - Lily Miller and Sid Davis
- Staying Young (Reprise) - Nat Miller
- Little Green Snake - Sid Davis
- Nine O'Clock - Richard Miller
- But Yours - Sid Davis and Lily Miller
- Take Me Along (Reprise) - Lily Miller, Sid Davis and Townspeople

Knights on White Horses was added for Lily (Beth Fowler) in the 1985 revival. Volunteer Firemen's Picnic has been borrowed twice by animated TV show Family Guy: first for the episode PTV as The Freakin' FCC. The song then returned for a special appearance at the Emmy Awards as If You Want It You Can Find It On TV, taking potshots at Desperate Housewives, Two and a Half Men and The Sopranos among others.

== Productions ==
Take Me Along was directed by Peter Glenville with choreography by Onna White, production design by Oliver Smith, lighting by Jean Rosenthal, costumes by Miles White, musical direction and vocal arrangements by Lehman Engel, dances and musical numbers staging by Onna White, ballet and incidental music by Laurence Rosenthal, orchestrations by Philip J. Lang; and was produced by David Merrick. It opened on Broadway at the Shubert Theatre on October 22, 1959 and closed on December 17, 1960, after 448 performances.

A revival opened on Broadway at the Martin Beck Theater in April 1985, closing after 7 previews and 1 regular performance following seven months of successful runs at The Goodspeed Opera House, The Shubert Theatre New Haven, and The Kennedy Center. Kurt Knudson scored a Tony nomination for the role of Sid Davis and Gary Wright received a Theatre World Award nomination for his role as Richard Miller.

The musical opened at the Irish Repertory Theater, New York City, in a limited run, from February 28, 2008, through April 13, 2008.

== Use in advertising ==
In 1967, United Airlines' advertising agency, Leo Burnett, adapted the title song for a massive ad campaign, anchored by promotional films directed by Michael Cimino, who would later become a noted motion picture screenwriter and director. An urban legend then goes on to say that the ad campaign backfired when United offered a two-for-one "take me along" fare in ads encouraging (male) business travelers to take their wives with them on business trips. United then sent "thank you" letters to the wives of business travelers who had taken advantage of the promotion. Unfortunately, many of these wives had not been "taken along" on those trips. Instead, many husbands had supposedly traveled with their mistresses. In truth, companions were only offered discounts, never freebies.

== Awards and nominations ==
=== Original Broadway production ===
Year	Award Ceremony	Category	Nominee	Result
1960	Tony Award	Best Musical		Nominated
1960	Tony Award	Best Performance by a Leading Actor in a Musical	Jackie Gleason	Won
1960	Tony Award	Best Performance by a Leading Actor in a Musical	Robert Morse	Nominated
1960	Tony Award	Best Performance by a Leading Actor in a Musical	Walter Pidgeon	Nominated
1960	Tony Award	Best Performance by a Leading Actress in a Musical	Eileen Herlie	Nominated
1960	Tony Award	Best Direction of a Musical	Peter Glenville	Nominated
1960	Tony Award	Best Choreography	Onna White	Nominated
1960	Tony Award	Best Conductor and Musical Director	Lehman Engel	Nominated
1960	Tony Award	Best Costume Design	Miles White	Nominated
1960	Tony Award	Best Stage Technician	Al Alloy	Nominated
