= 7th Tony Awards =

1953 US theatrical awards ceremony

- Date: March 29, 1953
- Location: Waldorf-Astoria Hotel; New York City, New York
- Hosted by: Faye Emerson
- Most wins: Wonderful Town (5)

Television/radio coverage
- Network: National Broadcasting Company radio

The 7th Annual Tony Awards, presented by the American Theatre Wing, took place at the Waldorf-Astoria Starlight Ballroom on March 29, 1953. The Antoinette Perry Awards for Excellence in Theatre, more commonly known as the Tony Awards, recognize achievement in Broadway theatre. The event was broadcast on radio by the National Broadcasting Company. The presenter was Faye Emerson. Music was by Meyer Davis and his Orchestra.

== Award winners ==
Source:Infoplease

=== Production ===
Award	Winner
Outstanding Play	The Crucible by Arthur Miller. Produced by Kermit Bloomgarden.
Outstanding Musical	Wonderful Town. Book by Joseph Fields and Jerome Chodorov, music by Leonard Bernstein, lyrics by Betty Comden and Adolph Green. Produced by Robert Fryer.

=== Performance ===
Award	Winner
Distinguished Dramatic Actor	Tom Ewell, The Seven Year Itch
Distinguished Dramatic Actress	Shirley Booth, The Time of the Cuckoo
Distinguished Musical Actor	Thomas Mitchell, Hazel Flagg
Distinguished Musical Actress	Rosalind Russell, Wonderful Town
Distinguished Supporting or Featured Dramatic Actor	John Williams, Dial M for Murder
Distinguished Supporting or Featured Dramatic Actress	Beatrice Straight, The Crucible
Distinguished Supporting or Featured Musical Actor	Hiram Sherman, Two's Company
Distinguished Supporting or Featured Musical Actress	Sheila Bond, Wish You Were Here

=== Craft ===
Award	Winner
Director	Joshua Logan, Picnic
Scenic Designer	Raoul Pene Du Bois, Wonderful Town
Costume Designer	Miles White, Hazel Flagg
Choreographer	Donald Saddler, Wonderful Town
Conductor and Musical Director	Lehman Engel, Wonderful Town and Gilbert and Sullivan Season
Tony Award for Best Stage Technician	Abe Kurnit, Wish You Were Here

== Special awards ==
- Beatrice Lillie, for An Evening with Beatrice Lillie.
- Danny Kaye, for heading a variety bill at the Palace Theatre.
- Equity Community Theatre.

=== Multiple nominations and awards ===
The following productions received multiple awards.

- 5 wins: Wonderful Town
- 2 wins: The Crucible, Hazel Flagg and Wish You Were Here

== See also ==
- 25th Academy Awards
