= Tony Award for Best Actor in a Musical =

American theatre award for Broadway actors

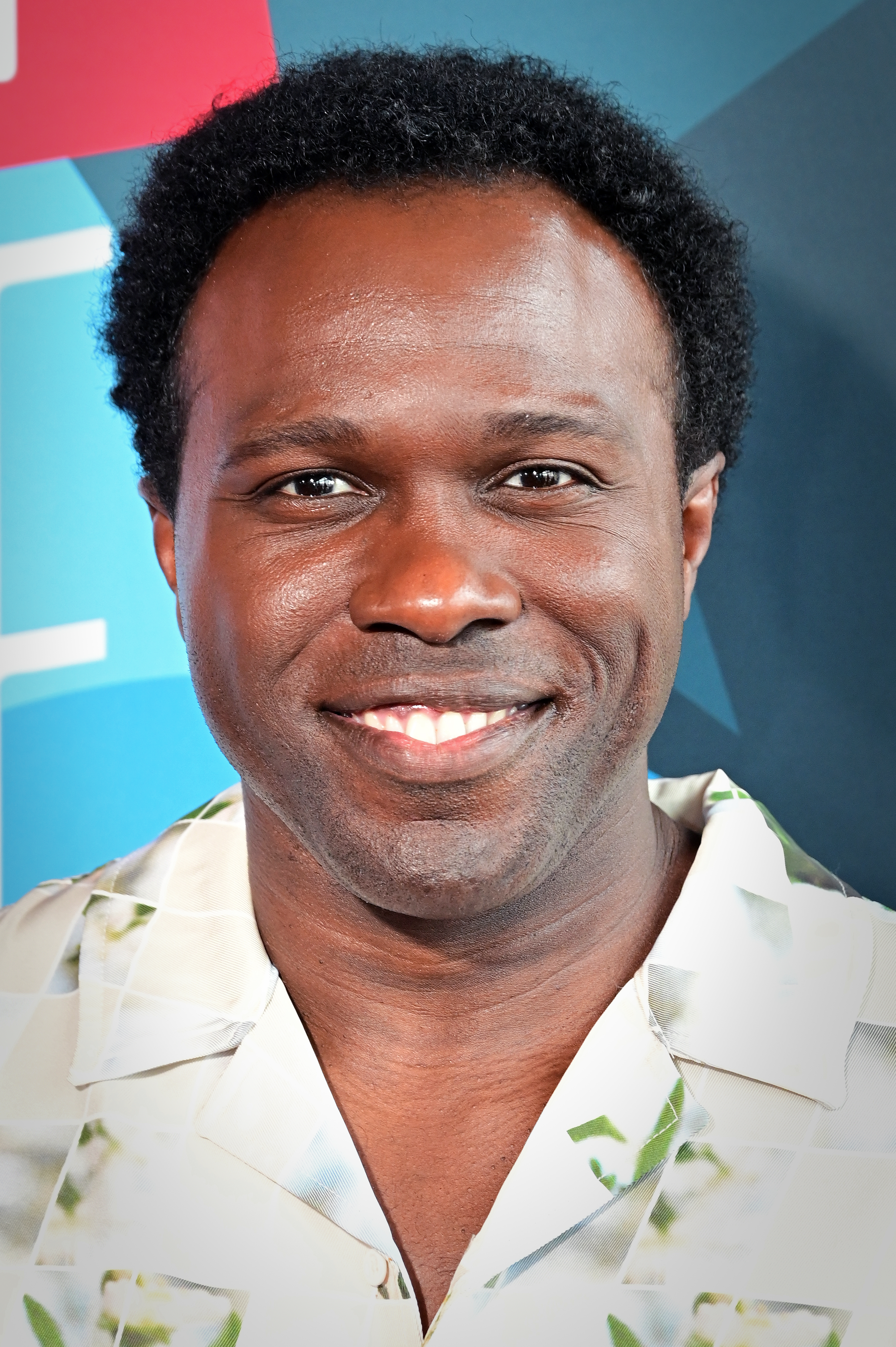
- 2026 Recipient: Joshua Henry
- Awarded for: Best Performance by a Leading Actor in a Musical
- Location: New York City
- Presented by: American Theatre Wing The Broadway League
- Currently held by: Joshua Henry for Ragtime (2026)
- Website: TonyAwards.com

The Tony Award for Best Performance by a Leading Actor in a Musical is an honor presented at the Tony Awards, a ceremony established in 1947 as the Antoinette Perry Awards for Excellence in Theatre, to actors for quality leading roles in a musical play, whether a new production or a revival. The awards are named after Antoinette Perry, an American actress who died in 1946.

Honors in several categories are presented at the ceremony annually by the Tony Award Productions, a joint venture of The Broadway League and the American Theatre Wing, to "honor the best performances and stage productions of the previous year."

The award was originally called the Tony Award for Actors—Musical. It was first presented to Paul Hartman at the 2nd Tony Awards for his portrayal of various characters in Angel in the Wings. Before 1956, nominees' names were not made public; the change was made by the awards committee to "have a greater impact on theatregoers".

Nine actors hold the record for having the most wins in this category, with a total of two. John Cullum, Brian d'Arcy James and Raul Julia are tied with the most nominations, with a total of four. Pseudolus in A Funny Thing Happened on the Way to the Forum is the character to take the award the most times, winning three times. Tevye in Fiddler on the Roof is the most nominated character in this category, with five nominations.

== Winners and nominees ==
indicates the winner

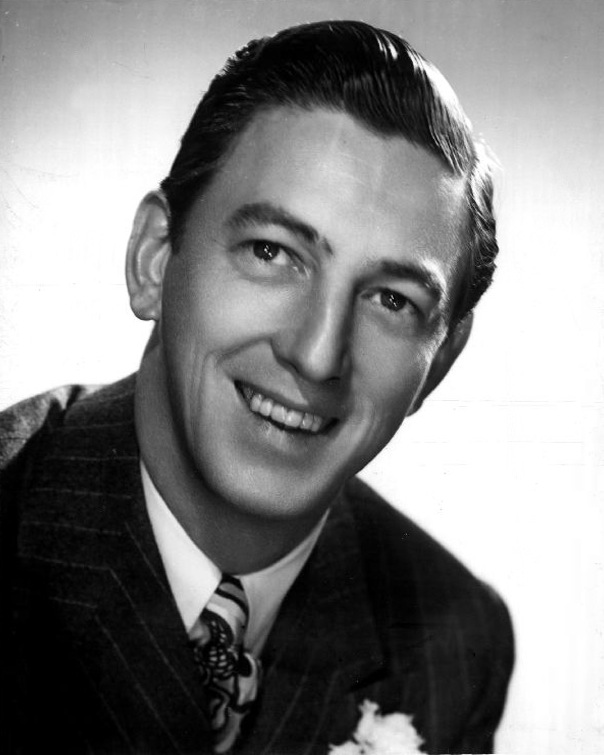
Ray Bolger won for Where's Charley? (1949)

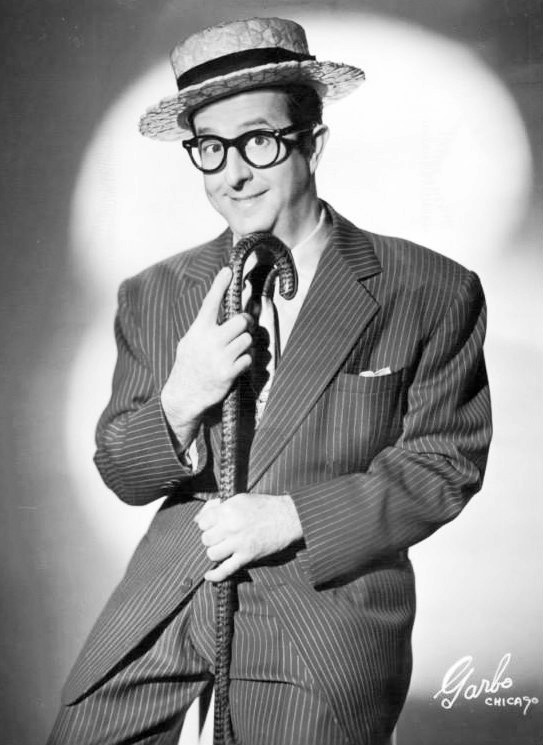
Phil Silvers won twice for Top Banana (1952) and A Funny Thing Happened on the Way to the Forum (1972)

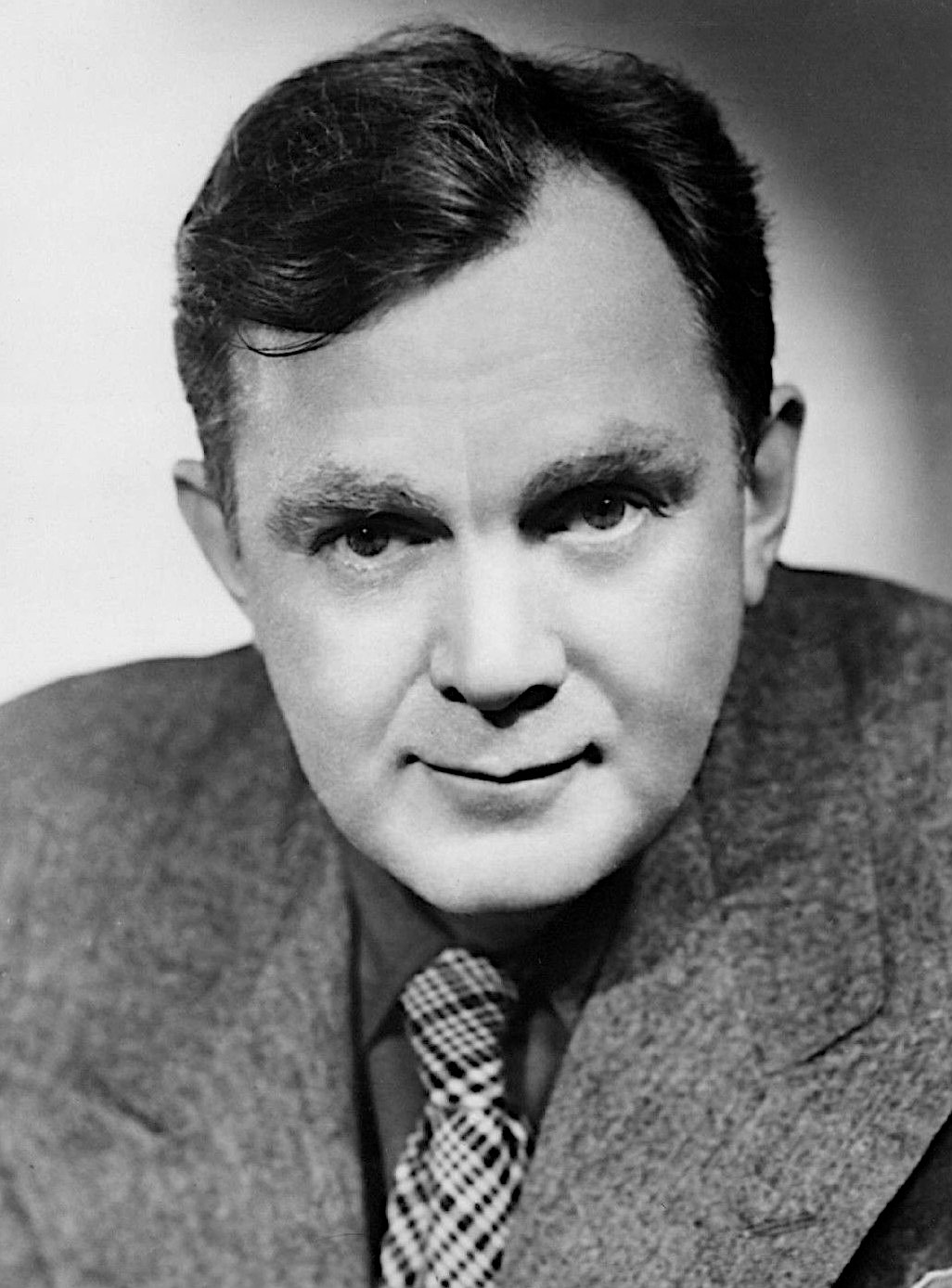
Thomas Mitchell won for Hazel Flagg (1953)

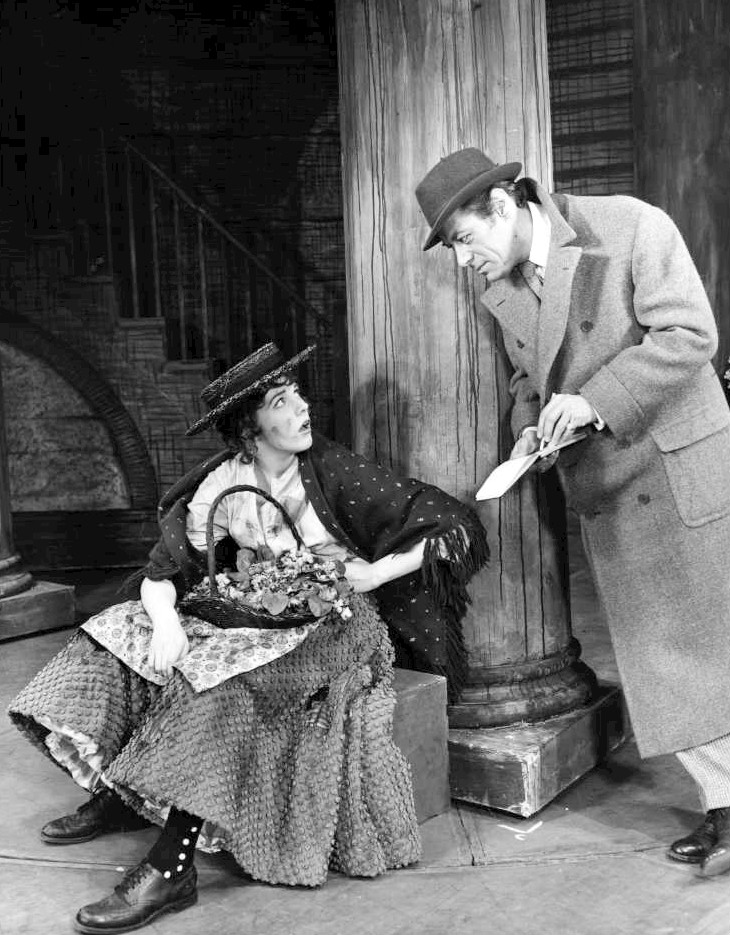
Rex Harrison for My Fair Lady (1957)

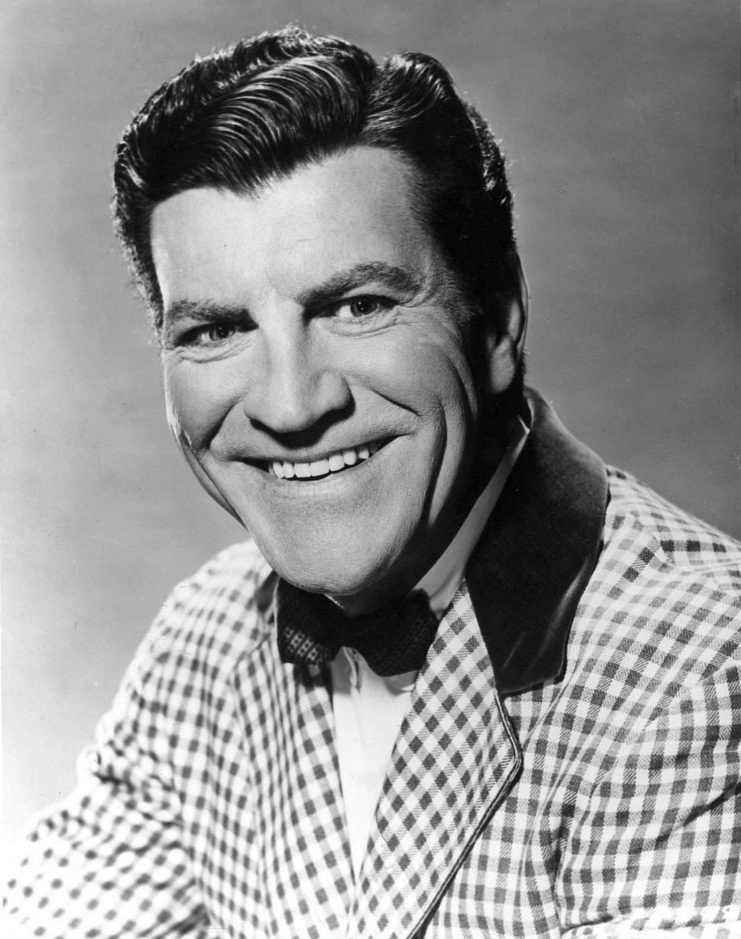
Robert Preston won twice for The Music Man (1958) and I Do! I Do! (1967)

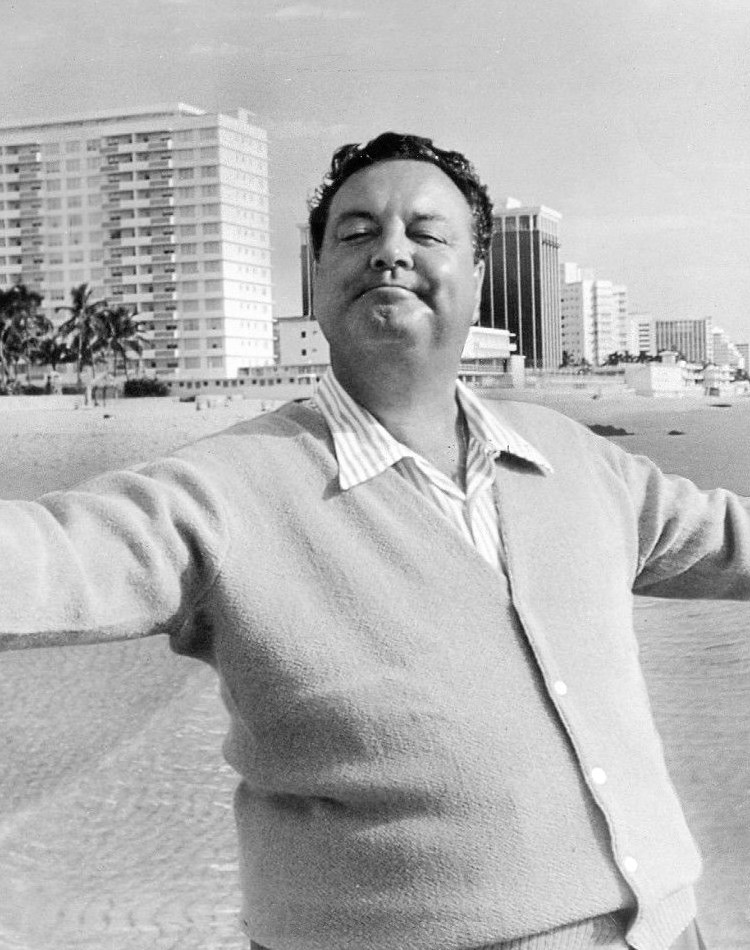
Jackie Gleason won for Take Me Along (1960)

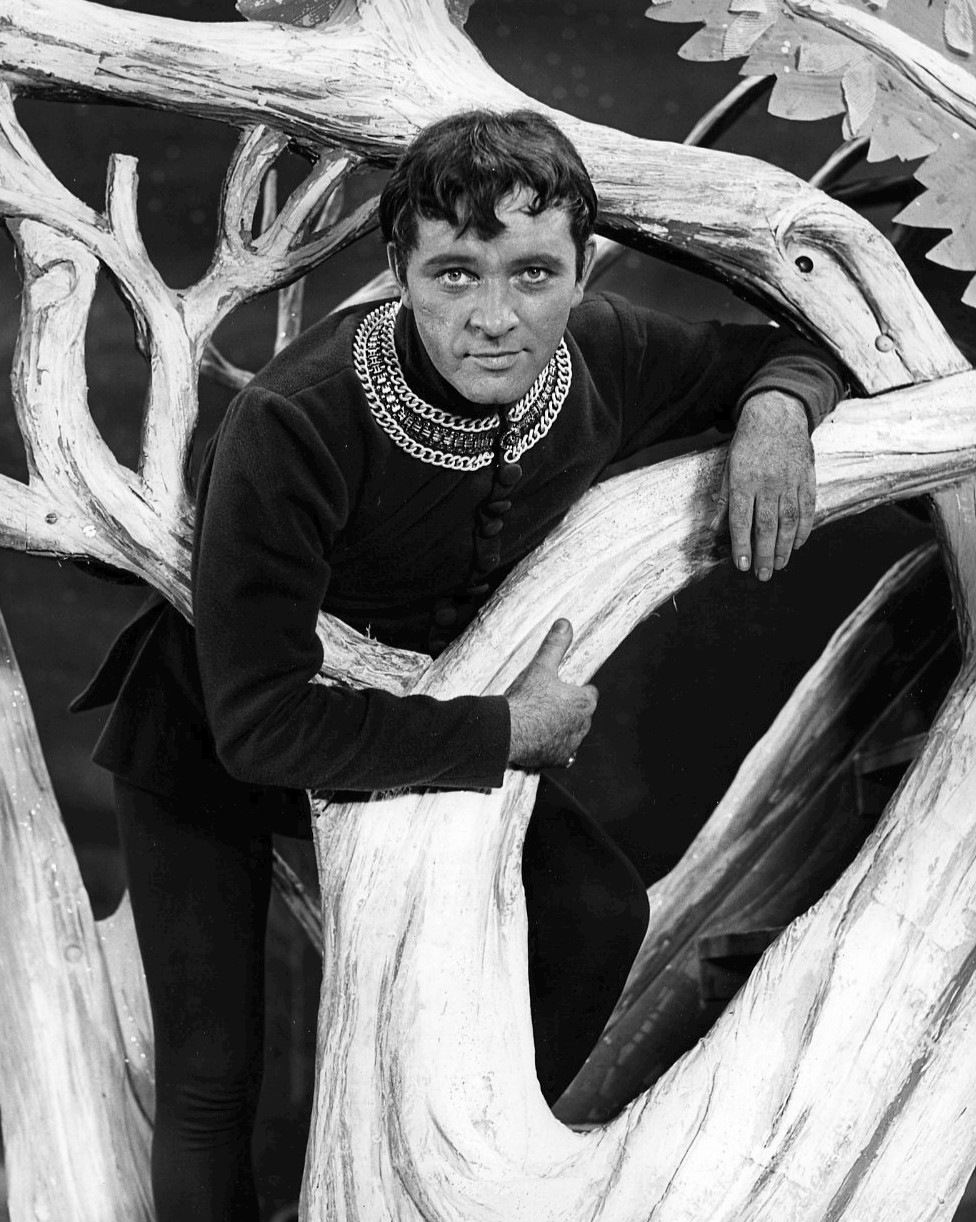
Richard Burton won for Camelot (1961)

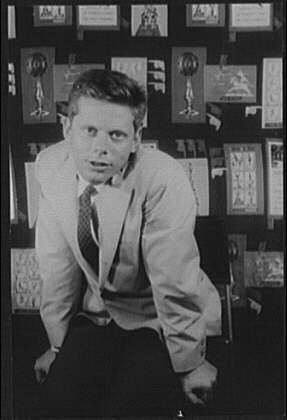
Robert Morse won for How to Succeed in Business Without Really Trying (1962)

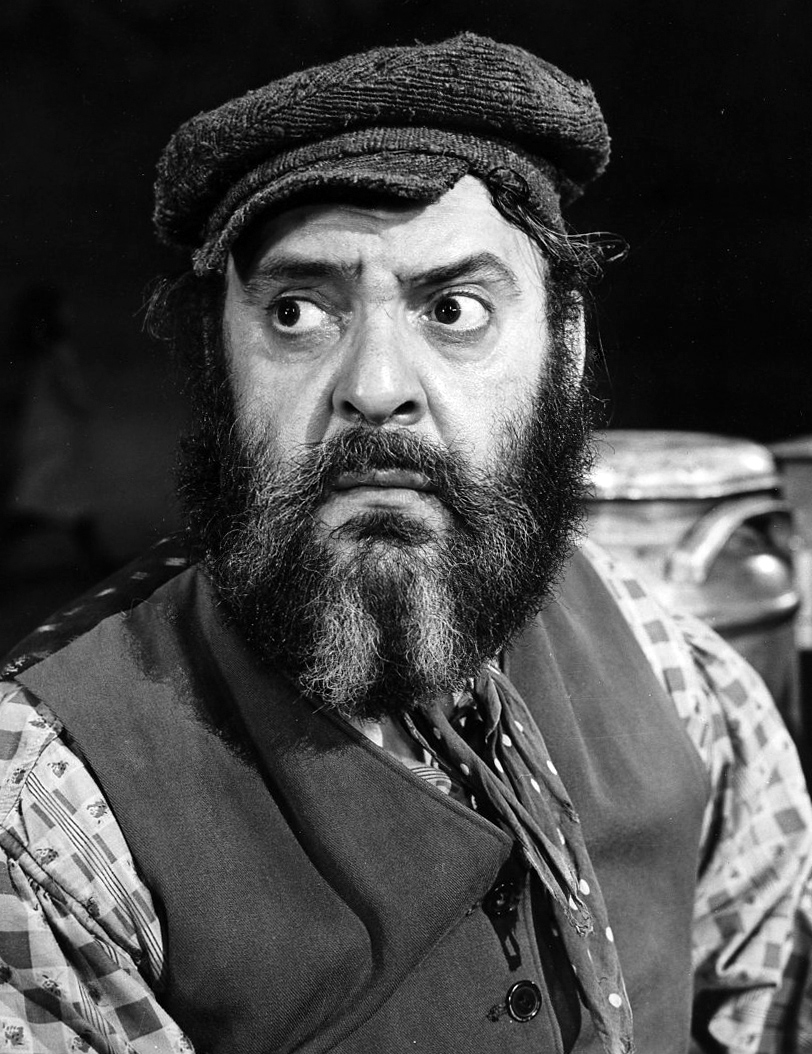
Zero Mostel won twice for A Funny Thing Happened on the Way to the Forum (1963) and Fiddler on the Roof (1965)

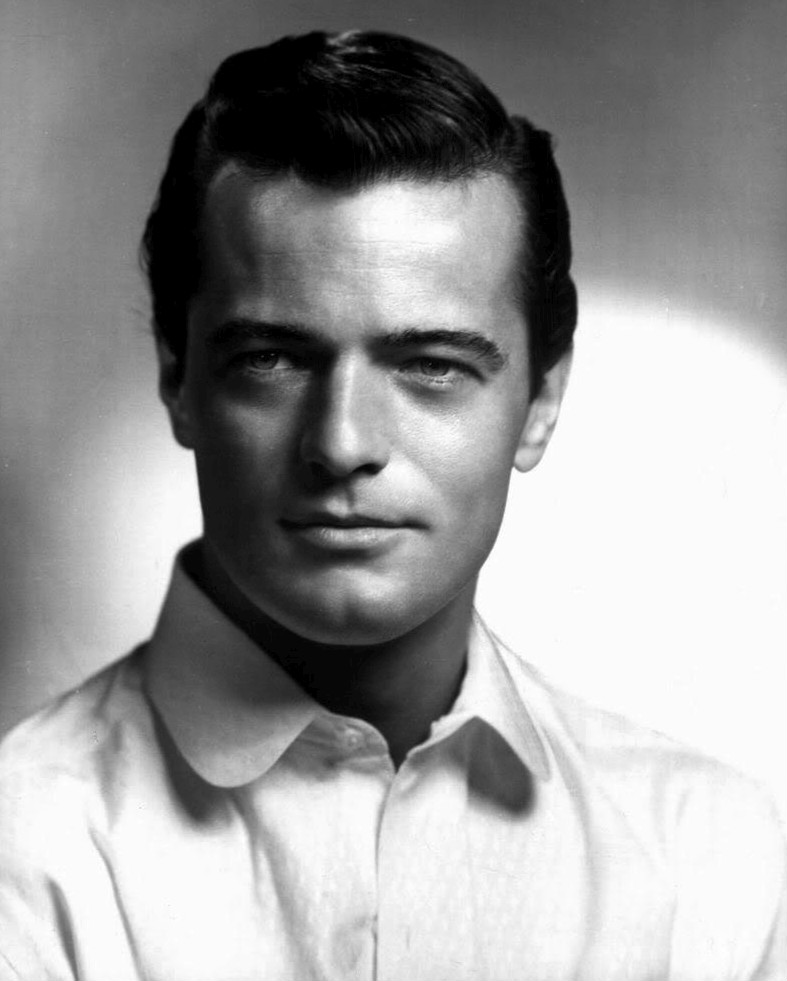
Robert Goulet won for The Happy Time (1968)

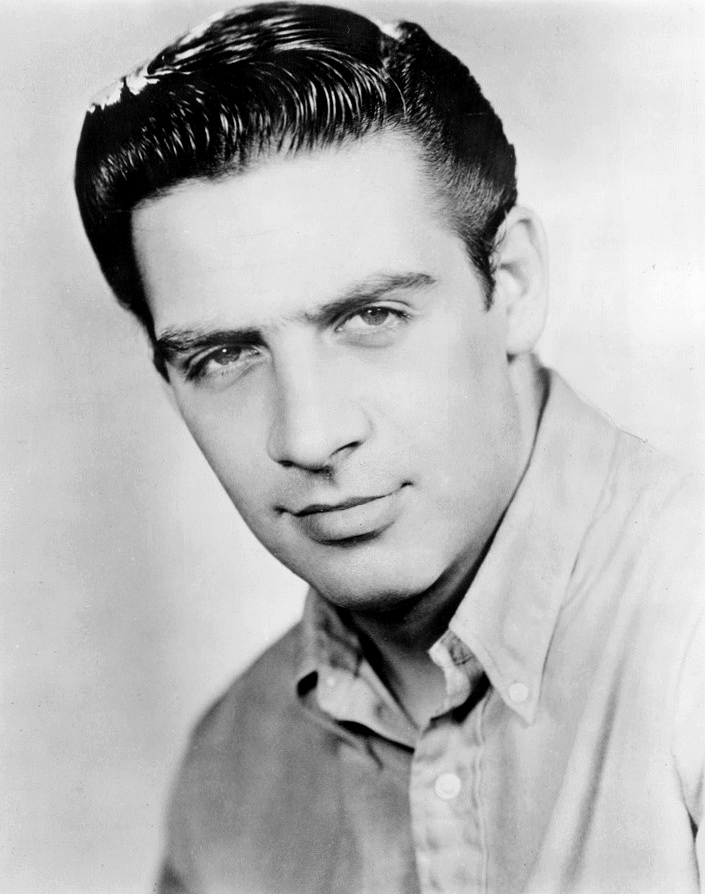
Jerry Orbach won for Promises, Promises (1969)

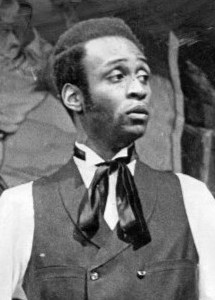
Cleavon Little won for Purlie (1970)

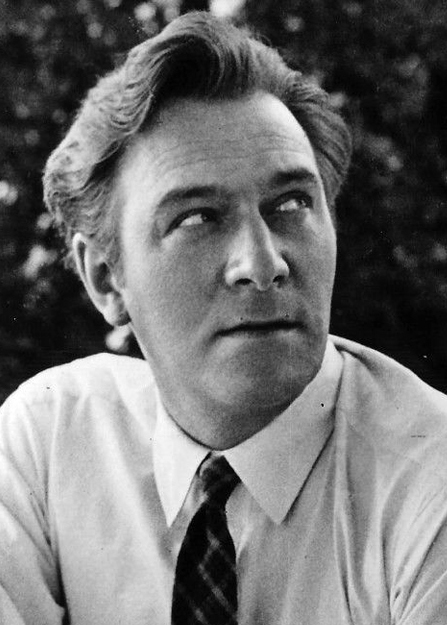
Christopher Plummer won for Cyrano (1974)

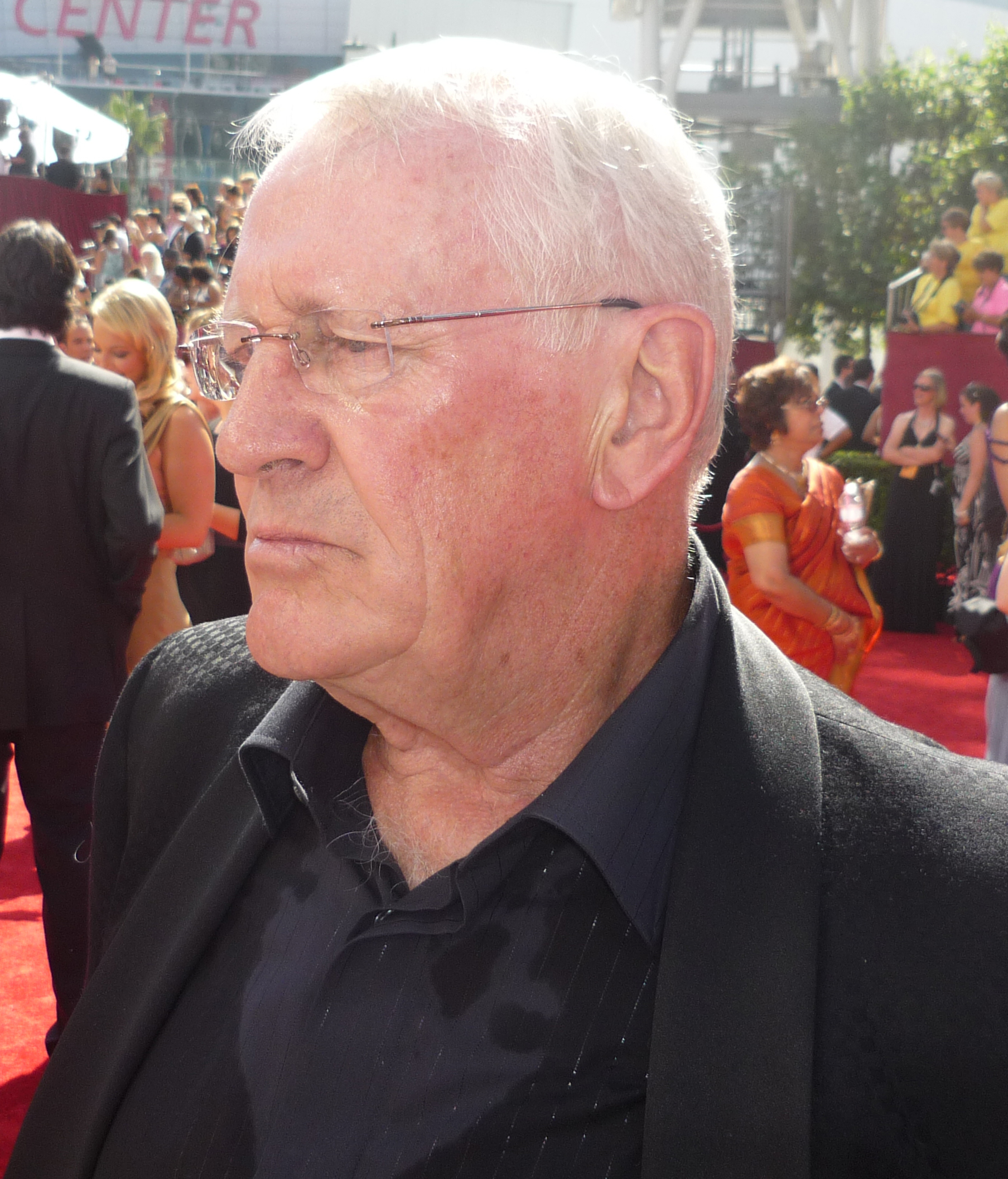
Len Cariou won for Sweeney Todd: The Demon Barber of Fleet Street (1979)

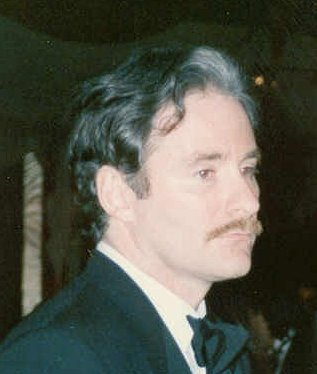
Kevin Kline won for The Pirates of Penzance (1981)

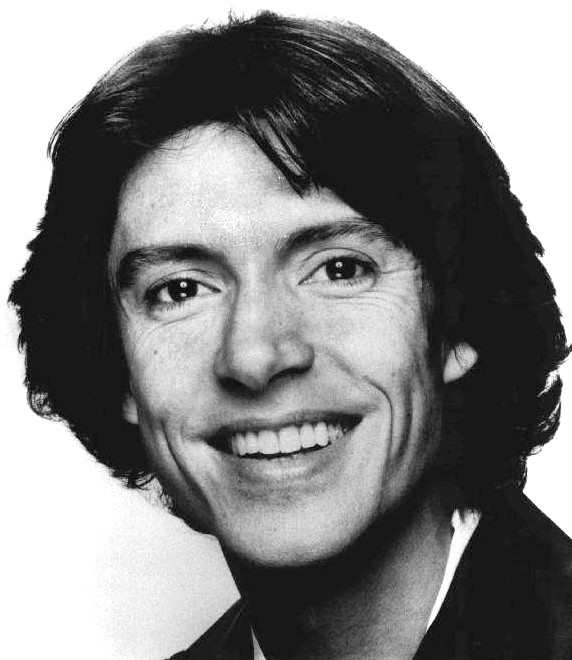
Tommy Tune won for My One and Only (1983)

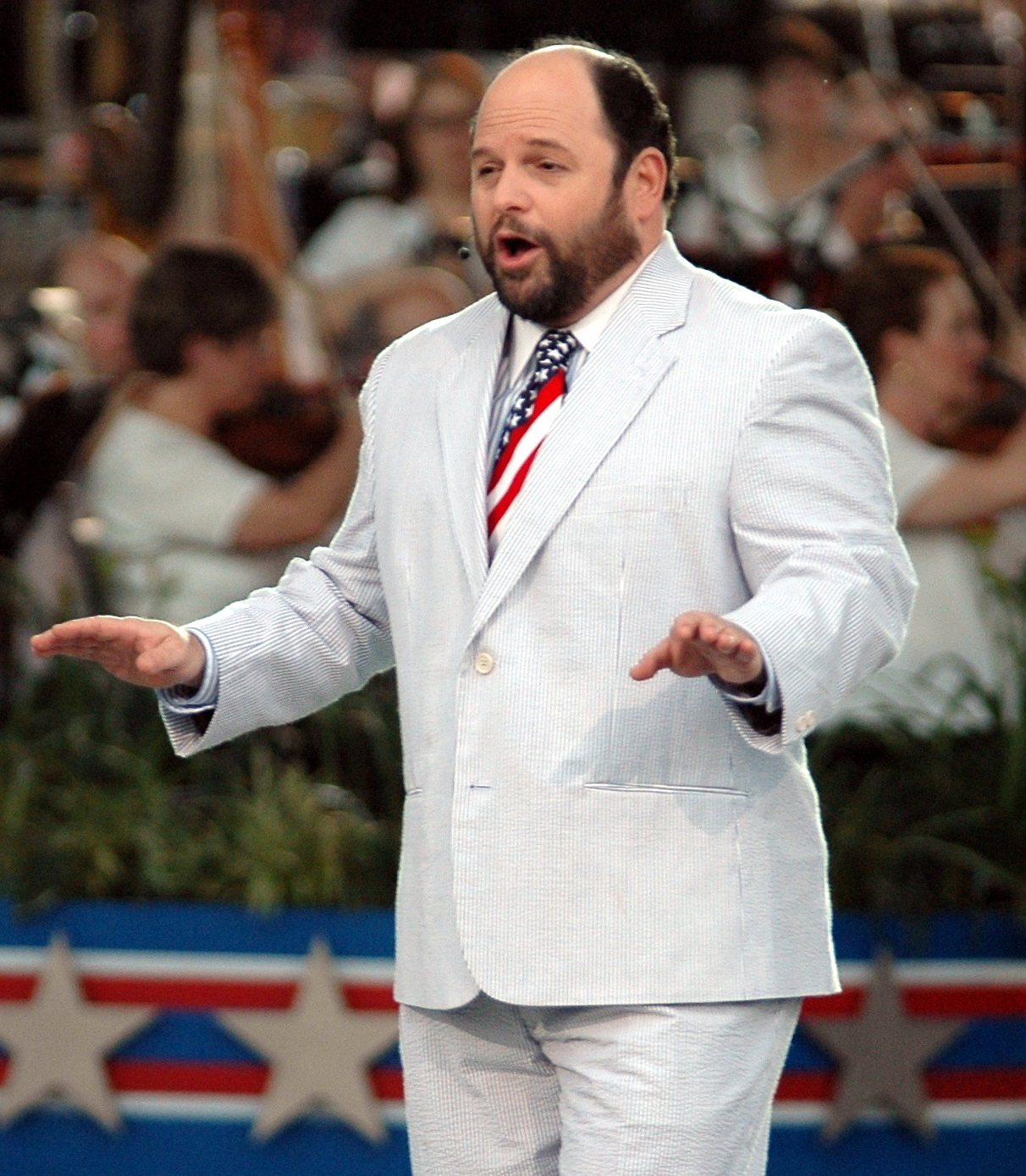
Jason Alexander won for Jerome Robbins' Broadway (1989)

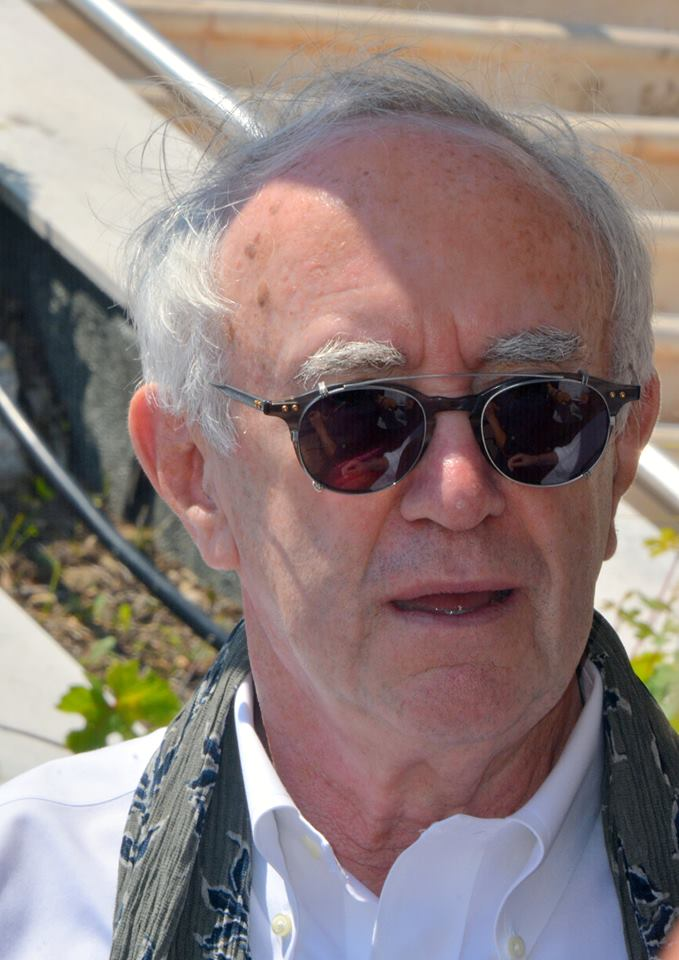
Jonathan Pryce won for Miss Saigon (1991)

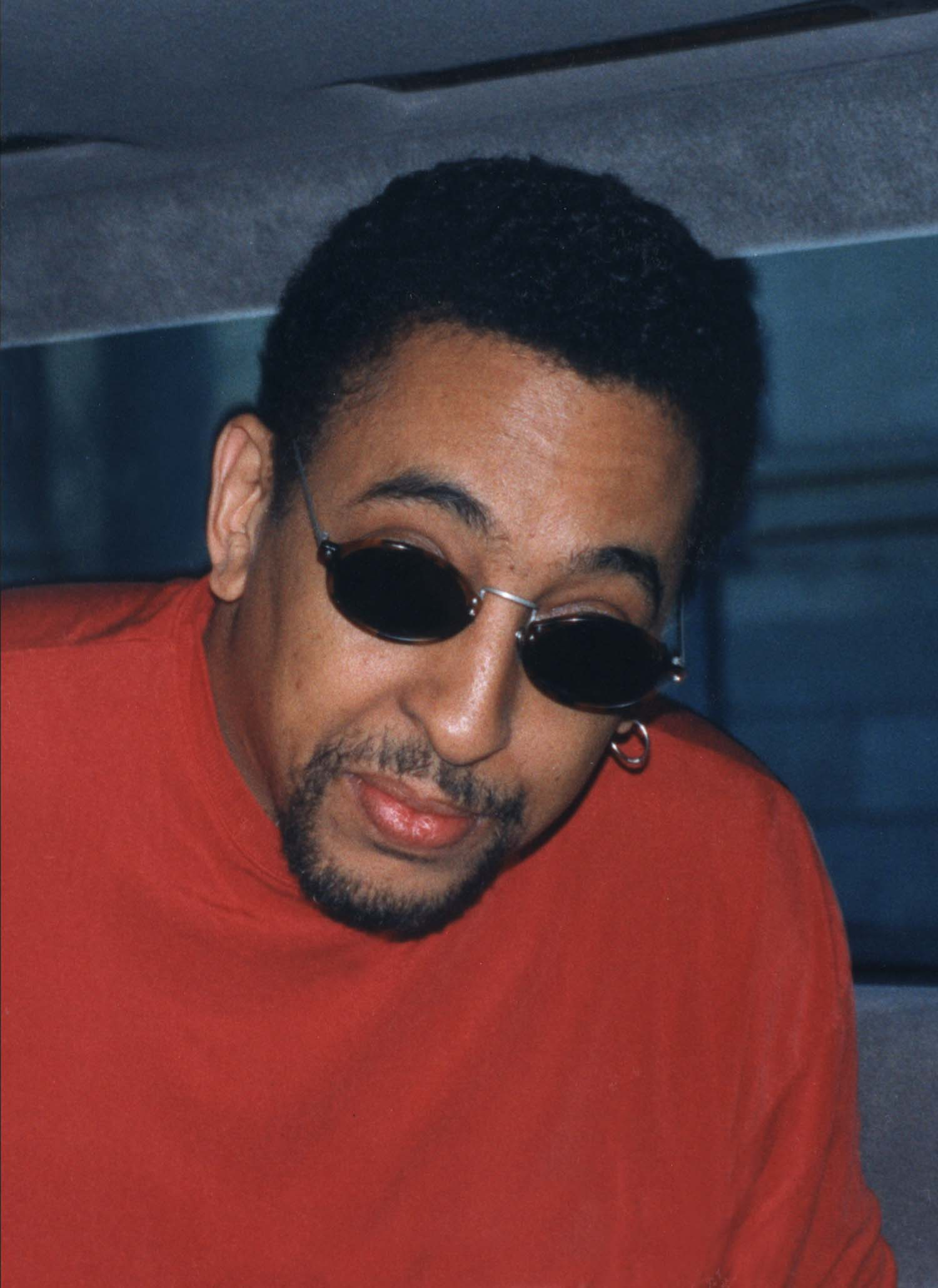
Gregory Hines won for Jelly's Last Jam (1992)

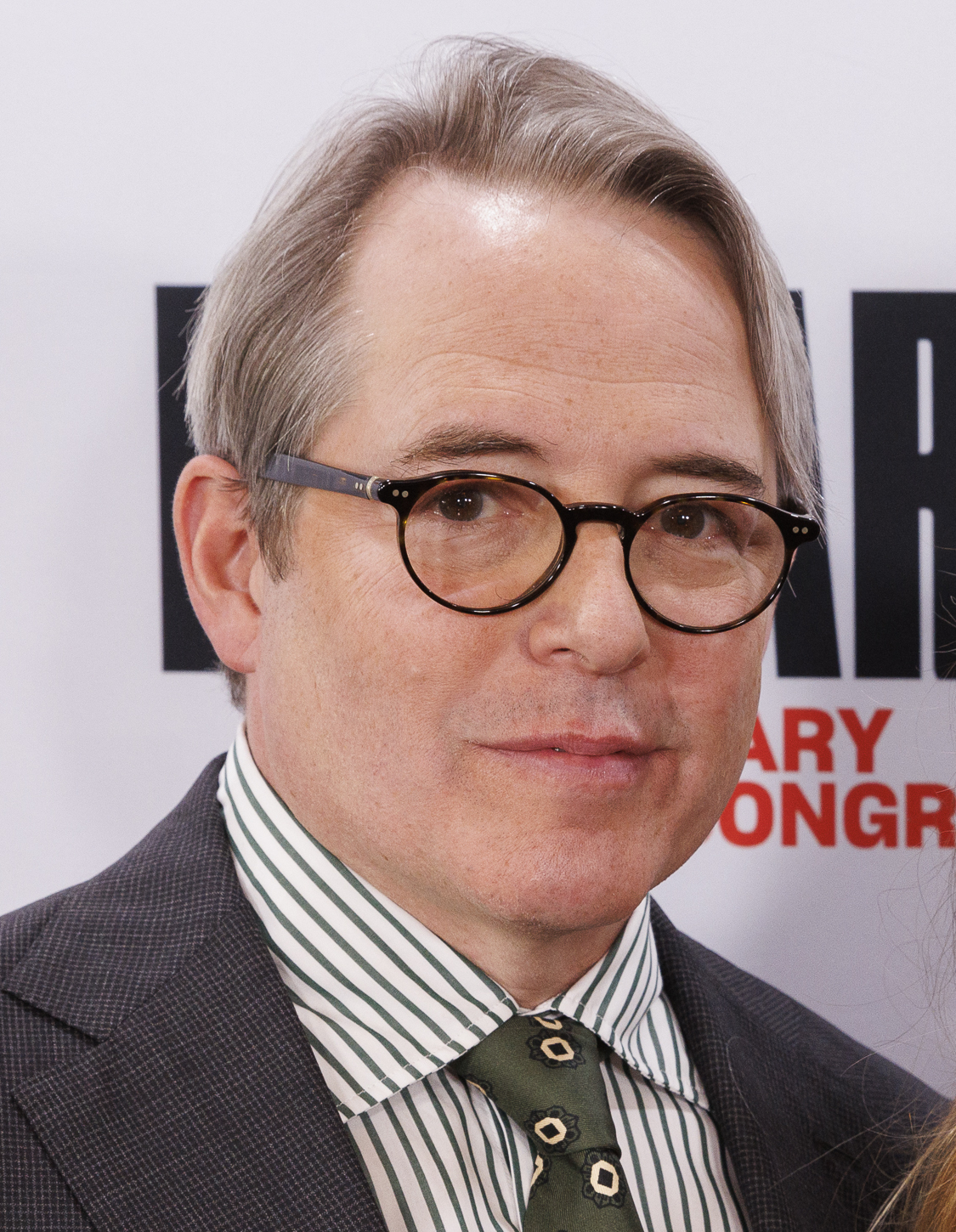
Matthew Broderick won for How to Succeed in Business Without Really Trying (1996)

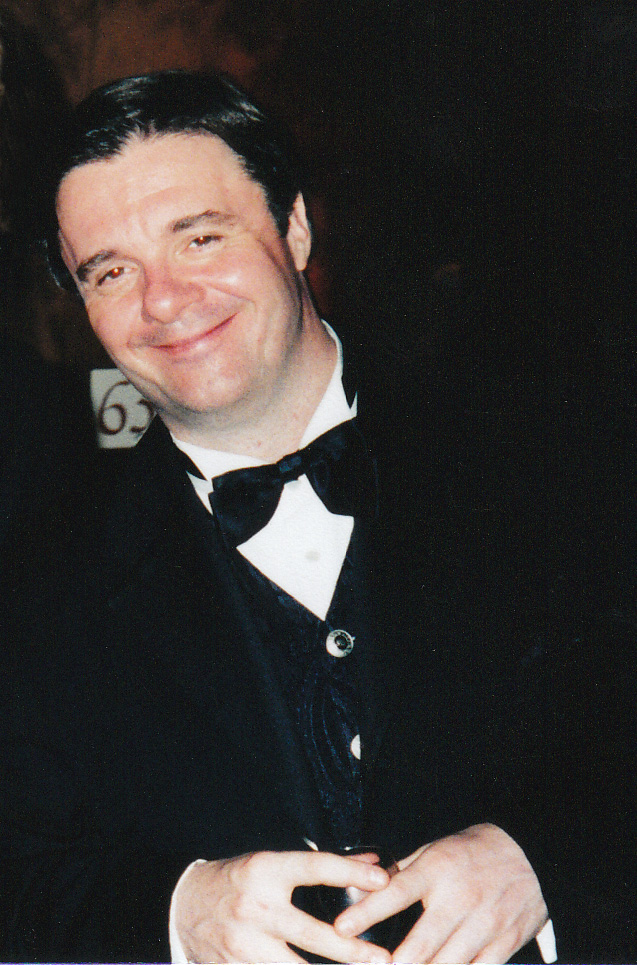
Nathan Lane won twice for A Funny Thing Happened on the Way to the Forum (1996) and The Producers (2001)

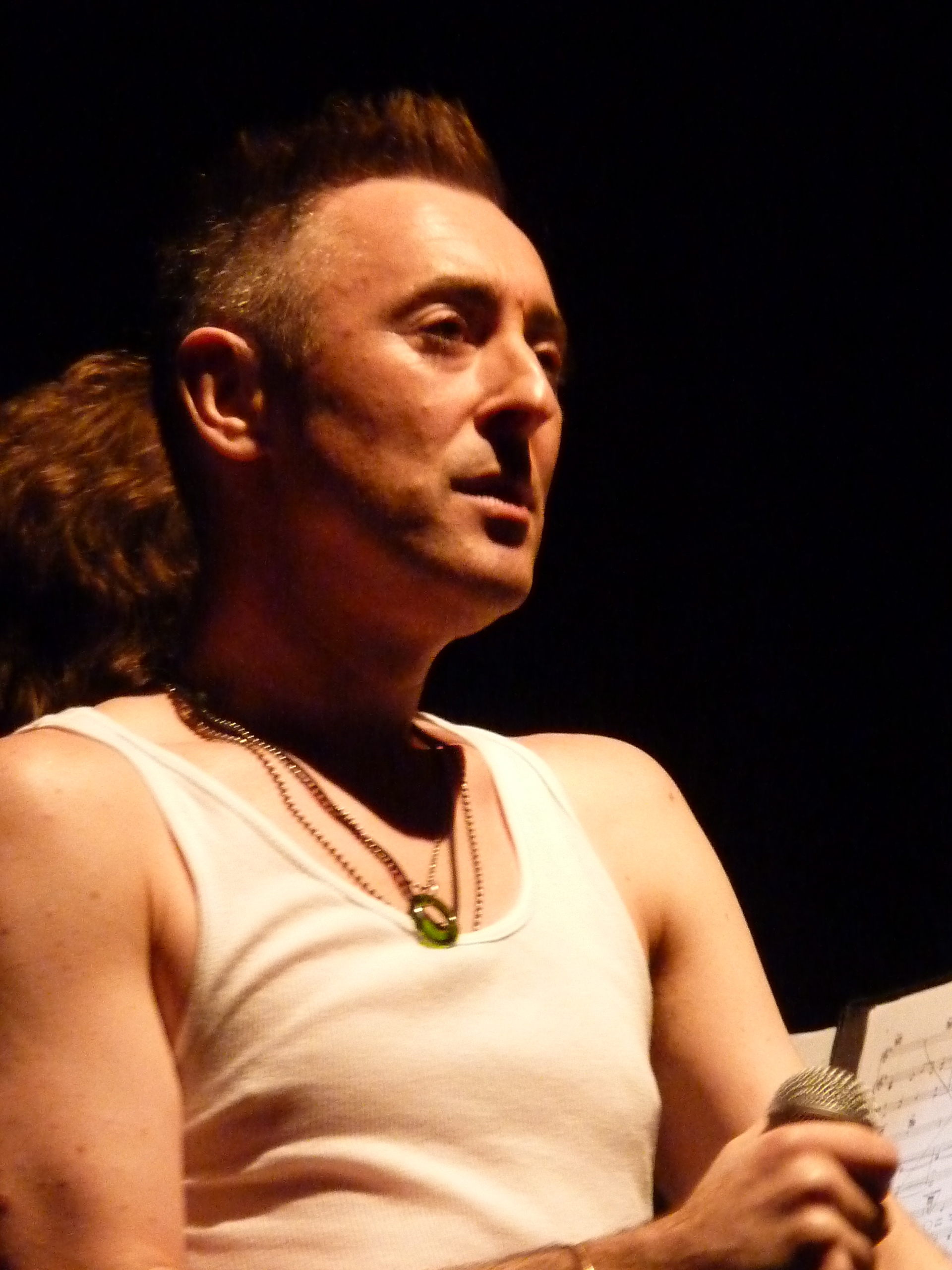
Alan Cumming won for Cabaret (1998)

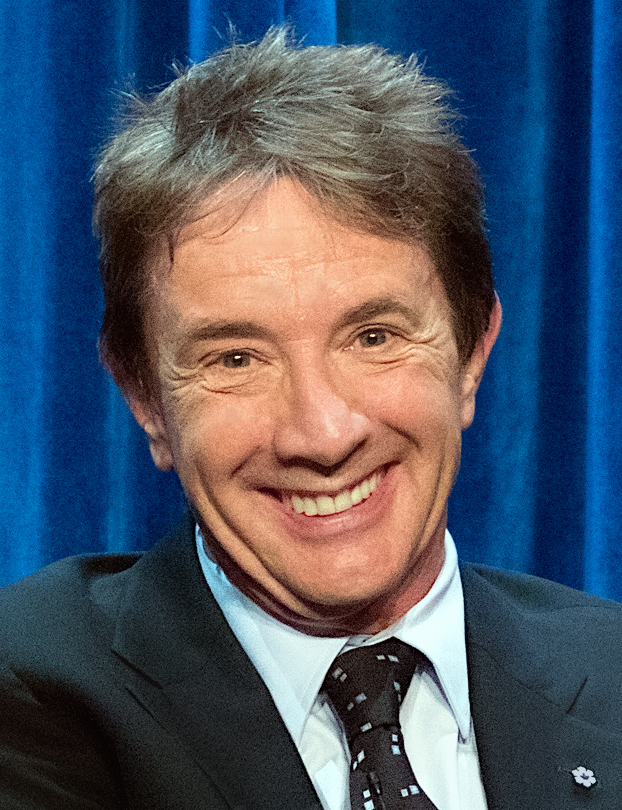
Martin Short won for Little Me (1999)

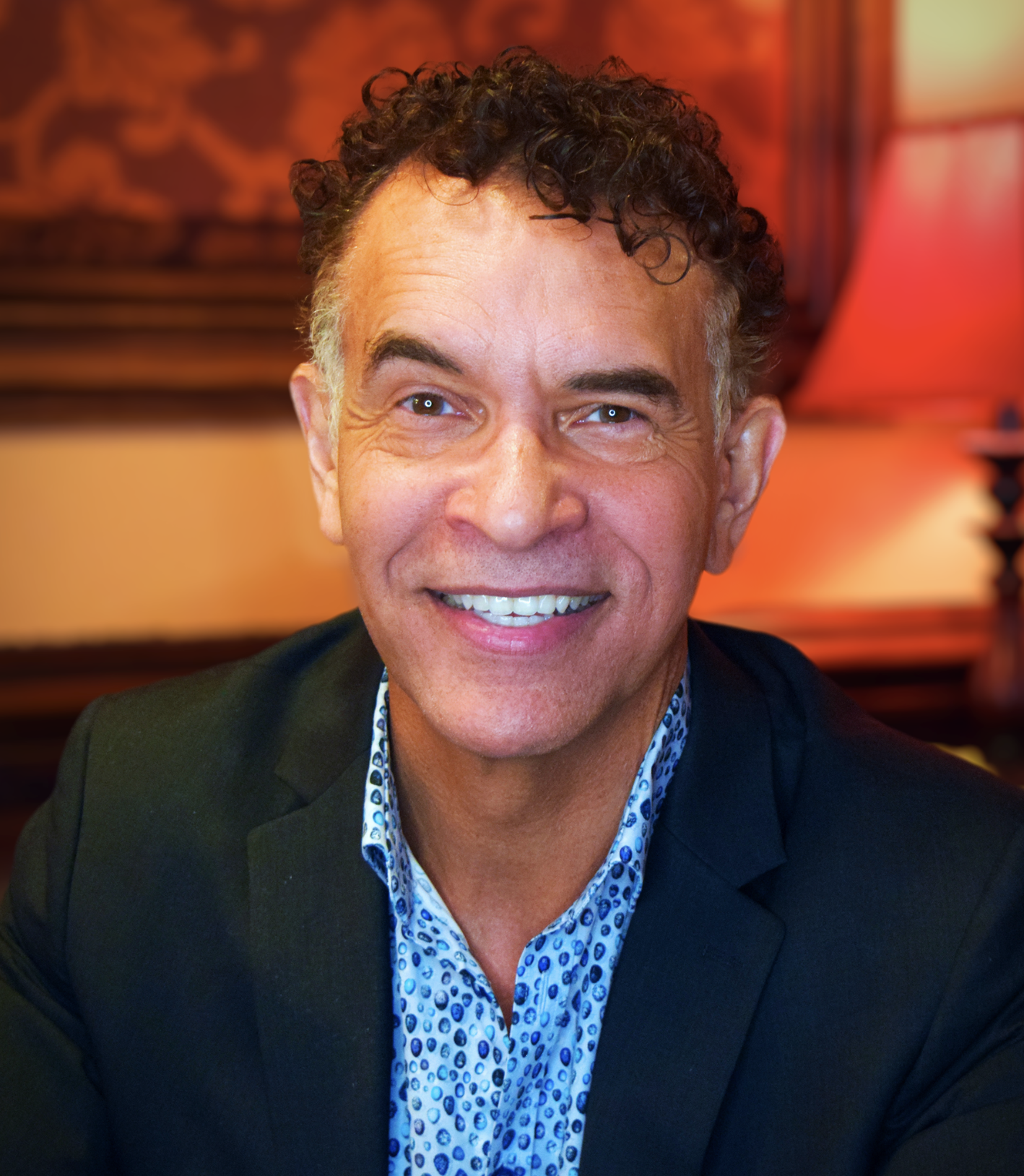
Brian Stokes Mitchell won for Kiss, Me Kate (2000)

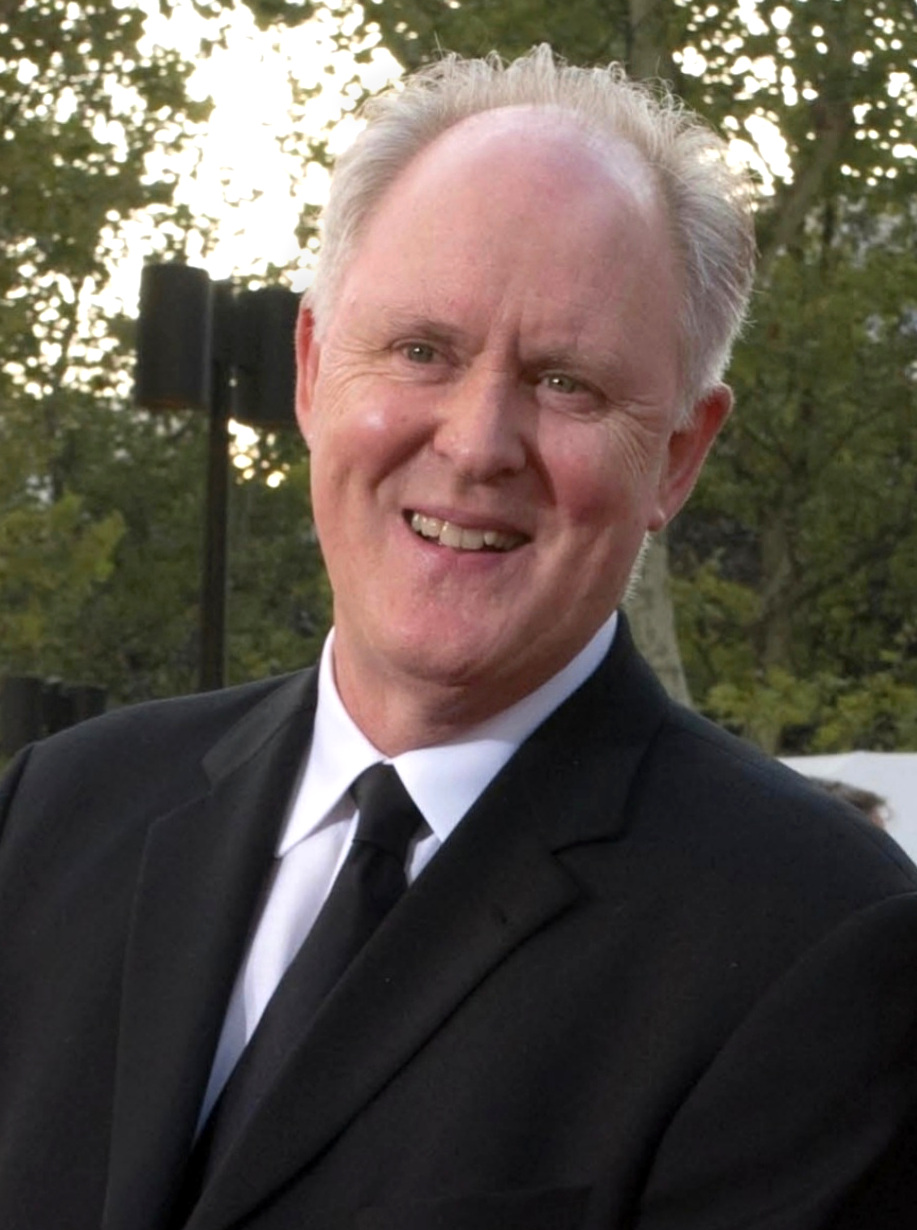
John Lithgow won for Sweet Smell of Success (2002)

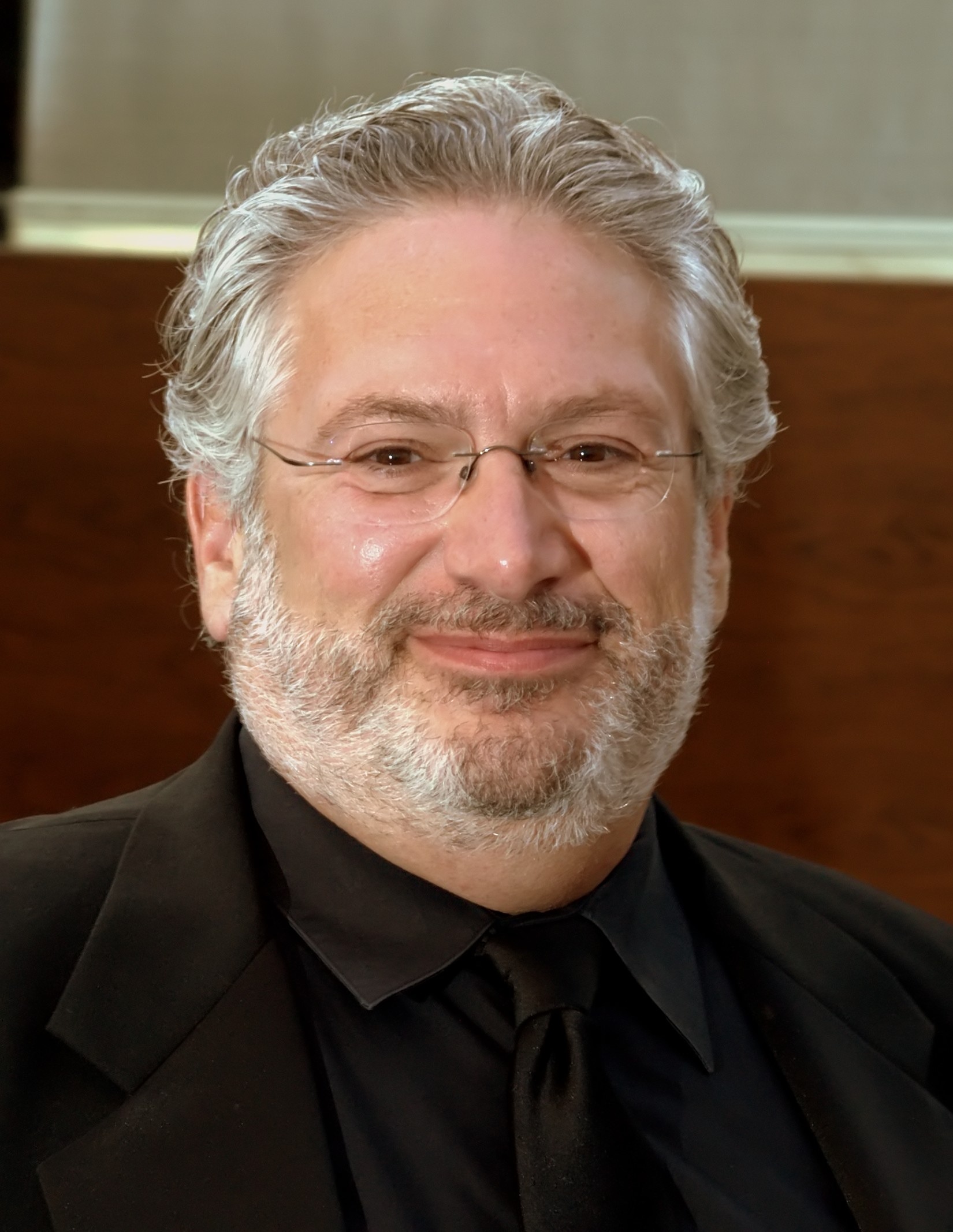
Harvey Fierstein won Hairspray (2003)

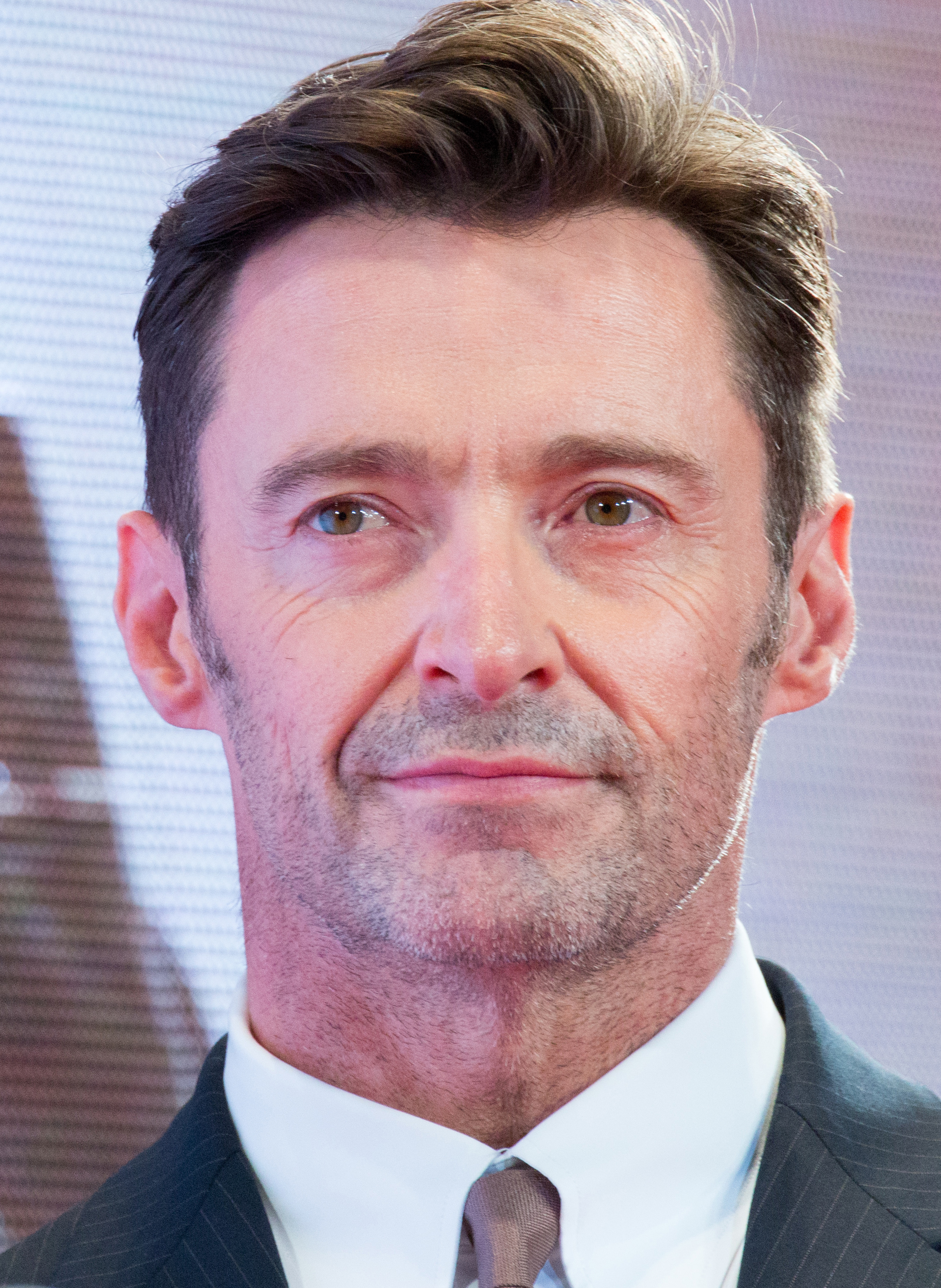
Hugh Jackman won for The Boy from Oz (2004)

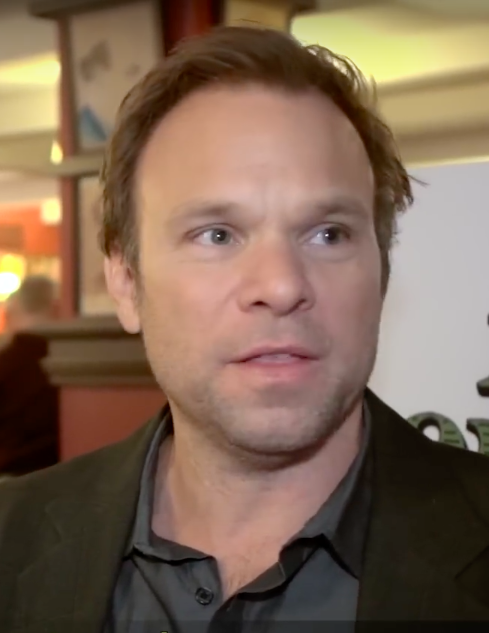
Norbert Leo Butz won for Dirty Rotten Scoundrels (2004) and for Catch Me If You Can (2011)

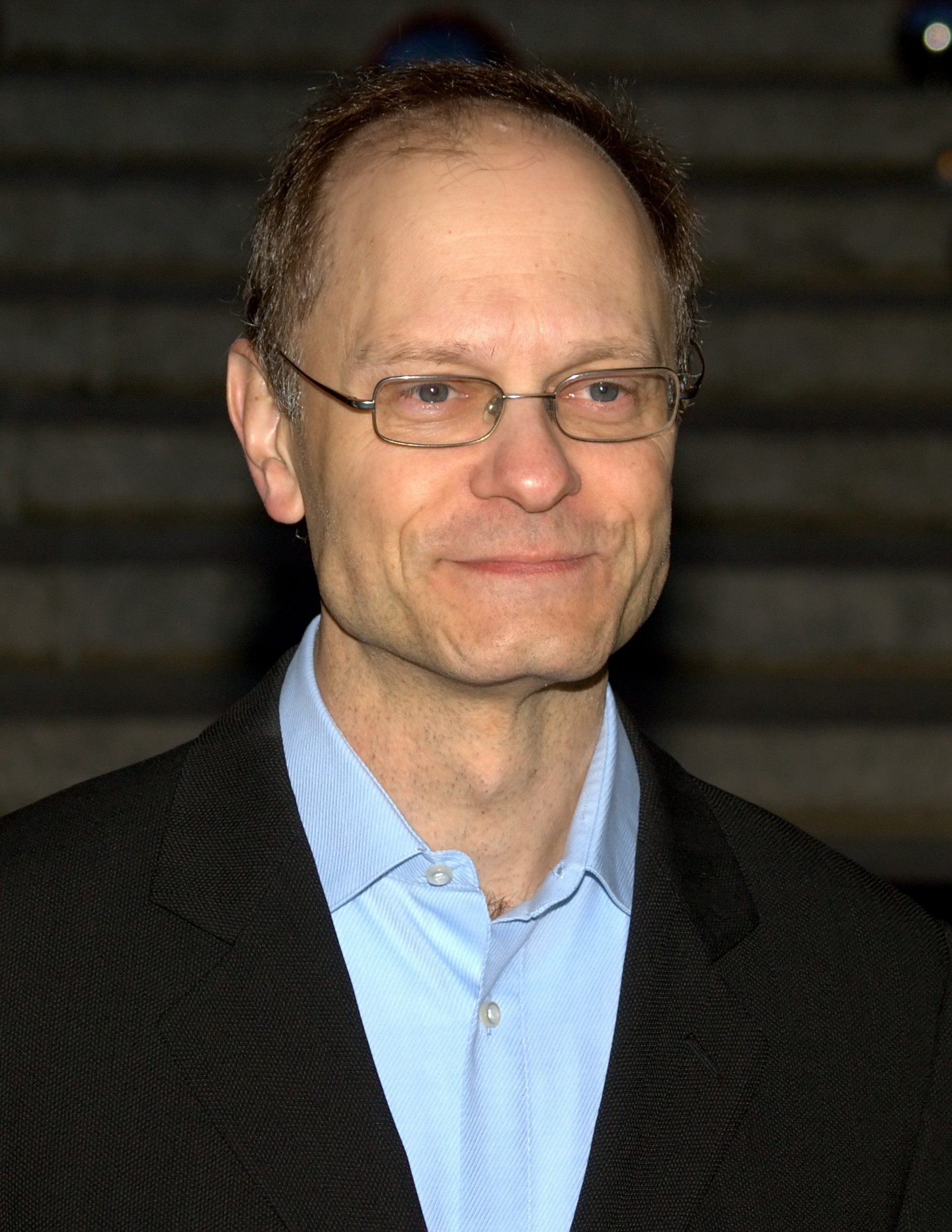
David Hyde Pierce won for Curtains (2007)

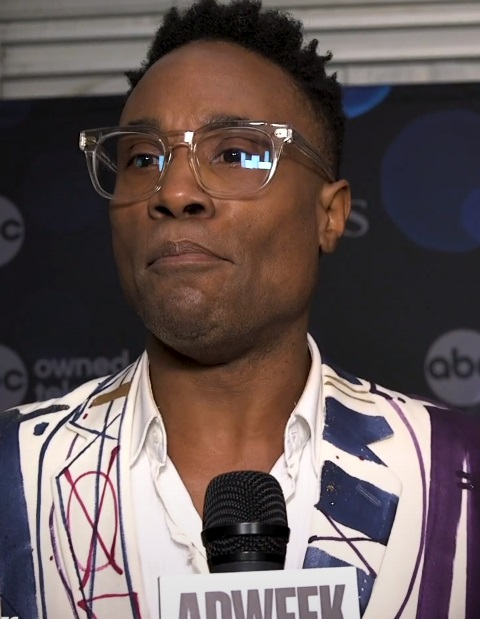
Billy Porter won for Kinky Boots (2013)

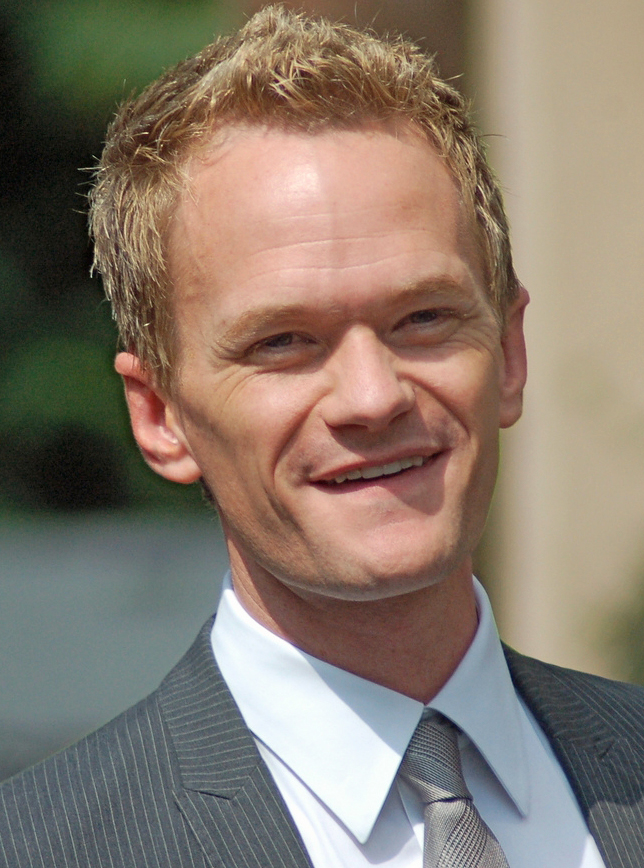
Neil Patrick Harris won for Hedwig and Angry Inch (2014)

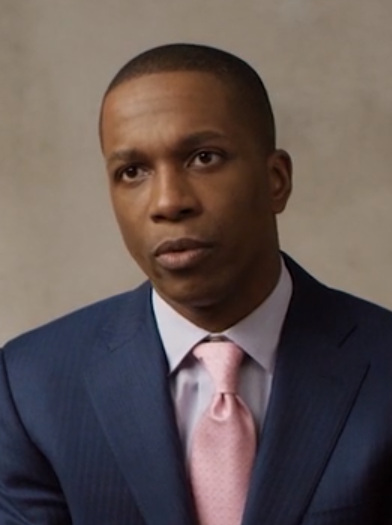
Leslie Odom Jr. won for Hamilton (2016)

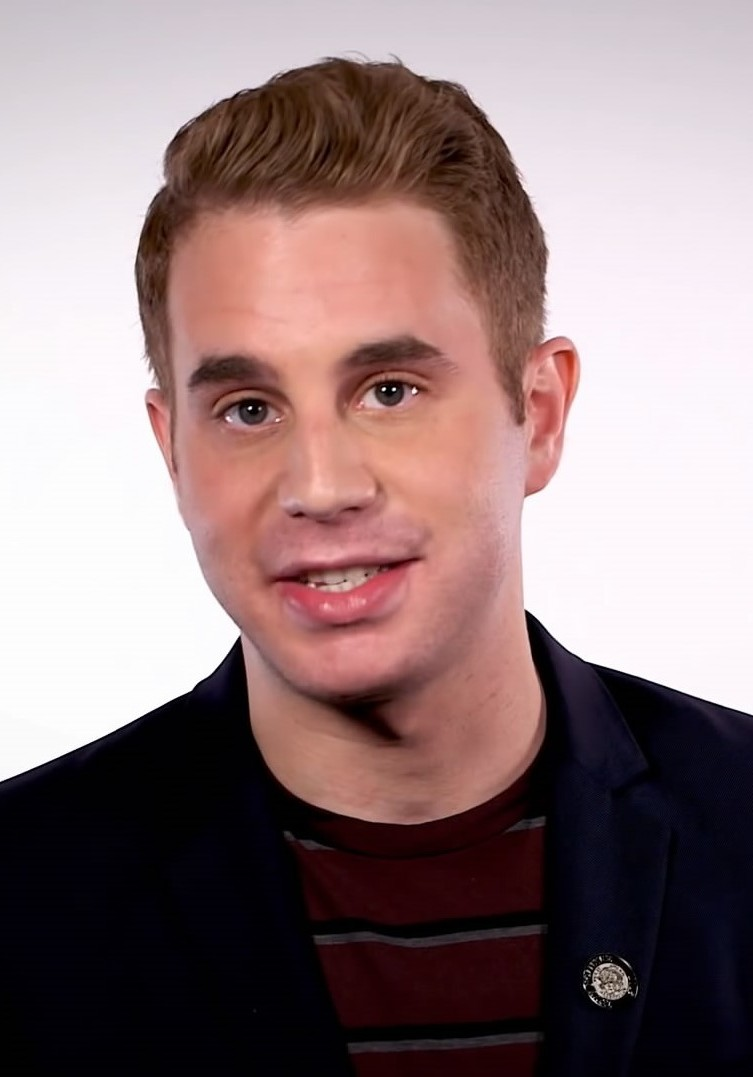
Ben Platt won for Dear Evan Hansen (2017)

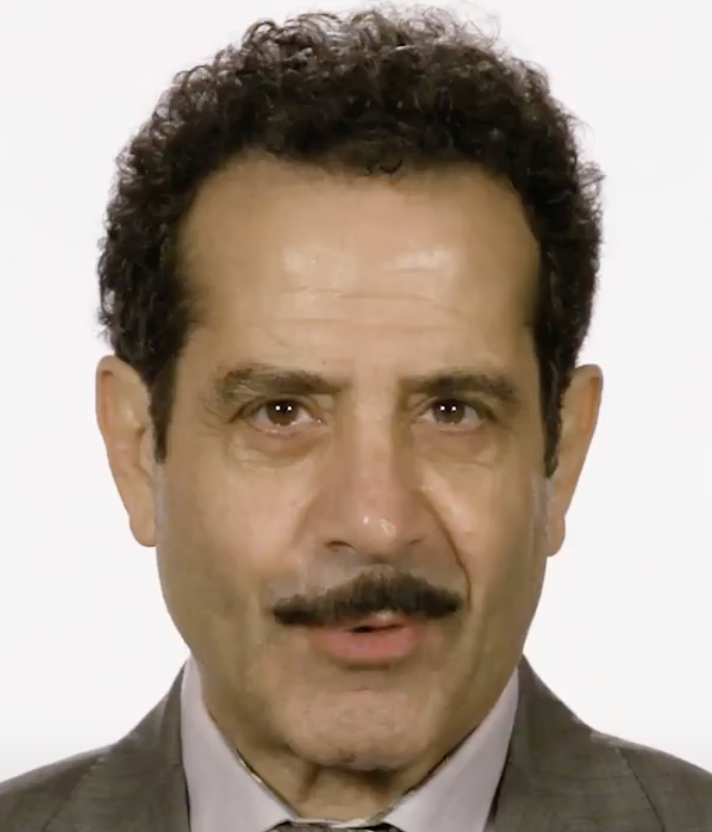
Tony Shalhoub won for The Band's Visit (2018)

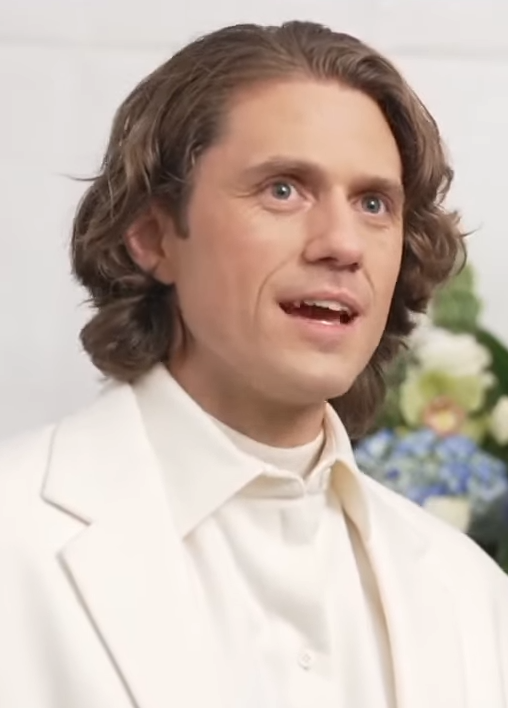
Aaron Tveit won for Moulin Rouge! The Musical (2020)

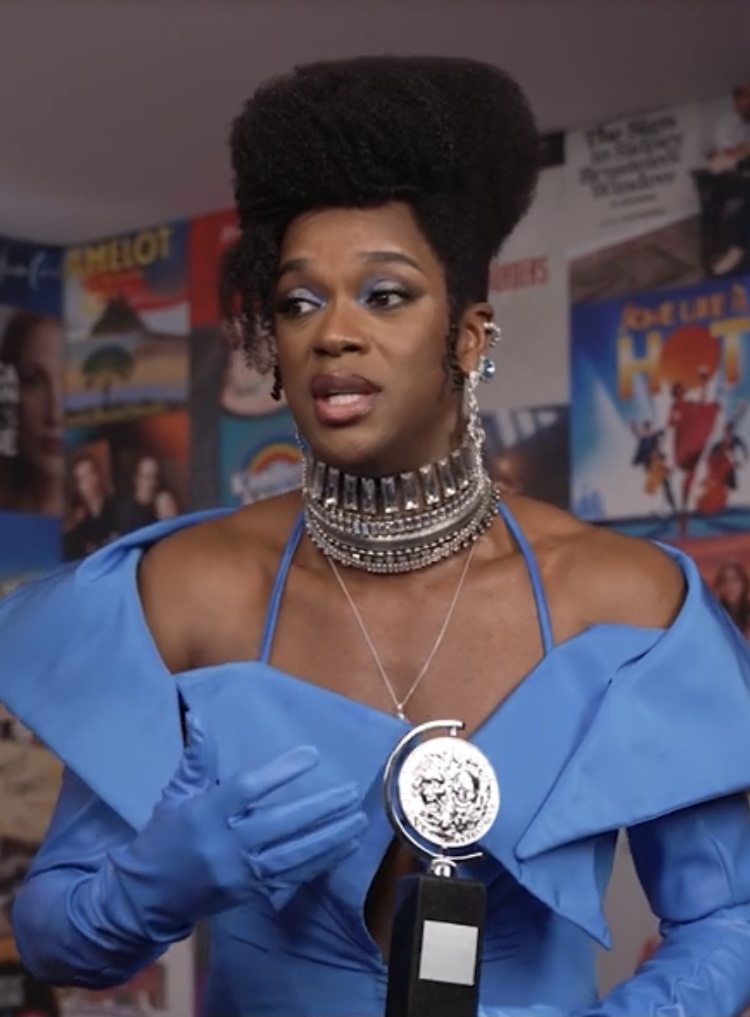
J. Harrison Ghee won for Some Like it Hot (2023)

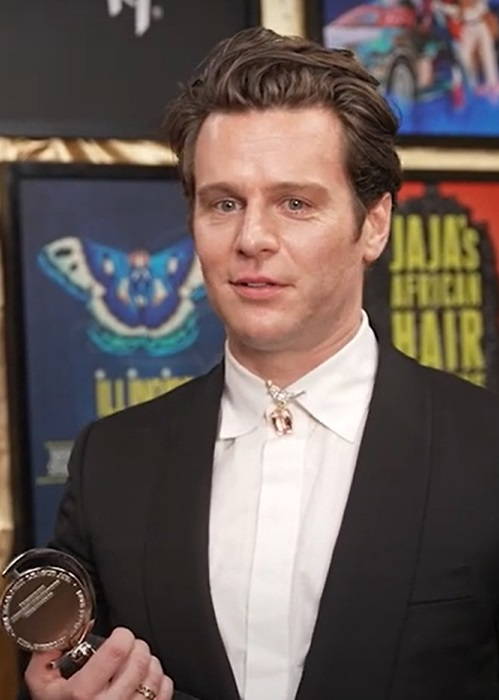
Jonathan Groff won for Merrily We Roll Along (2024)

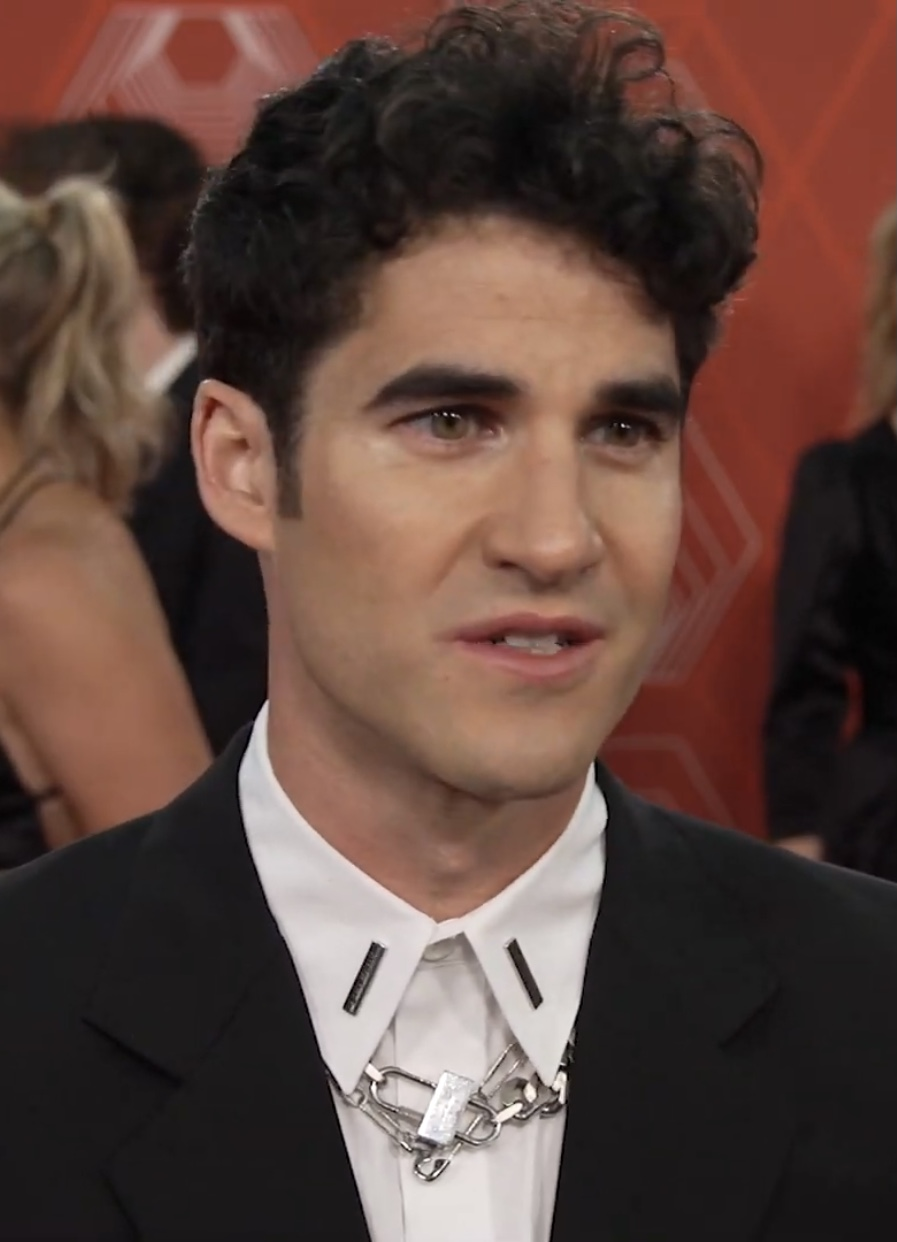
Darren Criss won for Maybe Happy Ending (2025)

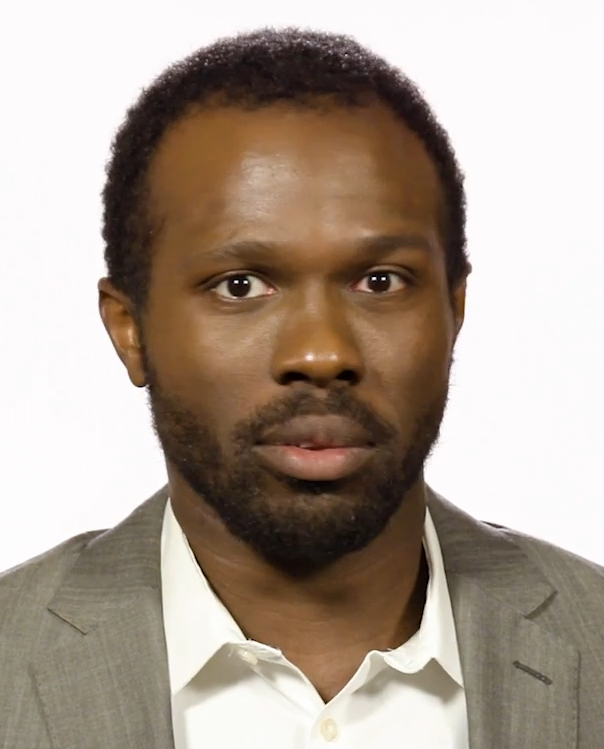
Joshua Henry won for Ragtime (2026)

=== 1940s ===
Year	Actor	Project	Role(s)	Ref.
1947 (1st)	Not awarded			
1948 (2nd)
1948 (2nd)	Paul Hartman	Angel in the Wings	Various Characters	
1949 (3rd)
1949 (3rd)	Ray Bolger	Where's Charley?	Charley Wykeham	

=== 1950s ===
Year	Actor	Project	Role(s)	Ref.
1950 (4th)
1950 (4th)	Ezio Pinza	South Pacific	Emile De Beque	
1951 (5th)
1951 (5th)	Robert Alda	Guys and Dolls	Sky Masterson	
1952 (6th)
1952 (6th)	Phil Silvers	Top Banana	Jerry Biffle	
1953 (7th)
1953 (7th)	Thomas Mitchell	Hazel Flagg	Dr. Downer	
1954 (8th)
1954 (8th)	Alfred Drake	Kismet	Hajj	
1955 (9th)
1955 (9th)	Walter Slezak	Fanny	Panisse	
1956 (10th)
1956 (10th)	Ray Walston	Damn Yankees	Mr. Applegate	
1956 (10th)	Stephen Douglass	Damn Yankees	Joe Hardy	
1956 (10th)	William Johnson	Pipe Dream	Doc	
1957 (11th)
1957 (11th)	Rex Harrison	My Fair Lady	Henry Higgins	
1957 (11th)	Fernando Lamas	Happy Hunting	Duke of Granada	
1957 (11th)	Robert Weede	The Most Happy Fella	Tony	
1958 (12th)
1958 (12th)	Robert Preston	The Music Man	Harold Hill	
1958 (12th)	Eddie Foy Jr.	Rumple	Rumple	
1958 (12th)	Ricardo Montalbán	Jamaica	Koli	
1958 (12th)	Tony Randall	Oh, Captain!	Captain Henry St. James	
1959 (13th)
1959 (13th)	Richard Kiley	Redhead	Tom Baxter	
1959 (13th)	Larry Blyden	Flower Drum Song	Sammy Fong	

=== 1960s ===
Year	Actor	Project	Role(s)	Ref.
1960 (14th)
1960 (14th)	Jackie Gleason	Take Me Along	Sid Davis	
1960 (14th)	Andy Griffith	Destry Rides Again	Destry	
1960 (14th)	Robert Morse	Take Me Along	Richard Miller	
1960 (14th)	Anthony Perkins	Greenwillow	Gideon Briggs	
1960 (14th)	Walter Pidgeon	Take Me Along	Nat Miller	
1961 (15th)
1961 (15th)	Richard Burton	Camelot	Arthur	
1961 (15th)	Maurice Evans	Tenderloin	Reverend Brock	
1961 (15th)	Phil Silvers	Do Re Mi	Hubert Cram	
1962 (16th)
1962 (16th)	Robert Morse	How to Succeed in Business Without Really Trying	J. Pierrepont Finch	
1962 (16th)	Ray Bolger	All-American	Professor Fodorski	
1962 (16th)	Alfred Drake	Kean	Edmund Kean	
1962 (16th)	Richard Kiley	No Strings	David Jordan	
1963 (17th)
1963 (17th)	Zero Mostel	A Funny Thing Happened on the Way to the Forum	Pseudolus	
1963 (17th)	Sid Caesar	Little Me	Various Characters	
1963 (17th)	Anthony Newley	Stop the World – I Want to Get Off	Littlechap	
1963 (17th)	Clive Revill	Oliver!	Fagin	
1964 (18th)
1964 (18th)	Bert Lahr	Foxy	Foxy	
1964 (18th)	Sydney Chaplin	Funny Girl	Nick Arnstein	
1964 (18th)	Bob Fosse	Pal Joey	Joey Evans	
1964 (18th)	Steve Lawrence	What Makes Sammy Run?	Sammy Glick	
1965 (19th)
1965 (19th)	Zero Mostel	Fiddler on the Roof	Tevye	
1965 (19th)	Sammy Davis Jr.	Golden Boy	Joe Wellington	
1965 (19th)	Cyril Ritchard	The Roar of the Greasepaint – The Smell of the Crowd	Sir	
1965 (19th)	Tommy Steele	Half a Sixpence	Arthur Kipps	
1966 (20th)
1966 (20th)	Richard Kiley	Man of La Mancha	Don Quixote / Cervantes	
1966 (20th)	Jack Cassidy	It's a Bird...It's a Plane...It's Superman	Max Mencken	
1966 (20th)	John Cullum	On a Clear Day You Can See Forever	Dr. Mark Bruckner	
1966 (20th)	Harry Secombe	Pickwick	Pickwick	
1967 (21st)
1967 (21st)	Robert Preston	I Do! I Do!	Michael	
1967 (21st)	Alan Alda	The Apple Tree	Various Characters	
1967 (21st)	Jack Gilford	Cabaret	Herr Schultz	
1967 (21st)	Norman Wisdom	Walking Happy	Will Mossop	
1968 (22nd)
1968 (22nd)	Robert Goulet	The Happy Time	Jacques Bonnard	
1968 (22nd)	Robert Hooks	Hallelujah, Baby!	Clem	
1968 (22nd)	Tony Roberts	How Now, Dow Jones	Charley	
1968 (22nd)	David Wayne	The Happy Time	Grandpere Bonnard	
1969 (23rd)
1969 (23rd)	Jerry Orbach	Promises, Promises	Chuck Baxter	
1969 (23rd)	Herschel Bernardi	Zorba	Zorba	
1969 (23rd)	Jack Cassidy	Maggie Flynn	The Clown	
1969 (23rd)	Joel Grey	George M!	George M. Cohan	

=== 1970s ===
Year	Actor	Project	Role(s)	Ref.
1970 (24th)
1970 (24th)	Cleavon Little	Purlie	Purlie	
1970 (24th)	Len Cariou	Applause	Bill Sampson	
1970 (24th)	Robert Weede	Cry for Us All	Edward Quinn	
1971 (25th)
1971 (25th)	Hal Linden	The Rothschilds	Mayer Rothschild	
1971 (25th)	David Burns	Lovely Ladies, Kind Gentlemen	Col. Wainwright Purdy III	
1971 (25th)	Larry Kert	Company	Bobby	
1971 (25th)	Bobby Van	No, No, Nanette	Billy Early	
1972 (26th)
1972 (26th)	Phil Silvers	A Funny Thing Happened on the Way to the Forum	Pseudolus	
1972 (26th)	Barry Bostwick	Grease	Danny Zuko	
1972 (26th)	Clifton Davis	Two Gentlemen of Verona	Valentine	
1972 (26th)	Raul Julia	Two Gentlemen of Verona	Proteus	
1973 (27th)
1973 (27th)	Ben Vereen	Pippin	The Leading Player	
1973 (27th)	Len Cariou	A Little Night Music	Frederick Egerman	
1973 (27th)	Robert Morse	Sugar	Jerry	
1973 (27th)	Brock Peters	Lost in the Stars	Stephen Kumalo	
1974 (28th)
1974 (28th)	Christopher Plummer	Cyrano	Cyrano de Bergerac	
1974 (28th)	Alfred Drake	Gigi	Honore Lachailles	
1974 (28th)	Joe Morton	Raisin	Walter Lee Younger	
1974 (28th)	Lewis J. Stadlen	Candide	Various Characters	
1975 (29th)
1975 (29th)	John Cullum	Shenandoah	Charlie Anderson	
1975 (29th)	Joel Grey	Goodtime Charley	Charley	
1975 (29th)	Raul Julia	Where's Charley?	Charley Wykeham	
1975 (29th)	Eddie Mekka	The Lieutenant	Lieutenant	
1975 (29th)	Robert Preston	Mack & Mabel	Mack Sennett	
1976 (30th)
1976 (30th)	George Rose	My Fair Lady	Alfred P. Doolittle	
1976 (30th)	Mako	Pacific Overtures	Various Characters	
1976 (30th)	Jerry Orbach	Chicago	Billy Flynn	
1976 (30th)	Ian Richardson	My Fair Lady	Henry Higgins	
1977 (31st)
1977 (31st)	Barry Bostwick	The Robber Bridegroom	Jamie Lockhart	
1977 (31st)	Robert Guillaume	Guys and Dolls	Nathan Detroit	
1977 (31st)	Raul Julia	The Threepenny Opera	Macheath	
1977 (31st)	Reid Shelton	Annie	Oliver Warbucks	
1978 (32nd)
1978 (32nd)	John Cullum	On the Twentieth Century	Oscar Jaffee	
1978 (32nd)	Eddie Bracken	Hello, Dolly!	Horace Vandergelder	
1978 (32nd)	Barry Nelson	The Act	Dan Conners	
1978 (32nd)	Gilbert Price	Timbuktu!	The Mansa of Mali	
1979 (33rd)
1979 (33rd)	Len Cariou	Sweeney Todd: The Demon Barber of Fleet Street	Sweeney Todd	
1979 (33rd)	Vincent Gardenia	Ballroom	Alfred Rossi	
1979 (33rd)	Joel Grey	The Grand Tour	S. L. Jacobowsky	
1979 (33rd)	Robert Klein	They're Playing Our Song	Vernon Gersch	

=== 1980s ===
Year	Actor	Project	Role(s)	Ref.
1980 (34th)
1980 (34th)	Jim Dale	Barnum	P. T. Barnum	
1980 (34th)	Gregory Hines	Comin' Uptown	Scrooge	
1980 (34th)	Mickey Rooney	Sugar Babies	Mickey	
1980 (34th)	Giorgio Tozzi	The Most Happy Fella	Tony	
1981 (35th)
1981 (35th)	Kevin Kline	The Pirates of Penzance	The Pirate King	
1981 (35th)	Gregory Hines	Sophisticated Ladies	Performer	
1981 (35th)	George Rose	The Pirates of Penzance	Major-General	
1981 (35th)	Martin Vidnovic	Brigadoon	Tommy Albright	
1982 (36th)
1982 (36th)	Ben Harney	Dreamgirls	Curtis Taylor Jr.	
1982 (36th)	Herschel Bernardi	Fiddler on the Roof	Tevye	
1982 (36th)	Victor Garber	Little Me	Various Characters	
1982 (36th)	Raul Julia	Nine	Guido Contini	
1983 (37th)
1983 (37th)	Tommy Tune	My One and Only	Captain Billy Buck Chandler	
1983 (37th)	Al Green	Your Arms Too Short to Box with God	Performer	
1983 (37th)	George Hearn	A Doll's Life	Various Characters	
1983 (37th)	Michael V. Smartt	Porgy and Bess	Porgy	
1984 (38th)
1984 (38th)	George Hearn	La Cage aux Folles	Albin	
1984 (38th)	Gene Barry	La Cage aux Folles	Georges	
1984 (38th)	Ron Moody	Oliver!	Fagin	
1984 (38th)	Mandy Patinkin	Sunday in the Park with George	Georges Seurat / George	
1985 (39th)	Not awarded (Note: The category was not given due to an insufficient number of musicals during the season.)			
1986 (40th)
1986 (40th)	George Rose	The Mystery of Edwin Drood	Mayor Thomas Sapsea / William Cartwright	
1986 (40th)	Don Correia	Singin' in the Rain	Don Lockwood	
1986 (40th)	Cleavant Derricks	Big Deal	Charley	
1986 (40th)	Maurice Hines	Uptown... It's Hot!	Performer	
1987 (41st)
1987 (41st)	Robert Lindsay	Me and My Girl	Bill Snibson	
1987 (41st)	Roderick Cook	Oh, Coward!	Performer	
1987 (41st)	Terrence Mann	Les Misérables	Javert	
1987 (41st)	Colm Wilkinson	Les Misérables	Jean Valjean	
1988 (42nd)
1988 (42nd)	Michael Crawford	The Phantom of the Opera	The Phantom of the Opera	
1988 (42nd)	Scott Bakula	Romance/Romance	Alfred Von Wilmers / Sam	
1988 (42nd)	David Carroll	Chess	Anatoly Sergievsky	
1988 (42nd)	Howard McGillin	Anything Goes	Billy Crocker	
1989 (43rd)
1989 (43rd)	Jason Alexander	Jerome Robbins' Broadway	Various Characters	
1989 (43rd)	Gabriel Barre	Starmites	Trinkulus	
1989 (43rd)	Robert La Fosse	Jerome Robbins' Broadway	Various Characters	
1989 (43rd)	Brian Lane Green	Starmites	Spacepunk	

=== 1990s ===
Year	Actor	Project	Role(s)	Ref.
1990 (44th)
1990 (44th)	James Naughton	City of Angels	Stone	
1990 (44th)	David Carroll	Grand Hotel	Felix Von Gaigern	
1990 (44th)	Gregg Edelman	City of Angels	Stine	
1990 (44th)	Bob Gunton	Sweeney Todd: The Demon Barber of Fleet Street	Sweeney Todd	
1991 (45th)
1991 (45th)	Jonathan Pryce	Miss Saigon	The Engineer	
1991 (45th)	Keith Carradine	The Will Rogers Follies	Will Rogers	
1991 (45th)	Paul Hipp	Buddy – The Buddy Holly Story	Buddy Holly	
1991 (45th)	Topol	Fiddler on the Roof	Tevye	
1992 (46th)
1992 (46th)	Gregory Hines	Jelly's Last Jam	Jelly Roll Morton	
1992 (46th)	Harry Groener	Crazy for You	Bobby Child	
1992 (46th)	Nathan Lane	Guys and Dolls	Nathan Detroit	
1992 (46th)	Michael Rupert	Falsettos	Marvin	
1993 (47th)
1993 (47th)	Brent Carver	Kiss of the Spider Woman	Luis Molina	
1993 (47th)	Tim Curry	My Favorite Year	Alan Swann	
1993 (47th)	Con O'Neill	Blood Brothers	Mickey	
1993 (47th)	Martin Short	The Goodbye Girl	Elliot Garfield	
1994 (48th)
1994 (48th)	Boyd Gaines	She Loves Me	Georg Nowack	
1994 (48th)	Victor Garber	Damn Yankees	Mr. Applegate	
1994 (48th)	Terrence Mann	Beauty and the Beast	The Beast	
1994 (48th)	Jere Shea	Passion	Giorgio	
1995 (49th)
1995 (49th)	Matthew Broderick	How to Succeed in Business Without Really Trying	J. Pierrepont Finch	
1995 (49th)	Alan Campbell	Sunset Boulevard	Joe Gillis	
1995 (49th)	Mark Jacoby	Show Boat	Gaylord Ravenal	
1995 (49th)	John McMartin	Show Boat	Cap'n Andy	
1996 (50th)
1996 (50th)	Nathan Lane	A Funny Thing Happened on the Way to the Forum	Pseudolus	
1996 (50th)	Savion Glover	Bring in 'da Noise, Bring in 'da Funk	'da Beat / Lil' Dahlin'	
1996 (50th)	Adam Pascal	Rent	Roger Davis	
1996 (50th)	Lou Diamond Phillips	The King and I	The King of Siam	
1997 (51st)
1997 (51st)	James Naughton	Chicago	Billy Flynn	
1997 (51st)	Robert Cuccioli	Jekyll & Hyde	Dr. Henry Jekyll / Edward Hyde	
1997 (51st)	Jim Dale	Candide	Dr. Pangloss	
1997 (51st)	Daniel McDonald	Steel Pier	Bill Kelly	
1998 (52nd)
1998 (52nd)	Alan Cumming	Cabaret	The Master of Ceremonies	
1998 (52nd)	Peter Friedman	Ragtime	Tateh	
1998 (52nd)	Douglas Sills	The Scarlet Pimpernel	Percy Blakeney	
1998 (52nd)	Brian Stokes Mitchell	Ragtime	Coalhouse Walker Jr.	
1999 (53rd)
1999 (53rd)	Martin Short	Little Me	Various Characters	
1999 (53rd)	Brent Carver	Parade	Leo Frank	
1999 (53rd)	Adam Cooper	Swan Lake	The Swan	
1999 (53rd)	Tom Wopat	Annie Get Your Gun	Frank Butler	

=== 2000s ===
Year	Actor	Project	Role(s)	Ref.
2000 (54th)
2000 (54th)	Brian Stokes Mitchell	Kiss Me, Kate	Fred Graham / Petruchio	
2000 (54th)	Craig Bierko	The Music Man	Harold Hill	
2000 (54th)	George Hearn	Putting It Together	The Husband	
2000 (54th)	Mandy Patinkin	The Wild Party	Burrs	
2000 (54th)	Christopher Walken	The Dead	Gabriel Conroy	
2001 (55th)
2001 (55th)	Nathan Lane	The Producers	Max Bialystock	
2001 (55th)	Matthew Broderick	The Producers	Leo Bloom	
2001 (55th)	Kevin Chamberlin	Seussical	Horton the Elephant	
2001 (55th)	Tom Hewitt	The Rocky Horror Show	Dr. Frank-N-Furter	
2001 (55th)	Patrick Wilson	The Full Monty	Jerry Lukowski	
2002 (56th)
2002 (56th)	John Lithgow	Sweet Smell of Success	J.J. Hunsecker	
2002 (56th)	Gavin Creel	Thoroughly Modern Millie	Jimmy Smith	
2002 (56th)	John Cullum	Urinetown	Caldwell B. Cladwell	
2002 (56th)	John McMartin	Into the Woods	Narrator / Mysterious Man	
2002 (56th)	Patrick Wilson	Oklahoma!	Curly McLain	
2003 (57th)
2003 (57th)	Harvey Fierstein	Hairspray	Edna Turnblad	
2003 (57th)	Antonio Banderas	Nine	Guido Contini	
2003 (57th)	Malcolm Gets	Amour	Dusoleil	
2003 (57th)	John Selya	Movin' Out	Eddie	
2003 (57th)	Brian Stokes Mitchell	Man of La Mancha	Don Quixote / Cervantes	
2004 (58th)
2004 (58th)	Hugh Jackman	The Boy from Oz	Peter Allen	
2004 (58th)	Hunter Foster	Little Shop of Horrors	Seymour	
2004 (58th)	Alfred Molina	Fiddler on the Roof	Tevye	
2004 (58th)	Euan Morton	Taboo	George	
2004 (58th)	John Tartaglia	Avenue Q	Princeton / Rod	
2005 (59th)
2005 (59th)	Norbert Leo Butz	Dirty Rotten Scoundrels	Freddy Benson	
2005 (59th)	Hank Azaria	Spamalot	Various Characters	
2005 (59th)	Gary Beach	La Cage aux Folles	Albin	
2005 (59th)	Tim Curry	Spamalot	King Arthur	
2005 (59th)	John Lithgow	Dirty Rotten Scoundrels	Lawrence Jameson	
2006 (60th)
2006 (60th)	John Lloyd Young	Jersey Boys	Frankie Valli	
2006 (60th)	Michael Cerveris	Sweeney Todd: The Demon Barber of Fleet Street	Sweeney Todd	
2006 (60th)	Harry Connick Jr.	The Pajama Game	Sid Sorokin	
2006 (60th)	Stephen Lynch	The Wedding Singer	Robbie Hart	
2006 (60th)	Bob Martin	The Drowsy Chaperone	Man in Chair	
2007 (61st)
2007 (61st)	David Hyde Pierce	Curtains	Lieutenant Frank Cioffi	
2007 (61st)	Michael Cerveris	LoveMusik	Kurt Weill	
2007 (61st)	Raúl Esparza	Company	Robert	
2007 (61st)	Jonathan Groff	Spring Awakening	Melchior Gabor	
2007 (61st)	Gavin Lee	Mary Poppins	Bert	
2008 (62nd)
2008 (62nd)	Paulo Szot	Rodgers & Hammerstein's South Pacific	Emile de Becque	
2008 (62nd)	Daniel Evans	Sunday in the Park with George	Georges Seurat / George	
2008 (62nd)	Lin-Manuel Miranda	In the Heights	Usnavi	
2008 (62nd)	Stew	Passing Strange	Narrator	
2008 (62nd)	Tom Wopat	A Catered Affair	Tom Hurley	
2009 (63rd)
2009 (63rd)	David Alvarez, Trent Kowalik and Kiril Kulish	Billy Elliot the Musical	Billy Elliot	
2009 (63rd)	Gavin Creel	Hair	Claude	
2009 (63rd)	Brian d'Arcy James	Shrek the Musical	Shrek	
2009 (63rd)	Constantine Maroulis	Rock of Ages	Drew	
2009 (63rd)	J. Robert Spencer	Next to Normal	Dan Goodman	

=== 2010s ===
Year	Actor	Project(s)	Role(s)	Ref.
2010 (64th)
2010 (64th)	Douglas Hodge	La Cage aux Folles	Albin	
2010 (64th)	Kelsey Grammer	La Cage aux Folles	Georges	
2010 (64th)	Sean Hayes	Promises, Promises	Chuck Baxter	
2010 (64th)	Chad Kimball	Memphis	Huey Calhoun	
2010 (64th)	Sahr Ngaujah	Fela!	Fela Kuti	
2011 (65th)
2011 (65th)	Norbert Leo Butz	Catch Me If You Can	Carl Hanratty	
2011 (65th)	Josh Gad	The Book of Mormon	Elder Cunningham	
2011 (65th)	Joshua Henry	The Scottsboro Boys	Haywood Patterson	
2011 (65th)	Andrew Rannells	The Book of Mormon	Elder Price	
2011 (65th)	Tony Sheldon	Priscilla, Queen of the Desert	Bernadette Bassenger	
2012 (66th)
2012 (66th)	Steve Kazee	Once	Guy	
2012 (66th)	Danny Burstein	Follies	Buddy Plummer	
2012 (66th)	Jeremy Jordan	Newsies	Jack Kelly	
2012 (66th)	Norm Lewis	Porgy and Bess	Porgy	
2012 (66th)	Ron Raines	Follies	Ben Stone	
2013 (67th)
2013 (67th)	Billy Porter	Kinky Boots	Lola / Simon	
2013 (67th)	Bertie Carvel	Matilda the Musical	Miss Trunchbull	
2013 (67th)	Santino Fontana	Rodgers + Hammerstein's Cinderella	Prince Topher	
2013 (67th)	Rob McClure	Chaplin	Charlie Chaplin	
2013 (67th)	Stark Sands	Kinky Boots	Charlie Price	
2014 (68th)
2014 (68th)	Neil Patrick Harris	Hedwig and the Angry Inch	Hedwig Schmidt	
2014 (68th)	Ramin Karimloo	Les Misérables	Jean Valjean	
2014 (68th)	Andy Karl	Rocky the Musical	Rocky Balboa	
2014 (68th)	Jefferson Mays	A Gentleman's Guide to Love and Murder	The D'Ysquith Family	
2014 (68th)	Bryce Pinkham	A Gentleman's Guide to Love and Murder	Monty Navarro	
2015 (69th)
2015 (69th)	Michael Cerveris	Fun Home	Bruce Bechdel	
2015 (69th)	Brian d'Arcy James	Something Rotten!	Nick Bottom	
2015 (69th)	Robert Fairchild	An American in Paris	Jerry Mulligan	
2015 (69th)	Ken Watanabe	The King and I	The King of Siam	
2015 (69th)	Tony Yazbeck	On the Town	Gabey	
2016 (70th)
2016 (70th)	Leslie Odom Jr.	Hamilton	Aaron Burr	
2016 (70th)	Alex Brightman	School of Rock	Dewey Finn	
2016 (70th)	Danny Burstein	Fiddler on the Roof	Tevye	
2016 (70th)	Zachary Levi	She Loves Me	Georg Nowack	
2016 (70th)	Lin-Manuel Miranda	Hamilton	Alexander Hamilton	
2017 (71st)
2017 (71st)	Ben Platt	Dear Evan Hansen	Evan Hansen	
2017 (71st)	Christian Borle	Falsettos	Marvin	
2017 (71st)	Josh Groban	Natasha, Pierre & The Great Comet of 1812	Pierre Bezukhov	
2017 (71st)	Andy Karl	Groundhog Day	Phil Connors	
2017 (71st)	David Hyde Pierce	Hello, Dolly!	Horace Vandergelder	
2018 (72nd)
2018 (72nd)	Tony Shalhoub	The Band's Visit	Tewfiq Zakaria	
2018 (72nd)	Harry Hadden-Paton	My Fair Lady	Henry Higgins	
2018 (72nd)	Joshua Henry	Carousel	Billy Bigelow	
2018 (72nd)	Ethan Slater	SpongeBob SquarePants	SpongeBob SquarePants	
2019 (73rd)
2019 (73rd)	Santino Fontana	Tootsie	Michael Dorsey / Dorothy Michaels	
2019 (73rd)	Brooks Ashmanskas	The Prom	Barry Glickman	
2019 (73rd)	Derrick Baskin	Ain’t Too Proud	Otis Williams	
2019 (73rd)	Alex Brightman	Beetlejuice	Beetlejuice	
2019 (73rd)	Damon Daunno	Oklahoma!	Curly McLain	

=== 2020s ===
Year	Actor	Project	Role(s)
2020 (74th)
2020 (74th)	Aaron Tveit	Moulin Rouge! The Musical	Christian
2022 (75th)
2022 (75th)	Myles Frost	MJ	MJ
2022 (75th)	Billy Crystal	Mr. Saturday Night	Buddy Young, Jr.
2022 (75th)	Hugh Jackman	The Music Man	Harold Hill
2022 (75th)	Rob McClure	Mrs. Doubtfire	Daniel Hillard
2022 (75th)	Jaquel Spivey	A Strange Loop	Usher
2023 (76th)
2023 (76th)	J. Harrison Ghee	Some Like It Hot	Jerry/Daphne
2023 (76th)	Christian Borle	Some Like It Hot	Joe/Josephine
2023 (76th)	Josh Groban	Sweeney Todd: The Demon Barber of Fleet Street	Sweeney Todd
2023 (76th)	Brian d'Arcy James	Into the Woods	The Baker
2023 (76th)	Ben Platt	Parade	Leo Frank
2023 (76th)	Colton Ryan	New York, New York	Jimmy Doyle
2024 (77th)
2024 (77th)	Jonathan Groff	Merrily We Roll Along	Franklin Shepard
2024 (77th)	Brody Grant	The Outsiders	Ponyboy Curtis
2024 (77th)	Dorian Harewood	The Notebook	Older Noah Calhoun
2024 (77th)	Brian d'Arcy James	Days of Wine and Roses	Joe Clay
2024 (77th)	Eddie Redmayne	Cabaret at the Kit Kat Club	Emcee
2025 (78th)
2025 (78th)	Darren Criss	Maybe Happy Ending	Oliver
2025 (78th)	Andrew Durand	Dead Outlaw	Elmer McCurdy
2025 (78th)	Tom Francis	Sunset Blvd.	Joe Gillis
2025 (78th)	Jonathan Groff	Just in Time	Bobby Darin
2025 (78th)	James Monroe Iglehart	A Wonderful World: The Louis Armstrong Musical	Louis Armstrong
2025 (78th)	Jeremy Jordan	Floyd Collins	Floyd Collins
2026 (79th)
2026 (79th)	Joshua Henry	Ragtime	Coalhouse Walker Jr.
2026 (79th)	Nicholas Christopher	Chess	Anatoly Sergievsky
2026 (79th)	Luke Evans	The Rocky Horror Show	Dr. Frank-N-Furter
2026 (79th)	Sam Tutty	Two Strangers (Carry a Cake Across New York)	Dougal Todd
2026 (79th)	Brandon Uranowitz	Ragtime	Tateh

== Most wins ==
2 wins

- Norbert Leo Butz
- John Cullum
- Richard Kiley
- Nathan Lane
- Zero Mostel
- James Naughton
- Robert Preston
- George Rose
- Phil Silvers

== Most nominations ==
4 nominations

- John Cullum
- Brian d'Arcy James
- Raul Julia

3 nominations

- Len Cariou
- Michael Cerveris
- Alfred Drake
- Joel Grey
- Jonathan Groff
- George Hearn
- Joshua Henry
- Gregory Hines
- Richard Kiley
- Nathan Lane
- Brian Stokes Mitchell
- Robert Morse
- Robert Preston
- George Rose
- Phil Silvers

2 nominations

- Herschel Bernardi
- Ray Bolger
- Christian Borle
- Barry Bostwick
- Alex Brightman
- Matthew Broderick
- Danny Burstein
- Norbert Leo Butz
- David Carroll
- Brent Carver
- Jack Cassidy
- Kevin Chamberlin
- Gavin Creel
- Tim Curry
- Jim Dale
- Santino Fontana
- Victor Garber
- Josh Groban
- Hugh Jackman
- Jeremy Jordan
- Andy Karl
- John Lithgow
- Terrence Mann
- Rob McClure
- John McMartin
- Lin-Manuel Miranda
- Zero Mostel
- James Naughton
- Jerry Orbach
- Mandy Patinkin
- David Hyde Pierce
- Ben Platt
- Martin Short
- Robert Weede
- Patrick Wilson
- Tom Wopat

== Character win total ==
3 wins

- Pseudolus from A Funny Thing Happened on the Way to the Forum

2 wins

- Albin from La Cage aux Folles
- Emile de Becque from South Pacific
- J. Pierrepont Finch from How to Succeed in Business Without Really Trying

== Character nomination total ==
5 nominations

- Tevye from Fiddler on the Roof

4 nominations

- Sweeney Todd from Sweeney Todd

3 nominations

- Albin from La Cage aux Folles
- Noble Eggleston / Val du Val / Fred Poitrine from Little Me †
- Harold Hill from The Music Man
- Henry Higgins from My Fair Lady
- Pseudolus from A Funny Thing Happened on the Way to the Forum

2 nominations

- Anatoly Sergievsky from Chess
- Billy Flynn from Chicago
- Bobby from Company
- Charley Wykeham from Where's Charley?
- Chuck Baxter from Promises, Promises
- Coalhouse Walker Jr. from Ragtime
- Curly McLain from Oklahoma!
- Don Quixote / Cervantes from Man of La Mancha
- Dr. Frank-N-Furter from The Rocky Horror Show
- Dr. Pangloss from Candide
- Emile de Becque from South Pacific
- Fagin from Oliver!
- Georg Nowack from She Loves Me
- George from La Cage aux Folles
- Georges from Sunday in the Park with George
- Guido Contini from Nine
- Horace Vandergelder from Hello, Dolly!
- J. Pierrepont Finch from How to Succeed in Business Without Really Trying
- Jean Valjean from Les Misérables
- Jerry/Daphne from Sugar and Some Like It Hot
- Joe Gillis from Sunset Boulevard
- Leo Frank from Parade
- Master of Ceremonies from Cabaret
- The King of Siam from The King and I
- Marvin from Falsettos
- Mr. Applegate from Damn Yankees
- Nathan Detroit from Guys and Dolls
- Amos Pinchley / Otto Schnitzler / Prince Cherney / Noble Junior from Little Me †
- Porgy from Porgy and Bess
- Tateh from Ragtime
- Tony from The Most Happy Fella

† – Most of the leading male characters in Little Me are played by the same actor, but the actual roles vary. In the original 1962 Broadway production and the 1998 revival, Sid Caesar and Martin Short (respectively) played Noble Eggleston, Amos Pinchley, Val du Val, Fred Poitrine, Otto Schnitzler, and Prince Cherney. Caesar also played Noble Junior. In the 1981 revival, the lead roles were split among James Coco and Victor Garber with Garber playing Noble Eggleston, Val du Val, Fred Poitrine, and Noble Junior.

== Productions with multiple nominations ==
boldface=winner

- Damn Yankees – **Ray Walston** and Stephen Douglass
- Take Me Along – **Jackie Gleason**, Robert Morse, and Walter Pidgeon
- Two Gentlemen of Verona – Clifton Davis and Raul Julia
- My Fair Lady – **George Rose** and Ian Richardson
- The Pirates of Penzance – **Kevin Kline** and George Rose
- La Cage aux Folles – **George Hearn** and Gene Barry
- Les Misérables – Terrence Mann and Colm Wilkinson
- Jerome Robbins' Broadway – **Jason Alexander** and Robert La Fosse (coincided with dual nominations for Starmites)
- Starmites – Gabriel Barre and Brian Lane Green (coincided with dual nominations for Jerome Robbins' Broadway)
- City of Angels – **James Naughton** and Gregg Edelman
- Show Boat – Mark Jacoby and John McMartin
- Ragtime – Peter Friedman and Brian Stokes Mitchell
- The Producers – **Nathan Lane** and Matthew Broderick
- Dirty Rotten Scoundrels – **Norbert Leo Butz** and John Lithgow (coincided with dual nominations for Monty Python's Spamalot)
- Monty Python's Spamalot – Hank Azaria and Tim Curry (coincided with dual nominations for Dirty Rotten Scoundrels)
- Billy Elliot the Musical – **David Alvarez**, **Trent Kowalik**, and **Kiril Kulish** (joint winners)
- La Cage aux Folles – **Douglas Hodge** and Kelsey Grammer (second time the show received dual nominations)
- The Book of Mormon – Josh Gad and Andrew Rannells
- Follies – Danny Burstein and Ron Raines
- Kinky Boots – **Billy Porter** and Stark Sands
- A Gentleman's Guide to Love and Murder – Jefferson Mays and Bryce Pinkham
- Hamilton – Lin-Manuel Miranda and **Leslie Odom Jr.**
- Some Like It Hot – Christian Borle and **J. Harrison Ghee**
- Ragtime – **Joshua Henry** and Brandon Uranowitz (second time the show received dual nominations)

== Multiple awards and nominations ==
Actors who have been nominated multiple times in any acting categories

Awards	Nominations	Recipient
4	7	Frank Langella
4	5	Boyd Gaines
3	7	Nathan Lane
3	7	John Lithgow
3	5	Mark Rylance
3	4	Kevin Kline
3	4	Zero Mostel
3	3	Hinton Battle
2	7	Christopher Plummer
2	6	Michael Cerveris
2	5	Christian Borle
2	5	George Hearn
2	5	George Rose
2	5	John Cullum
2	5	Robert Morse
2	4	James Earl Jones
2	4	Norbert Leo Butz
2	4	Richard Kiley
2	3	Al Pacino
2	3	David Burns
2	3	David Wayne
2	3	Fredric March
2	3	Judd Hirsch
2	3	Matthew Broderick
2	3	Phil Silvers
2	3	Rex Harrison
2	3	Robert Preston
2	3	Stephen Spinella
2	3	Walter Matthau
2	2	Alan Bates
2	2	Brian Dennehy
2	2	Bryan Cranston
2	2	Harvey Fierstein
2	2	Hiram Sherman
2	2	James Naughton
2	2	Jonathan Pryce
2	2	José Ferrer
2	2	Russell Nype
2	2	Tommy Tune
1	9	Danny Burstein
1	8	Jason Robards
1	7	Brian Bedford
1	6	Philip Bosco
1	5	Brandon Uranowitz
1	5	Brían F. O'Byrne
1	5	Hume Cronyn
1	5	Jim Dale
1	4	André De Shields
1	4	Billy Crudup
1	4	Brian Stokes Mitchell
1	4	Cyril Ritchard
1	4	David Alan Grier
1	4	Gregory Hines
1	4	Jack Cassidy
1	4	Joel Grey
1	4	Jonathan Groff
1	4	Joshua Henry
1	4	Liev Schreiber
1	4	René Auberjonois
1	4	Tony Shalhoub
1	3	Alfred Drake
1	3	Barry Bostwick
1	3	Courtney B. Vance
1	3	David Hyde Pierce
1	3	Gary Beach
1	3	Gavin Creel
1	3	George Grizzard
1	3	Jefferson Mays
1	3	Jerry Orbach
1	3	John Wood
1	3	Larry Blyden
1	3	Len Cariou
1	3	Mandy Patinkin
1	3	Michael Rupert
1	3	Richard Burton
1	3	Robert Sean Leonard
1	3	Roger Bart
1	3	Ruben Santiago-Hudson
1	3	Scott Wise
1	2	Alfred Lunt
1	2	Andrew Garfield
1	2	Barnard Hughes
1	2	Ben Vereen
1	2	Ben Platt
1	2	Bert Lahr
1	2	Bertie Carvel
1	2	Bill Irwin
1	2	Brent Carver
1	2	Charles Nelson Reilly
1	2	Chuck Cooper
1	2	Cleavant Derricks
1	2	Cliff Gorman
1	2	Daniel Radcliffe
1	2	Denzel Washington
1	2	Derek Jacobi
1	2	Eddie Redmayne
1	2	Edward Herrmann
1	2	Fritz Weaver
1	2	Gabriel Ebert
1	2	George S. Irving
1	2	Henry Fonda
1	2	Hugh Jackman
1	2	Ian McKellen
1	2	Jack Albertson
1	2	James Monroe Iglehart
1	2	Jeffrey Wright
1	2	John Benjamin Hickey
1	2	John Glover
1	2	Kevin Spacey
1	2	Laurence Fishburne
1	2	Leslie Odom Jr.
1	2	Martin Short
1	2	Michael Gough
1	2	Michael McGrath
1	2	Paul Rogers
1	2	Ralph Fiennes
1	2	Ray Bolger
1	2	Reed Birney
1	2	Roger Rees
1	2	Roger Robinson
1	2	Ron Holgate
1	2	Roy Dotrice
1	2	Santino Fontana
1	2	Sean Hayes
1	2	Simon Russell Beale
1	2	Sydney Chaplin
1	2	Zakes Mokae

Nominations	Recipient
5	Brian d'Arcy James
5	George C. Scott
5	John McMartin
5	Tom Aldredge
4	Donald Pleasence
4	Gregg Edelman
4	Raúl Esparza
4	Raul Julia
4	Victor Garber
3	Alan Alda
3	Alec McCowen
3	Alfred Molina
3	Andy Karl
3	Ben Gazzara
3	Brandon Victor Dixon
3	Brian Murray
3	Brooks Ashmanskas
3	Christopher Fitzgerald
3	Gilbert Price
3	Harry Groener
3	Jeff Daniels
3	Joseph Maher
3	Joshua Henry
3	Kevin Chamberlin
3	Marc Kudisch
3	Philip Seymour Hoffman
3	Ralph Richardson
3	Robin de Jesús
3	Terrence Mann
3	Tim Curry
3	Željko Ivanek
2	Adam Godley
2	Alan Rickman
2	Albert Finney
2	Alex Brightman
2	Andrew Rannells
2	Andy Griffith
2	Anthony Heald
2	Anthony Perkins
2	Arian Moayed
2	Biff McGuire
2	Bob Gunton
2	Bobby Cannavale
2	Brad Oscar
2	Bruce Adler
2	Bryce Pinkham
2	Charles Brown
2	Charles S. Dutton
2	Christopher Sieber
2	Christopher Walken
2	Clive Revill
2	Conleth Hill
2	Corey Hawkins
2	David Carroll
2	David Morse
2	David Pittu
2	David Threlfall
2	Dick Anthony Williams
2	Donald Moffat
2	Edward Petherbridge
2	Edward Winter
2	Gabriel Byrne
2	Gary Sinise
2	Gavin Lee
2	Herschel Bernardi
2	Howard McGillin
2	Jack Gilford
2	Jack Lemmon
2	Jeremy Jordan
2	Jeremy Pope
2	Joe Mantello
2	Joel Blum
2	John Gielgud
2	Jon Michael Hill
2	Josh Groban
2	Jude Law
2	K. Todd Freeman
2	Keith Carradine
2	Larry Bryggman
2	Larry Haines
2	Lewis J. Stadlen
2	Liam Neeson
2	Lin-Manuel Miranda
2	Mark Strong
2	Maurice Evans
2	Maurice Hines
2	Michael Stuhlbarg
2	Milo O'Shea
2	Nicol Williamson
2	Patrick Wilson
2	Peter Frechette
2	Richard Thomas
2	Rob McClure
2	Robert Prosky
2	Robert Weede
2	Samuel Barnett
2	Samuel E. Wright
2	Savion Glover
2	Stark Sands
2	Stephen McKinley Henderson
2	Theodore Bikel
2	Tom Courtenay
2	Tom Sturridge
2	Tom Wopat
2	Tony Roberts
2	Wilfrid Hyde-White

== Accomplishments ==
The lead role of Pseudolus in A Funny Thing Happened on the Way to the Forum has earned the Tony Award for the three different actors who have performed the character: Zero Mostel (1963), Phil Silvers (1972), and Nathan Lane (1996). In 1989, Jason Alexander won the award for portraying several characters in Jerome Robbins' Broadway, including Pseudolus.

Three other male roles have produced multiple Tony Award winners:

- J. Pierrepont Finch in How to Succeed in Business Without Really Trying: Robert Morse (1962) and Matthew Broderick (1995).
- Emile de Beque in South Pacific: Ezio Pinza (1950) and Paulo Szot (2008).
- Albin in La Cage Aux Folles: George Hearn (1984) and Douglas Hodge (2010). Gary Beach earned a nomination for the 2005 revival.

Two actors have won for their performances in My Fair Lady, each for a different character: Rex Harrison, playing Henry Higgins (1957) and George Rose, playing Alfred P. Doolitle (1976). Ian Richardson and Harry Hadden-Paton, who played Henry Higgins in 1976 and 2018, respectively, were also nominated.

The lead role with most nominations is Tevye, in Fiddler on the Roof. Five actors have been nominated for their portrayals, with one win: Zero Mostel (winner, 1965), Herschel Bernardi (1982), Chaim Topol (1991), Alfred Molina (2004), Danny Burstein (2016). In 1989, Jason Alexander won the award for portraying several characters in Jerome Robbins' Broadway, including Tevye.

Take Me Along is the only production to receive three nominations for the award: Jackie Gleason (winner), Robert Morse, and Walter Pidgeon.

The lead role of Sweeney Todd from Sweeney Todd: The Demon Barber of Fleet Street has received four nominations, though only Len Cariou, the role's originator, has won the award.

Portrayals of Cyrano de Bergerac have earned Tony wins both for Best Actor in a Play and Best Actor in a Musical: Jose Ferrer in Cyrano de Bergerac and Christopher Plummer in Cyrano.

Four roles in this category have also been classified in the category for Featured Actor in a Musical.

- Alfred P. Doolittle in My Fair Lady: George Rose won the 1976 Best Actor Award, whereas Stanley Holloway and Norbert Leo Butz were nominated in the Featured category for playing the part in 1956 and 2018, respectively.
- King of Siam in The King and I: both Lou Diamond Phillips and Ken Watanabe were nominated for Best Actor in 1996 and 2015, respectively, while Yul Brynner won the Best Featured Actor award originating the role in 1951.
- Master of Ceremonies in Cabaret: Alan Cumming won and Eddie Redmayne was nominated as Best Actor in 1998 and 2024, respectively, while Joel Grey won the Best Featured Actor award originating the role in 1966.
- Herr Schultz in Cabaret: Jack Gilford was nominated for Best Actor, while four subsequent actors earned nominations in the Featured category.

Harvey Fierstein was the first actor to win the award for portraying a female character, for his 2003 performance as Edna Turnblad in Hairspray. The role of The Leading Player in Pippin holds the distinction of winning in both Leading Actor and Leading Actress categories: originator Ben Vereen won in 1972, while Patina Miller won in the leading actress category for the 2013 revival. Neil Patrick Harris won in 2014 for his performance as Hedwig, a genderqueer woman in Hedwig and the Angry Inch.

While there have been no consecutive wins, five actors have managed to earn consecutive nominations: Gregory Hines (1980/1981), George Hearn (1983/1984), Patrick Wilson (2001/2002), Michael Cerveris (2006/2007), and Jonathan Groff (2024/2025).

In 2009, David Álvarez, Trent Kowalik, and Kiril Kulish were jointly nominated for the award for their performances in Billy Elliot the Musical as the titular character. They won the award, marking the first time three actors have received it.

The oldest performer to win this category is Bert Lahr, who was 68 when he won for Foxy in 1964. The youngest winner is Trent Kowalik, who won for Billy Elliot at age 14, sharing the award with David Álvarez and Kiril Kulish – both 15 at the time.

Darren Criss became the first Asian American actor to win this category for his performance as Oliver in Maybe Happy Ending in 2025.

== See also ==
- Best Actor
- Dorian Award for Outstanding Lead Performance in a Broadway Musical
- Drama Desk Award for Outstanding Actor in a Musical
- Drama Desk Award for Outstanding Lead Performance in a Musical
- Drama League Award for Distinguished Performance
- Laurence Olivier Award for Best Actor in a Musical
- Lists of acting awards
- Outer Critics Circle Award for Outstanding Lead Performer in a Broadway Musical
