= Stephen Douglass =

Background information
- Birth name: Stephen Fitch
- Born: September 27, 1921 Mt. Vernon, Ohio, U.S.
- Died: December 27, 2011 (aged 90)
- Genres: Musical theater
- Occupation(s): Actor, singer
- Years active: 1942–2003

Stephen Douglass (September 27, 1921 – December 20, 2011) was an American actor-singer.

Born Stephen Fitch in Mount Vernon, Ohio, Douglass had a distinguished theatrical career and appeared occasionally on television. He was the last performer to play Billy Bigelow in the original Broadway production of Carousel and he created the role in the West End production in London. He was nominated for the Tony Award for Best Actor for his performance as Joe Hardy in Damn Yankees, and he originated the role of Ulysses in Jerome Moross and John Latouche's The Golden Apple. Other Broadway appearances included Make A Wish, Destry Rides Again, 110 in the Shade, Rumple, and I Do! I Do!. He also portrayed Gaylord Ravenal in the 1966 Lincoln Center revival of Show Boat.

He retired to England in 1972, but continued working in musicals, most notably as Tevye in Fiddler on the Roof. His final musical appearance was in a U.K. production of Oklahoma! in 2003 at The New Vic Theatre in Newcastle-under-Lyme, Staffordshire.

In addition to his work in musical theatre, Douglass also occasionally sang roles in operas. In 1960, he portrayed Olin Blitch in the Philadelphia Lyric Opera Company's production of Carlisle Floyd's Susannah, with Phyllis Curtin in the title role and Richard Cassilly as Sam Polk. He appeared in several concerts for The Ivor Novello Appreciation Bureau at Littlewick Green.

Douglass married Edith Reis in 1942, with whom he had 4 children, living in Bogota, New Jersey until after her death in 1971. He later married Welsh singer Christine Yates. He died at the age of 90 after a long battle with leukemia.

== Selected Broadway credits ==
- Carousel (1949)
- Make a Wish (1951)
- The Golden Apple (1954)
- The Pajama Game (1954)
- Damn Yankees (1955)
- Rumple (1957)
- 110 in the Shade (1963)
- I Do! I Do! (1966)
