= The Ivor Novello Appreciation Bureau =

The Ivor Novello Appreciation Bureau is a voluntary organisation that was formed in Quedgeley, Gloucester, to foster interest in and preserve the memory of the Welsh composer and actor Ivor Novello.

== Ivor Day ==
An annual 'Ivor Day' event is held in the Berkshire village of Littlewick Green in June. A cast of performers gather in St. John's Church to perform recitals of prose and songs.

== Other events ==
A Thanksgiving Service was held on 6 March 2001, in the "Actors' Church," St Paul's, Covent Garden, London to mark the 50th anniversary of the passing of Ivor Novello. This was followed by a concert in the Salon of the Theatre Royal, Drury Lane.

A lilac tree was planted in the grounds of St. John's Church, Littlewick Green, on 10 June 2001.

== Officials ==
The Honorary Administrator is Nicholas Gaze who is assisted by Mary Falby and Chris Sansom.

The patrons are the sopranos Marilyn Hill Smith and Sandra Watkins.
