= Rumple (musical) =

- Sheet music
- Music: Ernest G. Schweikert
- Lyrics: Frank Reardon
- Book: Irving Phillips

Rumple is a comedy-musical with a book by Irving Phillips, music by Ernest G. Schweikert, and lyrics by Frank Reardon. The story, based on Phillips' 1955 play The Funnyman, concerns a comic strip creator and his character, Rumple, who resists the discontinuation of the strip.

It was produced on Broadway in 1957.

== Production ==
After a pre-Broadway tryout at the Shubert Theatre in Philadelphia starting October 21, 1957, Rumple premiered on Broadway at the Alvin Theatre on November 6, 1957, and closed on December 14, 1957, after 45 performances. It was produced by Paula Stone and Mike Sloan. It was directed by Jack Donohue with choreography by Bob Hamilton, settings and lighting by George Jenkins, costumes by Alvin Colt, and orchestrations by Ted Royal. Chester O'Brien was the stage manager. The cast starred Eddie Foy Jr., Gretchen Wyler, and Stephen Douglass, and included several actors in minor roles who later became famous, including Elliott Gould and Barbara Perry.

Phillips, a newspaper cartoonist, based the plot of the musical on his 1955 play, The Funnyman.

== Synopsis ==
Nelson Crandal, a cartoonist, has been traumatized by an accident and is unable to draw. He decides to discontinue his newspaper feature called Mr. Rumple, but the Rumple character comes to life and objects to being canceled and condemned to Oblivia (the land of forgotten cartoon characters). Rumple has 48 hours to persuade his creator to continue his existence and uses magical tricks on the humans. Anna is another character in the comic strip, Rumple's dumb-blonde girlfriend, who is trying to avoid Oblivia. The humans other than Nelson cannot see Rumple or Anna (so that when Nelson is talking to them, he appears insane), but the comic strip characters can see and hear the humans. Judy is Nelson's fiancé; Kate is a man-hunting gag writer who pens the stories for Crandal's strip. Dr. Winslow is an understanding psychiatrist. When Rumple is forced by the police to draw a picture of his girl for the missing-person investigation, the two comic strip characters are saved from Oblivia.

== Roles and original cast ==
- Rumple – Eddie Foy, Jr.
- Kate Drew – Gretchen Wyler
- Nelson Crandal – Stephen Douglass
- Judy Marlowe – Lois O'Brien
- Anna – Barbara Perry
- Dr. Wellington Winslow – Jerome Cowan
- Barney – Jackie Warner
- J. B. Conway – Milo Boulton
- Brannigan, Lt. Mallory, Voice of Oblivia – Ken Harvey
- Photographer, Weird One, He Who Gets Slapped – Elliott Gould
- Weird One, The Powder Room, Ensemble – Patricia White
- The Dissenter, Ensemble – George Martin

== Songs ==
Act I

- “It’s You for Me” – Nelson and Judy
- “In Times Like These” – Rumple and Anna
- “Red Letter Day” – Kate, Ensemble and Barney
- “The First Time I Spoke of You” – Nelson and Judy
- “Oblivia” – Rumple and Anna
- “Peculiar State of Affairs” – Rumple and Kate
- “How Do You Say Goodbye” – Judy
- “Gentlemen of the Press” – Nelson, Cartoon characters and Holiday girls

Act II

- “To Adjust Is a Must” – Dr. Winslow and Weird Ones
- “Coax Me” – Kate
- “All Dressed Up” – Kate and Ensemble
- “Wish” – Rumple
- “Finale” – Company

== Reception ==
Brooks Atkinson of The New York Times called it “an elaborately dull show that is strangled in plot, and not distinguished musically.” Another commentator wrote that the musical "was predominantly a mess ... in fact, the evening's only asset was that jaunty master of the soft shoe, the dead pan and the faraway smile, Eddie Foy."

== Sources ==
- Kronenberger, Louis (ed.) The Burns Mantle Yearbook: The Best Plays of 1957–1958, Dodd, Mead & Company: New York (1958)
