= 29th Tony Awards =

1975 US theatrical awards ceremony

- Date: April 20, 1975
- Location: Winter Garden Theatre, New York City, New York
- Hosted by: Larry Blyden, George S. Irving, Larry Kert, Carol Lawrence, Michele Lee, Bernadette Peters and Bobby Van
- Most wins: The Wiz (7)
- Most nominations: Mack and Mabel and The Wiz (8)

Television/radio coverage
- Network: ABC

The 29th Annual Tony Awards ceremony was held on April 20, 1975, at the Winter Garden Theatre in New York City, and broadcast by ABC television. Hosts/Performers/Presenters were Larry Blyden, George S. Irving, Larry Kert, Carol Lawrence, Michele Lee, Bernadette Peters and Bobby Van.

== Eligibility ==
Shows that opened on Broadway during the 1974–1975 season before March 23, 1975 are eligible.

Original plays

- Absurd Person Singular
- All Over Town
- An American Millionaire
- Black Picture Show
- Clarence Darrow
- Don't Call Back
- Dreyfus in Rehearsal
- Dunelawn
- Equus
- Fame
- God's Favorite
- The Hashish Club
- Hosanna
- In Praise of Love
- Jumpers
- Mert & Phil
- Mourning Pictures
- My Fat Friend
- My Sister, My Sister
- The National Health
- Ravenswood
- The Ritz
- Same Time, Next Year
- Saturday Sunday Monday
- Scapino
- Seascape
- Sizwe Banzi Is Dead and The Island
- Short Eyes
- Thieves
- Tubstrip
- Who's Who in Hell
- Will Rogers' USA

Original musicals

- Dance with Me
- Doctor Jazz
- Goodtime Charley
- A Letter for Queen Victoria
- The Lieutenant
- Mack and Mabel
- The Magic Show
- Man on the Moon
- The Night That Made America Famous
- Ride the Winds
- The Rocky Horror Show
- Shenandoah
- The Wiz
- Words & Music

Play revivals

- All God's Chillun Got Wings
- As You Like It
- Brief Lives
- Cat on a Hot Tin Roof
- The Dance of Death
- Duet
- A Doll's House
- Hughie
- London Assurance
- Love for Love
- Medea and Jason
- The Member of the Wedding
- The Misanthrope
- Of Mice and Men
- Private Lives
- The Rules of the Game
- Sherlock Holmes

Musical revivals

- Good News
- Gypsy
- Where's Charley?

== The ceremony ==
The theme centered on the Winter Garden Theatre, where many of the greatest stars in theatrical history began their careers.

Presenters: Jack Albertson, Eve Arden, Fred Astaire, Milton Berle, Ray Bolger, Carol Channing, Clifton Davis, Buddy Ebsen, Jack Haley, Angela Lansbury, Jack Lemmon, John V. Lindsay, Cleavon Little, Walter Matthau, Vincente Minnelli, Carl Reiner, Rosalind Russell, Joe Smith, Jean Stapleton.

Performers: Clive Baldwin, Joey Faye, Angela Lansbury, Alexis Smith.

Musicals represented:

- Mame ("Mame" - Angela Lansbury and Men)
- Follies ("The Story of Lucy and Jessie" - Alexis Smith and Dancers)
- Gypsy ("Everything's Coming up Roses" - Angela Lansbury and Company)

== Winners and nominees ==
Winners are in bold

Best Play	Best Musical
**Equus – Peter Shaffer**; Short Eyes – Miguel Pinero; Same Time, Next Year – Bernard Slade; Seascape – Edward Albee; Sizwe Banzi Is Dead and The Island – Athol Fugard, John Kani and Winston Ntshona; The National Health – Peter Nichols	**The Wiz**; Mack and Mabel; The Lieutenant; Shenandoah
Best Book of a Musical	Best Original Score (Music and/or Lyrics) Written for the Theatre
**James Lee Barrett, Peter Udell and Philip Rose – Shenandoah**; Michael Stewart – Mack and Mabel; Gene Curty, Nitra Scharfman and Chuck Strand – The Lieutenant; William F. Brown – The Wiz	**The Wiz – Charlie Smalls (music and lyrics)**; A Letter for Queen Victoria – Alan Lloyd (music and lyrics); Shenandoah – Gary Geld (music) and Peter Udell (lyrics); The Lieutenant – Gene Curty, Nitra Scharfman and Chuck Strand (music and lyrics)
Best Performance by a Leading Actor in a Play	Best Performance by a Leading Actress in a Play
**John Kani and Winston Ntshona – Sizwe Banzi Is Dead and The Island as Various Characters**; Jim Dale – Scapino as Scapino; Peter Firth – Equus as Alan Strang; Henry Fonda – Clarence Darrow as Clarence Darrow; Ben Gazzara – Hughie and Duet as "Erie" Smith; John Wood – Sherlock Holmes as Sherlock Holmes	**Ellen Burstyn – Same Time, Next Year as Doris**; Elizabeth Ashley – Cat on a Hot Tin Roof as Maggie Pollitt; Diana Rigg – The Misanthrope as Celimene; Maggie Smith – Private Lives as Amanda Prynne; Liv Ullmann – A Doll's House as Nora Helmer
Best Performance by a Leading Actor in a Musical	Best Performance by a Leading Actress in a Musical
**John Cullum – Shenandoah as Charlie Anderson**; Joel Grey – Goodtime Charley as Charley; Raúl Juliá – Where's Charley? as Charley Wykeham; Eddie Mekka – The Lieutenant as Lieutenant; Robert Preston – Mack and Mabel as Mack Sennett	**Angela Lansbury – Gypsy as Mama Rose**; Lola Falana – Doctor Jazz as Edna Mae Sheridan; Bernadette Peters – Mack and Mabel as Mabel Normand; Ann Reinking – Goodtime Charley as Joan of Arc
Best Performance by a Supporting or Featured Actor in a Play	Best Performance by a Supporting or Featured Actress in a Play
**Frank Langella – Seascape as Leslie**; Larry Blyden – Absurd Person Singular as Sidney; Leonard Frey – The National Health as Barnet; Philip Locke – Sherlock Holmes as Professor Moriarty; George Rose – My Fat Friend as Henry; Dick Anthony Williams – Black Picture Show as Alexander	**Rita Moreno – The Ritz as Googie Gomez**; Linda Miller – Black Picture Show as Jane; Geraldine Page – Absurd Person Singular as Marion; Carole Shelley – Absurd Person Singular as Jane; Elizabeth Spriggs – London Assurance as Lady Gay Spanker; Frances Sternhagen – Equus as Dora Strang
Best Performance by a Supporting or Featured Actor in a Musical	Best Performance by a Supporting or Featured Actress in a Musical
**Ted Ross – The Wiz as The Cowardly Lion**; Tom Aldredge – Where's Charley? as Mr. Spettigue; John Bottoms – Dance with Me as Jimmy Dick II; Doug Henning – The Magic Show as Doug; Gilbert Price – The Night That Made America Famous as Performer; Richard B. Shull – Goodtime Charley as Minguet	**Dee Dee Bridgewater – The Wiz as Glinda**; Susan Browning – Goodtime Charley as Agnès Sorel; Zan Charisse – Gypsy as Louise; Taina Elg – Where's Charley? as Donna Lucia D'Alvadorez; Kelly Garrett – The Night That Made America Famous as Various Characters; Donna Theodore – Shenandoah as Ann Anderson
Best Direction of a Play	Best Direction of a Musical
**John Dexter – Equus**; Arvin Brown – The National Health; Frank Dunlop – Scapino; Ronald Eyre – London Assurance; Athol Fugard – Sizwe Banzi Is Dead and The Island; Gene Saks – Same Time, Next Year	**Geoffrey Holder – The Wiz**; Gower Champion – Mack and Mabel; Grover Dale – The Magic Show; Arthur Laurents – Gypsy
Best Choreography	Best Scenic Design
**George Faison – The Wiz**; Gower Champion – Mack and Mabel; Donald McKayle – Doctor Jazz; Margo Sappington – Where's Charley?; Robert Tucker – Shenandoah; Joel Zwick – Dance with Me	**Carl Toms – Sherlock Holmes**; Scott Johnson – Dance with Me; Tanya Moiseiwitsch – The Misanthrope; William Ritman – God's Favorite; Rouben Ter-Arutunian – Goodtime Charley; Robin Wagner – Mack and Mabel
Best Costume Design	Best Lighting Design
**Geoffrey Holder – The Wiz**; Arthur Boccia – Where's Charley?; Raoul Pene Du Bois – Doctor Jazz; Willa Kim – Goodtime Charley; Tanya Moiseiwitsch – The Misanthrope; Patricia Zipprodt – Mack and Mabel	**Neil Peter Jampolis – Sherlock Holmes**; Chip Monk – The Rocky Horror Show; Abe Feder – Goodtime Charley; Andy Phillips – Equus; Thomas Skelton – All God's Chillun Got Wings; James Tilton – Seascape

== Special awards ==
- Neil Simon, for his plays

=== Special Award ===
- Al Hirschfeld for 50 years of theatrical cartoons

=== Multiple nominations and awards ===
These productions had multiple nominations:

- 8 nominations: Mack and Mabel and The Wiz
- 7 nominations: Goodtime Charley
- 6 nominations: Shenandoah
- 5 nominations: Equus and Where's Charley?
- 4 nominations: The Lieutenant and Sherlock Holmes
- 3 nominations: Absurd Person Singular, Dance with Me, Doctor Jazz, Gypsy, The Island, The Misanthrope, The National Health, Same Time, Next Year, Seascape and Sizwe Banzi Is Dead
- 2 nominations: Black Picture Show, London Assurance, The Magic Show, The Night That Made America Famous and Scapino

The following productions received multiple awards.

- 7 wins: The Wiz
- 2 wins: Equus, Shenandoah and Sherlock Holmes

== See also ==
- 47th Academy Awards
