= Alan Lloyd (composer) =

American composer

- Born: Alan Huber Lloyd; 10 January 1943; Baltimore, Maryland, USA
- Died: March 31, 1986; New York City, USA
- Occupation: Composer

Alan Huber Lloyd (10 January 1943 – 31 March 1986) was an American composer, primarily known for his scores for the theatrical works of Robert Wilson and the ballets of Andy de Groat. His score for Wilson's A Letter for Queen Victoria was nominated for Best Original Score at the 29th Tony Awards. He also composed works for solo piano and for chamber ensembles in a conservative tonal style.

== Life and career ==
Lloyd was born in Baltimore, Maryland, the son of Mary née Grant and Allen Huber Lloyd. His father was a mechanical engineer who founded the toy company Multifold Inc. in Milford, Ohio. Lloyd received his BA in Music from Antioch College where he studied under the composer Donald Keats.

According to Laurence Shyer in Robert Wilson and his collaborators, Lloyd was the first of several composers with whom Robert Wilson would work. Their collaboration began when Lloyd composed the incidental music for Wilson's 1969 production of The King of Spain. Lloyd also played the title role and constructed the gigantic pair of cat's legs which hung from the proscenium throughout the play. Lloyd went on to compose incidental piano music for several more early works by Wilson, sometimes performing it himself on stage during the play.

A Letter for Queen Victoria, which premiered in 1974 at the Festival dei Due Mondi, marked the first time that Lloyd composed a full-length score for one Wilson's works. Written for a string quartet and solo flute, it was nominated for Best Original Score at the 29th Tony Awards. Lloyd's second full-length score for Wilson was Death, Destruction and Detroit, which premiered in Berlin in February 1979. It was to have received its US premiere at the Metropolitan Opera in New York later that year. However, the project fell through, partly because of the production's estimated cost of $1 million and partly because the Met had doubts about the sufficiency of Lloyd's score for a fully operatic production.

In addition to his work for Wilson, Lloyd composed ballet music for Andy de Groat and a number of pieces for solo piano and chamber ensemble (mostly string quartets), which he presented in a 1977 concert at The Kitchen in New York City. In his review of the concert, John Rockwell described Lloyd's music as composed in a conservative tonal style but compared him unfavorably to George Rochberg, another contemporary composer who used tonality and past musical styles in his works. Rockwell considered Lloyd's pieces "naive in the worst sense, technically, conceptually and emotionally."

Lloyd died in 1986 at the age of 43 survived by his parents and two sisters. His elder sister Phoebe Lloyd (1940–2005) was an art historian who specialised in the life and work of Raphaelle Peale. A portrait of Lloyd taken by his friend Peter Hujar in 1975 appears in Hujar's book Portraits in Life and Death and was exhibited in major retrospectives of Hujar's works in 1994 and 2017. Like Hujar, Lloyd died of AIDS. In 1987 his work, along with that of four other musicians who had died of AIDS (David Reichenberg, Calvin Hampton, David Summers, (Note: David Paul Summers (1952–1986) was a Texas-born singer, actor, and AIDS activist. He made his New York debut in 1973 in Al Carmines's musical The Faggot and was a co-founder of the New York People With AIDS Coalition.) and Paul Jacobs), was featured on a program in the WNYC radio series New, Old, and Unexpected.

== Music for Robert Wilson's works ==
Alan Lloyd composed all or part of the music for the following works:

- The King of Spain (1969)
- The Life and Times of Sigmund Freud (1969)
- Deafman Glance (1970)
- Handbill (1970)
- Watermill (1971)
- KA MOUNTAIN AND GUARDenia TERRACE: a story about a family and some people changing (1972)
- The Life and Times of Joseph Stalin (1973)
- A Letter for Queen Victoria (1974)
- I Was Sitting on My Patio This Guy Appeared I Thought I Was Hallucinating (1977)
- Video 50 (1978)
- Death, Destruction and Detroit (1979)
