= A Letter for Queen Victoria =

- Opera by Alan Lloyd and Michael Galasso
- Librettist: Robert Wilson; Christopher Knowles, Cynthia Lubar, Stefan Brecht, James Neu (additional text)
- Premiere: 15 June 1974; Teatro Caio Melisso, Spoleto, Italy

A Letter for Queen Victoria is a theatrical work written and directed by Robert Wilson with music by Alan Lloyd. Wilson called it "an opera in four acts". Others, such as critic Clive Barnes and literary scholar Charles Bernstein, have called it a play, while admitting that its genre was virtually impossible to define. It premiered at the Festival dei Due Mondi in Spoleto, Italy on 15 June 1974.

== Background and performance history ==
A Letter for Queen Victoria work marked Wilson's first use of language in his theatrical pieces, which previously had all involved the actors and dancers moving silently. An example of these was his 1970 Deafman Glance, inspired and acted by Raymond Andrews, a 12-year-old black deaf-mute boy. In 1972 Wilson staged The Life And Times Of Joseph Stalin a 12-hour compilation of all of his "silent operas." A Letter for Queen Victoria, his next project was inspired and acted by another of his child muses, Christopher Knowles, a 14-year-old autistic boy whose poetry Wilson had discovered in early 1973.

After its premiere at the Festival dei Due Mondi in June 1974, it was performed later that year in La Rochelle and Paris. It also played a short season on Broadway at the ANTA Theatre in March–April 1975. For its Broadway production, Alan Lloyd was nominated for Best Original Score at the 29th Tony Awards.
