= Black Picture Show =

1975 play

Black Picture Show is a play written by Bill Gunn at the height of the Black Arts Movement, in 1975. Clive Barnes of The New York Times described it as having "brilliant writing". The play deals with the conversations between an aging, mentally ill Black screenwriter, playwright, and poet and his son, also an artist. It was also published as a book.

== Plot ==
Alexander, the father, is trying to create artwork that is both politically and artistically meaningful, while also being commercially successful. His son, J.D., is focused on making bold, unconventional art.

The clash between the father and son's approaches drives the story of Black Picture Show. The play has a poetic, absurdist style and uses techniques from film, turning a family drama into an avant-garde theatrical piece. The way Gunn's play is structured also explores the challenge Black artists face in deciding whether to make experimental or more mainstream work.

== Productions ==
Black Picture Show was originally performed at the Vivian Beaumont Theater as part of the New York Shakespeare Festival. The show was produced by Joseph Papp and featured music and lyrics by Sam Waymon. It ran from January 6 to February 9, 1975, with 21 previews and 41 performances.

In June 2021, a staged reading of Black Picture Show was performed, directed by Awoye Timpo, in conjunction with a gallery exhibition and program series dedicated to the work of Bill Gunn at the Artists Space gallery. The performance was later made into a publicly available recording.

== Awards and honors ==
The original 1975 production received two nominations at the 29th Tony Awards: Best Featured Actor In A Play for Dick Anthony Williams (also nominated for the Drama Desk Award) and Best Featured Actress In A Play for Linda Miller.
