= Scapino (play) =

Playbill advertising Jim Dale in Scapino at the Ambassador Theatre in New York (November 1975)

Scapino, also written Scapino!, is a 1974 play adapted by Jim Dale and Frank Dunlop from Les Fourberies de Scapin by Molière, which opened at the Brooklyn Academy of Music in New York. A production by the Young Vic, it starred Jim Dale, Denise Coffey and Ian Trigger and was directed by Frank Dunlop. The production later moved to the Circle in the Square Theater and then the Ambassador Theatre in New York.

In this adaptation Molière's French play is transposed to modern Naples in a British pantomime-style. Here the deceitful valet Scapino contrives to bring his master's children of two sons and two daughters and their various loves together through all kinds of trickery - despite his master's own plans for them. The music was by Jim Dale.

In 1974 Frank Dunlop was nominated for the Drama Desk Award for Outstanding Director; Dale won the Outer Critics Circle Award and the Drama Desk Award in 1974, while in 1975 Dale was nominated for Best Actor and Dunlop for Best Director at the 29th Tony Awards.

== Cast ==
(The first names appeared in the original production at the Brooklyn Academy of Music in New York. The second set are the cast after the show moved to the Ambassador Theatre in New York.

- Scapino (servant of Geronte) - Jim Dale
- Headwaiter - Barry Michlin
- Waiters - Hugh Hastings and Alan Coates/George Connolly and Norman Abrams
- Waitress - Jenny Austen/Holly Villaire
- Argante - Ian Trigger
- Giacinta - Mel Martin/Connie Fursland
- Carlo - Andrew Robertson/John Horn
- Ottavio (son of Argant) - Ian Charleson/Christopher Hastings
- Sylvestro (servant of Argante, friend of Scapino) - Gavin Reed
- Geronte - Paul Brooke/J. Frank Lucas
- Leandro (son of Geronte) - Phil Killian
- Zerbinetta (a gypsy, beloved of Leandro) - Denise Coffey/Hattie Winston
- Nurse - Lotti Taylor/Bertha Sklar
