= Bettina WitteVeen =

German conceptual artist and photographer

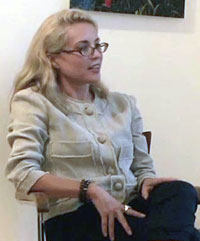
- WitteVeen in 2018
- Born: January 12, 1958 (age 68); Mannheim, Germany
- Known for: conceptual artist, photographer, self-taught
- Spouse: Raoul WitteVeen
- Website: www.bettinawitteveen.com

Bettina WitteVeen (born 1958) is a German-born conceptual artist, photographer and filmmaker. She fuses photography, film, archival images and sculpture to create large-scale installations that are mounted at historical war-related sites around the world.

== Early life and education ==
WitteVeen was born Bettina Sophie Beythan in Mannheim, Germany, on Jan. 12, 1958. She grew up with parents who lived through the bombings of Mannheim by Allied forces during World War II and relayed those traumatic experiences to her.

Their recollections of the tragedy of war shaped both her and her art. She left Europe after graduating from high school and traveled to what she considered her "dream destination": the United States with its music and its freedom movements. "I was totally impressed by Martin Luther King," she said. "I was fascinated by the North American Indians. New York struck me as the pinnacle of the world. But I just had this feeling, the spirit that emanated from America at the time, this feeling of liberality and freedom, being able to be yourself."

WitteVeen completed her Bachelor of Arts degree in American studies and history at Wellesley College in Massachusetts in 1980 and studied law at LMU Munich in Munich, Germany. She worked as a banker at a financial company before turning to art. She is a self-taught artist and photographer.

== Basis for her art ==
A practicing Hindu-Buddhist, WitteVeen uses her pacifist philosophy to create exhibitions that she describes as "a fine line between shock and compassion." She does extensive research around the globe, spending years photographing subjects and combing archives for historical photos.

WitteVeen creates what she calls "visual poems," large-scale artistic installations using color and black and white photos, sound, video and constructed sculptures. She has become known for multi-dimensional installations in war-torn sites that capture "the soul of a place," as one critic stated. In most cases, her works were among the first installed in such unorthodox exhibit spaces.

"We are not hard-wired for war," said WitteVeen. "Warfare is a tragic aberration of the neurotic aspects of a society. ... Like the abolitionists of slavery who published painful images to show the inhumanity of slavery and to rally support, I show the reality and ravages of war."

She has traveled to former prison camps, battlefields, military installations, concentration camps, re-education camps, internment sites and memorials in Africa, the Americas, Europe and Asia. For her photography and installations, she chooses locations scarred by violence, destruction and war - the predominant theme in her works. She also records the cultures of people in remote villages in various corners of the world.

WitteVeen uses both fresh images that she captures with her analog Hasselbad CM 500 camera and historical images. She retouches the archival photos so extensively that they end up as new images. One reviewer noted the effect of her revised images in her 2015 installation at the shuttered Brooklyn (NY) Navy Yard Hospital: She "has retouched the archival images to soften specifics, choosing ambiguity over shock and awe to engage rather than enrage, an epic of redemption rather than just another anti-war editorial."

== "The Heart of Darkness" series ==
Her most ambitious project was titled "The Heart of Darkness," five installations showing war's impact on society and its people. The installations were set up in Germany, France and the United States. The title was inspired by Joseph Conrad's novella "Heart of Darkness," which is considered a criticism of European imperialism in Africa. One article saw the series as a "global anti-war project."2005: "Dulce et Decorum Est Pro Patria Mori"

WitteVeen's first installation in the series was mounted at the Maison de Saint-Louis in Lectoure, France, as part of a group show sponsored by L'ete photographique de Lectoure. She hung color and black and white photographs from windows in a building that housed refugees during World War I.

2006: "Brüder, Zur Sonne, Zur Freiheit ... and the beat goes on"

This piece consisted of 22 photos exemplifying the idealism of youth, shown at the Goethe-Institut in New York. It was inspired by Johann Wolfgang von Goethe's years as a young follower of the "Sturm und Drang" movement.

2008: "Death and the Maiden"

This installation examined forced labor and the role of women in wars. It was mounted in a former brewery in Berlin where slave laborers from Ukraine installed rocket parts for the Germans and where Germans fled during air raids in World War II. The installation consisted of more than 100 photographs.

2015: "When We Were Soldiers ... once and young"

The fourth installation was assembled at the Brooklyn Navy Yard Hospital in New York. The hospital had been used to treat soldiers starting from the Civil War to the end of World War II. The installation is based on the 1992 book about the Vietnam War titled "We Were Soldiers Once... and Young"

WitteVeen spent five years persuading the owners to allow her to use the space. The installation pulled together more than 100 black and white and color archived photographs, constructed sculptures in the shape of large crosses and a walk-in altar with sound. The piece received rave reviews from critics and the press, with one critic describing it as "brave and brilliant."

2018: "11.11.18 Twilight" or "Dämmerung"

This final piece of the series was installed at the Chapel of the Kaiser Wilhelm Memorial Church in Berlin. The chapel is next to the ruins of the old church tower destroyed in a World War II bombing and now stands as a war memorial. The piece commemorated the end of World War I in 1918. The installation consisted of WitteVeen's photographs, sound, and reworked archival recordings that were combined into collages, sculptures and a video presentation.

== Films ==
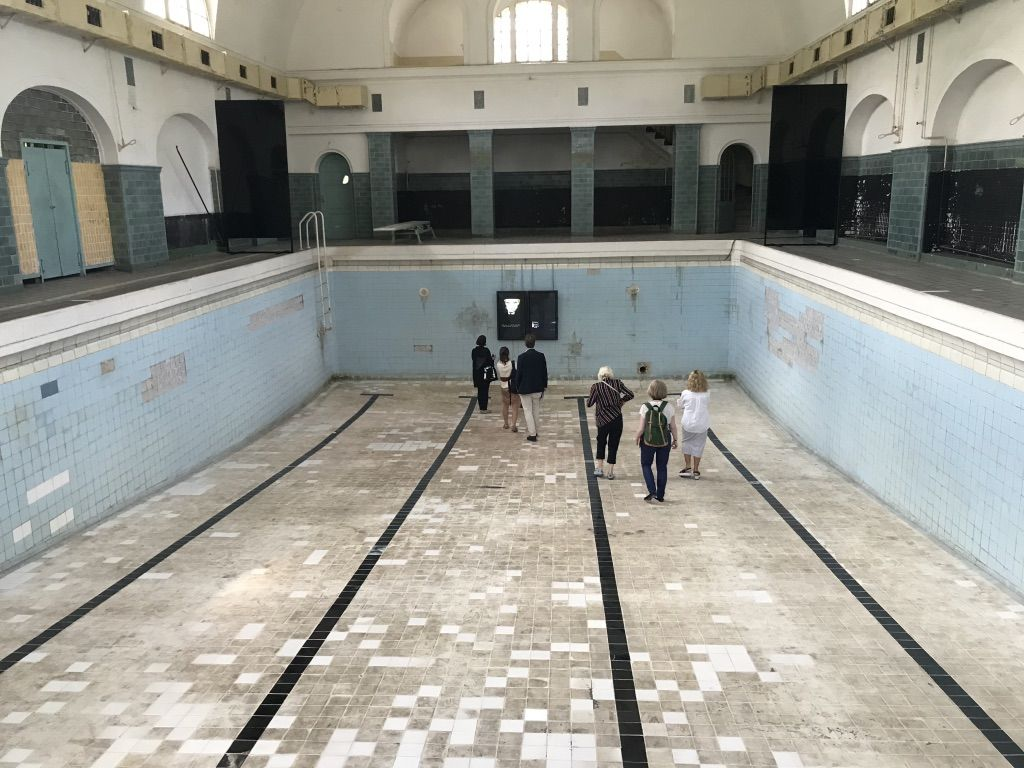
From the installation "Götterfunken feuertrunken der Erlkönig: whiteout" in Wünsdorf, Germany, 2018.

In 2018, WitteVeen focused her work on the issues of science, technology and artificial intelligence. She used film, photography and sculpture to produce "Götterfunken feuertrunken der Erlkönig: whiteout." The installation was set up in Wünsdorf, Germany, a former Soviet military base south of Berlin.

The project consisted of the film "Götterfunken," consisting of dance sequences recorded by WitteVeen and installed in a former theater. Nuclear physicist J. Robert Oppenheimer of the Manhattan Project was projected on a screen in the film "Feuertrunken the Erlking," which was installed in an empty indoor swimming pool in a former sports complex. She also set up the installation "Whiteout" inside the complex, with photos of biological and chemical warfare, and Big Brother-style software. Outside, WitteVeen surrounded the statue of Lenin with black asphalt and barbed wire.

"Götterfunken" was presented in the exhibit "Songs Without Words: The Art of Music" at the Nassau County Museum of Art in Roslyn, NY, in 2021.

== Other works and exhibitions ==
In 1999, in a group exhibit, she offered a series of studio photographs for a multidimensional exhibit titled "Body Art: Marks of Identity" at the American Museum of Natural History in New York. Hers was a wall of black and white portraits of young white men and women she photographed in New York and San Francisco in the mid-1990s who adopted the scarification practice of the Aboriginal people. In one photo, a man named Jon was singled out by one reviewer for his elongated pierced ears, eyebrow rings, extensive tattoos and a cylinder through his nose. The photos were among a series she titled "Hybrid Identities."

"Sacred Sister" was her second photography project, which she began in 1995 by photographing women in the jungles of Indonesia and Southeast Asia. It consisted of 100 images. The photographs were shown in an exhibition at Art Basel Miami Beach in December 2003. The exhibition space, designed by theater director Robert Wilson, was composed of layers of autumn leaves on the floor of a studio. In 2016, WitteVeen was among 22 artists whose works were shown in the "Christa Project: Manifesting Divine Bodies" at Cathedral Church of St. John the Divine in New York. The exhibition examined the historical concept of Christ and how the divine can be found in all people. She submitted an installation titled "5 Wounds." It consisted of photo sculptures of five women activists: Sophie Scholl, Viola Liuzzo, Anna Mae Aquash, Rosa Luxemburg and Petra Kelly.

In 2020, WitteVeen participated in the "Blue" exhibit at the Nassau County Museum of Art in Roslyn, NY. The exhibit focused on the color blue, and she presented the polyptych "Blue Buddha" and a photograph from Burma (officially named Myanmar). The exhibit included works by both veteran and contemporary artists, including Henri Matisse, Paul Klee, Helen Frankenthaler, Pablo Picasso, Joan Miro, Odilon Redon, Roy Lichtenstein, Yves Klein, Antonio Santin, David Hockney, Jeffrey Gibson and Hiroshige.

In 2022, her photograph "Vieques, Puerto Rico, US Navy Amphibious Training Range" was represented in "The Big Picture: Photography's Moment" at the Nassau County Museum of Art. Works in the exhibit spanned a century of photographic history, from the era of Ansel Adams to major contemporary artists. They included a diverse group of artists and subjects from around the globe, including Adams, Alfred Stieglitz, Berenice Abbott, Man Ray, Lewis Hine, Dorothea Lange, Walker Evans, Edward Weston, Ahmet Ertuğ, Candida Höfer, Bernd and Hilla Becher, Yongliang Yang, Sarah Charlesworth, Lalla Essaydi and Christian Boltanski.

In 2024 Bettina WitteVeen’s film "Götterfunken" (Sparks of the Deity) was shown in the exhibition "Dance Worlds" at the Bundeskunsthalle in Bonn, Germany. The exhibition presented dance as a global form of representation and expression, showing multi-perspective interweaving stories, and illuminating dance as an essential part of our existence. The poetic film interweaves ritual dance sequences, which the artist recorded on location over the course of a decade on her travels in Indonesia, Cambodia, Bhutan, Sri Lanka, Cuba and on a Lakota reservation in the United States of America, with abstract film images.

== Photography books and lecture ==
"Hybrid Identities" was her first photography project. Her portrait of Jon was included in the book "Photography: A Cultural History" by Mary Warner Marien, published in 2002. WitteVeen's photograph "Krissy (1998)" from this series is in the collection of the Whitney Museum of American Art.

In August 2003, WitteVeen produced a monograph of "Sacred Sister" that included the installation design by Robert Wilson (shown at Art Basel Miami Beach later that year) and an essay by art historian Charles A. Riley II.

WitteVeen lectured on photography online at the 11th Borobudur Writers and Cultural Festival in 2022.

== Art donation and philanthropic work ==
In its 2005 annual report, the Rakow Research Library Collection at the Corning Museum of Glass in Corning, NY, listed WitteVeen as a donor. She contributed the triptych "Tara in Cambodia" to a charity art auction for Terres des Femmes, a women's rights organization in Berlin, in 2019.

While traveling in Cambodia, she came upon an orphanage in financial trouble. She and her husband Raoul helped the orphanage through the crisis and remained connected to it.

== Selected exhibitions ==
- Art Basel Miami Beach, 2003
- Lectoure Center for Art and Photography, France, 2005
- Art Miami, 2006
- Nassau County Museum of Art, 2021

== Selected collections ==
- Whitney Museum of American Art
