= Teatro Caio Melisso =

Opera house located in Spoleto, Italy

Coordinates: 42°44′06″N 12°44′22″E

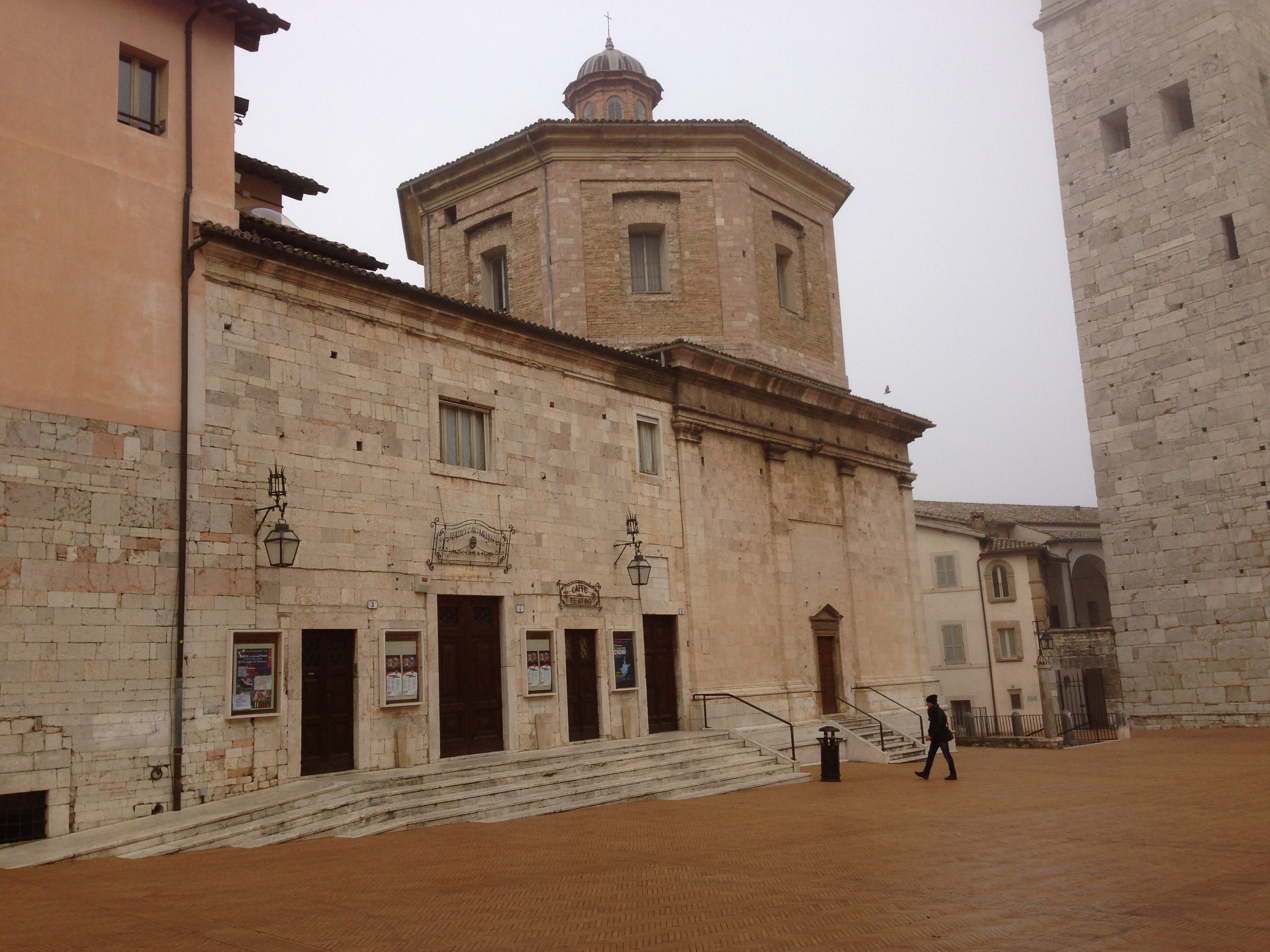
An image of Teatro Caio Melisso

The Teatro Caio Melisso is an opera house located in Spoleto, Italy and it serves as the main venue for opera performances during the annual summer Festival dei Due Mondi.

The theatre has undergone several transformations and name changes since the late 17th century. The Teatro di Piazza del Duomo, also known as the Teatro della Rosa, built around 1667 was modernized in 1749 and re-opened in 1749 as the Nuovo Teatro di Spoleto. After an 1817 restoration and after Rossini had visited the theatre, it gradually fell into disuse and a new theatre was needed by the mid-19th century. The 800-seat Teatro Nuovo was built between 1854 and 1864 at considerable public expense.

However, and in spite of the Nuovo, the old theatre was preserved and renovated once more with a new design and layout. Now renamed the Teatro Caio Melisso after a Spoletan writer, it re-opened in 1880 as a 350-seat, 3 levels of boxes plus a gallery opera house.

The fact that two opera theatres existed brought Gian-Carlo Menotti, the Festival's founder and director, to the town since Menotti felt that Spoleto offered many attractions. The first festival was held in 1958. The Festival's inaugural presentation on 5 June 1958 was Verdi's Macbeth, but other less known and neglected operas characterized early Festivals. In addition to Menotti's own operas, most seasons reflect a broad range of periods and styles.
