= Dance with Me (musical) =

Dance With Me
- Original Broadway Playbill
- Music: Greg Antonacci
- Lyrics: Greg Antonacci
- Book: Greg Antonacci
- Productions: 1975 Broadway

Dance With Me is a musical written by Greg Antonacci. It opened on Broadway on January 23, 1975, and ran at the Mayfair Theatre for 396 performances. The musical was directed and choreographed by Joel Zwick.

The musical is set in present day at a New York City subway station. While waiting on the platform, Honey Boy daydreams about life, dating, baseball, and rock and roll in the 1950s.

Dance With Me was a renamed, restaged version of Dance Wi’ Me, a production by the same team which opened at the Public Theater in June 1971. It also appeared at La MaMa Experimental Theatre Club in the early 1970s. The show received three 1975 Tony Award nominations and two 1975 Drama Desk Award nominations.

The original Broadway cast included Annie Abbott as Tommie Sincere, Antonacci as Honey Boy (Peter Riegert later took over this role), and John Bottoms as Jimmy Dick. Deborah Rush played Goldie Pot, and director Joel Zwick appeared as Bulldog Allen.

== Award nominations ==
Dance With Me was nominated for the following awards:

- 1975 Tony Award for Best Performance by a Featured Actor in a Musical (John Bottoms)
- 1975 Tony Award for Best Scenic Design (Scott Johnson)
- 1975 Tony Award for Best Choreography (Joel Zwick)
- 1975 Drama Desk Award for Outstanding Director of a Musical (Zwick)
- 1975 Drama Desk Award for Outstanding Set Design (Johnson)
