= Robert Wilson (director) =

American stage director and playwright (1941–2025)

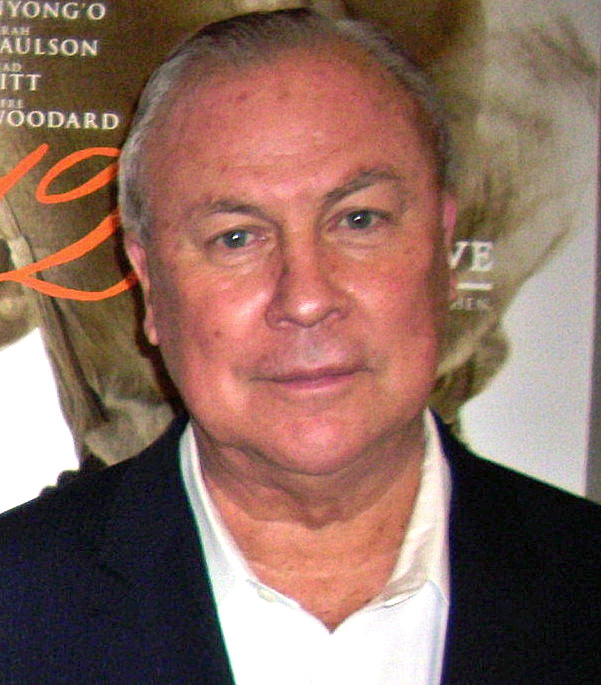
- Wilson in 2014
- Born: October 4, 1941; Waco, Texas, U.S.
- Died: July 31, 2025 (aged 83); Water Mill, New York, U.S.
- Education: Pratt Institute (BFA)
- Occupations: Theater director; artist
- Years active: 1960s–2025
- Website: robertwilson.com

Robert Wilson (October 4, 1941 – July 31, 2025) was an American director and playwright of experimental theater. He also worked as a choreographer, performer, painter, sculptor, video artist, and sound and lighting designer. He is best known for his collaboration with Philip Glass and Lucinda Childs on Einstein on the Beach, and his frequent collaborations with Tom Waits. In 1991, Wilson established The Watermill Center, "a laboratory for performance" on the East End of Long Island, New York, regularly working with opera and theater companies, as well as cultural festivals.

== Early life and education ==
Robert Wilson was born October 4, 1941, in Waco, Texas, the son of Loree Velma (née Hamilton) and D.M. Wilson, a lawyer. He had a difficult youth as the gay son of a conservative family. "When I was growing up, it was a sin to go to the theater. It was a sin if a woman wore pants. There was a prayer box in school, and if you saw someone sinning you could put their name in the prayer box, and on Fridays everyone would pray for those people whose names were in the prayer box." He was stuttering and taken to a local dance instructor called Bird "Baby" Hoffman, who helped him overcome his stutter. After attending local schools, he studied business administration at the University of Texas from 1959 to 1962.

He moved to Brooklyn, New York, in 1963 to change fields, study art and architecture. At some point he went to Arizona to study architecture with Paolo Soleri at his desert complex. Wilson found himself drawn to the work of pioneering choreographers George Balanchine, Merce Cunningham, and Martha Graham, among others. He engaged in therapeutic theater work with brain-injured and disabled children in New York. He received a BFA in architecture from the Pratt Institute in 1965. He directed a "ballet for iron-lung patients where the participants moved a fluorescent streamer with their mouths while the janitor danced dressed as Miss America". During this period, he also attended lectures by Sibyl Moholy-Nagy (widow of László Moholy-Nagy), and studied painting with artist George McNeil.

== Career ==
=== Theater and film ===
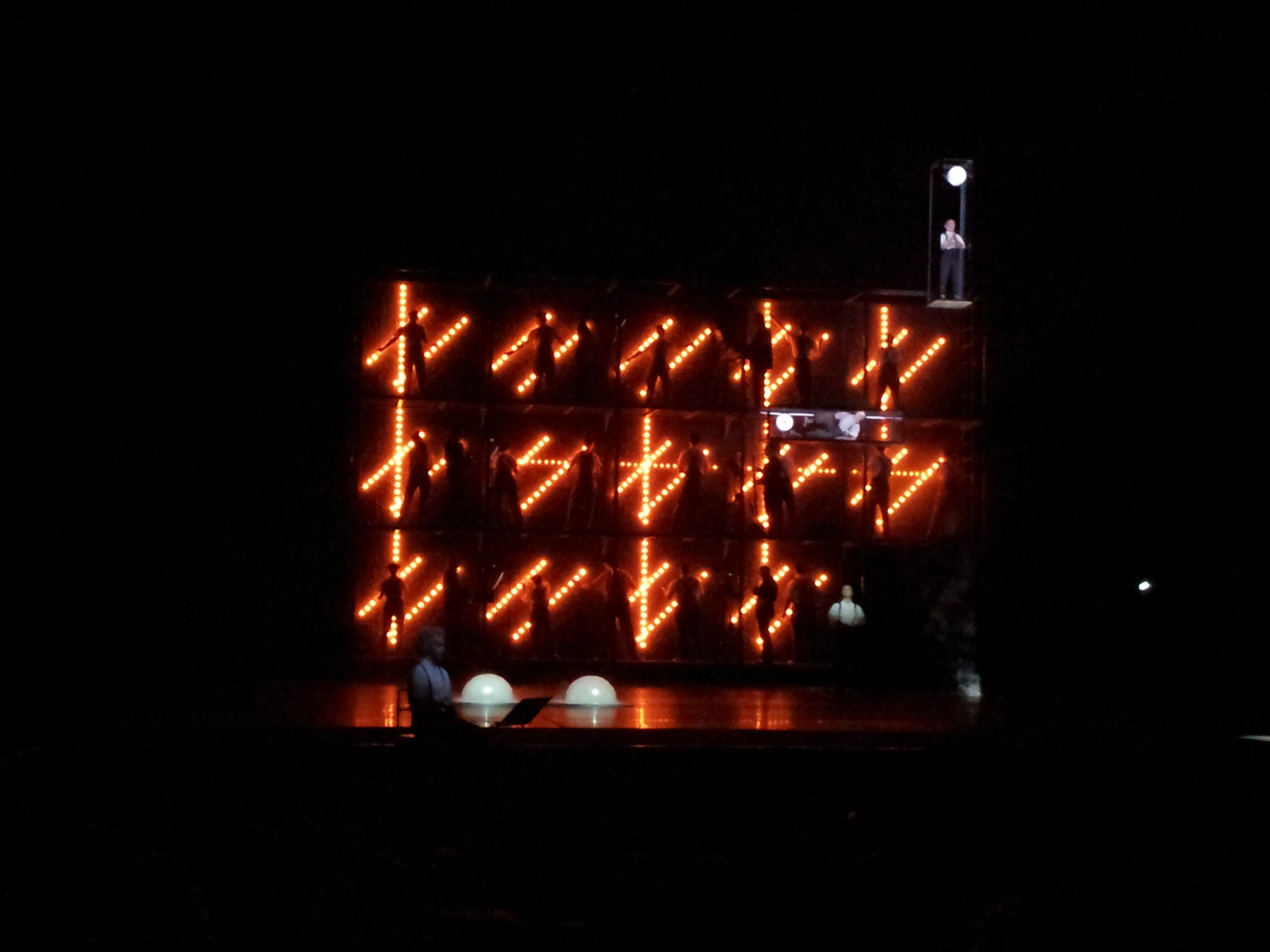
Act IV, Scene 3C "Space Machine" from Einstein on the Beach in Amsterdam, 2013

In 1968, he founded an experimental performance company, the Byrd Hoffman School of Byrds (named for the teacher who helped him manage a stutter while a teenager). With this company, he directed his first major works, beginning with 1969's The King of Spain and The Life and Times of Sigmund Freud. In 1972 he performed and directed "Ka Mountain and Guardenia Terrace", commissioned by the Shiraz Arts Festival. It ran unscripted for six nights and seven days nonstop on a hilltop, merging time and space into a mystical continuum. He began to work in opera in the early 1970s, creating Einstein on the Beach with composer Philip Glass and choreographer Andy deGroat. This work brought the artists worldwide renown. Following Einstein, Wilson worked increasingly with major European theaters and opera houses. For the New York debut of his first opera, the Metropolitan Opera allowed Wilson to rent the house on a Sunday, when they did not have a production, but would not produce the work.

In 1970, Wilson and a group of collaborators, including choreographer Andy deGroat and the dancer and actor Sheryl Sutton, devised the "silent opera" Deafman Glance in Iowa City, where it premiered at the Center for New Performing Arts on December 15. The large cast of the premiere production of Deafman Glance included Raymond Andrews and Ana Mendieta. The show subsequently traveled to the Nancy Festival in France and to the Brooklyn Academy of Music. It later opened in Paris, championed by the designer Pierre Cardin. The Surrealist poet Louis Aragon loved it and published a letter to the Surrealist poet André Breton (who had died in 1966), in which he praised Wilson as: "What we, from whom Surrealism was born, dreamed would come after us and go beyond us". In 1975, Wilson dissolved the Byrds and started to use professional actors.

In 1983/84, Wilson planned a performance for the 1984 Summer Olympics, the CIVIL warS: A Tree Is Best Measured When It Is Down; the complete work was to have been 12 hours long, in 6 parts. The production was only partially completed; the full event was canceled by the Olympic Arts Festival, due to insufficient funds. In 1986, the Pulitzer Prize jury unanimously selected the CIVIL warS for the drama prize, but the supervisory board rejected the choice and gave no drama award that year.

In 1990 alone, Wilson created four new productions in four different West German cities: Shakespeare's King Lear in Frankfurt, Anton Chekhov's Swansong in Munich, an adaptation of Virginia Woolf's Orlando in West Berlin, and The Black Rider a collaboration by Wilson, Tom Waits, and William S. Burroughs, in Hamburg.

In 1997, he was awarded the Europe Theatre Prize.

In 1998, Wilson staged August Strindberg's A Dream Play, at Stockholms Stadsteater, Sweden. It later headlined festivals in Recklinghausen, Nice, Perth, Bonn, Moscow, New York, and London.

In 2006 Wilson collaborated with filmmaker Katharina Otto-Bernstein on the documentary feature film "Absolute Wilson", chronicling his epic life, times, and creative genius; the film premiered in the Panorama section of Berlinale the same year and was later distributed by HBO and Studio Canal.

In 2010 Wilson was working on a new stage musical with composer (and long-time collaborator) Tom Waits and the Irish playwright, Martin McDonagh. His theatrical production of John Cage's Lecture on Nothing, which was commissioned for a celebration of the Cage centenary at the 2012 Ruhrtriennale, had its U.S. premiere in Royce Hall, UCLA, by the Center for the Art of Performance. Wilson performed Lectures on Nothing in its Australian premiere at the 2019 Supersense festival at the Arts Centre Melbourne.

In 2013 Wilson, in collaboration with Mikhail Baryshnikov and co-starring Willem Dafoe, developed The Old Woman, an adaptation of the work by the Russian author Daniil Kharms. The play premiered at MIF13, Manchester International Festival. Wilson wrote that he and Baryshnikov had discussed creating a play together for years, perhaps based on a Russian text. The final production included dance, light, singing, and bilingual monologue.

From 1999, Wilson premiered nine theatrical works in Berlin. By contrast, as of 2013, his last commission in the United States was 21 years ago. Here two images from his La traviata at Musiktheater Linz (2015), created by photographers Christian Michelides (left) and Francisco Peralta Torrejón (right), with Violetta Valéry shortly before her death:

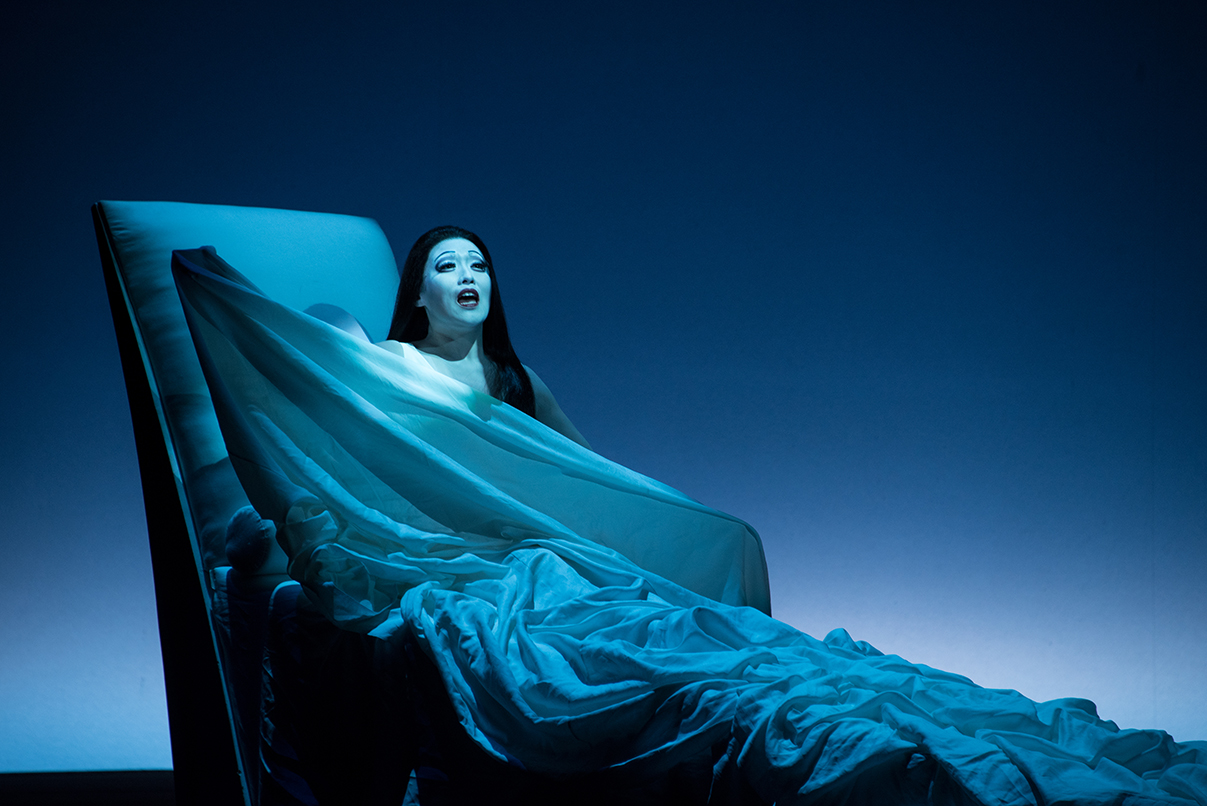

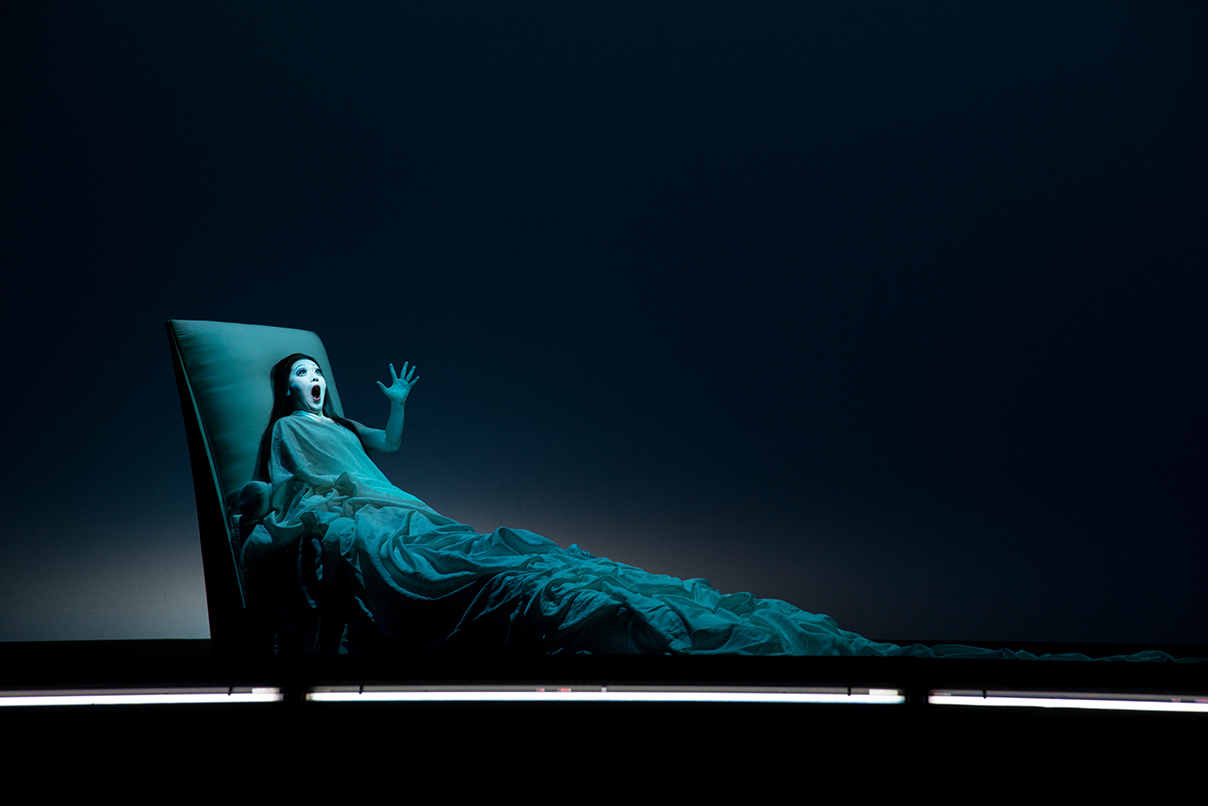

As of 2010, he continued to direct revivals of his most celebrated productions, including The Black Rider in London, San Francisco, Sydney, Australia, and Los Angeles; The Temptation of St. Anthony in New York and Barcelona; Erwartung in Berlin; Madama Butterfly at the Bolshoi Opera in Moscow; and Wagner's Der Ring des Nibelungen at Théâtre du Châtelet in Paris.

Wilson also directed all Monteverdi operas for the opera houses of La Scala in Milan and the Palais Garnier in Paris.

In 2017, Wilson created an opera with Anna Calvi titled "The Sandmann" based on the eponymous story by E.T.A. Hoffmann. The Sandman premiered on May 3, 2017, at the Ruhrfestspiele Festival, Recklinghausen, Germany and on May 20, 2017, at the Schauspielhaus Theater, Düsseldorf, Germany.

In 2021 Wilson directed a revival of Shakespeare's The Tempest at the Ivan Vazov National Theatre in Sofia, Bulgaria.

In 2022 he directed UBU, a theatrical performance, premiered at Es Baluard Museu in Palma.

In 2024, Wilson created an opera again with Anna Calvi titled "Moby Dick" based on the eponymous novel by Herman Melville. "Moby Dick" premiered on September 7, 2024, at the Düsseldorfer Schauspielhaus, Germany.

=== Visual art and design ===
In addition to his work for the stage, Wilson created sculpture, drawings, and furniture designs. Exhibited in December 1976 at the Paula Cooper Gallery, Wilson's storyboards were described by one critic as "serial art, equivalent to the slow-motion tempo of [Wilson's] theatrical style. In drawing after drawing after drawing, a detail is proposed, analyzed, refined, redefined, moved through various positions." He won the Golden Lion at the 1993 Venice Biennale for a sculptural installation.

In 2004, Ali Hossaini offered Wilson a residency at the television channel LAB HD. Thereafter, Wilson, with producer Esther Gordon and later with Matthew Shattuck, produced dozens of high-definition videos known as the Voom Portraits. Collaborators on this well-received project included the composer Michael Galasso, the late artist and designer Eugene Tsai, fashion designer Kevin Santos, and lighting designer Urs Schönebaum. In addition to celebrity subjects, sitters have included royalty, animals, Nobel Prize winners, and hobos.

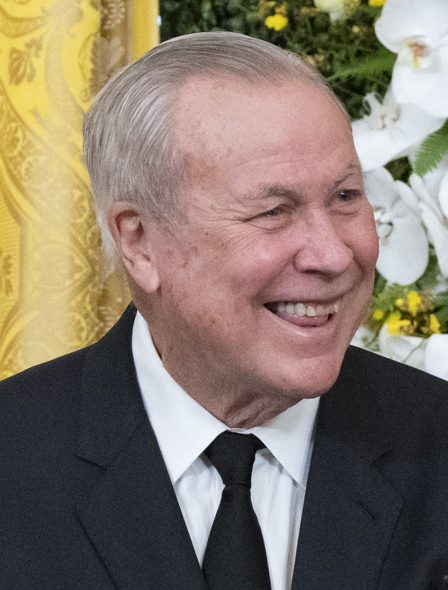
Wilson at the White House in 2023

In 2011, Wilson designed Tapio Wirkkala Park, an art park dedicated to the Finnish designer Tapio Wirkkala (1915–1985), situated in the Arabianranta district of Helsinki, Finland. His plans for the rectangular park feature a central square divided into nine equally sized fields separated by bushes. Each field will be installed with objects related to the home. For example, one unit will consist of a small fireplace surrounded by stones that serve as seating. The park will be lit by large, lightbox-style lamps build into the ground and by smaller ones modeled on ordinary floor lamps.

In 2013 American pop singer Lady Gaga announced that she would collaborate with Wilson as part of her ARTPOP project. He subsequently designed the set for her 2013 MTV Video Music Awards performance. Wilson also suggested that Gaga pose for his Voom Portraits. Knowing he had an upcoming residency as guest curator at the Louvre, Wilson chose themes from the museum's collection, all dealing with death. They shot the videos in a London studio over three days with Gaga standing for 14 or 15 hours at a time. Called "Living Rooms," the resulting exhibition included two video works: one inspired by Jacques-Louis David's The Death of Marat, hung in the painting galleries, and another in which Lady Gaga brings to life a painting by Ingres. In the Louvre's auditorium, Wilson hosted and took part in a series of performances, conversations, film screenings, and discussions. The centerpiece of the residency was a room filled with objects from the artist's personal collection in New York, including African masks, a Shaker chair, ancient Chinese ceramics, shoes worn by Marlene Dietrich, and a photo of Wilson and Philip Glass taken in the early 1980s by Robert Mapplethorpe.

== Personal life and death ==
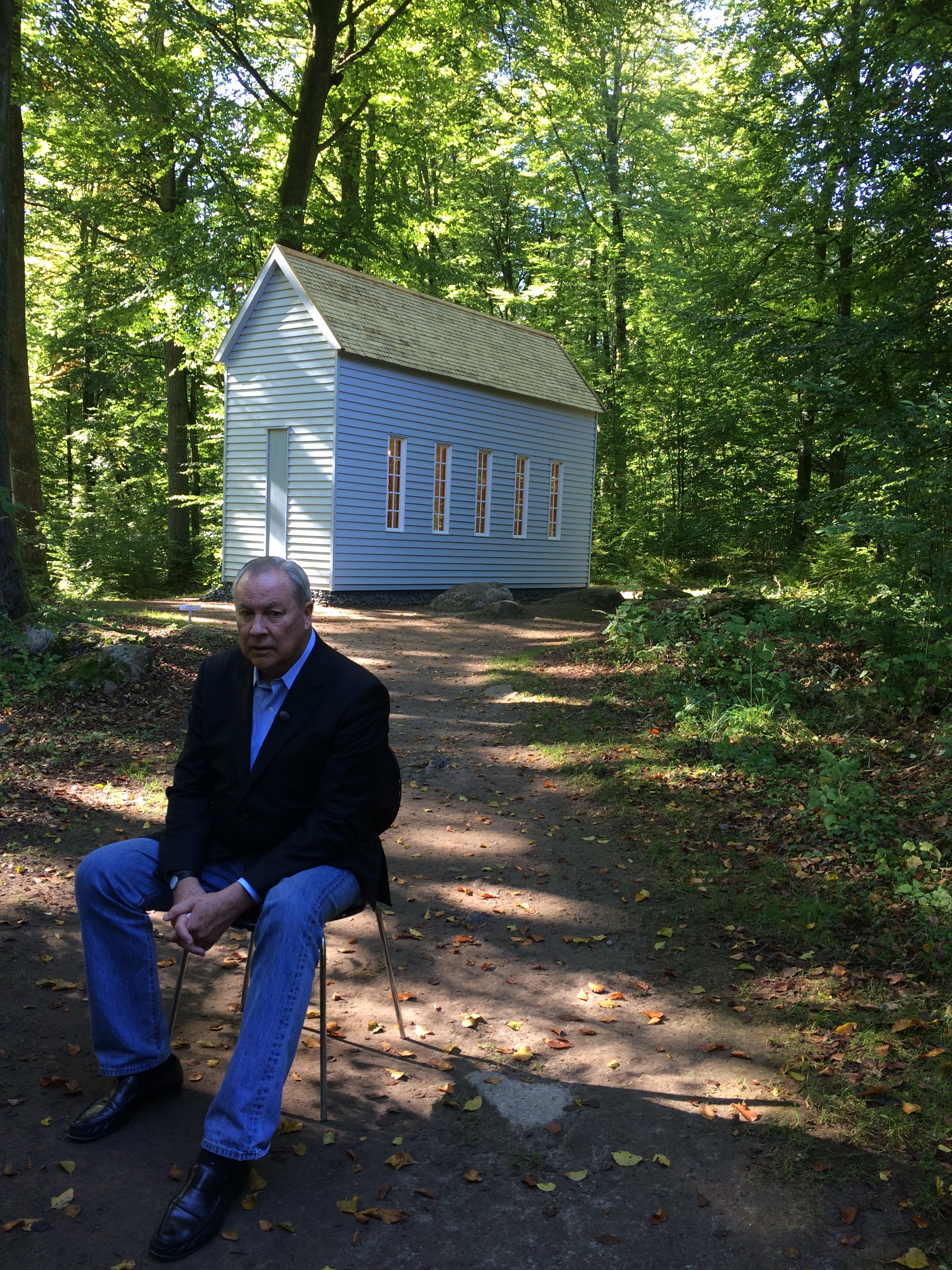
Wilson in 2014

Wilson lived in New York. As of 2000, he estimated that he "spends 10 days a year at his apartment in New York". For many years he was romantically involved with Andy de Groat, a dancer and choreographer with whom he collaborated in the 1970s.

Wilson died from a short illness at his home in Water Mill, New York, on July 31, 2025, at the age of 83.

== Style ==
Wilson is known for having pushed the boundaries of theater. His works are noted for their austere style, very slow movement, and often extreme scale in space or in time. The Life and Times of Joseph Stalin was a 12-hour performance, while KA MOUNTain and GUARDenia Terrace was staged on a mountaintop in Iran and lasted seven days.

=== Language ===
Language is one of the most important elements of theater and Robert Wilson felt at home with commanding it in many different ways. Wilson's impact on this part of theater alone is immense. Arthur Holmberg, professor of theater at Brandeis University, says that "In theatre, no one has dramatized the crisis of language with as much ferocious genius as Robert Wilson." Wilson made it evident in his work that whats and whys of language are terribly important and cannot be overlooked. Tom Waits, acclaimed songwriter and collaborator with Wilson, said this about Wilson's unique relationship with words:

Words for Bob are like tacks on the kitchen floor in the dark of night and you're barefoot. So Bob clears a path he can walk through words without getting hurt. Bob changes the values and shapes of words. In some sense they take on more meaning; in some cases, less.

Wilson showed the importance of language through all of his works and in many varying fashions. He credited his reading of the work of Gertrude Stein and listening to recordings of her speaking with "changing [his] way of thinking forever." Wilson directed three of Stein's works in the 1990s: Doctor Faustus Lights the Lights (1992), Four Saints in Three Acts (1996), and Saints and Singing (1998).

Wilson considered language and, down to its very ingredients, words, as a sort of "a social artifact". Not only does language change with time but it changes with person, with culture. Using his experience of working with mentally handicapped children and enlisting the collaboration of Christopher Knowles, a renowned autistic poet, allowed Wilson to attack language from many views. Wilson embraced this by often "juxtaposing levels of diction – Miltonic opulence and contemporary ling, crib poetry and pre-verbal screams" in an attempt to show his audience how elusive language really is and how ever-changing it can be. Visually showing words was another method Wilson used to show the beauty of language. Often his set designs, program covers, and posters were graffiti'd with words. This allowed the audience to look at the "language itself" rather than "the objects and meanings it refers to.".

The lack of language was essential to Wilson's work as well. In the same way an artist uses positive and negative space, Wilson used noise and silence. In working on a production of King Lear, Wilson inadvertently described his necessity of silence:

The way actors are trained here is wrong. All they think about is interpreting a text. They worry about how to speak words and know nothing about their bodies. You see that by the way they walk. They don't understand the weight of a gesture in space. A good actor can command an audience by moving one finger.

This emphasis on silence is fully explored in some of his works. Deafman Glance is a play without words, and his adaptation of Heiner Müller's play Quartet contained a fifteen-minute wordless prolog. Holmberg describes these works stating,

Language does many things and does them well. But we tend to shut our eyes to what language does not do well. Despite the arrogance of words – they rule traditional theatre with an iron fist – not all experience can be translated into a linguistic code.

Celebrated twentieth-century playwright Eugène Ionesco said that Wilson "surpassed Beckett" because "[Wilson's] silence is a silence that speaks". This silence onstage may be unnerving to audience members but serves a purpose of showing how important language is by its absence. It is Wilson's means of answering his own question: "Why is it no one looks? Why is it no one knows how to look? Why does no one see anything on stage?"

Another technique Wilson used was that of what words can mean to a particular character. His piece, I was sitting on my patio this guy appeared I thought I was hallucinating, features only two characters, both of whom deliver the same stream-of-consciousness monologue. In the play's first production one character was "aloof, cold, [and] precise" while the other "brought screwball comedy … warmth and color … playful[ness]". The different emphases and deliveries brought to the monologue two different meanings; "audiences found it hard to believe they heard the same monologue twice." Rather than tell his audience what words are supposed to mean, he opens them up for interpretation, presenting the idea that "meanings are not tethered to words like horses to hitching posts."

=== Movement ===
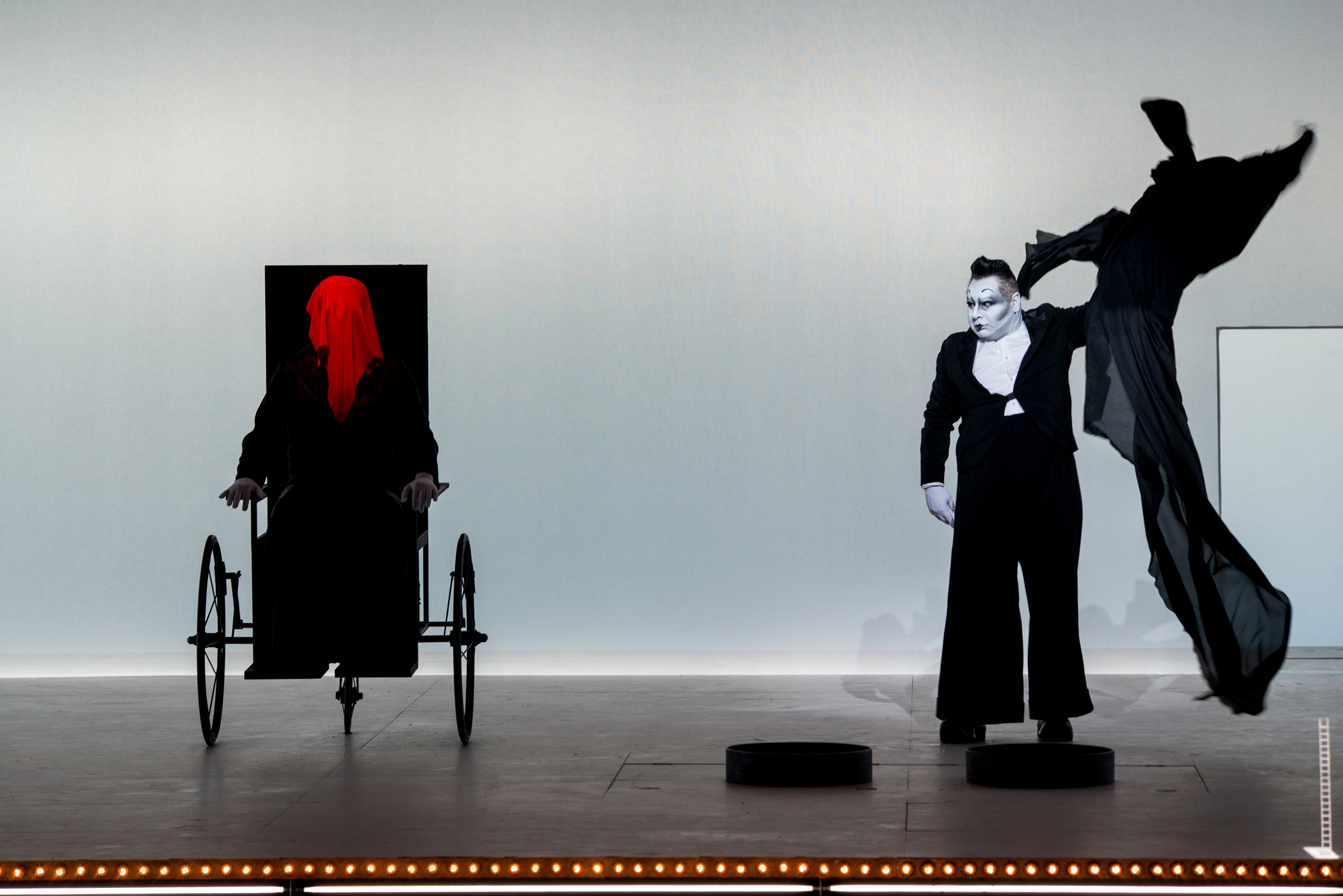
Endgame at Berliner Ensemble, 2016

Movement is a key element in Wilson's work. As a dancer, he saw the importance of the way an actor moves onstage and knew the weight that movement bears. When speaking of his "play without words" rendition of Henrik Ibsen's When We Dead Awaken, Wilson said:

I do movement before we work on the text. Later we'll put text and movement together. I do movement first to make sure it's strong enough to stand on its own two feet without words. The movement must have a rhythm and structure of its own. It must not follow the text. It can reinforce a text without illustrating it. What you hear and what you see are two different layers. When you put them together, you create another texture.

With such an emphasis on movement, Wilson even tailored his auditions around the necessity of it. In his auditions, "Wilson often does an elaborate movement sequence" and "asks the actor to repeat it." Thomas Derrah, an actor in the CIVIL warS, found the audition process to be baffling: "When I went in, [Wilson] asked me to walk across the room on a count of 31, sit down on a count of 7, put my hand to my forehead on a count of 59. I was mystified by the whole process". To further cement the importance of movement in Wilson's works, Seth Goldstein, another actor in the CIVIL warS, stated "every movement from the moment I walked onto the platform until I left was choreographed to the second. During the scene at table all I did was count movements. All I thought about was timing."

When it came time to add the text in with movement, there was still much work to be done. Wilson paid close attention to the text and still made sure there was enough "space around a text" for the audience to soak it up. At this point, the actors knew their movements and the time in which they were executed, allowing Wilson to tack the actions onto specific pieces of text. His overall goal was to have the rhythm of the text differ from that of the movement so his audience could see them as two completely different pieces, seeing each as what it was. When in the text/movement stage, Wilson often interrupted the rehearsal, saying things like "Something is wrong. We have to check your scripts to see if you put the numbers in the right place." He went on to explain the importance of this:

I know it's hell to separate text and movement and maintain two different rhythms. It takes time to train yourself to keep tongue and body working against each other. But things happen with the body that have nothing to do with what we say. It's more interesting if the mind and the body are in two different places, occupying different zones of reality.

These rhythms kept the mind on its toes, consciously and subconsciously taking in the meanings behind the movement and how it was matching up with the language.

Similar to Wilson's use of the lack of language in his works, he also saw the importance that a lack of movement can have. In his production of Medea, Wilson arranged a scene in which the lead singer stood still during her entire aria while many others moved around her. Wilson recalled that "she complained that if I didn't give her any movements, no one would notice her. I told her if she knew how to stand, everyone would watch her. I told her to stand like a marble statue of a goddess who had been standing in the same spot for a thousand years". Allowing an actor to have such stage presence without ever saying a word is very provocative, which is precisely what Wilson meant to accomplish with any sense of movement he put on the stage.

=== Lighting ===
Wilson believed that "the most important part of theatre" was light. He was concerned with how images were defined onstage, and this was related to the light of an object or tableau. He felt that the lighting design could really bring the production to life. The set designer for Wilson's the CIVIL warS, Tom Kamm, describes his philosophy: "a set for Wilson is a canvas for the light to hit like paint." He explains, "If you know how to light, you can make shit look like gold. I paint, I build, I compose with light. Light is a magic wand."

Wilson was "the only major director to get billing as a lighting designer" and was recognized by some as "the greatest light artist of our time". He designed with light to be flowing rather than an off-and-on pattern, thus making his lighting "like a musical score." Wilson's lighting designs featured "dense, palpable textures" and allowed "people and objects to leap out from the background. In his design for Quartett, Wilson used four hundred light cues in a span of only ninety minutes.

He was a perfectionist, persisting to achieve every aspect of his vision. A fifteen-minute monologue in Quartett took two days for him to light while a single hand gesture took nearly three hours. This attention to detail expressed his conviction that, "light is the most important actor on stage." In a conversation with theater expert Octavian Saiu, Wilson was asked whether he was disturbed by the fact that his style was often imitated. His response was that "the world is a library", and therefore every artist is free to borrow from other artists.

=== Props ===
Wilson's interest in design extended to the props in his productions, which he designed and sometimes participated in constructing. Whether it was furniture, a light bulb, or a giant crocodile, Wilson treated each as a work of art in its own right. He demanded that a full-scale model of each prop be constructed before the final one was made, in order "to check proportion, balance, and visual relationships" on stage. Once he approved the model, the crew would build the prop, and Wilson was "renowned for sending them back again and again and again until they satisfy him". He was so strict in his attention to detail that when Jeff Muscovin, his technical director for Quartett, suggested they use an aluminum chair with a wood skin rather than a completely wooden chair, Wilson replied:

No, Jeff, I want wood chairs. If we make them out of aluminum, they won't sound right when they fall over and hit the floor. They'll sound like metal, not wood. It will sound false. Just make sure you get strong wood. And no knots.

Such attention to detail and perfectionism usually resulted in an expensive collection of props. "Curators regard them as sculptures" and the props have been sold for prices ranging from "$4,500 to $80,000."

== Exhibitions ==
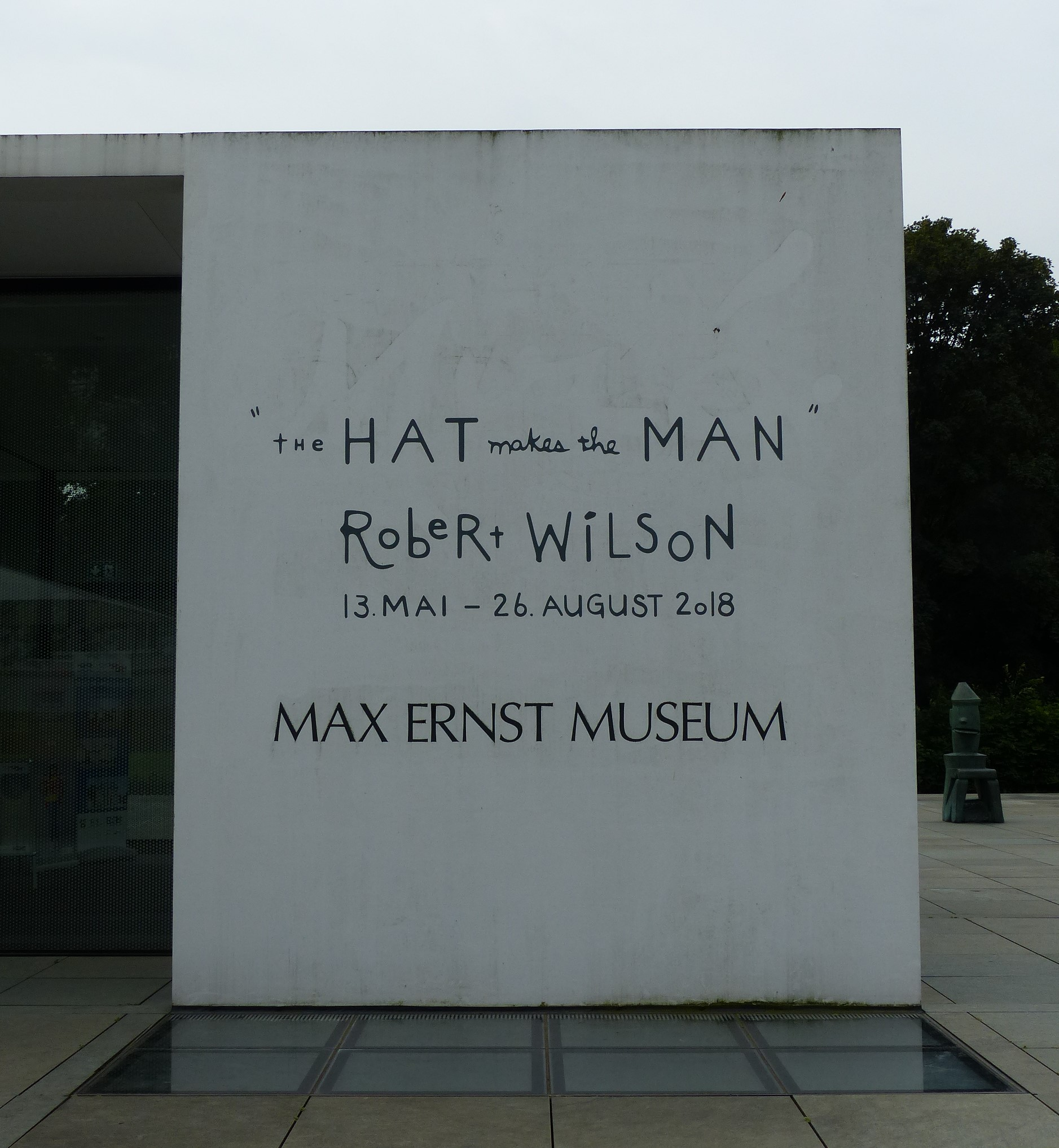
Exhibition at the Max Ernst Museum, 2018

Extensive retrospectives of Wilson's efforts have been presented at the Centre Georges Pompidou in Paris (1991) and the Boston Museum of Fine Arts (1991). He presented installations at the Stedelijk Museum Amsterdam, Museum Boymans-van Beuningen, Rotterdam (1993), London's Clink Street Vaults (1995), Neue Nationalgalerie (2003), and the Solomon R. Guggenheim Museum in New York and the Guggenheim Museum Bilbao. His tribute to Isamu Noguchi was exhibited at the Seattle Art Museum and his Voom Portraits exhibition traveled to Hamburg, Milan, Miami, and Philadelphia. In 2012, Times Square Arts invited Wilson to show selections from his three-minute video portraits on more than twenty digital screens that lined Times Square. In 2013 he participated at the White House Biennial / Thessaloniki Biennale 4. He collaborated with artist Bettina WitteVeen on an exhibition space based on her photography book "Sacred Sister." The book consisted of photos of women that WitteVeen captured in Indonesia and Southeast Asia in 1995. The exhibition space was set up in 2003 at Art Basel Miami Beach, and was also composed of layers of autumn leaves on the floor of a studio.

Wilson was represented exclusively and worldwide by RW Work, Ltd. (New York), and his gallerist in New York City was Paula Cooper Gallery.

== The Watermill Center ==
In 1991 Wilson established The Watermill Center on the site of a former Western Union laboratory on the East End of Long Island, New York. Originally styled as "a laboratory for performance", The Watermill Center operates year-round artist residencies, public education programs, exhibitions, and performances. The center is situated within a ten-acre (4.0 ha) campus of gardens and designed landscape, and contains numerous works of art collected by Wilson. The International Summer Residency Program enabled 20 international artists to participate in a 4-week intensive session in which they could develop new works alongside emerging artists and established creative professionals.

== Europe Theatre Prize ==
In 1997 he was awarded the V Europe Theatre Prize, in Taormina, with the following motivation:

The Jury of the fifth Europe Theatre Prize has unanimously awarded the Prize to Robert Wilson in recognition of his thirty years' work aimed at creating a personal reinvention of scenic art that has overturned the temporal dimension and retraced the spatial one. He refused to render a mere production of reality and offered an abstract or informal vision of the text and also redefined the roles, whenever possible, through global intervention in the creation of his performances where he was author, director, performer, scenographer and magic light designer. Architect by profession, the artist pursued an indisciplinary language that did not ignore the visual arts in enhancing the importance of the image and, restoring the support of music, he approached dance and simultaneously attempted to find a pure harmonious value in the spoken word, in an ideal tension towards a form of total theater.

It has been said that his works can be considered part of a single opus in continual evolution that constitutes the synthesis. During his career Wilson has confronted himself with different genres and drawn them closer thanks to the conformity of language. He has executed classical works and specially written works and for this reasons he has stimulated the interest of eminent writers, such as William Burroughs and Heiner Müller establishing a particular bond with him.

He has dedicated himself to teaching non theatrical literary works often adapted into monologs interpreted by eminent actors, such as Madeleine Renaud and Marianne Hoppe. He has ventured into the production of opera and ballet, he has created musicals sui generis in collaboration with illustrious emerging personalities, he has promoted performances especially with Christopher Knowles, he has directed spectacular fashion parades. His prolific activity as designer and visual artist can be seen in his paintings, sculptures, installations, graphic works, exhibitions. He was awarded the major prize at the Venice Biennale.

Nothing new can be achieved without changing the conceptions of organization. He was a decisive promoter of coproduction of festivals since the '70s, of the creation of prototype-performances that could be translated in various nations with new casts, and also of the creation of serial works to be completed later in production studios. Thanks are due to him for the embrace between different nations, languages, styles and traditions.

Even when using bigger and bigger and more and more international teams of collaborators Wilson has never renounced making his own imprint of perfectionist in a developing opera. He has to be accredited with the Watermill Centre, center of experimentation and training where his work as a teacher has helped him in retain an inexhaustible flow of fresh ideas from the contact with the young people.

== Appraisals ==
Wilson was described by The New York Times as "[America]'s – or even the world's – foremost vanguard 'theater artist.'"

Miroslava Kortenska wrote in 2015: Wilson "has developed as an avant-garde artist specifically in Europe amongst its modern quests, in its most significant cultural centers, galleries, museums, opera houses and theaters, and festivals".

== Awards and honors ==
- 1971 and 1980 Guggenheim Fellowship awards
- 1971 Drama Desk Award for Outstanding Director for Deafman Glance
- 1975 Rockefeller Foundation Fellowship
- 1981 Asian Cultural Council Fellowship
- 1986 Nomination for the Pulitzer Prize for Drama
- 1987 Subject of documentary Robert Wilson and the Civil Wars, directed by Howard Brookner
- 1990 The Mysteries and What's So Funny
- 1993 Golden Lion for Sculpture from the Venice Biennale
- 1996 The Dorothy and Lillian Gish Prize
- 1997 Europe Theatre Prize
- 2000 Election to the American Academy of Arts and Letters
- 2001 National Design Award for Lifetime Achievement
- 2002 Commandeur des arts et des lettres
- 2005 Honorary doctorate from University of Toronto
- 2009 Hein Heckroth Prize – Lifetime Achievement for Scenic Design
- 2009 Medal for Arts and Sciences of the city of Hamburg
- 2009 Trophée des Arts Award, Alliance française
- 2013 Honorary doctorate from the City University of New York
- 2013 Laurence Olivier Award for Best New Opera for Einstein on the Beach
- 2013 Paez Medal of Art from VAEA
- 2023 Praemium Imperiale

== Works ==
=== Premieres ===
- Duricglte & Tomorrow, 1965
- Modern Dance (four dances), 1965
- The King of Spain, 1969
- The Life and Times of Sigmund Freud, 1969
- Handbill, 1970
- Deafman Glance (film) (with Raymond Andrews), 1970
- Program Prologue Now: Overture for a Deafman, 1971
- KA MOUNTAIN AND GUARDenia TERRACE: a story about a family and some people changing, 1972
- The Life and Times of Joseph Stalin, 1973
- DiaLog/A Mad Man A Mad Giant A Mad Dog A Mad Urge A Mad Face, 1974
- A Letter for Queen Victoria, 1974
- The $ Value of Man, 1975
- Einstein on the Beach (with Philip Glass), 1976
- I Was Sitting on My Patio This Guy Appeared I Thought I Was Hallucinating (with Lucinda Childs), 1977
- Death Destruction & Detroit, 1979
- Edison (play), 1979
- The Golden Windows (Die Goldenen Fenster), 1979
- Dialogue/Curious George (play), 1980
- Stations (play), 1982
- Medea (opera with Gavin Bryars), Lyon 1984
- The Civil Wars: A Tree Is Best Measured When It Is Down, 1984
- Death Destruction & Detroit II, 1987
- Heiner Müller's Quartet, 1987
- Orlando (adapted by Darryl Pinckney from the novel by Virginia Woolf), 1989
- Louis Andriessen's De Materie, 1989
- The Black Rider (with William S. Burroughs and Tom Waits), 1990
- Alice (musical, with Tom Waits and Paul Schmidt), 1992
- Gertrude Stein's Doctor Faustus Lights the Lights, Hebbel Theatre (Berlin) 1992
- Skin, Meat, Bone (with Alvin Lucier), 1994
- The Meek Girl (based on a story by Fyodor Dostoevsky), 1994
- Timerocker (with Lou Reed), 1997
- Persephone (texts by Homer, Brad Gooch, Maita di Niscemi, music by Gioachino Rossini and Philip Glass), Taormina, 1997
- O Corvo Branco (with Philip Glass), Teatro Camões (Lisbon), 1998
- Monsters of Grace (with Philip Glass), 1998
- Wings on Rock for the Teatro della Fortuna, Fano, 1998
- Bertolt Brecht's The Flight Across the Ocean for the Berliner Ensemble, 1998
- The Days Before – Death Destruction & Detroit III, (with Ryuichi Sakamoto), Lincoln Center 1999
- POEtry, (with Lou Reed), 2000
- Hot Water (multimedia concert), (with Tzimon Barto), 2000
- Woyzeck (with Tom Waits), 2000
- Persephone, 2001
- White Town an homage to Arne Jacobsen at Bellevue Teatret Copenhagen, 2002
- The Temptation of Saint Anthony (with Bernice Johnson Reagon) Opéra National de Paris, 2003
- I La Galigo, 2004
- Jean de La Fontaine's The Fables, Comédie-Française, 2005
- Rumi, Polish National Opera, 2008
- Sonnets (based on Shakespeare's sonnets with music by Rufus Wainwright), Berliner Ensemble, 2009
- [KOOL – Dancing in my mind], (a performance/portrait of choreographer and dancer Suzushi Hanayagi), 2009
- The Life and Death of Marina Abramović, with Marina Abramović, Manchester International Festival, July 9–16, 2011, The Lowry, Manchester, UK
- Peter Pan, with CocoRosie at the Berliner Ensemble, April 2013
- The Life and Death of Marina Abramović, with Marina Abramović, Luminato Festival, Bluma Appel Theatre, Toronto, June 14–17, 2013
- The Old Woman (play), with Willem Dafoe and Mikhail Baryshnikov, Manchester International Festival, Palace Theatre, Manchester, UK, July 2013
- 1914, based on The Last Days of Mankind by Karl Kraus and The Good Soldier Švejk by Jaroslav Hašek, Estates Theatre, Prague, Czech Republic, April 2014
- Adam's Passion with Arvo Pärt, Noblessner Foundry, Tallinn, Estonia, May 2015
- Pushkin's Fairy Tales (play) (with CocoRosie), Theatre of Nations, Moscow, Russia, June 2015
- Mary Said What She Said with Isabelle Huppert, Wiener Festwochen, Vienna, Austria, May 2019
- The Sandman (2017) with Anna Calvi, Düsseldorf May 2017
- Messiah (2020)
- The Tempest, Ivan Vazov National Theatre, Sofia, Bulgaria, November 2021
- UBU, with texts by Eli Troen after Alfred Jarry's Ubu Roi, Es Baluard Museum, Palma de Mallorca, Spain, October 2022
- Moby Dick, with Anna Calvi, Düsseldorf September 2024

=== Revivals ===
- Shakespeare's King Lear, 1985
- Heiner Müller's Hamletmachine, 1986
- Alceste by Christoph Willibald Gluck, 1986. Théâtre du Châtelet, Paris, 1999. English Baroque Soloists & Monteverdi Choir, John Eliot Gardiner, cond.; Anne Sofie von Otter (Alceste), Paul Groves (Admète), Dietrich Henschel (High Priest and Hercules), Yann Beuron (Evandre), Ludovic Tézier (A Herald and Apollo), Frédéric Caton (Oracle and Infernal God), Hjördis Thébault (Coryphée). Image Entertainment ID9307RADVD (2000) / Warner Classics #16570 (2009)
- Euripides' Alcestis, 1986–1987
- Le martyre de Saint Sébastien, 1988
- Richard Wagner's Parsifal, Hamburg, 1991
- Pelléas et Mélisande by Claude Debussy, 1997. Paris, 2012. Orchestre de l'Opéra national de Paris, Philippe Jordan, cond.; Chœur de l'Opéra national de Paris, Patrick Marie Aubert. Stéphane Degout (Pelléas); Elena Tsallagova (Mélisande); Vincent Le Texier (Golaud); Anne Sofie von Otter (Geneviève); Franz-Josef Selig (Arkel); Julie Mathevet (The little Yniold); Jérôme Varnier (Un berger, le médecin). Naive # 2159
- Lohengrin for the Metropolitan Opera, 1998
- Orphée et Eurydice by Christoph Willibald Gluck. Théâtre du Châtelet, Paris, 1999. Orchestre Révolutionnaire et Romantique & Monteverdi Choir, John Eliot Gardiner, cond.; Magdalena Kožená (Orphée); Madeline Bender (Eurydice); Patricia Petibon (Amour); Arthaus Musik #100062 (2000)/ Warner Classics # 16577 (2009)
- Richard Wagner's Der Ring des Nibelungen, Zurich Opera, 2000-2002
- Richard Strauss's Die Frau ohne Schatten, Opéra National de Paris (Opéra Bastille), 2002
- Aida, Royal Opera House (Covent Garden), 2003
- Ibsen's Peer Gynt, 2005 (in Norway)
- Büchner's Leonce and Lena
- Brecht's The Threepenny Opera, Berliner Ensemble, 2007
- Beckett's Happy Days, 2008
- Faust for the Polish National Opera, 2008
- L'Orfeo by Claudio Monteverdi, La Scala, Milan 2009. Milan Teatro alla Scala Orchestra, Concerto Italiano, Rinaldo Alessandrini, cond.; Georg Nigl (Orfeo); Roberta Invernizzi (La Musica/Euridice/Eco); Sara Mingardo (Sylvia/Speranza); Luigi de Donato (Caronte); Raffaella Milanesi (Proserpina); Giovanni Battista Parodi (Plutone); Furio. OPUS ARTE 1044
- Il ritorno d'Ulisse in patria, by Claudio Monteverdi, La Scala, Milan 2011
- Claude Debussy's Pelléas et Mélisande, Teatro Real de Madrid, 2011
- Rhinoceros, by Eugène Ionesco, Teatrul Național Marin Sorescu, Craiova, Romania, July 2014
- Faust I and II with Herbert Grönemeyer at the Berliner Ensemble, April 2015
- La Traviata with Teodor Currentzis, Perm Opera and Ballet Theatre, Perm, Russia, November 2016
- Hamletmachine, by Heiner Müller and Robert Wilson (with the performers of the Accademia Nazionale di Arte Drammatica Silvioo D'Amico), Auditorium Parco della Musica, Rome, 2017

=== Exhibitions ===
- Mr. Bojangles' Memory, Og Son of Fire, 1991
- 14 Stations (installation), 2000
- Isamu Noguchi exhibition, 2003
- VOOM Portraits, exhibition, 2007 at ACE Gallery in Los Angeles, CA
- Mind gap exhibition, Norwegian Museum of Science and Technology, 2011
- The Hat Makes the Man, Museum Max Ernst, Bruhl, 2017
