= Frank Dunlop (director) =

British theatre director (1927–2026)

Frank Dunlop CBE
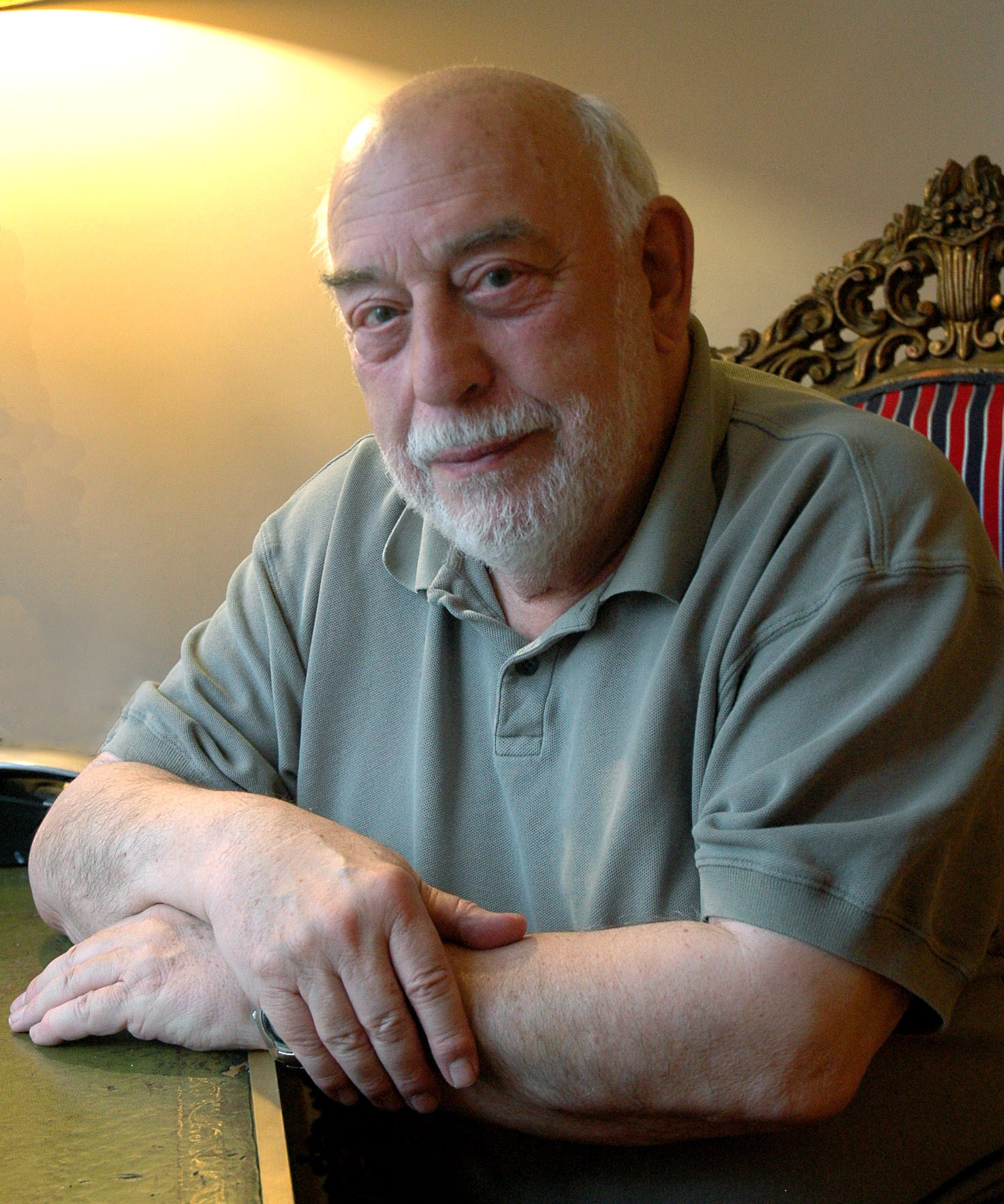
- Dunlop in 2011 by Allan Warren
- Born: 15 February 1927; Leeds, West Riding of Yorkshire, England
- Died: 4 January 2026 (aged 98); New York City, U.S.
- Occupation: Theatre director
- Years active: 1954–2026

Frank Dunlop CBE (15 February 1927 – 4 January 2026) was a British theatre director. He is best known as the creator of the Young Vic theatre and theatre company, which features young actors and reaches a youthful theatre audience. Dunlop was artistic and administrative director of the Young Vic from 1968 through 1971, and he directed plays for the company throughout the 1970s.

His other major administrative theatrical positions included administrative director of the National Theatre from 1968 to 1971, and director of the Edinburgh International Festival from 1984 through 1991.

== Life and career ==
=== Early years and education ===
Dunlop was born in Leeds, England, on 15 February 1927, to Charles Norman Dunlop and Mary Aarons. He was educated at Beauchamp College, read English at University College London where he was a lifelong Fellow, and studied with Michel Saint-Denis at the Old Vic theatre school in London.

=== Career ===
Dunlop founded and directed his own young theatre company, The Piccolo Theatre in Manchester (1954), and directed The Enchanted at the Bristol Old Vic in 1955 where, a year later, he became its resident director, writing and staging Les Frere Jacques. He made his West End debut at the Adelphi Theatre in 1960 with a production of The Bishop's Bonfire.

He took over the helm at the Nottingham Playhouse from 1961–1964, including the inaugural season of the newly built theatre in 1963, and then directed several plays in London, Oklahoma and Edinburgh. In 1966 he founded The Pop Theatre Company at the Edinburgh Festival, with productions of The Winter's Tale (also seen in Venice and London) and The Trojan Women.

Dunlop also produced the theatrical production of Oblomov, based on the novel by Russian writer Ivan Goncharov. The play opened at London's Lyric Theatre on 6 October 1964, and starred Spike Milligan as Oblomov, and Joan Greenwood as his wife Olga. The play ran for a record-breaking five weeks at the Lyric, before being retitled Son of Oblomov and moved to the Comedy Theatre in London's West End, with Dunlop once again the producer.

==== The National and The Young Vic ====
In 1967, he joined the National Theatre as Associate Director, and worked as Administrative Director from 1968 to 1971, where he directed Home and Beauty (1968) The White Devil (1969) and The Captain of Köpenick starring Paul Scofield (1971).

While at the National, then located at the Old Vic, he took a crucial career step with the creation of The Young Vic in 1969. His productions for them included The Taming of the Shrew (1970); The Comedy of Errors (1971); Genet's The Maids, Deathwatch and The Alchemist (1972); an acclaimed revival of Rattigan's French Without Tears, and his own play Scapino (1974); and Macbeth (1975). The original, high camp production of Bible One: Joseph and the Amazing Technicolour Dreamcoat, starring Gary Bond, was created by him with the Young Vic company at the Edinburgh Festival in 1972, and transferred to the Round House in November 1972.

==== London and New York ====
During the 1970s Dunlop divided his time between London and New York, continuing to oversee the Young Vic while concurrently directing the Brooklyn Academy of Music Theater Company from 1976 to 1978. For the RSC in 1974 he directed a revival of William Gillette's Sherlock Holmes, starring John Wood, at the Aldwych Theatre in London, which then enjoyed a long run in New York; where he again directed Scapino, starring Jim Dale, also seen in Los Angeles, Australia and Norway.

Dunlop's other New York successes included Habeas Corpus (1975) and The Last of Mrs. Cheyney (1978), During this period he founded and for two years ran the BAM Theatre Company, directing for them The New York Idea, Three Sisters, The Devil's Disciple, The Play's the Thing and Julius Caesar.

Back in England he directed Antony and Cleopatra starring iconic French actress Delphine Seyrig as Cleopatra for the Young Vic Theater (1976), Rookery Nook for the Birmingham Rep and the Theatre Royal Haymarket (1979), and returning to New York the following year he directed Camelot starring Richard Burton.

==== Edinburgh ====
Dunlop was director of the Edinburgh International Festival for eight years from 1984−1991. He inherited a deficit of £175,000, and said that he would not have taken on the job had he known about it. He had a difficult relationship with Edinburgh District Council, whose radical Labour administration railed against the Festival's "ingrained elitism".

Dunlop made improvements to the representation of Scottish drama in the Festival programme. He revived Sir David Lyndsay's Ane Satyre of the Thrie Estaitis, Sydney Goodsir Smith's The Wallace, and James Bridie's Holy Isle. He also directed Friedrich Schiller's Maria Stuart and a dramatisation of Robert Louis Stevenson's Treasure Island.

Dunlop received an Honorary Doctorate from Heriot-Watt University in 1989.

==== Later career ====
In 2001, Dunlop directed the world premiere of Ed Dixon's Scenery at Guild Hall, starring Emmy and Obie winner Marilyn Sokol and two-time Tony nominee Clive Revill. The production was produced by Steven Sendor. He has staged opera, including Carmen at the Royal Albert Hall, and in the summer of 2004 Jim Dale and William Atherton starred in the premiere of his adaptation of Kathrine Kressman Taylor's short epistolary novel Address Unknown at the Promenade Theatre on Broadway, again working with Steven Sendor as his producer. In 2007 Dunlop directed longtime friend Rosemary Harris in Éric-Emmanuel Schmitt's one-act play Oscar and the Pink Lady at San Diego's Old Globe Theatre.

National Life Stories conducted an interview (C1173/20) with Dunlop on his memories of Richard Negri in 2007 for its An Oral History of Theatre Design collection held by the British Library.

Dunlop was appointed CBE in 1977 and received the Chevalier of the Order of Arts and Literature presented to him by the French government in 1987.

== Death ==
Dunlop died in Manhattan on 4 January 2026, at the age of 98.

== Sources ==
- Who's Who in the Theatre, 16th and 17th editions, Pitman/Gale (1977/1981)
- The National: The Theatre and its work 1963-1997 by Simon Callow, Nick Hern Books/RNT (1997)
- Andrew Lloyd Webber: His Life and Works by Michael Walsh, Abrams (1989)
