= Doctor Jazz =

1926 song by Joe "King" Oliver

"Doctor Jazz" is a popular tune and song written by Joe "King" Oliver in 1926.

Publisher Walter Melrose got his name on it as co-composer, as was often his practice. It enjoyed its initial popularity in the 1920s. It continues to be played by Dixieland jazz groups. It has been performed by many notable acts, such as Jelly Roll Morton, Chris Barber, Harry Connick Jr. and Dutch Swing College Band. Louis Armstrong recorded the song in 1959.

"Doctor Jazz" as a record made by Jelly Roll Morton and his Red Hot Peppers in 1926, is a prime example of early New Orleans jazz counterpoint and collective improvisation. The number of special features, pre-written stop-time breaks and improvised solo passages in this record yield a tapestry of musical contrasts. Jazz was producing significant accomplishments in its other aspects, such as the development of the soloist, but the specifically New Orleans jazz style of collective counterpoint playing would reach its apotheosis here and in a few other 1926-7 Morton recordings.

The Bonzo Doo Dah Dog Band did a performance of this song on their 1969 release Tadpoles.
