= Andy de Groat =

American choreographer (1947–2019)

- Born: November 1947; Paterson, New Jersey, U.S.
- Died: January 10, 2019 (aged 71); Montauban, France
- Occupation: Choreographer
- Years active: 1972–2019

Andy de Groat (November 1947 – January 10, 2019) was an American choreographer best known for his collaborations with interdisciplinary impresario Robert Wilson.

== Early life and education ==
Born in November 1947 in Paterson, New Jersey, de Groat grew up in a working-class family with little involvement in the arts. His father, a truck driver, was unsupportive of his interests, and de Groat had little contact with his family after leaving high school. He was studying painting at the School of Visual Arts in New York when he met Robert Wilson in late 1966 at the Bleecker Street Cinema in Greenwich Village, where de Groat had a part-time job.

== Career ==
de Groat started his career in 1972, where he choreographed the plays Ouverture at that year's Shiraz Arts Festival. He also helped to choreograph Le Regard du Deaf and Einstein on the Beach at the 1976 Festival d'Avignon. He created the Red Notes dancing company in New York City in 1973. He created two ballets titled Red Notes and Fan Dance.

In 1982, de Groat moved his dance company to France. Henceforth he lived in Paris, Tarbes, and Montauban. He specialized in spinning, and applied it to works such as The Nutcracker, La Bayadère, and Giselle.

C.C.I.N.P. andydegroat is a french association created in 2019, by andy's former dancers to take care of his artistic work, in order to successfully carry out projects around the choreographer’s work, and to make his work known, transmitted, and promoted.They work with CND Pantin were its archives are preserved.

== Personal life ==
He was romantically involved with Robert Wilson for many years. Almost 20 years prior to his death, de Groat had a stroke impairing his movement and speech.

== Choreographic works ==
- Rope Dance translations (1974)
- Red Notes (1977)
- Fan Dance (1978)
- Stabat Mater (1991)
- La Bayadère (1993)
- Tangos (1995)
- Swan Lake (1996)
- The Nutcracker (1996)
- Igitur or Elbehnon's Folly (2009)
- SEE MORE
