= Tony Award for Best Actor in a Play =

American theatre award for Broadway actors

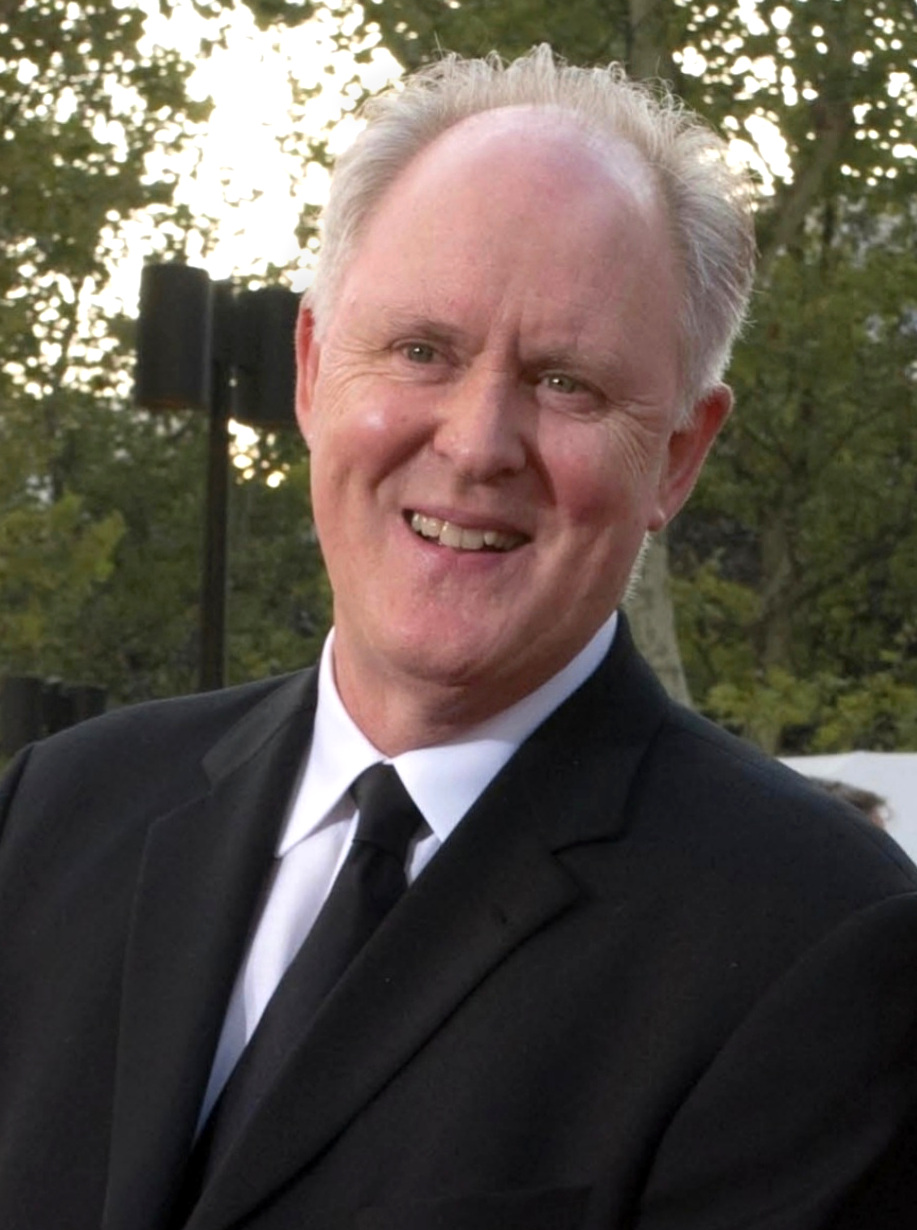
- 2026 Recipient: John Lithgow
- Awarded for: Best Performance by a Leading Actor in a Play
- Location: New York City
- Presented by: American Theatre Wing The Broadway League
- Currently held by: John Lithgow for Giant (2026)
- Website: TonyAwards.com

The Tony Award for Best Performance by a Leading Actor in a Play is an honor presented at the Tony Awards, a ceremony established in 1947 as the Antoinette Perry Awards for Excellence in Theatre, to actors for quality leading roles in a Broadway play. The awards are named after Antoinette Perry, an American actress who died in 1946.

Honors in several categories are presented at the ceremony annually by the Tony Award Productions, a joint venture of The Broadway League and the American Theatre Wing, to "honor the best performances and stage productions of the previous year."

The award was originally called the Tony Award for Actors—Play. It was first presented to José Ferrer and Fredric March at the 1st Tony Awards for their portrayals of Cyrano de Bergerac and Clinton Jones in Cyrano de Bergerac and Years Ago, respectively. Before 1956, nominees' names were not made public; the change was made by the awards committee to "have a greater impact on theatregoers".

Nine actors hold the record for having the most wins in this category, with a total of two. Brian Bedford and Jason Robards are tied with the most nominations, with a total of seven. George in Who's Afraid of Virginia Woolf? is the character to take the award the most times, winning three times. Willy Loman in Death of a Salesman is the character to be nominated the most times, with five total nominations.

== Winners and nominees ==
indicates the winner

José Ferrer won twice for Cyrano de Bergerac (1947) and The Shrike (1952)

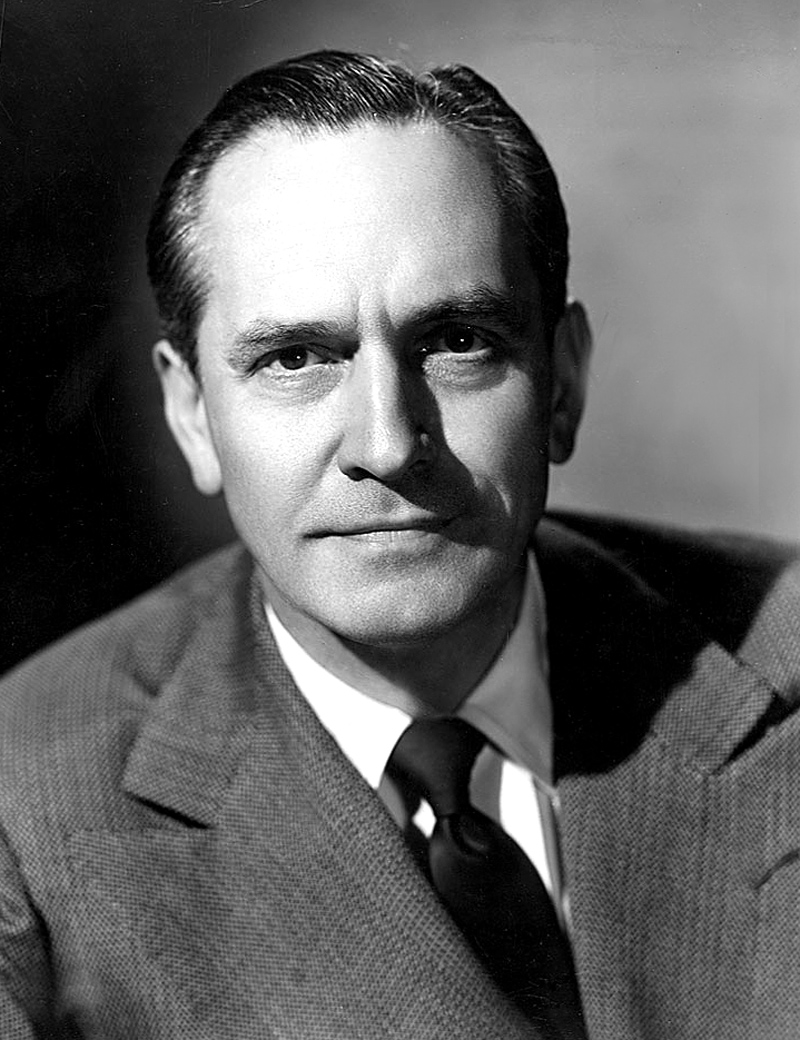
Fredric March won twice for Years Ago (1947) and in Long Day's Journey into Night (1957)

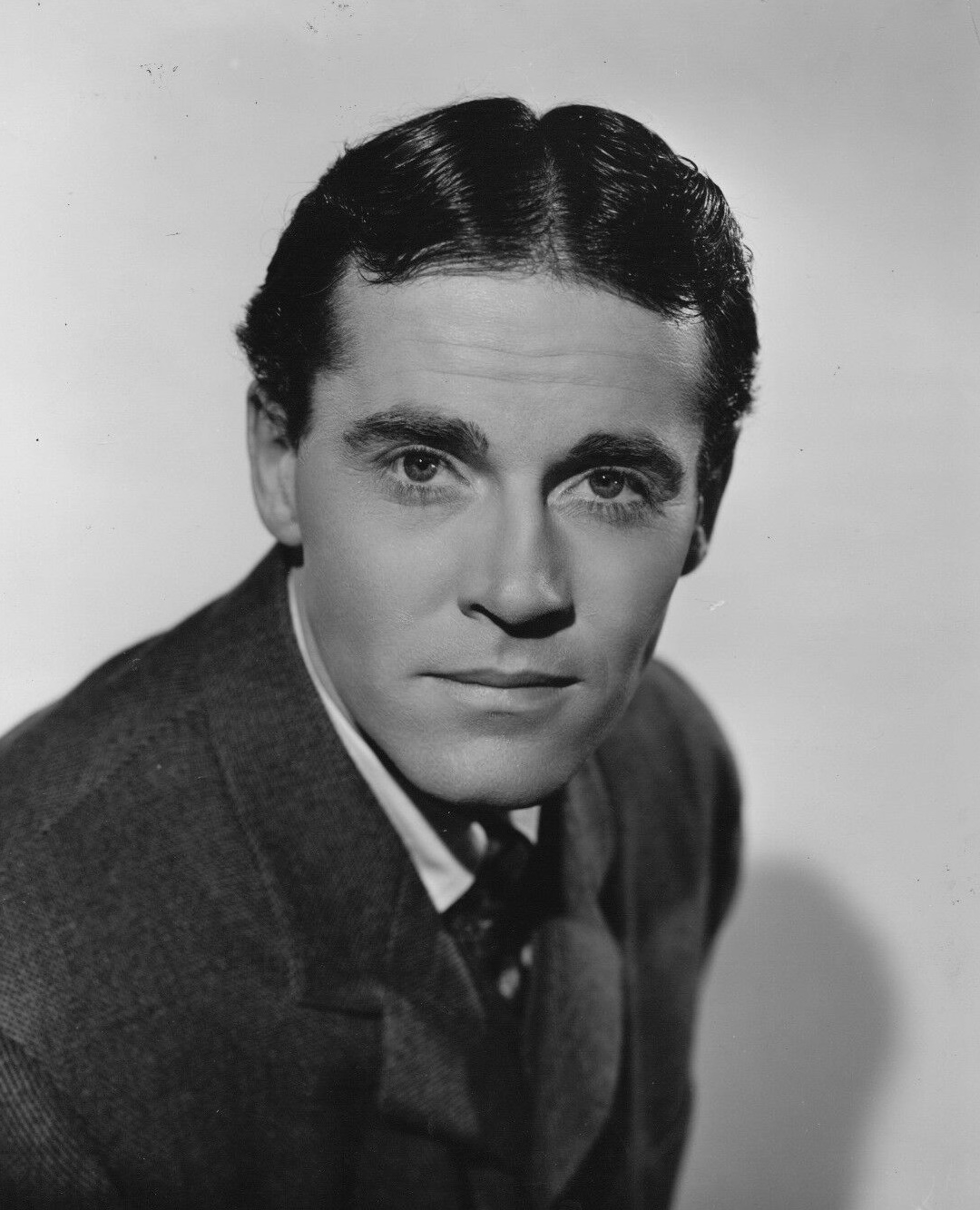
Henry Fonda won for Mister Roberts (1948)

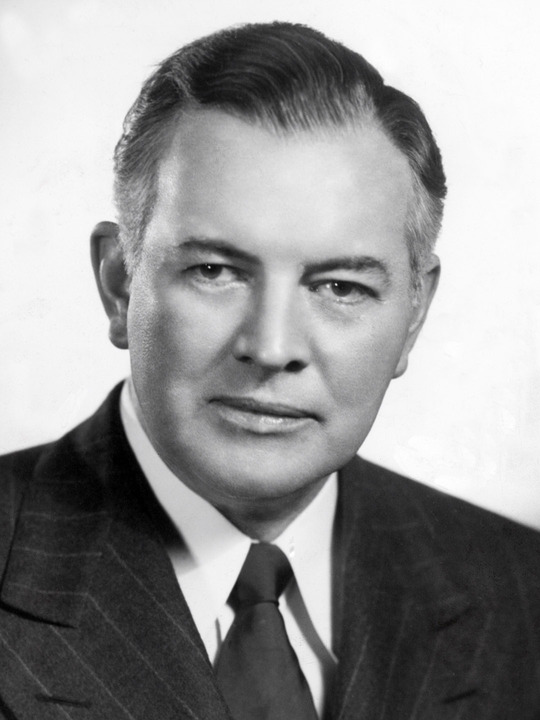
Sidney Blackmer won for Come Back, Little Sheba in 1950

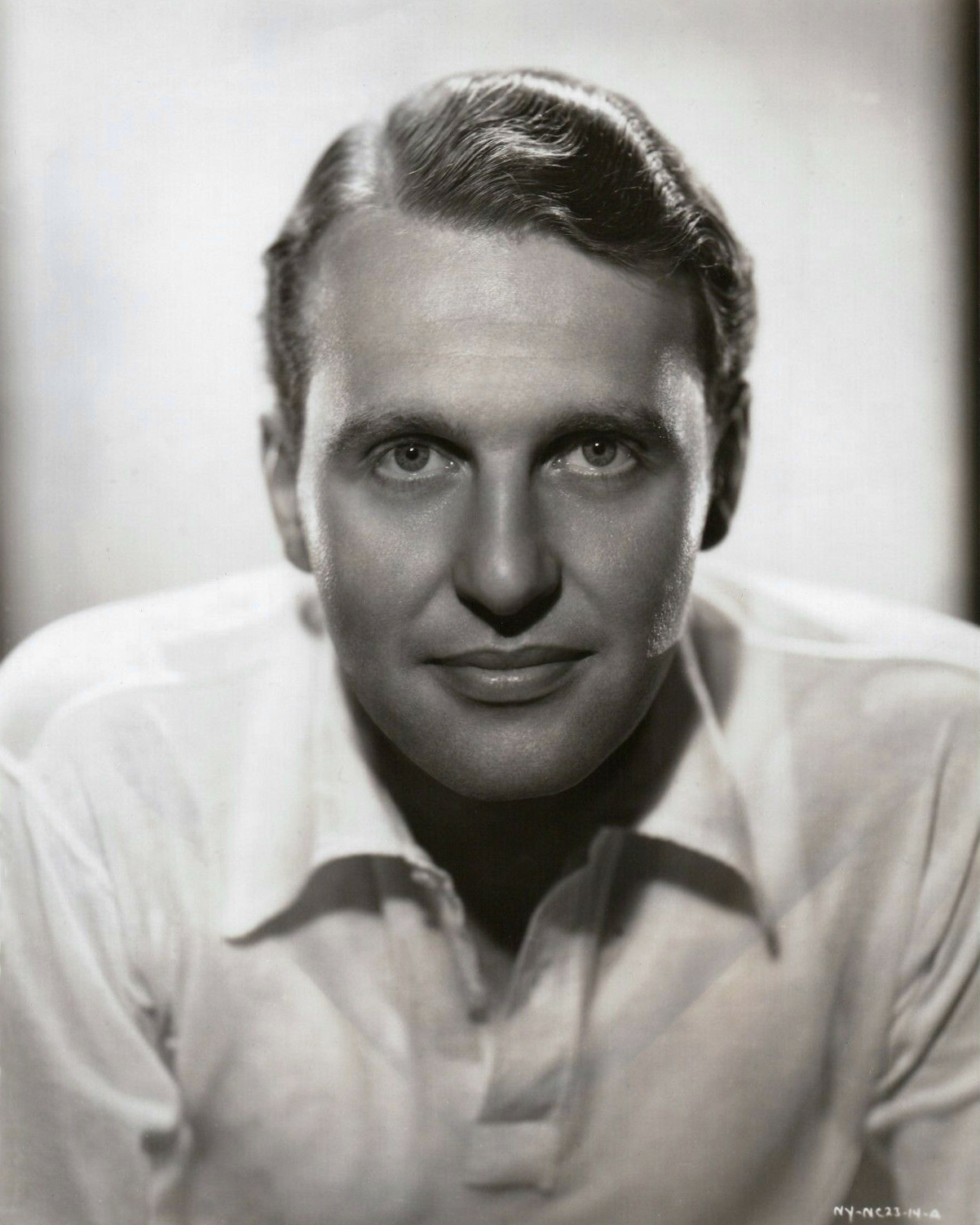
Ralph Bellamy won for Sunrise at Campobello (1958)

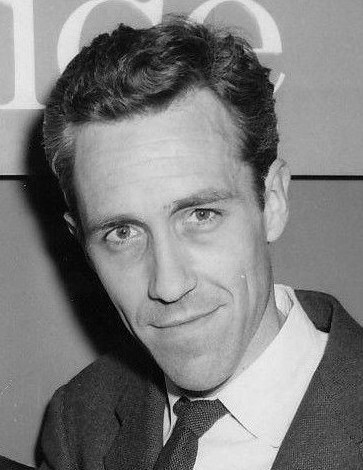
Jason Robards won for The Disenchanted (1959)

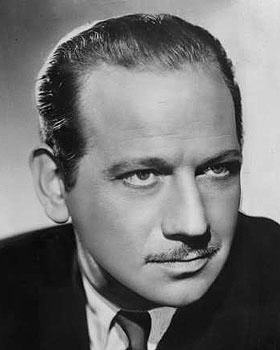
Melvyn Douglas won for The Best Man (1960)

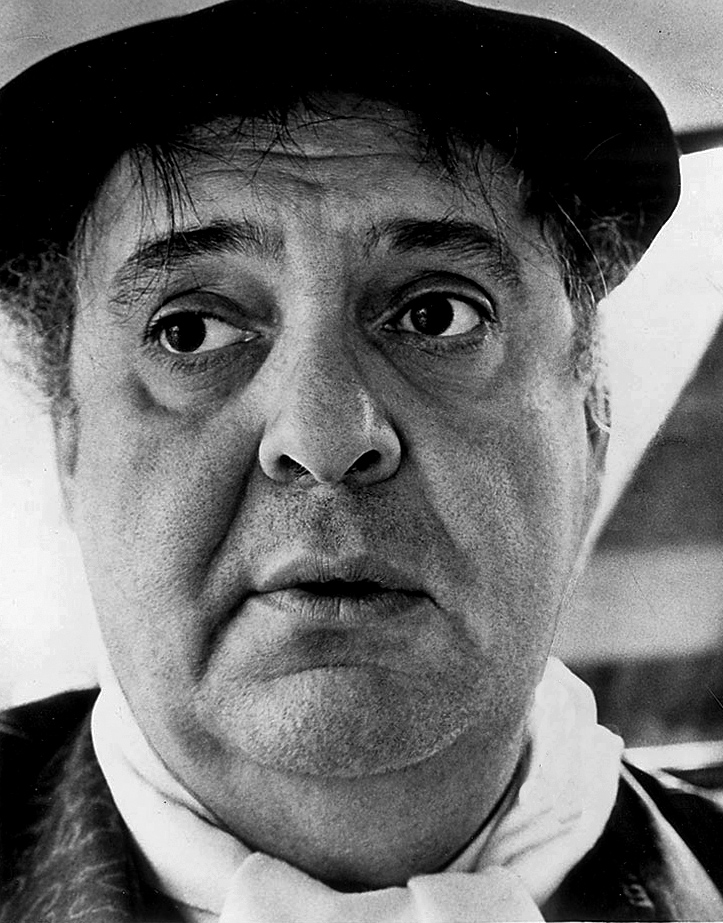
Zero Mostel won for Rhinoceros (1961)

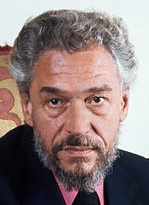
Paul Scofield won for A Man for All Seasons (1963)

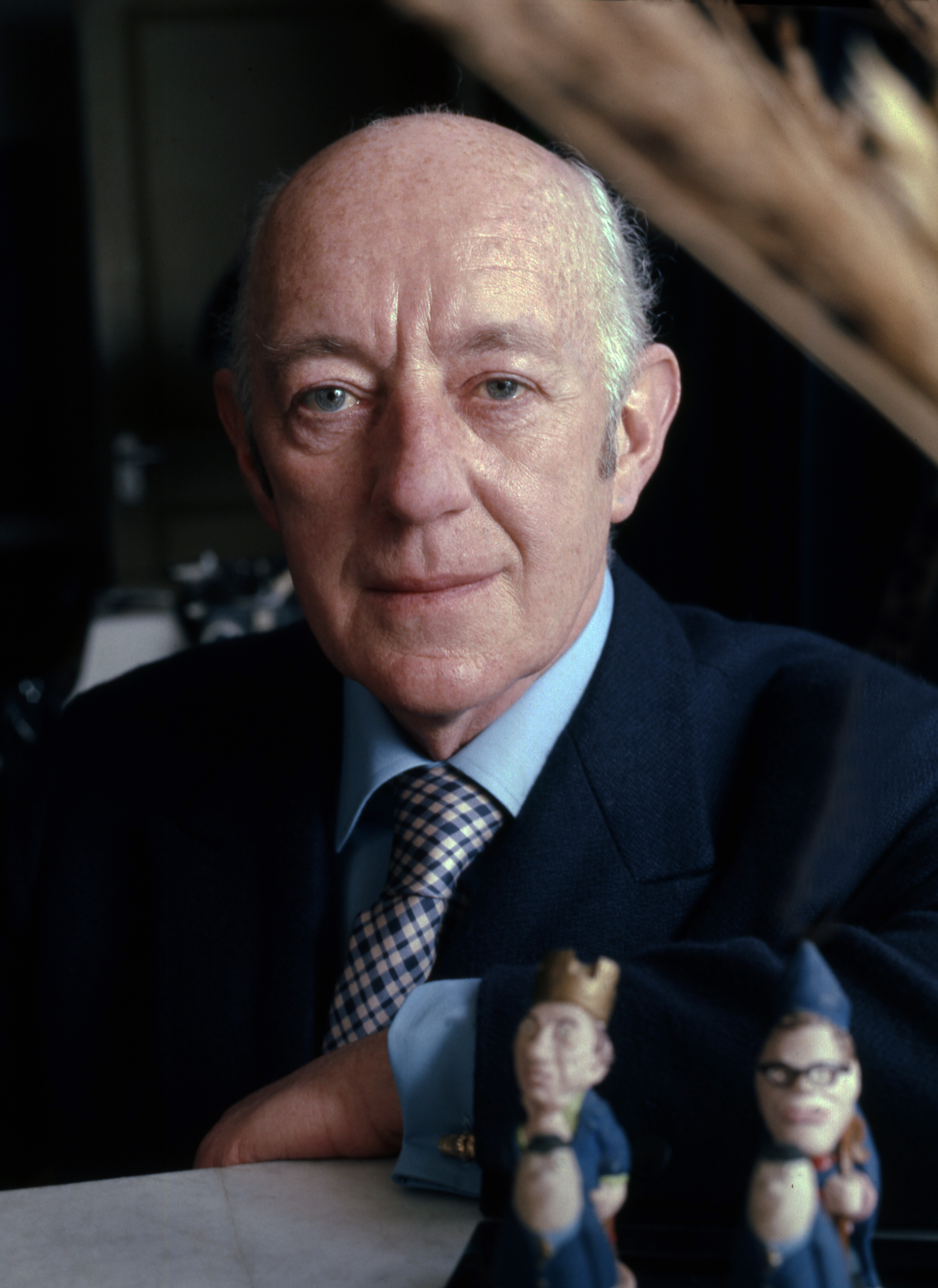
Alec Guinness won for Dylan (1964)

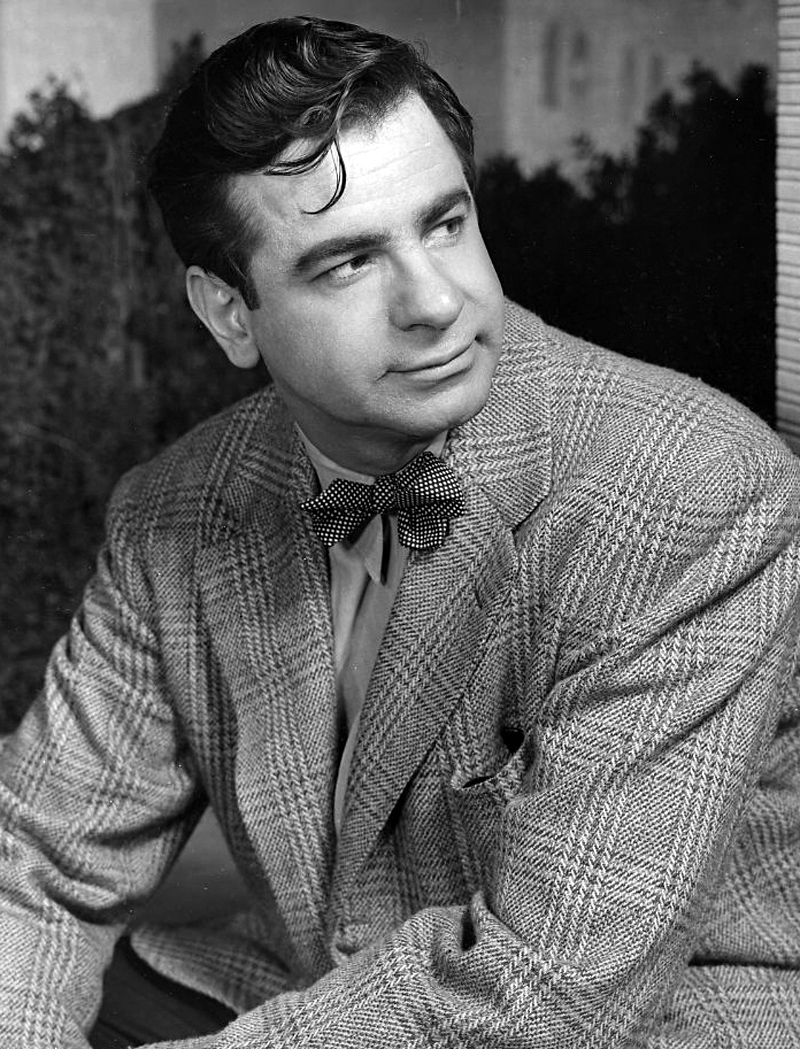
Walter Matthau won for The Odd Couple (1965)

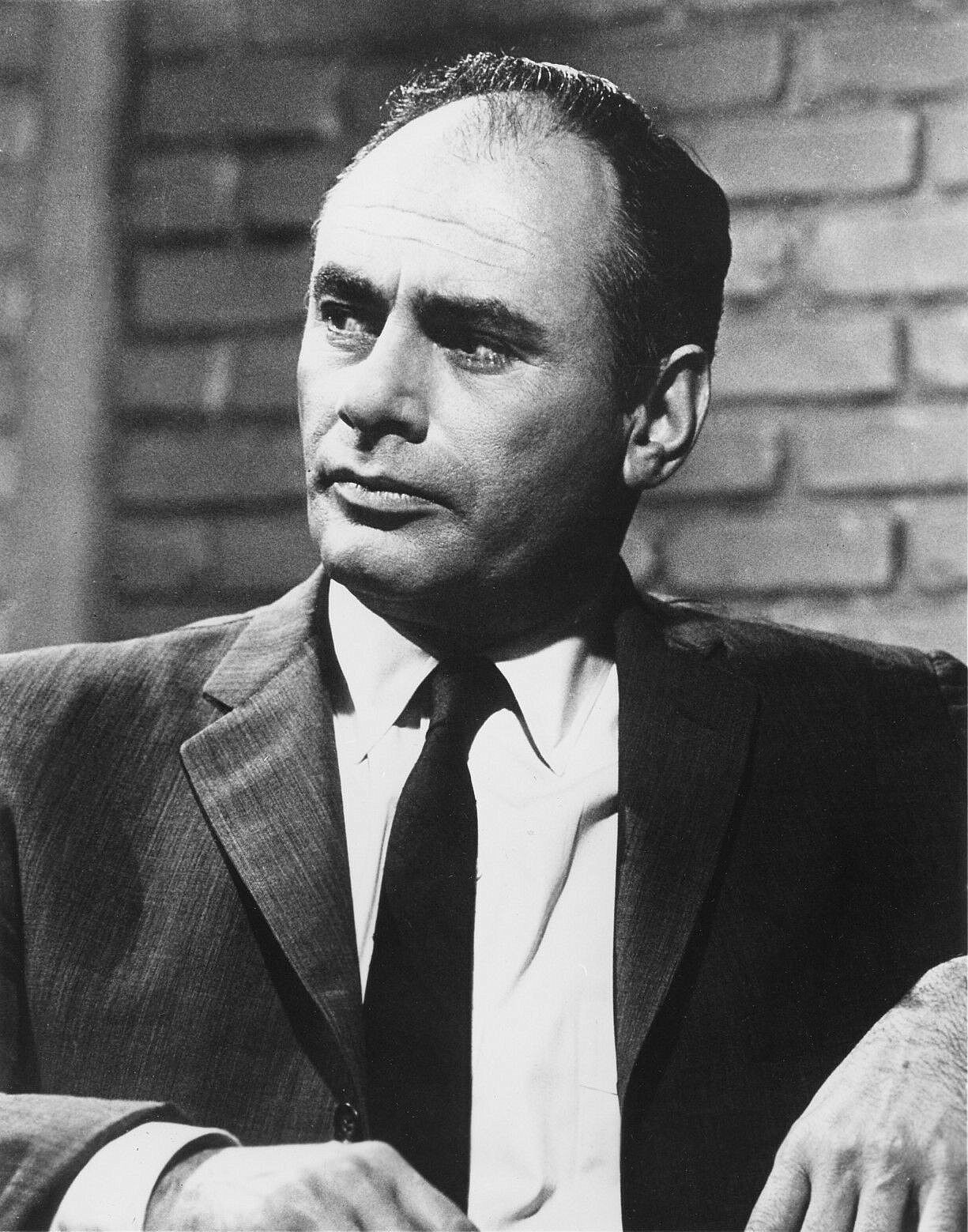
Martin Balsam won for You Know I Can't Hear You When the Water's Running (1968)

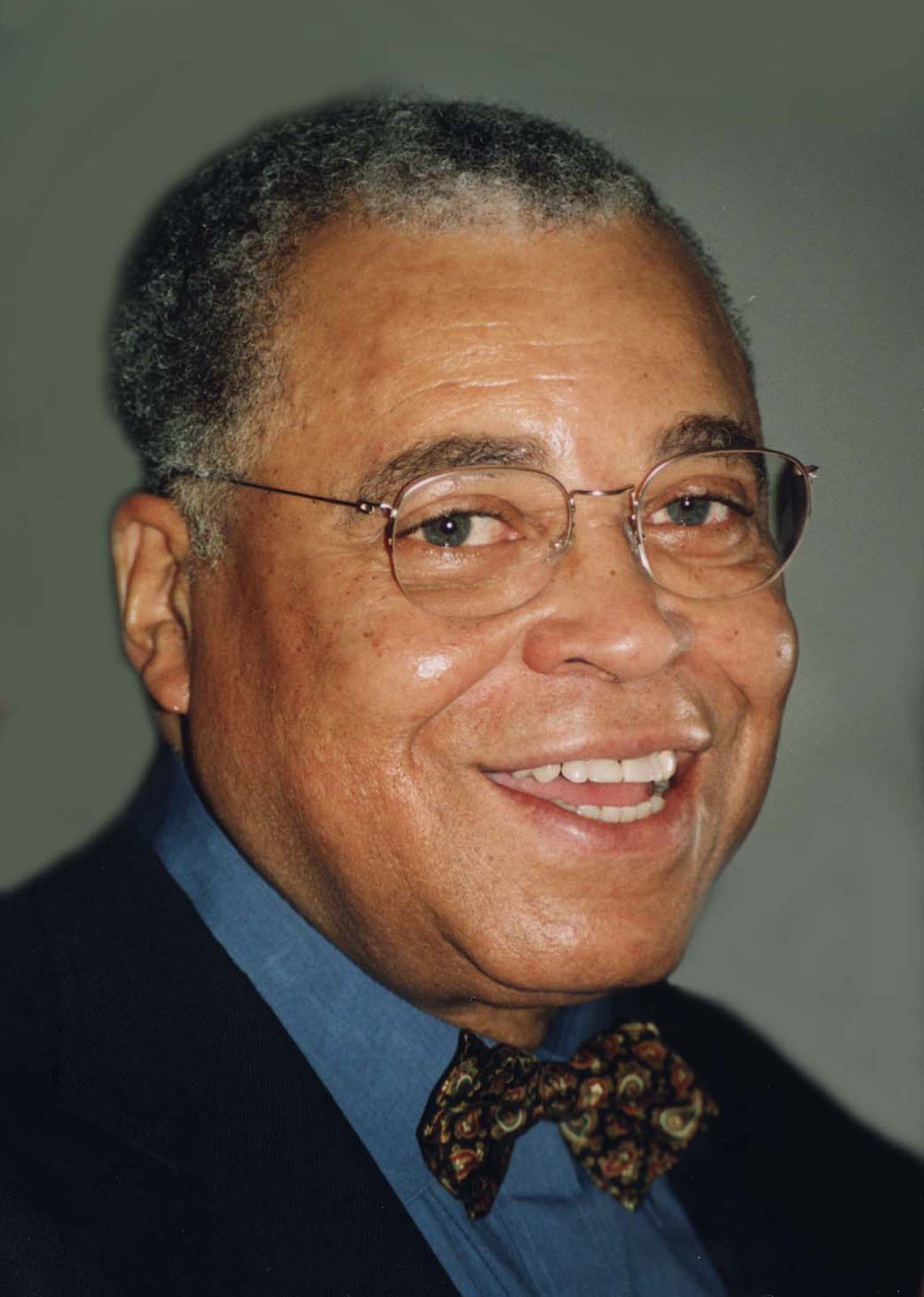
James Earl Jones won for The Great White Hope (1969) and for Fences (1987)

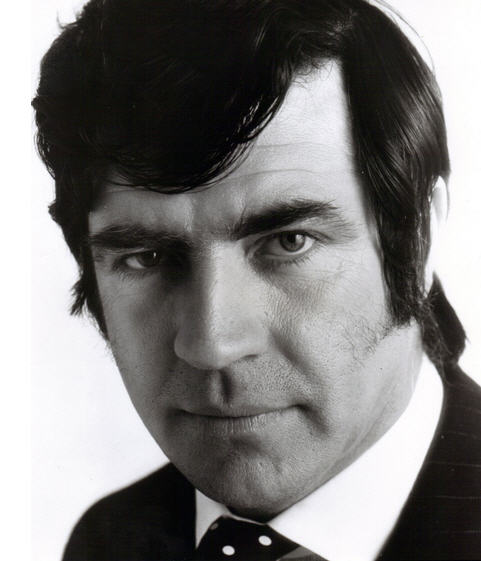
Alan Bates won twice, for Butley (1973) and Fortune's Fool (2002)

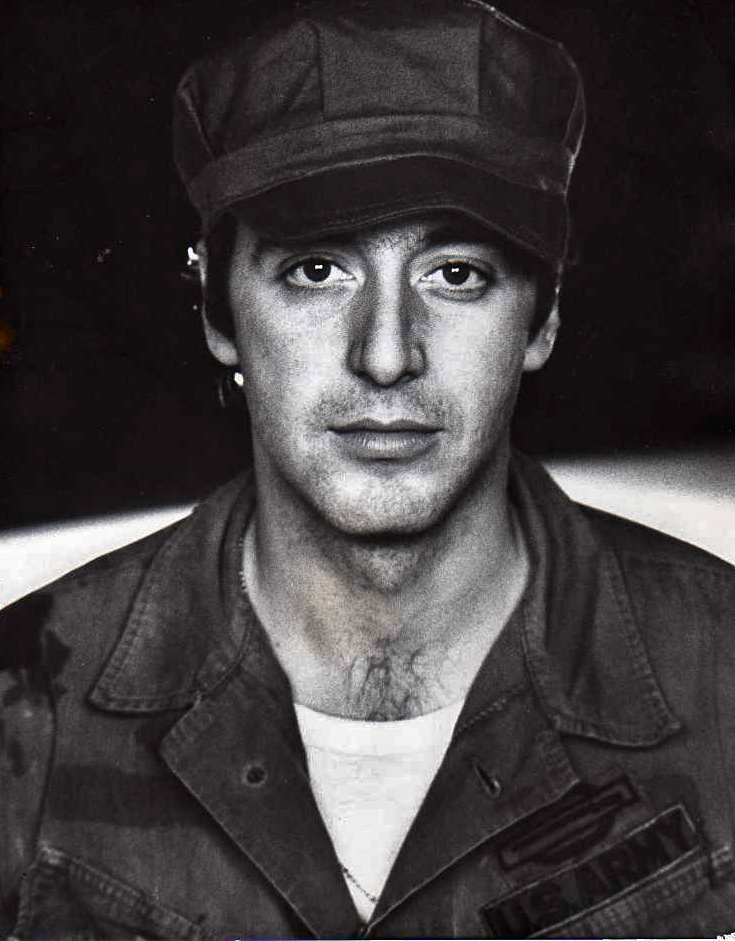
Al Pacino won for The Basic Training of Pavlo Hummel (1977)

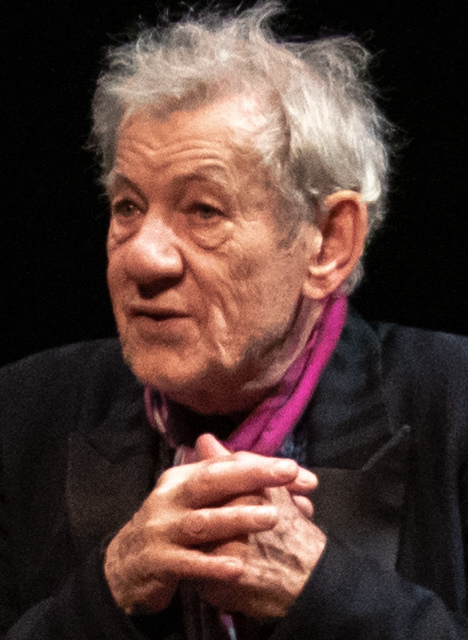
Ian McKellen won for Amadeus (1981)

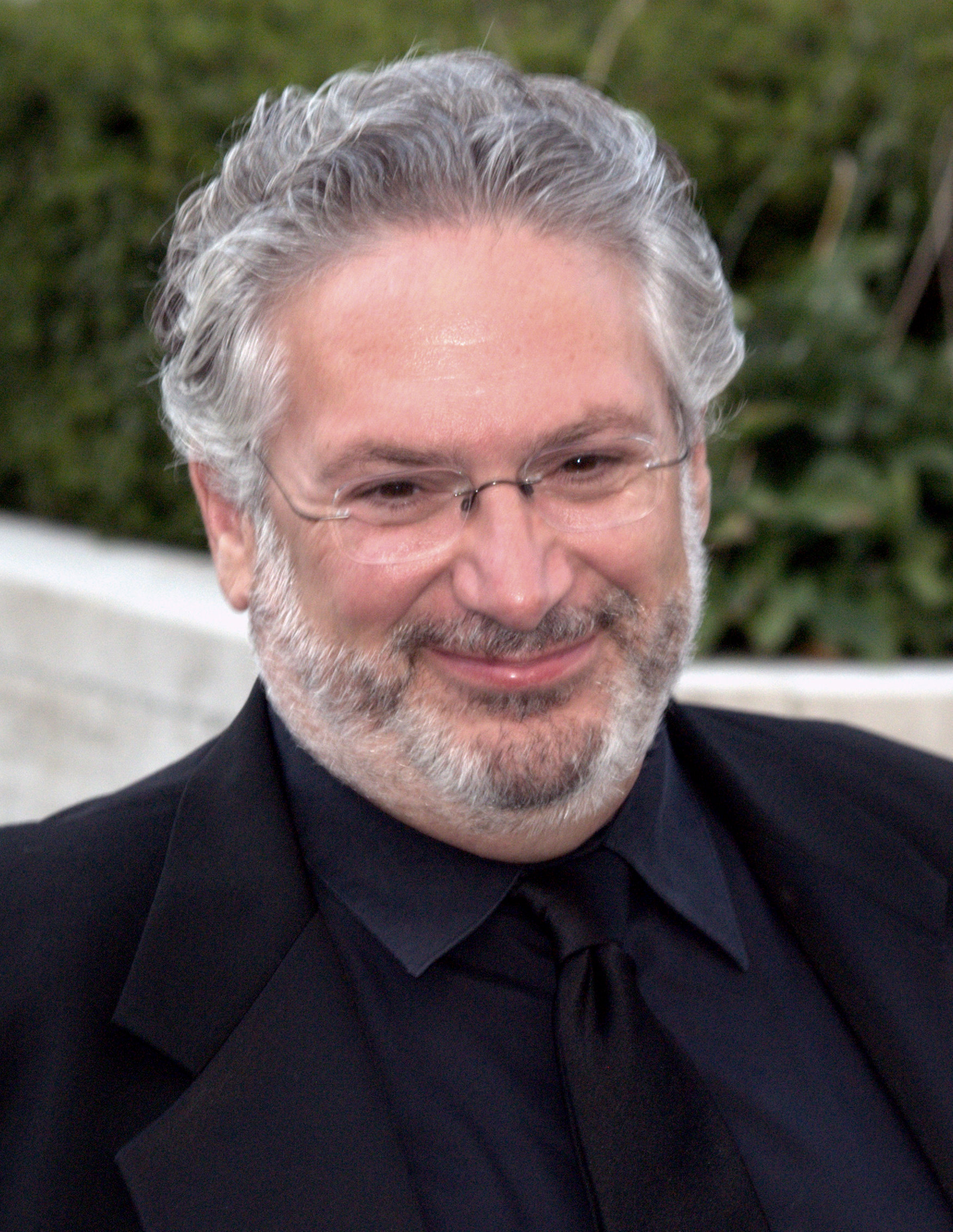
Harvey Fierstein won for Torch Song Trilogy (1983)

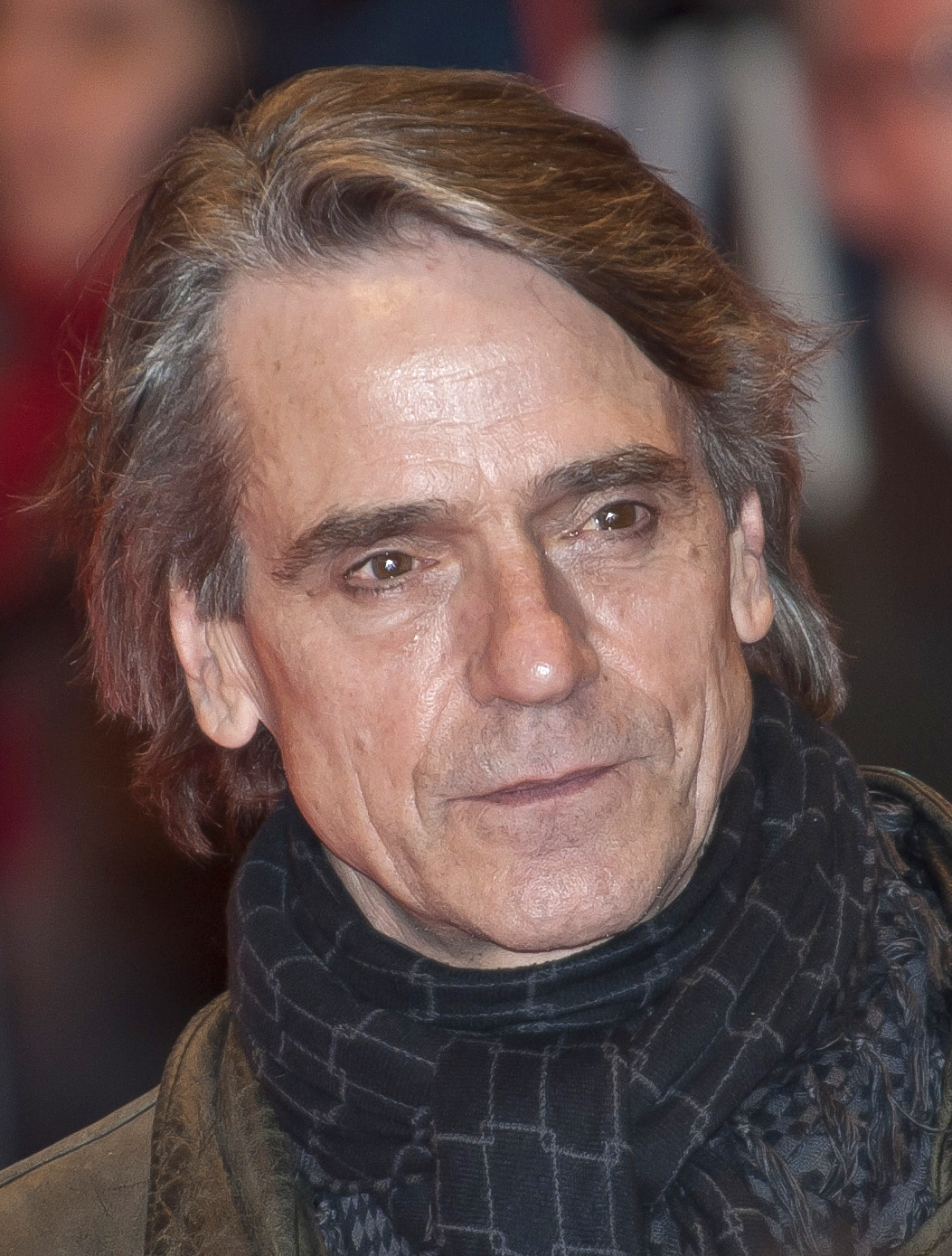
Jeremy Irons won for The Real Thing (1984)

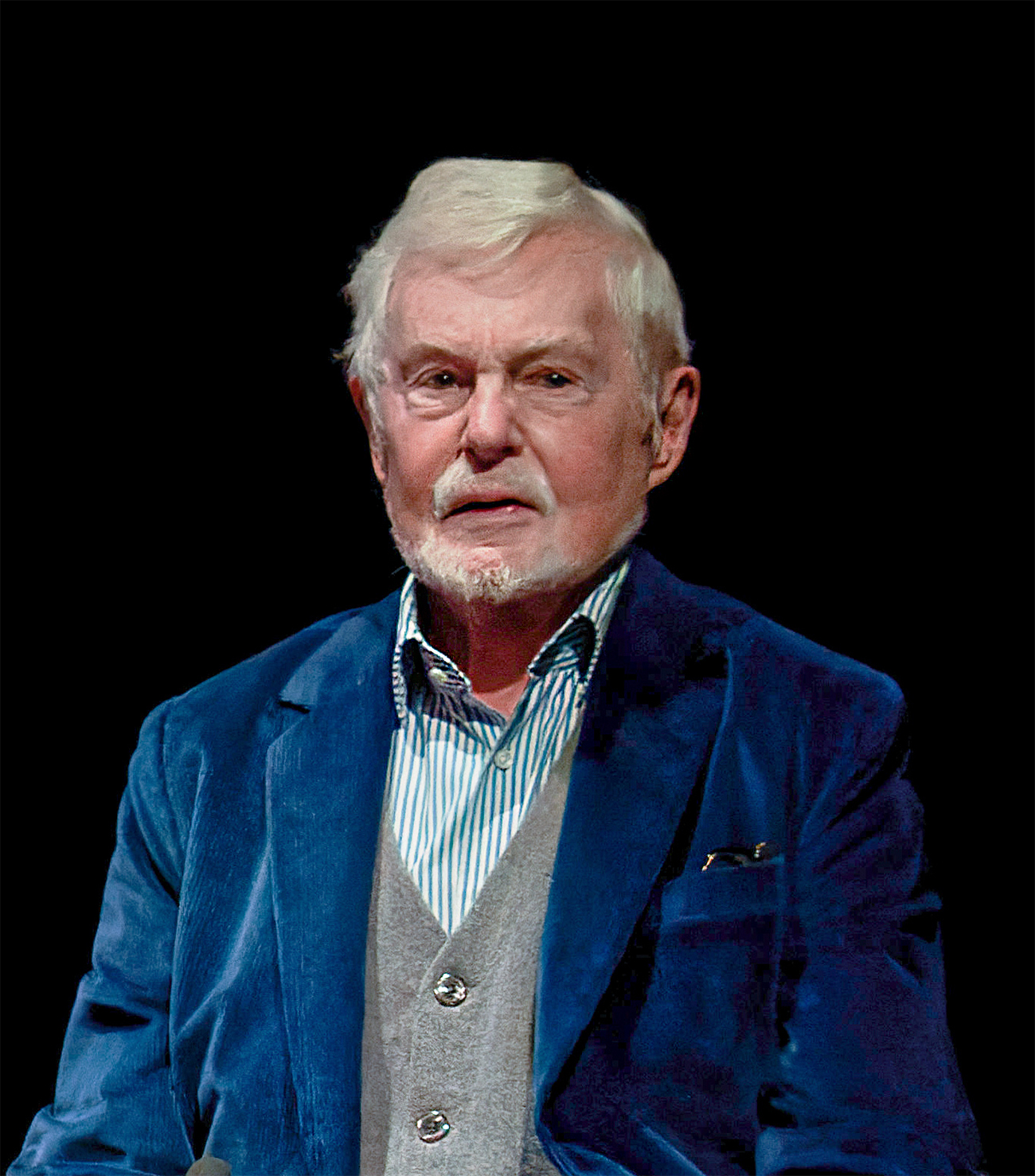
Derek Jacobi won for Much Ado About Nothing (1985)

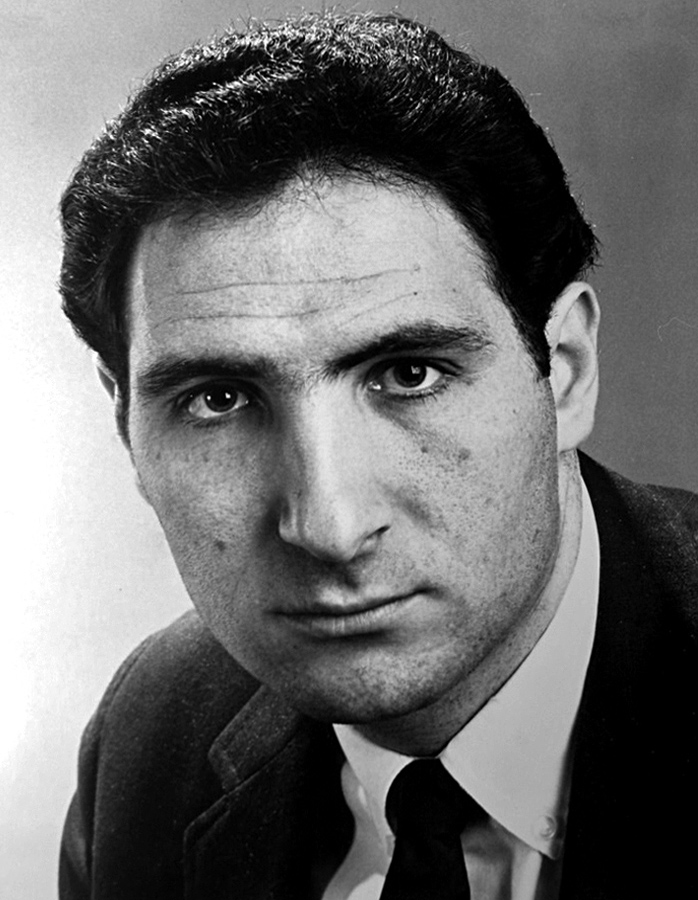
Judd Hirsch won twice for I'm Not Rappaport (1986) and Conversations with My Father (1992)

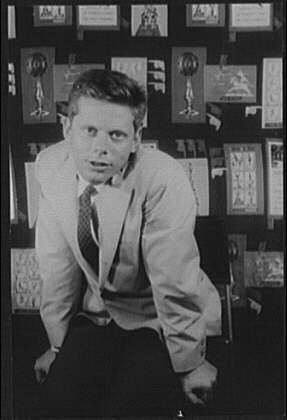
Robert Morse won Tru (1990)

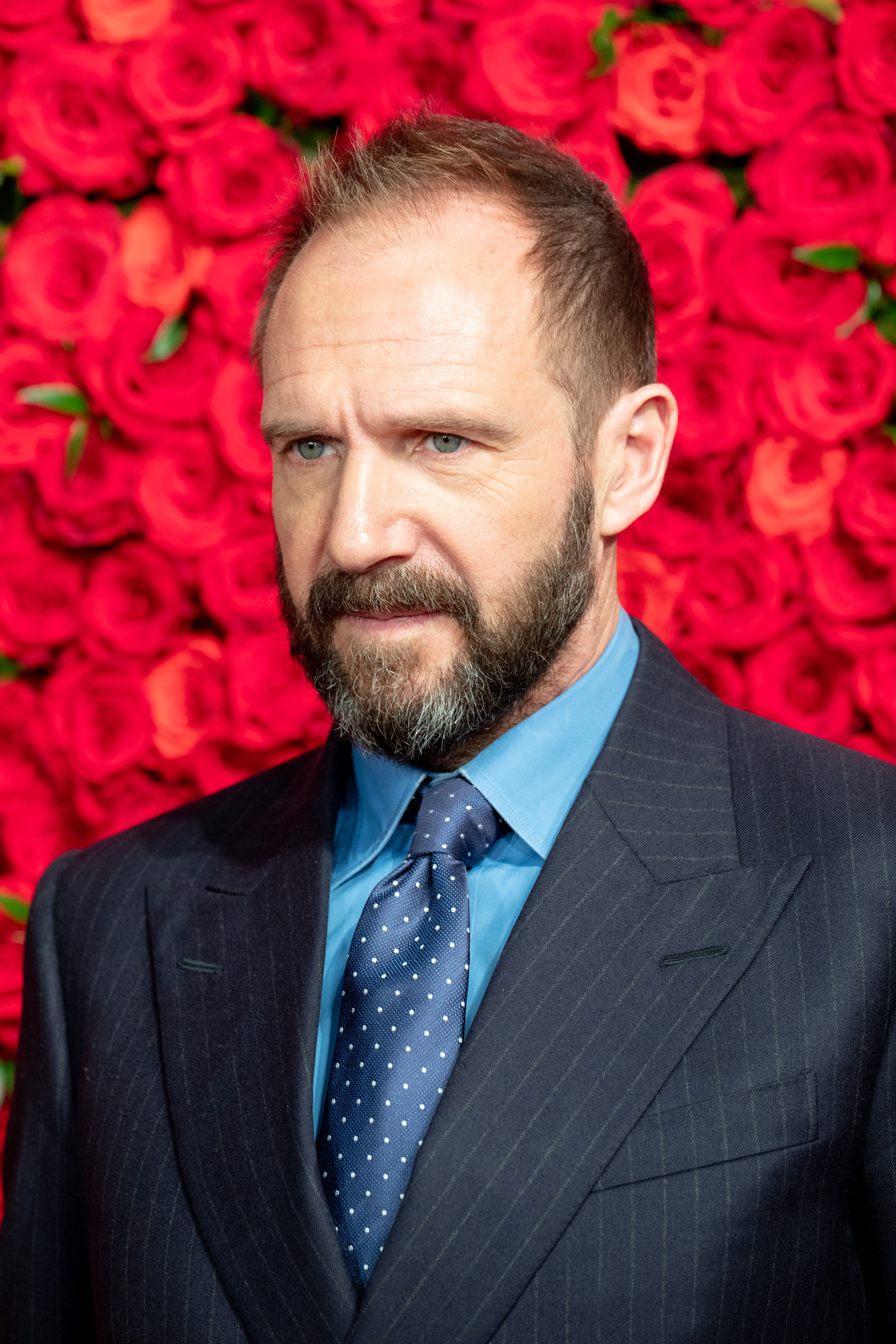
Ralph Fiennes for Hamlet (1995)

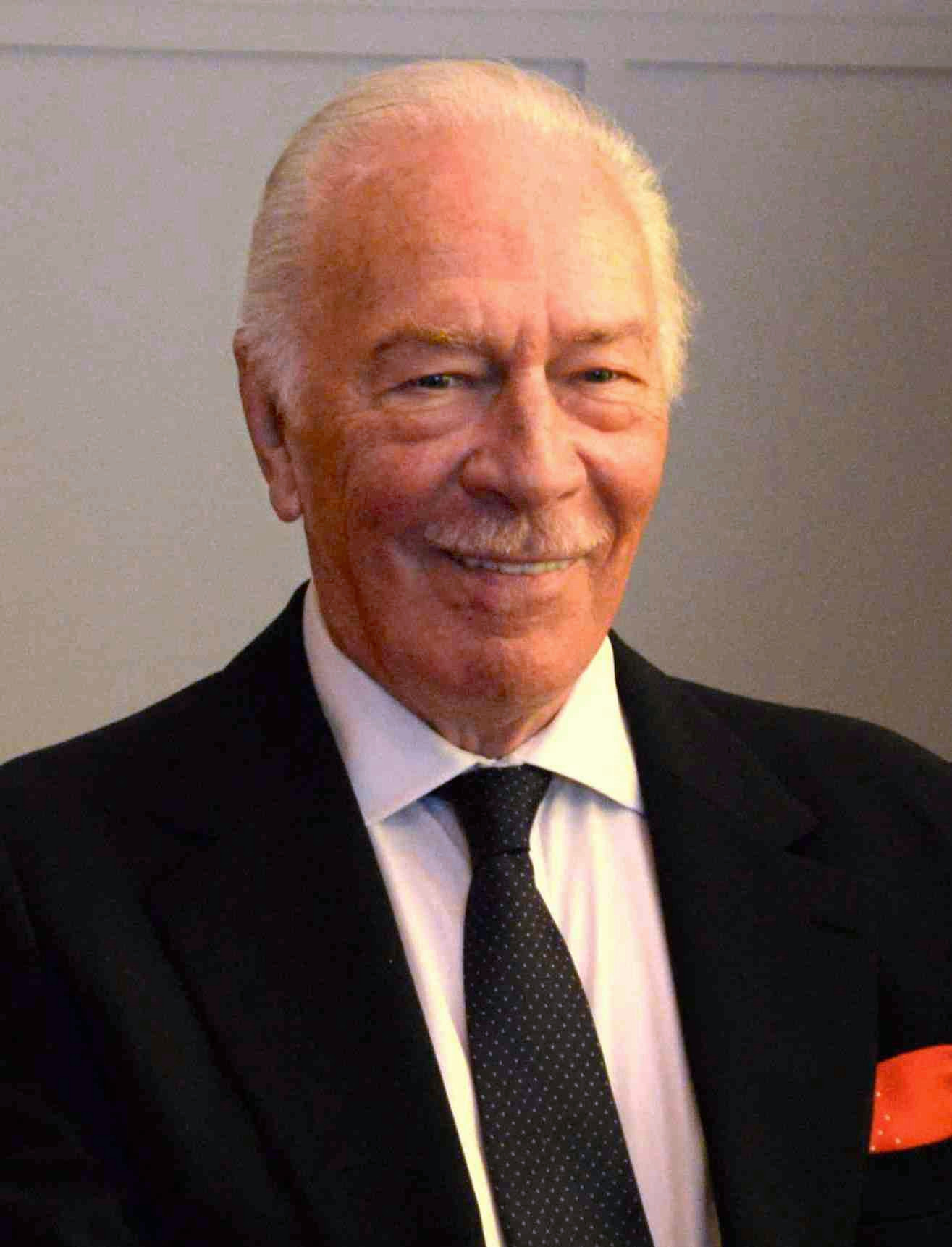
Christopher Plummer won for Barrymore (1997)

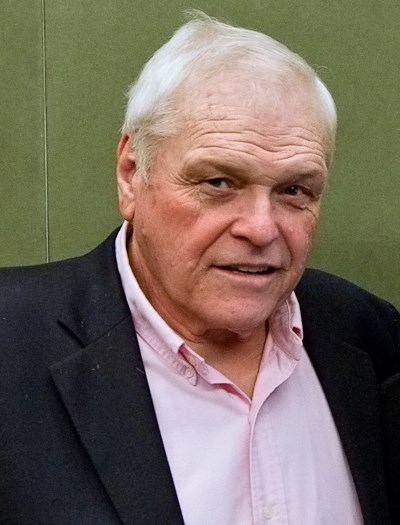
Brian Dennehy won twice for Death of a Salesman (1999) and Long Day's Journey into Night (2003)

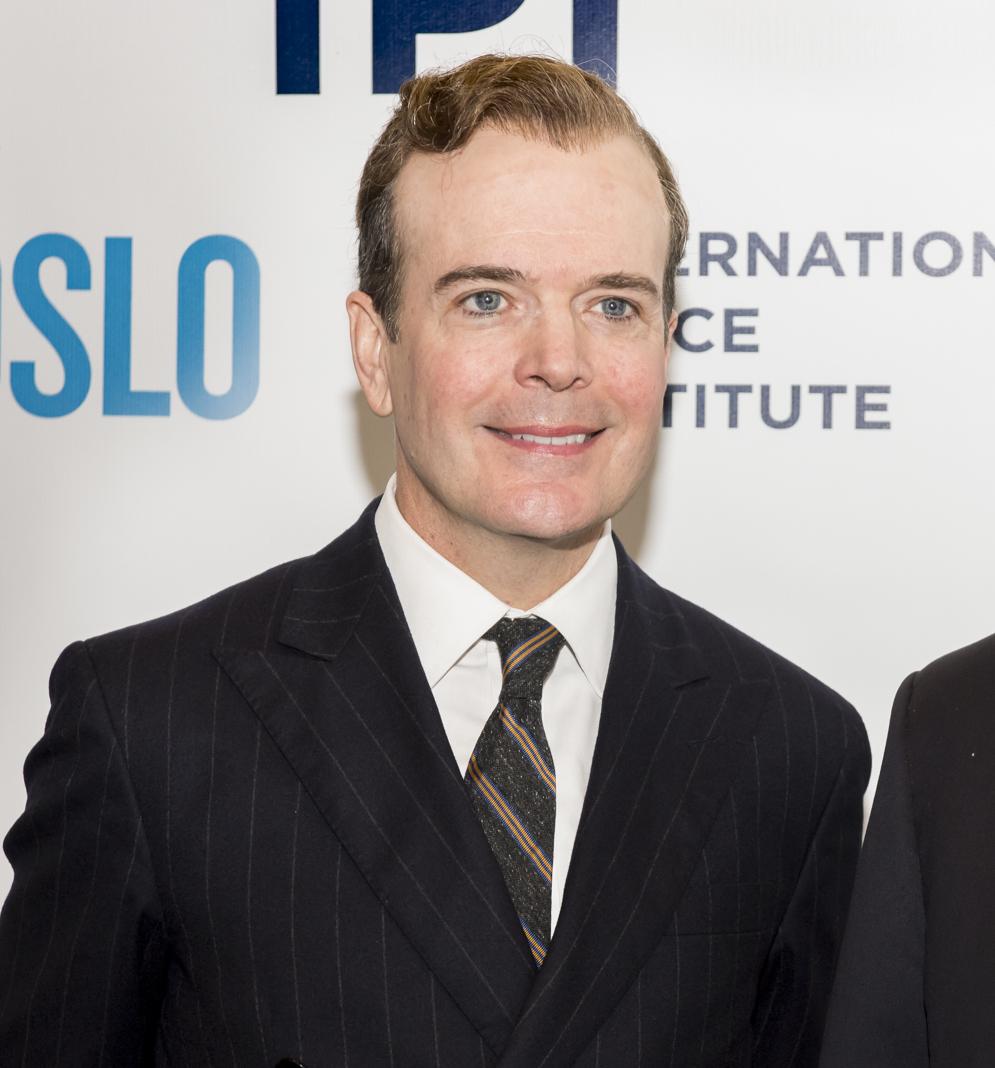
Jefferson Mays won for I Am My Own Wife in 2004

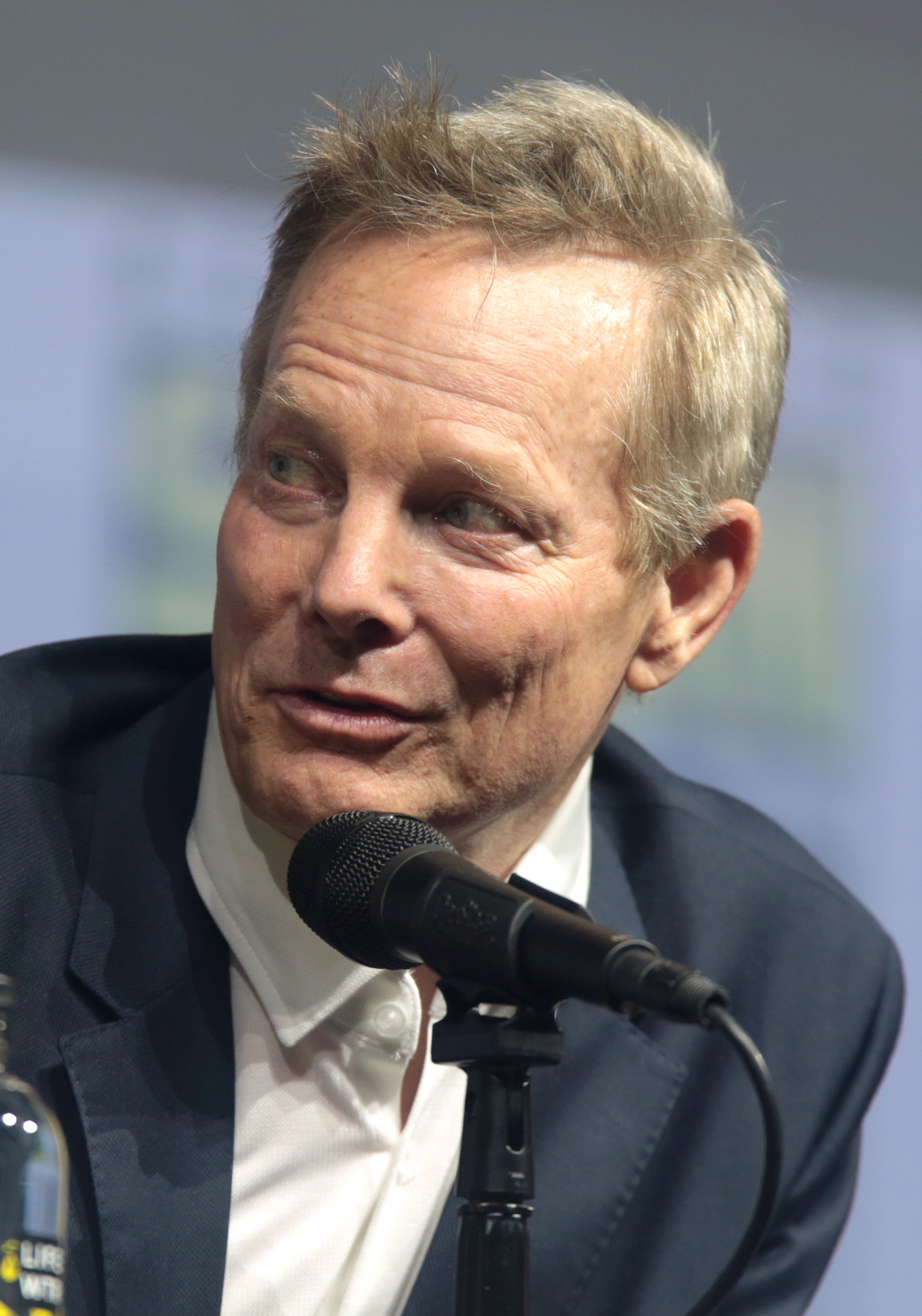
Bill Irwin won for Who's Afraid of Virginia Woolf? (2005)

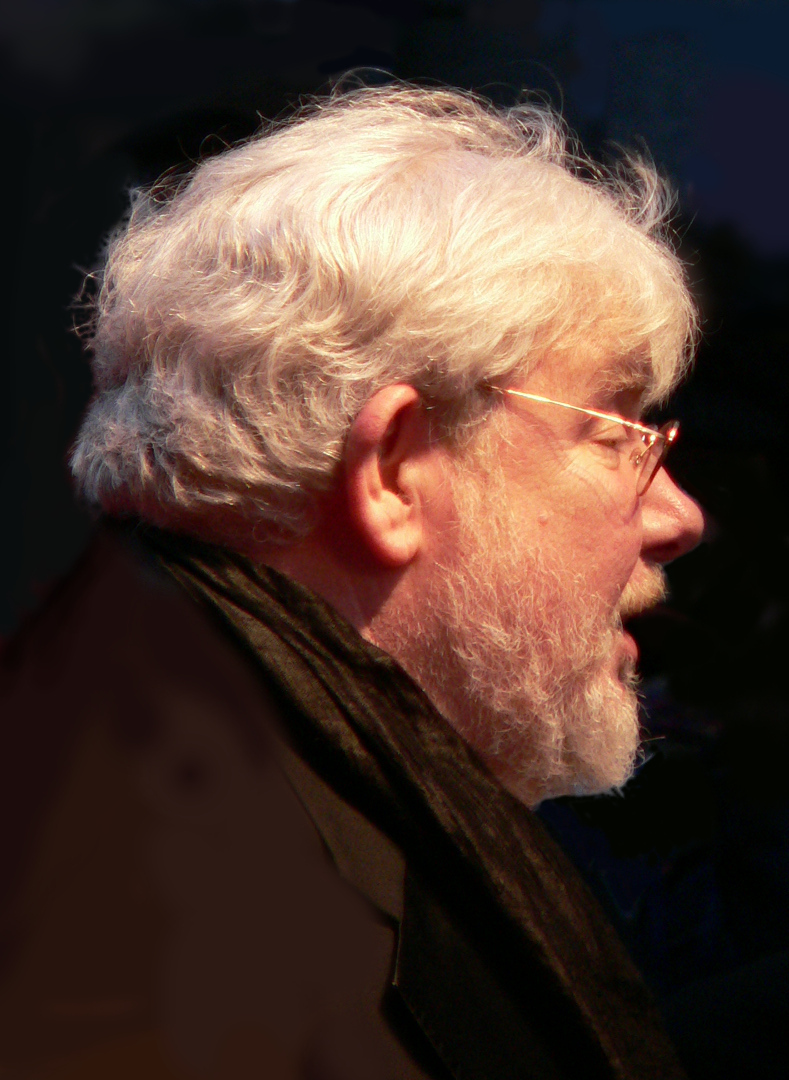
Richard Griffiths won for The History Boys in 2006

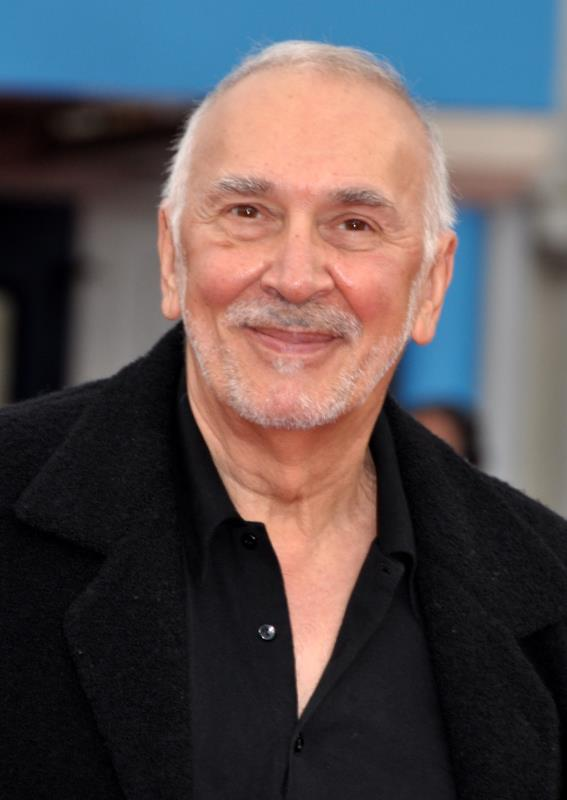
Frank Langella won twice for his roles in Frost/Nixon (2007) and The Father (2016)

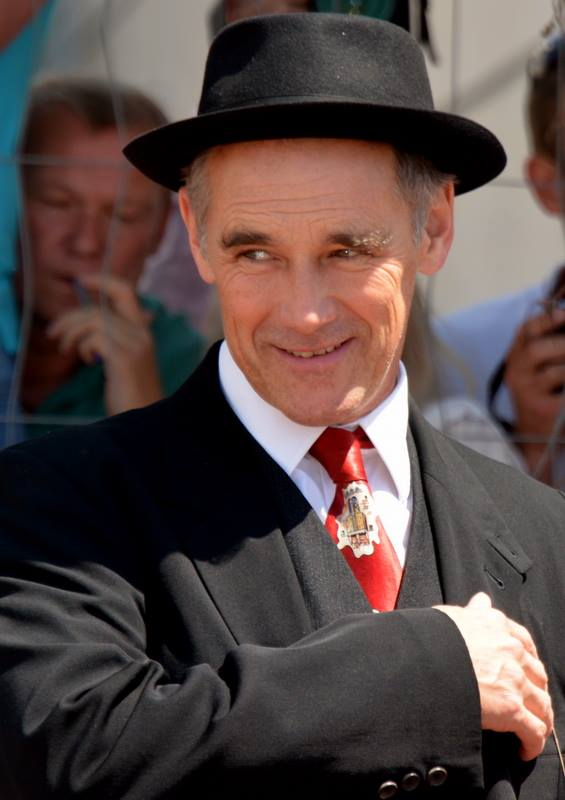
Mark Rylance won for Boeing-Boeing (2008), and Jerusalem (2011)

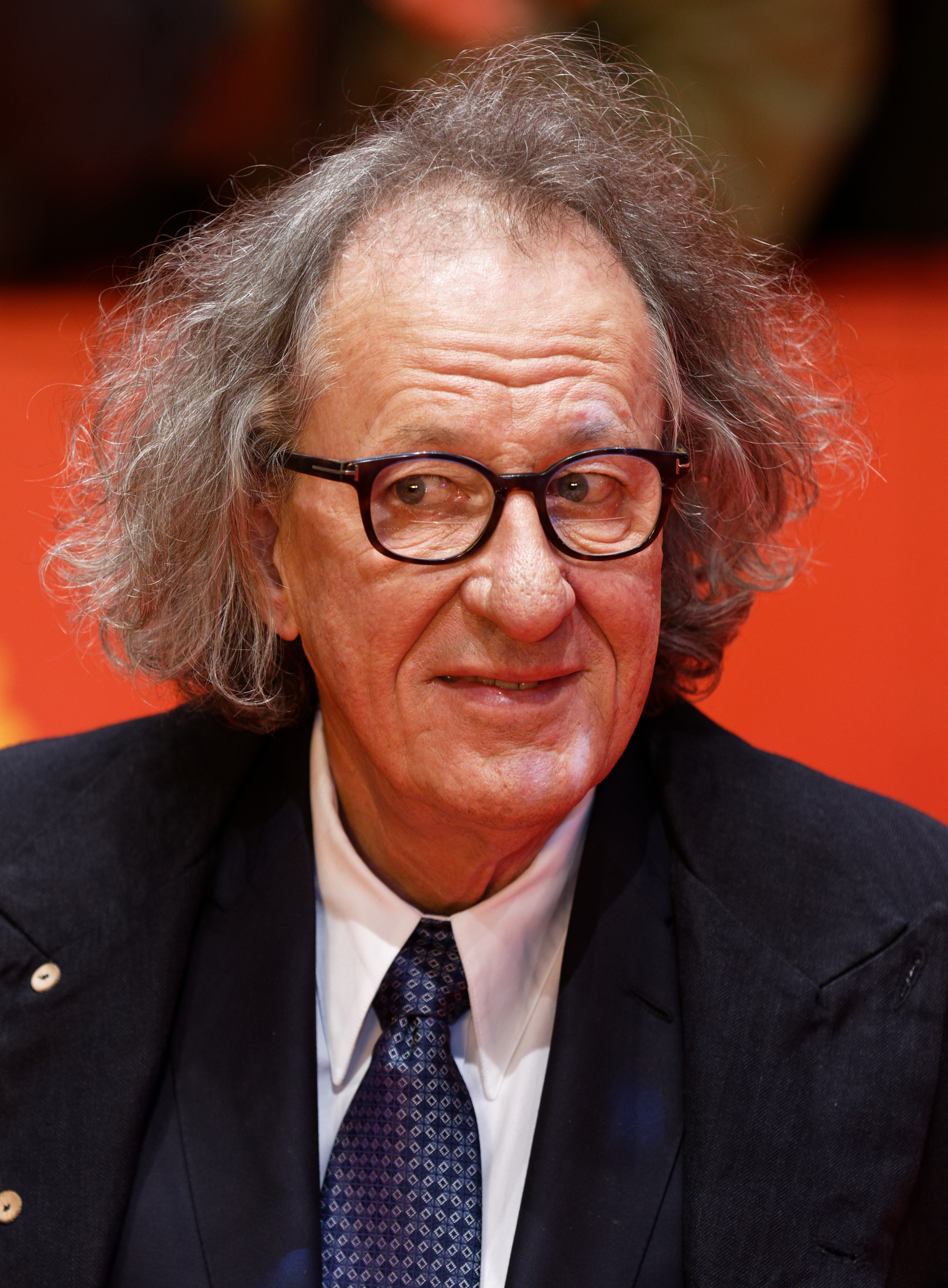
Geoffrey Rush won for Exit the King in 2009

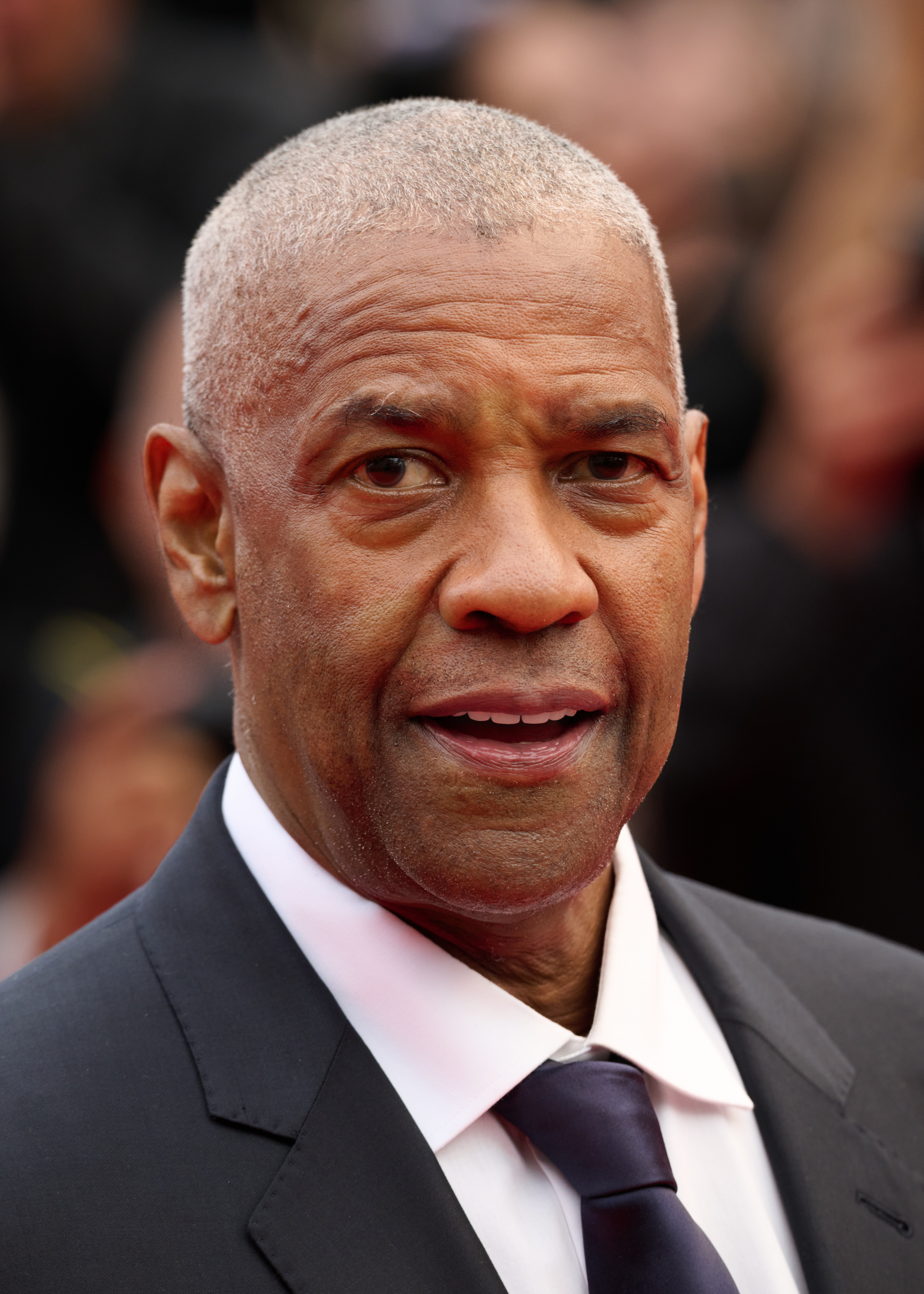
Denzel Washington won for Fences (2010)

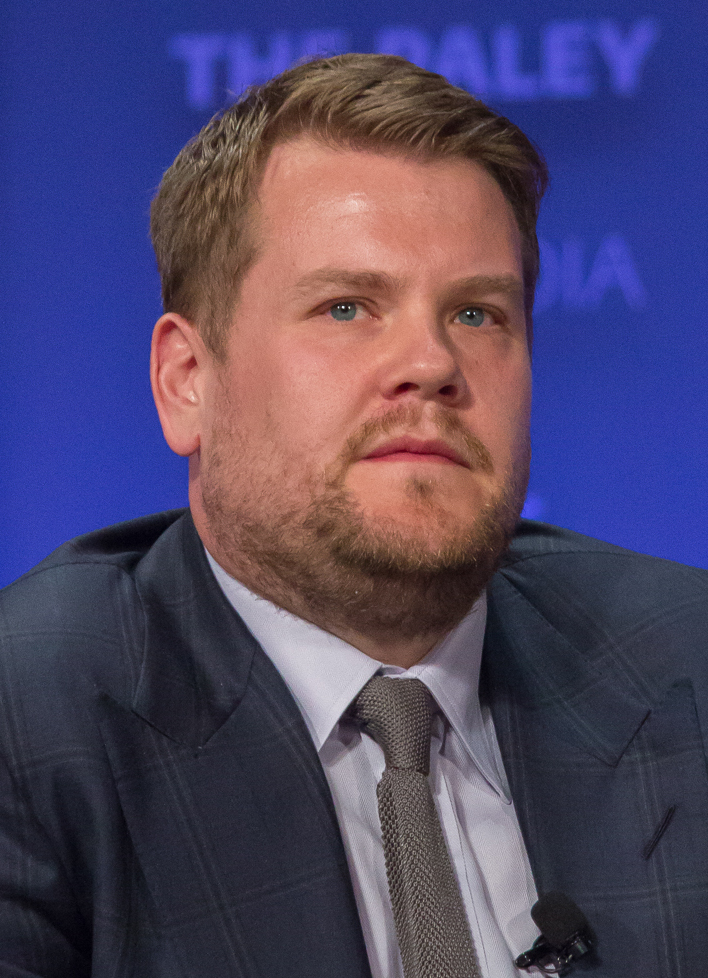
James Corden won for One Man, Two Guvnors (2012)

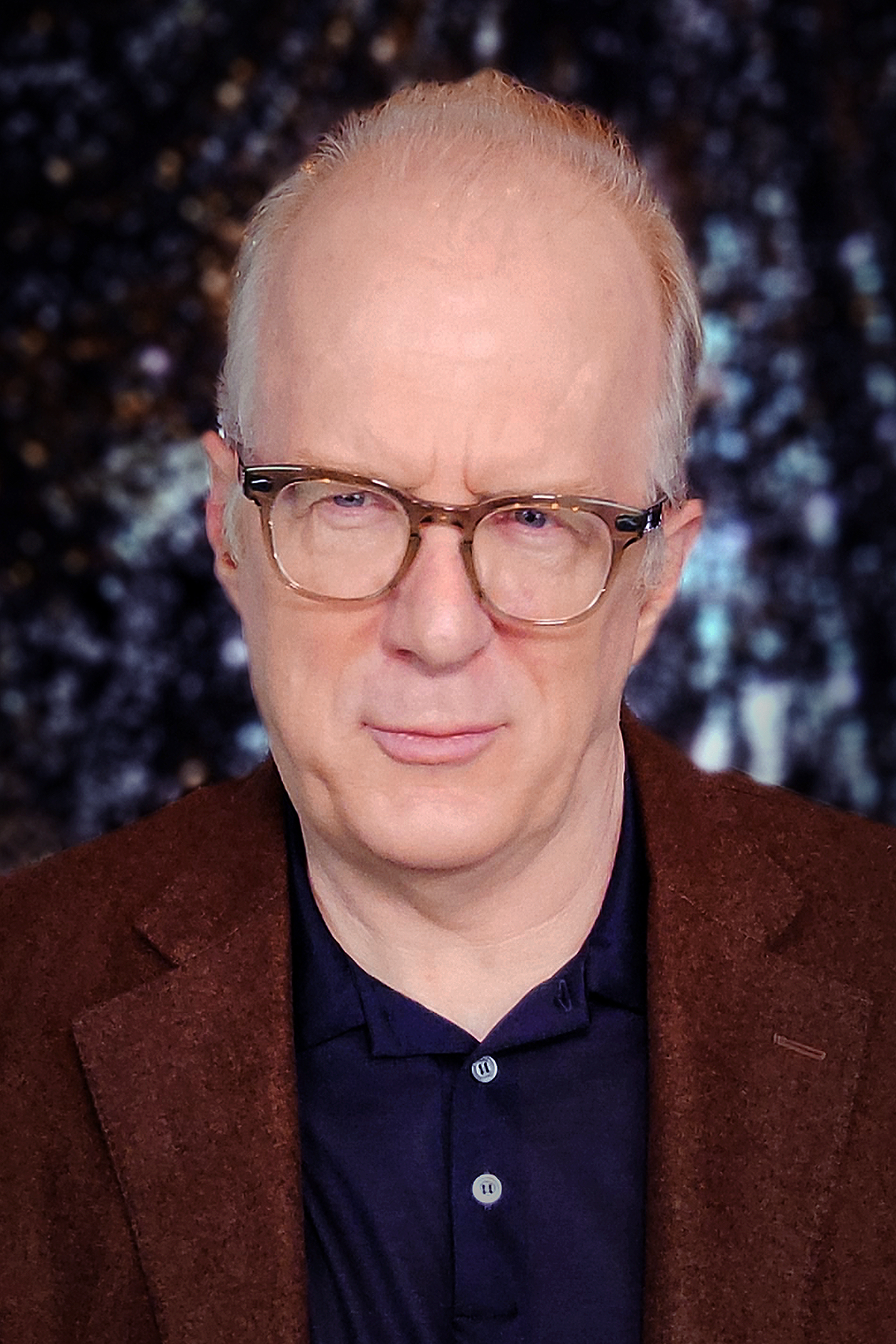
Tracy Letts won for Who's Afraid of Virginia Woolf? (2013)

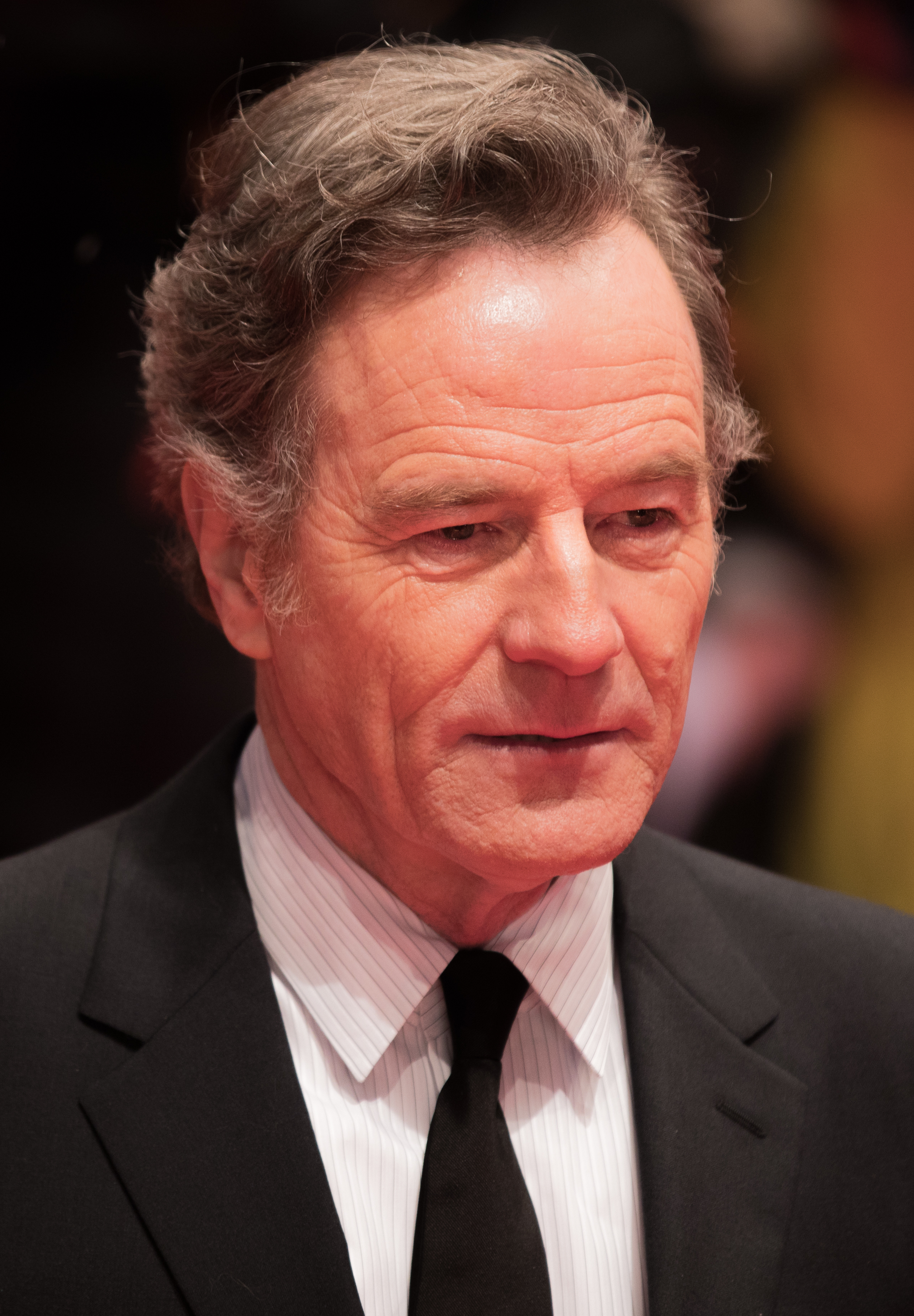
Bryan Cranston won twice, for All the Way (2014) and Network (2019)

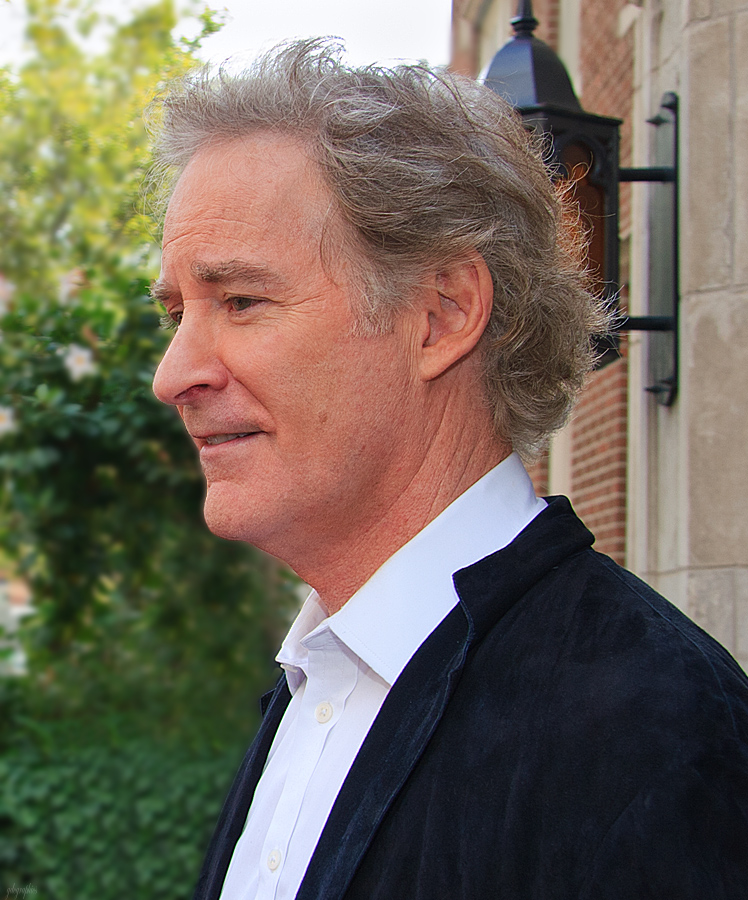
Kevin Kline won for Present Laughter in 2017

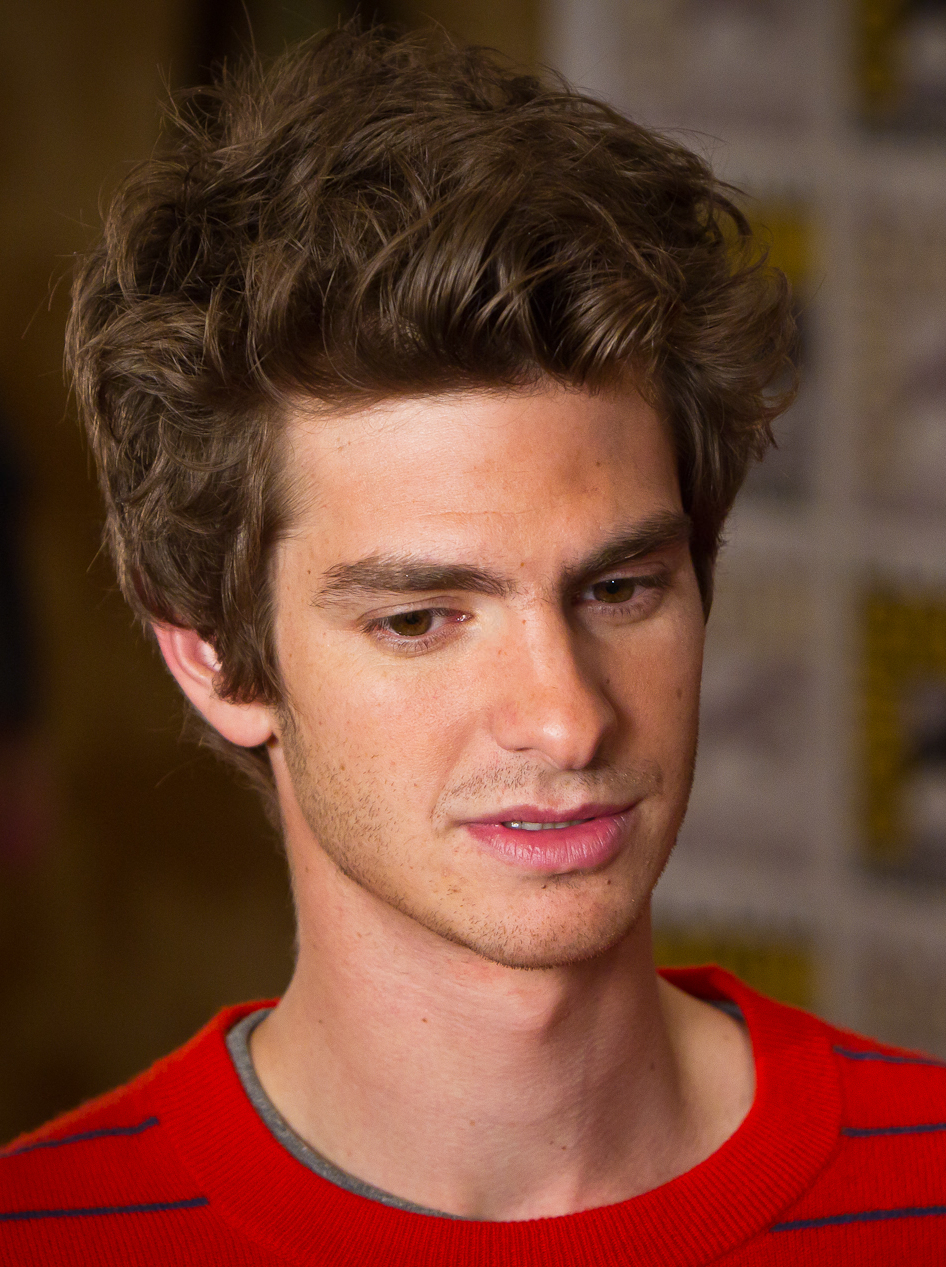
Andrew Garfield won for Angels in America (2018)

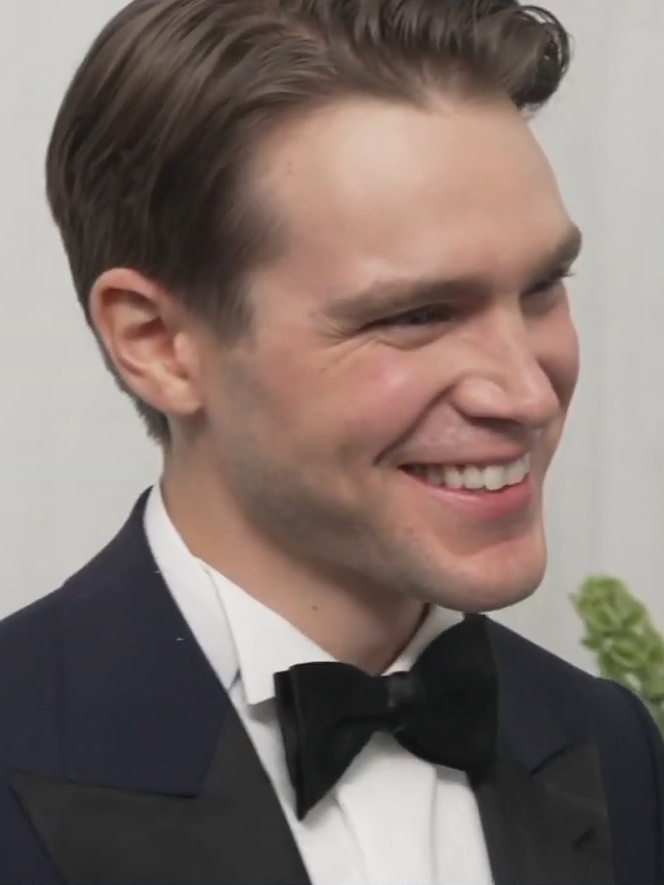
Andrew Burnap won for The Inheritance (2020)

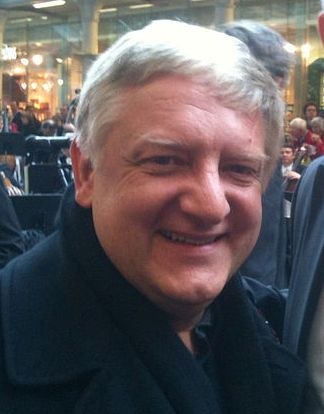
Simon Russell Beale won for The Lehman Trilogy (2021)

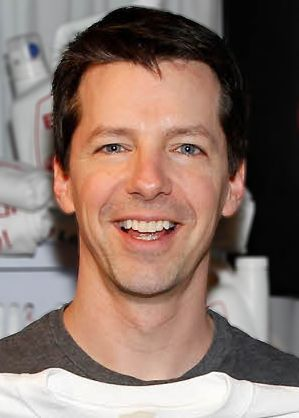
Sean Hayes won for Good Night, Oscar (2023)

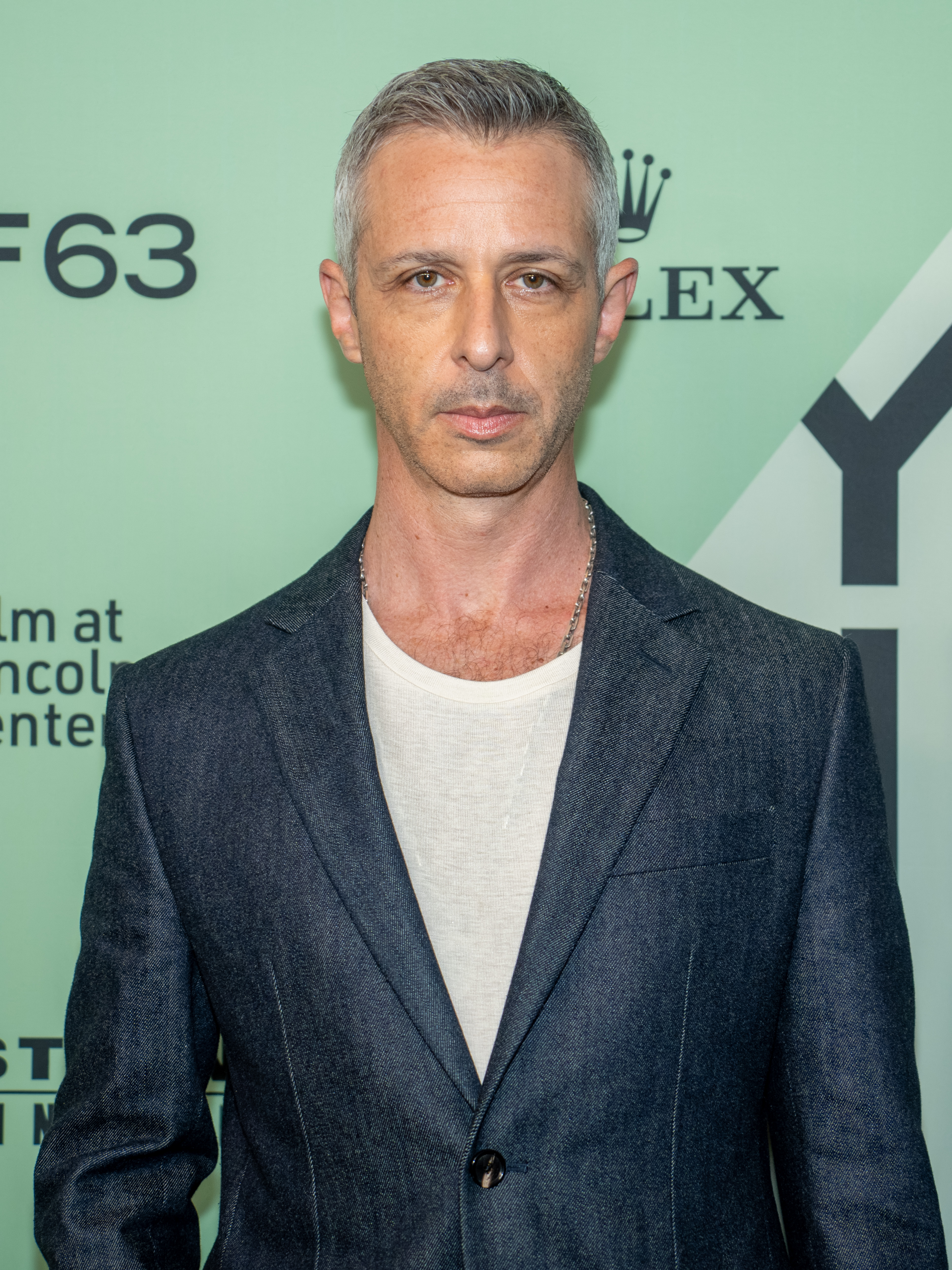
Jeremy Strong won for An Enemy of the People (2024)

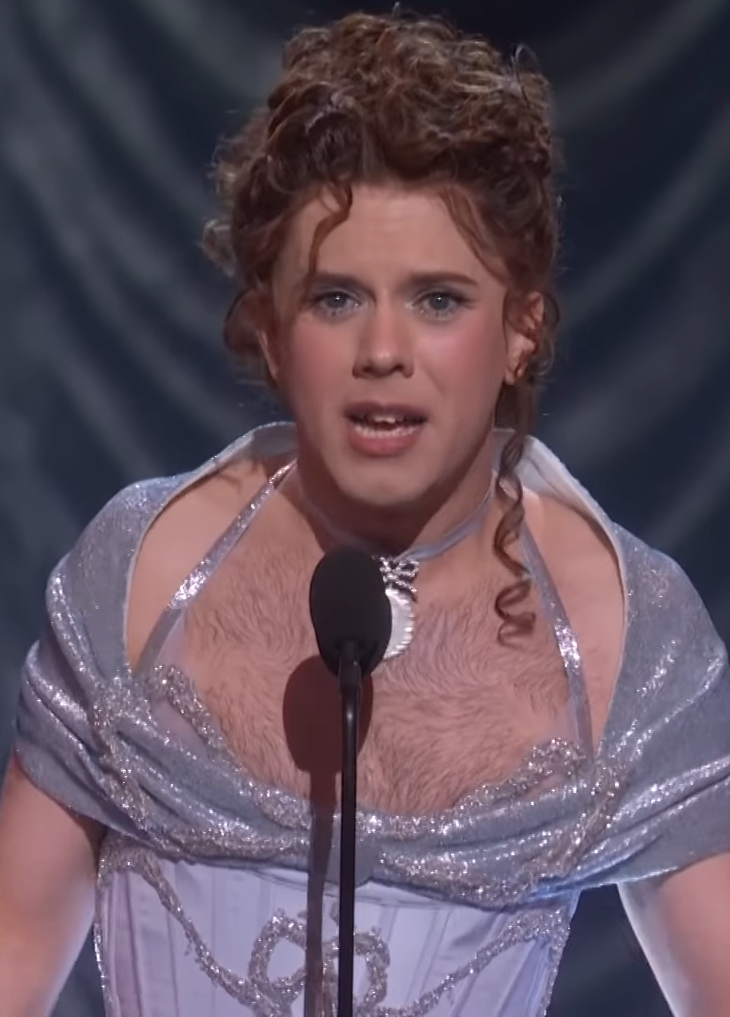
Cole Escola won for Oh, Mary! (2025)

=== 1940s ===
Year	Actor	Project	Role(s)	Ref.
1947 (1st)	José Ferrer	Cyrano de Bergerac	Cyrano De Bergerac	
1947 (1st)	Fredric March	Years Ago	Clinton Jones	
1948 (2nd)	Henry Fonda	Mister Roberts	Lt. Roberts	
1948 (2nd)	Paul Kelly	Command Decision	Brigadier General K.C. Dennis	
1948 (2nd)	Basil Rathbone	The Heiress	Dr. Austin Sloper	
1949 (3rd)
1949 (3rd)	Rex Harrison	Anne of the Thousand Days	Henry VIII	

=== 1950s ===
Year	Actor	Project	Role(s)	Ref.
1950 (4th)
1950 (4th)	Sidney Blackmer	Come Back, Little Sheba	Doc	
1951 (5th)
1951 (5th)	Claude Rains	Darkness at Noon	Rubashov	
1952 (6th)
1952 (6th)	José Ferrer	The Shrike	Jim Downs	
1953 (7th)
1953 (7th)	Tom Ewell	The Seven Year Itch	Richard Sherman	
1954 (8th)
1954 (8th)	David Wayne	The Teahouse of the August Moon	Sakini	
1955 (9th)
1955 (9th)	Alfred Lunt	Quadrille	Diensen	
1956 (10th)
1956 (10th)	Paul Muni	Inherit the Wind	Henry Drummond	
1956 (10th)	Ben Gazzara	A Hatful of Rain	Johnny Pope	
1956 (10th)	Boris Karloff	The Lark	Pierre Cauchon	
1956 (10th)	Michael Redgrave	Tiger at the Gates	Hector	
1956 (10th)	Edward G. Robinson	Middle of the Night	The Manufacturer	
1957 (11th)
1957 (11th)	Fredric March	Long Day's Journey into Night	James Tyrone Sr.	
1957 (11th)	Maurice Evans	The Apple Cart	King Magnus	
1957 (11th)	Wilfrid Hyde-White	The Reluctant Debutante	Jimmy Broadbent	
1957 (11th)	Eric Portman	Separate Tables	Mr. Malcolm / Major Pollock	
1957 (11th)	Ralph Richardson	The Waltz of the Toreadors	General St. Pé	
1957 (11th)	Cyril Ritchard	Visit to a Small Planet	Kreton	
1958 (12th)
1958 (12th)	Ralph Bellamy	Sunrise at Campobello	Franklin D. Roosevelt	
1958 (12th)	Richard Burton	Time Remembered	Prince Albert	
1958 (12th)	Hugh Griffith	Look Homeward, Angel	W.O. Gant	
1958 (12th)	Laurence Olivier	The Entertainer	Archie Rice	
1958 (12th)	Anthony Perkins	Look Homeward, Angel	Eugene Gant	
1958 (12th)	Peter Ustinov	Romanoff and Juliet	The General	
1958 (12th)	Emlyn Williams	A Boy Growing Up	Himself	
1959 (13th)
1959 (13th)	Jason Robards	The Disenchanted	Manley Halliday	
1959 (13th)	Cedric Hardwicke	A Majority of One	Koichi Asano	
1959 (13th)	Alfred Lunt	The Visit	Anton Schill	
1959 (13th)	Christopher Plummer	J.B.	Nickles	
1959 (13th)	Cyril Ritchard	The Pleasure of His Company	Biddeford Poole	
1959 (13th)	Robert Stephens	Epitaph for George Dillon	George Dillon	

=== 1960s ===
Year	Actor	Project	Role(s)	Ref.
1960 (14th)
1960 (14th)	Melvyn Douglas	The Best Man	William Russell	
1960 (14th)	Sidney Poitier	A Raisin in the Sun	Walter Lee Younger	
1960 (14th)	Jason Robards	Toys in the Attic	Julian Berniers	
1960 (14th)	George C. Scott	The Andersonville Trial	Lt. Col. N. P. Chipman	
1960 (14th)	Lee Tracy	The Best Man	Arthur Hockstader	
1961 (15th)
1961 (15th)	Zero Mostel	Rhinocéros	John	
1961 (15th)	Hume Cronyn	Big Fish, Little Fish	Jimmie Luton	
1961 (15th)	Anthony Quinn	Becket	Henry II	
1961 (15th)	Sam Levene	The Devil's Advocate	Dr. Aldo Meyer	
1962 (16th)
1962 (16th)	Paul Scofield	A Man for All Seasons	Sir Thomas More	
1962 (16th)	Fredric March	Gideon	Angel	
1962 (16th)	John Mills	Ross	Aircraftman Ross	
1962 (16th)	Donald Pleasence	The Caretaker	Davies	
1963 (17th)
1963 (17th)	Arthur Hill	Who's Afraid of Virginia Woolf?	George	
1963 (17th)	Charles Boyer	Lord Pengo	Lord Pengo	
1963 (17th)	Paul Ford	Never Too Late	Harry Lambert	
1963 (17th)	Bert Lahr	The Beauty Part	Various Characters	
1964 (18th)
1964 (18th)	Alec Guinness	Dylan	Dylan Thomas	
1964 (18th)	Richard Burton	Hamlet	Hamlet	
1964 (18th)	Albert Finney	Luther	Martin Luther	
1964 (18th)	Jason Robards	After the Fall	Quentin	
1965 (19th)
1965 (19th)	Walter Matthau	The Odd Couple	Oscar Madison	
1965 (19th)	John Gielgud	Tiny Alice	Julian	
1965 (19th)	Donald Pleasence	Poor Bitos	Bitos (Robespieere)	
1965 (19th)	Jason Robards	Hughie	"Erie" Smith	
1966 (20th)
1966 (20th)	Hal Holbrook	Mark Twain Tonight!	Mark Twain	
1966 (20th)	Patrick Bedford & Donal Donnelly	Philadelphia, Here I Come!	Gareth O'Donnell	
1966 (20th)	Roland Culver	Ivanov	Pavel Lebedev	
1966 (20th)	Nicol Williamson	Inadmissible Evidence	Bill Maitland	
1967 (21st)
1967 (21st)	Paul Rogers	The Homecoming	Max	
1967 (21st)	Hume Cronyn	A Delicate Balance	Tobias	
1967 (21st)	Donald Madden	Black Comedy	Harold Gorringe	
1967 (21st)	Donald Moffat	Right You Are (If You Think You Are)	Lamberto Laudisi	
1967 (21st)	Donald Moffat	The Wild Duck	Hjalmar Ekdal	
1968 (22nd)
1968 (22nd)	Martin Balsam	You Know I Can't Hear You When the Water's Running	Various Characters	
1968 (22nd)	Albert Finney	A Day in the Death of Joe Egg	Bri	
1968 (22nd)	Milo O'Shea	Staircase	Harry C. Leeds	
1968 (22nd)	Alan Webb	I Never Sang for My Father	Tom Garrison	
1969 (23rd)
1969 (23rd)	James Earl Jones	The Great White Hope	Jack Jefferson	
1969 (23rd)	Art Carney	Lovers	Andy Tracey	
1969 (23rd)	Alec McCowen	Hadrian the Seventh	Fr. William Rolfe	
1969 (23rd)	Donald Pleasence	The Man in the Glass Booth	Arthur Goldman	

=== 1970s ===
Year	Actor	Project	Role(s)	Ref.
1970 (24th)
1970 (24th)	Fritz Weaver	Child's Play	Jerome Malley	
1970 (24th)	James Coco	Last of the Red Hot Lovers	Barney Cashman	
1970 (24th)	Frank Grimes	Borstal Boy	Young Behan	
1970 (24th)	Stacy Keach	Indians	Buffalo Bill	
1971 (25th)
1971 (25th)	Brian Bedford	The School for Wives	Arnolphe	
1971 (25th)	John Gielgud	Home	Harry	
1971 (25th)	Alec McCowen	The Philanthropist	Philip	
1971 (25th)	Ralph Richardson	Home	Jack	
1972 (26th)
1972 (26th)	Cliff Gorman	Lenny	Lenny Bruce	
1972 (26th)	Tom Aldredge	Sticks and Bones	Ozzie	
1972 (26th)	Donald Pleasence	Wise Child	Mrs. Artminster	
1972 (26th)	Jason Robards	The Country Girl	Frank Elgin	
1973 (27th)
1973 (27th)	Alan Bates	Butley	Ben Butley	
1973 (27th)	Jack Albertson	The Sunshine Boys	Willie Clark	
1973 (27th)	Wilfrid Hyde-White	The Jockey Club Stakes	Marquis of Candover	
1973 (27th)	Paul Sorvino	That Championship Season	Phil Romano	
1974 (28th)
1974 (28th)	Michael Moriarty	Find Your Way Home	Julian Weston	
1974 (28th)	Zero Mostel	Ulysses in Nighttown	Leopold Bloom	
1974 (28th)	Jason Robards	A Moon for the Misbegotten	James Tyrone Jr.	
1974 (28th)	George C. Scott	Uncle Vanya	Mikhail lvovich Astrov	
1974 (28th)	Nicol Williamson	Uncle Vanya	Ivan Petrovich Voinitsky	
1975 (29th)
1975 (29th)	John Kani & Winston Ntshona	Sizwe Banzi Is Dead / The Island	Various Characters	
1975 (29th)	Jim Dale	Scapino!	Scapino	
1975 (29th)	Peter Firth	Equus	Alan Strang	
1975 (29th)	Henry Fonda	Clarence Darrow	Clarence Darrow	
1975 (29th)	Ben Gazzara	Hughie and Duet	"Erie" Smith	
1975 (29th)	John Wood	Sherlock Holmes	Sherlock Holmes	
1976 (30th)
1976 (30th)	John Wood	Travesties	Henry Carr	
1976 (30th)	Moses Gunn	The Poison Tree	Benjamin Hurspool	
1976 (30th)	George C. Scott	Death of a Salesman	Willy Loman	
1976 (30th)	Donald Sinden	Habeas Corpus	Arthur Wicksteed	
1977 (31st)
1977 (31st)	Al Pacino	The Basic Training of Pavlo Hummel	Pavlo Hummel	
1977 (31st)	Tom Courtenay	Otherwise Engaged	Simon	
1977 (31st)	Ben Gazzara	Who's Afraid of Virginia Woolf?	George	
1977 (31st)	Ralph Richardson	No Man's Land	Hirst	
1978 (32nd)
1978 (32nd)	Barnard Hughes	Da	Da	
1978 (32nd)	Hume Cronyn	The Gin Game	Weller Martin	
1978 (32nd)	Frank Langella	Dracula	Dracula	
1978 (32nd)	Jason Robards	A Touch of the Poet	Cornelius Melody	
1979 (33rd)
1979 (33rd)	Tom Conti	Whose Life Is It Anyway?	Ken Harrison	
1979 (33rd)	Philip Anglim	The Elephant Man	John Merrick	
1979 (33rd)	Jack Lemmon	Tribute	Scottie Templeton	
1979 (33rd)	Alec McCowen	St. Mark's Gospel	Mark	

=== 1980s ===
Year	Actor	Project	Role(s)	Ref.
1980 (34th)
1980 (34th)	John Rubinstein	Children of a Lesser God	James Leeds	
1980 (34th)	Charles Brown	Home	Cephus Miles	
1980 (34th)	Gerald Hiken	Strider	Strider	
1980 (34th)	Judd Hirsch	Talley's Folly	Matt Friedman	
1981 (35th)
1981 (35th)	Ian McKellen	Amadeus	Antonio Salieri	
1981 (35th)	Tim Curry	Amadeus	Wolfgang Amadeus Mozart	
1981 (35th)	Roy Dotrice	A Life	Drumm	
1981 (35th)	Jack Weston	The Floating Light Bulb	Jerry Wexler	
1982 (36th)
1982 (36th)	Roger Rees	The Life and Adventures of Nicholas Nickleby	Nicholas Nickleby	
1982 (36th)	Tom Courtenay	The Dresser	Norman	
1982 (36th)	Milo O'Shea	Mass Appeal	Father Tim Farley	
1982 (36th)	Christopher Plummer	Othello	Iago	
1983 (37th)
1983 (37th)	Harvey Fierstein	Torch Song Trilogy	Arnold Beckoff	
1983 (37th)	Jeffrey DeMunn	K2	Taylor	
1983 (37th)	Edward Herrmann	Plenty	Raymond Brock	
1983 (37th)	Tony Lo Bianco	A View from the Bridge	Eddie Carbone	
1984 (38th)
1984 (38th)	Jeremy Irons	The Real Thing	Henry	
1984 (38th)	Rex Harrison	Heartbreak House	Captain Shotover	
1984 (38th)	Calvin Levels	Open Admissions	Calvin Jefferson	
1984 (38th)	Ian McKellen	Ian McKellen Acting Shakespeare	Himself	
1985 (39th)
1985 (39th)	Derek Jacobi	Much Ado About Nothing	Benedick	
1985 (39th)	Jim Dale	A Day in the Death of Joe Egg	Bri	
1985 (39th)	Jonathan Hogan	As Is	Rich	
1985 (39th)	John Lithgow	Requiem for a Heavyweight	Harlan "Mountain" McClintock	
1986 (40th)
1986 (40th)	Judd Hirsch	I'm Not Rappaport	Nat	
1986 (40th)	Hume Cronyn	The Petition	General Sir Edmund Milne	
1986 (40th)	Ed Harris	Precious Sons	Fred	
1986 (40th)	Jack Lemmon	Long Day's Journey into Night	James Tyrone Sr.	
1987 (41st)
1987 (41st)	James Earl Jones	Fences	Troy Maxson	
1987 (41st)	Philip Bosco	You Never Can Tell	Waiter	
1987 (41st)	Richard Kiley	All My Sons	Joe Keller	
1987 (41st)	Alan Rickman	Les Liaisons Dangereuses	Le Vicomte de Valmont	
1988 (42nd)
1988 (42nd)	Ron Silver	Speed-the-Plow	Charlie Fox	
1988 (42nd)	Derek Jacobi	Breaking the Code	Alan Turing	
1988 (42nd)	John Lithgow	M. Butterfly	Rene Gallimard	
1988 (42nd)	Robert Prosky	A Walk in the Woods	Andrey Botvinnik	
1989 (43rd)
1989 (43rd)	Philip Bosco	Lend Me a Tenor	Saunders	
1989 (43rd)	Mikhail Baryshnikov	Metamorphosis	Gregor Samsa	
1989 (43rd)	Victor Garber	Lend Me a Tenor	Max	
1989 (43rd)	Bill Irwin	Largely New York	The Post-Modern Hoofer	

=== 1990s ===
Year	Actor	Project	Role(s)	Ref.
1990 (44th)
1990 (44th)	Robert Morse	Tru	Truman Capote	
1990 (44th)	Charles S. Dutton	The Piano Lesson	Boy Willie	
1990 (44th)	Dustin Hoffman	The Merchant of Venice	Shylock	
1990 (44th)	Tom Hulce	A Few Good Men	Lieutenant Daniel Kaffee, USN, JAG Corps	
1991 (45th)
1991 (45th)	Nigel Hawthorne	Shadowlands	C. S. Lewis	
1991 (45th)	Peter Frechette	Our Country's Good	Ralph Clark	
1991 (45th)	Tom McGowan	La Bête	Valere	
1991 (45th)	Courtney B. Vance	Six Degrees of Separation	Paul	
1992 (46th)
1992 (46th)	Judd Hirsch	Conversations with My Father	Eddie	
1992 (46th)	Alan Alda	Jake's Women	Jake	
1992 (46th)	Alec Baldwin	A Streetcar Named Desire	Stanley Kowalski	
1992 (46th)	Brian Bedford	Two Shakespearean Actors	William Charles Macready	
1993 (47th)
1993 (47th)	Ron Leibman	Angels in America: Millennium Approaches	Roy Cohn, et al.	
1993 (47th)	K. Todd Freeman	The Song of Jacob Zulu	Jacob Zulu	
1993 (47th)	Liam Neeson	Anna Christie	Mat Burke	
1993 (47th)	Stephen Rea	Someone Who'll Watch Over Me	Edward	
1994 (48th)
1994 (48th)	Stephen Spinella	Angels in America: Perestroika	Prior Walter	
1994 (48th)	Brian Bedford	Timon of Athens	Timon	
1994 (48th)	Christopher Plummer	No Man's Land	Spooner	
1994 (48th)	Sam Waterston	Abe Lincoln in Illinois	Abraham Lincoln	
1995 (49th)
1995 (49th)	Ralph Fiennes	Hamlet	Prince Hamlet	
1995 (49th)	Brian Bedford	The Molière Comedies	Sganarelle	
1995 (49th)	Roger Rees	Indiscretions	George	
1995 (49th)	Joe Sears	A Tuna Christmas	Various Characters	
1996 (50th)
1996 (50th)	George Grizzard	A Delicate Balance	Tobias	
1996 (50th)	Philip Bosco	Moon Over Buffalo	George Hay	
1996 (50th)	George C. Scott	Inherit the Wind	Henry Drummond	
1996 (50th)	Martin Shaw	An Ideal Husband	Lord Goring	
1997 (51st)
1997 (51st)	Christopher Plummer	Barrymore	John Barrymore	
1997 (51st)	Brian Bedford	London Assurance	Sir Harcourt Courtly	
1997 (51st)	Michael Gambon	Skylight	Tom Sergeant	
1997 (51st)	Antony Sher	Stanley	Stanley	
1998 (52nd)
1998 (52nd)	Anthony LaPaglia	A View from the Bridge	Eddie Carbone	
1998 (52nd)	Richard Briers	The Chairs	Old Man	
1998 (52nd)	John Leguizamo	Freak	Himself	
1998 (52nd)	Alfred Molina	Art	Yvan	
1999 (53rd)
1999 (53rd)	Brian Dennehy	Death of a Salesman	Willy Loman	
1999 (53rd)	Brían F. O'Byrne	The Lonesome West	Valene Connor	
1999 (53rd)	Corin Redgrave	Not About Nightingales	Bert "Boss" Whalen	
1999 (53rd)	Kevin Spacey	The Iceman Cometh	Theodore "Hickey" Hickman	

=== 2000s ===
Year	Actor	Project	Role(s)	Ref.
2000 (54th)
2000 (54th)	Stephen Dillane	The Real Thing	Henry	
2000 (54th)	Gabriel Byrne	A Moon for the Misbegotten	James Tyrone Jr.	
2000 (54th)	Philip Seymour Hoffman	True West	Austin / Lee	
2000 (54th)	John C. Reilly	True West	Austin / Lee	
2000 (54th)	David Suchet	Amadeus	Antonio Salieri	
2001 (55th)
2001 (55th)	Richard Easton	The Invention of Love	A. E. Housman, aged 77	
2001 (55th)	Sean Campion	Stones in His Pockets	Jake Quinn	
2001 (55th)	Conleth Hill	Stones in His Pockets	Charlie Conlon	
2001 (55th)	Gary Sinise	One Flew Over the Cuckoo's Nest	Randle McMurphy	
2001 (55th)	Brian Stokes Mitchell	King Hedley II	King	
2002 (56th)
2002 (56th)	Alan Bates	Fortune's Fool	Vassily Semyonitch Kuzovkin	
2002 (56th)	Billy Crudup	The Elephant Man	John Merrick	
2002 (56th)	Liam Neeson	The Crucible	John Proctor	
2002 (56th)	Alan Rickman	Private Lives	Elyot Chase	
2002 (56th)	Jeffrey Wright	Topdog/Underdog	Lincoln	
2003 (57th)
2003 (57th)	Brian Dennehy	Long Day's Journey into Night	James Tyrone Sr.	
2003 (57th)	Brian Bedford	Tartuffe	Orgon	
2003 (57th)	Eddie Izzard	A Day in the Death of Joe Egg	Bri	
2003 (57th)	Paul Newman	Our Town	Stage Manager	
2003 (57th)	Stanley Tucci	Frankie and Johnny in the Clair de Lune	Johnny	
2004 (58th)
2004 (58th)	Jefferson Mays	I Am My Own Wife	Charlotte von Mahlsdorf, et al.	
2004 (58th)	Simon Russell Beale	Jumpers	George	
2004 (58th)	Kevin Kline	Henry IV	Sir John Falstaff	
2004 (58th)	Frank Langella	Match	Tobi	
2004 (58th)	Christopher Plummer	King Lear	King Lear	
2005 (59th)
2005 (59th)	Bill Irwin	Who's Afraid of Virginia Woolf?	George	
2005 (59th)	Philip Bosco	Twelve Angry Men	Juror #3	
2005 (59th)	Billy Crudup	The Pillowman	Katurian	
2005 (59th)	James Earl Jones	On Golden Pond	Norman Thayer Jr.	
2005 (59th)	Brían F. O'Byrne	Doubt: A Parable	Father Flynn	
2006 (60th)
2006 (60th)	Richard Griffiths	The History Boys	Douglas Hector	
2006 (60th)	Ralph Fiennes	Faith Healer	Francis Hardy	
2006 (60th)	Željko Ivanek	The Caine Mutiny Court-Martial	Lt. Com. Phillip Francis Queeg	
2006 (60th)	Oliver Platt	Shining City	John	
2006 (60th)	David Wilmot	The Lieutenant of Inishmore	Padraic	
2007 (61st)
2007 (61st)	Frank Langella	Frost/Nixon	Richard Nixon	
2007 (61st)	Boyd Gaines	Journey's End	Lieut. Osborne	
2007 (61st)	Brían F. O'Byrne	The Coast of Utopia	Alexander Herzen	
2007 (61st)	Christopher Plummer	Inherit the Wind	Henry Drummond	
2007 (61st)	Liev Schreiber	Talk Radio	Barry Champlain	
2008 (62nd)
2008 (62nd)	Mark Rylance	Boeing-Boeing	Robert Lambert	
2008 (62nd)	Ben Daniels	Les Liaisons Dangereuses	Le Vicomte de Valmont	
2008 (62nd)	Laurence Fishburne	Thurgood	Thurgood Marshall	
2008 (62nd)	Rufus Sewell	Rock 'n' Roll	Jan	
2008 (62nd)	Patrick Stewart	Macbeth	Lord Macbeth	
2009 (63rd)
2009 (63rd)	Geoffrey Rush	Exit the King	King Berenger	
2009 (63rd)	Jeff Daniels	God of Carnage	Alan	
2009 (63rd)	Raúl Esparza	Speed-the-Plow	Charlie Fox	
2009 (63rd)	James Gandolfini	God of Carnage	Michael	
2009 (63rd)	Thomas Sadoski	reasons to be pretty	Greg	

=== 2010s ===
Year	Actor	Project	Role(s)	Ref.
2010 (64th)
2010 (64th)	Denzel Washington	Fences	Troy Maxson	
2010 (64th)	Jude Law	Hamlet	Hamlet	
2010 (64th)	Alfred Molina	Red	Mark Rothko	
2010 (64th)	Liev Schreiber	A View from the Bridge	Eddie Carbone	
2010 (64th)	Christopher Walken	A Behanding in Spokane	Carmichael	
2011 (65th)
2011 (65th)	Mark Rylance	Jerusalem	Johnny "Rooster" Byron	
2011 (65th)	Brian Bedford	The Importance of Being Earnest	Lady Bracknell	
2011 (65th)	Bobby Cannavale	The Motherfucker with the Hat	Jackie	
2011 (65th)	Joe Mantello	The Normal Heart	Ned Weeks	
2011 (65th)	Al Pacino	The Merchant of Venice	Shylock	
2012 (66th)
2012 (66th)	James Corden	One Man, Two Guvnors	Francis Henshall	
2012 (66th)	James Earl Jones	The Best Man	Ex-President Art Hockstader	
2012 (66th)	Philip Seymour Hoffman	Death of a Salesman	Willy Loman	
2012 (66th)	Frank Langella	Man and Boy	Gregor Antonescu	
2012 (66th)	John Lithgow	The Columnist	Joseph Alsop	
2013 (67th)
2013 (67th)	Tracy Letts	Who's Afraid of Virginia Woolf?	George	
2013 (67th)	Tom Hanks	Lucky Guy	Mike McAlary	
2013 (67th)	Nathan Lane	The Nance	Chauncey Miles	
2013 (67th)	David Hyde Pierce	Vanya and Sonia and Masha and Spike	Vanya	
2013 (67th)	Tom Sturridge	Orphans	Phillip	
2014 (68th)
2014 (68th)	Bryan Cranston	All the Way	Lyndon B. Johnson	
2014 (68th)	Samuel Barnett	Twelfth Night	Viola	
2014 (68th)	Chris O'Dowd	Of Mice and Men	Lennie Small	
2014 (68th)	Mark Rylance	Richard III	Richard III	
2014 (68th)	Tony Shalhoub	Act One	Moss Hart / Barnett Hart / George S. Kaufman	
2015 (69th)
2015 (69th)	Alex Sharp	The Curious Incident of the Dog in the Night-Time	Christopher Boone	
2015 (69th)	Steven Boyer	Hand to God	Jason / Tyrone	
2015 (69th)	Bradley Cooper	The Elephant Man	John Merrick	
2015 (69th)	Ben Miles	Wolf Hall Parts One & Two	Thomas Cromwell	
2015 (69th)	Bill Nighy	Skylight	Tom Sergeant	
2016 (70th)
2016 (70th)	Frank Langella	The Father	Andre	
2016 (70th)	Gabriel Byrne	Long Day's Journey into Night	James Tyrone Sr.	
2016 (70th)	Jeff Daniels	Blackbird	Ray Brooks	
2016 (70th)	Tim Pigott-Smith	King Charles III	King Charles III	
2016 (70th)	Mark Strong	A View from the Bridge	Eddie Carbone	
2017 (71st)
2017 (71st)	Kevin Kline	Present Laughter	Garry Essendine	
2017 (71st)	Denis Arndt	Heisenberg	Alex Priest	
2017 (71st)	Chris Cooper	A Doll's House, Part 2	Torvald Helmer	
2017 (71st)	Corey Hawkins	Six Degrees of Separation	Paul	
2017 (71st)	Jefferson Mays	Oslo	Terje Rød-Larsen	
2018 (72nd)
2018 (72nd)	Andrew Garfield	Angels in America	Prior Walter, et al.	
2018 (72nd)	Tom Hollander	Travesties	Henry Carr	
2018 (72nd)	Jamie Parker	Harry Potter and the Cursed Child	Harry Potter	
2018 (72nd)	Mark Rylance	Farinelli and the King	Philip V of Spain	
2018 (72nd)	Denzel Washington	The Iceman Cometh	Theodore "Hickey" Hickman	
2019 (73rd)
2019 (73rd)	Bryan Cranston	Network	Howard Beale	
2019 (73rd)	Paddy Considine	The Ferryman	Quinn Carney	
2019 (73rd)	Jeff Daniels	To Kill a Mockingbird	Atticus Finch	
2019 (73rd)	Adam Driver	Burn This	Pale	
2019 (73rd)	Jeremy Pope	Choir Boy	Pharus Jonathan Young	

=== 2020s ===
Year	Actor	Project	Role(s)
2020 (74th)
2020 (74th)	Andrew Burnap	The Inheritance	Toby Darling
2020 (74th)	Ian Barford	Linda Vista	Wheeler
2020 (74th)	Jake Gyllenhaal	Sea Wall/A Life	Abe
2020 (74th)	Tom Hiddleston	Betrayal	Robert
2020 (74th)	Tom Sturridge	Sea Wall/A Life	Alex
2020 (74th)	Blair Underwood	A Soldier's Play	Captain Richard Davenport
2022 (75th)
2022 (75th)	Simon Russell Beale	The Lehman Trilogy	Henry Lehman
2022 (75th)	Adam Godley	The Lehman Trilogy	Mayer Lehman
2022 (75th)	Adrian Lester	The Lehman Trilogy	Emanuel Lehman
2022 (75th)	David Morse	How I Learned to Drive	Uncle Peck
2022 (75th)	Sam Rockwell	American Buffalo	Teach
2022 (75th)	Ruben Santiago-Hudson	Lackawanna Blues	Various Characters
2022 (75th)	David Threlfall	Hangmen	Harry Wade
2023 (76th)
2023 (76th)	Sean Hayes	Good Night, Oscar	Oscar Levant
2023 (76th)	Yahya Abdul-Mateen II	Topdog/Underdog	Booth
2023 (76th)	Corey Hawkins	Topdog/Underdog	Lincoln
2023 (76th)	Stephen McKinley Henderson	Between Riverside and Crazy	Pops
2023 (76th)	Wendell Pierce	Death of a Salesman	Willy Loman
2024 (77th)
2024 (77th)	Jeremy Strong	An Enemy of the People	Doctor Thomas Stockmann
2024 (77th)	William Jackson Harper	Uncle Vanya	Astrov
2024 (77th)	Leslie Odom Jr.	Purlie Victorious	Purlie Victorious Judson
2024 (77th)	Liev Schreiber	Doubt: A Parable	Father Brendan Flynn
2024 (77th)	Michael Stuhlbarg	Patriots	Boris Berezovsky
2025 (78th)
2025 (78th)	Cole Escola	Oh, Mary!	Mary Todd Lincoln
2025 (78th)	George Clooney	Good Night, and Good Luck	Edward R. Murrow
2025 (78th)	Jon Michael Hill	Purpose	Nazareth "Naz" Jasper
2025 (78th)	Daniel Dae Kim	Yellow Face	DHH
2025 (78th)	Harry Lennix	Purpose	Solomon "Sonny" Jasper
2025 (78th)	Louis McCartney	Stranger Things: The First Shadow	Henry Creel
2026 (79th)
2026 (79th)	John Lithgow	Giant	Roald Dahl
2026 (79th)	Will Harrison	Punch	Jacob Dunne
2026 (79th)	Nathan Lane	Death of a Salesman	Willy Loman
2026 (79th)	Daniel Radcliffe	Every Brilliant Thing	Narrator
2026 (79th)	Mark Strong	Oedipus	Oedipus

== Most wins ==
2 wins

- Alan Bates
- Bryan Cranston
- Brian Dennehy
- José Ferrer
- Judd Hirsch
- James Earl Jones
- Frank Langella
- Fredric March
- Mark Rylance

== Most nominations ==
7 nominations

- Brian Bedford
- Jason Robards

6 nominations

- Christopher Plummer

5 nominations

- Frank Langella

4 nominations

- Philip Bosco
- Hume Cronyn
- James Earl Jones
- John Lithgow
- Donald Pleasence
- Mark Rylance
- George C. Scott

3 nominations

- Jeff Daniels
- Ben Gazzara
- Judd Hirsch
- Fredric March
- Alec McCowen
- Brían F. O'Byrne
- Ralph Richardson
- Liev Schreiber

2 nominations

- Alan Bates
- Richard Burton
- Gabriel Byrne
- Tom Courtenay
- Bryan Cranston
- Billy Crudup
- Jim Dale
- Brian Dennehy
- José Ferrer
- Ralph Fiennes
- Albert Finney
- Henry Fonda
- John Gielgud
- Rex Harrison
- Corey Hawkins
- Philip Seymour Hoffman
- Wilfrid Hyde-White
- Bill Irwin
- Derek Jacobi
- Kevin Kline
- Nathan Lane
- Alfred Lunt
- Jack Lemmon
- Jefferson Mays
- Ian McKellen
- Alfred Molina
- Zero Mostel
- Liam Neeson
- Milo O'Shea
- Al Pacino
- Roger Rees
- Alan Rickman
- Cyril Ritchard
- Mark Strong
- Tom Sturridge
- Denzel Washington
- Nicol Williamson
- John Wood

== Character win total ==
3 wins

- George from Who's Afraid of Virginia Woolf?

2 wins

- Henry from The Real Thing
- James Tyrone Sr. from Long Day's Journey into Night
- Prior Walter from Angels in America
- Troy Maxson from Fences

== Character nomination total ==
5 nominations

- Willy Loman from Death of a Salesman

4 nominations

- Eddie Carbone from A View from the Bridge
- George from Who's Afraid of Virginia Woolf?
- James Tyrone Sr. from Long Day's Journey into Night

3 nominations

- Bri from A Day in the Death of Joe Egg
- Hamlet from Hamlet
- Henry Drummond from Inherit the Wind
- John Merrick from The Elephant Man

2 nominations

- Antonio Salieri from Amadeus
- Charlie Fox from Speed-the-Plow
- Father Brendan Flynn from Doubt: A Parable
- Henry from The Real Thing
- Henry Carr from Travesties
- James Tyrone Jr. from A Moon for the Misbegotten
- Le Vicomte de Valmont from Les Liaisons Dangereuses
- Lincoln from Topdog/Underdog
- Mikhail lvovich Astrov from Uncle Vanya
- Paul from Six Degrees of Separation
- President Ari Hockstader from The Best Man
- Prior Walter from Angels in America
- Shylock from The Merchant of Venice
- Theodore "Hickey" Hickman from The Iceman Cometh
- Tobias from A Delicate Balance
- Tom Sergeant from Skylight
- Troy Maxson from Fences

== Productions with multiple nominations ==
boldface=winner

- Look Homeward, Angel – Alizwa Mleni and Anthony Perkins
- The Best Man – **Melvyn Douglas** and Lee Tracy
- Philadelphia, Here I Come! – Patrick Bedford and Donal Donnelly (jointly)
- Home – John Gielgud and Ralph Richardson
- Uncle Vanya – George C. Scott and Nicol Williamson
- Sizwe Banzi is Dead and The Island – **John Kani** and **Winston Ntshona** (jointly)
- Amadeus – **Ian McKellen** and Tim Curry
- Lend Me a Tenor – **Philip Bosco** and Victor Garber
- True West – Philip Seymour Hoffman and John C. Reilly
- Stones In His Pockets – Sean Campion and Conleth Hill
- God of Carnage – Jeff Daniels and James Gandolfini
- Sea Wall/A Life – Jake Gyllenhaal and Tom Sturridge
- The Lehman Trilogy – **Simon Russell Beale**, Adam Godley and Adrian Lester
- Topdog/Underdog – Yahya Abdul-Mateen II and Corey Hawkins

== Multiple awards and nominations ==
Actors who have been nominated multiple times in any acting categories

Awards	Nominations	Recipient
4	7	Frank Langella
4	5	Boyd Gaines
3	7	John Lithgow
3	7	Nathan Lane
3	5	Mark Rylance
3	4	Kevin Kline
3	4	Zero Mostel
3	3	Hinton Battle
2	7	Christopher Plummer
2	6	Michael Cerveris
2	5	Christian Borle
2	5	George Hearn
2	5	George Rose
2	5	John Cullum
2	5	Robert Morse
2	4	James Earl Jones
2	4	Norbert Leo Butz
2	4	Richard Kiley
2	3	Al Pacino
2	3	David Burns
2	3	David Wayne
2	3	Fredric March
2	3	Judd Hirsch
2	3	Matthew Broderick
2	3	Phil Silvers
2	3	Rex Harrison
2	3	Robert Preston
2	3	Stephen Spinella
2	3	Walter Matthau
2	2	Alan Bates
2	2	Brian Dennehy
2	2	Bryan Cranston
2	2	Harvey Fierstein
2	2	Hiram Sherman
2	2	James Naughton
2	2	Jonathan Pryce
2	2	José Ferrer
2	2	Russell Nype
2	2	Tommy Tune
1	9	Danny Burstein
1	8	Jason Robards
1	7	Brian Bedford
1	6	Philip Bosco
1	5	Brandon Uranowitz
1	5	Brían F. O'Byrne
1	5	Hume Cronyn
1	5	Jim Dale
1	4	André De Shields
1	4	Billy Crudup
1	4	Brian Stokes Mitchell
1	4	Cyril Ritchard
1	4	David Alan Grier
1	4	Gregory Hines
1	4	Jack Cassidy
1	4	Joel Grey
1	4	Jonathan Groff
1	4	Joshua Henry
1	4	Liev Schreiber
1	4	René Auberjonois
1	4	Tony Shalhoub
1	3	Alfred Drake
1	3	Barry Bostwick
1	3	Courtney B. Vance
1	3	David Hyde Pierce
1	3	Gary Beach
1	3	Gavin Creel
1	3	George Grizzard
1	3	Jefferson Mays
1	3	Jerry Orbach
1	3	John Wood
1	3	Larry Blyden
1	3	Len Cariou
1	3	Mandy Patinkin
1	3	Michael Rupert
1	3	Richard Burton
1	3	Robert Sean Leonard
1	3	Roger Bart
1	3	Ruben Santiago-Hudson
1	3	Scott Wise
1	2	Alfred Lunt
1	2	Andrew Garfield
1	2	Barnard Hughes
1	2	Ben Vereen
1	2	Ben Platt
1	2	Bert Lahr
1	2	Bertie Carvel
1	2	Bill Irwin
1	2	Brent Carver
1	2	Charles Nelson Reilly
1	2	Chuck Cooper
1	2	Cleavant Derricks
1	2	Cliff Gorman
1	2	Daniel Radcliffe
1	2	Denzel Washington
1	2	Derek Jacobi
1	2	Eddie Redmayne
1	2	Edward Herrmann
1	2	Fritz Weaver
1	2	Gabriel Ebert
1	2	George S. Irving
1	2	Henry Fonda
1	2	Hugh Jackman
1	2	Ian McKellen
1	2	Jack Albertson
1	2	James Monroe Iglehart
1	2	Jeffrey Wright
1	2	John Benjamin Hickey
1	2	John Glover
1	2	Kevin Spacey
1	2	Laurence Fishburne
1	2	Leslie Odom Jr.
1	2	Martin Short
1	2	Michael Gough
1	2	Michael McGrath
1	2	Paul Rogers
1	2	Ralph Fiennes
1	2	Ray Bolger
1	2	Reed Birney
1	2	Roger Rees
1	2	Roger Robinson
1	2	Ron Holgate
1	2	Roy Dotrice
1	2	Santino Fontana
1	2	Sean Hayes
1	2	Simon Russell Beale
1	2	Sydney Chaplin
1	2	Zakes Mokae

Nominations	Recipient
5	Brian d'Arcy James
5	George C. Scott
5	John McMartin
5	Tom Aldredge
4	Donald Pleasence
4	Gregg Edelman
4	Raúl Esparza
4	Raul Julia
4	Victor Garber
3	Alan Alda
3	Alec McCowen
3	Alfred Molina
3	Andy Karl
3	Ben Gazzara
3	Brandon Victor Dixon
3	Brian Murray
3	Brooks Ashmanskas
3	Christopher Fitzgerald
3	Gilbert Price
3	Harry Groener
3	Jeff Daniels
3	Joseph Maher
3	Joshua Henry
3	Kevin Chamberlin
3	Marc Kudisch
3	Philip Seymour Hoffman
3	Ralph Richardson
3	Robin de Jesús
3	Terrence Mann
3	Tim Curry
3	Željko Ivanek
2	Adam Godley
2	Alan Rickman
2	Albert Finney
2	Alex Brightman
2	Andrew Rannells
2	Andy Griffith
2	Anthony Heald
2	Anthony Perkins
2	Arian Moayed
2	Biff McGuire
2	Bob Gunton
2	Bobby Cannavale
2	Brad Oscar
2	Bruce Adler
2	Bryce Pinkham
2	Charles Brown
2	Charles S. Dutton
2	Christopher Sieber
2	Christopher Walken
2	Clive Revill
2	Conleth Hill
2	Corey Hawkins
2	David Carroll
2	David Morse
2	David Pittu
2	David Threlfall
2	Dick Anthony Williams
2	Donald Moffat
2	Edward Petherbridge
2	Edward Winter
2	Gabriel Byrne
2	Gary Sinise
2	Gavin Lee
2	Herschel Bernardi
2	Howard McGillin
2	Jack Gilford
2	Jack Lemmon
2	Jeremy Jordan
2	Jeremy Pope
2	Joe Mantello
2	Joel Blum
2	John Gielgud
2	Jon Michael Hill
2	Josh Groban
2	Jude Law
2	K. Todd Freeman
2	Keith Carradine
2	Larry Bryggman
2	Larry Haines
2	Lewis J. Stadlen
2	Liam Neeson
2	Lin-Manuel Miranda
2	Mark Strong
2	Maurice Evans
2	Maurice Hines
2	Michael Stuhlbarg
2	Milo O'Shea
2	Nicol Williamson
2	Patrick Wilson
2	Peter Frechette
2	Richard Thomas
2	Rob McClure
2	Robert Prosky
2	Robert Weede
2	Samuel Barnett
2	Samuel E. Wright
2	Savion Glover
2	Stark Sands
2	Stephen McKinley Henderson
2	Theodore Bikel
2	Tom Courtenay
2	Tom Sturridge
2	Tom Wopat
2	Tony Roberts
2	Wilfrid Hyde-White

== Trivia ==
- The lead role of George in Edward Albee's Who's Afraid of Virginia Woolf? has earned the Tony Award for three different actors who have performed the character:
  - 1963 – Arthur Hill
  - 2005 – Bill Irwin
  - 2013 – Tracy Letts
- Other male roles have produced multiple Tony Award winners: Henry in Tom Stoppard's The Real Thing
  - 1984 – Jeremy Irons
  - 2000 – Stephen Dillane
- James Tyrone Sr., in Eugene O'Neill's Long Day's Journey into Night
  - 1957 – Fredric March
  - 2003 – Brian Dennehy
- Troy Maxson in August Wilson's Fences
  - 1987 – James Earl Jones
  - 2010 – Denzel Washington
- Prior Walter in Tony Kushner's Angels in America
  - 1994 – Stephen Spinella
  - 2018 – Andrew Garfield
    - Spinella won this category in 1994 for playing Prior Walter in Angels in America: Perestroika one year after winning the award for Best Featured Actor in a Play for the same character in Angels in America: Millennium Approaches.
- In 2025, Cole Escola became the first non-binary actor to win the award, for their performance of Mary Todd Lincoln in Oh, Mary!.
- Actors have won Tony Awards for both Best Actor in a Play and Best Actor in a Musical for playing Cyrano de Bergerac: Jose Ferrer in Cyrano de Bergerac and Christopher Plummer in Cyrano.
- Donald Moffat was nominated for his performances in two different productions, Right You Are (If You Think You Are) and The Wild Duck, at the 21st Tony Awards.
- The youngest winner in the category is Alex Sharp (age 26). The oldest is John Lithgow (age 80).
- Actors have won Tony Awards for both Best Actor in a Play and Best Actress in a Play for playing Mary Todd Lincoln: Cole Escola in Oh, Mary! and Julie Harris in The Last of Mrs. Lincoln.

== See also ==
- Best Actor
- Drama Desk Award for Outstanding Actor in a Play
- Drama Desk Award for Outstanding Lead Performance in a Play
- Drama League Award for Distinguished Performance
- Laurence Olivier Award for Best Actor
- Leading actor
- Lists of acting awards
