= Mike McAlary =

American journalist (1957–1998)

Michael James McAlary (December 15, 1957 – December 25, 1998) was an American journalist and columnist who worked at the New York Daily News for 12 years, beginning with the police beat. He won a Pulitzer Prize in 1998 for his columns exposing police brutality against Haitian immigrant Abner Louima.

He was sued for libel by a woman he had falsely accused of lying in her claim that she had been raped. He also wrote five books inspired by cases he had covered. McAlary died of colon cancer in 1998 at the age of 41.

== Life and career ==
Born in 1957, McAlary started his journalism career as a sportswriter in Boston. He moved to New York to fill a similar position with the New York Post. In 1985 he became a reporter for New York Newsday, the major newspaper on Long Island. He left that position to become a columnist for the New York Daily News. He also wrote columns for the Post, jumping frequently between it and the "Daily News".

In 1988, McAlary wrote a non-fiction book, Buddy Boys, about corrupt police in New York's 77th Precinct, in the Brooklyn North patrol borough. He also had a hand in writing the script for the movie Cop Land, starring Sylvester Stallone and Robert De Niro.

In 1990, McAlary wrote a piece referring to a gang leader named Lefty, who had a friend killed in city gang warfare. Four years later, McAlary interviewed Lefty anew. By then the former gang leader was a decorated soldier, family man, and college student. He attributed his about-face to McAlary's 1990 article. McAlary ended his 1994 piece by writing, "I am humbled by his talent. Sure, as a columnist, you can get people indicted and even free the wrongly accused. That is what you do. But from now on, I know, at least once, I wrote a story that mattered."

For the Daily News McAlary exposed the torture of Abner Louima, a Haitian immigrant, by New York City Police at a Brooklyn station in August 1997. Next year he won the Pulitzer Prize for Commentary, based on his coverage of the story from August to October. He was also a finalist in the category Breaking News Reporting, re-classed as Commentary by the Board.

McAlary's most controversial story, for the Daily News in 1994, was about a woman who said she had been raped while walking home with groceries through Prospect Park, in Brooklyn. Unnamed police sources told McAlary that she made up the story, because she wanted to promote a rally about violence against lesbians. McAlary's police sources said there were inconsistencies in her story, and a lack of physical evidence. The police department later discovered DNA evidence, but no arrests were made at the time.

McAlary accepted the original police account of events, and wrote three columns about it, including one headlined, "Rape hoax the real crime." The woman sued McAlary for libel, but the case was dismissed because McAlary had been relying on information from the police.

In 2018, using advanced modern techniques, the New York police matched the DNA to James Edward Webb, who by then had been convicted of serial rape and was serving 75 years to life in prison for those other crimes. The statute of limitations had expired for prosecution of Webb for the 1994 Prospect Park case. Both the newspaper and the New York City Police have formally apologized to the woman for "letting her down."

McAlary's idols were New York journalists Jimmy Breslin, Murray Kempton, and Pete Hamill. During his reporting of the Louima case, McAlary was being treated for colon cancer. He left a chemotherapy session after getting a tip about the assault. He died on Christmas Day 1998, at age 41, eight months after winning the Pulitzer. He was a resident of Bellport, New York, at the time of his death.

== Representation in other media ==
- In The Paper (1994), a film directed by Ron Howard, a columnist named McDougal and played by Randy Quaid may have been based on McAlary. The columnist also had a cameo role in the film.
- Dan Klores wrote the play The Wood, based on McAlary's life, which premiered at Manhattan's Rattlestick Playwrights Theater in August 2011.
- Nora Ephron wrote the play Lucky Guy, also about McAlary, which opened on Broadway in a limited run on April 1, 2013, starring Tom Hanks, the playwright's longtime friend and film colleague.
- McAlary's coining of the nickname "the Last Call Killer" for the serial murderer eventually identified as Richard Rogers is discussed in the documentary series Last Call: When a Serial Killer Stalked Queer New York. Interviewee Matt Foreman describes the moniker as "offensive and anti-gay" and Bea Hanson characterizes McAlary's coverage of the murders as similarly "inflammatory" and homophobic.

== Books by McAlary ==
Non-fiction:

- Buddy Boys: when good cops turn bad (1987) ISBN 978-0792700937
- Cop Shot: the murder of Edward Byrne (1990) ISBN 978-0399134081
- Good Cop, Bad Cop: Detective Joe Trimboli's heroic pursuit of NYPD Officer Michael Dowd (1994) ISBN 978-0671897369

Novels:

- Cop Land: based on the screenplay by James Mangold (1997) ISBN 978-0786882526
- Sore Loser: a Mickey Donovan mystery (1998) ISBN 978-0688156107
