= Shoot to Kill (1990 film) =

1990 four-hour drama documentary directed by Peter Kosminsky

- Promotional image: Jack Shepherd as DCC John Stalker
- Genre: Television drama documentary
- Written by: Michael Eaton
- Directed by: Peter Kosminsky
- Starring: Jack Shepherd; David Calder; T. P. McKenna
- Country of origin: United Kingdom
- Original language: English
- No. of episodes: 2

Production
- Producer: Nigel Stafford-Clark
- Running time: 120 and 60+70 minutes
- Production companies: Zenith Productions for Yorkshire Television

Original release
- Network: ITV
- Release: 3 June – 4 June 1990

Shoot to Kill is a four-hour drama documentary reconstruction of the events that led to the 1984–86 Stalker Inquiry into the shooting of six terrorist suspects in Northern Ireland in 1982 by a specialist unit of the Royal Ulster Constabulary (RUC), allegedly without warning (the so-called shoot-to-kill policy); the organised fabrication of false accounts of the events; and the difficulties created for the inquiry team in their investigation.

The film, written by Michael Eaton, produced by Nigel Stafford-Clark and directed by Peter Kosminsky, was made by Zenith Productions for the ITV company Yorkshire Television, and screened in two parts over successive nights in June 1990. However, the programme was not broadcast in Northern Ireland itself, a precaution that Ulster Television said reflected legal advice that it might prejudice future inquests on the deceased, which had been suspended.

The programme was made with the co-operation of John Thorburn, Stalker's deputy with day-to-day responsibility on the inquiry, and was said to reveal significant new information about the underlying events and how the inquiry had progressed.

Shoot to Kill was widely applauded by critics. It won the 1990 award for Best Single Drama from both the Royal Television Society and the Broadcasting Press Guild, and a nomination in that category for a BAFTA Award. The score was written by Rachel Portman.

== Synopsis ==
The first two-hour part dramatises the events in late 1982 that lay behind the inquiry: the killing of three policemen by a massive landmine at Kinnego embankment in County Armagh; the fatal shooting of three members of the IRA, who turned out to be unarmed, in a car at Craigavon; the shooting dead of civilian Michael Tighe and wounding of Martin McCauley, also found to be unarmed, at a hayshed in Ballyneery near Lurgan; and the killing of two INLA members, again discovered to be unarmed, in a car at Mullacreavie Park, near Armagh; along with the creation of adjusted or fabricated accounts of the actions of RUC Special Support Unit members in the events, some of which unravelled in court in March 1984.

The second part shows Stalker, his second-in-command Thorburn, and the inquiry team, as they dig out more and more of what really happened, faced with a complete lack of encouragement from the RUC, a clash of views as to what was acceptable, and ultimately Stalker's removal from the inquiry before its conclusion.

== Detailed synopsis ==
=== Part One ===
Northern Ireland, 1982. A surveillance team, tipped off by an informant, tracks a trailerload of improvised explosives to an isolated barn. During the night the barn is searched, and a listening device is placed in it, but the signal is erratic. A battery is stolen from a dumper truck on a construction site. Although the area has nominally been put off-limits by Special Branch, a car with three uniformed police is cleared to investigate. RUC Chief Constable Sir John Hermon is preaching to a school assembly nearby while the car approaches the site on the Kinnego embankment. His text includes the injunction to "render not evil for evil". As he finishes, the car is wrecked and blasted into the air by an enormous bomb − the explosives from the hayshed. In police cells, the informant is roughly hauled from a group with whom he has been picked up. But in the privacy of an interview room the mood is quite different. He holds out for £5,000 to name the men who set the bomb.

The RUC's Special Support Unit (SSU) undergoes practice training for a hostage release, briefed to use "speed, firepower and aggression". Constable Robinson goes in, but it is a dummy hostage he shoots. The IRA informant, who has named Eugene Toman, Sean Burns and Martin McCauley as the perpetrators of the Kinnego bombing, picks out a man to Toman and Burns, photographed by a surveillance operative. They are going to try to kill this man, an RUC reservist. The special support unit are briefed. The unit are to set up a roadblock when they get the signal from the surveillance group, and use what they have learnt to stop these men. After a long surveillance, the team are stood down − just as Toman and Burns leave the house for their car. They chase the car and open fire; but when the car is later examined, its occupants all dead, they are found to be unarmed − and the driver is not McCauley, it is Gervaise McKerr. A uniformed CID detective turns up, but is told to go away and get a cup of tea; the support unit have all been sent away, he can interview them tomorrow. At RUC headquarters, Sir John fixes a line with senior officers: they must conceal the existence of the source, so they will say there was a routine roadblock at which an officer was injured; this is given to the media. Meanwhile, at the SSU barracks, DCI Flanagan sorts out what they will say has happened with his team. They will say they saw flashes from the car; they assumed they were under attack; so they returned fire. This is what Constable Brannigan tells the CID officer the next morning, denying that he fired any shots after the car had stopped.

The informant leaves Special Branch a message to expect another delivery at the hayshed. At the hayshed he meets Michael Tighe, a local who is there to feed the owner's dogs. Later a surveillance operative spots Martin McCauley in town; McCauley offers Tighe a ride on his bike. They go to the hayshed, where McCauley calls Tighe into the barn to look at some old rifles that he has spotted. The listening device operator informs DCI Flanagan, who gives the order to "clear the barn". The dogs outside bark, alerting the men, and then a track of bullet holes cuts across the door, and Tighe is hit. The SSU burst in, as the bugging operator listens, and warn McCauley to drop his weapons. The reels of the tape-recorder turn as an SSU man discusses whether to finish the wounded McCauley off. His colleagues counsel not: it is too open. But there is no ammunition, and there are no explosives. Tighe's house is raided, but the police find nothing. As they leave, they tell his parents that he drew a gun at a roadblock; the police had to kill him. At the barracks, the SSU men listen to a television news report: on a routine patrol, they had seen a gunman entering the barn, and heard the sound of a rifle being cocked. Entering the barn, there had been a man standing on a hay bale pointing a rifle in their direction. They had shouted two sets of warning, then opened fire. "This year's Nobel Prize for fiction", quips one of the SSU. In hospital McCauley listens to a television report of Tighe's funeral, which emphasises Tighe's lack of paramilitary links; McCauley is charged with possession of firearms and conspiracy to murder.

A senior officer carpets DCI Flanagan and his Detective Inspector for the failures of the SSU, culminating in their having "topped the only Taig in County Down with no connection to the paramilitaries". Flanagan thinks he can rectify the situation. He is told that those on high "won't wear it". Flanagan suggests they may be able to get hold of Dominic McGlinchey. The SSU is briefed. McGlinchey, head of the INLA is public enemy number one. An informer has suggested to two INLA men, Roddy Carroll and Seamus Grew that they cross the border and bring over McGlinchey "for some action". Their car will be tailed by Armagh Special Branch as it goes south of the border, with the SSU standing off close by − without being spotted by the Garda. Nobody is to touch it until it is stopped at a roadblock in the north. The SSU will be backing up the army, who will be handling surveillance. But the tail is held up going south at the border crossing and loses its target. That night an SSU car looking out for Carroll and Grew on the southern side of the border is spotted by the Garda; one of the SSU men telephones in from a call box to say he will be going back north, when Grew also comes to use the telephone box. The SSU pair hurry back to the north and switch cars, but are unable to confirm how many are in the target car. The Detective Inspector controlling the operation gives orders to the team to "crash out" the surveillance and get to their positions. But Constable Robinson is unable to find the checkpoint site, until he crashes his car into the back of an Army Land Rover. As he and the soldiers assess the situation, the suspect car drives through. He and his colleague are picked up by a second SSU car, and they catch up and overtake the target car, forcing it to a stop. The SSU open fire with their handguns, pockmarking the doors of the car with bullet holes. Robinson opens the door and shoots the driver several times. But there is no sign of McGlinchey; and Grew and Carroll were unarmed, with no sign of any weapons.

Back at barracks, Flanagan debriefs Robinson. Flanagan tells him that they were on a routine security patrol; they received a radio message to stop the suspect car, which had crashed through a checkpoint injuring an officer. They drove alongside the other car, and he had waved his cap out of the window to signal it to stop. Robinson protests that this is not what happened. But Flanagan tells him it is a question of national security, and he is bound by the Official Secrets Act: "The law requires that you say what I tell you to say." Meanwhile, an officer is made to roll on the ground by the roadside to establish forensic support, the armourer changes the date that the weapons were issued to hide the scale of the operation, and the transport officer is told to dispose of Robinson's crashed car without an accident report. Questioned by CID, Robinson asserts that he had shot in self-defence, initially from his car − Grew's car had revved up, its door had opened, and Robinson had heard a loud bang, making him feel his life was in danger. But the CID officer is unimpressed. According to forensics, Robinson had not shot Grew from a distance through the car door; Robinson had been three-foot away, and Grew had been unarmed. He needs a statement that fits the facts. Robinson protests that he is only saying what he has been told to say. Placed on trial for murder, Robinson tells the court how a superintendent, a chief inspector and other officers had told him to lie and given him a story to tell, to protect the fact that they were acting on information from an informer, so that it should appear as a chance encounter rather than a planned encounter.

In the Northern Ireland Office a meeting discusses how to deal with the fall-out from the trial. An outside inquiry is proposed, a suggestion supported by the Northern Ireland Director of Public Prosecutions (DPP). The RUC's Sir John Hermon is not happy; but is mollified that it is to him the inquiry would report, with the RUC responsible for the implementation of any findings. John Stalker, deputy chief constable of the Greater Manchester force, is recommended to head the inquiry. Stalker is contacted, and assured that the minister wants an in-depth inquiry, and any findings will be acted on − a telephone call that Stalker records. Arriving in Northern Ireland, Stalker and his deputy DCS John Thorburn meet Hermon in an otherwise empty golf club restaurant. Over brandies after their meal Hermon warns Stalker that there is a shoot-to-kill policy all right − one carried on by the terrorists; and it is Hermon, not Stalker, who will decide what gets referred to the DPP. They are not in Manchester, they are in the jungle now, and should be prepared accordingly. Stalker and his team are shown to what will be their offices, in an old hotel that the RUC now also uses for band practice, and adjacent to an RUC firing range. As they start to move in, a reel-to-reel tape recorder is capturing their every word.

=== Part Two ===
Stalker and Thorburn brief the detectives who will be the inquiry team, imagining that most of the work will be ploughing through a mass of paper records. But CID produce only three thin files on the cases, with only a few pages in each. At Special Branch headquarters Thorburn seeks the intelligence files on the deceased. Cups of tea are forthcoming, but no files. Stalker goes to see Hermon. Thorburn is allowed to see the files, but forbidden to take notes. A priest takes Stalker and Thorburn to see the McKerr family, to ask whether the RUC might specifically have been after Gervaise; but the McKerrs also are unforthcoming. Thorburn and Stalker interview Robinson, but he will not add anything to what he said in court, and refuses to name the officers who created the cover story. Nobody will talk to them. Stalker asks Thorburn who he thinks was responsible for the cover stories, and Thorburn suggests Flanagan − but Flanagan has been promoted by Hermon, and is now lecturing the top brass at Bramshill in England. Back at their hotel, there is a telephone call from a Catholic RUC sergeant, warning them that their office and their phones are bugged. He is about to give them some names at RUC Special Branch to look out for, but the call goes dead.

Thorburn wonders how Brannigan's story will stand up at trial. But the judge dismisses the prosecution case before the defence is even called, commending the three blameless SSU men for bringing the deceased to justice − in this case "to the final court of justice". Stalker orders a ballistics reconstruction to find out what really happened in the case, while Thorburn speaks to the pathologist. The conclusions from both are clear: rather than having fired only during the chase, Brannigan must have shot the wounded Toman in the back as he was trying to get out of the car, entirely contrary to Brannigan's statement of where he had been standing. However, when this is put to Brannigan he merely tells Thorburn he was doing his duty − something which would have been his duty whether or not he was in uniform, he protests, and something that Thorburn as a Scot ought to understand. Brannigan angrily seeks out Detective Superintendent Anderson, a senior Special Branch officer, and complains that Anderson is not doing enough to protect them. Anderson responds that the matter is in hand. In Whitehall, the minister notes a press story reminding that the SSUs had been sanctioned "at the highest level"—a public warning to him from the RUC. The DPP contends that it is in all their interests to keep the RUC "under pressure". But "not so much that the lid blows off", a Home Office official responds.

Thorburn shifts the focus to the shootings of Grew and Carroll, and sends some of the team out door-to-door to try to find an independent witness; meanwhile Thorburn himself confronts the armourer with the changed date. The team find that there was a witness; she had seen the car that crashed into the Army Land Rover. Thorburn goes to see the transport officer, who tells him there was no accident report − as had been instructed in a memo he produces, from the head of Special Branch himself. The armourer too explains who had ordered the changed date: it was the investigating CID officer. Interviewed, the CID officer protests that it had been "Special Branch business": procedure counted for nothing against national security. He rejects the allegation about the armourer's log; but, stung, tells Thorburn and Stalker that if they really want to know what it's all about, they need to look at the Kinnego embankment. Stalker and Thorburn review a television news report of the incident; a television researcher tells them the rumour at the time was that it had been another Special Branch foul-up. Thorburn looks up the computer record for the explosion, which identifies Toman, Burns and McCauley as the likely perpetrators. The intelligence is sourced to an informer; but when Thorburn keys in the cross-reference access it comes back as classified. Stalker and Thorburn go to the hayshed; Stalker is not pleased: "They must have known we would find out. Who do they think we are? Pinky and bloody Perky?" But Thorburn wonders whether there is more to it than that. Are Special Branch just protecting their source, or did they deliberately allow the explosives out of the hayshed to preserve his credibility? How else could it have got past their surveillance? Stalker tells him he has caught the Ulster bug: seeing conspiracy behind everything. A tape ironically repeats Thorburn's words: the hayshed is still wired for sound.

Thorburn interviews the source's handlers, probing them: How much had the source been paid? How much had he been paid so far in all? £20,000? £50,000? Could he have set up Toman and Burns, just for the money? Could he have deliberately planted the rifles in the hayshed? The answer comes back: "Have you not any idea what we're up against here? These are not ordinary villains who come quietly. This is the front line." Thorburn wants to see the man. Not likely: "His value to us is beyond estimation. You will never be allowed to compromise that position." Stalker and Thorburn go to see Michael Tighe's parents. They are surprised to hear that the parents had never been interviewed by the RUC. Stalker wants to know what the parents would want to see come out of his inquiry. The mother is quiet, stoical: "We've lost our son, Mr Stalker. Nothing you can do will bring him back to us." Moved, Stalker resolves in the car that he is going to "have those buggers". At the trial of Martin McCauley, the judge calls Stalker and Thorburn down from the public gallery to the press box − he wouldn't want them to miss anything. Constable "Y" testifies that he had heard a metallic noise from inside the hayshed, like a gun being cocked; and his sergeant had shouted warnings, several times. In the lobby outside, Stalker tries to talk to McCauley's solicitor Pat Finucane to set up a meeting with McCauley. But Finucane will have none of it. An RUC man harangues Stalker for the embarrassment he has caused the force, talking to a "flaming Provie", someone who is even worse than the IRA, and whose brother is a wanted terrorist on the run. Back in the trial Constable Y is questioned by McCauley's counsel about his claim that Tighe was standing above him on some bales with a rifle, yet the exit wounds were below the entrance wounds. "I wouldn't be in a position to say, my Lord" responds the constable. Back at the inquiry offices, the head of Special Branch is surprised when Stalker opens the interview with a formal caution, on the grounds of suppressing evidence and misleading the DPP. The RUC officer requests to talk to Stalker alone in private, and soon leaves − but he has brought with him the source's intelligence file, which Stalker hands Thorburn to read. Stalker goes back to listen to the trial, but gets a message to come out to talk to Thorburn. The file has been weeded as usual, but left in it is a record of a conversation the informer had with Tighe by the hayshed − so there must have been a listening device there the whole time. Stalker and Thorburn hurry to the DPP to get the trial suspended. If the tape contained discussion by the SSU men as to whether to finish McCauley off, this could be dynamite. But the DPP is more cautious. He does not think that anything they have said would prevent the continuation of the prosecution of McCauley. But he assures Stalker and Thorburn that if they did come up with evidence to support their speculations, his office would take it seriously. At the trial, the judge sets aside the whole of the RUC evidence on the basis that they had all initially falsely stated having seen a man armed with a gun going to the hayshed − something that they had been told to say by one of their superiors. He nevertheless finds McCauley guilty, but sentences him to a two-year suspended sentence.

Thorburn and Stalker question a young RUC constable who confirms he had been monitoring the tapes when Tighe and McCauley had been shot in the hayshed. But, he tells them, he cannot discuss the contents of the tape unless instructed to do so by his senior officers, under the terms of the Official Secrets Act. Stalker asks Hermon for the tape; Hermon says it is not his to give − it belongs to MI5. Thorburn asks to interview the informant. Hermon says it is out of the question − the informer belongs to Special Branch. Stalker reminds him that it is Special Branch he is there to investigate. Stalker informs Hermon as a parting shot that in connection with his inquiry, he will be wanting to interview the RUC's most senior officers, including Sir John himself, under formal caution. Back at the inquiry offices, Stalker delivers an angry appraisal of the situation to his team. Special Branch have been acting as a firm within a firm; it is like some death squads out of a banana republic − well not any longer. They are there to ensure the rule of law; they cannot descend to the terrorists' level; and Stalker is going to find out how high up it goes. All the while his words are being followed and recorded by RUC Special Branch. Stalker goes to see MI5 at their Gower Street headquarters in London. The MI5 officer is unctuous, telling Stalker that MI5 will not stand in his way, and wishing him good luck; but as Stalker leaves, the officer makes a call: "We may have a slight problem". Stalker is not the only one who had been on the move. The Detective Inspector from RUC Special Branch has gone to Belfast Airport, then talked to Flanagan at the Police College, and finally seen a prisoner in a northern English jail. The prisoner, David Burton, is visited by two detectives from Greater Manchester Police. He can help them with the Quality Street Gang, he tells them: they should keep their eyes on a businessman called Kevin Taylor. And why has Taylor never been successfully investigated? Because he has a protector... John Stalker. Stalker and his team interview Flanagan, who seems blasé, even enjoying the situation. Of course he had met the SSU men to debrief them: this was policy, they had to get the story straight. The process had been like a "Chinese Parliament", a consensus had emerged, though no one person could be said to be responsible. He denies that the unit's "firepower, speed, aggression" equated to a shoot-to-kill policy, something which had not existed, it had been a media invention. On Kinnego, he vehemently denies Thorburn and Stalker's assertion that he had knowingly let the explosives out of the hayshed. But he accepts that evidence was tampered with to protect the source − in the interests of national security: it was policy. Stalker calls it perversion of justice, and Thorburn wants to know how high up it went. But for Flanagan, he and Stalker are on the same side, even if they play by different rulebooks. Stalker may think they're like a "death squad, from some banana republic, out of control"; but this is the only way they can maintain control. They could take the bandits out, all of them, in one operation "if that was the way we worked"; so where's the shoot-to-kill policy? Stalker presses about the tape; but about this Flanagan cannot answer − in fact, he will "have to talk to somebody before he can answer any more questions". In Manchester, the two detectives present their findings to a senior officer. He in turn knocks on the door of the chief constable.

Stalker and Thorburn turn up for a formal appointment with Hermon, but find he is out of the office, and not going to be back. In Manchester, the police arrive to search Kevin Taylor's house. At RUC Special Branch, Stalker and Thorburn arrive with authorisation for the tape and its transcript. But they are told nothing can be released without Hermon's express permission. They sit down, saying they will not leave without it. The police at Taylor's house find a photograph album with a picture of Taylor and Stalker with their wives, at a black-tie event. Back in Ulster the Special Branch chief comes back with a transcript, claiming the tape has been wiped. But in the car Thorburn finds the transcript describes nothing but inaudible voices, muffled noises, the sound of wind. From his Manchester office, Stalker complains to the Regional Inspector of Constabulary who had originally proposed him. He needs the tape: he is just a hair's breadth away. He intends to finish this job. "No doubt of that, John" the Regional Inspector of Constabulary responds, and assures Stalker he will get back to him. At a police conference in Scarborough, the Home Office advisor, the Regional Inspector and the MI5 officer sit in discussion. The Regional Inspector is not happy, but they are all agreed. "It's the lesser of two evils" opines the Home Office advisor. Colin Sampson, chief constable of West Yorkshire, is shown in. They have a little job for him. Stalker receives a telephone call at his smallholding in the country. Back in his office, Sampson informs Stalker that he is under investigation and will be asked to take extended leave. Sampson will also take care of the inquiry in Northern Ireland from now on. As he leaves the building, Stalker is surrounded by a media scrum. Thorburn is alone in his office with the evening newspaper, on which it is front-page news. The young female detective from the inquiry comes in, looking for his assurance that there's no truth in the allegations. "If they'd have wanted a whitewash, they picked the wrong team, sir", she continues. "We were so close". "Aye, weren't we just" responds Thorburn, and turns out the light.

== Cast ==
- Jack Shepherd as DCC John Stalker, Greater Manchester Police
- David Calder as DCS John Thorburn, Greater Manchester Police
- T. P. McKenna as Chief Constable Sir John Hermon, Royal Ulster Constabulary
- George Shane as DCI Samuel George Flanagan, RUC Special Branch tasking and co-ordination
- Patrick Drury as Detective Inspector, RUC Special Branch
- Richard Hawley as Constable John Robinson, RUC Special Support Unit
- Tony Clarkin as Sergeant William Montgomery
- Gary Whelan as Constable David Brannigan, RUC Special Support Unit
- Ian McElhinney as Assistant Chief Constable Trevor Forbes
- Daragh O'Malley as Constable "Y", RUC Special Support Unit
- Stevan Rimkus as IRA informer
- Barry Birch as Michael Tighe
- Breffni McKenna as Martin McCauley
- Christopher Macey as Police Driver

== Production ==
=== Preparation ===
Yorkshire Television's First Tuesday documentary strand had long been considering making a programme on the Stalker Inquiry and the so-called Shoot-to-kill allegations. Kosminsky, who had producer-directed the documentaries The Falklands War: the Untold Story (1987), Cambodia: Children of the Killing Fields (1988) and Afghantsi (1988) for the strand, was keen to take the subject on. However, Kosminsky found that there was nobody he could talk to on-camera: "They were either dead, disappeared or not allowed to talk to us." Many serving or past officers were silenced by the Official Secrets Act. "The only thing to shoot was a few guilty buildings, there really was nothing." Although Kosminsky distrusted "faction", and had told the press he "hated" this "evil form", he began to think of putting the research that had been gathered into a drama format, to make best use of the contacts that had been achieved.

At the same time Zenith Productions were also considering a possible drama on the Stalker affair. Zenith was a production company that had been involved with a number of British cinema films in the mid-1980s, and was also making the Inspector Morse series for television. Zenith's plans came to the attention of Yorkshire Television's head of drama, Keith Richardson, who suggested merging the two projects; which ultimately led Yorkshire into the unusual position of commissioning its biggest and most prestigious drama of the year from an independent. From Zenith came experienced producer Nigel Stafford-Clark who had recently moved to the company, while Kosminsky was set to direct.

A turning point for the production came when the recently retired John Thorburn agreed to act as consultant. Detective Chief Superintendent Thorburn, a former head of the Manchester murder squad, had been Stalker's number two on the investigation, in charge of the day-to-day running of the inquiry, while Stalker flew in from time to time to supervise as required. Thorburn had never spoken to the press about his role, despite the best efforts of both Kosminsky for Yorkshire's First Tuesday, and Peter Taylor of the BBC's series Panorama, to persuade him. However, in January 1988 the Attorney General, Sir Patrick Mayhew, announced to Parliament that despite evidence that RUC officers had obstructed and perverted the course of justice, he had advised the Director of Public Prosecutions for Northern Ireland that it would not be in the public interest for those officers to be prosecuted, for reasons of national security. This changed Thorburn's mind. According to Kosminsky, "He didn't do it for the money... I just happened to hit him at a time when his frustration hit a peak."

Stalker himself published his own book Stalker on the subject in February 1988, and the production team considered taking out an option on it. But Michael Eaton, who they approached to dramatise it, suggested that he "did not want to write a film just centred around one policeman. It was as important to make a film about everything that led to the inquiry as it was to make a film about the inquiry itself." This was also the view of the rest of the team, and so the production went ahead on the basis of the material and contacts they already had. Given the amount of research that had already been done, and the need to be led by it, Eaton said of his role and that of writers working on similar projects "We are structuralists rather than dramatists − producers want us to supply form and structure." Dramatists also did not usually face the challenge, according to Eaton, of having all three of their main characters being called John.

It was "unconventional" to choose to have the main protagonists, Stalker and his team, not to appear at all for the first hour and three-quarters; but Eaton felt this added to the audience suspense, knowing what there was for the inquiry to find, but not knowing which paths the inquiry would take, and whether it would be uncovered. The script ultimately went to ten drafts, with Yorkshire Television's lawyers demanding the justification for every line. Stalker himself kept a distance from the project, although Eaton and Kosminsky talked to him "at some length"; but after a pre-transmission screening Stalker described it as "a faithful reproduction of Northern Ireland events". He was also said to have told his wife that he considered it "well acted and fairly accurate".

=== Filming ===
Filming began in October 1989 and lasted until Christmas, in a "relentless" shoot to achieve almost 400 scenes in ten weeks. The production was based at the Yorkshire TV facilities in Leeds, with the nearby hills of West Yorkshire standing in for the rolling countryside of County Armagh.

For Kosminsky it was his first experience of directing a television drama, an undertaking that, with a budget of £1.5 million, a cast of 125, a crew of 80, and 500 extras, was on an altogether bigger scale than the investigative documentaries he had previously made. Having never shot a frame of drama before, he described the first day as one of the scariest challenges of his life. "I just literally did not know whether I could do it." He was later to call it his "big break", and it became the first of many hard-hitting research-led dramas, including No Child of Mine (1997), Warriors (1999), The Government Inspector (2005) and The Promise (2011).

Throughout, the team was committed to put the factual research first in the making of the film, ahead of purely dramatic considerations. "We strove very hard not to sacrifice reality to the demands of good television", according to the producer Stafford-Clark.

=== Treatment of themes ===
According to Kosminsky, the objective of the programme was not "trial by television" or "naming the guilty men". Although the programme did use real names, these were all already known to the public through Stalker's book and the extensive journalism the affair had already attracted. Rather, Kosminsky said he wanted the film to reveal a lot of "new information, which is not so far in the public domain, largely from the experiences of John Thorburn"; and he said that his aim was that "whatever view the audience comes to about the rights and wrongs of the issue, they will at least know the events, the facts − what happened".

This information, according to The Times, included new details of how the operation against Dominic McGlinchy had ended in a "murderous farce", building on what had come out at the trial of RUC Constable John Robinson. More widely, the newspapers identified questions arising from what the programme presented of the role of the RUC's informant in the IRA. It appeared that, simply on his say-so, he had been able to get the RUC to target, with lethal consequences, the men he claimed were responsible for the Kinnego embankment explosion. Allegedly he had also been in a position to send these same men out on an operation to kill an RUC reservist, into the line of fire of a police ambush, making him an agent provocateur and, as Hugh Hebert put it in The Guardian, "creating the conditions in which assassination is inevitable". Darker still were questions around how the explosives used at Kinnego had got out of a hayshed that was supposedly being monitored. Had it just been an equipment failure? The film suggested that the inquiry had seriously considered the possibility, voiced by the Thorburn character, that the explosives might have been deliberately allowed out of the hayshed, and the three uniformed policemen deliberately allowed into a dangerous area leading to their deaths, to preserve the credibility within the IRA of the Special Branch source.

On the question of the alleged "shoot-to-kill" policy itself (described perhaps more precisely by Tom King, then Secretary of State for Northern Ireland, as allegations of a policy to "shoot on sight, or without proper warning, or without observing the correct procedures for the use of force"), the programme was elliptical. What it did represent was a particular SAS-style training exercise undertaken by the RUC Special Support Unit, emphasising its mantra of "Firepower, Speed, Aggression", with a briefing to the participants about what they should and shouldn't do: "1. Don't stop to think about it. Take out the terrorists before they can take out the hostages. 2. No warnings. When did you see the IRA hold up a yellow card? 3. Go for the trunk. Double tap. Your aim is to eliminate the threat completely. Now take those bastards out of action."

The programme then showed a briefing which played on the men's feelings for their colleagues murdered at Kinnego, and emphasised that Eugene Toman, Sean Burns, and Martin McCauley were the men believed "from an impeccable source" to be responsible, before knowingly concluding: "When you get the word from E4a, I want a Vehicle Control Point set up and I want these men stopped. No mistakes. Remember: firepower, speed, aggression. Show me what you've learnt..." This presentation could be read as consistent with John Stalker's view, expressed to The Times" in February 1988, that "I never did find evidence of a shoot-to-kill policy as such. There was no written instruction, nothing pinned up on a noticeboard. But there was a clear understanding on the part of the men whose job it was to pull the trigger that that was what was expected of them."

But Kosminsky was keen that the RUC side of the argument too should be fairly represented. "I've bent over backwards not to pretend that there are black and white solutions to these problems. And secondly to try and make the RUC case make sense – because they have a case." "I'm not trying to present Stalker as a white knight on a white charger and the RUC as fascists. I'm trying to present a faithful picture with the grey areas deliberately left grey." Kosminsky said of the film as a whole that "I hope it won't give any succour to terrorist forces, but I hope it will bring out the question of RUC accountability from beneath the carpet where I believe it was swept".

== Reception ==
=== Pre-broadcast ===
The film was called in by the Independent Broadcasting Authority (IBA), the regulator of British independent television at the time, for a formal screening before the full board, after IBA staff members who had been shown a preview copy flagged up concerns about the title and the extensive use of actual names in the programme. This was a highly unusual step, which had not been taken for many years. For example, similar action had not been taken before the showing of Thames Television's controversial Death on the Rock in 1988, nor for Granada Television's drama-documentary Who Bombed Birmingham? about the Birmingham Six earlier in the year.

The Board viewed the film on 17 May, a little over two weeks before the planned broadcast. In the event however, they stipulated only that the film be preceded by a caption to say that it was a drama-documentary; and that some adjustment be made to the wording of a final caption noting the statement to Parliament by the Attorney General Sir Patrick Mayhew in January 1988, that although there was evidence of RUC officers obstructing and perverting the course of justice, he had advised the Director of Public Prosecutions for Northern Ireland that due to considerations of national security a prosecution of those officers would not be in the public interest. Subject to those two provisos, the Board cleared the programme for transmission.

A preview screening was also held in Belfast on 21 May, at which the former RUC Chief Constable Sir John Hermon (who had retired in May 1989) and a number of senior RUC officers were described as having "sat impassively, and made no comment". However, in an interview on 31 May, three days before transmission, Sir John accused the film of containing false and inaccurate information and giving neither a factual nor objective portrayal of the shootings.

Within hours Ulster Television (UTV) announced that it would not show the film. UTV said it had taken legal advice, that the film might be prejudicial to legal inquests that were still suspended into the six deaths. The company refused to comment as to whether or not its decision had been linked to Sir John's criticism. The decision was attacked by the local MP for Armagh, the Social Democratic and Labour Party's (SDLP) Seamus Mallon; and also by the production company Zenith, who called it "appalling and shameful" that the people most affected by the issues in the programme would be prevented from seeing it. Kosminsky said he found it hard to understand, given the amount that had already been published on the Stalker case, how UTV could accept legal advice that the programme could prejudice juries at inquests that might not be held for at least a year.

=== Broadcast ===
Across the rest of the ITV network the film duly went out as planned on Sunday 3 and Monday 4 June, and drew an audience of 9 million viewers − as Kosminsky later noted, rather more than the 1.2 million who had watched Afghantsi, for which he felt he had put his life in danger. In Northern Ireland, UTV found that it was unable to prevent the reception of centrally-originated teletext subtitles for the programme, so blacked out the entire Oracle teletext information service for the duration of the broadcast.

As was the norm for controversial programmes at the time, the second part was followed by a half-hour studio discussion called Shoot to Kill: The Issues. Chaired by Olivia O'Leary, the regular presenter of First Tuesday, the discussion featured Kosminsky with the MPs Ian Gow of the Conservative Party (assassinated by the Provisional IRA two months later), Seamus Mallon of the SDLP, and David Trimble of the Ulster Unionist Party, along with Larry Cox of Amnesty International. Sir John Hermon was also invited to take part, but declined. Trimble particularly objected to a rhetorical line that what had been going on was "not Dixon of Dock Green − it's more like some death squad out of a banana republic", said by Stalker in the film, apparently for the benefit of the RUC eavesdroppers who were listening in. Gow and Trimble also charged that viewers would be left not knowing what had been real and what had been invented. Kosminsky retorted that there was "absolutely nothing" in the film that didn't happen, and was backed up as to its general veracity by Mallon and Cox.

=== Critical reception ===
The programme was well received. It was nominated for a BAFTA award in the Best Single Drama category, and won the 1990 award in that category from both the Royal Television Society and the Broadcasting Press Guild. The Sunday Times critic Patrick Stoddart described it as Kosminsky's "first and massively impressive drama". Chris Dunkely of the Financial Times said it was "the sort of programme that makes me want to stand up and cheer", calling it "admirable" and "remarkably even handed", with "splendid performances... and very superior camerawork and editing. Given that Kosminsky has never made a drama before it is an astonishing achievement. But above all a heartening one".

Ian Christie in the Daily Express called it remarkable and gripping, concluding that "the film was compelling, the script and direction incisive, the performances first rate". The technical qualities of the film were widely applauded. Mark Sanderson in Time Out noted the challenges the film makers had faced − a vast amount of information to convey, a huge number of real people to present with hardly any time to develop characterisation, an outcome that everybody knew − and considered that writer Michael Eaton had succeeded "triumphantly", using the tense and smoky style of a thriller to establish a nation under siege, "where the spools of the tape recorders never stop turning". Nancy Banks Smith in The Guardian compared the "sense of tension and throttling pressure" of the second part to that of a "Western by a great master... Will he get them before they get him? Even though you know he won't, you feel he might."

Critics also applauded the dramatic space given to the two contending sides. Sheridan Morley in The Times described "Stalker and Sir John Hermon of the RUC, two giants superbly played by Jack Shepherd and T. P. McKenna. Both men are fighting for what they believe to be paramount: Stalker for the objective truth, Hermon for the honour of a police force in what he describes as a jungle". According to Mark Sanderson in Time Out, "both sides are fairly represented". Patrick Stoddart in the Sunday Times agreed: T. P. McKenna as Sir John Hermon had been "forceful", and the film-makers had been "wise" to demonstrate that they "understood the stresses facing members of the Royal Ulster Constabulary" and to "set the investigation against that backdrop". In the end, according to Stoddart, it was "the cock-ups and the cover-ups that really exercised the investigators".

The Guardian's Hugo Young, writing a few months later, called the drama "a brilliant programme... seductively watchable, beautifully filmed, spaciously elaborate in its slow build-up of the characters and evidence on each side of the argument".

But for Young, dramatic balance was not enough, and the skill of execution made the problem he saw even more acute. The drama was not just making an "observation on human affairs as these illuminated the human condition", rather "it purported to be a faithful rendition of events, and the purpose of it was to conduct a forensic inquiry into the moral quality of those events." "[A]ctors playing scripted parts: Sir John Hermon, the RUC chief, Stalker himself, were displayed as if wholly and completely real." He worried that such techniques could be "capable of fatally blurring the line between what is true and what is televisually convenient".

Other critics too had niggling worries about the reality. For example, as Melinda Witstock noted later in The Times, when the film showed an MI5 chief promising to help Stalker, then reaching for a telephone and saying "We have a problem" once Stalker had gone, who could have been present to witness such a call? Or as Hugh Hebert asked in The Guardian, when the film showed a battery genuinely stolen to lure the uniformed RUC men to their deaths, but Stalker's book said the call had been made by a farmer under duress, who is the viewer to believe? For the television dramatist G. F. Newman in Time Out the film did not show the truth − it was Thorburn's truth; and Sheridan Morley cautioned that the film was a drama, not a documentary: "we have no absolute guarantee that it has given us the whole truth".

Nevertheless, along with other critics, Morley appeared to accept the main thrust of the programme, considering that the "contemptuous lack of co-operation by the RUC is indeed terrifying" and the programme usefully illustrated "the contrast between acceptable police behaviour 'on the mainland', as Stalker puts it, and in Ireland, where other laws would seem to obtain."

=== Outcomes ===
In the wider debate the broadcast generated rather little controversy or reaction. Perhaps, as Hugo Young wrote, this was because "even the most sensational television programme is dependent on the print media for an afterlife, and the sensible politician understands that by far the most effective neutering tactic is simply not to complain". Patrick Stoddart suggested, calling it a gloomy view, that perhaps simply much of the public was relatively unconcerned about the killing of perceived IRA gunmen, whether or not appropriate warnings had been shouted first.

The former RUC Chief Constable, Sir John Hermon, continued to dispute the programme's reconstruction of events. The day after transmission he told ITN's lunchtime news that the programme was "not at all accurate" and "totally without any credibility". In October 1990 he filed suit for libel against Yorkshire Television over the way he personally had been portrayed. According to Kosminsky the action eventually boiled down to "how much cold tea we had put in Jack Hermon's brandy glass". The suit was finally settled out of court in June 1992, Yorkshire Television reputedly having agreed to pay Hermon £50,000. Shoot to Kill has never been re-shown, nor released on video or DVD. ITV refused to allow it to be included in a retrospective season of Kosminsky's work at the British Film Institute in 2011.

Stalker had submitted an interim report, setting out the inquiry's progress to September 1985, which ran to 15 bound volumes. It was said to have contained over 40 draft recommendations for changes to operating procedures; and criminal or disciplinary charges against up to 40 members of the RUC. The final Sampson report was submitted in October 1986 and April 1987. As of 2011 the Stalker and Sampson reports have never been released; but in May 2010 Northern Ireland's senior coroner, who has re-opened an inquest on the killings, had his direction upheld by the High Court to have redacted versions of the reports given to the families of those shot.
