= The Promise (2011 serial) =

2011 British TV series

- Serial DVD cover
- Genre: Drama; Period drama
- Written by: Peter Kosminsky
- Directed by: Peter Kosminsky
- Starring: Claire Foy; Christian Cooke; Perdita Weeks; Itay Tiran; Katharina Schüttler; Haaz Sleiman
- Composer: Debbie Wiseman
- Country of origin: United Kingdom
- Original language: English
- No. of episodes: 4

Production
- Executive producer: David Aukin
- Producer: Hal Vogel
- Cinematography: David Higgs
- Editor: David Blackmore
- Running time: 81, 87, 83 and 105 minutes

Original release
- Network: Channel 4
- Release: 6 February – 27 February 2011

The Promise is a British television serial in four episodes written and directed by Peter Kosminsky, with music by Debbie Wiseman. It tells the story of a young woman who goes to present-day Israel and Palestine determined to find out about her soldier grandfather's involvement in the final years of Palestine under the British mandate. It premiered on Channel 4 on 6 February 2011.

== Cast ==
- Claire Foy as Erin Matthews
- Christian Cooke as Sergeant Leonard Matthews
- Itay Tiran as Paul Meyer
- Katharina Schüttler as Clara Rosenbaum
- Yvonne Catterfeld as Ziphora
- Haaz Sleiman as Omar Habash
- Ali Suliman as Abu-Hassan Mohammed
- Perdita Weeks as Eliza Meyer
- Ben Miles as Max Meyer
- Smadar Wolfman as Leah Meyer
- Holly Aird as Chris Matthews
- Hiam Abbass as Old Jawda
- Lucas Gregorowicz as Captain Richard Rowntree
- Luke Allen-Gale as Corporal Jackie Clough
- Iain McKee as Sergeant Hugh Robbins
- Paul Anderson as Sergeant Frank Nash
- Max Deacon as Private Alec Hyman
- Pip Torrens as Major John Arbuthnot
- Noa Koler as Sal'it

== Subjects depicted in the serial ==
- British liberation of Bergen-Belsen concentration camp
- King David Hotel bombing
- Ein Hawd and Ein Hod villages
- The Sergeants affair – the abduction of two British soldiers as hostages, and their killings as reprisal for the executions of Jewish guerrillas in Palestine
- Israeli–Palestinian conflict in Hebron
- Deir Yassin massacre
- Battle of Haifa (1948)
- 1948 Palestinian expulsion and flight
- Gaza–Israel conflict
- House demolition in the Israeli–Palestinian conflict

== Plot ==
=== Part 1 ===
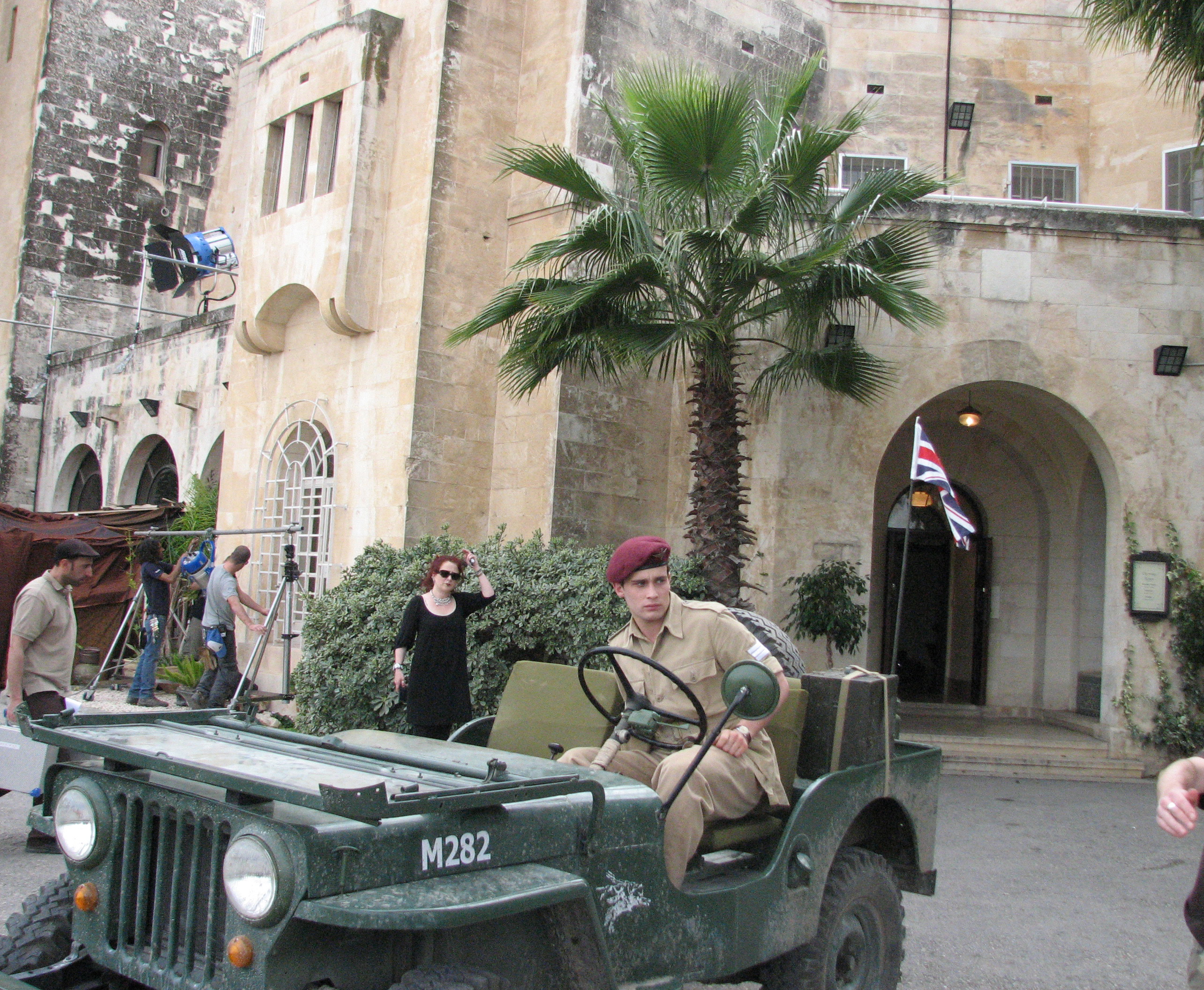
On the set in 2010

18-year-old Erin Matthews is a about to start her gap year. She is taken reluctantly to see her grandfather Len, in his eighties, who is in hospital paralysed by a stroke. Erin hardly knows him, but whilst helping her mother to clear out his flat she finds a diary of his time in the 6th Airborne Division in British Mandate Palestine after the Second World War. Her mother wants to throw it away, but she surreptitiously keeps it. She decides to take up her best friend Eliza's offer to spend time in Israel, while Eliza undergoes basic training for her compulsory Israeli military service. As they fly out Erin starts to read the diary, and becomes fascinated; it opens with Len describing "the worst day of his life so far" – the horror of liberating Bergen-Belsen concentration camp. Thereafter the series intercuts between the two stories as they develop, hers in 2005 and his in the 1940s.

Len's unit is posted to Stella Maris base near Haifa, as part of the forces keeping the fragile peace between Arabs and the growing Jewish population. Their first job is to round up Jewish refugees coming ashore from a ship, who are taken to a detention centre. The forced showers and captivity behind wire fences remind Len of what he saw in Germany.

Returning to the beach Len finds a straggler, and is about to let her go when they are spotted by a passing patrol. Len is reprimanded; his commander emphasises the danger of Arab insurrection if Jewish immigration is not controlled. At the City Hospitality Club in Haifa, Len's corporal Jackie Clough introduces him to two Jewish girls: Ziphora and Clara. Clara explains that the club's purpose is to generate goodwill for the Jews, and that she is paid to be there. Meanwhile Len leads a search of the kibbutz at Qiryat Haiyim, but finds nothing. He is told that the entire secretariat at Stella Maris is Jewish and leaks are very common.

Clara invites him home for tea, where her father tries to get him to talk about Stella Maris. Len's superior Rowntree encourages Len to contact the Jewish underground, suggesting that a crowd at a rally would be a safer place to meet them than Clara's flat. However, when Len is approached, his contact is shot dead by the British forces policing the rally: Len has been set up. Out on armoured patrol a chamberpot is emptied over the soldiers. Then at the base several of Len's men are shot, some in the back while they are hosing down the vehicles, in a raid by Jewish militants. Len goes to see Clara, whose father apologises for what has happened, but tells him he is no longer welcome. Clara however follows Len down the stairs and embraces him.

Meanwhile, in 2005 Erin is staying with Eliza's well-to-do family, who live in Caesarea in a beach-front villa with a pool. Eliza takes Erin shopping and clubbing in Tel Aviv, cut short when Erin's epilepsy is triggered by flashing lights in the club. Erin meets Eliza's brother Paul, described by Eliza as "crazy", who left the army transformed into a peace activist. Eliza's father is a former general who criticised the occupation and is now a leading liberal. Nevertheless he and Paul clash over politics. According to Paul, his father's liberalism misleads people into thinking Israel is a normal country like their own; he says the truth is that it is dominated and led by former military leaders. Erin asks Paul to take her to see the grave of one of Len's comrades, who in the diary has just been killed in the raid of the Jewish militants on the base. At the CWGC cemetery she finds the graves of two more names from the diary: Sergeants Robbins and Nash, who at that point in the diary are still alive.

Paul takes her through a checkpoint into the Occupied Territories. In Nablus Erin hears him addressing a meeting of Combatants for Peace together with Omar, a former member of the al-Aqsa Martyrs' Brigades. Afterward the two shake hands, and Paul drives Omar back to the Israeli side of the line. They are waved through the checkpoint, but Omar goes back to remonstrate with the border guards about a couple being split up, and is detained. Paul condemns the checkpoints as just a way to make Palestinian life difficult, and points to a stretch of the separation barrier where there is a Palestinian village on each side of the wall, arguing that a terrorist might live in either village. They go to a café, but when Paul goes back for his wallet, the building is blown apart by a suicide bomb.

=== Part 2 ===
Len disciplines soldiers who are abusing his company's Palestinian servant. Later at the club, Clough teases him that Clara is seeking a passport from marrying him. Len takes Clara home; there is no-one in, so she takes him to bed, asking him to stay longer, but he has to attend a meeting. The meeting, at the King David Hotel in Jerusalem, is a briefing on "Operation Bulldog", the upcoming cordon and search of Tel Aviv. There is an explosion outside. Some civilians in a neighbouring room come to the balcony, and Len encourages them to move back from the window, but there is a bigger explosion. When Len regains consciousness, he sees that a wing of the building is destroyed.

In 2005 rescue teams arrive to help the wounded from the café explosion. At the hospital Erin finds Paul, just as his father arrives. Paul is alive, but his leg, arm and eye are bandaged.

Len digs a dead woman out of the rubble of the King David Hotel. That night, Len rounds on Clara for having known in advance and trying to protect him. Clara protests she was only trying to show that she loved him. At the base, the servant alerts Len that Alec Hyman, one of his men who is Jewish, is being given a "regimental bath" in retribution—he is being viciously scrubbed. Len breaks it up, and later thanks the servant, learning his name: Mohammed. Operation Bulldog gets underway. Len's platoon storms a house where one of the King David bombers had been hiding. But he has already been tipped off and gone. The owners protest that they had been forced to harbour "Irgun" members, but they are nevertheless taken away, and the British blow up their house. Mesheq Yagur kibbutz is searched, and Len discovers a substantial arms cache hidden in a room below a children's merry-go-round. Returning to base, the soldiers are serenaded by schoolchildren handing out flowers. Rowntree explains that they are anemones, or kalaniot in Hebrew: "red for the paratrooper's beret; black for his heart". Len gives the bunch to Mohammed, only to be told he has now put Mohammed under an obligation, and Mohammed will be duty-bound to offer him dinner. Subsequently he visits Mohammed and his family for dinner. They take a group photograph outside.

Paul's mother complains that the suicide bombers at the café are 'animals'. Paul replies that she should tell Erin about some of the 'animals' who blew up the King David Hotel, including her own father.

Erin is on the point of going home, but reads the last page of Len's diary and finds with it, in an envelope, a key. Len is facing prison, and has let down everyone who trusted him, wishing he could return the key to Mohammed. Haunted by this, and knowing her grandfather has been unhappy all his life, Erin decides to stay. Looking up Omar's telephone number in Paul's phone, she gets Omar to take her to Ein Hawd, which was the location of Mohammed's house, and finds that that village is now Ein Hod, a Jewish artistic centre. She is told that the Palestinians left in 1948, but some had returned to found a new Ein Hawd in what had been their orchards above the old village. An old man agrees to let them drive him, and they identify what had been Mohammed's house. He thanks Erin for taking him back, even though it had been painful. He is able to give Omar a Hebron address for the family, although when Erin asks Omar to take her, he suggests that Paul might be a better guide.

Erin and Eliza visit Eliza's grandfather. He is unapologetic, and tells them that his father, mother, sister and brother had all died in German camps. He says that his generation had been determined that the Jewish people would never again capitulate in the face of genocide, and want to secure land that could always be safe. He explains that the British stood in their way, so they wiped them out.

Len and Jackie and another soldier are off duty and driving through town when they are ambushed. Len reaches for his revolver, but two men with handguns shoot all three. As Len and Jackie struggle for their lives, they are ignored by onlookers sitting in cafés.

=== Part 3 ===
In hospital, Len shows compassion to Avram Klein (a Jewish militant who has been shot after shooting three British policemen), even after an attempt to free him. Rowntree asks Len to persuade Klein to appeal to the Privy Council to avoid his execution. Len finds Klein in solitary confinement in Acre, but he is unwilling to appeal, saying that every movement needs its martyrs.

Meanwhile Len has started giving Mohammed's son Hassan tuition in mathematics. Clara is getting hostile glances from people who think she is fraternising with the enemy.

Erin is dropped by taxi at Abu Dis, where Omar lives, which is near the separation wall. He is playing cards on the roof, and non-plussed when Erin says he had agreed to give her a driving lesson. He also tells Erin that he is a Palestinian Christian. In the car Erin admits that she is forbidden to drive because of her epilepsy. Omar drives back to Caesarea, where Erin tempts him into the house, and then into the pool. They are starting to kiss when Eliza's parents appear. Eliza's father is formally polite; his wife looks very unhappy, and a strained dinner follows. Paul also seems not entirely happy. Eliza's parents start to have a serious talk with Erin, but she is struck by another fit. When she recovers, Paul comes to see her; she senses that he is upset with her, but he denies it.

Arriving at Clara's flat, Len is perturbed to find it apparently deserted. Clara is in the bath; much of her hair has been torn out, and she has been daubed with oil and feathers. Len comforts her, but later needs to leave for an appointment. Clara can't believe he still does not trust her. Len relents and tells her everything, including the name of the spy that he, Robbins and Nash are going to meet.

At the meeting they are ambushed; their Jewish informant is led away, and Len and the two sergeants are abducted. A purported British Army major apologises to Len that it has been a ruse, to determine whether Robbins is a spy. But Len is unconvinced, and he is dragged off to join the others, being held in a hole under a trapdoor, with just enough room for an oxygen cylinder. Days pass, and Len is again taken to the "major", who tells Len he was indeed a wartime officer, in the Palestine Jewish Brigade, and had then spirited Jews out of the camps onto boats. He asks Len to join, but Len is not interested. Days later, Len is dragged out again. Unhooded and in the open, he expects to be shot, but finds he has been released. He takes Rowntree back to the factory, but Robbins and Nash are gone. Two miles away, Robbins and Nash are found dead, hanging from trees. A message hung around Robbins's neck says he has been executed in reprisal for the "illegal killing" of Avram Klein. Sappers declare the ground clear, but when a member of the Palestine Police starts to cut down the body, it explodes. Len returns to Clara's flat in fury, but she has gone. Clara's father apologies for his daughter's views. Len confesses everything to Rowntree. Later, talking to Clough, he suffers an epileptic fit. Robbins and Nash are buried with military honours.

Erin is shocked to read about Len's fit. She shows Paul a press cutting about Robbins and Nash; he remembers it, and says it was what broke the British will to fight. Paul kisses her, and she wakes up the next morning in Paul's bed.

From a bus on the way to Hebron she rings Omar and asks if he could meet her there. At a military checkpoint a liberal Israeli guide is explaining to a group that part of the city has been closed off as a "sterile zone"; he is being barracked by an orthodox settler with a megaphone. Erin slips past into the zone. She meets Palestinian schoolgirls walking home from school. The girls are verbally abused and then stoned by some Jewish boys, while IDF soldiers watch. The group point her to a house that matches her address, where she is met by a Jewish orthodox woman and led to a room where orthodox men are eating. Erin starts to explain her quest, when two IDF soldiers arrive, brought by the daughter, to lead Erin away. Behind her the man rebukes the woman. Outside, she is bundled into an IDF vehicle. Erin secretly sends a text from her phone.

=== Part 4 ===
Erin is to be questioned at the IDF base when Paul appears, and greets his former colleagues. He tells her the army is there to protect the settlers, not to keep the peace. Erin wakes in the night and is almost shot by a sniper bullet. Paul has his ex-comrades throw him a gun, and he shoots into the night, justifying his actions as loyalty. The next morning, they find a woman who is the grand-daughter of Mohammed's cousin. Settlers drop broken glass onto her yard from what had been her grandfather's house. The orthodox woman from the previous day arrives to taunt her. Erin tries to intervene, but Paul leads her away, saying it would make things worse. Paul tells Erin that Mohammed's family is now in Gaza, which is an unreachable war-zone.

Back in 1947, a crowd is celebrating the UN partition resolution which will create a Jewish state. Searching for the source of the Kol Zion underground broadcasts, Len's men raid some flats; Clough's gun ‘accidentally’ misfires. Len stumbles, but Clough catches Ziphora, his girlfriend, but lets her go. Later, Len beats him, and he admits to having told her everything – just as he told Clara about Robbins and Nash. Len visits Mohammed and advises him to move somewhere safer, because the British will not protect him, but Mohammed will not leave.

Erin feels out of place at a party with Eliza's friends. On a laptop, she watches news of another suicide bombing. She argues with Paul, who does not understand why this is all so important to her.

Len is driving Mohammed's son Hassan back from a maths exam. He turns down a track to investigate a column of smoke from the village of Deir Yassin. Jewish fighters are going from house to house, throwing grenades and shooting the occupants. Men are being forced into the village square and shot. One of the fighters is Clara. She asks him to join her, but Len turns and leaves. He later confronts Rowntree, but Rowntree is under a direct order that British lives are not to be risked protecting the Arabs.

Erin goes to see Omar, but he too refuses to help. She shows him the key, and he explains its importance to displaced Palestinian families, and then shows her the key to his own uncle's house in Jaffa. He agrees to take her to Gaza.

Len's platoon is in Haifa, stationed between the Jewish and Arab-controlled areas, overlooked by armed Jewish irregulars. They are ordered to pull back, but Len orders them to hold the position to prevent Jewish mortar attack on the souk. Len goes to find Rowntree, but he is gone and the last personnel is evacuating. The roads are clogged with Arab refugees. Mohammed insists that the Arab armies will protect them; but Len tells him that they will come too late: the Jews will arrive by nightfall. The family leaves home and Len drives them to the docks, where the Royal Navy is taking people to Acre. Mohammed commands Hassan to keep the house key safe, because one day they will return. Hassan goes missing in the crowds, and Len promises to go back and find him, persuading Mohammed to get his wife and daughter to safety. Len returns to his men and fills a bag with grenades and ammunition, ordering Alec to take the men to the docks.

Erin and Omar are led through a tunnel into Gaza. A taxi takes them to a house of a cousin of Mohammed's, where relatives have gathered for the funeral for his daughter, who had been the suicide bomber of the previous night. Erin sits by herself on the roof, overlooked by a military watch-tower. A young girl Samira pulls her in, miming that it is not safe. That night there is shooting; Erin comforts the girl. Later, she is woken by arguing from downstairs. The son, who is with Hamas, is brandishing a gun and telling Omar, a Fatah member, to go. But the house is raided by Israeli soldiers. Omar and the son run off, while Erin and the family are confined in a bedroom. An IDF officer takes Erin's name and address, while the son is marched away. In the morning, the IDF are searching the house. Eliza appears to deal with Erin, called as a favour to her father.

Len finds Hassan fighting with a group of Arabs, under fire from a sniper. Len takes charge, only to find that the sniper is Clough, who has joined the Jewish militants. He confiscates his rifle and lets him go. Len agrees to stay and fight, if Hassan will go to the docks. But as Hassan sets out across open ground, he is hit by a bullet. Before he dies, he asks Len to promise to give the key back to his father. Back at the docks, Len tries to find Mohammed, but is arrested by two military policemen, who had been tipped off by Alec to make sure Len gets home.

IDF soldiers take Samira for a human shield when they go to occupy the brother's house. As Samira becomes frantic, Erin suggests that they take her also. They are confined in the room of a bedridden old woman, who tells Erin she learned English from the British. She shows Erin a photograph; it is the photograph of Len with Mohammed and his family. She is Mohammed's daughter Jawda, with fond memories of Len, but she says her father was angry with him for many years as he failed to bring Hassan back. Erin produces the key, and as soldiers come in she clutches it in her hand. The IDF lay explosives in the house. Erin finds a toolbox, and chains herself and Samira to a pillar. The IDF commander tells Eliza to get a cutter, and she is freed. Outside, Erin finds Jawda being loaded into an ambulance, as the houses are blown up. Erin retrieves some trinkets in a box and the photograph album, and gives them to Jawda. However, an IDF soldier takes away the box. Erin starts to remonstrate, but is seized by another fit. Later, Erin is back in Caesarea, gathering her things. She thanks Eliza's parents for her stay, and Paul hopes she may come back one day.

As she flies home, Erin turns to the last page of Len's diary. He is leaving Palestine as prisoner on a Royal Navy ship. He writes that the Jewish state has been born in violence and cruelty, and worries that it will not thrive. For himself, he says all he has to look forward to is a long prison term and a dishonourable discharge. He wishes that one day he can return the key to Mohammed, though he is not sure he could face him.

At the airport, Erin surprises her mother with the intensity of her embrace. In the hospital, she tells Len she has given Mohammed's daughter the key. He holds her hand as he starts to cry.

== Production ==
=== Research ===
The idea for The Promise arose from the 1999 drama Warriors, Kosminsky's sympathetic portrayal of British troops peacekeeping in central Bosnia in 1992–93, their hands tied by an impossible mandate. A former soldier wrote to its executive producer Jane Tranter at the BBC, suggesting she should do a film about the forgotten British soldiers who had been in Palestine.

Tranter passed the letter to Kosminsky, who initially put it to one side. However, after completing The Project in 2002, Kosminsky presented the subject as a possible theme for a future drama, and the BBC agreed to support research on it. The BBC's Sarah Barton, subsequently assisted by Sarah MacFarlane, began making contacts through regimental groups and the Palestine Veterans Association, ultimately conducting detailed interviews with 82 veterans, many of them speaking about things they had never told their wives and families. These oral accounts were compared with archive material in books and from the Red Cross, the National Archives and the Imperial War Museum, including the weekly military intelligence digests. Kosminsky was particularly struck by the house demolitions carried out by the British, and with what other parallels might exist with the present. The research team contacted newly emerging groups of critical IDF veterans, Breaking the Silence and Combatants for Peace. According to Kosminsky, it took him eleven months to read all the research, including over 40 books that researchers had prepared for him, while thinking how to distill it into a workable drama.

=== Characters and construction ===
Kosminsky says that his overriding aim was to present the experience of the 100,000 British soldiers who served in Palestine, "to remind us all of what happened". After leaving Palestine nobody had wanted to remember, the veterans had been "shunned"; they had "returned home to find the nation that wanted nothing to do with them", with no memorial, and were denied even "the right to march to the Cenotaph in formation". Most found it incredibly hard to talk about their experiences. "I was determined that their story be told." This was always his aim for the drama, to "honour the original letter sent to the BBC", so this was always going to be the path of Len's journey. Overwhelmingly, the veterans told a similar story: they had started out "incredibly pro-Jewish" but they had shifted their allegiance and by the end "were feeling a great deal of sympathy for the Arabs". "A big change came in the final months, as they saw what would happen to the Palestinians, and realised both sides were to be abandoned to a war." "It was always going to be necessary for us to faithfully reflect this in our drama," "I either had to reflect it or abandon the project." The series was led by what had come out of the interviews, what the soldiers had said and felt, and what they had actually experienced, rather than wider historical events with which rank-and-file soldiers had little contact. Of all the reactions to the series, Kosminsky said what meant the most to him was a letter from a veteran, now 85 years old: "You did what you said you would. Thank you so much."

The character of Erin was influenced by his two teenage daughters, one of whom has epilepsy. Kosminsky felt the trait wasn't often shown on screen unless it was a major plot point, so he liked the idea of showing "an eighteen-year-old girl who is trying to live a normal life, despite the fact she occasionally had epileptic fits; and how other people cope with that as well". For personal reasons, Kosminsky had long wanted to explore the idea of a young person gradually coming to appreciate "the young man inside the shell of an older, sick man", to the extent that he sees the drama as an unconventional love story, capped when Paul tells Erin that the young Len of the diary no longer exists. Erin's passionate response "He does to me, he does to me!" was for Kosminsky perhaps the most important line in the whole film. The casual relationship Erin has with Eliza, "the way they talk, the way they react, their limited attention span" was very much drawn from his experience of his daughters and their friends, and he felt that the combination of naivety and flinty assertiveness were not atypical of an "eighteen-year-old kid from London", particularly given an emotionally rather unsympathetic upbringing. It was also important to make the character contrast with the "endlessly heroic and gentlemanly" Len, so it was intentional that she should be harder to like. However, he hoped that the audience would be won over as they came to understand the character, and that having the audience make this journey would make more powerful what he saw as her later bravery and single-mindedness.

Erin's emotional journey intentionally parallels the 1940s arc, because at the heart of it is her increasing engagement with Len. "She becomes obsessed with him... she feels what he's feeling... so, by the time we get to Gaza, she patterns herself on what she thinks he would have done." Through the modern story, Kosminsky wanted to show how the past can have consequences for the present, and that having left "chaos, political confusion, bloodshed and war", Britain has a responsibility for what happens today. "It is our problem, at least in part, and we should take some responsibility for it". He also writes that what struck him most is a question: "How did we get from there to here?" In 1945 the Jewish plight had the sympathy of most of the world, but "just 60 years later, Israel is isolated, loathed and feared in equal measure by its neighbours, finding little sympathy outside America for its uncompromising view of how to defend its borders and secure its future. How did Israel squander the compassion of the world within a lifetime?" This is what The Promise sets out to explore. But "It does not help anyone by claiming that good and justice are on one side only. If it were that simple, we would have already found a solution. There are rights and truths on each side, that compete with each other. You can not have everything on one side or the other, everything is meshed together" ... "There are no good guys and bad guys in this sad situation and we have tried very hard to show pluses and minuses on both sides." "I would be very sad if someone were to consider the series as partisan." What he hoped to create was a kind of unstable equilibrium, so that audiences would find their sympathies shifting, repeatedly, from one side to the other.

=== Pre-production, further research, and finance ===
As of 2006 the project had the working title Palestine and was to be made for the BBC by Carnival Films, best known as makers of the Poirot series for ITV. However, Kosminsky had grown increasingly estranged from the BBC, later saying that film-makers no longer saw "that flash of mischief" when pitching ideas. "I don't think we can say the BBC bottled it... [However] it seems to have lost its nerve for making challenging drama... drama that gets it into political and legal hot water." The BBC agreed to sell its interest and let the project go into turnaround — for a generously low rate according to Kosminsky – and in 2007 he secured an exclusive deal with Daybreak Pictures, run by Channel 4's former head of film David Aukin, with whom he had previously made The Government Inspector (2005) and Britz (2007).

At this stage the treatment ran to 180 pages, with many scenes described in detail. Researchers continued to conduct interviews to enrich the story. Kosminsky flew to Israel with David Aukin, to visit places that would feature in the story, including the normally closed-off Deir Yassin, accompanied by modern Israeli historians organised by their pre-production partners, an Israeli documentary film company. Benny Morris let Kosminsky read a pre-publication proof copy of his book 1948; and from a recent PhD student of Motti Golani at Haifa University Kosminsky heard about the city hospitality clubs, still a stigmatised subject, which shaped the background for Clara in the story. Scripts followed quickly, and by mid-2008 Channel 4 announced its backing for the project.

Daybreak had initially costed the drama at £8 million, which with some trimming they had been able to pare back to £7 million. Channel 4 committed £4 million, roughly in line with the channel's hourly rate for prestige drama. Other sources of funding were more difficult. In France, a deal giving Canal + first-run subscription broadcast rights, with free-to-air rights on ARTE a year later, was negotiated by Daybreak's long-standing production contact Georges Campana, bringing in a further £1 million. SBS (a frequent co-producer with ARTE) secured Australian rights, and some top-up funding was obtained from the EU media fund. However pre-sale negotiations for America and Germany ran into the sand. Eventually, having put back filming from an original autumn 2009 start, and with everything else ready to go, Kosminsky went back to Channel 4 and said that without another £1 million the series wasn't going to happen. Exceptionally, Channel 4 agreed the extra funding, and filming started in Israel in early 2010 under the revised title Homeland, beginning with the period scenes at Stella Maris. Channel 4 presented its support as part of a £20 million investment in drama, also including This is England '86 and Any Human Heart, made possible by cancellation of the £50 million per series it was previously spending on Big Brother.

=== Filming ===
Filming was entirely in Israel, with a predominantly local crew and through the Israeli production company Lama Films; something unusual for a UK television drama production. According to Kosminsky they also looked at Morocco, Cyprus, Southern Spain and Tunisia, and could have recreated the 1940s sequences there; but nowhere else would have replicated the "buildings, range of cultures or topography" of modern-day Israel. According to The Guardian:

Over the course of a long career Kosminsky has become adept at turning one country into another: "I used the Czech Republic for Bosnia, Kenya for Somalia, Ghana for Liberia, Morocco for Iraq, India for Pakistan and Leeds for Northern Ireland." This time, though, there was no faking it. "Israel looks like nowhere else: the Bauhaus architecture in Tel Aviv, the physiognomy of its people, who come from all over the world, and most of all the Wall. I knew I couldn't recreate those things. The trouble was, it is virtually unknown for a British TV crew to shoot in Israel. We were starting from zero."

The early scene of the flat in Leeds was created in an Israeli studio. Everything else was shot on location in and around Jerusalem, Haifa, Tel Aviv, Jaffa, Caesarea, Acre, Givat Brenner, Ein Hod, Peqi'in, Ramla and Beit Jimal in a 68-day schedule involving 180 different locations. Ben Gurion Airport stood in for Heathrow, and the bombed rubble of the King David Hotel was filmed against a blue screen in a car park in Petah Tikva. Part of the Old City in Jerusalem stood in for Nablus in the West Bank, the Hebron-set scenes were filmed in Acre, while Gaza was represented by the Israeli-Arab town of Jisr al-Zarqa. The paratroopers' base at Stella Maris had been a challenge to find, but eventually the monastery at Beit Jimal was used and proved very accommodating. Period military vehicles were also a challenge to source without shipping them in at prohibitive expense; the tracked armoured vehicle used in the series was an amalgam of parts from five different vehicles found in a junkyard, cobbled together into one that worked. A faux Israeli checkpoint was built entirely from scratch.

Filming used conventional Super 16mm film, which was then processed and edited in England. The cinematographer, David Higgs, had been keen to try the new Red One high resolution digital camera. However, the team were concerned by the potentially limited contrast ratio using digital – a serious consideration in strong Mediterranean light – and that its potential bulkiness might inhibit Kosminsky's trademark hand-held cameras following the action. It was also felt that relying on comparatively simple well-known technology would be sensible operating so far from home. Ironically, however, the reliance on film led to a number of scenes having to be re-mounted after fogging went undetected for a week when it was impossible to get daily film rushes back to London because of the air travel disruption caused by the eruption of the Eyjafjallajökull volcano in Iceland. Extensive use was also made of CGI and digital post-production, including for the café explosion, the destruction at the King David Hotel, and the refugee ship of would-be immigrants. A particular challenge was how to realise the events at Bergen-Belsen. The film-makers considered and rejected a number of options, including live-action and CGI, before reluctantly deciding to fall back on black-and-white library footage from the Imperial War Museum in London, only to come to the view that the resulting sequence had more artistic and moral power than anything they might have been able to create.

== Reception ==
=== United Kingdom ===
Overnight ratings for The Promise were 1.8 million for the first episode, followed by 1.2 million, 1.3 million, and 1.2 million for the subsequent episodes. Consolidated ratings, which include time-shifted and online viewing, generally added about a further 0.5 million.

The first episode was reviewed widely and generally very positively, although Andrew Anthony in The Observer was more critical and A.A. Gill of The Sunday Times was unimpressed. The Daily Express called it "...a little burning bush of genius in the desert of well-intentioned TV dramas...", The Daily Telegraph said the programme would richly deserve any Baftas that came its way, and Caitlin Moran in The Times called it "almost certainly the best drama of the year". By the second episode Andrew Billen, writing in The Times, was concerned that both Len and Erin were meeting from the Arabs a "little too much kindness for the comfort of all of us hoping that Kosminsky will parcel out recriminations in exactly equal proportions"; but nonetheless applauded the "immersive and emotional" quality of the series.

The serial as a whole was praised by Christina Patterson in The Independent who said it was "...beautifully shot and extremely well written. It is also extremely balanced..."; and Rachel Cooke in the New Statesman and The Observer, where she said it was "...the best thing you are likely to see on TV this year, if not this decade". There was also praise from Stephen Kelly in Tribune, Harriet Sherwood and Ian Black, Jerusalem correspondent and Middle East editor of The Guardian respectively, and David Chater, previewing the serial for The Times, who called it courageous and applauded its lack of didacticism.

London free newspaper Metro felt that the third episode dragged, having warmly received the first two parts; but then praised the series as a whole. Previewing the final episode, The Times said it was "ambitious" and "packs a considerable punch"; Time Out chose the programme as its pick of the day, and gave it a four-star recommendation, calling it "brave filmmaking and a brave, entirely successful commission". Andrew Anthony in The Observer acknowledged some flaws, but found it still "an exceptional drama".

A press attaché at the Israeli embassy in London, however, condemned the drama to The Jewish Chronicle as the worst example of anti-Israel propaganda he had seen on television, saying it "created a new category of hostility towards Israel". The Zionist Federation and the Board of Deputies of British Jews both also lodged letters of complaint. The Jewish Chronicle itself took the view that rather than "attempt to tell both sides of what is a complex and contentious story", the series had turned out to be "a depressing study in how to select historical facts to convey a politically loaded message". Writing in The Independent, novelist Howard Jacobson said that in The Promise, "Just about every Palestinian was sympathetic to look at, just about every Jew was not. While most Palestinians might fairly be depicted as living in poor circumstances, most Israeli Jews might not be fairly depicted as living in great wealth... Though I, too, have found Palestinians to be people of immense charm, I could only laugh in derision at The Promise every time another shot of soft-eyed Palestinians followed another shot of hard-faced Jews." In an interview with Jacobson during Jewish Book Week 2011, Jonathan Freedland, having seen the first episode of The Promise, said Kosminsky used antisemitic tropes, misrepresenting Israel and Zionism as being a consequence of the Holocaust, whose imagery he had abused. Historian Professor David Cesarani accused Kosminsky of "deceit...massive historical distortion": omitting the Balfour Declaration's promise of a Jewish national home; downplaying selfish British geo-strategy; and exculpating the British, "chief architects of the Palestine tragedy...making responsible...only the Jews"; turning a tricorn conflict of British, Arabs and Jews "into a one-sided rant". On the other hand, Liel Leibovitz, writing for American online Jewish magazine Tablet, took the view that, "contrary to these howls of discontent, the show is a rare and riveting example of telling Israel's story on screen with accuracy, sensitivity, and courage".

The broadcasting regulator Ofcom received 44 complaints about the series, but concluded in a ten-page report that it did not breach its code of conduct. Viewers complained that the drama was antisemitic, used upsetting footage of concentration camps, incited racial hatred, was biased against Israel and presented historical inaccuracies. But, Ofcom said: "Just because some individual Jewish and Israeli characters were portrayed in a negative light does not mean the programme was, or was intended to be, antisemitic... Just as there were Jewish/Israeli characters that could be seen in a negative light, so there were British and Palestinian characters that could also be seen in a negative light." Delivering his first keynote speech to the Royal Television Society in London on 23 May 2011, David Abraham, the Chief Executive of Channel 4, said: "At a time when other broadcasters are perhaps more conservative, it's more important than ever for Channel 4 to challenge the status quo, stimulate debate, take risks and be brave... I can think of no better example of how we continue to do that than in Peter Kosminsky's recent examination of the Israel/Palestine question in The Promise".

The Promise was nominated for both the British Academy Television Awards 2011 and the Royal Television Society Programme Awards 2011 in the category of best drama serial, but was beaten by two other productions broadcast on Channel 4, the TV adaptation of William Boyd's Any Human Heart and the drama serial Top Boy. Interviewed in The Jewish Chronicle, Any Human Heart's director, Michael Samuels, said about The Promise, "I respect it for having a point of view. You have to have that, otherwise you are not writing".

The Promise also received a nomination at the Banff World Television Festival, for Best Mini-Series of 2010/11. On 10 May 2011, at the One World Media Awards in London, The Promise won Best Drama of 2010/11.

=== France ===
The subscription channel Canal+ aired the drama under the title The Promise: Le Serment over four weeks starting 21 March 2011, in a prime-time Monday evening slot that it tends to use for more serious or historical drama. Libération called it "admirable", praising the "excellent director" for telling a "tragedy in two voices", while "pointing the finger at neither one side nor the other". Les Echos called it "exceptional, stunningly intelligent" and said the considered dialogue and tense, serious acting fully measured up to the ambition of the film. TV magazine Télérama called it "remarkable", confronting its subject "head on". Le Figaro said it was "magnificently filmed and masterfully acted... perfectly balanced... great television", and gave it a maximum rating of four out of four. The Nouvel Obs and Le Journal du Dimanche both identified the series as reflecting the viewpoint of the "British pro-Palestinian left", but the latter praised it as "nevertheless a historical fiction useful for understanding an intractable conflict", while the former commended its "epic spirit, rare on television". Le Monde gave the series an enthusiastic preview in its TéléVisions supplement along with a lengthy interview with the director. Le Point predicted Kosminsky would receive a "shower of awards...[a]nd also gibes". However, La Croix's reviewer was more hostile, considering that although there was "no doubt that the film ought to be seen", it "cannot be mistaken for a history lesson but a great partisan fiction", marred by bias and an "embarrassing" representation of Jews. L'Express considered it beautiful but too long.

A letter of protest to the channel was written by the President of the Representative Council of French Jewish Institutions (CRIF), arguing that "the viewer sees the Israeli-Palestinian conflict, however complex, only as a consequence of violence and cruelty of the Jews, who are represented as so extreme that if any empathy towards them is excluded". CRIF did not ask for the broadcast to be pulled, but rather to be balanced with a programme taking a different position, and for the fictional nature of the series to be made clear. The Jewish Chronicle (JC) reported that CRIF president Richard Prasquier had met the president of Canal+, Bertrand Meheut. Prasquier reportedly told him that such a series "could only fan the flames of antisemitic violence" and Meheut reportedly promised that viewers would be provided with balanced information about the issue; The JC reported that Canal+ had agreed to broadcast a caption reading "The Promise is fiction" before each episode. The Confederation of French Jews and Friends of Israel (CJFAI) issued a call (publicised by CRIF) for a demonstration against the programme, which it described as "a vitriolic saga of murderous disinformation". The demonstration in front of the Canal+ offices on the night of the first showing was reported to have attracted a few hundred people, with CRIF represented by its vice-president. The Israeli embassy in Paris made no comment.

Arte announced it would show the series over two Friday evenings, on 20 and 27 April 2012.

=== Australia ===
The serial was shown by SBS in a Sunday evening slot from 27 November to 18 December 2011. Critical reaction was positive, with The Australian selecting part one as its pick of the week, calling its character development and performances "compelling", and saying that the series "offers insight into the history of one of the world's most conflicted places". Press agency AAP wrote that "Foy shines amid a powerful storyline" and learns "a few harsh truths". The Sydney Morning Herald trailed the serial as "ambitious... both bracingly original and wonderfully gripping", offering a "profound veracity". The SMH's Doug Anderson called the serial "the best drama series on television at present... This is powerful stuff, distilling enormous difficulties to a deeply personal level", and the newspaper selected the series for its annual television review, writing that it was "gripping... it dazzled via a raw and complex portrait of conflict in the Middle East... Kosminsky's storytelling was mesmerising".

There was a campaign by Palestinian solidarity groups to encourage support for the series. The editor of the Australians for Palestine website wrote, "Although people had written to SBS commending it for showing "The Promise", [Managing Director] Mr Ebeid received only one supportive letter addressed to him personally...Many more are needed in defence of the series for the hearing."

The Australia/Israel & Jewish Affairs Council and the Friends of Israel Western Australia urged viewers to complain, reiterating negative comments that had been made in the UK. Senator Glenn Sterle joined the criticism, calling the series "derogatory" and "anti-Semitic". In January 2012 the Executive Council of Australian Jewry (ECAJ) filed a 31-page complaint with the SBS claiming that the series "unrelentingly portrays the entire Jewish presence throughout the country, including modern-day Israel, as an act of usurpation by Jews who, without exception, are aliens, predators and thieves and who enforce their usurpation by brutal, racist policies akin to those inflicted by the Nazis upon the Jewish people", and compared it to the infamous Nazi film Jud Süss. The ECAJ rejected the relevance or validity of the British Ofcom inquiry, and called for a halt to DVD sales while the complaint is investigated. The Australian Jewish News headlined this complaint as "TV series The Promise akin to Nazi propaganda".

The Australian Jewish Democratic Society stated "We agree with the ECAJ that the Jewish characters portrayed are generally unsympathetic in comparison with the Arab characters. But we fundamentally disagree that this bias amounts to anti-Semitism... in our view The Promise is a worthwhile contribution to the debates about the intractable conflict". It also made available the full text of the OfCom decision as a contribution to open debate, prior to which only parts had been available because Ofcom had not published it.

The SBS Complaints Committee met on 17 January, and found no grounds that the programme had breached its code. In particular, it found "that the characterisations in The Promise did not cross the threshold into racism, and in particular that it did not promote, endorse, or reinforce inaccurate, demeaning or discriminatory stereotypes". Complainants were advised that they could take their concerns to the Australian Communications and Media Authority. In response, the ECAJ said that it stood by its position, but would not be appealing.

A further complaint was made to SBS on 1 February 2012 by Stepan Kerkyasharian, Chair of the New South Wales government's Community Relations Commission, noting "concern that the series negatively portrays the WHOLE of the Jewish People. Such a portrayal cannot be justified in ANY context." He urged SBS "to reconsider the representations from the Jewish Community with due regard to the potential destructive consequences of racial stereotyping". In contrast, Hal Wootten, Emeritus Professor of Law at the University of New South Wales and former president of the Indigenous Law Centre, considered the ECAJ position to be misguided: "There is a striking irony in a Jewish organisation's striving to show that every Jewish character is a demon and every Arab character a saint. One by one, the ECAJ's submission proceeds to do a hatchet job on every Jewish character of any importance, rejecting the humanity with which Kosminsky endows each of them, and substituting an anti-Semitic stereotype of its own manufacture... The ECAJ reaches the opposite conclusion only by itself imputing unfavourable attributes to the Jewish characters, judging them by harsh and unrealistic standards, interpreting their conduct in the worst possible way, and making quite absurd comparisons."

Responding, ECAJ Executive Director Peter Wertheim said: "Professor Wootten denies that The Promise makes and invites judgements, but this contention is belied by the strident comments made by other defenders of the series in posted comments on the SBS and other websites, and is as low on the scale of credibility as the stream of non-sequiturs that have been put forward in its defence, including posts asserting that The Promise could not possibly be antisemitic because Kosminsky is Jewish, or because it was filmed in Israel and included Jewish actors, or because it was nominated for a BAFTA award."

On 14 February 2012, Michael Ebeid appeared before an Estimates Committee of the Australian Senate and was questioned about the commercial arrangements and decision-making of the SBS. He accepted that the series conveyed a negative view of Israel and said he would not claim that it tried to be balanced. But he rejected claims of negative stereotyping. It had not been his decision to buy the series, but asked whether in hindsight he would have made the decision, he answered that he probably would. Senators Scott Ryan and Helen Kroger both later issued press releases critical of the series. Senator Kroger stated that "SBS appears to have put a business decision ahead of independent assessments which determined that it was offensive to the Jewish community." Kroger's comments were taken up by The Australian, along with an op-ed written by two members of the Australia/Israel and Jewish Affairs Council, and she expanded further in an online piece for News Ltd website The Punch. Senator Ryan rejected Mr Ebeid's claim that because The Promise was fiction, it was subject to different considerations: "Some of the biggest slanders in history have been works of fiction", he said. "Depictions...include Jewish children stoning Arab children, blood-thirsty soldiers, conniving double-agents and members of an extremely wealthy, cosmopolitan family. Like it or not, these three depictions are antisemitic stereotypes..." On the other hand, the committee's chair Senator Doug Cameron said he had "enjoyed" the programme, and quipped in closing that he hoped the session had helped The Promise's DVD sales.

=== Other countries ===
As of January 2012 the serial had also been sold to SVT Sweden, YLE Finland, DR Denmark, RUV Iceland, RTV Slovenia, Globosat Brazil, and TVO Canada. DR Denmark broadcast the series in an early evening slot on the DR2 channel over the Easter weekend 2012, under the translated title Løftet som bandt ("The Promise that bound"). In Germany it was shown on ARTE Channel on 20 April (Part 1 and 2) and 27 April (Part 3 and 4). In Sweden it was shown on channel SVT1 on Wednesday nights at 10pm from 2 May. In Canada, TV Ontario had scheduled the programme for Sunday evenings, from 15 April to 6 May; but the channel has since decided to present a geology series with Iain Stewart in this slot, with The Promise held over to a later date.

The series was screened in April 2012 by the Tel Aviv Cinematheque and the Jerusalem Cinematheque in Israel, and in May 2012 by the Haifa Cinematheque, with five showings in the month for each episode in Tel Aviv, two in Jerusalem, and one in Haifa. In Tel Aviv the first screening of Part One was on 9 April, culminating with a final screening of all four parts on 26 April. In Jerusalem the series was scheduled with the four parts shown over two days, on 14/15 and 29/30 April. In Haifa the episodes were screened on successive Thursdays, from 10 to 21 May.

In the United States a screening of the series was presented at the Jewish Community Center in Manhattan, New York in November and December 2011, with the first part shown as part of the "Other Israel" film festival, and the remainder of the series shown in weekly episodes over the following three weeks.

In May 2012 it was announced that the series would be a featured offering on the internet television service Hulu from 11 August, and it has been available on demand from Hulu.

== See also ==
- British-Zionist conflict
- 6th Airborne Division in Palestine
