= Harold Shipman: Doctor Death =

- Genre: Crime drama
- Based on: The Harold Shipman Murders
- Written by: Michael Eaton
- Directed by: Roger Bamford
- Starring: James Bolam; James Hazeldine; Olive Pendleton; Deborah Norton; Jacqueline Pilton; Peter Gunn; Peter Penry-Jones
- Theme music composer: Debbie Wiseman
- Country of origin: United Kingdom
- Original language: English
- No. of episodes: 1

Production
- Producer: Nick Finnis
- Running time: 120 minutes
- Production company: Yorkshire Television

Original release
- Network: ITV
- Release: 9 July 2002

Harold Shipman: Doctor Death is a 2002 ITV television drama about the life and crimes of serial killer Harold Shipman. Starring James Bolam in the role of Shipman, the programme was directed by Roger Bamford and written by Michael Eaton. It was broadcast on 9 July 2002, and attracted a viewing audience of 7.37 million. The programme was released on DVD on 15 July 2013 by Strawberry Media, in association with ITV.

== Cast ==
- James Bolam as Harold Shipman
- James Hazeldine as Detective Inspector Stan Egerton
- Jacqueline Pilton as Primrose Shipman
- Olive Pendleton as Kathleen Grundy
- Deborah Norton as Debra King
- Peter Gunn as Detective Sergeant John Ashley
- Peter Penry-Jones as Dr. John Rutherford
- Gareth Thomas as Reverend Dennis Thomas
- Tony Melody as Len Fellows
- Alan Rothwell as Alan Massey
- John Flanagan as Jim King
- Clare Kerrigan as Julie Watkins
- Colin Meredith as Brian Burgess
- Demelza Randall as Debbie Bambroffe
- Michael Stainton as John Shaw
- Veda Warwick as May Clarke
- Mary MacLeod as Ivy Lomas
- Ken Kitson as Inspector Dave Smith
- Jonathan Coy as Detective Chief Superintendent Bernard Postles
- Marcus Romer as Detective Constable Ellis Crowther
- Paul Slack as Detective Sergeant John Walker
- Siobhan Finneran as Kathleen Adanski
- Monica Dolan as Police Officer (uncredited)
