= Sam Otto =

English actor

- Born: 13 June 1992 (age 33); Basingstoke, Hampshire, England
- Occupation: Actor

Sam Otto (born 13 June 1992) is a British actor who gained popularity in 2017 after playing "Jalal" in Peter Kosminsky's Channel four Series The State. He is also known for starring in Collateral, The Flood, The Boy with the Topknot and Snowpiercer.

== Early life ==
Otto was born in Basingstoke. He first got into Television and Film acting in 2017 starring in The Jackson (British TV series) as Jalal. He trained at Drama Centre London. Otto attended St Augustine's Catholic College in Trowbridge.

== Acting career ==
Otto starred in The Boy with the Topknot as "Young Sathnam's Father", before starring in the 2018 movie The Flood as Josef. Otto's most recognizable role is "Jalal" in Peter Kosminsky's Channel four series The State about young Islamic State of Iraq and the Levant recruits, chronicling their journeys into endorsement of the caliphate on the one hand, and into disillusionment and despair on the other. Otto then went on to star in TNT's 2020 thriller series Snowpiercer, as John "Oz" Osweiller, a young brakeman and police-type figure of the train. He portrayed Eshbaal in the 2025 series House of David.
