= Michael Eaton =

English playwright and scriptwriter (born 1945)

Michael Eaton MBE
- Born: Michael Ralph Eaton; 1954 (age 71–72); Sherwood, Nottingham, England
- Education: King's College, University of Cambridge
- Occupations: Playwright, scriptwriter
- Notable work: Harold Shipman: Doctor Death; Why Lockerbie; Shoot to Kill

Michael Eaton MBE (born 1954) is an English playwright and scriptwriter. He is best known for his television docudrama scripts, including Shipman, Why Lockerbie, and Shoot to Kill, and for writing the 1989 feature film Fellow Traveller, which won best screenplay at the British Film Awards. He is also known for his stage plays and BBC radio dramas.

== Early life ==
Michael Ralph Eaton was born in Sherwood, Nottingham, and educated at the Nottingham High School, before going on to read social anthropology at King's College, Cambridge, where, in 1976, he was awarded a double first. After a period in New York, he taught film studies in the School of Art History at Leicester Polytechnic and wrote for various cinema journals. He began making low-budget films in the late 1970s, including Frozen Music (with a score by Michael Nyman). In 1985, he took up a post as a visiting fellow at Griffith University in Queensland, Australia, where he was also filmmaker in residence at the Adelaide Film Workshop.

== Career ==
Eaton returned to England in the late 1980s and wrote the screenplay for Fellow Traveller, which went on to win the British Film Awards (Evening Standard) best screenplay award in 1989. He then wrote the two-part, four-hour film about the RUC shootings in Armagh and the Stalker inquiry that examined them, Shoot to Kill, which was directed by Peter Kosminsky and won the Best Drama awards at both the Royal Television Society and the Broadcasting Press Guild. The subsequent Why Lockerbie (both were broadcast in 1990) looked at the events leading to the bombing of Pan Am Flight 103. Eaton was to revisit this subject for his 2010 play at Nottingham Playhouse, The Families of Lockerbie.

His next two TV plays were fictional. The four-part Signs and Wonders (BBC2, 1995) was about a New Age religious cult, the Church of England, academia, and pit closures. Flowers of the Forest (BBC2, 1996) was a drama about allegations of Satanic abuse. Eaton was to return to the theme of religious cults in his first play for the main stage at Nottingham Playhouse, Angels Rave On (1998). He has also written the scripts for Heartbeat (2009), New Street Law (2006), and In Suspicious Circumstances (1993). An expert on Charles Dickens (whose work he has adapted many times for BBC Radio 4) and silent movies, Eaton appears in a documentary about silent film in the UK, Silent Britain (2006).

In 2002, Eaton wrote the screenplay for ITV's Shipman, about the notorious GP serial killer who, like Eaton, came from Sherwood, Nottingham. In recent years, he has increasingly turned his attention to radio and stage work, including another play about a serial killer, the notorious Charlie Peace. Charlie Peace: His Amazing Life and Astounding Legend premiered at Nottingham Playhouse in 2013 and transferred to the Belgrade Theatre, Coventry. In November 2013, his play about the publication of Laurence Sterne's The Life and Opinions of Tristram Shandy, Gentleman, The Good Humour Club, was performed at York Medical Society and made available for listening on the Laurence Sterne Trust website.

In the 1999 New Year's Honours List, Eaton was appointed MBE for services to the film industry. From 2006 to 2012, he was visiting professor in creative writing at Nottingham Trent University.

== List of works ==
=== Screenplays ===
- Fellow Traveller (1989)

=== TV plays ===
- Why Lockerbie (1990)
- Shoot to Kill (1990)
- Signs and Wonders (1995)
- Flowers of the Forest (1996)
- Shipman (2002)

=== Stage plays ===
- Angels Rave On (1997)
- The Families of Lockerbie (2010)
- Charlie Peace: His Amazing Life and Astounding Legend (2013)
- All Schools Should Be Art Schools (2015)
- Great Expections Charles Dickens adaptation for West Yorkshire Playhouse (2016)

=== Radio plays ===
- The Caves of Harmony—a Musical Entertainment for Christmas, co-written with composer Neil Brand (BBC Radio 4, 2000)
- George Silverman's Explanation (dramatisation of Dickens' short story, BBC Radio 4, 2003)
- The Pickwick Papers (four-part, BBC Radio 4 adaptation of Dickens' first novel, 2004)
- Felix Holt (three-part, 3-hour adaptation of George Eliot's novel, BBC Radio 4, 2007)
- Waves Breaking on a Shore (co-written with composer Neil Brand, BBC Radio 4, 2010)
- The Conflict Is Over (story of the Northern Ireland peace process, BBC Radio 4, 2011)
- Dickens in London (five-part series for BBC Radio 4, broadcast between November 2011 and January 2012)
- Out of the Blue (two-part BBC Radio 4 series about a UK police commissioner, 2013)
- Headhunters (90 minute BBC Radio 3 play about Alfred Cort Haddon, the first anthropological fieldwork expeditions in the Torres Strait and shell shock in World War, 2015)
- Never Mind the Ballocks (BBC Radio 4 play about the Nottingham Virgin Records Sex Pistols trial, 2023)
- A Grain of Wheat (BBC Radio 4 adaptation of the novel by Ngugi wa Thiong'o, 2023)

=== Publications ===
- "Chinatown" (monograph in BFI Film Classics series, 1997)
- "No Smoke" (short story in "City of Crime": Five Leaves Publications, 1997, edited by David Belbin)
- "Our Friends in the North" (monograph in BFI Film Classics series, 2006)
- "Charlie Peace's Criminal Exploits" (essay in "Crime", Five Leaves Publications, 2013, edited by Ross Bradshaw)
- The Priest of Nemi (play by Ernest Renan: Translated from the French by Michael Eaton, Shoestring Press, 2013)
- Head Hunters (radio play, Shoestring Press, 2020)
- Charlie Peace: His Amazing Life and Astonishing Legend (Five Leaves Publications, 2017)
- Based on a True Story: Real Made-Up Men (essays, Shoestring Press, 2020)
- B*ll*cks – A Word on Trial (play, Shoestring Press, 2023)
