= The State (British TV series) =

British television drama serial

- Genre: Drama
- Written by: Peter Kosminsky
- Directed by: Peter Kosminsky
- Starring: Ony Uhiara; Sam Otto; Shavani Cameron; Ryan McKen; Hiam Abbass; Jessica Gunning; Nana Agyeman-Bediako; Ali Suliman; Haaz Sleiman
- Composer: Debbie Wiseman
- Country of origin: United Kingdom
- No. of series: 1
- No. of episodes: 4

Production
- Executive producers: Andrew Boswell; Liza Marshall; Kris Thykier
- Producer: Steve Clark-Hall
- Cinematography: Gavin Finney
- Editor: David Blackmore
- Running time: 48 mins
- Production company: Archery Pictures

Original release
- Network: Channel 4
- Release: 20 August – 23 August 2017

The State is a four-part British television drama serial, written and directed by Peter Kosminsky, that dramatises the experiences of four young British Muslims who fly to Syria to join Islamic State. The series was originally broadcast in the UK by Channel 4, with all four parts airing on successive nights between 20 and 23 August 2017. The series was green-lit in July 2016, following extensive research by Kosminsky.

Ony Uhiara, Sam Otto, Shavani Cameron and Ryan McKen were later cast as the four principal characters: Shakira, Jalal, Ushna and Ziyad. Most of the series's location filming was undertaken in Spain later that autumn. The series was broadcast worldwide by National Geographic, airing in Australia from 23 August, and premiering in the United States as a two-night special event on 18 and 19 September, In France, the series was broadcast by Canal+ from 4 September. The series was released on DVD in the United States on 28 November 2017.

== Reception ==
The first episode was watched live by 1.4 million viewers, which was described by Broadcast magazine as a "solid start". However, Channel 4 is unlikely to make money from the series; according to outgoing chief creative officer Jay Hunt, the channel needs to cross-subsidise such dramas with more populist programmes such as Great British Bake Off. The figure increased to 2.33 million taking into account catch-up viewing over the next seven days, and 2.49 million after a month.

The series was widely praised by viewers and critics. The Guardian wrote that "this Isis drama is ... gripping and genuinely enlightening", and The Telegraph noted that "viewers on Twitter praised its stars and creators for 'capturing how barbaric and evil ISIS are'." Before the drama aired, Richard Kemp, a former advisor to the UK government on counter-terrorism, warned that it would be a "recruiting sergeant" for ISIS, a view prominently reported by several tabloid newspapers. However, the idea that the drama made ISIS glamorous or attractive was rejected by most reviewers.

Most reviewers found the drama powerful, immersive, and compelling, with both its direction and acting widely praised. However, many questioned the portrayal of the protagonists' apparent initial ignorance and naivety, and of their subsequent antipathy to brutality and hatred, and doubted that either were representative of real jihadis. Although a few references were made to IS's online engagement and misinformation, the decision not to present detailed back-stories for the characters led some critics to suggest that the series failed to explore why people might become radicalised, and that such apparently reasonable people would never have gone to Syria to support it. On the other hand, as former Conservative minister Baroness Warsi commented, "There are many proud parents who cannot understand why their children find an affiliation with Isil... So often we have lazily defined those attracted to violent ideologies promulgated in far-off countries as mad, bad misfits and yet the reality is far more complicated."

== Cast ==
=== Main cast ===
- Ony Uhiara as Shakira Boothe; a British doctor and single mother to nine-year-old Isaac who travels to Syria in the hope of working in a state hospital.
- Sam Otto as Jalal Hossein; a teenager who follows his deceased elder brother to Syria, wanting to understand what he had experienced.
- Shavani Cameron as Ushna Kaleel; a teenager seeking to be a "lioness for lions".
- Ryan McKen as Ziyad Kader; Jalal's closest friend, who accompanies him hoping for adventure.

=== Supporting cast ===
- Hiam Abbass as Umm Salamah; educator and spiritual leader
- Jessica Gunning as Umm Walid; leader of the new arrivals house
- Nana Agyeman-Bediako as Isaac Boothe; Shakira's nine-year-old son
- Ali Suliman as Abu Omar; Jalal and Ziyad's unit commander
- Haaz Sleiman as Dr. Rabia; a colleague of Shakira's
- Amir El-Masry as Sayed; a Syrian pharmacist and suspected CIA spy
- Nitin Ganatra as Munir Hossein; Jalal's estranged father
- Yannick de Waal as Abu Abbas Al-Hollandi
- Yasen Atour as Abu Issa
- Samer Bisharat as Abu Sahl
- Karim Kassem as Abu Akram
- Sebastian Griegel as Abu Lut Al-Almani
- Jack Greenlees as Abu Ibrahim Al-Brittani
- Charles Mnene as Abu Ayoub Al-Brittani
- Fayez Bakhsh as Abu Jihad Al-Brittani
- Zafer El-Abedin as Maqqir Amir

== Episodes ==
No.	Title	Directed by	Written by	Original release date	UK viewers (millions)
1	"Episode 1"	Peter Kosminsky	Peter Kosminsky	20 August 2017	2.11
Four young British muslims make the journey to Syria to join Islamic State. Best friends Jalal (Sam Otto) and Ziyad (Ryan McKen) are placed into an extensive four-week training campaign under the guidance of commander Abu Omar (Ali Suliman). Former doctor Shakira (Ony Uhiara) tries to persuade house leader Umm Walid (Jessica Gunning) to allow to her work in the local state hospital. Meanwhile, teenager Ushna (Shavani Cameron) struggles to cope with the stress of the transition, and looks to Shakira for support.
2	"Episode 2"	Peter Kosminsky	Peter Kosminsky	21 August 2017	1.78
Shakira is forced to take action when the hospital becomes the target of a bomb attack. Jalal tries to find out more about his brother and befriends Sayed (Amir El-Masry), a pharmacist with British connections. Ushna struggles with the reality that she will soon have to marry.
3	"Episode 3"	Peter Kosminsky	Peter Kosminsky	22 August 2017	1.68
Shakira is angered to discover that Isaac wishes to undertake unit training. Ushna is devastated after receiving a visit informing her that her husband has died a martyr. Jalal tries to dissuade Ziyad from driving a truck full of explosives into an enemy base.
4	"Episode 4"	Peter Kosminsky	Peter Kosminsky	23 August 2017	1.57
Shakira decides to leave Syria and return home to the UK after receiving news of her husband's death, but struggles to convince Isaac of her plans. Stricken with grief following Ziyad's death, Jalal tries to help Ibtisam and her daughter cross the border to safety. Ushna discovers that she is pregnant.
