= The Crouches =

- Written by: Ian Pattison
- Directed by: Nick Wood
- Starring: Robbie Gee; Jo Martin; Mona Hammond; Rudolph Walker; Jimmy Akingbola; Ony Uhiara; Akemnji Ndifornyen (1); Aaron Shosanya (2)
- Country of origin: United Kingdom
- No. of series: 2
- No. of episodes: 12

Production
- Producer: Stephen McCrum
- Running time: 30 minutes

Original release
- Network: BBC One
- Release: 9 September 2003 – 14 February 2005

The Crouches is a sitcom that aired on BBC One between 2003 and 2005. It starred Rudolph Walker, Robbie Gee, Jo Martin and Mona Hammond.

== Plot ==
Childhood sweethearts Roly Crouch (Robbie Gee) and Natalie (Jo Martin) have been married for 18 years. Roly works for the London Underground at Lambeth North as a Station Assistant. Roly has two best mates, Ed and Bailey. Bailey (Don Warrington) is his boss and Ed (Danny John-Jules) is also a station assistant. Ed is married to Lindy (Llewella Gideon). Their relationship is rocky.

Natalie used to be in a rap duo called Bun and Cheese with her best friend Lindy. They wanted to be Britain's answer to Salt-n-Pepa, but their musical career did not take off and Roly was the only person who did not boo at their performances. Natalie now manages Poundkickers, a discount store in Elephant and Castle Shopping Centre, and longs for some sophistication in her life.

Roly and Natalie have two demanding teenage children: Aiden (played by Akemnji Ndifernyana in series one and by Aaron Shosanya in series two) and Adele (Ony Uhiara). Aiden has Beyoncé posters on his wall and loves computer games. He hates tidying up and loves fighting with his sister. Adele loves clubbing and giving her parents grief. She does not "do" work and cannot see why her parents disapprove of her "businessman" boyfriend, Dennis Dutton (Jimmy Akingbola).

Roly and Natalie also have two of their parents living in the household: Langley (Rudolph Walker) and Sylvie (Mona Hammond). Langley, also known as Grandpa, is Roly's mischievous Trinidadian father. He was married to Roly's mother Primrose for many years, until she died eight years earlier. He still has a keen eye for the ladies. His favourite pastimes are dominoes and winding up Roly. He once invented a dance called Lick My Rifle. Sylvie, also known as Grandma, is Natalie's Jamaican mother, who was married for many years to Natalie's father Roy. She is now a widow. She dislikes Roly's miserly ways, cream teas and her cousin Janet's "tee hee" laugh. She knows that Grandpa Langley is after her, but she is more than a match for him.

== Reception ==
The show was not well received by critics and only two series were made. Its ratings were moderate: it attracted an average of three million viewers.
