= One Day in the Life of Television =

- Genre: Documentary

Production
- Executive producer: Grant McKee
- Producer: Peter Kosminsky
- Editor: Terry Warwick
- Running time: 180 mins
- Production company: Yorkshire Television

Original release
- Network: ITV
- Release: 1 November 1989

One Day in the Life of Television is a documentary that was broadcast on ITV on 1 November 1989. Filmed by more than fifty crews exactly one year earlier, it was a huge behind-the-scenes look at a wide range of activities involved in the production, reception and marketing of British television. The project was funded by the Markle Foundation, and organised by Richard Paterson and Janet Willis at the British Film Institute; it was produced and directed for television by Peter Kosminsky.

The documentary opens with TV-am's industrial conflict, with picketers outside the studio at Camden Lock. The documentary also looks at Breakfast Time, Lucky Ladders and EastEnders. Reactions to the representation of a prison storyline in the last mentioned were garnered from inmates in HMP Dartmoor.

The documentary also showed the marketing of cable television, and the availability of pornography through satellite television during the early evening.

A book by Sean Day-Lewis was published to accompany the documentary. It contains the thoughts selected from more than 20,000 participants throughout Britain, including more than 3,000 industry professionals, who recorded their feelings and experiences of television viewing on 1 November 1988, the day that the documentary was filmed.
