= Tony Clarkin (actor) =

Irish actor (born 1952)

- Clarkin in 2007
- Born: 3 November 1952 (age 73); Limerick, Ireland
- Occupation: Actor
- Years active: 1980–present

Tony Clarkin (born 3 November 1952) is an Irish actor.

== Early life ==
Clarkin was born in Limerick on 3 November 1952, and performed as a child actor in various theatre productions. He attended the boarding school Rockwell College and later acted with the Limerick City College Players. He was a member of the Abbey Theatre school of acting.

== Career ==
Clarkin is the voice over for Puffs Tissues commercials for American and Canadian television (2000-2010). He has also voiced John West Foods, Guinness, Dollond & Aitchison, Britvic, William and Mary television series, Murphys Beer, Ennio Morricone, The Sunday Times series, Lifescan Europe, Red Bull, Jays New Bloo Fusions.

Clarkin narrated The Gilbert Collection at Somerset House. He played Romeo and Prince Escalus in separate productions of Romeo & Juliet, the first of which was at the Gate Theatre in Dublin and was directed and produced by Hilton Edwards and Micheál MacLiammóir. His other stage work includes Hamlet and Polonius in Hamlet, Macbeth and Marcellus in Macbeth, Salerio in The Merchant of Venice, Thomas Becket in Murder in the Cathedral, Eilif in Mother Courage and Her Children, Roat in Wait Until Dark, Estragon in Waiting for Godot, in Romeo & Juliet, King Henry II in Becket, Ebenezer Scrooge in the musical Scrooge, Henry VIII in A Man for All Seasons, Bill Sikes in Oliver!, First Voice Narrator in Under Milkwood, Athos in The Three Musketeers, Long John Silver in The Secret of Treasure Island, Robert Folliett in The Shaughraun, and the Spirit of Christmas to Come in A Christmas Carol. He played William Burke in a Dylan Thomas adaptation of the story of Burke and Hare, The Doctor and The Devils, directed by Roger Redfarn at the Theatre Royal, Plymouth. Clarkin also played Professor Hurst of the University of Padua opposite Keith Michell in the title role, in The Artisans Angel, the story of Bernardino Ramazzini, directed by Keith Michell.

Clarkin's television work includes The Bill in 1989, Love Hurts as Toyne in 1993, Moonfleet as Revenue Man in 1984, Wild Rover (Tim Cullen) 1992, Brookside (Police Sergeant) (1995), McCallum Paul O Connor Sweet Innocent 1995, The Professionals (Empire Society Thug) (1977), Return of the Saint (Guest author at book launch) (1978), The Fear (1988), Fast Food 1993, This Is your Life Todd Carty 2000 (BBC).

Clarkin acted as teacher I, alongside Todd Carty in the BBC series Grange Hill. Radio work includes Pendennis by William Makepeace Thackeray for the BBC directed by writer and radio drama director Peter Kavanagh. Clarkin was the voice over narrator for the Gilbert Collection at Somerset House. Clarkin voiced the story of Golf, Past Masters Golf Champions. He also voiced cartoons including The Cyclops and "Global Bears" for Poseidon Films and the BBC TV documentary series Blood of the Vikings. Narration work also includes the story of the London Symphony Orchestra and their move from the Barbican to the renovated church St Luke for BBC Four television.

Clarkin's film work includes Holocaust 2000 (1977), Force 10 from Navarone (1978), The Great Train Robbery (1979), Murder by Decree (1979), Hanover Street (1979), S.O.S Titanic (1979), Star Wars: Episode V – The Empire Strikes Back (1980), Rough Cut (1980) and The Elephant Man (1980). He played a British Sergeant in the film Michael Collins for film director Neil Jordan. He played the Judge in First for Disruptive Element Films, winner of the Audi Channel Reel Talent Award 2007. Clarkin was the voice of the Victorian explorer Richard Francis Burton for the Channel 4 documentary Source of the White Nile]from the television series To the Ends of the Earth for BBC TV. Visas for Love various historical World War II figures voiced by Clarkin for Poseidon Films. Clarkin played the part of the Governor in the film The Perfect Burger, directed by Todd Carty. Clarkin is the voice over for audio description for the Blind at Sky TV for a wide variety of television programmes and films.

== Performances ==
=== Television ===
- Grange Hill BBC, (Teacher Anthony Clarkin) (1980)(1981)
- The Bill ITV (Ist Neighbour) ("Communications") (1989) (Sweet Innocent) (Paul O Connor) (1995) (Creasy) ("Fast Food") (1993) (Tim Cullen) ("Wild Rover") (1992)
- Iris in the Traffic, Ruby in the Rain BBC BBC Play For Today (Beefy Youth) (1981)
- London's Burning (Patrick Leader of Gang) (1996), (Patrick X -Raf Man) (1994)
- Brookside, Fame at Last] Channel 4 (Police Sergeant) (1995)
- Love Hurts (Strictly Business) BBC (Toyne) (1993),
- McCallum (Lab Technician) Touch (1997)
- Moonfleet (TV film) BBC (Revenue Man) (1984)
- The Fear (TV series) Euston Films (Motorist) (1988)
- Shoot to Kill (1990 film) and Shoot to Kill (1990 TV drama), Zenith Productions (Sgt William Montgomery) (1990)
- Quatermass Ringstone Round (Machine Gun Rebel) (1979)
- The Professionals (Empire Society Thug) (1977)
- Return of the Saint (Guest Author at Book Launch) (1978)
- Attila (Voice of Warrior) (2001)
- This Is Your Life Todd Carty 2000 (Himself) (2000)

=== Theatre ===
- The Artisans Angel Bernardino Ramazzini (Professor Hurst)
- The Doctor and the Devils (William Burke)
- Wait Until Dark (Roat)
- Waiting for Godot (Estragon)
- Oliver! (Bill Sikes)
- Stephen Dedalus Stephen D (Mc Cann)
- The Shaughraun (Robert Folliett)
- The Merchant of Venice (Salerio)
- Scrooge (Ebenezer Scrooge)
- Hamlet (Hamlet)
- A Christmas Carol (Spirit of Christmas to Come)
- A Man for All Seasons (King Henry VIII)
- Becket (Henry II)
- Mother Courage and Her Children (Eilif)
- Murder in the Cathedral (Thomas Becket)
- Romeo and Juliet (Prince Escalus)
- Macbeth (Macbeth)
- The Three Musketeers (Athos)
- The Secrets of Treasure Island (Long John Silver)
- Bloomsday (Buck Mulligan)
- The Fighting Prince (Swashbuckler)

=== Films ===
- Michael Collins (Sergeant Soldier on station) (1996)
- First (The Judge) (2007)
- The Perfect Burger (The Governor) (2009)
- Reminiscence (Old Man) (2016 short film)
- Attila (Voice of Warrior) (2001)
- Holocaust 2000 (Leader of Protesters Megaphone Man) (1977)
- Force 10 from Navarone (Partisan Mountain Soldier) (1978)
- Ike: The War Years (US Sergeant) (1979)
- The Great Train Robbery (Business Owner) (1979)
- Murder by Decree (Police Sergeant) (1979)
- Hanover Street (British Sergeant) (1979)
- Players 1979 film (Press Photographer) (1979)
- S.O.S. Titanic (Able Seaman) (1979)
- Carry On Emmannuelle (Newspaper Reporter) (1978)
- The Empire Strikes Back (Storm Trooper) (1980)
- Rough Cut (Party Guest) (1980)
- The Elephant Man (Thug from Pub) (1980)
- Hawk the Slayer (Drogos Man) (1980)
- Superman II (US Marine) (1980)
- The Long Good Friday (Driver Hitman) (1980)
- Eye of the Needle (film) (Sergeant Major) (1981)
- The Monster Club (Vampire) (1981)
- Outland (Technician Victim) (1981)
- Clash of the Titans (Arab Prince) (1981)
- Return of the Jedi (Storm Trooper) (1983)
- Shoot to Kill (Sergeant William Montgomery) (1990)
