= Ony Uhiara =

British actress

Ony Uhiara (born 1978/79), is an actress, best known for playing Adele in the BBC sitcom, The Crouches, which was broadcast from 2003 until 2004.

She was born in the UK of Nigerian descent and grew up in east London. Ony is the sister of Ofo Uhiara, best known for his role as PC Lance Powell in The Bill. In 2002, Ony graduated from the Guildhall School of Music and Drama.

== Filmography ==
- The Bill in episode 313 as Letitia Watson.
- The Crouches (2003–2005) - Adele Crouch
- Doctors (series 8, ep 16) - Kelly Stone
- Holby City (2004) - Amina Dukuze
- Hunter (series 1, ep 1) - Chloe
- Murder Investigation Team (2005)
- Proof (2005/6) - Tessa Kuria
- Rosemary & Thyme : Three Legs Good (2006) - Grace Oluwu
- Waking the Dead (2003) - Janice
- The State (British TV series)

== Theatre ==
- The title role in Anna Karenina adapted by Jo Clifford. At the Royal Exchange, Manchester (Co-production with West Yorkshire Playhouse) directed by Ellen McDougall (2015)
- Naome in The Rolling Stone by Chris Urch. At the Royal Exchange, Manchester (Co-production with West Yorkshire Playhouse) directed by Ellen McDougall (2015)
- Cannibals by Rory Mullarkey (2013) - The Royal Exchange, Manchester - Lizaveta
- Much Ado About Nothing by William Shakespeare (2011) - Shakespeare's Globe - Hero
- Noughts & Crosses by Malorie Blackman (2008) - Royal Shakespeare Company - Sephy
