= Afghantsi =

- Directed by: Peter Kosminsky
- Produced by: Peter Kosminsky
- Release date: 4 April 1988
- Country: United Kingdom
- Language: English

Afghantsi is a 1988 documentary film directed by Peter Kosminsky for Yorkshire Television.

It is based on numerous interviews with Soviet soldiers and officers filmed in Kabul towards the end of the Soviet–Afghan War.

Kosminsky visited several units of the 103rd Guards Airborne Division, including an outpost on a mountain side overlooking Tajbeg Palace, the headquarters of the 40th Army.

The soldiers in the film speak about the hardships of service in Afghanistan, combat experience and the loss of close friends.

Another part of the film is devoted to interviews with veterans of the war that have already returned home, and parents of those who died.
