= Britz (film) =

2007 British TV film

- Written by: Peter Kosminsky
- Directed by: Peter Kosminsky
- Starring: Riz Ahmed; Manjinder Virk
- Country of origin: United Kingdom
- Original language: English

Production
- Running time: 235 minutes

Original release
- Network: Channel 4
- Release: 4 October 2007

Britz is a two-part television drama film written and directed by Peter Kosminsky and first screened by Channel 4 in the United Kingdom in October and November 2007.

Britz attempts to understand what would lead a second generation Muslim to turn against the country of their birth. The film makes references to the July 2005 London bombings, and the 2006 Forest Gate raid.

The DVD was released in the UK on 5 November 2007.

== Plot ==
The story concerns two siblings, Sohail and Nasima Wahid, who have been brought up in Bradford, West Yorkshire, a city with a large British Pakistani population. Both are now students, Sohail studying law in London and Nasima studying medicine in Leeds. With new government anti-terrorism legislation being used against Muslims in the UK in the wake of the September 11 attacks in New York, Sohail and Nasima are drawn in radically different directions. Without telling any of his family or friends, Sohail becomes a member of MI5, while continuing his studies, in the belief that he hopes to help to stop terrorists before the situation deteriorates further. In doing so, he learns that some of his neighbours and childhood friends are politically militant. Nasima is trying to integrate into British society, attending medical school and even dates a Black British man. When her family finds out they send her back to Pakistan for a forced arranged marriage. Her boyfriend follows her, where he is beaten severely and imprisoned by her extended Pakistani family and is only saved by Sohail's intervention. She had already planned to meet the head of a terrorist training camp, and these events lead her to make her decision. She leaves behind her personal belongings and the terrorist group fake her death using a local female. This means she no longer exists and gives her the perfect opportunity not to change her mind and carry out her intentions of a mass suicide bombing.

Part one of the story is told from Sohail's point of view, while part two is from Nasima's point of view. The serial was filmed in London, Bradford, Leeds and Hyderabad, India, not Rawalpindi though part of the story is set there, especially in Part II.

== Awards ==
  - BAFTA – Best Drama Serial – 2007
  - Royal Television Society – Best Drama Serial – 2007
  - UK Broadcasting Press Guild – Nomination, Best Single Drama − 2007
  - Banff World Television Festival – Nomination, Best Mini-Series – 2007
  - International Emmy – Nomination, Best TV Movie/Mini-Series – 2007
  - Broadcast Magazine Awards – Nomination, Best Drama Series or Serial – 2007

== Cast ==
- Manjinder Virk as Nasima Wahid
- Riz Ahmed as Sohail Wahid
- Mary Stockley as Tess
- Chinna Wodu as Jude
- Zahra Ahmadi as Sabia Iqbal
- Adrian Lukis as Horne
- Shaheen Khan as Shahnaz Wahid
- Paul Bhattacharjee as Riaz Wahid
- Sagar Radia as Rafiq Wahid
- Preeya Kalidas as Shaz
- Adil Mohammed Javed as Sajid
- Zaid Munir as Faisal
- Shereen Martineau as Laure
- Arsher Ali as Matloob
- Jeff Peterson as Chris
- Amy Noble as Lizzie
- Raquel Cassidy as Joy
- Mark Bonnar as Richard
- Paul Bown as Phipps
- Elizabeth Hurran as Clare
- Harvey Virdi as Kaneez
- Haider Mohammed Javed as Rashid
- Ash Tandon as Imran
- Wasim Zakir as Speaker
- Roger May as Professor Towne
- Nick Sampson as Chapel
- Simon Wilson as Senior Diplomat
- Rudi Dharmalingam as Returned Fighter
- Ravin J. Ganatra as Inspector Hafeez
- Riz Meedin as Instructor
- Marc Anwar as Mazur
- Farzana Dua Elahe as Aisha
- Miriam Ali as Nahid
- Munir Khairdin as Imam
- Ruth Mitchell as Rachel
- Hannah Storey as Senior Nurse
- David Prosho as Senior Officer
- Paul Hurstfield as Sergeant
- Martin Walsh as Desk Sergeant
- Quill Roberts as Newsagent
- Peter Banich as Police Motorcyclist
- Mohan Randhawa as Abid Nazar
- Jack Pierce as Detective 1
- Stephen Fletcher as Detective 2
- Rohan Shroff as Shabir (as Rohan Schroff)
- Neil Bhoopalam as Majid
- Tara Sharma as Parvin
- Veena Kapoor as Yasmin
