= The Project (miniseries) =

2002 two-part television drama from BBC

- Genre: Political
- Written by: Leigh Jackson
- Directed by: Peter Kosminsky
- Starring: Matthew Macfadyen; Naomie Harris; Paloma Baeza; James Frain; Kaye Wragg; Anton Lesser; Shaun Evans
- Composer: Debbie Wiseman
- Country of origin: United Kingdom
- Original language: English
- No. of series: 1
- No. of episodes: 2

Production
- Executive producers: Pierre Chavalier; Jessica Pope
- Producer: Matthew Bird
- Cinematography: Gavin Finney
- Editor: David Blackmore
- Production companies: BBC Studios; ARTE

Original release
- Network: BBC1
- Release: 10 November – 11 November 2002

The Project is a political BBC two-part 2002 television drama film, directed by Peter Kosminsky, and written by Leigh Jackson.

Though said to be closely based upon research, the film presents a fictionalised account of developments in the Labour Party through Blairism, detailing events from the party's failure to win the 1992 General Election through to its election victory in 1997 and re-election victory in 2001, seen through the experiences of three young activists.

The first part, "Opposition", was first shown on 10 November 2002, with the second part "Government" shown the next night (divided into two parts to account for the ten-o-clock news). The cast included Matthew Macfadyen, Naomie Harris and Paloma Baeza.

Having been a co-production with the Franco-German network ARTE, the film was broadcast in France in September 2003, under the title Les années Tony Blair (The Tony Blair years) / Projekt Machtwechsel (Project 'Power Change'). A re-run on UKTV Drama followed in 2004. BBC Four re-ran the film in September 2024, as part of their Remembers strand of programming, alongside an 18-minute interview with director Kosminsky.

Kosminsky said of the project; "This film is about idealistic young people who want to help Labour get into power and ultimately, change things. It is a realistic portrayal of how we got to May 1, 1997 and what happened afterwards."

== Cast ==
(in credits order)

- Matthew Macfadyen as Paul Tibbenham
- Naomie Harris as Maggie Dunn
- Paloma Baeza as Irene Lloyd
- James Frain as Harvey
- Kaye Wragg as Lindsey
- Anton Lesser as Stanley Hall
- Shaun Evans as Andy Clark
- Andrew Shield as Security Guard
- Adam Croasdell as Josh
- Patrick Romer as George Dutton
- Paul Butterworth as Roger
- Duncan Law as John
- Christabel Muir as Toni
- Yvonne Riley as Ruth
- Amanda Richardson as Jenny
- Derek Riddell as Richard Loach
- Ben Miles as Jeremy
- Jordan Murphy as Young Ray
- Jonathan Aris as Bob
- Peter Wight as Neville (as Peter Wright)
- Emma Cleasby as Martha
- Silas Carson as Clive
- Crispin Bonham-Carter as Charles
- Alexandra Gilbreath as Deborah
- Alex Avery as Lib-Dem Candidate
- Maurice Yeoman as Jacob
- Danielle McCormack as Maria
- Robin Pearce as Claxton
- Paul Viragh as Alex
- Tristan Sturrock as Sean Sealey
- Emma Pierson as Juliette
- Rupert Ward-Lewis as Activist Agriculture Secretary
- Michael Brophy as Activist Health Secretary
- Catherine Hamilton as Activist Trade Secretary
- Holly Atkins as Carol
- Christina Cole as Lizzie
- Will Knightley as Alan Dunn
- Yvonne O'Grady as Eileen Dunn
- David Birkin as Nicholas
- Vivienne Ritchie as MP's Mistress
- Ian Driver as Tim
- John Arthur as Drake
- Alexander Perkins as Luke
- Keely Watson as Older Nell
- Hannah Yelland as Penny
- Sean Baker as Eddy
- Teresa Banham as Sian
- Joanne Baxter as Teacher
- Stephen Chapman as Whip
- Claire Adamson as Jane
- Jason Merrells as Dougie
- Pip Torrens as MoD Official
- Philip Dunbar as Donald
- Elliot Cowan as Gavin
- Colin Mace as Trevor
