= The Government Inspector (film) =

2005 television drama by Peter Kosminsky

- Genre: Factual
- Written by: Peter Kosminsky
- Directed by: Peter Kosminsky
- Starring: Mark Rylance; Jonathan Cake; Emma Fielding; Daniel Ryan; Geraldine Alexander; Georgina Rylance; James Larkin; Julian Wadham
- Composer: Debbie Wiseman
- Country of origin: United Kingdom
- Original language: English

Production
- Executive producers: David Aukin; Jonathan Curling
- Producer: Simon Chinn
- Cinematography: Gavin Finney
- Editor: David Blackmore
- Production company: Mentorn Media

Original release
- Network: Channel 4
- Release: 17 March 2005

The Government Inspector is a 2005 television drama based on the life of Dr. David Kelly, a Welsh scientist and authority on biological warfare. Written and directed by Peter Kosminsky, the film details Kelly (Mark Rylance)'s life in the lead-up to the Iraq War, and his subsequent suicide in 2003.

The film was commissioned in August 2003 during the Hutton enquiry into Kelly's death. As well as using evidence presented in the enquiry, the film was based upon interviews conducted and new evidence gathered in the wake of the enquiry's conclusion.

Kosminsky said of the film; “I wanted to understand who David Kelly was, and why he did what he did. I hope we have created a film that explores his emotional journey, with the insights and interpretations allowed by drama.”

The film won three BAFTAs – Best Actor for Rylance, Best Single Drama and Best Writer, as well as being nominated for the BAFTA for Best Original Television Music for Jocelyn Pook, and winning a RTS Television Award for Best Single Drama.

In 2011, the film was released on DVD. In 2016, the film was made available for streaming on Channel 4's All4 platform.

== Cast ==
- Mark Rylance as David Kelly
- Jonathan Cake as Alastair Campbell
- Emma Fielding as Susan Watts
- Daniel Ryan as Andrew Gilligan
- Geraldine Alexander as Janice Kelly
- Georgina Rylance as Rachel Kelly
- James Larkin as Tony Blair
- Julian Wadham as Jonathan Powell
- Pip Torrens as John Scarlett
- Kayvan Novak as Qasim Hamdani
- Philip Bowen as Sir Kevin Tebbit
- Barnaby Kay as Tom Kelly
- Tom Beard as Godric Smith
- Darren Morfitt as Daniel Pruce
- Martin Maynard as Paul Hammill
- Geoffrey Freshwater as Andrew MacKinlay
