= Peter Kosminsky =

British writer, director and producer (born 1956)

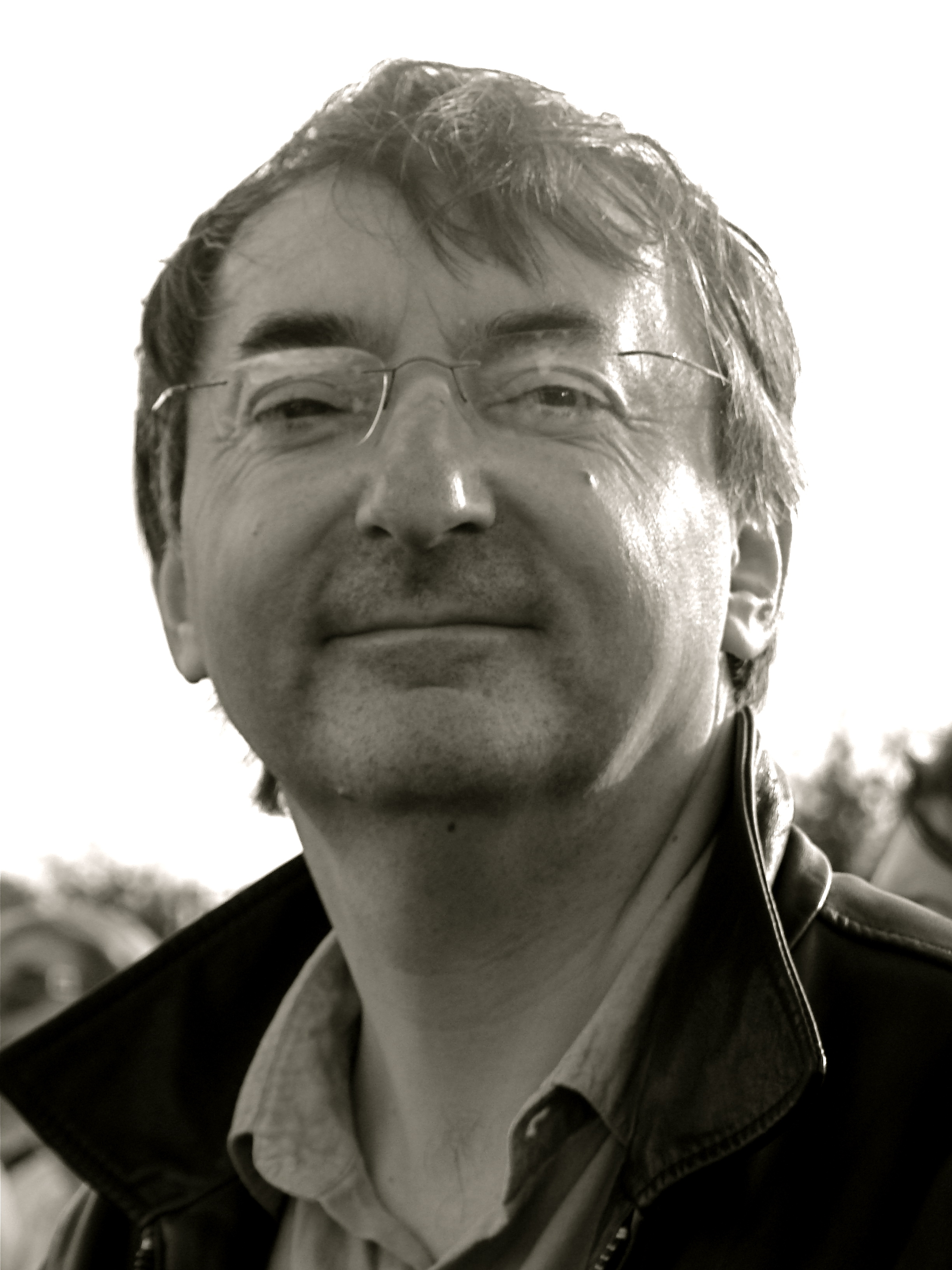
- Born: 21 April 1956 (age 70); London, England
- Education: Haberdashers' Aske's Boys' School
- Alma mater: Worcester College, Oxford
- Occupations: Film director, writer, producer

Peter Kosminsky (born 21 April 1956) is a British writer, director and producer. He has directed Hollywood movies such as White Oleander and television films like Warriors, The Government Inspector, The Promise, Wolf Hall and The State.

== Biography ==
Kosminsky was born in London in 1956 to Jewish parents. He was educated at the Haberdashers' Aske's Boys' School and the University of Oxford, where he studied chemistry under John Danby of Worcester College, Oxford and was elected JCR President. He spent much of his time at the university involved in student theatre, where he was treasurer of the Oxford University Dramatic Society. He produced Twelfth Night for the OUDS which toured to northern France and starred a young Hugh Grant.

On graduation in 1980, he joined the staff of the BBC in London as a general trainee, alongside Kevin Lygo (now head of studios at ITV), Dominic Cameron (former managing director of ITV.com) and Peter Salmon (former Controller of BBC1).

On finishing his training in 1982, Kosminsky became a script editor in the BBC Plays Department but was fired within three months of starting work. With the help of BBC2 Controller Brian Wenham with whom he had worked as a trainee, he moved sideways on short-term contract to the BBC Current Affairs Department in Lime Grove to work on programmes such as Nationwide and Newsnight, before beginning his documentary directing career in earnest in 1985 under John Fairley and John Willis at Yorkshire Television. Programmes at YTV included The Falklands War: The Untold Story, a two-hour documentary made with Michael Bilton to mark the 5th anniversary of the Argentine invasion of the islands. In 1990, Kosminsky began work as a drama director, directing the four-hour ITV drama Shoot To Kill, written by Mick Eaton and starring Jack Shepherd, for Yorkshire Television. It was transmitted in the UK as two two-hour films on 3 and 4 June 1990 (RTS Best Single Drama – 1990). The programme was banned in Northern Ireland.

In 1995, Kosminsky was fired from YTV by incoming managing director Bruce Gyngell and set up his own company, Stonehenge Films Ltd, to act as a vehicle for his television dramas. His first independent drama as producer and director was No Child of Mine, written by Guy Hibbert and starring Brooke Kinsella for Meridian Broadcasting/ITV. The programme, transmitted in the UK on 25 February 1997, was a factually-based depiction of sexual abuse at home and in care and provoked considerable controversy. Its string of awards included the BAFTA Award for Best Single Drama – 1997 and the FIPA D'Or in Biarritz.

In 1999, Kosminsky teamed up with writer Leigh Jackson and producer Nigel Stafford-Clark to make Warriors (1999), a two-part drama for BBC Television which told the harrowing story of the first British peacekeeping deployment to central Bosnia in 1992-3. Starring the at the time unknown actors Ioan Gruffudd, Matthew Macfadyen and Damian Lewis, the films were shown on BBC1 to considerable acclaim. BAFTA Best Drama Serial – 1999, Royal Television Society Best Single Drama – 1999 and the Prix Italia for Best Fiction Serial – 1999. It transmitted in the UK across two nights on BBC1 in November 1999.

Kosminsky's collaboration with Leigh Jackson continued with The Project (2002), a two-part drama for BBC1, about New Labour. The first film – "Opposition" – deals with the Labour Party's attempt to reform itself into New Labour, as seen through the eyes of a group of student supporters. The second film – "Government" – shows what happens to the same characters when Labour comes to power in 1997. Revealing for the first time some of the tactics used by Labour to bring to an end 18 years of Tory rule, the films were immensely controversial. Leigh Jackson fell ill with cancer during the making of the programmes, but survived to see them transmitted in November 2002.

In July 2003, Kosminsky began his collaboration with Channel 4 and David Aukin's Daybreak Pictures. Aukin encouraged Kosminsky to write the films he directed and three programmes resulted. The Government Inspector (2005), starred Mark Rylance and told the story of the death of biological weapons inspector Dr David Kelly and the search for weapons of mass destruction in Iraq. It was transmitted in the UK on Channel 4 on 17 March 2005 and won a series of awards including BAFTAs for Best Single Drama, Best Actor (Mark Rylance) and Best Writer (Kosminsky). Next came Britz (2007), starring Riz Ahmed and Manjinder Virk. In the wake of the 7/7 bombings in London, the two 100-minute films examined what it meant to be second-generation Muslim living in Britain today. Transmitted on Channel 4 as part of their 25th anniversary celebrations on 30 and 31 October 2007, the films won Best Drama Serial of 2007 at BAFTA and at the Royal Television Society.

The final collaboration between Kosminsky and David Aukin for Channel 4 is The Promise (2011), a 4 x 100-minute serial written and directed by Kosminsky which was transmitted across four Sundays in February 2011. It stars Claire Foy and Christian Cooke and is shot entirely on location in the Middle East. Eight years in the making, it tells the story of British soldiers stationed in Palestine during the Mandate period 1945–1948 and the impact of those events on the current situation in Israel/Palestine. The programme was nominated for a BAFTA for Best Drama Serial of 2010/11 in April 2011 and nominated for Best Drama Serial of 2011 by the Royal Television Society in February 2012. The Promise was dubbed and transmitted by Canal+ in France in four parts as Le Serment, commencing 21 March 2011.

Kosminsky has directed two feature films, Wuthering Heights (1992), (with (Ralph Fiennes and Juliette Binoche), for Paramount Pictures and White Oleander (2002), (with Michelle Pfeiffer, Renée Zellweger, Robin Wright Penn and Alison Lohman), for Warner Bros. He has been a member of the Policy Council of Liberty, the campaigner for human rights, a past Council member of BAFTA, a Fellow of the Royal Television Society, a founding board member of Directors UK, (the body representing working film and TV directors in the United Kingdom) and a winner of the BAFTA Alan Clarke Award for Outstanding Creative Contribution to TV.

Kosminsky directed Wolf Hall (TV, 2015) for the BBC. Based on the Booker Prize winning novels Wolf Hall and Bring Up the Bodies by Hilary Mantel, the six-part serial was written by Peter Straughan and stars Mark Rylance as Thomas Cromwell, Damian Lewis as King Henry VIII and Claire Foy as Queen Anne Boleyn. The serial was transmitted on BBC Two in January and February 2015. and on Masterpiece (TV series) in the United States later the same year. It received eight Emmy nominations and ten BAFTA programme and craft nominations, going on to win the Best Television Limited Series or Motion Picture Made for Television award at the Golden Globes; a Peabody Award and Baftas for Best Drama and Best Actor (Mark Rylance), together with Best Fiction Editing (David Blackmore) and Best Fiction Sound (Simon Clark and team) at the Bafta Craft Awards. In 2024 Kosminsky directed a six-part television dramatisation of 'The Mirror & the Light' for the BBC, the final part of the 'Wolf Hall' trilogy. It again stars Mark Rylance as Thomas Cromwell and Damian Lewis as Henry VIII.

In 2009 Kosminsky was awarded an honorary doctorate in Arts from Bournemouth University and profiled on The South Bank Show by Melvyn Bragg. In September 2011 he was awarded an Honorary Fellowship by University College, Falmouth. In January 2012, Kosminsky was elected by BFI members to the Board of Governors of the British Film Institute. His term lasted four years. In June 2016, he was awarded an Honorary Fellowship by his old college, Worcester College, Oxford.

In December 2011, the British Film Institute mounted a season celebrating Kosminsky's 30 years in film and television. The programme included several examples of Kosminsky's early documentary work as well as more recent dramas. 13 December saw Francine Stock interview Kosminsky about his career so far in front of a National Film Theatre audience. Writing about the season in the Daily Telegraph, Jasper Rees wrote "Peter Kosminsky has earned that rare accolade for a director of television drama: a retrospective at the BFI".

Describing him as "Britain's most controversial television director" and "a pretty much unique figure in contemporary television who has devoted his career to giving the powerful sleepless nights", Rees quotes Kosminsky as saying "I'd be nervous if I were clubbable. It would be deeply dodgy if I was in there hugging and kissing all the great and the good. It would mean that what I was doing was a game. It's not a game. I've devoted my life to it. I've spent month after month after month sitting in a small room trying to achieve this. I don't expect to be loved or admired or patted on the back or become a cuddly figure of dissent who's been in some way neutered by being absorbed into the body politic. I want to be on the outside shouting, sometimes rather shrilly, about things that upset me and annoy. That was my upbringing, that was my training, and that's what I'll do till I drop."

On 8 May 2016, after Wolf Hall won Best Drama Series at the 2016 British Academy Television Awards, Kosminsky, who directed the show, made a speech about defending the BBC and Channel 4 from government interference. This earned him a roaring standing ovation.

== Director – filmography ==
- The Falklands War: the Untold Story (TV, 1987)
- Afghantsi (TV, 1988)
- One Day in the Life of Television (TV, 1989)
- Shoot to Kill (TV, 1990)
- Emily Brontë's Wuthering Heights (1992)
- 15: The Life and Death of Philip Knight (TV, 1993)
- The Dying of the Light (TV, 1994)
- No Child of Mine (TV, 1997)
- Walking on the Moon (TV, 1999)
- Warriors (TV, 1999)
- Innocents (TV, 2000)
- The Project (TV, 2002)
- White Oleander (2002)
- The Government Inspector (TV, 2005)
- Britz (TV, 2007)
- The Promise (TV, 2011)
- Wolf Hall (TV, 2015; 2024)
- The State (TV, 2017)
- The Undeclared War (TV, 2022)
- Grenfell (TV, TBA)

== Producer – filmography ==
- The Falklands War: the untold story (1987), TV – Joint credit
- Afghantsi (1988), TV
- One Day in the Life of Television (TV, 1989)
- 15: The Life and Death of Philip Knight (1993), TV
- The Dying of the Light (1994), TV
- No Child of Mine (1997), TV
- Walking on the Moon (1999), TV
- Innocents (2000), TV
- Honour (2020), TV

== Writer – filmography ==
- The Government Inspector (2005), TV
- Britz (2007), TV
- L'École du pouvoir (TV, 2009)
- The Promise (2011), TV
- The State (2017), TV
- The Undeclared War (TV, 2022)

== Awards ==
- The Falklands War: The Untold Story (1987), TV
  - Prix Italia – Special Jury Commendation – 1987
  - International Emmy – Finalist, Documentary category – 1987
  - Banff World Television Festival – Best documentary – 1987
  - BFI – Award for Archival Achievement – 1987
  - UK Broadcasting Press Guild – Best Single Documentary – 1987
  - Rheims Festival, France – Special Jury Prize – 1987
  - World TV Festival, Tokyo – Tokyo Prize for Best Documentary – 1988
  - Montreal – Selection for inclusion in "Documentaries of The Decade" Festival – 1989
- Cambodia: Children of the Killing Fields (1989), TV
  - New York Film and TV Festival – Finalist – 1988
  - Paters, Australia – Best National or International Current Affairs Programme – 1988
  - One World Broadcasting Trust – Best Documentary – 1988
- Afghantsi (1988), TV
  - Royal Television Society – Best International Current Affairs Programme – 1988
  - Monte-Carlo Television Festival – Nymphe d'Or for Best Factual Programme and Critics' Prize – 1988
  - Prix Europa, Berlin (formerly Prix Futura) – Best Documentary – 1988
  - Royal Television Society – Best Documentary – 1988
  - Prix Italia – ITV entry for Best Documentary – 1989
  - Festival di Popoli, Florence – Best Ethnographic Documentary – 1988/89
  - New York Film and TV Festival – Finalist – 1989
- Shoot To Kill (1990), TV
  - BAFTA – Nomination, Best Single Drama – 1990
  - Royal Television Society – Best Single Drama – 1990
  - UK Broadcasting Press Guild – Best Single Drama – 1990
  - Rheims Festival, France – Prix de la Meilleure Fiction – 1990
- 15: The Life and Death of Philip Knight (1993), TV
  - Royal Television Society – ITV nomination, Best Single Drama – 1993
  - San Francisco International Film Festival – Certificate of Merit, Feature – 1994 Golden Gate Awards
  - Howard League for Penal Reform – Media Prize – 1993
  - Prix Europa, Berlin – The Special Prize – 1994
  - Golden Chest Awards, Bulgaria – Best Film – 1994
  - New York Film & Television Festival – Silver Medal – 1994
- The Dying of the Light (1994), TV
  - BAFTA – Nomination, Best Single Drama – 1994
  - Banff World Television Festival – Nomination, Best Film – 1994
- No Child of Mine (1997), TV
  - BAFTA – Best Single Drama – 1997
  - Munich Film Festival – In Competition – 1997
  - Toronto International Film Festival – Official Selection – 1997
  - AFI, Los Angeles – Grand Jury, Special Commendation – 1997
  - Golden Chest Awards, Bulgaria – Brooke Kinsella, Best Child Actress – 1997
  - Mental Health Media Awards – Overall Winner – 1997
  - RTS – Best Sound – 1997
  - FIPA, Biarritz – Winner – 1997
  - Chicago International Television Festival – Certificate of Merit – 1997
  - Tromsco Film Festival, Norway – Official selection – 1998
  - Singapore Film Festival – In Competition – 1998
  - Cinéma Tous Ecrans, Geneva – Grand Prix – 1998
  - 50th International Human Rights Festival, Belgium – Selected – 1998
- Warriors (1999), TV
  - BAFTA – Best Drama Serial – 1999
  - Royal Television Society – Best Single Film, Best Score, Best Costume, Best Sound, nominations for Best Actor, Best Writer, Best Team – 1999
  - Prix Italia – Best Fiction Serial – 1999
  - UK Broadcasting Press Guild – Best Single Film – 1999
  - South Bank Show Awards – Best Television Drama – 1999
  - FIPA, Biarritz – FIPA D'OR – 2000
  - Monte-Carlo Television Festival – Nymphe d'Or, Best Mini Series – 1999.
  - Amsterdam – Nombre d'Or, Best Drama – 1999
  - International Emmy, New York – Nomination, Best Drama – 1999
  - Birmingham Film & TV Festival – Samuelson Television Award, Best TV Drama – 1999
- White Oleander (2002)
  - Screen Actors Guild Award – Nomination, Best Supporting Actress, Michelle Pfeiffer – 2003
  - Golden Satellite Awards – Nomination, Best Supporting Actress, Renée Zellweger – 2003
  - Kansas City Film Critics Circle – Best Supporting Actress, Michelle Pfeiffer – 2003
  - San Diego Film Critics Society – Best Supporting Actress, Michelle Pfeiffer – 2003
  - Young Artist Awards – Best Supporting Young Actor, Marc Donato – 2003
- The Government Inspector (2005), TV
  - BAFTA – Best Single Drama, Best Actor (Mark Rylance), Best Writer (PK), Nomination for Best Original Score (Jocelyn Pook) – 2005
  - Royal Television Society – Best Single Drama – 2005
  - UK Broadcasting Press Guild – Nomination, Best Single Drama – 2005
- Britz (2007), TV
  - BAFTA – Best Drama Serial – 2007
  - Royal Television Society – Best Drama Serial – 2007
  - UK Broadcasting Press Guild – Nomination, Best Single Drama − 2007
  - Banff World Television Festival – Nomination, Best Mini-Series – 2007
  - International Emmy – Nomination, Best TV Movie/Mini-Series – 2007
  - Broadcast Magazine Awards – Nomination, Best Drama Series or Serial – 2007
- The Promise (2011), TV
  - One World Media – Winner, Best Drama – 2010/11
  - BAFTA – Nomination, Best Drama Serial – 2010/11
  - Royal Television Society – Nomination, Best Drama Serial – 2011
  - Banff World Television Festival – Nomination, Best Mini-Series – 2011
- Wolf Hall (TV, 2015)
  - BAFTA - Best Drama - 2015; Best Actor (Mark Rylance) - 2015; Best Fiction Editing (David Blackmore) - 2015; Best Fiction Sound (Simon Clark and team) - 2015
  - Golden Globes - Best Television Limited Series or Motion Picture Made for Television award 2015
  - Peabody Award - 2016
  - UK Broadcasting Press Guild – Best Drama Series – 2015; Best Actor (Mark Rylance) - 2015
  - Primetime Emmys - Eight nominations - 2015 including Outstanding Limited Series - 2015; Outstanding Lead Actor In A Limited Series Or A Movie (Mark Rylance) - 2015; Outstanding Supporting Actor in a Limited Series or Movie (Damian Lewis) - 2015; Outstanding Directing For A Limited Series, Movie Or A Dramatic Special (Peter Kosminsky) - 2015; Outstanding Writing for a Limited Series, Movie, or Dramatic Special (Peter Straughan) - 2015 and Outstanding Casting For A Limited Series, Movie Or A Special (Nina Gold) - 2015
- The State (TV, 2017)
  - Royal Television Society – Nomination, Best Mini-Series
  - UK Broadcasting Press Guild – Nomination, Best TV Drama Series
  - BAFTA – Nomination, Best Mini-Series

== Special awards ==
- Royal Television Society – Fellowship – 2006
- BAFTA – Alan Clarke Award for Outstanding Creative Contribution to TV – 1999
- FIPA, Biarritz – EuroFipa d'Honneur – 2005
- BFI – Special Award for Television Achievement – 1988/89
