= Debbie Wiseman =

British composer for film and television (born 1963)

Debbie Wiseman OBE
- Born: 10 May 1963 (age 63); London, England
- Genres: Film and television
- Occupations: Composer; broadcaster
- Website: debbiewiseman.co.uk

Debbie Wiseman OBE (born 10 May 1963) is a British composer for film, television and the concert hall, known also as a conductor and a radio and television presenter.

== Biography ==
Debbie Wiseman was born in Belsize Park, north west London, and attended the Henrietta Barnett School. She studied at Trinity College of Music Junior Department, and then piano and composition at the Guildhall School of Music and Drama studying piano with James Gibb, and composition with Buxton Orr.

Wiseman is a visiting professor at the Royal College of Music. In 2008, she composed Different Voices which was premiered by the Royal Philharmonic Orchestra as part of their 60th birthday celebrations, and the work is now frequently performed.

She was appointed Member of the Order of the British Empire (MBE) in the 2004 New Year Honours for services to the film industry, was promoted to Officer of the same Order (OBE) for services to music in the 2018 Birthday Honours, and has been awarded Honorary Fellowships of Trinity College of Music and the Guildhall School of Music and Drama.

Wiseman was admitted to the degree of Doctor of Music at the University of Sussex in 2015.

Wiseman was awarded the Fellowship of the Royal College of Music in 2020.

== Credits ==
=== Overview ===
Wiseman's film music credits include Tom and Viv (Nominated for two Academy Awards and the Alexander Korda Award for Outstanding British Film, 1994); Haunted; Wilde (Nominated for Best Original Film Score, Ivor Novello Awards, 1997); Tom's Midnight Garden; The Guilty; Before You Go; Arsène Lupin (Winner of Best Score for a Foreign language film and nominated for Score of the Year, Movie Music UK Awards, 2005); Flood (Nominated for Best Score for a Horror/Thriller, IFMCA Awards, 2007); and Lesbian Vampire Killers (Nominated for Best Score for a Comedy, IFMCA Awards, 2009).

Amongst her television music credits are Shakespeare & Hathaway: Private Investigators (2018); Dickensian (2015); Wolf Hall (2015); A Poet in New York (2013); The Whale (2013); Lost Christmas (Winner of Best Kids TV Movie / Mini-series, International Emmy Awards, 2013); The Passion; Jekyll; The Promise (Nominated for Best Drama Serial, BAFTA Awards, 2011); He Knew He Was Right; Warriors (Best Original Score ( RTS Awards, 2000), Winner of Best Drama (The South Bank Show Awards, 2000) & Winner of Best Drama Serial (BAFTA Awards, 2000)); Father Brown; WPC 56; The Coroner: Land Girls (Winner of Broadcast Award, 2010); Joanna Lumley's Nile; Fry's Planet Word; Stephen Fry in America; Othello (Nominated for Best Single Drama, BAFTA Awards, 2002); The Project; Judge John Deed; Feather Boy (Best Children's Drama, BAFTA Awards, 2004); The Inspector Lynley Mysteries; Michael Palin's New Europe ("Wild East" & "Baltic Summer"); The Andrew Marr Show; Stig of the Dump (Emmy Award Winner, 2002).

=== 2000s ===
Her album Wilde Stories was nominated for a Grammy Award and was used on a set of animated films made in 2003 for Channel 4. Wiseman conducted the National Symphony Orchestra playing the music live to accompany screenings in Birmingham and London of two of those films, The Selfish Giant and The Nightingale and the Rose.

In 2007 she was awarded the Gold Badge of Merit by the British Academy of Composers & Songwriters.

In 2008 she composed and conducted the CD Different Voices with the Royal Philharmonic Orchestra, with narration by Stephen Fry and solo vocals performed by Hayley Westenra, The lyrics are written by Don Black.

=== 2010s ===
In the Classic FM Top 100 2010 Movie Music Chart, Wiseman's score for Wilde was voted in at number 12 by the station's listeners.

In 2011 Wiseman presented a Radio 4 programme on the composer Joseph Horowitz, and appeared on the panel of Your Desert Island Discs at Christmas with Bill Bailey and Jo Whiley, presented by Kirsty Young. Since 2011, Wiseman has been signed as a recording artist to Warner Classics, her first solo album for the label, Piano Stories, which featured piano solo performances by the composer of many of her scores, entered the UK Classical Artist Album Chart at number 10.

She presented a Channel 4 series Backtracks, examining the role of music in film and television productions.

In 2013 she presented Scoring Father Brown for Radio 4, which followed her composition process through the various stages as she scored the music for the BBC drama series. She also scored A Poet in New York, which was broadcast in 2014 on BBC Two.

In 2015 she wrote the theme tune and incidental music for BBC1's daytime drama The Coroner. In March 2015, Wiseman's original score for the BBC drama series Wolf Hall entered the UK's Classic FM chart at number 1. In the following year, it won the Royal Television Society West Awards for Best Composer, Drama, and the Music and Sound Awards for Best Original Composition, Television Programme Score.

Wiseman is Classic FM's Composer in Residence and her first album commissioned by Classic FM, The Musical Zodiac, reached Number 2 in the UK Classical Chart in September 2016. In 2016 she composed the soundtrack to the 2017 film Edie. Wiseman has composed new signature music for Viking Cruises and was honoured as Godmother to their new river ship, Viking Herja, in March 2017.

Wiseman's second album commissioned by Classic FM, The Glorious Garden, a collaboration with Alan Titchmarsh, was released in March 2018 and topped the UK Classical Chart for three weeks.

=== 2020s ===
Wiseman's album The Mythos Suite, a collaboration with Stephen Fry, went to number 1 in the UK classical charts on its release in February 2020.

Wiseman's album to celebrate the Queen's 95th birthday The Music of Kings and Queens, with narration by Helen Mirren and Damian Lewis, went to number 1 in the UK Classical charts on its release in June 2021.

Wiseman was voted the most popular living composer in Classic FM Hall of Fame 2022 with seven entries: Wolf Hall, Shakespeare and Hathaway, Wilde, The Musical Zodiac, The Mythos Suite, The Music of Kings and Queens, and The Glorious Garden reaching its highest ever position in the chart at number 4.

Wiseman was the official composer and musical director of the Platinum Jubilee of Elizabeth II at Windsor in May 2022. Later that same year, a specially-commissioned track, Elizabeth Remembered, composed and conducted by Wiseman, was used by the BBC as the theme music for its coverage of the late Queen's funeral and associated events. She later said that it had been recorded by the BBC Concert Orchestra five years earlier: "It was done in great secrecy, but with great respect; we understood that it had to be done. It was sad to have to do it, but at the same time we knew we were doing it for the right reasons."

In 2023 she composed a new setting of the Alleluia for the coronation of Charles III and Camilla.

In November 2025, Wiseman was awarded the inaugural Ivor Novello Award for Outstanding Contribution to Screen Composition.
