= Leo Hatton =

British actress

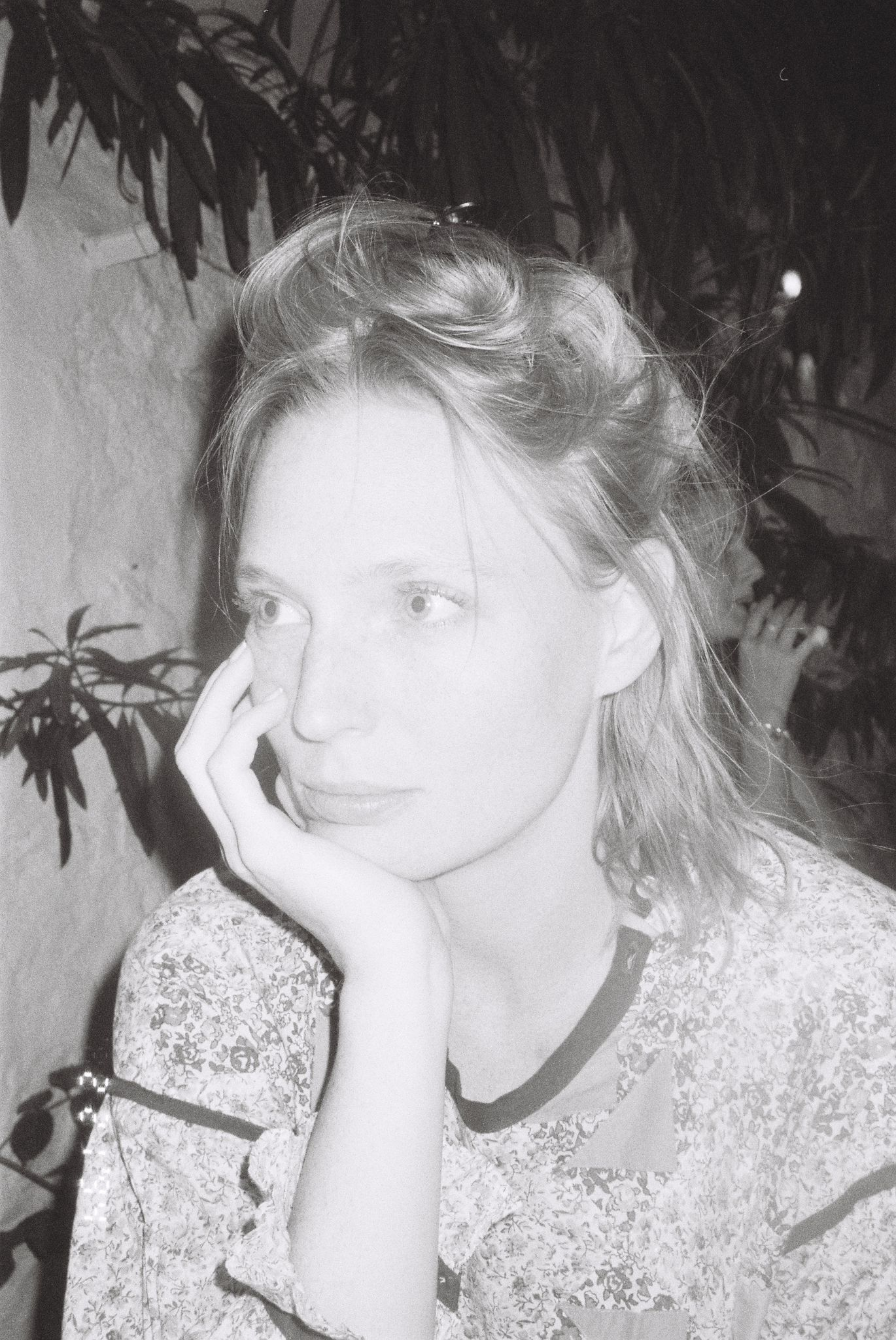
- Born: London, United Kingdom
- Occupation: Actress
- Years active: 2015–present

Leo Hatton is a British actress best known for her upcoming role as Ellie Gordon in No Man's Land, the Arté/Hulu espionage thriller-drama.

== Career ==
In 2023, she signed with Artists First Management in Los Angeles.

=== Television ===
Hatton stars in No Man's Land (2025) series two, an upcoming Arté and Hulu series set against the backdrop of the Syrian Civil War. The drama explores the conflicts between Westerners who joined ISIS and the YPJ, the Kurdish female resistance forces that fought against them. The show also stars notable French actresses Melanie Thierry and Souhela Yacoub.

A high-concept espionage war drama, No Man's Land Series Two spans eight episodes and features a multilingual cast speaking five language: French, Arabic, English, Kurdish, and Hebrew. The global British distribution and production company Fremantle announced a second season in November 2022, with Fremantle's Global Drama President, Christian Vesper, expressing excitement about working with an exceptional creative team and new talent to bring the show to audiences worldwide. Olivier Wotling, at that time the Head of Drama at Arte France, conveyed his pride in contributing to the series, emphasizing that the new season will showcase the personal and human dimensions of a global conflict. The show is also co-produced by Haut Et Court, Spiro and Masha Productions.

In April 2025, French newspaper Le Figaro gave the show 4/5 stars writing that the show is "a maelstrom of strong emotions." Furthermore, Paris daily Le Parisien described it as an "ambitious series" that "remains as breathtaking and heartbreaking as ever."

Hatton made her television debut in 2015 with Maigret Sets a Trap (ITV), appearing alongside Rowan Atkinson. In 2016, Wes Anderson cast Leo Hatton in his short film Come Together: A Fashion Picture in Motion for H&M which starred Adrian Brody and Garth Jennings.

She has also appeared in several high-profile television dramas, including Silent Witness (BBC One) in a guest-starring role as Kate Freeman in the season 10 finale, acting alongside Emilia Fox and David Caves. Leo further expanded her television credits with the BBC as Ariel Fanshaw in Death in Paradise (BBC One), the British-French crime drama, which is set on the fictional Caribbean island of Saint Marie. In 2018, Leo was cast as Lady Ann in Queens: The Virgin and the Martyr (RTVE), a supporting lead in an eight episode Spanish historical drama.

In 2024, she appeared alongside Theo James in a commercial for Range Rover, directed by Boo George and produced by NM Productions.

=== Film ===
In the critically acclaimed indie film Postcards from London for Peccadillo Pictures and the BFI directed by Steve McLean, Hatton played three roles The Doctor, Mary Magdalene and The Prostitute, starring alongside Harris Dickenson and Jonah Hauer-King.

Hatton was cast as the female lead in the 2022 indie biopic film The Man Who Saved the Internet with a Sunflower, co-starring alongside Martin Delaney.

== Filmography ==
=== Film ===
Film
Year	Title	Character	Notes
2022	The Man Who Saved the Internet with a Sunflower	Terry Ryan	Female Lead
2018	Postcards from London	The Doctor + Mary Magdalene + The Prostitute	BFI & Peccadillo Pictures

=== Television ===
Television
Year	Title	Character	Network	Role	Eps
2025	No Man's Land	Ellie Gordon	Arte/Hulu	Lead	8/8
2023	Silent Witness	Kate Freeman	BBC One	Special Guest Star	Double Bill
2022	Death in Paradise	Ariel Fanshaw	BBC One	Special Guest Star	1
2018	Endeavour	Jean Ward	ITV		1
2016–2018	Stan Lee's Lucky Man	Mary Wells	Sky One		1
2016–2017	Queens: The Virgin and the Martyr	Lady Ann	RTVE	Supporting Lead	8/8
2016	Maigret Sets a Trap	Michelle	ITV		1

=== Short films ===
Short Films
Year	Title	Role	Director	Award
2020	In It Together	Jessica	Sophie Russel	
2017	H&M: A Fashion Short		Wes Anderson	
2017	Rate Me	Sunshower	Fyzal Boulifa	Won at Quinzaine des Réalisateurs, Cannes Film Festival
