= Colin Callender =

British businessman (born 1952)

Sir Colin Callender CBE
- Born: Colin Nigel Callender; May 1952 (age 74); London
- Education: University of East Anglia
- Occupations: Film executive and executive producer
- Spouse: Elizabeth Gaine
- Children: 3

Sir Colin Nigel Callender CBE (born May 1952) is a British television, film and theater producer. He is the former President of HBO Films and Founder/Chairman of Playground Entertainment, a production company based in New York and London.

Callender played a key role in shaping the British independent production sector during the birth of Channel Four. He was also responsible for HBO’s unprecedented commercial and critical success, setting new benchmarks for quality film and television production.

== Early life and education ==
Callender was born in London to an Orthodox Jewish family, the son of Lydia and Martin Callender. He has a brother, Neeman, and a sister, Claire.

Callender holds a BA with Honours in Philosophy and Politics from the University of East Anglia.

== Career ==
=== Early career ===
Callender started in the entertainment industry as a member of Britain's National Youth Theatre and began his production career in 1974 at the Royal Court Theatre in London as stage manager, working with directors such as Mike Leigh, David Hare and Sam Shepard. Later, he joined Granada television as a graduate trainee where he worked on Cat on a Hot Tin Roof (1976), the Granada co-production with NBC starring Natalie Wood, Robert Wagner and Laurence Olivier.

=== Primetime Television ===
In 1978, Callender co-founded Primetime television where he quickly established himself as one of the UK's leading television and film producers. At Primetime, he pioneered the pre-selling and co-producing of UK drama with foreign broadcasters. Production and co-production credits with Primetime include D. H. Lawrence's The Captain's Doll (1983), starring Jeremy Irons, for BBC and ARD Germany; Separate Tables (1983), starring Alan Bates and Julie Christie, directed by John Schlesinger; Mr. Halpern and Mr. Johnson (1983), starring Laurence Olivier and Jackie Gleeson; Swallows and Amazons (1984); and The Life and Adventures of Nicholas Nickleby (1982).

Produced by Callender, directed by Jim Goddard and filmed at the Old Vic theatre, the £2 million project starred the original theatrical cast and was broadcast by Channel Four in the UK in late 1982 and Mobile Showcase Theatre in the US in January 1983 as a four-part miniseries. It was Callender's first credit as a producer and he went on to win the Emmy Award for Outstanding Miniseries in a category that included other nominees The Winds of War (1983) and The Thorn Birds (1983).

=== The Callender Company ===
In 1983, Callender founded The Callender Company Ltd. The company co-produced Arch of Triumph (1984), starring Lesley-Anne Down and Anthony Hopkins, and Timeslip (1985), a futuristic thriller series co-produced with YTV and pre-sold to HBO. Callender also produced Peter Greenway's The Belly of an Architect (1987), which was the official British entry to the 1987 Cannes Film Festival; John Schlesinger's Madame Sousatzka (1988) starring Shirley MacLaine; The Bretts a 13-hour mini-series for Masterpiece Theatre, Prisoner of Honour (1991), starring Richard Dreyfuss. Callender was at the forefront of bringing together talent from the UK and the U.S., which has gone on to become one of the hallmarks of his career.

During this time, Callender also created and produced the British cult hit The Last Resort (1987), which changed the face of late-night television in the UK and launched the career of British TV personality Jonathan Ross.

=== HBO ===
In 1986, Callender moved to the U.S. to become Executive Producer of HBO's newly formed East Coast production unit HBO Showcase.

HBO Showcase produced 27 films, receiving widespread critical acclaim and earning HBO its first Emmy Award for drama. In 1996, Callender and HBO CEO Jeffrey Bewkes created the film division HBO NYC. As head of HBO NYC, Callender oversaw films including If These Walls Could Talk (1996), starring Demi Moore and Cher; Miss Evers' Boys (1997), starring Laurence Fishburne; In the Gloaming (1997), starring Glenn Close and Whoopi Goldberg; Subway Stories (1997); Always Outnumbered (1998), starring Laurence Fishburne; When Trumpets Fade (1998); and A Lesson Before Dying (1999), starring Don Cheadle.

He was later appointed president of HBO Films, based in Los Angeles, which rapidly developed a reputation for consistently producing an award-winning slate of television and feature films, and was a founding member of HBO's Programming Group.

During his tenure, Callender oversaw the production of over 115 award-winning movies and mini-series, among them:

- Empire Falls (2005) – Fred Schepisi's star-studded adaptation of Richard Russo's Pulitzer Prize-winning novel starring Paul Newman and Joanne Woodward in their final roles together, along with Ed Harris, Philip Seymour Hoffman and Robin Wright Penn.
- Angels in America (2003) – Mike Nichols' acclaimed adaptation of Tony Kushner's Pulitzer Prize winning play, starring Al Pacino, Meryl Streep and Emma Thompson, which received 11 Emmy and 5 Golden Globe awards and which IndieWire recently anointed the best mini-series of the last century.
- John Adams (2008) – the Tom Hanks-produced, and Tom Hooper-directed mini-series based on David McCullough's best-selling historical biography starring Paul Giamatti and Laura Linney, which won 13 Emmy Awards and 4 Golden Globes, and still holds the record for the most wins for a programme in the history of the Emmy awards;
- Recount (2008) – Jay Roach's Emmy and Golden Globe-winning recreation of the controversial events surrounding the Florida recount that decided the outcome of the 2000 election written by Danny Strong;

Callender was also responsible for HBO's theatrical films such as the breakout indie hit My Big Fat Greek Wedding (2002) and Gus Van Sant's provocative movie Elephant (2003), about a Columbine-like high school shooting, which won Best Director Award as well as the coveted Palm d'Or at the 2003 Cannes Film Festival.

Under Callender's stewardship, HBO Films received:

- 140 Emmy Awards (475 Nominations);
- 44 Golden Globe Awards (145 Nominations);
- The Golden Globe for Best Movie or Mini-Series for 8 years in a row;
- 11 Peabody Awards;
- 13 Humanitas Awards;
- 5 Academy Awards;
- Top prizes at the Sundance Film Festival 4 years in a row;
- The Palme d'Or at the 2003 Cannes Film Festival.

In 2002, Callender received the Writers Guild of America East's Evelyn F. Burkey Award. In 2006, he received the Humanitas Prize's Kieser Award for his work supporting writers and making high-quality TV dramas at HBO Films. He was the first film executive to receive each award.

=== Picturehouse ===
Callender was also the driving force behind HBO's joint venture with New Line Cinema – the distribution company Picturehouse whose slate included Robert Altman's highly acclaimed Prairie Home Companion (2006), Kit Kittredge: An American Girl (2008), Run Fatboy Run (2007), Rocket Science (2007), Last Days (2005), Mary Harron's The Notorious Bettie Page (2005), JA Bayona's The Orphanage (2007), Olivier Dahan's La Vie en Rose (2007) for which Marion Cotillard won the Academy Award for Best Actress, and Guillermo del Toro's Pan's Labyrinth (2006) that won three Oscars at the 2006 Academy Awards.

=== Playground Entertainment ===
In 2009, Callender left HBO Films and moved to New York to produce theatre. He founded Playground Entertainment in 2012.

==== Theatre ====
Playground's first stage production was Lucky Guy (2014), starring Tom Hanks, by the late Nora Ephron, which tells the story of tabloid reporter Mike McAlary, winner of a 1998 Pulitzer Prize. It won two Tony Awards and had six nominations. In 2014, Callender produced Harvey Fierstein's Casa Valentina, which was nominated for four Tony Awards, including Best Play, and Hedwig and the Angry Inch (2015), starring Neil Patrick Harris, which won four Tony Awards, including Best Revival of a Musical. Callender also produced Kenneth Branagh's New York stage debut in Macbeth (2014) at the Park Avenue Armory, and co-produced of Jez Butterworth's The River (2014), starring Hugh Jackman.

Broadway productions include Dear Evan Hansen (2017), which won six Tony Awards, including Best Musical, and Robert Icke and Duncan Macmillan's 1984 (2017), based on the novel by George Orwell. West End productions include Dreamgirls (2016) and The Glass Menagerie (2016–2022), both produced alongside Sonia Friedman Productions.

Alongside Sonia Friedman Productions and Harry Potter Theatrical Productions, Callender produced the two-part stage play Harry Potter and the Cursed Child (2016–present), an expansion of the Harry Potter franchise, which opened on 30 July 2016 at London's Palace Theatre. In 2017, Harry Potter and the Cursed Child won nine Olivier Awards, the biggest single win ever for one production in the history of the awards. Harry Potter and the Cursed Child opened on Broadway on 22 April 2018 in the newly renovated Lyric Theatre and was nominated for ten Tony Awards and went on to win six, including Best Play. Harry Potter and the Cursed Child opened in Melbourne's Princess Theatre in early 2019, in San Francisco's Curran Theatre in the Fall of 2019, in Hamburg's Mehr! Theatre in 2020, in Toronto's CAA Ed Mirvish Theatre in 2022, and in Tokyo's TBS Akasaka Act Theatre in 2022. In 2024, the show started its US National Tour, with performances scheduled in Chicago, Los Angeles, and Washington, D.C.

==== Television ====
Playground company has produced over 180 hours of television since its inception. Series include the Golden Globe and Emmy-nominated miniseries Dancing on the Edge (2013) for BBC and Starz; the Golden Globe and Emmy-nominated miniseries The White Queen (2013) for BBC and Starz and its sequels The White Princess (2017) for Starz; the Golden Globe nominated anthology series The Missing (2014–2016) for BBC and Starz; Dracula (2013) for NBC; Wolf Hall (2015), a Golden Globe and BAFTA-winning six-part miniseries starring Mark Rylance, Damian Lewis and Claire Foy for BBC and Masterpiece, which was an adaptation of Hilary Mantel's Booker prize winning novels Wolf Hall and Bring Up the Bodies; and The Dresser (2015), a television adaptation of Ronald Harwood's classic play starring Ian McKellen and Anthony Hopkins for BBC and Starz.

In 2017, Callender produced Academy Award winner Kenneth Lonergan's adaptation of Howards End for the BBC and Starz, Heidi Thomas's adaptation of Little Women for the BBC and Masterpiece, and Richard Eyre's adaptation of King Lear starring Anthony Hopkins and Emma Thompson for the BBC and Amazon Prime Video.

Callender produced Lucy Kirkwood's adaptation of her play Chimerica (2019) for Channel 4; The Spanish Princess (2019), a sequel to The White Queen and The White Princess, for Starz; Peter Kosminsky's The Undeclared War (2022–present) starring Simon Pegg, Hannah Khalique-Brown, Adrian Lester and Mark Rylance for Channel 4 and Peacock; and a reimagining of the classic novel Dangerous Liaisons (2022) for Starz.

More recent productions under Playground include the Emmy-nominated Wolf Hall: The Mirror and the Light (2024), the second and final adaptation of the Wolf Hall novels by Hilary Mantel; Small Town, Big Story (2025), created by Chris O'Dowd in association with Sky Studios; and The Hardacres (2025–present), based on C. L. Skelton's book series. Callender currently produces the hit adaptation of James Herriot's All Creatures Great and Small for Channel 5 and Masterpiece on PBS.

Television productions include Maigret (2025–present), based on the celebrated Georges Simenon detective novel series and starring Benjamin Wainwright & Stefanie Martini; and Lynley (2025–present), based on Elizabeth George's hit crime novels; Treasure Island (2026), based on Robert Louis Stevenson's 18th century epic; and Up to No Good (2026), based on the short story by Helene Tursten and starring Glenn Close.

== Credits ==
=== Primetime television ===
==== Television ====
- Swallows and Amazons (1984)
- Separate Tables (1983)
- Mr. Halpern and Mr. Johnson (1983)
- The Captain's Doll (1983)
- The Deadly Game (1982)
- The Life and Adventure of Nicholas Nickleby (1982)
- Brendon Chase (1980–1981)

=== The Callender Company ===
==== Television ====
- Prisoner of Honour (1991)
- The Last Resort with Jonathan Ross (1987–1997)
- The Bretts (1987)
- Timeslip (1985)
- White City (1985)
- Arch of Triumph (1984)
- Scrabble (1984–1985)

==== Feature films ====
- Madame Sousatzka (1988)
- The Belly of an Architect (1987)

=== HBO ===
Television films

- Temple Grandin (2010)
- Into the Storm (2009)
- Grey Gardens (2009)
- Taking Chance (2009)
- My Zinc Bed (2008)
- Recount (2008)
- A Number (2008)
- Life Support (2007)
- Bury My Heart at Wounded Knee (2007)
- Walkout (2006)
- Longford (2006)
- Starter for Ten (2006)
- As You Like It (2006)
- Pinochet's Last Stand (2006)
- Pu-239 (2006)
- Bernard and Doris (2006)
- Lackawanna Blues (2005)
- Sometimes in April (2005)
- Warm Springs (2005)
- The Girl in the Café (2005)
- Mrs. Harris (2005)
- Angel Rodriguez (2005)
- Iron Jawed Angels (2004)
- Everyday People (2004)
- Strip Search (2004)
- Something the Lord Made (2004)
- The Life and Death of Peter Sellers (2004)
- Dirty War (2004)
- Yesterday (2004)
- The Fever (2004)
- Normal (2003)
- My House in Umbria (2003)
- Undefeated (2003)
- And Starring Pancho Villa as Himself (2003)
- The Laramie Project (2002)
- The Gathering Storm (2002)
- Path to War (2002)
- Point of Origin (2002)
- Hysterical Blindness (2002)
- Live from Baghdad (2002)
- Boycott (2001)
- Wit (2001)
- 61* (2001)
- Conspiracy (2001)
- Dinner with Friends (2001)
- Shot in the Heart (2001)
- If These Walls Could Talk 2 (2000)
- The Last of the Blonde Bombshells (2000)
- Cheaters (2000)
- For Love or Country: The Arturo Sandoval Story (2000)
- Disappearing Acts (2000)
- Dancing in September (2000)
- Middle Passage (2000)
- Lumumba (2000)
- A Lesson Before Dying (1999)
- RKO 281 (1999)
- Witness Protection (1999)
- The Pentagon Wars (1998)
- Always Outnumbered (1998)
- When Trumpets Fade (1998)
- Miss Evers' Boys (1997)
- In the Gloaming (1997)
- Path to Paradise (1997)
- Hostile Waters (1997)
- Subway Stories: Tales from the Underground (1997)
- First Time Felon (1997)
- Deadly Voyage (1996)
- If These Walls Could Talk (1996)
- Mistrial (1996)
- The Infiltrator (1995)
- State of Emergency (1994)
- Doomsday Gun (1994)
- Daybreak (1993)
- Strapped (1993)
- Mi Vida Loca (1993)
- A Private Matter (1992)
- Hostages (1992)
- Prison Stories: Women on the Inside (1991)
- One Man's War (1991)
- Women and Men 2 (1991)
- Prisoner of Honour (1991)
- Dead Ahead (1991)
- Fellow Traveller (1990)
- Women and Men: Stories of Seduction (1990)
- Criminal Justice (1990)
- The Tragedy of Flight 103 (1990)
- Dead Man Out (1989)
- Time Flies When You're Alive (1989)
- Tailspin (1989)
- Age-Old Friends (1989)
- Lip Service (1988)
- Tidy Endings (1988)
- The Christmas Wife (1988)

Television miniseries

- The Pacific (2010)
- John Adams (2008)
- House of Saddam (2008)
- Generation Kill (2008)
- Five Days (2007)
- Tsunami: The Aftermath (2006)
- Empire Falls (2005)
- Elizabeth I (2005)
- Angels in America (2003)

Feature films

- Kit Kittredge: An American Girl (2008)
- La Vie En Rose (2007)
- Rocket Science (2007)
- Pan's Labyrinth (2006)
- A Prairie Home Companion (2006)
- The Notorious Betty Page (2005)
- Last Days (2005)
- Maria Full of Grace (2004)
- Elephant (2003)
- American Splendor (2003)
- Real Women Have Curves (2002)
- My Big Fat Greek Wedding (2002)

=== Playground ===
Television

- Up to No Good (2026)
- Treasure Island (2026)
- Lynley (2025-present)
- Small Town, Big Story (2025)
- Wolf Hall: The Mirror and the Light (2025)
- Maigret (2025-present)
- The Hardacres (2024-present)
- The Undeclared War (2022-present)
- Dangerous Liaisons (2022)
- All Creatures Great and Small (2020-present)
- The Spanish Princess (2019-2020)
- Chimerica (2019)
- King Lear (2018)
- Little Women (2017)
- Howards End (2017)
- The White Princess (2017)
- The Dresser (2015)
- Wolf Hall (2015)
- The Missing (2014-2016)
- Dracula (2013)
- The White Queen (2013)
- Dancing on the Edge (2013)

Theater

- Basura (2026)
- Springwood (2026)
- New York, New York (2023)
- Harry Potter and the Cursed Child (2016–present)
- Dear Evan Hansen (2016–2022)
- Rosmersholm (2019), in the West End
- 1984 (2017), on Broadway
- The Glass Menagerie (2017), in the West End
- Dreamgirls (2016–2022), in the West End
- The River (2014), on Broadway
- Hedwig and the Angry Inch (2014–2015), on Broadway
- Macbeth (2014), at the Park Avenue Armory in New York
- Casa Valentina (2014), on Broadway
- Lucky Guy (2013), on Broadway

== Awards and nominations ==
Year	Award	Category	Nominated work	Result
1983	Primetime Emmy Award	Outstanding Limited Series	The Life and Adventures of Nicholas Nickleby	Won
2002	Writers Guild of America Awards	Evelyn F. Burkey Award	Colin Callender	Won
2003	Anti-Defamation League	Humanitarian Award	Colin Callender	Won
2003	Creative Coalition	Visionary Award	Colin Callender	Won
2006	Geffen Playhouse	Distinction in Theater Award	Colin Callender	Won
2006	Jacob Burns Film Center	Vision Award	Colin Callender	Won
2006	Humanitas Prize	Kiezer Award	Colin Callender	Won
2013	Tony Award	Best Play	Lucky Guy	Nominated
2013	Drama League Award	Outstanding Play	Lucky Guy	Nominated
2013	Outer Critic’s Circle Award	Outstanding Play	Lucky Guy	Nominated
2014	Tony Award	Best Play	Casa Valentina	Nominated
2014	Drama League Award	Outstanding Play	Casa Valentina	Nominated
2014	Outer Critic’s Circle Award	Outstanding Play	Casa Valentina	Nominated
2013	Satellite Award	Best Miniseries or Television Film	The White Queen	Nominated
2013	Golden Globe Award	Best Limited Series or Motion Picture Made for Television	The White Queen	Nominated
2013	Satellite Award	Best Miniseries or Television Film	Dancing on the Edge	Won
2014	Critic’s Choice Television Award	Best Limited Series	Dancing on the Edge	Nominated
2014	Golden Globe Award	Best Limited Series or Motion Picture Made for Television	Dancing on the Edge	Nominated
2014	Online Film and Television Association Award	Best Miniseries	Dancing on the Edge	Nominated
2014	Golden Globe Award	Best Limited Series or Motion Picture Made for Television	The Missing	Nominated
2014	Drama League Award	Outstanding Production of a Broadway or Off-Broadway Play	Lucky Guy	Nominated
2014	Drama League Award	Outstanding Production of a Broadway or Off-Broadway Musical	Hedwig and the Angry Inch	Won
2014	Drama League Award	Outstanding Production of a Broadway or Off-Broadway Play	Casa Valentina	Nominated
2014	Outer Critics Circle Award	Outstanding New Broadway Play	Casa Valentina	Nominated
2014	Outer Critics Circle Award	Outstanding Revival of a Musical	Hedwig and the Angry Inch	Won
2014	Drama Desk Award	Outstanding Revival of a Broadway or Off-Broadway Musical	Hedwig and the Angry Inch	Won
2014	Tony Award	Best Play	Casa Valentina	Nominated
2014	Tony Award	Best Revival of a Musical	Hedwig and the Angry Inch	Won
2014	People's Choice Award	Favorite TV Movie / Miniseries	The White Queen	Nominated
2014	Primetime Emmy Award	Outstanding Limited Series	The White Queen	Nominated
2014	Online Film and Television Association Award	Best Miniseries	The White Queen	Nominated
2014	Satellite Award	Best Miniseries or Motion Picture Made for Television	The White Queen	Nominated
2015	BAFTA Television Award	Best Drama Series	The Missing	Nominated
2015	BAFTA Television Award	Audience Award	The Missing	Nominated
2015	Golden Nymph Award	Best Long Form Fiction Series	The Missing	Nominated
2015	Golden Globe Award	Best Limited Series or Motion Picture Made for Television	Wolf Hall	Won
2015	Peabody Award	Entertainment Programming	Wolf Hall	Won
2015	Primetime Emmy Award	Outstanding Limited Series	Wolf Hall	Nominated
2015	Critic's Choice Television Award	Best Miniseries	Wolf Hall	Nominated
2015	Satellite Award	Best Miniseries or Television Film	Wolf Hall	Nominated
2016	BAFTA Television Award	Best Drama Series	Wolf Hall	Won
2016	Broadcasting Press Guild Award	Best Drama Series	Wolf Hall	Won
2016	Royal Television Society Award	Best Drama Serial	Wolf Hall	Nominated
2016	Golden Nymph Award	Best Long Form Fiction Series	Wolf Hall	Nominated
2016	Television Critics Association Award	Outstanding Achievement in Movie or Miniseries	Wolf Hall	Nominated
2016	Golden Globe Award	Best Limited Series or Motion Picture Made for Television	The Dresser	Nominated
2016	Satellite Award	Best Miniseries or Television Film	The Dresser	Nominated
2016	Evening Standard Theatre Award	Best Play	Harry Potter and the Cursed Child	Won
2016	Outer Critics Circle Award	Outstanding New Off-Broadway Musical	Dear Evan Hansen	Won
2016	Drama League Award	Outstanding Production of a Broadway or Off-Broadway Musical	Dear Evan Hansen	Nominated
2017	Drama League Award	Outstanding Production of a Broadway or Off-Broadway Musical	Dear Evan Hansen	Won
2017	Lucille Lortel Award	Outstanding Musical	Dear Evan Hansen	Nominated
2017	Tony Award	Best Musical	Dear Evan Hansen	Won
2017	WhatsOnStage Award	Best New Musical	Dreamgirls	Nominated
2017	WhatsOnStage Award	Best New Play	Harry Potter and the Cursed Child	Won
2017	South Bank Sky Arts Award	Theatre Award	Harry Potter and the Cursed Child	Won
2017	Laurence Olivier Award	Best New Play	Harry Potter and the Cursed Child	Won
2017	Laurence Olivier Award	Best New Musical	Dreamgirls	Nominated
2017	Laurence Olivier Award	Best Revival	The Glass Menagerie	Nominated
2018	Drama League Award	Best Production of a Broadway or Off-Broadway Play	Harry Potter and the Cursed Child	Won
2018	Outer Critics Circle Award	Outstanding New Broadway Play	Harry Potter and the Cursed Child	Won
2018	Tony Award	Best Play	Harry Potter and the Cursed Child	Won
2018	WhatsOnStage Award	Best West End Show	Harry Potter and the Cursed Child	Won
2018	South Bank Sky Arts Award	Television Award	Howards End	Won
2018	BAFTA Television Award	Best Miniseries	Howards End	Nominated
2018	Golden Nymph Award	Best Long Form Fiction Series	Howards End	Nominated
2018	Television Critics Association Award	Outstanding Achievement in Movie or Miniseries	Howards End	Nominated
2018	National Television Award	Best New Drama	Howards End	Nominated
2019	Producer’s Guild Award	Outstanding Producer of Streamed or Televised Motion Pictures	King Lear	Nominated
2019	Primetime Emmy Award	Outstanding Motion Picture Made for Television	King Lear	Nominated
2019	C21 International Drama Award	Best TV Movie	King Lear	Nominated
2019	Critic’s Choice Television Award	Best Movie Made for Television	King Lear	Nominated
2019	Satellite Award	Best TV Movie	King Lear	Nominated
2019	Helpmann Award	Best Play	Harry Potter and the Cursed Child	Nominated
2020	Laurence Olivier Award	Best New Musical	Dear Evan Hansen	Won
2020	Laurence Olivier Award	Best Revival	Rosmersholm	Nominated
2021	Broadcasting Press Guild Award	Best Drama Series	All Creatures Great and Small	Nominated
2021	Shanghai International TV Festival Magnolia Award	Best Foreign TV Film/Miniseries	All Creatures Great and Small	Nominated
2021	TV Times Awards	Favourite Drama	All Creatures Great and Small	Nominated
2022	German Live Entertainment Award	Show of the Year	Harry Potter and the Cursed Child	Won
2022	TV Choice Awards	Best Drama Series	All Creatures Great and Small	Nominated
2022	Kikuta Kazuo Theatre	Grand Prize	Harry Potter and the Cursed Child	Won
2023	Tony Award	Best Musical	New York, New York	Nominated
2023	TV Choice Awards	Best Drama Series	All Creatures Great and Small	Nominated
2024	National Television Awards	Returning Drama	All Creatures Great and Small	Nominated
2024	Royal Television Society Yorkshire Awards	Best Drama	All Creatures Great and Small	Nominated
2024	Shanghai International TV Festival Magnolia Award	Best Foreign TV Series	All Creatures Great and Small	Nominated
2024	TV Times Awards	Favourite Returning Drama	All Creatures Great and Small	Nominated
2025	TV Choice Awards	Best Drama Series	All Creatures Great and Small	Won
2025	Royal Television Society West of England Awards	Best Drama Series	All Creatures Great and Small	Nominated
2025	BAFTA Television Award	Best Drama Series	Wolf Hall: The Mirror and the Light	Nominated
2025	Broadcast Press Guild Award	BPG Jury Award for Excellence in British Drama	Wolf Hall: The Mirror and the Light	Won
2025	Broadcast Press Guild Award	Best Drama Series	Wolf Hall: The Mirror and the Light	Nominated
2025	Royal Television Society West of England Awards	Scripted Production (Playground Entertainment and Company Pictures)	Wolf Hall: The Mirror and the Light	Nominated
2025	BAFTA Television	Best Drama Series	Wolf Hall: The Mirror and the Light	Nominated
2025	C21 International Drama Awards	Returning Drama Series	Wolf Hall: The Mirror and the Light	Nominated
2025	TV Times Awards	Favourite Returning Drama	All Creatures Great and Small	Nominated

== Personal life ==
He is married to attorney Elizabeth Gaine, and they have two daughters, Caroline and Charlotte. He also has a son, Ian, from a previous marriage.

Callender was appointed Commander of the Order of the British Empire (CBE) in the 2003 Birthday Honours for services to the UK film and television industries in the USA and was knighted in the 2016 New Year Honours for services to the British creative industries, promoting British film, theatre and television in international markets

Callender is a trustee and supporter of the NYU Tisch School of the Arts, the New York Public Theater, and The Creative Coalition. He has also served as a trustee of the New York branch of the British Academy of Film and Television Arts.
