= Playground Entertainment =

Television and theater production company in New York and London

The Playground, LLC
- Trade name: Playground Entertainment
- Company type: Private
- Industry: Entertainment
- Founded: 2012; 14 years ago
- Founder: Sir Colin Callender CBE
- Headquarters: New York and London
- Joint managing directors: Scott Huff; David Stern

The Playground, LLC, commonly referred to as Playground Entertainment, is an independent television, film, and theater production company based in New York and London. It was founded in 2012 by Sir Colin Callender, former President of HBO Films.

Since its inception, Playground Entertainment has developed a reputation for producing sophisticated television and theater for British and American audiences. The company's projects have collectively won nine BAFTA Television Awards, two Golden Globe Awards, 14 Olivier Awards, 19 Tony Awards, been nominated for 17 Emmy Awards, and received a Peabody Award.

Notable Playground productions include Wolf Hall (2015), Harry Potter and the Cursed Child (2016–present), All Creatures Great and Small (2020–present), and Wolf Hall: The Mirror and the Light (2024).

== Television productions (2013–present) ==
Playground Entertainment has produced over 180 hours of television. Notable past productions include Dracula (2013) for NBC; Emmy-nominated The White Queen (2013) and its followups The White Princess (2017) and The Spanish Princess (2019) for Starz; BAFTA and Golden Globe-winning Dancing on The Edge (2013) for BBC and Starz; Golden Globe-nominated anthology series The Missing (2014–2016) for BBC and Starz; and Golden Globe and BAFTA-winning Wolf Hall (2015), a six-part miniseries based on Hilary Mantel's Booker Prize-winning novels Wolf Hall and Bring Up the Bodies, for BBC and Masterpiece.

Other television productions include The Dresser (2015), an adaptation of Ronald Harwood’s classic play starring Ian McKellen and Anthony Hopkins for BBC and Starz; Little Women (2017), for BBC and Starz; Kenneth Lonergan’s BAFTA-nominated adaptation of Howards End (2017), for BBC and Starz; Richard Eyre’s Emmy-nominated adaptation of King Lear (2018) starring Anthony Hopkins and Emma Thompson for BBC and Amazon Prime Video; Chimerica (2019) starring Alessandro Nivola and F. Murray Abraham for Channel 4; and Dangerous Liaisons (2022) for Starz.

Playground current television productions include James Herriot's All Creatures Great and Small (2020–present), returning for its seventh season on Channel 5 and PBS; Peter Kosminsky's The Undeclared War (2022–present) for Channel 4 and Peacock; The Hardacres (2024–present), based on C. L. Skelton celebrated book series, for Channel 5; and Wolf Hall: The Mirror and the Light (2024), the much-anticipated sequel based on Hilary Mantel’s novels, nominated for five Royal Television Society Awards.

In December 2024, Playground Entertainment acquired the television adaptation rights to The Great When, the first novel in Alan Moore's planned five-volume Long London fantasy series, with plans to develop a multi-season television adaptation. It was part of the company's shift from television films and miniseries toward returning television series.

As of April 2025, Playground Entertainment has seven shows in production.

More recent television productions include Maigret (2025–present), based on Georges Simenon's Jules Maigret novels, for Masterpiece on PBS and UKTV; Chris O'Dowd's Small Town, Big Story (2025) for Sky; Lynley (2025–present), based on Elizabeth George's Inspector Lynley novels, for BBC and BritBox; Treasure Island (2026), for MGM+ and Paramount+, based on Robert Louis Stevenson's classic novel, starring David Oyelowo and Hayley Atwell; and Up to No Good (2026), for Channel 4 and Sony Pictures Television, starring Glenn Close and Claudia Jessie.

== Theater productions (2013–present) ==
Playground Entertainment debuted on stage with Lucky Guy (2013), written by Nora Ephron and starring Tom Hanks in his Broadway debut. The play follows Pulitzer Prize-winning reporter Mike McAlary and won two Tony Awards (out of six nominations). In 2014, Playground produced Harvey Fierstein’s Casa Valentina, which was nominated for four Tony Awards, including Best Play, and Hedwig and the Angry Inch starring Neil Patrick Harris, which won four Tony Awards, including Best Revival of a Musical. Playground also produced Kenneth Branagh’s New York stage debut in Macbeth at the Park Avenue Armory and co-produced Jez Butterworth's The River, starring Hugh Jackman.

More recent projects include the Broadway and West End productions of Dear Evan Hansen (2015–2022). The play won six Tony Awards on Broadway, including Best Musical, and three Olivier Awards on the West End. Other productions include the West End revival of Dreamgirls (2016), which won two Olivier Awards; Duncan Macmillan’s 1984 (2016), based on George Orwell’s novel; the West End revival of The Glass Menagerie (2017), which was nominated for seven Olivier Awards; the West End revival of Rosmersholm (2019), which was nominated for five Olivier Awards; New York, New York (2023), which was nominated for nine Tony Awards; and Springwood (2026), written by Olivier and Tony Award-winning playwright Richard Nelson.

Playground is producing the musical Basura (2026), with music and lyrics by Gloria Estefan and Emily Estefan and a book by Karen Zacarías. The musical made its world premiere at the Alliance Theatre in Atlanta, Georgia, in June 2026.

== Harry Potter and the Cursed Child (2016–present) ==
Alongside Sonia Friedman Productions and Harry Potter Theatrical Productions, Playground is a producer of global mega-hit Harry Potter and the Cursed Child (2016), an expansion of the Harry Potter franchise. The play opened on July 30, 2016, in London's Palace Theatre. Harry Potter and the Cursed Child won nine Olivier Awards, the biggest single win ever for one production in the history of the awards. Harry Potter and the Cursed Child opened on Broadway on April 22, 2018, in the newly renovated Lyric Theatre. The play was nominated for ten Tony Awards, winning six, including Best Play.

Harry Potter and the Cursed Child has seen major success beyond Broadway and the West End. The play opened in Melbourne’s Princess Theatre in early 2019 and was nominated for seven Helpmann Awards, winning one. Harry Potter and the Cursed Child also ran in San Francisco’s Curran Theatre (2019–2022), in Hamburg’s Mehr! Theatre (2020–2026), in Toronto's CAA Ed Mirvish Theatre (2022–2023), and in Tokyo's TBS Akasaka Act Theatre (2023–present). The US National Tour of Harry Potter and the Cursed Child began in fall 2024 in Chicago's James M. Nederlander Theatre. It has made appearances at the Hollywood Pantages Theatre in Los Angeles and the National Theatre in Washington, D.C.

== List of productions ==
Television

- Up to No Good (2026)
- Treasure Island (2026)
- Lynley (2025–present)
- Maigret (2025–present)
- Small Town, Big Story (2025)
- Wolf Hall: The Mirror and the Light (2024)
- The Hardacres (2024–present)
- The Undeclared War (2022–present)
- Dangerous Liaisons (2022)
- All Creatures Great and Small (2020–present)
- The Spanish Princess (2019–2020)
- Chimerica (2019)
- King Lear (2018)
- Little Women (2017)
- Howards End (2017)
- The White Princess (2017)
- The Dresser (2015)
- Wolf Hall (2015)
- The Missing (2014–2016)
- Dracula (2013)
- The White Queen (2013)
- Dancing on the Edge (2013)

Theater

- Basura (2026)
- Springwood (2026)
- New York, New York (2023)
- Harry Potter and the Cursed Child (2016–present)
- Dear Evan Hansen (2016–2022)
- Rosmersholm (2019), in the West End
- 1984 (2017), on Broadway
- The Glass Menagerie (2017), in the West End
- Dreamgirls (2016), in the West End
- The River (2014), on Broadway
- Hedwig and the Angry Inch (2014–2015), on Broadway
- Macbeth (2014), at the Park Avenue Armory in New York
- Casa Valentina (2014), on Broadway
- Lucky Guy (2013), on Broadway
