= Wolf Hall: The Mirror and the Light =

2024 British television drama series

- Genre: Historical drama
- Based on: The Mirror & the Light by Hilary Mantel
- Written by: Peter Straughan
- Directed by: Peter Kosminsky
- Starring: Mark Rylance; Damian Lewis; Kate Phillips; Lilit Lesser; Jonathan Pryce; Thomas Brodie-Sangster; Timothy Spall; Harriet Walter; Joss Porter
- Composer: Debbie Wiseman
- Country of origin: United Kingdom
- Original language: English
- No. of series: 1
- No. of episodes: 6

Production
- Executive producers: Colin Callender; Noëlette Buckley; Peter Kosminsky; Lucy Richer; Susanne Simpson
- Producer: Lisa Osborne
- Production companies: Company Pictures; Playground Entertainment

Original release
- Network: BBC One
- Release: 10 November – 15 December 2024

Wolf Hall: The Mirror and the Light is a historical drama television series that first aired in 2024. It is the second and final part of the adaptation of the Wolf Hall novels by Hilary Mantel, covering The Mirror & the Light, the final novel in the trilogy.

Mark Rylance reprised the lead role of Thomas Cromwell from the 2015 series, Wolf Hall. Director Peter Kosminsky and writer Peter Straughan also returned. The Mirror and the Light, like its predecessor, received critical acclaim.

== Premise ==
The series begins with Thomas Cromwell navigating the Tudor court in the aftermath of the 1536 execution of Henry VIII's second wife, Anne Boleyn, and the monarch about to marry his third wife, Jane Seymour.

== Cast ==
- Mark Rylance as Thomas Cromwell
- Damian Lewis as Henry VIII
- Lilit Lesser as Princess Mary
- Jonathan Pryce as Cardinal Wolsey
- Thomas Brodie-Sangster as Ralph Sadler
- Timothy Spall as Duke of Norfolk
- Harriet Walter as Lady Margaret Pole
- Karim Kadjar as Eustache Chapuys
- Charlie Rowe as Gregory Cromwell
- Lydia Leonard as Jane Rochford
- Harry Melling as Thomas Wriothesley
- Kate Phillips as Jane Seymour
- Richard Dillane as Duke of Suffolk
- Joss Porter as Richard Cromwell
- Will Keen as Thomas Cranmer
- Will Tudor as Edward Seymour
- Tom Mothersdale as Richard Rich
- Alex Jennings as Stephen Gardiner
- Lucy Russell as Lady Shelton
- James Larkin as Master Treasurer FitzWilliam
- Robert Wilfort as George Cavendish
- Thomas Arnold as Hans Holbein the Younger
- Hannah Steele as Mary Shelton
- Maisie Richardson-Sellers as Bess Oughtred
- Corentin Fila as Christophe
- Viola Prettejohn as Mary Fitzroy
- Jordan Kouamé as Martin the Gaoler
- Agnes O'Casey as Margaret Douglas
- Cecilia Appiah as Nan Seymour
- Ellie de Lange as Jenneke
- Hubert Burton as Thomas Howard the Younger
- Pip Carter as Geoffrey Pole
- Josef Altin as Thomas Avery
- Sarah Priddy as Margery Seymour
- Hannah Khalique-Brown as Dorothea
- Amir El-Masry as Thomas Wyatt
- German Segal as Olisleger
- Tim Scragg as John Lambert
- Summer Richards as Catherine Howard
- Dana Herfurth as Anne of Cleves
- Claire Foy as Anne Boleyn

== Production ==
In March 2022, Mark Rylance confirmed that a second series was in development with scripts being worked on for six episodes and Peter Kosminsky set to return as director. Hilary Mantel was acting as consultant on the script adaptation at the time of her death in September 2022. Kominsky, who worked closely with Mantel on the first series and had received installments of the original text as Mantel was writing the third installment of her historical trilogy, published in 2020, said that the series would continue as a "memorial" to the author. Peter Straughan had again adapted the book for the series, as he had in season one, with Playground and Company Pictures producing once more. In November 2023, it was reported that broadcaster Masterpiece PBS and the BBC were set to begin production on the series. It is produced by Lisa Osborne and executive produced by Colin Callender and Noëlette Buckley for Playground, Kosminsky and Lucy Richer for the BBC, and Susanne Simpson for Masterpiece. On 3 April 2024, the BBC reported that filming had completed and released new pictures and additional casting information. Dr Owen Emmerson was one of the consultants on the show.

=== Casting ===
As well as Mark Rylance returning as Thomas Cromwell, Damian Lewis also returns as King Henry VIII and Jonathan Pryce as Cardinal Wolsey. Kate Phillips also reprises her role as Henry VIII's third wife, Jane Seymour, with Lilit Lesser as Princess Mary. The following month it was reported that Timothy Spall, Harriet Walter and Harry Melling had been added to the cast, as well as Will Tudor, Will Keen and Viola Prettejohn. Timothy Spall took on the role of the Duke of Norfolk, following in the footsteps of Bernard Hill, who had died in 2024.

The casting of the courtiers was more 'diverse' (multiracial/multi-ethnic) for Wolf Hall: The Mirror and the Light than it was in the first part of the television series. This provoked some irritation and opposition. For example, the casting of Egyptian-British Amir El-Masry as Thomas Wyatt was criticized as being 'absurd' by Wyatt's descendant, journalist Petronella Wyatt.

=== Filming ===
Filming got underway in late 2023. The crew was reported to be shooting at Berkeley Castle in February 2024. The following month, filming took place at Wells Cathedral using it as the Palace of Whitehall, where Henry VIII married his third wife, Jane Seymour. Montacute House in South Somerset was used as Greenwich Palace, the site of Anne Boleyn's arrest. They also filmed at Forde Abbey, and Great Chalfield Manor, near Melksham, Wiltshire, was used for Austin Friars, the home of Thomas Cromwell. Gloucester Cathedral and Horton Court near Chipping Sodbury were also used. According to a PBS article, other locations included Hampton Court's Great Hall, Bishop Palace in Somerset, where Princess Mary is reintroduced to Henry, Haddon Hall in Derbyshire for a masked ball and an outdoor bowling scene, and Wolfeton House in Dorset as the site of Princess Mary's home.

== Broadcast ==
The series premiered in the UK on BBC One and BBC iPlayer on Sunday 10 November 2024 and was shown on BBC iPlayer as part of the original Wolf Hall television series. In the US, the series is scheduled to air weekly on PBS' Masterpiece starting March 23, 2025.

== Episodes ==
No. in series	Title	Directed by	Written by	Original air date (BBC One)	U.S. air date	UK viewers (millions)
1	"Wreckage"	Peter Kosminsky	Peter Straughan	10 November 2024	23 March 2025	4.06
The Mirror and the Light opens in the heartbeat after Anne Boleyn's death, as the young queen's blood is sluiced from the scaffold and Thomas Cromwell picks his way across the wreckage to take up his position as principal councillor to an unpredictable king.
2	"Obedience"	Peter Kosminsky	Peter Straughan	17 November 2024	30 March 2025	3.49
As the dissolution of the monasteries gathers speed, Cromwell makes a personal pilgrimage to Shaftesbury Abbey to speak with a young nun, who profoundly shakes his view of himself.
3	"Defiance"	Peter Kosminsky	Peter Straughan	24 November 2024	6 April 2025	3.40
Beginning in Yorkshire in October 1536, a rising in the north destabilises Henry's kingdom. Henry suspects that the rebellion has been secretly initiated by Henry Pole and Henry Courtenay. Despite the risks to his own life, Cromwell moves to protect Lady Mary from becoming the rebels' greatest prize.
4	"Jenneke"	Peter Kosminsky	Peter Straughan	1 December 2024	13 April 2025	3.23
The birth of a prince gives England the heir that Henry longs for, but at a terrible price. As the court grieves for Jane, it falls to Cromwell to find a fourth bride for the king.
5	"Mirror"	Peter Kosminsky	Peter Straughan	8 December 2024	20 April 2025	3.25
Cromwell's marital diplomacy brings Princess Anne of Cleves to Henry's court. Will the alliance create a Protestant superpower in northern Europe, or has Cromwell's luck run out?
6	"Light"	Peter Kosminsky	Peter Straughan	15 December 2024	27 April 2025	3.29
Cromwell is stripped of his titles and brought to the Tower of London on a charge of treason. He has no friends to speak for him but plenty of enemies among his prosecutors.

== Reception ==
=== Critical response ===
On the review aggregator website Rotten Tomatoes, Wolf Hall: The Mirror and the Light has an approval rating of 100% based on 24 critics' reviews, with an average rating of 9.3/10. The website's consensus reads: "Wolf Hall returns after a decade away without missing a beat, retaining its razor-sharp intelligence along with the irresistible alchemy of Mark Rylance and Damian Lewis' performances". Metacritic, which uses a weighted average, assigned a score of 89 out of 100, based on 13 critics, indicating "universal acclaim".

=== Accolades ===
The series was nominated for Best Drama Series with Peter Straughan nominated for Best Writer at the Royal Television Society Programme Awards in March 2025. At the Broadcast Press Guild Award in March 2025, it was nominated for the Best Actor (Mark Rylance), Best Drama Series, and Best Writer (Peter Straughan) awards, and won the Jury Award for Excellence in British Drama .

Award	Category	Recipients	Outcome
Royal Television Society Programme Awards	Best Drama Series	Wolf Hall: The Mirror and the Light	Nominated
Royal Television Society Programme Awards	Best Writing	Peter Straughan	Nominated
Broadcast Press Guild Awards	Best Actor	Mark Rylance	Nominated
Broadcast Press Guild Awards	Jury Award for Excellence in British Drama	Wolf Hall: The Mirror and the Light	Won
Broadcast Press Guild Awards	Best Writer	Peter Straughan	Nominated
Broadcast Press Guild Awards	Best Drama Series	Wolf Hall: The Mirror and the Light	Nominated
