= Cecilia Appiah =

English actress

- Born: London
- Education: Royal Welsh College of Music & Drama
- Occupation: Actress
- Years active: 2010-

Cecilia Appiah is an English stage, screen and voice actress.

== Early life ==
Appiah was born in West London. She graduated from the Royal Welsh College of Music & Drama and was a Carleton Hobbs Bursary winner.

== Career ==
As a child actress in 2010, she voiced Mary, daughter of Niamh Cusack's Helen in the BBC Radio 4 play Christmas by the Lake, which was broadcast on Christmas Day and also starred Robert Lindsay. She would later also provide voice work for the Big Finish Productions audio story The War Master: Self-Defence.

=== Stage ===
On the stage, she appeared in an adaptation of Andrea Levy's The Long Song at the Chichester Festival Theatre in 2021. She played Phoebe in Mike Bartlett’s Scandaltown at the Lyric Hammersmith in 2022. In 2023, she appeared as Estella in Tanika Gupta’s adaptation of Great Expectations, at Manchester’s Royal Exchange Theatre.

=== Film & television ===
She portrayed Carla in Doctor Strange in the Multiverse of Madness and Mona in Apple TV+ series Hijack. She also appeared in The Chelsea Detective and Channel 4 comedy series Toast of Tinseltown.

In 2024, she was cast as Nan Seymour, sister of Jane, in the BBC One adaptation of Hilary Mantel's Wolf Hall: The Mirror and the Light.

== Filmography ==
Year	Title	Role	Notes
2021	Casualty	Cleo	1 episode
2022	Toast of Tinseltown	Receptionist	4 episodes
2022	The Chelsea Detective	PC Lana Appelby	2 episodes
2022	Doctor Strange in the Multiverse of Madness	Carla	
2023	Torchwood: The Story Continues	Diana Lopez	Voice role
2023	Hijack	Mona	7 episodes
2024	Wolf Hall: The Mirror and the Light	Nan Seymour	
