= Postcards from London =

2018 film by Steve McLean

- Theatrical release poster
- Directed by: Steve McLean
- Written by: Steve McLean
- Produced by: Soledad Gatti-Pascual
- Starring: Harris Dickinson; Richard Durden; Jonah Hauer-King; Silas Carson; Leo Hatton; Leemore Marrett Jr.; Stephen Boxer; Trevor Cooper
- Cinematography: Annika Summerson
- Edited by: Stephen Boucher
- Music by: Julian Bayliss
- Production company: Diablo Films
- Distributed by: Peccadillo Pictures
- Release dates: 17 March 2018 (Melbourne Queer Film Festival); 17 August 2018 (United Kingdom)
- Running time: 88 minutes
- Country: United Kingdom
- Language: English
- Box office: $15,562

Postcards from London is a 2018 British drama film written and directed by Steve McLean. It is McLean's follow-up to his 1994 film Postcards from America, which he based on the work of David Wojnarowicz. The film follows a teenage boy, Jim (played by Harris Dickinson), who escapes his rural Essex town for London, only to find himself involved with a group of high-class gay escorts in Soho.

== Plot ==
At the National Gallery, an art tour guide is presenting a 16th-century Titian painting when Jim approaches the painting, and upon touching it, faints. Small-town Jim has come to Soho, London, to experience art, music and culture. While sleeping on the street, he is robbed. A barmaid, who describes him as having the face of an angel, sends him to a gay bar where David, Jesus, Marcello and Victor find him perfect to join their vocation. They are not only male prostitutes, but "raconteurs" servicing wealthy older men. He takes an oath to join in and be trained in the cultural arts of Soho.

Study starts with Caravaggio adding more art, poetry and literature to the mix. He also learns the sex trade with his own viewing booth. Jim really likes the education and meets with his first client, who is writing a book on Caravaggio. When shown a painting, Jim faints and imagines himself as the dead Christ, with the client also in the painting. He advises Jim to enjoy his youth. His next client is an old man whose fantasy involves recreating Ancient Rome, in which Jim is the dead Saint Sebastian. Jim feels guilty, so he refunds the fee. Jim soon becomes famous all over Soho. An artist named Max wants Jim to be his muse and reinvigorate his art career. After months of sitting, Jim has a real art painting of himself. Max appreciates the inspiration.

The group are concerned that Jim keeps fainting. David does not want Jim to "retire" so they send him to a doctor. He explains that when he sees beauty, it becomes part of him. If he sees a picture of Christ, he feels his suffering. The doctor shows him The Musicians by Caravaggio. He hears music and faints. He and his mates are in the painting in Rome in 1595. The artist appears and chastises the boys for talking while he is trying to paint. Just being pretty boys is not enough but he tenderly strokes Jim. When Jim awakens, he talks as if he personally knows the artist. Her diagnosis is Stendhal Syndrome. When a patient sees beauty, he becomes the art with emotional ecstasy.

Jim has blackouts and becomes various artists. Sometimes he is the artist Max. He is discussing his oversensitivity to art with a client and he sees Paul. Paul is the man Jim replaced in the group. Paul says that they were rent boys and quoted how Jim was recruited. Paul says he heard Jim has a special talent. Jim says it is a curse and is tired of talking. Paul solicits Jim and agrees to pay him for his time. Paul thinks they can make money if Jim's emotional response to art can determine genuine art from fake art. They have sex. Paul sets up a test. Jim thinks he has a sickness and Paul sees opportunity. His four mates feel betrayed. Two new guys solicit Jim. Doctor and Paul convince Jim that his talent is a service to the art world and he gets well paid. He suffers and faints with each masterpiece. Barmaid tells him to enjoy it while it lasts. The four raconteurs are looking for their next mate. Meanwhile, Jim is ready to create his own beauty.

== Cast ==
- Harris Dickinson as Jim
- Richard Durden as Max
- Jonah Hauer-King as David
- Alessandro Cimadmore as Jesus
- Leonardo Salerni as Marcello
- Raphael Desprez as Victor
- Leo Hatton as Mary Magdelene; The Doctor; The Nurse
- Silas Carson as George
- Leemore Marrett Jr. as Paul
- Stephen Boxer as Stuart
- Trevor Cooper as Tony
- Ben Cura as Caravaggio

== Release ==
=== Film festivals ===
- Melbourne Queer Film Festival, Melbourne, Australia (17 March 2018)
- BFI Flare: London LGBT Film Festival (31 March 2018)
- OUTshine Film Fest, Miami, United States (April 2018)
- Lovers Film Festival – Torino LGBTQI Visions, Turin, Italy (April 2018)
- Pink Apple, Zürich, Switzerland (May 2018)
- TLVFest, Tel Aviv, Israel (10 June 2018)
- Frameline Film Festival (16 June 2018)
- Filmfest München, Munich, Germany (30 June 2018)
- Outfest, Los Angeles, US (October 2018)

== Reception ==
On the review aggregator website Rotten Tomatoes, 50% of 18 critics' reviews are positive. Metacritic, which uses a weighted average, assigned the film a score of 42 out of 100, based on 9 critics, indicating "mixed or average" reviews.
