= German Segal =

Russian actor (born 1995)

- Герман Сегал
- Born: 7 June 1995 (age 31); Izhevsk, Udmurt Republic, Russia
- Education: Moscow Art Theatre School; Royal Central School of Speech and Drama
- Occupation: Actor
- Years active: 2017–present
- Agent: United Agents
- Website: www.germansegal.co.uk

German Sergeyevich Segal (Russian: Герман Сергеевич Сегал, romanized: German Sergeyevich Segal; born 7 June 1995) is a Russian stage and screen actor based in London. He gained international notice for playing hacker Vadim Trusov in the Channel 4 series The Undeclared War (2022), and for portraying diplomat Henry Olisleger in the BBC / PBS miniseries Wolf Hall: The Mirror and the Light (2024).

== Early life and training ==
Segal was born in Izhevsk to a family of educators and lawyers. He finished the acting course at the Moscow Art Theatre School in 2018, and earned an MA in Acting for Screen with Distinction from the Royal Central School of Speech and Drama in 2023. In London, he became active in the Forum of Russian-speaking Actors.

== Career ==
Segal's feature-film debut was the WWII drama The Red Ghost (2020).

His English-language breakthrough came as Vadim Trusov in Peter Kosminsky's cyber-thriller The Undeclared War, whose story has been described by The Sydney Morning Herald as "alarmingly close to real-world events". Sobaka.ru listed it among August 2022's must-see shows. A second season, to be directed by Paul McGuigan, is in development.

In 2024, Segal reunited with Kosminsky to play the German ambassador Henry Olisleger opposite Henry VIII in Wolf Hall: The Mirror and the Light.

German's short film Covening went on to win Best Dark Comedy nomination at the New York International Film Awards for October 2024.

Segal has also appeared on the London stage. In 2026 he performed at the Golden Goose Theatre in Ramin Gray's contemporary staging of Oscar Wilde's An Ideal Husband. The production reinterpreted Wilde’s political comedy in a modern setting and featured an international ensemble cast.

== Filmography ==
=== Film ===
Year	Title	Role	Notes	Source
2020	The Red Ghost	Adler		
2021	Virazh	Rinat	Supporting role	
2024	Covening	Adam	Short film, also director	

=== Television ===
Year	Title	Role	Notes	Source
2018	Sinichka 2	Ignat Kalinin	Recurring role	
2020	The Young and the Strong Will Survive	Theophan	Main cast	
2022–present	The Undeclared War	Vadim Trusov	Main cast	
2024	Wolf Hall: The Mirror and the Light	Henry Olisleger	Miniseries	
