= John Lambert (martyr) =

16th century English Protestant martyr

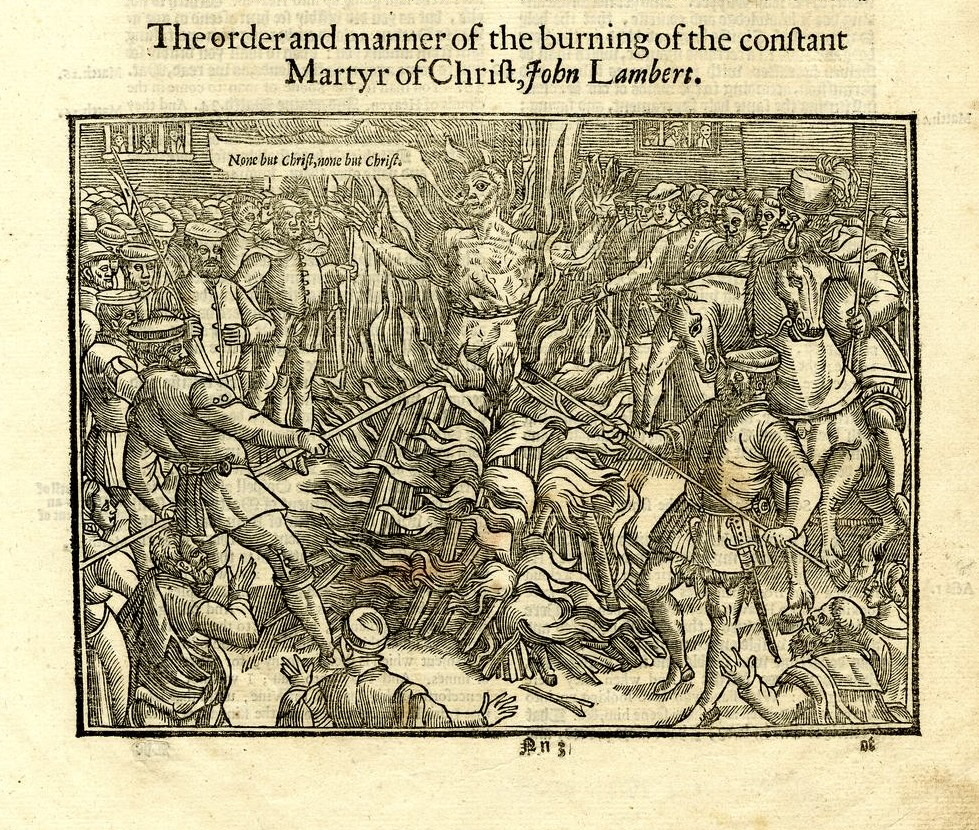
Burning of John Lambert depicted in John Foxe's Acts and Monuments.

John Lambert (died 1538) was an English Protestant martyr burnt to death on 22 November 1538 at Smithfield, London.

== Life ==
Lambert was born John Nicholson in Norwich and educated at Queens' College, Cambridge, where he became a friend and a colleague of Thomas Cromwell. He was made a fellow there on the nomination of Catherine of Aragon. After theological disputes he changed his name and went to Antwerp, where he served as priest to the English factory. Here he became friends with John Frith and William Tyndale, and became a member of the group of humanist theologians that met at the White Horse Tavern—a group that included Edward Fox and Robert Barnes, and the arch-conservative Stephen Gardiner.

Upon his return in 1533, Lambert came under the scrutiny of Archbishop William Warham, but Warham died in 1532. Lambert then earned his living teaching Greek and Latin near the Stock markets. In 1536 he was accused of heresy by the Duke of Norfolk, but escaped until 1538, when he was put on trial for denying the real presence of Christ in the bread and wine of the Eucharist, the doctrine of transubstantiation. Archbishop Thomas Cranmer condemned these views, even though he was later to adopt them himself.

Lambert was eventually burned at the stake. Lambert is well known for his words spoken while the flames leapt from his raised hands: "None but Christ, none but Christ!"

== Portrayals ==
Ben Price portrayed Lambert in season 3 of Showtime's television show The Tudors. Tim Scragg played Lambert in Wolf Hall: The Mirror and the Light.

== See also ==
- Foxe's Book of Martyrs
