= The Last Photograph (2017 film) =

2017 film directed by Danny Huston

- Directed by: Danny Huston
- Written by: Simon Astaire
- Produced by: Simon Astaire; Farah Abushwesha; Julia Rausing
- Starring: Danny Huston; Sarita Choudhury; Stacy Martin; Jonah Hauer-King
- Cinematography: Ed Rutherford
- Edited by: Francisco Forbes
- Music by: Peter Raeburn
- Release date: 22 June 2017 (Edinburgh)
- Running time: 85 minutes
- Country: United Kingdom
- Language: English

The Last Photograph is a 2017 British drama film directed by and starring Danny Huston. Its screenplay was written by Simon Astaire based on his own novel.

== Plot ==
In 2003, Tom Hammond, a middle-aged man, searches for a stolen photograph of his son Luke, which was taken shortly before he was killed in the 1988 bombing of Pan Am Flight 103 on his way to New York City to meet a girl.

== Cast ==
- Danny Huston as Tom Hammond
- Sarita Choudhury as Hannah
- Stacy Martin as Bird
- Jonah Hauer-King as Luke Hammond
- Vincent Regan as Mark
- Michelle Ryan as Maryam
- Jaime Winstone

== Release ==
The film had its world premiere at the Edinburgh International Film Festival in June 2017. For the United States, Freestyle Digital Media acquired the rights to the film and released it theatrically and on video on demand on 6 September 2019.

== Reception ==
On the review aggregator Rotten Tomatoes, the film holds an approval rating of 67% based on 12 reviews, with an average rating of 6.4/10.

Wendy Ide of Screen International wrote that "the story feels a little thin" and that "although the story deals with emotionally wrenching themes, there is a coolness here which keeps us at arm's length". Eddie Harrison of The List gave the film a score of 4 out of 5, writing, "Where 2010's Remember Me used the 9/11 attacks as a punchline, The Last Photograph seeks out where the story hurts the most and sticks with it. The narrative is simple and contrivances are few – this film is about bereavement, short and sharp."
