= Dancing on the Edge (TV series) =

- Cover for the published screenplay
- Genre: Drama
- Created by: Stephen Poliakoff
- Written by: Stephen Poliakoff
- Directed by: Stephen Poliakoff
- Starring: Jacqueline Bisset; Angel Coulby; Chiwetel Ejiofor; Matthew Goode; John Goodman; Anthony Head; Tom Hughes; Janet Montgomery; Wunmi Mosaku; Miles Richardson; Mel Smith; Joanna Vanderham
- Composer: Adrian Johnston
- Country of origin: United Kingdom
- Original language: English

Production
- Executive producer: Colin Callender
- Running time: 360 minutes
- Production companies: Endgame Entertainment; Playground Entertainment

Original release
- Network: BBC Two; BBC HD
- Release: 4 February – 10 March 2013

Related
- Glorious 39

Dancing on the Edge is a British television drama written and directed by Stephen Poliakoff and produced by the BBC about a black jazz band in London in the early 1930s. The series aired on BBC Two between 4 February and 10 March 2013. It was nominated for three awards at the 71st Golden Globe Awards.

== Plot ==
The series follows a black jazz band's experiences in London in the 1930s. Made up of talented musicians and managed by the compassionate yet short-tempered Wesley Holt, the band gets a booking at the Imperial Hotel, through cunning journalist Stanley Mitchell. They prove to be a hit, and become a success at the hotel. Aristocrats — and the Royal Family — ask the band to play at parties. The media rush to interview and photograph the band, who are also associated with the wealthy American businessman Walter Masterson and his enthusiastic British employee Julian. The band's success spirals, with them being offered record deals. But tragedy strikes, setting off a chain of events that may wreck the band's career.

== Cast ==
The Louis Lester Band

- Chiwetel Ejiofor as Louis Lester: The band leader of the Louis Lester Band. Born in London, Louis travelled the world as an entertainer on cruise ships before returning to the UK.
- Angel Coulby as Jessie Taylor: The lead singer with the Louis Lester Band. Beautiful and with an amazing voice, she fascinates even royalty.
- Wunmi Mosaku as Carla: The shy backing vocalist for the Louis Lester Band and Jessie's best friend.
- Ariyon Bakare as Wesley Holt: The irascible manager of the Louis Lester Band. Although born in Cardiff, he has lived in Chicago for most of his life and lost his British birth certificate.

Music Express magazine

- Matthew Goode as Stanley Mitchell: A music journalist at Music Express magazine, who helps bring the band to public attention.
- Jenna Coleman as Rosie Williams: Stanley's assistant at the magazine.
- Sam Hoare as Eric: A new journalist at the magazine.
- Allan Corduner as Mr Wax: The owner of Music Express, who has little to do with the day-to-day operation of the magazine.

The Elite

- Jacqueline Bisset as Lavinia, Lady Cremone: A wealthy aristocrat who has become a recluse after the death of her sons in World War I.
- John Goodman as Walter Masterson: An American real estate mogul and one of the richest men in the world.
- Tom Hughes as Julian Luscombe: A debonair young man, who works as Mr Masterson's aide.
- Joanna Vanderham as Pamela Luscombe: Julian's sister and a playful, beautiful society girl.
- Janet Montgomery as Sarah Peters: A photographer and Pamela's best friend. She is the daughter of a Russian immigrant.
- Anthony Head as Arthur Donaldson: A wealthy and influential businessman.
- John Hopkins as Prince George, Duke of Kent: Son of the King George V.

Non-elite

- Mel Smith as Nathan Schlesinger: The manager of the Imperial Hotel.
- Miles Richardson as Harry Thornton: Mr Schlesinger's right-hand man at the Imperial.
- Maggie McCarthy as Mrs Mitchell: Stanley's mother.
- Caroline Quentin as Deirdre: The owner of a small music club.
- David Dawson as D.I. Horton: A police detective investigating a murder.
- Gerard Horan as D.I. Gunson: A police detective investigating a murder.

== Episodes ==
| No. | Title | Directed by | Written by | Original release date | U.K. viewers (millions) |
|---|---|---|---|---|---|
| 1 | "Episode 1" | Stephen Poliakoff | Stephen Poliakoff | 4 February 2013 | 3.00 |
Music journalist Stanley Mitchell befriends the Louis Lester Band and helps its rise to fame from playing in a basement jazz club to the illustrious Imperial Hotel. At first, the band is treated with hostility by the hotel's elderly audience, most of whom have never heard jazz music nor seen black musicians before. However, one table of young people love their new music and invite them to play at a garden party.
| 2 | "Episode 2" | Stephen Poliakoff | Stephen Poliakoff | 5 February 2013 | 2.48 |
The Louis Lester Band has yet to reach the fame Louis believes it deserves, even having to play for children's birthday parties as part of its booking at the Imperial Hotel. Louis is frustrated. However, the band is introduced to wealthy recluse Lady Cremone and she may be able to change its fortunes.
| 3 | "Episode 3" | Stephen Poliakoff | Stephen Poliakoff | 11 February 2013 | 2.35 |
The band and their friends are devastated by Jessie's hospitalisation, and take turns to visit her. Louis is interviewed by police about events on the night of Jessie's attack, and he tells them that he saw Julian at the Imperial Hotel at a time after Julian was meant to have been on a train to Paris. The band have to be persuaded to play without Jessie for the Imperial Hotel's Christmas Day lunch, and they are unsettled when a group of racist Germans walk out during the performance. But the mood is lifted when news arrives that Jessie has woken from her coma. For New Year's Eve, Lady Cremone holds a party on her estate. Everybody is surprised when Julian turns up, announcing he has been in France exploring a new business idea. The group goes into the village to celebrate the New Year, and there is a joyous and romantic mood. In the middle of the party, Louis confides to Sarah that he saw Julian at the hotel the night of Jessie's attack. Stanley exacts revenge on the Germans by smuggling in Louis to play at a German Embassy party. The prank goes brilliantly, but the friends' joy soon turns to tears when tragedy strikes.
| 4 | "Episode 4" | Stephen Poliakoff | Stephen Poliakoff | 18 February 2013 | 2.52 |
The Band plays for the Freemasons dinner and Louis notices the close ties between Julian, whom he believes to be the killer, and a powerful elite. Everyone is shocked by events in the United States where an attempt has been made on the President's life. Masterson reveals his plan to build a news empire around the Music Express Magazine. Stanley warns Louis that the police believe him to be the killer; he tries to see a lawyer, but others seem to be conspiring to hand him over to the police.
| 5 | "Episode 5" | Stephen Poliakoff | Stephen Poliakoff | 25 February 2013 | 2.61 |
Louis can no longer hide out at the Music Express Office so Stanley takes him to a suburban flat to escape the manhunt. He is to wait until nightfall, whilst Stanley goes to find his passport as they plan his escape out of the country. Stanley returns to the Imperial Hotel, to find that its reputation has been badly affected by the murder there. Masterson takes over the Music Express magazine, and surprises Stanley by announcing he has offered a large reward for the capture of Louis Lester.
| 6 | "Interviewing Louis" | Stephen Poliakoff | Stephen Poliakoff | 10 March 2013 | 0.39 (overnight) |
Presented as a series of interviews undertaken by Stanley for his Music Express magazine and taking place at the peak of fame for the Louis Lester band, Louis, Jessie and Carla give an insight into their thoughts about fame as well as their personal stories. Louis and Stanley remember the First World War, in which Louis's father fought. Louis talks about what it is like to be a black musician in London, and they discuss the band's exotic attraction to the aristocracy. Stanley talks to Carla and Jessie, who open up about their upbringings and their feelings on becoming famous. And Louis describes a chilling story about a female fan, when what started as a prank phone call became something much more sinister.

== Locations ==
Filming took place on location at the Grand Hotel and Council House in Birmingham, where the hotel scenes were shot, the Black Country Living Museum was used to shoot a scene set in a mining village and Ragley Hall in Warwickshire was used as Lady Cremone's home. The headquarters of Music Express are located at No. 4 Princelet Street, Spitalfields and later at Somerset House. The railway scenes in the first episode were shot on the preserved Bluebell Railway. Wilton's Music Hall was used as the club. Fenton House, Hampstead, stands for the house of Donaldson. Some scenes for Donaldson's house were also shot at Upton House, Warwickshire. Kidderminster, on the Severn Valley Railway, was used as "Folkestone" in the fifth episode. Manze's Eel, Pie and Mash shop in Walthamstow also makes an appearance in that episode.

== Reception ==
=== Critical response ===
On the review aggregator website Rotten Tomatoes, 63% of 19 critics' reviews are positive. Metacritic, which uses a weighted average, assigned the film a score of 65 out of 100, based on 14 critics, indicating "generally favorable" reviews.

=== Accolades ===
| Award | Category | Nominee(s) | Result |
|---|---|---|---|
| Satellite Awards | Best Miniseries or Television Film | Dancing on the Edge | Won |
| Satellite Awards | Best Actor – Miniseries or Television Film | Matthew Goode | Nominated |
| Satellite Awards | Best Actor – Miniseries or Television Film | Chiwetel Ejiofor | Nominated |
| Golden Globe Awards | Best Miniseries or Television Film | Dancing on the Edge | Nominated |
| Golden Globe Awards | Best Actor – Miniseries or Television Film | Chiwetel Ejiofor | Nominated |
| Golden Globe Awards | Best Supporting Actress – Series, Miniseries, or Television Film | Jacqueline Bisset | Won |
| Primetime Emmy Awards | Outstanding Lead Actor in a Limited Series or Movie | Chiwetel Ejiofor | Nominated |
| Black Reel Award | Outstanding Actor, TV Movie or Mini-Series | Chiwetel Ejiofor | Won |
| Broadcasting Press Guild Award | Best Actor | Chiwetel Ejiofor | Won |
| Image Award | Outstanding Actor in a Television Movie, Mini-Series, or Dramatic Special | Chiwetel Ejiofor | Nominated |
| Royal Television Society Craft & Design Awards | Costume Design - Drama | Lindsay Pugh | Nominated |
| BAFTA TV Awards | Television Craft | Sound – Fiction in 2014 | Adrian Bell | Won |
