= Pilar Ordovas =

Art gallery owner

Pilar Ordovas is an art gallery owner who founded her gallery in 2011. She exhibits and deals in 20th-century and contemporary art, presenting a programme of museum-quality shows in London and in New York City.

== Career ==
Ordovas presents three exhibitions each year in a 2,000-square-foot gallery space, located in London at 25 Savile Row, designed by Thomas Croft Architects.

In 2015, the gallery inaugurated its overseas presence with a large-scale sculpture exhibition of works by Spanish artist Eduardo Chillida in a double-level, 10,000-square-foot space on the corner of Madison Avenue and East 52nd Street in New York City. Ordovas has staged two further exhibitions in New York City in the years since and her gallery has a permanent office located in the city.

=== Museums and institutions ===
From the inception of her gallery, Ordovas has worked closely with museums and institutions. The inaugural exhibition, Irrational Marks: Bacon and Rembrandt, presented self-portraits by Francis Bacon alongside Rembrandt's small Self-Portrait with Beret, which was a loan from the Musée Granet (Aix-en-Provence, France) and a painting that fascinated Bacon.

Painting from Life: Carracci Freud, autumn 2012, was curated in collaboration with Dr. Xavier Bray, then chief curator of the Dulwich Picture Gallery, and included the loan of a painting by Annibale Carracci from the Dulwich's collection.

In 2013, together with the Rijksmuseum (Amsterdam), Ordovas staged Raw Truth: Auerbach – Rembrandt, a joint exhibition centred around paintings and etchings by Rembrandt loaned by the Rijksmuseum in conversation with paintings by Frank Auerbach. After its display at Ordovas, London, in autumn 2013, this show went on public display at the Rijksmuseum.

Ordovas has also collaborated with PinchukArtCentre (Kiev, Ukraine), the Isamu Noguchi Foundation and Garden Museum (New York City), the Wadsworth Atheneum Museum of Art (Hartford, Connecticutl, and the Astrup Fearnley Museum of Modern Art (Oslo, Norway).

=== Artists' estates ===
Ordovas has staged a number of exhibitions in collaboration with artists' estates. Calder in India brought together for public display for the first time nine works that Alexander Calder made in India in 1955.

In 2014, Ordovas presented an exhibition entitled Chillida on Miró, organized in collaboration with the families of the two artists, Eduardo Chillida and Joan Miró.

For Giacometti Smith, in spring 2016, Ordovas worked closely with the Alberto and Annette Giacometti Foundation and David Smith estate. Ordovas has also organised a number of exhibitions in collaboration with the estates of Francis Bacon and Lucian Freud, including the gallery's inaugural exhibition, Irrational Marks: Bacon and Rembrandt (autumn 2011), Girl – Lucian Freud (summer 2015), Self (autumn 2014), Movement and Gravity: Bacon and Rodin in Dialogue (spring 2013), The Big Blue (autumn 2015) and London Painters (November 2017 – January 2018, New York City; February – April 2018, London).

Ordovas expanded to the United States in 2015. Her inaugural exhibition in New York City was a collaboration with the Chillida estate. Chillida: Rhythm–Time–Silence featured works rendered in corten steel, granite and alabaster from San Sebastián, Spain, where the artist lived and worked. This was the first major exhibition of the artist's work on U.S. soil in twenty-five years and introduced a new generation of art lovers and collectors to Chillida's work Following New York City, the exhibition travelled to the Nelson-Atkins Museum of Art in Kansas City, Missouri (May–December 2017), where seven works by Chillida were presented in the museum's sculpture park, among sculptures by Alexander Calder, Henry Moore and Claes Oldenburg.

== Personal ==
Ordovas married Simon Astaire in 2018, with whom she has a daughter Paloma.

== See also ==
- List of art dealers
- List of people from London
- List of people from New York
