= Little Women (2017 TV series) =

2017 British TV series

- Genre: Historical drama
- Based on: Little Women by Louisa May Alcott
- Written by: Heidi Thomas
- Directed by: Vanessa Caswill
- Starring: Emily Watson; Maya Hawke; Willa Fitzgerald; Annes Elwy; Kathryn Newton
- Music by: Stuart Earl; Rebecca Dale; Andrew Bird
- Country of origin: United Kingdom
- Original language: English
- No. of series: 1
- No. of episodes: 3

Production
- Producer: Colin Callender
- Cinematography: Piers McGrail
- Editors: Matthew Tabern; Hazel Baillie
- Running time: 57 minutes per episode
- Production company: Playground Entertainment

Original release
- Network: BBC One; PBS Masterpiece
- Release: 26 December – 28 December 2017

Little Women is a British 2017 three-part BBC television historical drama based on the novel by Louisa May Alcott. Adapted by Heidi Thomas, the adaptation was directed by Vanessa Caswill, which first broadcast on BBC One on Boxing Day 2017 and the following two days. The cast includes Emily Watson, Michael Gambon and Angela Lansbury. Production was supported by PBS and the series was shown as part of its Masterpiece anthology.

== Cast ==
- Emily Watson: Marmee March
- Maya Hawke: Jo March
- Willa Fitzgerald: Meg March
- Kathryn Newton: Amy March
- Annes Elwy: Beth March
- Jonah Hauer-King: Theodore 'Laurie' Laurence
- Julian Morris: John Brooke
- Dylan Baker: Mr March
- Michael Gambon: Mr Laurence
- Angela Lansbury: Aunt March
- Patrick Flannery: Soldier
- Fode Simbo: Bandaged Young Man
- Eleanor Methven: Hannah
- Nelly Henrion: Estelle
- Felix Mackenzie-Barrow: Frank Vaughn
- Mei Bignall: Kate Vaughn
- Richard Pepple: Hairdresser
- Kathleen Warner Yeates: Aunt Carroll
- Mark Stanley: Professor Bhaer
- Ann Skelly: Annie Moffat

== Production ==
Little Women was commissioned by BBC Drama in May 2017, along with 10 other television dramas. The three-part series was adapted by Heidi Thomas, who created Call the Midwife, and directed by Vanessa Caswill. It was produced by Playground Television UK with PBS Masterpiece.

Little Women is set in Concord, Massachusetts, but was filmed in County Wicklow, Ireland. Filming took place in the coastal town of Bray and at the Ardmore Studios from July 2017.

Irish costume designer Eimer Ní Mhaoldomhnaigh created the clothing for the miniseries.

== Episodes ==
No.	Title	Directed by	Written by	Original release date	US airdate
1	"Part 1"	Vanessa Caswill	Heidi Thomas	26 December 2017	13 May 2018
The four March sisters, Meg, Jo, Beth and Amy, are growing up during the American Civil War in Concord, Massachusetts while their father, a pastor, is off at battle. Their mother, Marmee, tries to keep up their charitable works while their father is away and on Christmas, finding a poor German family, she convinces her daughters to give up their Christmas meal. On the way there Jo meets Theodore "Laurie" Laurence, her next door neighbour's grandson, who has recently lost his mother. He tells his grandfather what the girls have done, and Mr Laurence provides them with Christmas dinner. The two older sisters work: Meg as a governess, and Jo as a companion for her rich Aunt March, though she also harbours ambitions of being a published writer. Younger sister Beth has abandoned her education to work as a homemaker while the youngest, Amy, is still in school. Despite their varying occupations they continue to befriend Laurie and the Laurence family with Laurie's tutor, Brooke, taking particular interest in Meg to Jo's distress. Marmee receives a telegram informing her that her husband is gravely ill but cannot afford a train ticket to Washington to go to him. Marmee successfully begs Aunt March for the money to go to her husband, but unaware of the situation Jo has already gone to a dressmaker and sold off her hair to him for the price of the fare. Marmee leaves for Washington, and a resolute Jo determines to be brave now that she and her sisters must run the household alone.
2	"Part 2"	Vanessa Caswill	Heidi Thomas	27 December 2017	20 May 2018
With Marmee away, the girls try to muddle forward alone. Amy gets in trouble at school and is whipped, causing her to leave school. Meg attends her first ball and is troubled to find her friends believe that she and her mother have designs on Laurie. While trying to look after the Hummels (the poor German family), Beth contracts scarlet fever. Amy is sent to Aunt March's while Meg and Jo look after Beth. Despite their stubbornness in trying not to ask Marmee to come home, Laurie goes behind Jo's back and sends Marmee a telegram asking her home which she is ultimately grateful for. He also kisses Jo, but she rejects him, asking him to remain her friend. By Christmas Beth has recovered, Jo has a story accepted by a publisher, and the girls' father returns from the war, weak but healed. Jo tells Marmee that Brooke is in love with Meg and is surprised to find that not only does Marmee know it, but she hopes that Meg will return his love. Brooke enlists in the army and before he goes he proposes to Meg, who turns him down. However, once Aunt March expresses her disdain for Brooke, Meg has a reversal of opinion and realises she does love Brooke after all. He goes to war, returns, and they marry. At their wedding, Aunt March reconciles with Meg. Meanwhile Jo receives an offer to publish her book for $300 and is angered when her father suggests she turn it down. At Meg and Brooke's wedding Laurie once again suggests that he might be attracted to Jo, but she turns him away by saying that she is determined to be an old maid.
3	"Part 3"	Vanessa Caswill	Heidi Thomas	28 December 2017	20 May 2018
A year after Meg's marriage Meg is pregnant with twins, Jo finds herself hit with writer's block after her novel failed, Beth is continuing to struggle with her health, and Amy is invited to join her Aunt Carroll and her cousin on a tour of Europe, to Jo's jealousy. Frustrated by her stagnant life and aware that Laurie continues to harbour romantic feelings towards her, Jo leaves to work as a governess at a boarding house in New York. While there she meets a German professor, Mr Bhaer, and begins writing again. Jo develops a deep friendship with Professor Bhaer but returns home in order to take Beth to the ocean. At home Laurie once again makes his feelings for Jo clear and she finally tells him once and for all that she doesn't love him. Mr Lawrence succeeds in persuading him to travel to Europe in order to try to forget about Jo. While there he runs into Amy and they renew their friendship. At home Beth admits she is gravely ill and dies. In order to work through her grief Jo begins to write serious poetry which is well received. In Europe Amy and Laurie learn of Beth's death and grow closer, eventually falling in love and marrying before returning home. Jo feels frustrated by her quiet and confined life and confesses so to Aunt March while she is nursing her back to health after a stroke. On her way home she meets Professor Bhaer who has come to see her and she introduces him to her approving family. Years later Jo has married Bhaer and helps him run the Bhaer school for Boys, located in Plumfield, Aunt March's home which she left to Jo after she died. The family reunites on the property for a picnic. Meg remarks that things in life can never be perfect, but Jo replies that things can be just right which Marmee agrees to.

== Reception ==
The UK media reception for the programme was very positive. Little Women has an approval rating of 82% on review aggregator website Rotten Tomatoes, based on 38 reviews, and an average rating of 7.6/10. The website's critical consensus states: "Heidi Thomas' Little Women miniseries offers a charming, intimate, and decidedly loyal adaptation of Louisa May Alcott's original story." Euan Ferguson in The Observer said: "The grit and pain of the girls' struggles to define themselves, in that fast-changing age, in that still young country, rang wholly fresh and credible... all in all, a triumph". Ben Lawrence of The Daily Telegraph described it as: "the single best thing on television over Christmas... a delight from start to finish – a poignant, funny version of Louisa May Alcott's 1869 novel which made the four March sisters seem like both exciting new creations and old friends", while Alex O'Connell in The Times said: "writer Heidi Thomas (Call the Midwife, Cranford) reminds us why we love it and shows us the classic in a bright new light". Mike Hale of The New York Times had a more negative review saying that: "What we get is a fairly faithful rendition of the book's events that lacks the warmth and depth of feeling that make the book worth reading." Ben Allen of the Radio Times felt the online reception amongst the public to be more mixed, with some viewers preferring the interpretation of earlier filmed adaptations, while others were left moved but conflicted by the accurate depiction of the novel's conclusion. Episode one was seen by 5.17 million viewers and episode three by 4.38 million according to BARB's consolidated viewing data; whereas episode two was watched by fewer than 4.31 million viewers and thus did not feature in BBC1's top 30 most viewed programmes for week ending 31 December 2017.
