= This Is the Night (2021 film) =

American drama film

- Official poster
- Directed by: James DeMonaco
- Written by: James DeMonaco
- Produced by: Jason Blum; Sebastien K. Lemercier
- Starring: Frank Grillo; Lucius Hoyos; Jonah Hauer-King; Bobby Cannavale; Naomi Watts
- Cinematography: Anastas Michos
- Edited by: Keith Fraase
- Music by: Nathan Whitehead
- Production companies: Blumhouse Productions; Man in a Tree Productions
- Distributed by: Universal Pictures
- Release date: September 17, 2021
- Running time: 108 minutes
- Country: United States
- Language: English

This Is the Night is a 2021 American drama film written and directed by James DeMonaco. It stars Frank Grillo, Lucius Hoyos, Jonah Hauer-King, Bobby Cannavale, and Naomi Watts. Jason Blum served as producer under his Blumhouse Productions banner and Sebastien Lemercier served as producer under his Man in a Tree Productions banner.

The film was released at the Angelika Film Center for a limited run on September 17, 2021, and was digitally released on September 21, 2021, by Universal Pictures. It was largely panned by critics.

== Plot ==
In 1982, a family must confront its greatest challenges and the family realizes that the only way to live is like there's no tomorrow.

== Cast ==
- Frank Grillo as Vincent Dedea
- Lucius Hoyos as Anthony Dedea
- River Alexander as Dov Sabian
- Jonah Hauer-King as Christian Dedea
- Bobby Cannavale as Frank Larocca
- Naomi Watts as Marie Dedea
- Cliff "Method Man" Smith as Louis
- Constantine Rousouli as Rafe the Handsome Mailman
- Lenny Venito as Carmine Cacioppo
- Madelyn Cline as Sophia Larocca
- Chase Vacnin as Albie Lenexa
- Adam Cantor as Tall Sal Barbero
- Steve Lipman as Santo Saggese

In addition, Frankie Montero plays gang leader Gus Giammarino, a brief but pivotal role.

== Production ==
On May 15, 2018, Blumhouse Productions and Man in a Tree Productions announced James DeMonaco would be writing and directing a drama film titled Once Upon a Time in Staten Island, with Naomi Watts, Frank Grillo and Bobby Cannavale starring in the film. On August 4, 2020, it was announced the film was re-titled This Is the Night.

Principal photography began on May 30, 2018.

== Release ==
The film had a one-week theatrical run at the Angelika Film Center on September 17, 2021, and was digitally released on September 21, 2021, by Universal Pictures.

== Reception ==
=== Critical response ===
On the review aggregator website Rotten Tomatoes, 13% of 8 critics' reviews are positive, with an average rating of 3.3/10.
