= Simon Astaire =

British writer

- Born: Simon Jack Astaire; 3 June 1961 (age 65); London, United Kingdom
- Occupations: novelist, screenwriter, media advisor
- Years active: 1980–present
- Spouse: Pilar Ordovas (m. 2018)
- Children: 2

Simon Jack Astaire (born 3 June 1961) is a British media advisor, novelist, screenwriter, film producer.

== Early life ==
Astaire was born at the Lindo Wing at St Mary's Hospital, London, is the son of stockbroker Edgar Astaire and his former wife, interior designer Lesley, who was subsequently the first wife of artist Bill Jacklin. He was educated at Wellesley House School in Kent, and at Harrow School. His uncle was the boxing promoter Jarvis Astaire.

== Career ==
Astaire was recruited by the talent agency International Creative Management (ICM) UK, where he became the youngest agent yet to be employed by the firm. During his ten-year career as head of young artists (clients included Oscar Winner Rachel Weisz) and international signings at ICM, Simon established a thriving music department.

In 1997 he became Chief Executive of Protocol Multimedia with diverse media divisions that included personal representation, product and celebrity endorsement and PR, working with companies such as Bvlgari, Giorgio Armani, Calvin Klein, Alfred Dunhill and Saatchi & Saatchi. Charlize Theron was contracted to Bvlgari as Lady Helen Taylor was to Armani and Calvin Klein. Astaire negotiated an unprecedented deal between writer Fay Weldon and Bvlgari; she was commissioned to write a novel, The Bvlgari Connection was the first commission of its kind.

Among Astaire's clients are members of the Hollywood establishment and the British royal family, including Prince and Princess Michael of Kent.

Astaire appears as a pundit regularly on CNN, Sky News, Five and other networks commenting upon all critical media and celebrity stories.

=== Publications ===
His first novel, Private Privilege, was published in 2008 by Quartet Books. The story is a rite of passage through the eyes of a public schoolboy. The sequel And You Are? was published the following year. It is set in Hollywood, Las Vegas and London. His third novel, Mr Coles, was published in May 2011. It takes place in an English Prep School and follows the tortured life of one of its masters. It was described in one review as "illuminating the dark alleys of the human condition". His fourth novel, The Last Photograph, is set on 21 December 1988; the day Pan Am Flight 103 crashed into Lockerbie. It was Hello Magazine's book of the week, and the review described it as being 'emotionally eloquent and a searing study of loss and love.' His first authorised biography is of soccer star Sol Campbell. It was published in March 2014 and was serialised in The Sunday Times. The biography became The Times critic's choice of the week. Astaire was nominated as the best 'new' writer at The Best Sports Book Awards of the Year 2015.

In September 2018, a regular feature called Station to Station began in The Sunday Telegraph. Astaire's concept is asking his guests 12 questions while taking an imaginary train journey. His first guest was Ian Holm, and his journey choice was Paris to Antibes. It was to be Ian Holm's last interview. The podcast station2station is based on the idea and was published in March 2024. His opening shows featured Sol Campbell, the lyricist Nicky Chinn and Columbian artist Antonio Suarez Londonio. The second series of 8 episodes was released in August 2024.

His daily blog 'Letters to My Daughter' began in March 2020 through World Press.

In 2021, Astaire and the British artist Bill Jacklin collaborated to create Cressida's Dream. The story of a father and daughter mixed with the cautionary tale of a world on the edge of apocalypse. The novella was published in December 2021.

== Film ==
Astaire co-produced the movie The Last Photograph based on his novel of the same title. He also wrote the screenplay. The film was shot in Central London and Lockerbie, Scotland. It is directed by Danny Huston and stars Danny Huston, Sarita Choudhury, Stacy Martin. The world premiere was at the Edinburgh Film Festival in June 2017. It was shortlisted for The Michael Powell Award for Best British Feature Film. Its first US screening was at the Mill Valley Film Festival in October 2107. The film was released at selected United States theatres on 6 September 2019 and is available on all major platforms. The critic Joan Lowerison wrote," "Simon Astaire's brilliantly-written script offers sudden time shifts, black-and-white and colour shots, even some blurry shots, and sudden unnerving emotional outbursts illustrating Tom's interior struggle." The film got its UK release in April 2021.

== Personal life ==
Astaire has a son, Milo, with his former partner, model Saffron Aldridge and a daughter, Paloma, with gallerist Pilar Ordovas. They married in New York City in 2018.
