= Howards End (TV series) =

2017 British-American television drama

- Genre: Drama
- Based on: Howards End by E. M. Forster
- Written by: Kenneth Lonergan
- Directed by: Hettie Macdonald
- Starring: Hayley Atwell; Matthew Macfadyen; Philippa Coulthard; Joseph Quinn; Joe Bannister; Rosalind Eleazar; Alex Lawther; Bessie Carter; Jonah Hauer-King; Tracey Ullman; Julia Ormond
- Composer: Nico Muhly
- Countries of origin: United Kingdom; United States
- Original language: English
- No. of episodes: 4

Production
- Executive producers: Sophie Gardiner; Scott Huff; Joshua D. Maurer; Alixandre Witlin; David A. Stern; Colin Callender
- Producer: Laura Hastings-Smith
- Cinematography: Wojciech Szepel
- Running time: 56–58 minutes
- Production companies: Playground Entertainment; City Entertainment; KippSter Entertainment

Original release
- Network: BBC One
- Release: 12 November – 3 December 2017
- Network: Starz
- Release: 8 April – 29 April 2018

Howards End is a drama miniseries based on the 1910 novel of the same name by E. M. Forster. The series was adapted by Kenneth Lonergan, directed by Hettie Macdonald, and stars Hayley Atwell. The 4-part series, a co-production between BBC One and Starz, premiered on 12 November 2017 in the UK and 8 April 2018 in the US.

== Premise ==
Howards End examines "the changing landscape of social and class divisions in turn of the century England through the prism of 3 families: the intellectual and idealistic Schlegels, the wealthy Wilcoxes from the world of business, and the working-class Basts."

== Cast and characters ==
=== Main ===
- Hayley Atwell as Margaret Schlegel
- Matthew Macfadyen as Henry Wilcox
- Philippa Coulthard as Helen Schlegel
- Joseph Quinn as Leonard Bast
- Joe Bannister as Charles Wilcox
- Rosalind Eleazar as Jacky Bast
- Alex Lawther as Tibby Schlegel
- Bessie Carter as Evie Wilcox
- Jonah Hauer-King as Paul Wilcox
- Tracey Ullman as Aunt Juley Mund
- Julia Ormond as Ruth Wilcox

=== Recurring ===
- Donna Banya as Annie
- Yolanda Kettle as Dolly Wilcox
- Sandra Voe as Miss Avery
- Gavin Brocker as Crane
- Miles Jupp as Percy Cahill
- William Belchambers as Burton
- Hannah Traylen as Nancy

=== Guest ===
- Leonie Benesch as Frieda Mosenbach

== Production ==
On 28 November 2012 it was announced that Playground Entertainment, in association with City Entertainment and KippSter Entertainment, had acquired the screen rights to E.M. Forster's novel Howards End with the intention of adapting it into a television drama for BBC Two. Executive producers for the production were set to include Colin Callender, Joshua D. Maurer, Alixandre Witlin, and David A. Stern. On 11 October 2013 it was announced that Kenneth Lonergan had been chosen to adapt the novel. The production had yet to be greenlit by the BBC but it was reportedly expected to consist of four episodes. It was additionally announced that Polly Hill would be executive producing for the BBC. On 28 December 2015 it was announced that BBC One had officially greenlit the production. On 7 June 2016 it was announced that Hettie MacDonald would direct all four episodes of the serial. On 15 February 2017 it was announced that Starz was joining the production as a co-producer.

Alongside the announcement that Starz was joining the production, it was confirmed that Hayley Atwell, Matthew Macfadyen, and Tracey Ullman would star in the series. A few days later, it was announced that Julia Ormond, Philippa Coulthard, Joseph Quinn, Rosalind Eleazar, and Alex Lawther had also joined the main cast.

Principal photography for the drama began during the summer of 2016. The house used for Howards End is Vann House, near Hambledon; dating from 1542 but remodelled by WD Caröe after 1907 with gardens designed by Gertrude Jekyll. Scenes were filmed at Waverley Abbey, West Wycombe Park, Ballard Down, Swanage Pier and Harry Warren House on Studland Bay. London locations included Myddelton Square in Clerkenwell, Great Russell Street, Chancery Lane, the British Museum, Australia House and Simpsons in the Strand.

== Episodes ==
No.	Title	Directed by	Written by	Original release date	US release date	UK viewers (millions)	US viewers (millions)
1	"Episode 1"	Hettie Macdonald	Kenneth Lonergan	12 November 2017	8 April 2018	8.30	0.217
After meeting the Wilcoxes on the Continent, Helen Schlegel visits them at Howards End. There, an unfortunate engagement between Helen and Paul Wilcox is quickly ended. The wealthy Wilcoxes decide that the Schlegels—Helen, her older sister Margaret, and brother Tibby—are of the unreliable, idealistic sort. The Schlegels meet and become interested in Leonard Bast, a lower class clerk. While the rest of the Wilcox family are away, Margaret and Mrs. Wilcox meet and become close friends.
2	"Episode 2"	Hettie Macdonald	Kenneth Lonergan	19 November 2017	15 April 2018	5.68	0.276
Mrs. Wilcox dies. After the funeral, the family discovers that Mrs. Wilcox, knowing the Schlegels must soon leave their home, has written a note bequeathing Howards End to Margaret. Henry Wilcox assumes his wife was not of sound mind and the children believe that the Schlegels maneuvered to obtain an inheritance. They destroy the note. Helen becomes more interested in helping Leonard Bast. Mr. Wilcox becomes interested in Margaret and she in him.
3	"Episode 3"	Hettie Macdonald	Kenneth Lonergan	26 November 2017	22 April 2018	5.42	0.207
Henry and Margaret plan their wedding to the dismay of the Wilcox children, especially the eldest son, Charles. Helen dislikes Henry and his business activities and strongly disapproves of the wedding. Based on advice Henry gave to Margaret and Helen, Leonard has left his job and then loses his new job. He and his wife are now destitute, something Helen strives to rectify.
4	"Episode 4"	Hettie Macdonald	Kenneth Lonergan	3 December 2017	29 April 2018	5.06	0.275
Helen has mysteriously left for Germany and for months avoids contact with Margaret. She returns because their aunt's illness and the mystery of her departure is revealed. A confrontation at Howards End with Leonard, Henry's son Charles, and the Schlegel sisters ends in tragedy. Margaret nobly resolves the ensuing conflict.

== Release ==
On 4 May 2017 the first image from the series was released. On 7 December 2017 Starz released the first trailer for American audiences. On 1 November 2017 the series held its official British premiere in London at the BFI Southbank. On 4 April 2018 the series held its official American premiere in New York City at the Whitby Hotel. Howards End was broadcast on BBC One in the United Kingdom, ABC TV in Australia and Starz in the United States. The series premiered in the United States on 8 April 2018 on Starz.

The series was met with a positive response from critics. On the review aggregation website Rotten Tomatoes, the series holds an 88% approval rating with an average rating of 7.73 out of 10 based on 34 reviews. The website's critical consensus reads, "Hayley Atwell shines in Howards End, a beautiful, if borderline superficial, adaptation of a much-revered book." Metacritic, which uses a weighted average, assigned the season a score of 86 out of 100 based on 15 critics, indicating "universal acclaim".
