= Queens: The Virgin and the Martyr =

- Film poster for the English version
- No. of episodes: 6

Original release
- Network: Televisión Española; BBC
- Release: 24 January 2017 – February 28, 2017

Queens: The Virgin and the Martyr (In Spanish: Reinas) is a Spanish and British historical drama television series created by José Luis Moreno, and produced by Televisión Española with a Spanish and British cast. Production of the series had many irregularities, such as the producer falsely claiming it was coproduced by BBC.

== Cast ==
- Olivia Chenery as Mary Stuart
- Rebecca Scott as Elizabeth I of England
- Tom Christian as Robert Dudley
- Harry Jarvis as Lord Darnley
- Adrián Castiñeiras as Philip II of Spain
- Fernando Gil as Grand Duke of Alba
- Laura Ledesma as Isabel de Valois
- Carlos Camino as David Rizzio
- Nick Cornwall as John Dee
- Leo Hatton as Lady Ann
- Landher Iturbe as Carlos, Prince of Asturias
- Steve Howard as Pope Pius V
- Alejandra Onieva as lady in waiting Ana of Austria
- Paloma Bloyd as Joanna of Austria
- Cerith Flinn as Francis Throckmorton

== Episodes ==
No.	Title	Directed by	Original release date	Viewers (share)
1	"El regreso" "Return"	José Luis Moreno and Manuel Carballo	1 January 2017	1,947,000 (11.0%)
2	"El matrimonio, razón de estado" "Marriage, reason of state"	José Luis Moreno and Manuel Carballo	31 January 2017	1,271,000 (7.4%)
3	"Conspiración" "Conspiracy"	José Luis Moreno and Manuel Carballo	7 February 2017	1,228,000 (7.2%)
4	"Venganza. El informe Rosso" "Revenge. The informed Rosso"	José Luis Moreno and Manuel Carballo	14 February 2017	1,098,000 (6.5%)
5	"La abdicación" "Abdication"	José Luis Moreno and Manuel Carballo	21 February 2017	1,097,000 (6.3%)
6	"La decapitación" "Decapitation"	José Luis Moreno and Manuel Carballo	28 February 2017	973,000 (6.2%)

== Reception ==
The series has been criticised for having low quality production values, in spite of its budget of around €2 million per episode. Another cause of controversy was that the series was filmed in English and then dubbed into Spanish. Finally, there were irregularities with the credits, with some scriptwriters who were named on the script for the pilot episode do not feature on the show's credits, or have a page on IMDb.
