= The Undeclared War =

British TV series (2022–present)

- Genre: Thriller
- Created by: Peter Kosminsky; Colin Callender
- Starring: Hannah Khalique-Brown; Simon Pegg; Maisie Richardson-Sellers; Edward Holcroft; Adrian Lester; Alex Jennings; Mark Rylance; Alfie Friedman; Kerry Godliman; German Segal; Joss Porter; Tinatin Dalakishvili; Tom McKay; Ed Stoppard; Siân Brooke; Danny Sapani; Chloe Pirrie; Jason Tobin; Gavin Spokes
- Theme music composer: Debbie Wiseman Craig Armstrong
- Composers: Debbie Wiseman (Season 1, 2022); Craig Armstrong (Season 2, 2026)
- Country of origin: United Kingdom
- Original languages: English; Russian
- No. of series: 2
- No. of episodes: 12

Production
- Executive producers: Peter Kosminsky; Colin Callender; Noëlette Buckley; Daniel Gratton; Colin Teevan; Paul McGuigan
- Producers: Robert Jones; Caroline Levy
- Cinematography: Gavin Finney
- Editor: David Blackmore
- Production companies: Playground Entertainment; Stonehenge Films; Universal International Studios

Original release
- Network: Channel 4 (United Kingdom)
- Release: 30 June 2022 – present
- Network: Peacock (United States)
- Release: 18 August 2022 – present

The Undeclared War is a British near-future thriller television series for Channel 4 and Peacock. The series is created by Peter Kosminsky and Colin Callender. It follows two main characters, Saara Parvin in the UK and Vadim Trusov in Russia, during a cyber and misinformation attack upon the UK. In the United Kingdom, the first series aired from 30 June 2022. Channel 4 announced on 12 February 2025 that a second series consisting of six episodes would be produced, which premiered on 21 July 2026.

== Plot ==
Parvin has just started a one-year student-placement at GCHQ when a cyber-attack takes down some of the UK Internet and she joins the team examining the code of the malware. She is praised when she discovers a second attack within the code and a diligent search for a third attack doesn't find one.

Meanwhile, she feels alienated within GCHQ but makes friends with John Yeabsley, who spends his lunch-time correcting the grammar of other people's blogs. He, in turn, says how alienating it is to not be able to talk about his work outside. It is later shown that Parvin has not told her family where she is working and her brother is appalled when she finally tells him.

Trusov had attended a class with Parvin in London and when he returns to Russia he starts working for Russia's Twitter-misinformation campaign, but when the UK crash the facility as reprisal for the malware he reluctantly joins the offensive malware department.

Russia escalates the attack and incites unrest in the UK by interfering with the reporting of a general election, whereupon the UK remotely cyber attacks some Russian arms companies. Russia exaggerate the damage and uses it as a pretext for isolating GCHQ from the NSA by leaking NSA software from a UK site.

Trusov eventually reveals that this was all planned by Russia and he deliberately and openly leaks all the Russian software to GCHQ as a gift that the UK can use to appeal for help from the USA just as the tit-for-tat reprisals become overtly physical. In the last scene, Parvin stands stricken with grief because Trusov has sacrificed himself.

== Cast ==
- Hannah Khalique-Brown as Saara Parvin, a second-year computer science student
- Simon Pegg as Danny Patrick, GCHQ Head of Operations
- Maisie Richardson-Sellers as Kathy Freeman, an NSA analyst detailed to GCHQ (series 1)
- Edward Holcroft as James Cox, a teacher and Saara's live-in boyfriend (series 1)
- Adrian Lester as Prime Minister Andrew Makinde (series 1; guest series 2)
- Alex Jennings as David Neal, Director of GCHQ
- Mark Rylance as John Yeabsley, a longtime employee of GCHQ (series 1)
- Alfie Friedman as Gabriel Davies, a GCHQ mathematician and code breaker (series 1)
- Kerry Godliman as Angie McMurray, the head of Russia Global News (RGN) in the UK (series 1)
- German Segal as Vadim Trusov, a Russian programmer, and the son of a wealthy and influential Russian arms dealer, from whom Vadim is estranged
- Joss Porter as Phil, a GCHQ analyst
- Tinatin Dalakishvili as Marina Veselova, a Russian journalist and single mother (series 1)
- Tom McKay as Max Kelly
- Ed Stoppard as Richard Marston, the newly elevated Foreign Secretary and a constant thorn in Danny’s side
- Siân Brooke as Barbara Napier, Danny’s wife, ex-MI6 and now an analyst at GCHQ (series 2)
- Danny Sapani as Charlie Francis, GCHQ’s Head of Security and Danny’s childhood friend. (series 2)
- Chloe Pirrie as Lt Colonel Roz Cavendish, seconded by Marston to GCHQ in the newly created role of Director of Rapid Response, a move which Danny interprets as a threat to his authority (series 2)
- Jason Tobin as Nicky Chan (series 2)
- Gavin Spokes as Alex Sheldon (series 2)

== Series overview ==
Series	Episodes	Originally released
1	6	30 June 2022
2	6	21 July 2026

== Episodes ==
=== Series 1 (2022) ===
No. overall	No. in series	Title	Directed by	Written by	Original release date	US airdate
1	1	"Episode 1"	Peter Kosminsky	Peter Kosminsky	30 June 2022	18 August 2022
2	2	"Episode 2"	Peter Kosminsky	Declan Lawn, Adam Patterson & Amelia Spencer	30 June 2022	18 August 2022
3	3	"Episode 3"	Peter Kosminsky	Declan Lawn, Adam Patterson & Amelia Spencer	30 June 2022	18 August 2022
4	4	"Episode 4"	Peter Kosminsky	Declan Lawn, Adam Patterson & Amelia Spencer	30 June 2022	18 August 2022
5	5	"Episode 5"	Peter Kosminsky	Declan Lawn, Adam Patterson & Amelia Spencer	30 June 2022	18 August 2022
6	6	"Episode 6"	Peter Kosminsky	Declan Lawn, Adam Patterson & Amelia Spencer	30 June 2022	18 August 2022

=== Series 2 (2026) ===
No. overall	No. in series	Title	Directed by	Written by	Original release date	US airdate
7	1	"Episode 1"	Paul McGuigan	Colin Teevan	21 July 2026	27 August 2026
8	2	"Episode 2"	Paul McGuigan	Colin Teevan	21 July 2026	27 August 2026
9	3	"Episode 3"	Paul McGuigan	Amy Ng & Colin Teevan	21 July 2026	27 August 2026
10	4	"Episode 4"	Paul McGuigan	Emily Marcuson & Colin Teevan	21 July 2026	27 August 2026
11	5	"Episode 5"	Paul McGuigan	Roland Walters	21 July 2026	27 August 2026
12	6	"Episode 6"	Paul McGuigan	Colin Teevan	21 July 2026	27 August 2026

== Music ==
The music in the series was assembled by Debbie Wiseman and most notably included in several places throughout the series a folk adaptation of the Cossack lament written by Nikolai Verevkin, Under the green willow (or Black Raven). The version in the show was provided by the London-based singers Evelyn Bates and Violet Verigo whose rendition is influenced by Pelageya's performance.

== Release ==
In the United Kingdom, the first series aired from 30 June 2022 on Channel 4. The second series in full premiered on 21 July 2026.

In the United States, the first series was released on Peacock on 18 August 2022. The second series premiered on 27 August 2026.

== Reception ==
=== Critical response ===
The first series has a 68% approval rating on Rotten Tomatoes based on 25 reviews, with an average rating of 5.3/10. The website's critical consensus reads, "While The Undeclared War isn't as convincingly brainy as it purports itself to be, it satisfies as a well-acted and visually dynamic cybercrime thriller." On Metacritic, the first series has a weighted score of 59 out of 100 based on 15 reviews, indicating "mixed or average reviews".

The Guardian pointed out that any cyber thriller is inevitably tense “ but people bashing away on computers in a bunker near Cheltenham is inherently unsexy.”

=== Controversy ===
The show's June 2022 adverts were inspired by the panic-provoking 1938 radio adaption of The War of the Worlds, and subject to complaints to the UK broadcasting regulator Ofcom due to the adverts being broadcast as if they were live news broadcasts. The few complainants had focused on the fact that the Prime Minister himself had appeared on screen – seemingly unable to discern that it was black actor Adrian Lester, in a country which has never had a black PM, rather than actual white-skinned PM Boris Johnson, then in his third year in office – which had made them panic about a pending attack. Ofcom simply acknowledged that the complaints had been received, and no further comments were ever issued by the organisation.

== See also ==
- Cyberwarfare by Russia
