= Jonah Hauer-King =

British actor (born 1995)

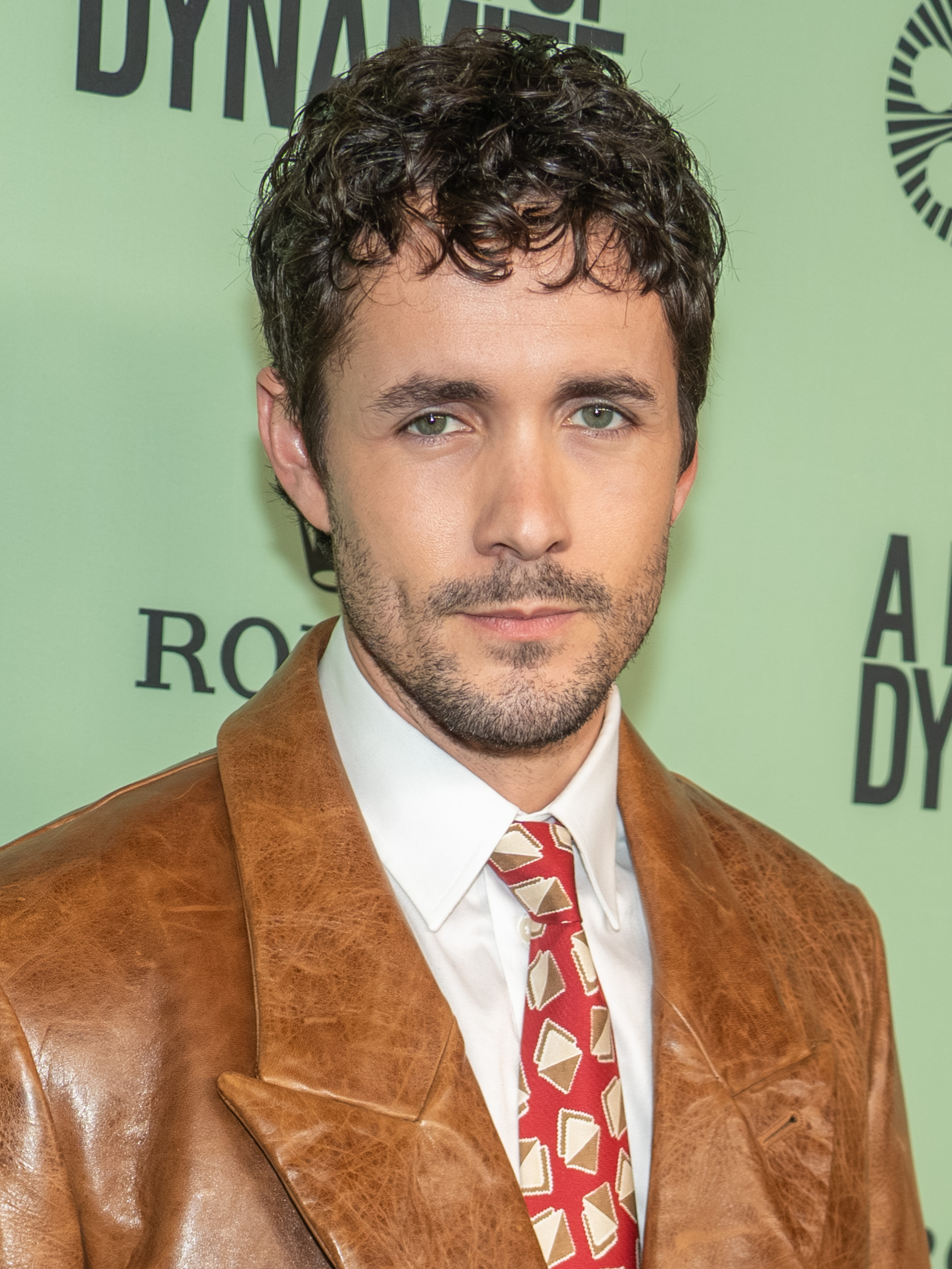
- Hauer-King in 2025
- Born: Jonah Andre Hauer-King; May 30, 1995 (age 31); Islington, London, England
- Citizenship: United Kingdom; United States
- Education: St John's College, Cambridge
- Occupation: Actor
- Years active: 2014–present

Jonah Andre Hauer-King (born 30 May 1995) is a British-American actor. He is best known for playing Prince Eric in Disney's musical fantasy film The Little Mermaid (2023). He has appeared in the television series Howards End (2017), Little Women (2017), World on Fire (2019–2023), and Doctor Who (2025), and in the films The Last Photograph (2017), A Dog's Way Home (2019), I Know What You Did Last Summer (2025), and A House of Dynamite (2025).

== Early life and education ==
Hauer-King was raised in Canonbury, North London at Hauer-King House, the son of Debra Hauer, an American psychotherapist and former theatre producer originally from Walnut Creek, California, and Jeremy King, a prominent London restaurateur originally from Burnham-on-Sea, Somerset. Hauer-King has dual British and American citizenship and was raised in his mother's Jewish faith. His mother's family were Polish Jewish immigrants, initially to Toronto, Ontario, Canada.

Hauer-King attended The Hall School, Eton College and then St John's College, Cambridge, where he graduated with a degree in theology and religious studies, juggling acting roles on stage and screen whilst he was there.

== Career ==
Hauer-King's first feature was a lead role in Danny Huston's The Last Photograph, which received its world premiere at the Edinburgh International Film Festival. He played Laurie in the 2017 BBC version of Little Women, and starred as Andrius Aras in the film Ashes in the Snow (2018) opposite Bel Powley, Paul Wilcox in Howards End, and as David in Postcards from London (2018). He also starred as Lucas in the film A Dog's Way Home (2019). His other roles include The Song of Names and This Is the Night. He played Harry Chase in the BBC World War II drama World on Fire (2019–2023). Jonah also portrayed Max Mallowan in the 2019 film Agatha and the Curse of Ishtar. On 12 November 2019, it was announced that Hauer-King would play Prince Eric in The Little Mermaid which was released on 26 May 2023. He has since starred as the lead character Lali, in Sky's adaptation of The Tattooist of Auschwitz, and as the character Milo Griffin in Sony Pictures's legacy sequel I Know What You Did Last Summer.

== Filmography ==
Key
†	Denotes films that have not yet been released

=== Film ===
Year	Title	Role	Notes	Ref.
2017	The Last Photograph	Luke Hammond		
2018	Postcards from London	David		
2018	Old Boys	Winchester		
2018	Ashes in the Snow	Andrius Aras		
2019	A Dog's Way Home	Lucas		
2019	The Song of Names	Dovidl, aged 17–23		
2021	This Is the Night	Christian Dedea		
2021	Absence	Absence (voice)	Short film	
2022	Safe Word	Boy		
2023	The Little Mermaid	Prince Eric		
2024	William Tell	Rudenz		
2024	A Beautiful Imperfection	Giacomo Casanova		
2024	Rich Flu	Sebastian Snail Jr.		
2025	The Threesome	Connor Blake		
2025	I Know What You Did Last Summer	Milo Griffin		
2025	A House of Dynamite	Lieutenant Commander Robert Reeves		
2026	The Face of Horror	Edward		

=== Television ===
Year	Title	Role	Notes	Ref.
2017	Howards End	Paul Wilcox	2 episodes	
2017	Little Women	Theodore "Laurie" Laurence	3 episodes	
2019–2023	World on Fire	Harry Chase	Main role	
2019	Agatha and the Curse of Ishtar	Max Mallowan	Television film	
2022	The Flatshare	Mo	Main role	
2024	The Tattooist of Auschwitz	Lale Sokolov	Main role	
2025	Doctor Who	Conrad Clark	3 episodes	

=== Discography ===
Year	Soundtrack	Song	Label	Notes	Ref.
2018	Postcards from London	"Lover (Muse)"	Davray Music Ltd.	Also writer	
2023	The Little Mermaid	"Fathoms Below"	Walt Disney		
2023	The Little Mermaid	"Wild Uncharted Waters"	Walt Disney		
