= Hannah Khalique-Brown =

English actress

- Born: 1998 or 1999 (age 27–28); Birmingham, England
- Education: King's College London (BA)
- Occupation: Actress
- Years active: 2020–present
- Agent: The Gersh Agency
- Notable work: The Undeclared War, Barbie, Wolf Hall: The Mirror and the Light
- Spouse: Benedict Mann (m. 2024)

Hannah Rose Khalique-Brown (born in 1998 or 1999) is a British actress. On television, she is known for starring in the Channel 4 series The Undeclared War (2022–). Her films include Barbie (2023).

== Early life and education ==
Hannah Khalique-Brown was born in Birmingham, England. Her father worked as an NHS surgeon and her mother, a barrister.

She attended King Edward VI Camp Hill School for Girls, where she completed A Levels in English, history, and philosophy & ethics. She had her first acting experience in a year 9 boys' school production of Alice in Wonderland.

Khalique-Brown graduated with first class honours from King's College London in 2020 with a Bachelor of Arts degree in English literature.

== Career ==
In August 2019, Khalique-Brown auditioned for The DABB Generals Day, and won a spot to perform in front of leading industry professionals at their partnered location, Southwark Playhouse, after which she received three agents' offers. In 2021, Khalique-Brown made her television debut with a seven-episode role as Anita Chandola in the BBC One medical soap opera Doctors.

The following year, she earned her breakout role as Saara Parvin in Peter Kosminsky's Channel 4 thriller series The Undeclared War. Khalique-Brown was lauded by critics for her breakout, as a "newcomer" who "lead[s] the cast in her scene-stealing (and surely star making) breakout role as Saara”. She was praised unanimously in broadsheets for her performance, with The Times writing: “Khalique-Brown gives a masterclass in restrained acting”. The New Statesman wrote: “Khalique-Brown, a newcomer, is sensational” and The Sunday Times wrote: "there are few experienced actors who can share a scene with Rylance and not disappear and Khalique-Brown holds her own." A second season of The Undeclared War was announced in February 2025.

In 2024, Khalique-Brown reunited with Kosminsky and Rylance to play Dorothea Wolsey in the BAFTA nominated Wolf Hall: The Mirror and the Light. The Daily Telegraph wrote: "The standout scene […] sees Cromwell at his most vulnerable, as he attempts to reach out to Cardinal Wolsey's illegitimate daughter, Dorothea (Hannah Khalique-Brown)". Other critics also praised Khalique-Brown’s performance opposite Rylance as a standout, with The Guardian writing: "There is an extraordinary scene with the illegitimate daughter of his beloved Cardinal Wolsey that blows your mind as it breaks your heart. Along with him, you must gather the scattered pieces of both before you can continue."

After making her feature film debut with a minor role in What's Love Got to Do with It?, Khalique-Brown played the discontinued Growing Up Skipper doll in the film Barbie directed by Greta Gerwig and starring Margot Robbie.

She starred in the silent horror film Year 10 and appeared in the HBO series Dune: Prophecy as Sister Farouz, the Netflix series Black Doves as Maggie, and the BBC series Virdee as Leila.

On stage, Khalique-Brown starred as lead role Alice in the 2021 Southwark Playhouse production of I Know, I Know, I Know, with critics praising her as "outstanding as the exposed and vulnerable Alice in what is essentially an extended monologue".

Khalique-Brown's latest theatre role was as Mary Lennox in the 2024 stage adaptation of The Secret Garden at the Regent's Park Open Air Theatre, which won numerous five-star reviews, written by fellow King's College London alumna Holly Robinson. Khalique-Brown was lauded by broadsheet critics, with The Independent praising her as "a real find", TimeOut describing Khalique-Brown as "outstanding as Mary Lennox – imperious and fragile and very funny", and The Times naming her "a fast rising star".

Khalique-Brown voiced the lead role of Indira in the BBC Radio 4 audio drama War of Words, an espionage drama about weaponised narrative and conspiracy written by Neil Brand. She portrayed Hanna in 2025 Audible audio drama Mrs Bibi.

== Personal life ==
Khalique-Brown married the musician Benedict Mann in 2024. They perform together in the British five-piece jam band Big Sky Orchestra.

In 2025, Khalique-Brown was elected into the Young Members Committee of the British actors union Equity.

== Filmography ==
=== Film ===
Year	Title	Role	Notes
2020	Tin Luck	Leila	Short film
2020	Two's a Menace	Charlene	Short film
2021	Muse	Bonnie	
2022	What's Love Got to Do with It?	Girl in Hijab	
2023	Barbie	Growing Up Skipper	
2024	Year 10	Girl	
2024	Worst. Experience. Ever.	Maya	Short Film

=== Television ===
Year	Title	Role	Notes
2021	Doctors	Anita Chandola	7 episodes
2022–present	The Undeclared War	Saara Parvin	Main cast
2024	Wolf Hall: The Mirror and the Light	Dorothea	5 episodes
2024	Dune: Prophecy	Sister Farouz	Episode: "The Hidden Hand"
2024	Black Doves	Maggie	2 episodes
2025	Virdee	Leila	

== Stage ==
Year	Title	Role	Notes
2022	I Know, I Know, I Know	Alice	Lead role, Southwark Playhouse
2024	The Secret Garden	Mary Lennox	Lead role, Regent's Park Open Air Theatre

== Radio ==
Year	Title	Role	Notes
2022	War of Words	Indira	Lead role, BBC Radio 4
2025	Mrs Bibi	Hannah	Audio Drama, Audible
