= Lucky Guy (play) =

2013 play written by Nora Ephron

- Written by: Nora Ephron
- Subject: Mike McAlary journalist career

Premiere
- Date: April 1, 2013
- Place: Broadhurst Theatre, 235 West 44th Street, New York, New York, USA

Lucky Guy is a play by Nora Ephron that premiered in 2013, the year after her death. It was Ephron's final work and marked Tom Hanks's Broadway debut, in which he earned a Theatre World Award and a Tony nomination. It depicts the story of journalist Mike McAlary beginning in 1985 and ending with his death at the age of 41 in 1998. The plot covers the high points and tribulations of McAlary's career as he traverses the clubby atmosphere of the New York City tabloid industry in what some regard as its heyday. The play includes his near fatal automobile accident and devotes a large portion to his recovery.

Originally conceived as a television film in 1999, the play spent years under revision before finally opening on Broadway in 2013. Regarded as an elegy, the story harkens back to the days of tabloid journalism before the 24-hour news reporting cycle. The production received six nominations for Tony Awards, winning two, including Courtney B. Vance for Tony Award for Best Featured Actor in a Play. The play received considerable critical comment, partly because it was Ephron's last play and partly because of Hanks's debut. Critical reaction was generally warm to mixed, and the limited Broadway run was profitable.

== Background and composition ==
Ephron first conceived of this story in 1999 as an HBO movie. Ephron focused the story on the career of New York City tabloid columnist Mike McAlary from his early beginnings to his rise to stardom, when he received the 1998 Pulitzer Prize for Commentary for exposing police brutality against a Haitian immigrant named Abner Louima in Brooklyn's 70th precinct, and his death, eight months later, of cancer. Ephron, who had been a New York Post reporter, had previously written about her own career in journalism in the novel I Remember Nothing. She once wrote, "I can’t remember which came first—wanting to be a journalist or wanting to date a journalist"; she had a thing for journalists like McAlary. Since McAlary died of cancer and Ephron had spent her six years with cancer by directing a film and writing two plays, Chris Jones of the Chicago Tribune speculates that Ephron chose this subject because she shared a bond with a journalist who "also did some of his best writing while battling cancer".

Ephron began background interviews with McAlary's colleagues, including Jim Dwyer, in the months after McAlary's Christmas 1998 death. In 2005, the film idea was floated again, but Ephron said she could not get her preferred leading actor. In 2011, Ephron succeeded in attracting Hanks to the project. Hanks had previously starred in Ephron's popular films, Sleepless in Seattle and You've Got Mail, but he had last performed live in the theatre in 1979 for Riverside Shakespeare Company's production of The Mandrake. The play is the final and posthumous work of Ephron, who died the year before its production.

Gabriel Rotello blogged about McAlary in The Huffington Post after hearing about the play. He noted that McAlary represented a lot of things to a lot of people, but as the first openly gay columnist, Rotello viewed McAlary unfavorably. According to Rotello, McAlary was an aggressive journalist who had a reputation for reporting on corrupt cops and miscreants in New York City's crack era. He relied heavily on police sources, hanging out with then-New York City Police Commissioner William Bratton and his mouthpiece, John Miller. His career was built on high-level access rather than using street sources and fact-corroboration. He became prominent in the public eye in spring 1994 when a black lesbian reported that she had been raped in broad daylight in Brooklyn's Prospect Park. McAlary's report, "Rape Hoax the Real Crime", alleged that the woman had concocted the story, intending to use it for political purposes such as speaking at lesbian rallies. New York had recently endured the Tawana Brawley rape allegations, and gaybashing was at its apex. The police then revealed substantial evidence in support of the woman's story and Rotello, who was then with New York Newsday, got Miller on tape saying that McAlary was begging his police contacts to back him up. McAlary lost credibility with the police and the gay community. Rotello concedes, however, that McAlary later had major success.

== Plot ==
Act I

Mike McAlary, from 1985 to 1993, bounds from one New York City newsroom to another as he achieves career success, covering such stories as the tainted Tylenol case and the Buddy Boys of the 7-7 scandal. His salary increases as he ascends from being a cub reporter to star crime reporter to star columnist. In 1993, McAlary's suffers a near-fatal auto accident that leaves him physically impaired.

Act II

McAlary recovers from the accident and writes two defining stories of his career: the Jane Doe rape case, during which he is sued for libel after his column questions the truthfulness of the victim, and the Abner Louima story, for which he wins the Pulitzer. Eight months after he publishes the Louima story, on Christmas Day 1998, he succumbs to cancer at age 41.

== Themes ==
According to David Rooney of The Hollywood Reporter, the play is an "elegy for an already remote era in journalism" that predates the current 24-hour news cycle and the "decimation of the newspaper business". Joe Dziemianowicz of the New York Daily News wrote that the play is a "love letter to scruffy and scrappy New York City tabloids" Nikhil Kumar of The Independent says that the play depicts "the heyday of the New York tabloids in the 80s, when the Daily News, the Post and the upstart Newsday lined up against each other".

According to Richard Zoglin of Time, "Lucky Guy captures the hard-drinking, boys-club camaraderie, gets into the weeds of how reporters actually get people to talk, and shows us the rivalries and egos and dubious ethics that are all part of the package". In the end it is "a celebration of old-fashioned tabloid journalism in the heart of the city’s other great indigenous and endangered industry, Broadway theater." When the play closed, its run was described by Mike Lupica as a "New York Story" in addition to being a sentimental depiction of newspaper journalism.

== Production history ==
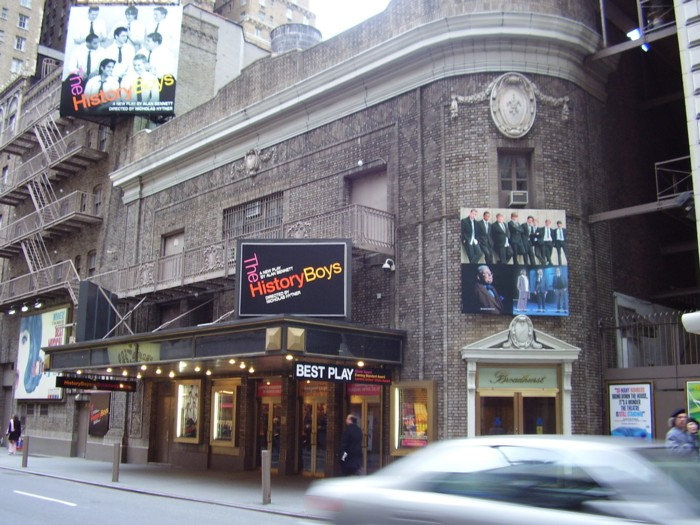
Lucky Guy debuted at the Broadhurst Theatre on April 1, 2013

Ephron had approached her long-time friend Hanks to play McAlary in a film in 1999, but his distaste for tabloids dissuaded him from taking the role. When the two reacquainted while Hanks was promoting Larry Crowne in 2011, she informed him that she had converted the work into a play and that Hugh Jackman had even done a table read. Hanks asked for the latest version of the script and found that he liked McAlary's swagger in the new version. In May 2012, Hanks was in negotiations for the role of McAlary, and George C. Wolfe was in line to direct. Ephron met with Wolfe weekly and was producing new drafts for each meeting to sharpen McAlary's character. She and Wolfe continued to mold the project up to her very last days. When Ephron died in late June, producer Colin Callender confirmed that the play was greenlit as a tribute to Ephron, although it was no longer clear if Hanks or Wolfe would remain involved. Wolfe was announced as the director, and Hanks was announced to play McAlary, in October 2012.

Postmortem changes to the script were reviewed by journalist and Ephron's widower Nicholas Pileggi. Maura Tierney and Courtney B. Vance were added to the cast, which included Hanks' former Bosom Buddies co-star Peter Scolari, on January 7, 2013. The complete cast was announced on January 11. Eventually, the production settled on a very basic shifting set design by David Rockwell. McAlary had been portrayed previously in Dan Klores' The Wood, which played Off-Broadway in 2011.

Previews for Lucky Guy began at the Broadhurst Theatre on March 1, 2013, without an out-of-town tryout. During previews, the play grossed an unusually high (for a non-musical) $1 million per week and by the time the play debuted it had stockpiled $10 million in advance ticket sales. The play debuted on Broadway at the Broadhurst Theatre on April 1, 2013 after 33 previews. It was directed by Wolfe, with Hanks starring as McAlary, receiving $150,000 per week for his 12.5% share of the gross. On May 2, 2013, it was announced that Lucky Guy had recouped its $3.6 million capitalization costs. Although regular ticket prices for Lucky Guy started at $87 and went up to $152, the production was able to take advantage of the Broadway pricing strategy in which "premium" ticket prices fluctuate to balance supply and demand, and premium tickets ranged from $225 to $350, with standing-room only tickets also becoming popular. Originally scheduled to run until June 16, 2013, the play was extended to July 3. The run ended with a total of 33 previews and 104 regular performances. The show grossed $22,992,145 for an audience of 163,710 patrons in these 104 performances.

== Roles and original cast ==
Many of the play's characters are based on real people. The following were the opening night credits.

- Mike McAlary – Tom Hanks
- John Cotter – Peter Gerety
- Jerry Nachman and Stanley Joyce – Richard D. Masur
- Eddie Hayes – Christopher McDonald
- Michael Daly – Peter Scolari
- Alice McAlary – Maura Tierney
- James "Hap" Hairston – Courtney B. Vance
- Brian O'Regan – Brian Dykstra
- Jim Dwyer – Michael Gaston
- Dino Tortorici – Dustyn Gulledge
- Reporter – Andrew Hovelson
- Louise Imerman and Debby Krenek – Deirdre Lovejoy
- Bob Drury and John Miller – Danny Mastrogiorgio
- Abner Louima – Stephen Tyrone Williams

== Critical reaction ==
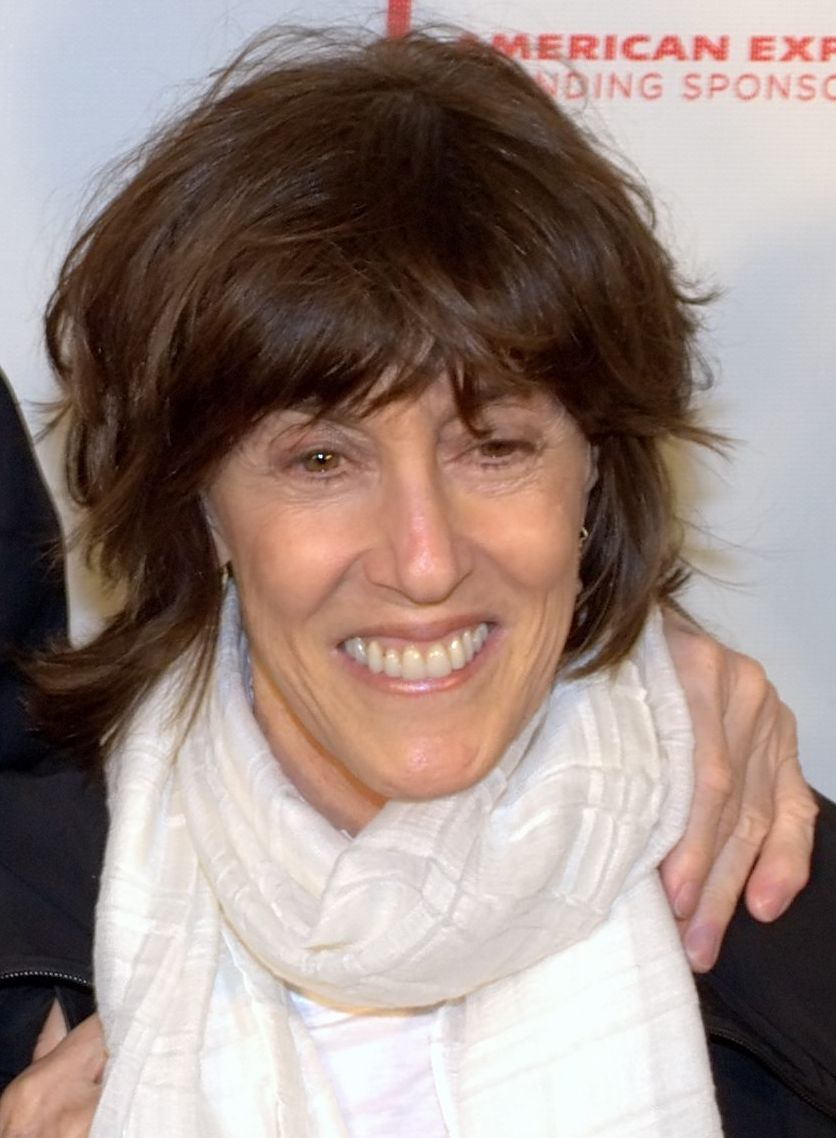
Lucky Guy was Nora Ephron's final play.

Reviewers considered the play notable as Hanks' debut and Ephron's posthumous finale, and reactions were generally warm to mixed. A glowing review was delivered by Ben Brantley of The New York Times: "Lucky Guy is both an elegy and a valentine to a vanishing world held dear in the collective imagination of New Yorkers, that of the rough-and-tumble of big-city newsrooms and scoop-hungry reporters." Brantley also noted that the play was scripted "with a true fan’s glee and avidity". New York Observer critic Rex Reed also enthused: "It’s a play that grabs you by the throat, makes you laugh and cry, holds you transfixed for two hours, paralyzes you from start to finish, and leaves you cheering." New York Magazine critic Jesse Green similarly commented: "With an insider's devastating combination of repulsion and affection, Nora Ephron has written a most unlikely thing: a play about journalism, or really about telling stories, that is as rich and rough and elegiac and fun as the lost world it re-creates."

A negative review by Michael Dale in Broadway World judged that the play suffers from a lack of focus and would be better served by focusing on either of the rape cases that brought McAlary notoriety or by deepening McAlary's character. The review further commented that the supporting roles only serve "to move the narrative along or to dole out information about the lucky one". Dale said that the casting of Hanks was sentimental rather than ideal and that even his best use of his everyman persona paled in comparison to the person he portrayed. Entertainment Weekly critic Lisa Schwarzbaum gave the play a C+ grade noting that it is "a show rolling in good will and affection for the playwright", for the debut of Hanks, and for "the real-life story" of McAlary. She was disappointed, however, after two hours of "a dull, stalled play about a not-particularly-noteworthy mug with a flair for self-promotion". A reviewer for Financial Times, writing about another piece, called Lucky Guy a "mediocre show".

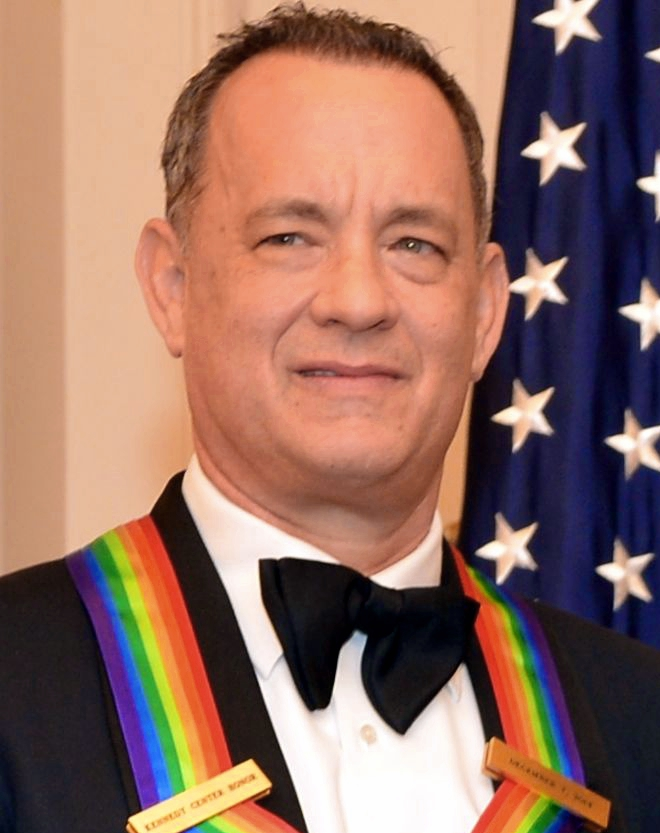
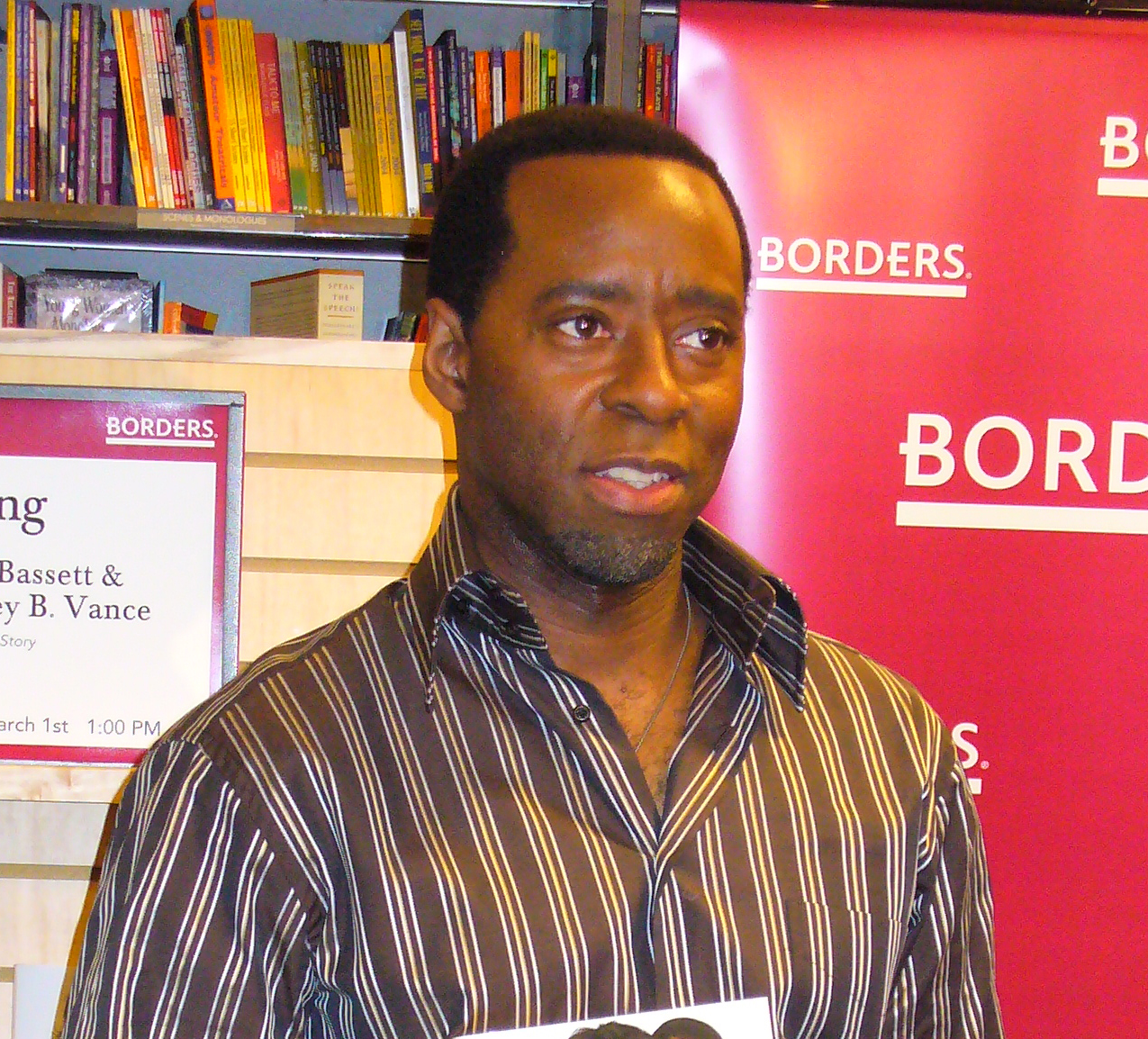
Tom Hanks (left) and Courtney B. Vance (right) received critical praise for their performances

A mixed review by Alexis Soloski in The Guardian called the play "a profane love letter to the lost, rollicking world of New York tabloid journalism. It is also a tribute to its real-life fallen son, the brash reporter Mike McAlary." The portrayal of McAlary's relationship with his wife, however, lacked vibrance, and that the play does not demonstrate McAlary's skill at leveraging his sources. Soloski also stated that the casting of the 56-year-old Hanks to depict the character from age 28 to age 41 was unusual, but other critics stated that Hanks "looks the part".

In The Hollywood Reporter, Rooney wrote that Ephron presents an "entertaining salute to the tabloid newspaper business" and "smartly enlists a garrulous crew of reporters and editors to serve as the oral-history vessel for her nostalgic look back". Rooney judged that the play was "Directed with warmth and vitality by George C. Wolfe, it’s performed with relish by a dynamic cast of pros, piloted by an uncharacteristically rough-edged Tom Hanks." Rooney described the play as unexceptional, cursory and simple, despite its intelligent writing, engrossing and often funny dialogue and commented that: "Brimming with testosterone and grit, it’s an unabashed celebration of male camaraderie, swaggering ambition and competitiveness." Kumar, writing in The Independent, was disappointed in the play's depth and Hanks's acting, but thought that Courtney B. Vance's portrayal of Hap Hairston, who was one of McAlary's editors was a highlight.

== Awards and nominations ==
The play received six Tony Awards nominations for the 67th Tony Awards to be held on June 9. Courtney B. Vance won the Tony Award for Best Featured Actor in a Play The Best Lighting Design of a Play award went to Jules Fisher and Peggy Eisenhauer. Tom Hanks received a Theatre World Award for Outstanding Broadway or Off-Broadway Debut Performance.

The production received Drama League Award nominations for Outstanding Production of a Broadway or Off-Broadway Play and distinguished Performance Award nominations for both Tom Hanks and Courtney B. Vance. The production received two Outer Critics Circle Award nominations, but did not win: Outstanding New Broadway Play and Outstanding Actor in a Play (Tom Hanks). Hanks received the play's only Drama Desk nomination.

=== Original Broadway production ===
| Year | Award | Category | Nominee | Result |
|---|---|---|---|---|
| 2013 | Drama League Award | Outstanding Production of a Broadway or Off-Broadway Play | | Nominated |
| 2013 | Drama League Award | Distinguished Performance Award | Tom Hanks | Nominated |
| 2013 | Drama League Award | Distinguished Performance Award | Courtney B. Vance | Nominated |
| 2013 | Outer Critics Circle Award | Outstanding New Broadway Play | | Nominated |
| 2013 | Outer Critics Circle Award | Outstanding Actor in a Play | Tom Hanks | Nominated |
| 2013 | Drama Desk Award | Outstanding Actor in a Play | Tom Hanks | Nominated |
| 2013 | Tony Award (67th) | Best Play | | Nominated |
| 2013 | Tony Award (67th) | Best Actor in a Play | Tom Hanks | Nominated |
| 2013 | Tony Award (67th) | Best Featured Actor in a Play | Courtney B. Vance | Won |
| 2013 | Tony Award (67th) | Best Direction of a Play | George C. Wolfe | Nominated |
| 2013 | Tony Award (67th) | Best Scenic Design of a Play | David Rockwell | Nominated |
| 2013 | Tony Award (67th) | Best Lighting Design of a Play | Jules Fisher; Peggy Eisenhauer | Won |
| 2013 | Theatre World Award | | Tom Hanks | Won |
