= Harry Potter and the Cursed Child =

2016 play by Jack Thorne

- Promotional poster for the 2023 Broadway run
- Written by: Jack Thorne
- Story by: J. K. Rowling; Jack Thorne; John Tiffany
- Based on: Harry Potter by J. K. Rowling
- Produced by: Sonia Friedman Productions; Playground Entertainment; Harry Potter Theatrical Productions
- Date premiered: 30 July 2016; 10 years ago
- Place premiered: Palace Theatre, London
- Composer: Imogen Heap
- Costume designer: Katrina Lindsay
- Lighting designer: Neil Austin
- Set designer: Christine Jones
- Movement director: Steven Hoggett
- Sound designer: Gareth Fry
- Special effects: Jamie Harrison
- Music supervisor: Martin Lowe
- Original language: English
- Genre: Adventure; Drama; Fantasy
- Setting: Wizarding World

Harry Potter and the Cursed Child is a play written by Jack Thorne from an original story by Thorne, J. K. Rowling, and John Tiffany. The plot occurs nineteen years after the events of Rowling's novel Harry Potter and the Deathly Hallows. It follows Albus Severus Potter, the second son of Harry Potter, now the Head of the Department of Magical Law Enforcement at the Ministry of Magic. When Albus arrives at Hogwarts to get sorted into Gryffindor, he gets officially sorted into Slytherin and feels unable to live up to his father's legacy, making him resentful of his father.

Since its premiere, Harry Potter and the Cursed Child has received mostly positive reviews from critics for its performances, story, illusions, and stage wizardry, though reception from the Harry Potter fandom was more polarised. The original West End production premiered at the Palace Theatre on 7 June 2016. It received a record-breaking (at the time) eleven nominations and won a to-this-day unprecedented tally of nine awards, including Best New Play, at the 2017 Laurence Olivier Awards. A Broadway production opened at the Lyric Theatre on 22 April 2018. That production received ten nominations and won six awards, including Best Play at the 2018 Tony Awards. An Australian production opened at the Princess Theatre in Melbourne, on 23 February 2019. A second American production opened in San Francisco at the Curran Theatre on 1 December 2019. The first non-Anglophone production opened at the Mehr! Theater in Hamburg, Germany, on 5 December 2021. A Canadian production opened at the Ed Mirvish Theatre in Toronto, on 19 June 2022. A Japanese production opened at the TBS Akasaka ACT Theater on 8 July 2022. A North American Tour began in September 2024 in Chicago's James M. Nederlander Theatre. The Tour also included shows in Los Angeles and Washington, D.C. Across all its productions worldwide, Harry Potter and the Cursed Child has sold over six million tickets.

The play was originally produced as a two-parter that could be viewed on the same day (i.e. in the afternoon and in the evening) or over two evenings. In June 2021, it was re-staged as a single 3½-hour show for future performances on Broadway in November 2021. In 2022, the San Francisco, Melbourne, Toronto, and Tokyo productions also adopted the one-part revision, with Hamburg following in 2023. The Broadway production currently has a shorter runtime of 2 hours and 55 minutes. The remaining two-part production in the West End closed on 20 September 2026 and re-opened as the one-part play on 9 October 2026.

== Background ==
In December 2013, it was revealed that a stage play based on the Harry Potter series had been in development for around a year, with the view to bringing it to the stage sometime in 2016. At the time of the announcement, author J. K. Rowling revealed that the play would "explore the previously untold story of Harry's early years as an orphan and outcast". The following May, Rowling began establishing the creative team for the project.

On 26 June 2015, it was revealed it would receive its world premiere in mid-2016 at London's Palace Theatre. The announcement marked the eighteenth anniversary of the publication of the first Harry Potter novel, Harry Potter and the Philosopher's Stone, published on 26 June 1997.

On announcing plans for the project, Rowling stated that the play would not be a prequel. In response to queries regarding the choice of a play rather than a new novel, Rowling stated that she "is confident that when audiences see the play they will agree that it is the only proper medium for the story". Rowling also assured audiences that the play would contain an entirely new story and would not be a rehashing of previously explored content. On 24 September 2015, Rowling announced that the play had been split into two parts. The parts are designed to be viewed on the same day or consecutively over two evenings.

On 23 October 2015, it was confirmed the plays were set nineteen years after the conclusion of the final novel Harry Potter and the Deathly Hallows, and would open at London's Palace Theatre in July 2016. The plays principally follow Harry Potter, now Head of the Department of Magical Law Enforcement, and his younger son, Albus Severus Potter.

== Plot ==
The play is divided into two parts, consisting of two acts each.

=== Act One ===
In the opening scene, set during the epilogue of Deathly Hallows in the year 2017, Harry and Ginny Potter send their younger son, Albus Severus Potter, on the Hogwarts Express to begin his first year at Hogwarts. Harry works as the Head of Magical Law Enforcement at the Ministry of Magic, while Ginny is the editor of the sports section of The Daily Prophet. Ron Weasley and Hermione Granger also send their daughter Rose on the train. Hermione is now the Minister for Magic, while Ron manages Weasley's Wizard Wheezes in Diagon Alley alongside his brother George. Aboard the Hogwarts Express, Albus befriends Scorpius Malfoy, the son of Harry's former foe Draco and his wife, Astoria. In a break with the tradition of Potters being sorted into Gryffindor, Albus is sorted into Slytherin alongside Scorpius.

Both boys are bullied over the next years, with Albus perceived as failing to live up to his parents, and Scorpius being rumoured to be the son of Lord Voldemort. During this time, Astoria dies due to an inherited blood curse. Albus and Harry drift apart, with Harry being uncertain about how to help Albus. The summer before his fourth year, Albus gets into a fight with Harry, after being given Harry's old baby blanket and a love potion from Ron. In his anger, Harry tells Albus that he wishes he were not his son, and Albus spills the potion on the blanket.

Harry obtains a prototype of a more powerful version of the Time-Turner, which allows one to travel into the past and change history. Simultaneously, Harry's scar starts hurting again, raising concerns that Voldemort may be returning. Amos Diggory, who is cared for by his niece Delphi, asks Harry to use the Time-Turner to prevent the death of his son, Cedric. After overhearing Harry refuse to help the Diggorys, Albus is inspired to do so and convinces Scorpius to help him. The two escape from the Hogwarts Express to visit Amos, and they team up with Delphi to steal the Time-Turner from Hermione's office, in the Ministry of Magic, while disguised with Polyjuice Potion.

=== Act Two ===
As Cedric's death was the result of him winning the Triwizard Tournament alongside Harry, the boys use the Time-Turner to travel back to the first tournament challenge. They disguise themselves as Durmstrang students to sabotage Cedric and prevent his victory. The plan fails, and the disguises cause Hermione to become suspicious of Viktor Krum, a Durmstrang student, and go to the Yule Ball with Ron instead. As a result, Ron never experiences the jealousy fundamental to his relationship with Hermione, and the two never marry. Ron instead falls in love with Padma Patil at the Ball, and Hermione becomes a frustrated professor at Hogwarts. Albus is now in Gryffindor.

Meanwhile, Harry has nightmares about Voldemort. The centaur Bane tells Harry that a "dark cloud" is around Albus. Convinced that Scorpius is a threat to Albus, Harry tries to separate the boys at Hogwarts by attempting to force Headmistress Minerva McGonagall to keep tabs on Albus using the Marauder's Map.

Albus and Scorpius's friendship is destroyed, but the two reconcile after Albus steals Harry's old Invisibility Cloak from Albus's older brother James. Harry relents after a conversation with Draco and Ginny. Meanwhile, Albus and Scorpius make another attempt to use the Time-Turner to save Cedric, this time by humiliating him during the Triwizard Tournament's second task. When Scorpius returns to the present day, Albus is not with him. Dolores Umbridge reveals that Harry is dead and Voldemort rules the wizarding world.

=== Act Three ===
Scorpius discovers that his actions caused Cedric to join the Death Eaters and kill Neville Longbottom, preventing him from killing Nagini and thus allowing Voldemort to win the Battle of Hogwarts. With Harry now dead, Albus never existed, while Voldemort was able to consolidate power and transform the Ministry of Magic into a dictatorial regime. In the new timeline, Scorpius became a popular Head Boy and Quidditch star, helping the staff and students torment Muggle-borns. Umbridge became the new Headmistress of Hogwarts and patrols the school with Dementors and a revived Inquisitorial Squad, led by Scorpius.

A dark figure called "The Augurey" leads the Ministry of Magic. With the help and sacrifice of the alternate versions of Ron, Hermione, and Severus Snape, Scorpius uses the Time-Turner to prevent his and Albus's past actions and restore the original timeline. Scorpius reunites with Albus, and the two are found by their parents, along with Ron and Hermione. Harry scolds Albus, though they begin to reconcile.

Realising the danger the Time-Turner poses, Scorpius and Albus attempt to destroy it, when they are joined by Delphi. Scorpius notices Delphi's tattoo of an Augurey and realises she was in charge of the Ministry of Magic in the alternative timeline. Delphi takes them captive, killing a fellow student in the process, and reveals her intention of restoring the alternate timeline.

After Ron states he saw Albus and Scorpius with Delphi, Harry and Draco confront Amos and discover Delphi had bewitched him into thinking she was his niece. Delphi takes the boys to the final challenge of the Triwizard Tournament, but Albus and Scorpius foil her plans, and Delphi uses the Time-Turner again to travel further back in time. She inadvertently takes the boys with her and destroys the Time-Turner to leave them stranded in time.

Searching Delphi's room, Harry, Draco, Ginny, Hermione, and Ron discover hidden writing on the walls claiming Delphi is the daughter of Voldemort, and describing a prophecy that will allow Voldemort to return.

=== Act Four ===
Albus and Scorpius discover they have been taken back to the night before Harry's parents were killed. They write an invisible message on Harry's baby blanket, knowing in the present, the blanket would become stained with a love potion and expose the message. The message reads: "Dad. Help. Godric's Hollow. 311081."

Meanwhile, Draco reveals the Time-Turner was actually a prototype for a perfected model he has in his possession. After Harry receives the message from the boys, he and his allies use Draco's Time-Turner to travel back in time to save them and stop Delphi. They deduce she intends to convince Voldemort to abandon his attempt to kill Harry, which would ensure Voldemort's survival.

Harry magically disguises himself as Voldemort to distract Delphi; after a struggle, the group subdues her. Rather than killing Delphi, they decide that she will be given a life sentence in Azkaban Prison. Voldemort appears, oblivious to Harry and the group; they allow the murder of Harry's parents to play out, unwilling to risk altering the future again.

After returning to the present, Delphi is sent to Azkaban. Albus and Scorpius decide to be more active at Hogwarts, with Scorpius expressing interest in trying out for the Slytherin Quidditch Team. He also asks Rose to be his friend. Although she turns him down, she becomes more friendly towards him. Harry and Albus visit Cedric's grave, with Harry apologising for his role in Cedric's death. Albus and Harry grow closer. Having worked together in foiling Delphi's plot, Harry and Draco overcome their old enmity.

=== One-part revisions ===
Over an hour and a half of content is cut in the one-part revision of the play to bring the runtime down to three hours and 30 minutes, including a 20-minute intermission. The dream sequences involving young Harry, the Dursleys, and Hagrid are removed, as well as the conversations Scorpius has with Polly Chapman and Draco in the Dark World. The St. Oswald's location is replaced with Amos Diggory's private residence, and the character of Lily Potter Jr. is only mentioned.

The one-part version also makes Albus and Scorpius's relationship more explicitly romantic. Rose is a platonic friend to Scorpius rather than a love interest, and when Harry and Albus visit Cedric's grave, Albus tells Harry that Scorpius will always be the most important person in his life, to which Harry responds warmly. The changes pertaining to Albus and Scorpius's relationship have also been made to the two-part version of the play.

== Productions ==
Production	Venue	First preview	Opening night	Closing night	Language	Notes
West End	Palace Theatre	Part One: 7 June 2016; Part Two: 9 June 2016	30 July 2016	Currently running	English	Two-part play: 7 June 2016 – 20 September 2026; One-part play: From 6 October 2026
Broadway	Lyric Theatre	Part One: 16 March 2018; Part Two: 17 March 2018	22 April 2018	Currently running	English	Two-part play: 16 March 2018 – 12 March 2020; One-part play: 12 November 2021 – present
Melbourne	Princess Theatre	Part One: 18 January 2019; Part Two: 19 January 2019	23 February 2019	9 July 2023	English	Two-part play: 18 January 2019 – 27 March 2022; One-part play: 4 May 2022 – 9 July 2023
San Francisco	Curran Theatre	Part One: 23 October 2019; Part Two: 24 October 2019	1 December 2019	11 September 2022	English	Two-part play: 23 October 2019 – 11 March 2020; One-part play: 9 February – 11 September 2022
Hamburg	Mehr! Theater	Part One: 23 November 2021; Part Two: 24 November 2021	5 December 2021	26 July 2026	German	Two-part play: 5 December 2021 – 8 January 2023; One-part play: 9 February 2023 – present
Toronto	Ed Mirvish Theatre	31 May 2022	19 June 2022	2 July 2023	English	
Tokyo	TBS Akasaka ACT Theater	16 June 2022	8 July 2022	Currently running	Japanese	
The Hague	AFAS Circustheater	3 March 2026	14 March 2026	Currently running	Dutch	Set transfer from San Francisco

Harry Potter and the Cursed Child, a two-part play, was written by British playwright Jack Thorne based on an original story by Rowling, John Tiffany, and Thorne. Some websites listed all three as authors of the script, but by 26 July 2016, the official website for the play and many others were listing Thorne as the sole script writer.

The play is directed by Tiffany with choreography by Steven Hoggett, set design by Christine Jones, costume design by Katrina Lindsay, lighting design by Neil Austin, music by Imogen Heap, and sound design by Gareth Fry. In addition, special effects were created by Jeremy Chernick, with illusions by Jamie Harrison, and musical supervision by Martin Lowe.

The producers and Rowling have maintained a campaign called #KeepTheSecrets to ask people who have seen the play not to reveal its major twists. The slogan is printed on the tickets for the play and badges with the slogan are handed out for free during intervals. People buying their tickets online are emailed a video after the play from J. K. Rowling asking them to support the campaign.

=== West End (2016–present) ===
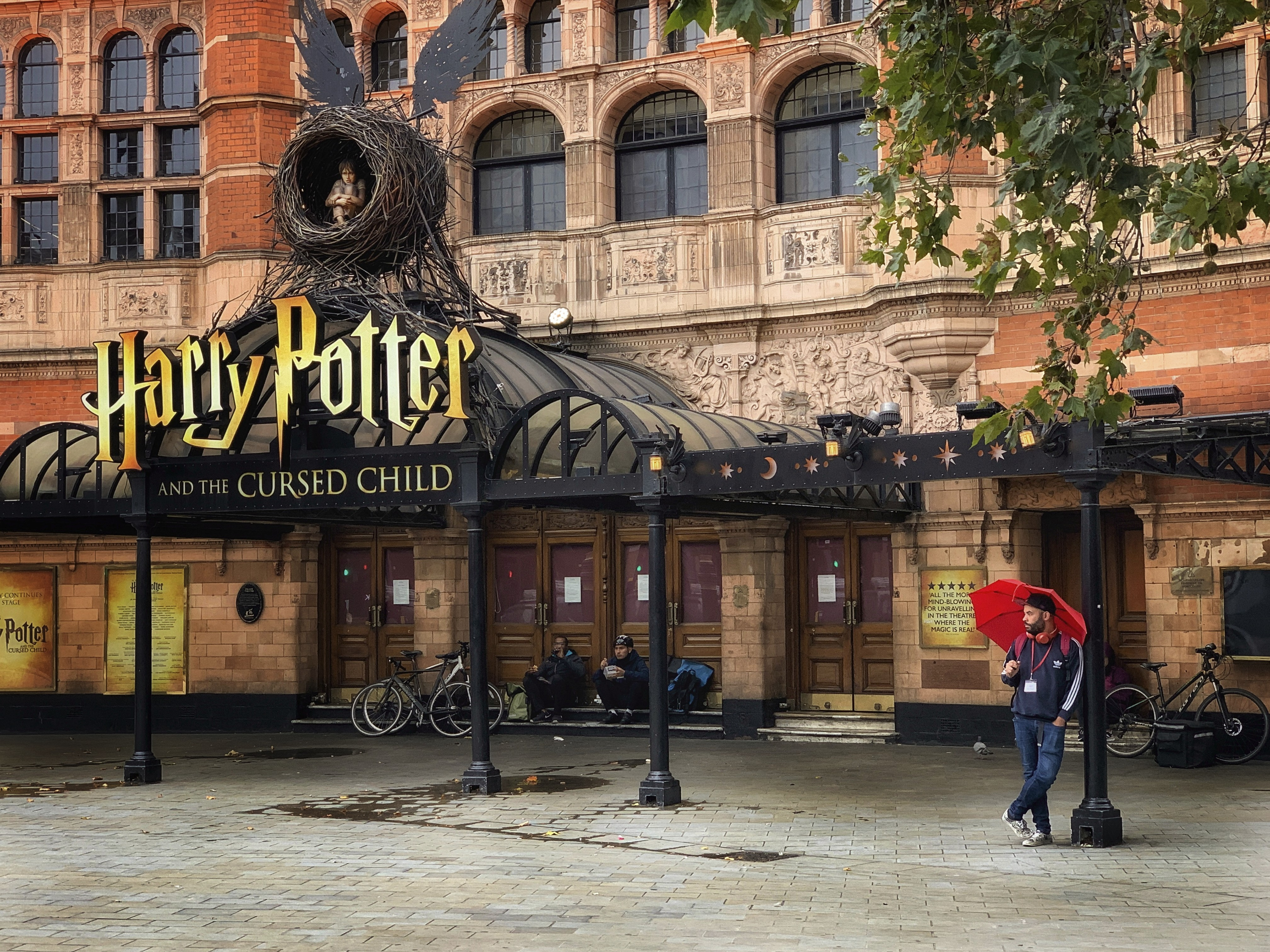
Marquee at the Palace Theatre, September 2020

On 26 June 2015, it was announced that Harry Potter and the Cursed Child would make its world premiere at the Palace Theatre in the West End.

Tickets went on sale to preregistered priority members on 28 October 2015, before going on sale to the public on 30 October 2015. In just under eight hours of priority booking, 175,000 tickets were sold for the world premiere production. To meet the demand for tickets, the play's booking period was extended through January 2017. Upon tickets being made available to the general public, an extension was announced through 30 April 2017. On the same day, another extension was announced, this time through 27 May 2017.

On 20 December 2015, initial casting was announced with Jamie Parker playing Harry Potter, Noma Dumezweni playing Hermione Granger and Paul Thornley playing Ron Weasley. The casting of the dark-skinned Noma Dumezweni as Hermione sparked controversy, with Rowling responding that Hermione's skin was never specified as white. Further notable casting included Poppy Miller as Ginny Potter, Alex Price as Draco Malfoy, Sam Clemmett as Albus Potter and Anthony Boyle as Scorpius Malfoy. The original production featured an overall cast of 42 actors.

Previews for Harry Potter and the Cursed Child began at the Palace Theatre on 7 June 2016. The official opening night for the play was on 30 July 2016. The original cast played their final performances on 21 May 2017.

On 16 March 2020, performances were suspended because of the COVID-19 pandemic. Performances resumed on 14 October 2021, continuing as the original two-part production.

The original two-part production gave its final performance on 20 September 2026, and the play reopened at the Palace on 9 October 2026 in a one-part version, in line with productions elsewhere in the world. Its first company had Ethan Rouse as Albus Potter and Bill Stanley as Scorpius Malfoy, with Zoë Rainey as Ginny, Hasia Akwaboah as Rose and Adam Jackson-Smith as Draco; David Ricardo-Pearce, Thomas Aldridge and Naana Agyei Ampadu continued as Harry, Ron and Hermione.

=== Broadway (2018–present) ===
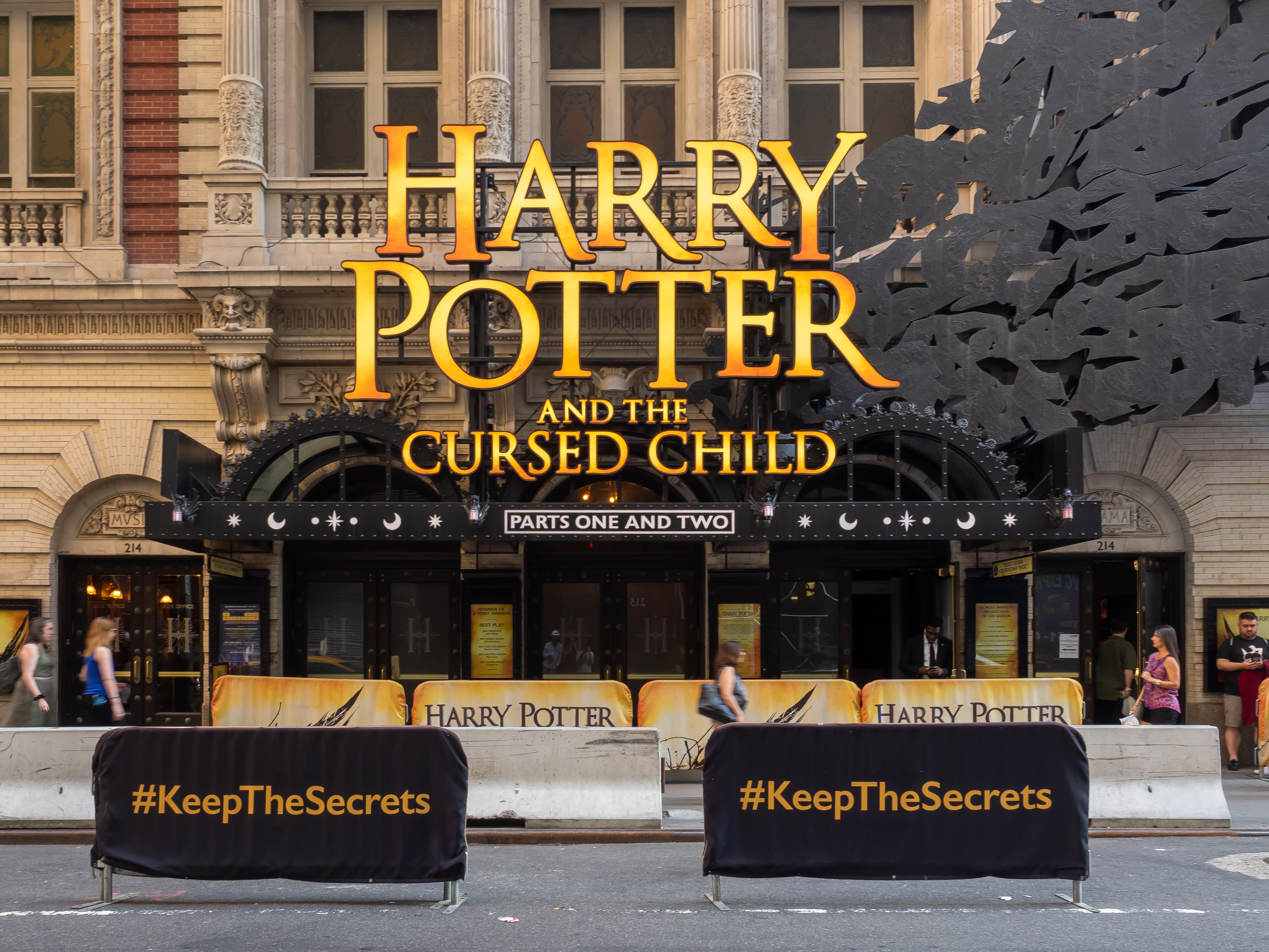
Marquee at the Lyric Theatre, July 2019

On 4 May 2017, it was announced that Harry Potter and the Cursed Child would premiere on Broadway at the Lyric Theatre. In preparation for the play, the Lyric Theatre underwent extensive renovations after its last show, the Cirque du Soleil musical Paramour, left the theatre, which included removing 400 seats from the auditorium and moved the entrance to West 43rd Street. The New York Times estimated that it was the most expensive non-musical Broadway play ever, incurring approximately $68 million in opening costs. Tickets initially went on sale on 18 October 2017.

On 2 August 2017, the original Broadway cast was announced. Each of the principal West End cast members transferred to Broadway, which included Jamie Parker (Harry Potter), Noma Dumezweni (Hermione Granger), Paul Thornley (Ron Weasley), Poppy Miller (Ginny Potter), Alex Price (Draco Malfoy), Sam Clemmett (Albus Potter), and Anthony Boyle (Scorpius Malfoy). The production began previews on 16 March 2018, before an official opening night on 22 April 2018.

In March 2019, the second-year cast was announced, which included James Snyder as Harry Potter, Jenny Jules as Hermione Granger, Matt Mueller as Ron Weasley, Diane Davis as Ginny Potter, Jonno Roberts as Draco Malfoy, Nicholas Podany as Albus Potter, Nadia Brown as Rose Granger-Weasley, and Bubba Weiler as Scorpius Malfoy.

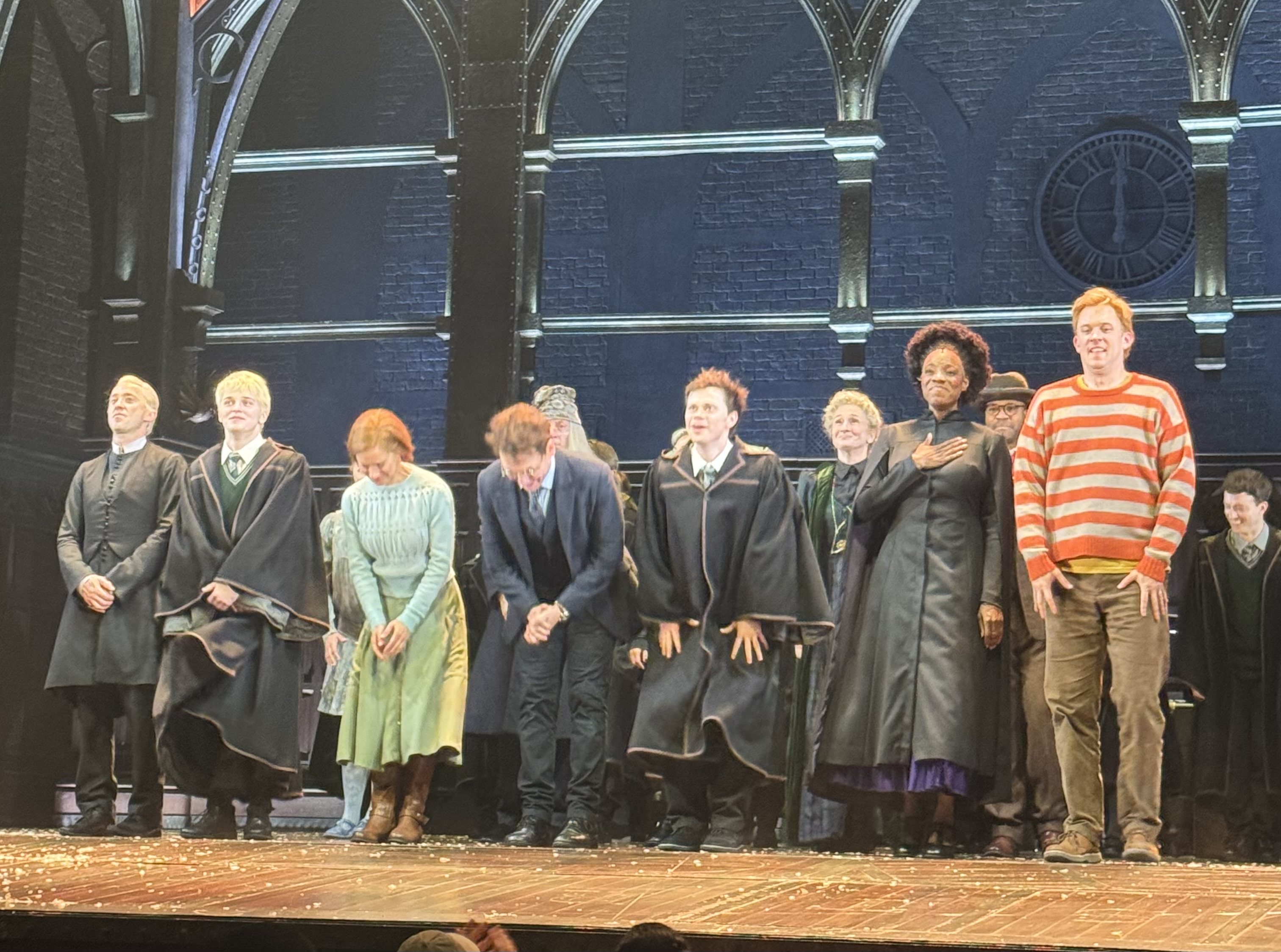
Tom Felton (first from left) with the Broadway cast of Cursed Child, July 2026

On 12 March 2020, performances were suspended due to the COVID-19 pandemic. The play re-opened on 12 November 2021, as the newly revised one-part version. In January 2022, Snyder was fired from the production following a misconduct investigation that arose from a complaint raised by Davis, who portrayed Ginny Potter. The play holds the record for the highest weekly gross by a non-musical play in Broadway history, grossing $2,718,487 for the eight-performance week ending 31 December 2023.

The Broadway production adopted additional revisions on 12 November 2024, further reducing the play's runtime to under three hours. This shortened play is the same version that debuted earlier that fall in Chicago at the start of the national tour.

In November 2025, Tom Felton began reprising his film role as Draco Malfoy in the Broadway production. He is still playing the role full-time as of August 2026. Felton was originally scheduled to remain in the show until 10 May 2026, but due to popular demand and praise for his role, he extended his schedule until 1 November of that year and again through 3 January 2027. Since his arrival, the show's grosses have more than doubled, rising from $1.3 million the week before he joined to $2.6 million over his first seven performances. As of 2025, the play, produced by Sonia Friedman and Colin Callender, was considered the most financially successful drama in Broadway history, with grosses of over $444 million.

Rupert Grint has been announced to reprise his film role of Ron Weasley for a 17-week engagement scheduled to run from 2 February to 30 May 2027.

=== Melbourne (2019–2023) ===
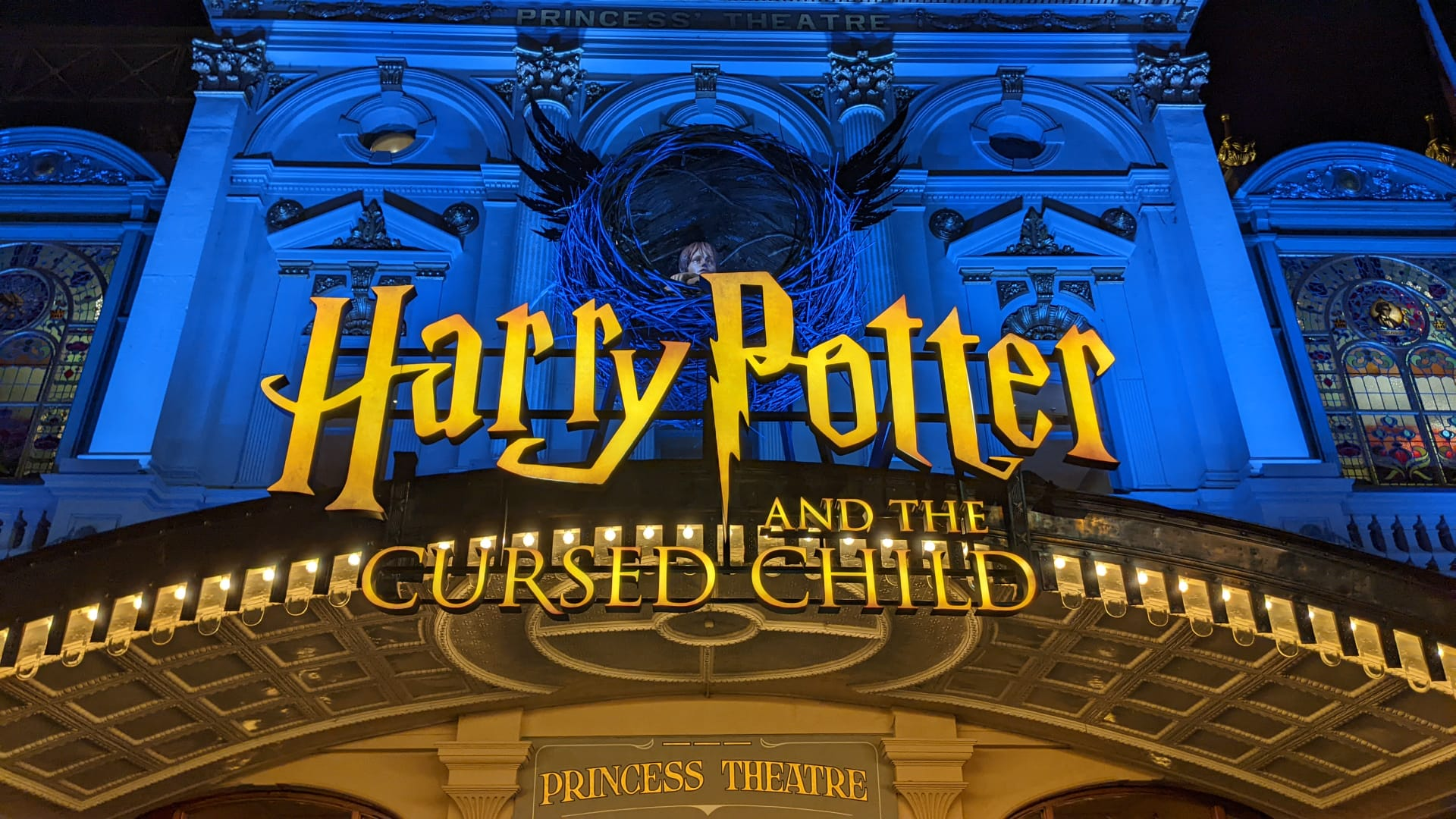
Marquee at the Princess Theatre, July 2022

On 24 October 2017, it was announced that Harry Potter and the Cursed Child would make its Australian premiere at the Princess Theatre in Melbourne. In anticipation of the play, the Princess Theatre underwent an estimated $6.5 million renovation to create a more immersive "magical" and theatrical experience for the audience. Presale tickets were released on 2 August 2018, selling more than 200,000 tickets in just four days, before the public sale tickets were released.

On 2 September 2018, the cast was announced. It starred Gareth Reeves as Harry Potter, Paula Arundell as Hermione Granger, Gyton Grantley as Ron Weasley, Lucy Goleby as Ginny Potter, Eva Rees as Albus Potter, Tom Wren as Draco Malfoy, and William McKenna as Scorpius Malfoy.

Performances began on 18 January 2019, ahead of an official opening night on 23 February 2019. However, on 16 March 2020, performances were suspended due to the COVID-19 pandemic. Performances resumed on 25 February 2021. Most of the original principal cast members returned, with Ben Walter joining the show as Albus Potter and Aisha Aidara joining as Rose Granger-Weasley.

On 27 March 2022, the final performance of the original two-part play was performed in Melbourne. Following a brief hiatus, the play reopened on 4 May 2022, as the newly staged one-part version. The lone notable cast change was Lachlan Woods joining the cast as Draco Malfoy.

The Melbourne production closed on 9 July 2023, after approximately 1,300 performances. It set records as Australia's longest-running stage play and the best-selling, with over one million tickets sold.

=== San Francisco (2019–2022) ===
On 28 June 2018, it was announced that the play would open at the Curran Theatre in San Francisco, California, marking the second production of the play in the United States. Tickets went on sale in March 2019, with the demand crashing the ticketing systems. For the week ending Sunday, 29 December 2019, the production grossed $2,096,686 setting a record for the highest-grossing week for a play in San Francisco history.

On 2 August 2019, the cast was announced and starred John Skelley as Harry Potter, Yanna McIntosh as Hermione Granger, David Abeles as Ron Weasley, Angela Reed as Ginny Potter, Lucas Hall as Draco Malfoy. Rounding out the lead cast was Benjamin Papac as Albus Potter, Jon Steiger as Scorpius Malfoy, and Folami Williams as Rose Granger-Weasley. Preview performances began on 23 October 2019, ahead of an official opening night on 1 December 2019.

In response to the emergence of the COVID-19 pandemic, it was announced that the Curran Theatre would be temporarily reducing its capacity to 1,000 patrons. However, on 11 March 2020, it was announced that all performances were suspended because of the COVID-19 pandemic. On 9 February 2022, the play reopened, this time as the newly staged one-part version. Most of the lead cast members reprised their roles, alongside new cast members Steve O'Connell as Ron Weasley, Lily Mojekwu as Hermione Granger, and Abbi Hawk as Ginny Potter.

The San Francisco production of Harry Potter and the Cursed Child closed on 11 September 2022, following 393 performances.

=== Hamburg (2021–2023) ===
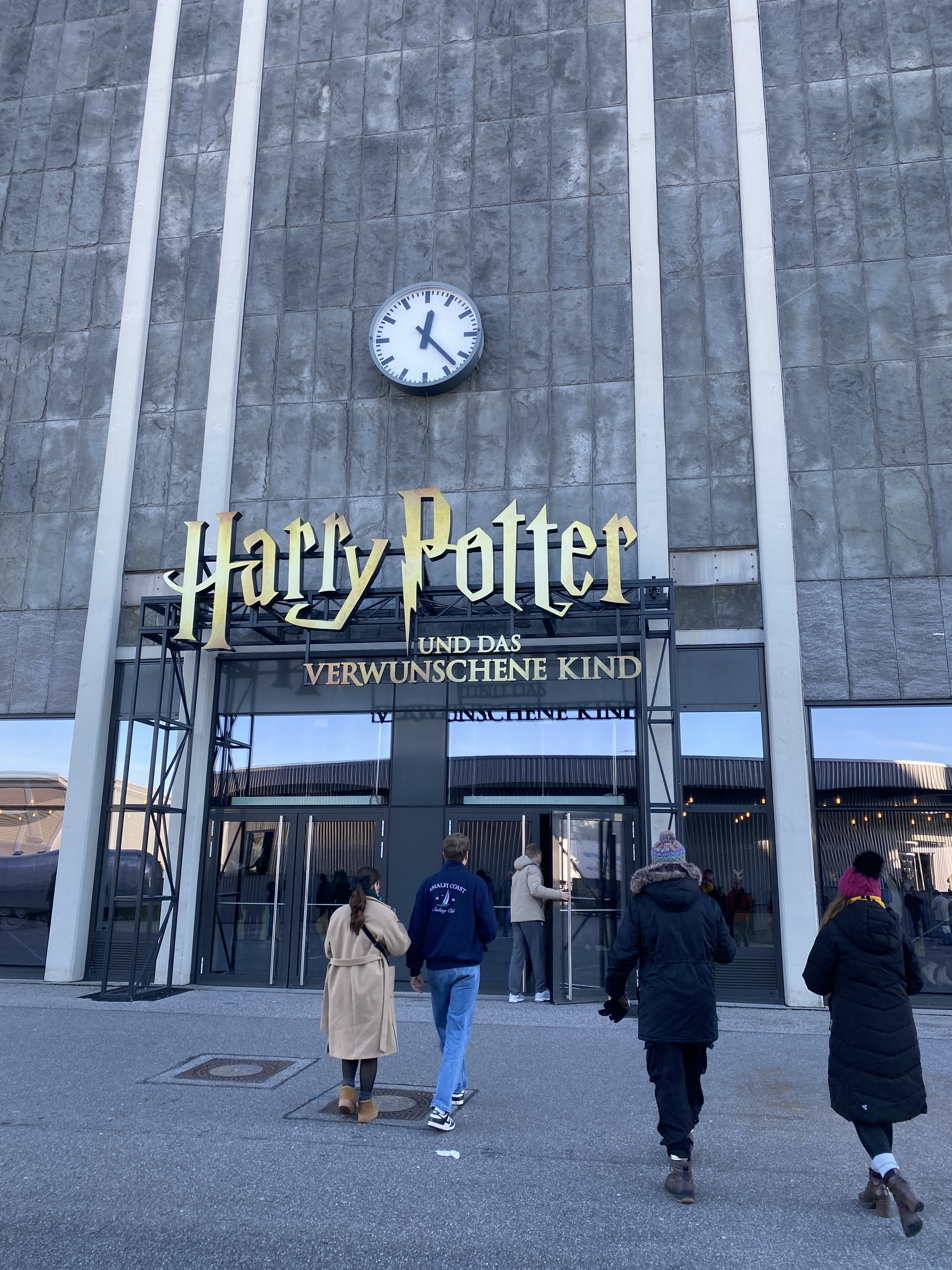
Marquee at the Mehr! Theater, December 2024

On 5 July 2018, it was announced that the play would make its German premiere at the Mehr! Theater in Hamburg. Titled Harry Potter und das verwunschene Kind ("Harry Potter and the enchanted child"), this marked the first production of the play translated into a different language. The two-part play was originally scheduled to open on 13 March 2020, but was postponed due to the COVID-19 pandemic.

Pre-sale tickets for the play began on 25 March 2019. Extensive renovations for the German production began in May 2019, at an estimated cost of 42 million euros. The cast included Markus Schöttl as Harry Potter, Sebastian Witt as Ron Weasley, Jillian Anthony as Hermione Granger, Sarah Schütz as Ginny Weasley, and Alen Hodzovic as Draco Malfoy. The cast also included Vincent Lang as Albus Potter, Mathias Reiser as Scorpius Malfoy, and Madina Frey as Rose Granger-Weasley.

The German production opened on 5 December 2021. On 8 January 2023, the final performances of the two-part version of the play were performed in Hamburg. The play re-opened on 9 February 2023, as the revised one-part play.

=== Toronto (2022–2023) ===
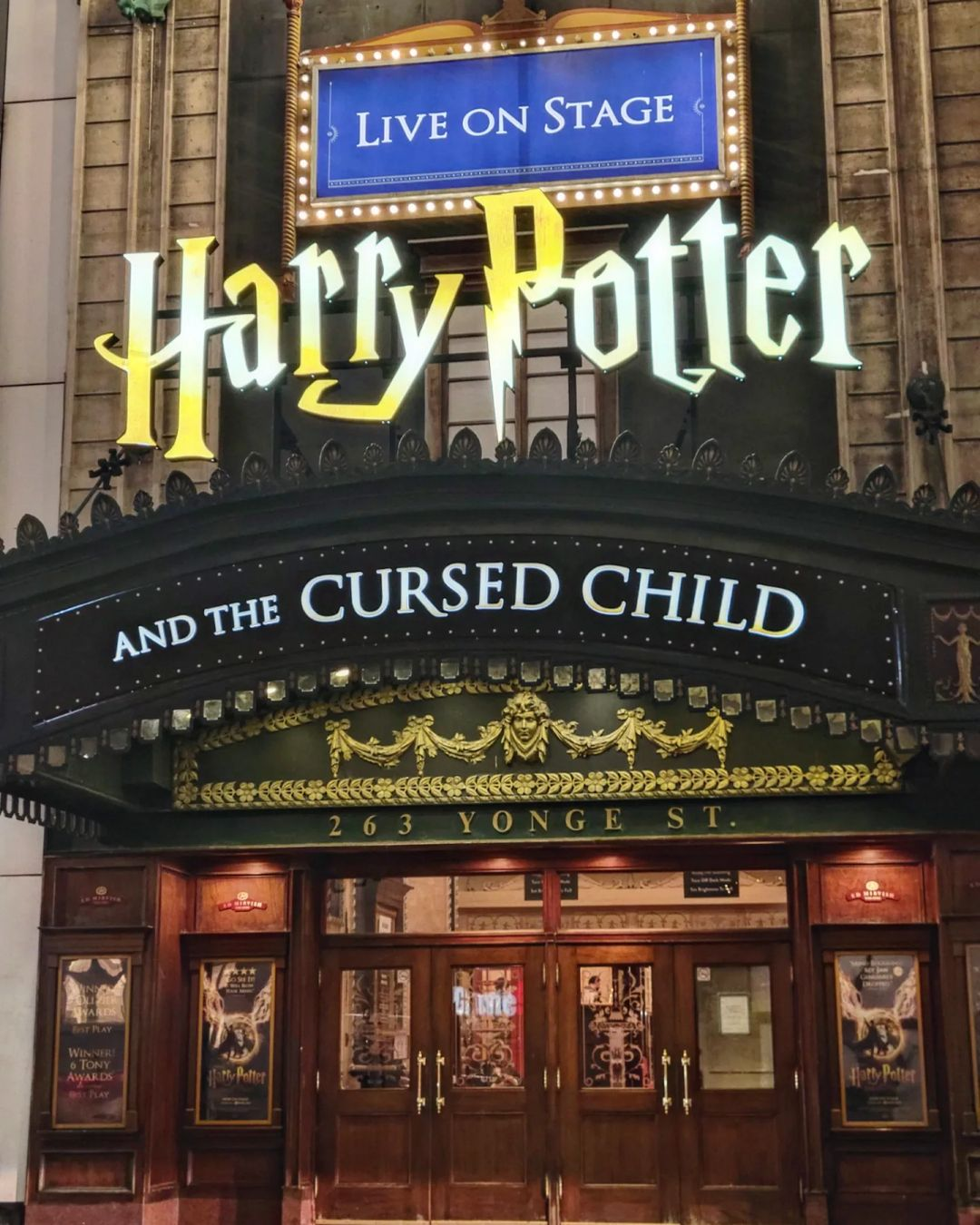
Marquee at the Ed Mirvish Theatre, June 2022

On 22 May 2019, it was announced that Harry Potter and the Cursed Child would make its Canadian premiere at the Ed Mirvish Theatre in Toronto. The two-part play was scheduled to open in autumn 2020, but was delayed due to the COVID-19 pandemic.

On 28 August 2021, it was announced that the production would make its Canadian premiere on 31 May 2022 as the newly staged one-part version. The Ed Mirvish Theatre underwent significant renovations, which cost an estimated $5 million. The renovations transformed the lobby areas and the auditorium to immerse the audience once they enter the theatre, and to provide audiences with a "more magical space".

The Canadian cast was announced on 19 October 2021 and included Trevor White as Harry Potter, Gregory Prest as Ron Weasley, Sarah Afful as Hermione Granger, Trish Lindstrom as Ginny Potter, and Brad Hodder as Draco Malfoy. Other lead cast members included Luke Kimball as Albus Potter, Hailey Alexis Lewis as Rose Granger-Weasley, and Thomas Mitchell Barnet as Scorpius Malfoy.

The production began previews on 31 May 2022, with an official opening night on 19 June 2022. The play set a Canadian weekly box office record for a non-musical play, grossing an estimated $2 million in sales.

The Toronto production closed on 2 July 2023, after approximately 444 performances. It set a record for the longest running professional play in Canadian history.

=== Tokyo (2022–2026) ===
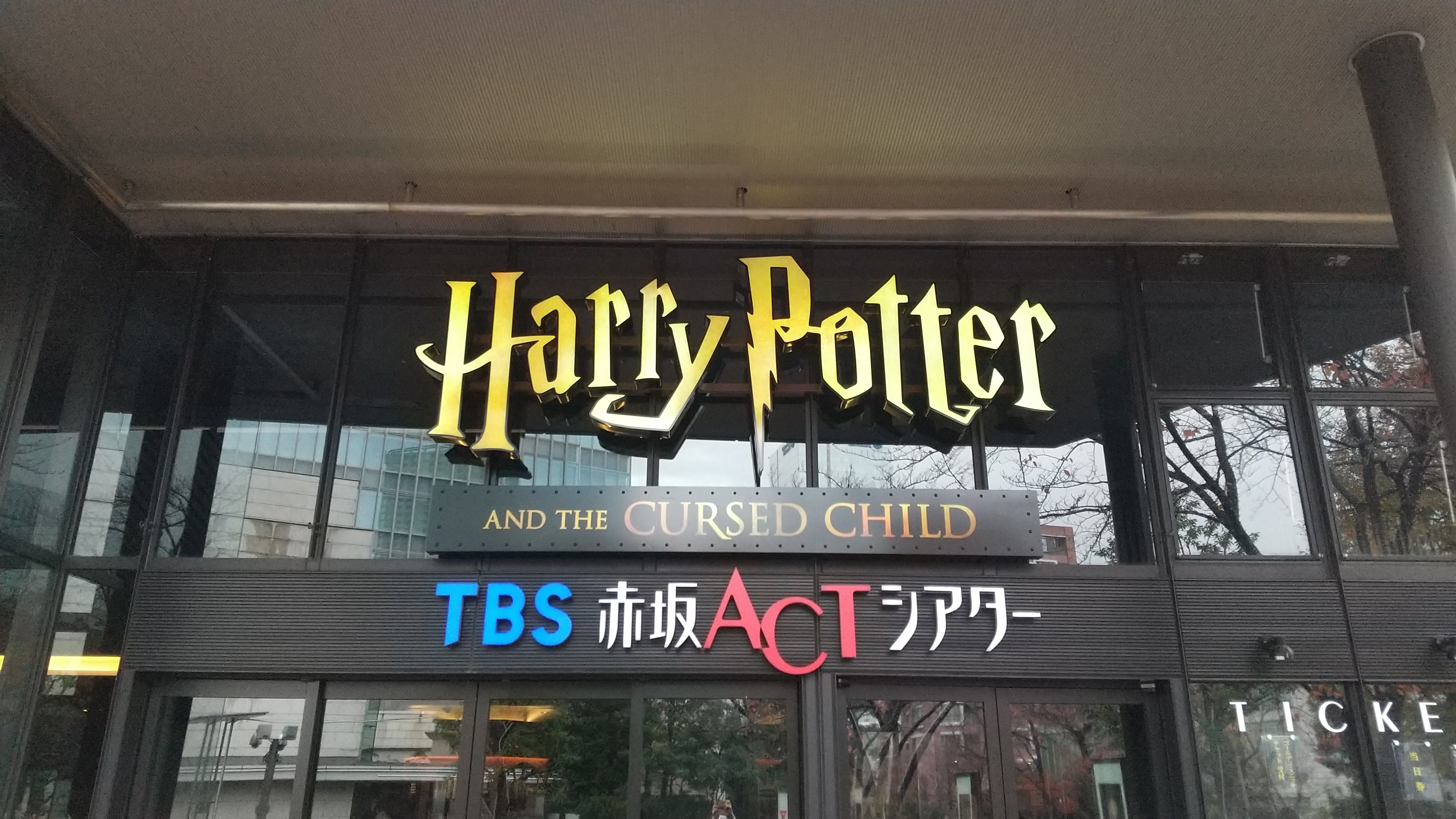
Marquee at the TBS Akasaka ACT Theater, November 2022

On 13 February 2020, it was announced that the production would have its Asian premiere at the TBS Akasaka ACT Theater in Tokyo, Japan. Renovations of the TBS Akasaka ACT Theater began in 2021, which was being re-designed to be "a site-specific venue for Harry Potter and the Cursed Child", and would re-open in time for the theatre's 70th anniversary.

The cast for the Tokyo production was announced on 26 January 2022, and would include multiple actors splitting each of the lead roles. The cast starred Tatsuya Fujiwara, Kanji Ishimaru, and Osamu Mukai sharing the role of Harry Potter, Masahiro Ehara and Hayata Tateyama as Ron Weasley, Aoi Nakabeppu and Seina Sagiri as Hermione Granger, Erika Mabuchi and Yuri Shirahane as Ginny Weasley, and Shinya Matsuda and Syuntaro Miyao as Draco Malfoy. Additionally, the cast included Haru Fujita and Kouhei Fukuyama as Albus Potter, and Soudai Kadota and Rio Saitou as Scorpius Malfoy.

The production began previews on 16 June 2022, and had their opening night on 8 July 2022.

On 27 February 2025, it was announced that Goro Inagaki would take over the role of Harry Potter for the play's fourth year, starting in July.

=== Brazil ===
In late 2024, it was announced that there would be a Brazilian production of the play, with performances in Portuguese, set to start in 2025 in São Paulo's Teatro Renault - marking the first time it would be staged in Latin America.

In March 2025, though, it was announced that production would be halted and that plans were cancelled due to, according to a producer, lack of investment and sponsorship, indicating the production would be too costly for Brazilian markets to risk in.

Auditions had already been ongoing, and some performers had already been chosen, such as Hugo Bonemer as Harry Potter, Adriana Lessa as Hermione Granger and Arthur Berges as Rony Weasley. Bonemer later revealed he only knew he had been cast when the production was halted, citing his frustration.

=== North American tour (2024–2026) ===
On 16 October 2023, it was announced that a North American tour of the play will begin in September 2024 in Chicago. The tour would mark the first time that the production has embarked on a tour.

Harry Potter and the Cursed Child began its first North America tour in Chicago at the James M. Nederlander Theatre on 10 September 2024. Running until at least July 2026, the production condenses the original two-part play into one, lasting about two hours and 50 minutes.

Production	Venue	Opening night	Closing night	Notes
Chicago	James M. Nederlander Theatre	10 September 2024	1 February 2025	
Los Angeles	Hollywood Pantages Theatre	15 February 2025	22 June 2025	
Washington, D.C.	National Theatre	8 July 2025	31 August 2025	
Providence	Providence PAC	19 September 2025	4 October 2025	
Columbus, OH	Ohio Theatre	12 October 2025	26 October 2025	Performances scheduled from 28 October to 1 November were canceled due to unforeseen circumstances.
Boston	Emerson Colonial Theatre	9 November 2025	20 December 2025	
Durham, NC	DPAC	28 December 2025	17 January 2026	
Orlando	Dr. Phillips Center	24 January 2026	21 February 2026	
Atlanta	The Fox Theatre	28 February 2026	21 March 2026	
St. Louis	The Fabulous Fox Theatre	28 March 2026	18 April 2026	
Minneapolis	The Orpheum Theatre	25 April 2026	23 May 2026	
Denver	Buell Theatre	30 May 2026	27 June 2026	
Costa Mesa	Segerstrom Center	5 July 2026	25 July 2026	
Seattle	Paramount Theatre	22 August 2026	12 Sep 2026	

=== Harry Potter and the Cursed Child School Editions ===
In fall 2024, a High School and Secondary School Edition of Harry Potter and the Cursed Child was created, tailored for school theatre productions. This special adaptation premiered in the UK at the Riverside School, Barking; in Canada at St. Joseph's Catholic High School, St Thomas, Ontario; and in the U.S. at Hoboken High School, A production was later mounted at Brighton College in January 2025

=== The Hague (2026) ===
On 12 December 2024, it was announced that Harry Potter and the Cursed Child will open in the Netherlands in 2026, with performances in Dutch as the one-part version. The production premiered on 14 March 2026, after previews started on 3 March 2026.

== Cast and principal roles ==
Role	West End	Broadway	Melbourne	San Francisco	Hamburg	Toronto	Tokyo	North American tour	The Hague
Role	2016	2018	2019		2020	2022	2022–2025	2024	2026
Harry Potter	Jamie Parker	Jamie Parker	Gareth Reeves	John Skelley	Markus Schöttl	Trevor White	Tatsuya Fujiwara; Kanji Ishimaru; Osamu Mukai; Goro Inagaki	John Skelley	Valentijn van Hall
Hermione Granger	Noma Dumezweni	Noma Dumezweni	Paula Arundell	Yanna McIntosh	Jillian Anthony	Sarah Afful	Aoi Nakabeppu; Seina Sagiri	Ebony Blake	Carolina Dijkhuizen (Note: Initially, Joy Wielkens was announced to play Hermione in The Hague, but she left the production after getting offered a role in Hadestown in the West End. Dijkhuizen took over the role.)
Ron Weasley	Paul Thornley	Paul Thornley	Gyton Grantley	David Abeles	Sebastian Witt	Gregory Prest	Masahiro Ehara; Hayata Tateyama	Matt Mueller	Hayo de Kruijf
Ginny Potter	Poppy Miller	Poppy Miller	Lucy Goleby	Angela Reed	Sarah Schütz	Trish Lindstrom	Erika Mabuchi; Yuri Shirahane	Trish Lindstrom	Kilke John
Draco Malfoy	Alex Price	Alex Price	Tom Wren	Lucas Hall	Alen Hodzovic	Brad Hodder	Shinya Matsuda; Syuntaro Miyao	Benjamin Thys	Ewout Heijbroek
Albus Severus Potter	Sam Clemmett	Sam Clemmett	Eva Rees	Benjamin Papac	Vincent Lang	Luke Kimball	Haru Fujita; Kouhei Fukuyama	Emmet Smith	Ward van Klinken
Scorpius Malfoy	Anthony Boyle	Anthony Boyle	William McKenna	Jon Steiger	Mathias Reiser	Thomas Mitchell Barnet	Soudai Kadota; Rio Saitou	Aidan Close	Jary Sluijter
Rose Granger-Weasley	Cherrelle Skeete	Susan Heyward	Manali Datar	Folami Williams	Madina Frey	Hailey Lewis	Natsumi Hashimoto	Naiya Vanessa McCalla	Lakshmi Gajadin
Delphi Diggory	Esther Smith	Jessie Fisher	Madeleine Jones	Emily Juliette Murphy	Kristina-Maria Peters	Sara Farb	Sayuri Houi; Karen Iwata	Julia Nightingale	Lotte Pierik
Cedric Diggory / James Sirius Potter / James Potter Sr.	Tom Milligan	Benjamin Wheelwright	David Simes	William Bednar-Carter	Felix Radcke	Lucas Meeuse	Kazuma Chiba	Caleb Hafen	Pim Lether
Craig Bowker Jr.	Jeremy Ang Jones	Joshua DeJesus	Slone Sudiro	Irving Dyson Jr.	Robin Cadet	Michael Chiem	Yuuma Okabe	Timmy Thompson	Amon Bergen
Yann Fredericks	Jenet Le Lacheur	Jess Barbagallo	Connor Sweeney	Corey Hedy	Christian Bock	Bryce Fletch	Masato Watanabe	David Fine	Juul van de Laar
Station Master	Adam McNamara	David Abeles	Hayden Spencer	Steve O'Connell	Frank Brunet	Mark Crawford	Kunihiro Kawabe	René Thornton Jr.	Joost van der Aa
Amos Diggory / Albus Dumbledore	Barry McCarthy	Edward James Hyland	George Henare	Charles Janasz	Fritz Hille	Steven Sutcliffe	Kiichi Fukui	Larry Yando	Dick Cohen
Severus Snape	Paul Bentall	Byron Jennings	David Ross Patterson	Andrew Long	Uwe Serafin	Steven Sutcliffe	Kiichi Fukui	Larry Yando	Dick Cohen
Lord Voldemort	Paul Bentall	Byron Jennings	David Ross Patterson	Andrew Long	Uwe Serafin	Shawn Wright	Masashi Shinohara	Nathan Hosner	Mick Westerhout
Vernon Dursley	Paul Bentall	Byron Jennings	David Ross Patterson	Andrew Long	Uwe Serafin	—N/a	—N/a	—N/a	—N/a
Bane	Nuno Silva	David St. Louis	Iopu Auva'a	Logan James Hall	Fernando Spengler	Kaleb Alexander	Masami Koba	—N/a	—N/a
Sorting Hat	Chris Jarman	Brian Abraham	Soren Jensen	Julian Rozzell Jr.	Hans-Jürgen Helsig	Kaleb Alexander	Masami Koba	—N/a	Denzel Ndongosi
Hagrid	Chris Jarman	Brian Abraham	Soren Jensen	Julian Rozzell Jr.	Hans-Jürgen Helsig	—N/a	—N/a	—N/a	—N/a
Moaning Myrtle / Lily Potter Sr.	Alby Baldwin	Lauren Nicole Cipoletti	Gillian Cosgriff	Brittany Zeinstra	Glenna Weber	Katie Ryerson	Karen Miyama	MacKenzie Lesser-Roy	Sem Gerritsma
Polly Chapman	Claudia Grant	Madeline Weinstein	Jessica Vickers	Lauren Zakrin	Felicitas Bauer	Katie Ryerson	Karen Miyama	Julianna Austin	Jill Tjin-Asjoe
Trolley Witch	Sandy McDade	Geraldine Hughes	Debra Lawrance	Katherine Leask	Heidi Jürgens	Raquel Duffy	Natsuko Yakumaru	Maren Searle	Saskia Egtberts
Minerva McGonagall	Sandy McDade	Geraldine Hughes	Debra Lawrance	Shannon Cochran	Anita Maria Gramser	Fiona Reid	Ikue Sakakibara; Hitomi Takahashi	Katherine Leask	Anne-Marie Jung
Dolores Umbridge	Helena Lymbery	Kathryn Meisle	Hannah Waterman	Katherine Leask	Heidi Jürgens	Fiona Reid	Ikue Sakakibara; Hitomi Takahashi	Katherine Leask	Anne-Marie Jung
Petunia Dursley	Helena Lymbery	Kathryn Meisle	Hannah Waterman	Katherine Leask	Heidi Jürgens	—N/a	—N/a	—N/a	—N/a
Madam Hooch	Helena Lymbery	Kathryn Meisle	Hannah Waterman	Theo Allyn	Michaela Schmid	Yemie Sonuga	Minako Maehigashi	Alexis Gordon	Djin Kastje
Dudley Dursley	Jack North	Joey LaBrasca	Hamish Johnston	Tuck Sweeney	Nicolai Schwab	—N/a	—N/a	—N/a	—N/a
Karl Jenkins	Jack North	Joey LaBrasca	Hamish Johnston	Tuck Sweeney	Nicolai Schwab	—N/a	Toshiaki Komatsu	Zach Norton	Bjurre Potters
Viktor Krum	Jack North	Joey LaBrasca	Connor Sweeney	Tuck Sweeney	Nicolai Schwab	—N/a	Toshiaki Komatsu	Zach Norton	Bjurre Potters
Young Harry Potter	Rudi Goodman; Alfred Jones; Bili Keogh; Ewan Rutherford; Nathaniel Smith; Dylan Standen	Will Coombs; Landon Maas	Alfie Hughes; Ezra Justin; Archie Pitcher; Zakaria Rahhali	Elijah Cooper; Tyler Patrick Hennessy	Marko Schimanowski	—N/a	Masato Watanabe	—N/a	—N/a
Lily Luna Potter	Zoe Brough; Cristina Fray; Christiana Hutchings	Olivia Bond; Brooklyn Shuck	Sasha Turinui; Ruby Hall; Sienna Conti	Natalia Bingham; Natalie Schroeder	Annika Menden	—N/a	—N/a	—N/a	—N/a

=== London replacements ===
- Harry Potter: Jamie Glover
- Ron Weasley: Thomas Aldridge (2017-2026)
- Hermione Granger: Rakie Ayola, Michelle Gayle, Franc Ashman
- Ginny Potter: Emma Lowndes
- Scorpius Malfoy: Samuel Blenkin

=== New York replacements ===
- Harry Potter: James Snyder, Matthew James Thomas
- Hermione Granger: Jenny Jules
- Ron Weasley: David Abeles, Rupert Grint
- Draco Malfoy: Tom Felton
- Ginny Potter: Erica Sweany
- Albus Potter: Nicholas Podany

== Script publication ==
=== Editions ===
Harry Potter and the Cursed Child
- Special Rehearsal Edition cover
- Author: Jack Thorne (script & story); J. K. Rowling (story); John Tiffany (story)
- Series: Harry Potter
- Genre: Fantasy, Drama
- Published: 31 July 2016 (Special Rehearsal Edition); 25 July 2017 (Definitive Collector's Edition)
- Publisher: Little, Brown and Company (international); Scholastic (US/Canada); Pottermore (digital)
- Publication date: 31 July 2016
- Publication place: United Kingdom
- Pages: 328 (Special Rehearsal Edition); 321 (Definitive Collector's Edition)
- ISBN: 978-1-338-09913-3 (US); 978-0-7515-6535-5 (UK)

Both parts of the stage play's script have been released in print and digital formats as Harry Potter and the Cursed Child – Parts One and Two.

The first edition, the Special Rehearsal Edition, corresponded to the script used in the preview shows and was published on 31 July 2016, the date of Harry's birthday in the series and Rowling's birthday, as well, including some midnight release events. Since revisions to the script continued after the book was printed, an edited version was released on 25 July 2017, as the "Definitive Collector's Edition". According to CNN, this was the most preordered book of 2016.

=== Sales ===
In the United States and Canada, the book sold over 2 million copies in its first two days of release. 847,885 copies were sold during the book's first week of release in the United Kingdom. By June 2017, the book had sold over 4.5 million copies in the United States.

== Critical reception ==
Harry Potter and the Cursed Child has received a range of reviews from critics. Some audiences and critics have complimented the casting and performances, while many debate the quality of the piece and how it compares to entries in the main Harry Potter series.

Publications awarding five-star ratings included The Independent, the London Evening Standard, The Stage, and WhatsOnStage. The Telegraph also gave five, although "there are some quibbles", while The Guardian's Michael Billington awarded four stars.

Anthony Boyle's performance as Scorpius Malfoy garnered particular acclaim. WhatsOnStage wrote that "Boyle gives a career-making performance", while The Wall Street Journal described him as "the break-out performance". Variety's critic, Matt Trueman, agreed, writing, "it's Boyle who really stands out", and both Trueman and Henry Hitchings, in the Evening Standard, noted that his performance was sure to be a fan favourite.

=== Response within the Harry Potter fandom ===
The play was met with a polarised response from the Harry Potter fandom. Fans responded positively to the play's production values and characters, with Scorpius Malfoy being particularly popular. Some fans commented that the dialogue between the familiar characters was "spot on". Others have noted that the play sheds light on some of the relationships between the characters, such as Harry and Dumbledore's. The response had been particularly positive among fans who watched the play on stage.

In response to the play's book-form publication, some fans said its story seemed more "like a work of fan fiction" and said that it diverged from previously established rules of the universe, criticising the script's characterisation. Some also took issue with the style and plot of the script, complaining that the Time-Turner storylines had already been used, as had Cedric Diggory's death, and that the writers were rehashing old storylines and over-played tropes of the fantasy/sci-fi genre. There are debates within the fandom about whether the story should be considered canon, and whether it contradicts how concepts such as time travel worked in the books. Rowling has stated that the play should be considered canon.

=== Queerbaiting accusations ===
The stage play's "ambiguously gay" portrayal of the male friendship between Albus Potter and Scorpius Malfoy has been criticized as an example of "queerbaiting", with director John Tiffany stating his belief that it "would not [have] been appropriate" for The Cursed Child to directly address the characters' sexualities.

== Awards and nominations ==
=== Original London production ===
Year	Award	Category	Nominee	Result
2016	Evening Standard Theatre Award	Best Play		Won
2016	Evening Standard Theatre Award	Best Director	John Tiffany	Nominated
2016	Evening Standard Theatre Award	Best Design	Christine Jones	Nominated
2016	Evening Standard Theatre Award	Emerging Talent Award	Anthony Boyle	Nominated
2016	Critics' Circle Theatre Award	Best Director	John Tiffany	Won
2016	Critics' Circle Theatre Award	Best Designer	Christine Jones	Won
2016	Critics' Circle Theatre Award	Most Promising Newcomer	Anthony Boyle	Won
2017	South Bank Sky Arts Awards	Theatre Award		Won
2017	WhatsOnStage Award	Best New Play		Won
2017	WhatsOnStage Award	Best Actor in a Play	Jamie Parker	Won
2017	WhatsOnStage Award	Best Supporting Actor in a Play	Anthony Boyle	Won
2017	WhatsOnStage Award	Best Supporting Actor in a Play	Paul Thornley	Nominated
2017	WhatsOnStage Award	Best Supporting Actress in a Play	Poppy Miller	Nominated
2017	WhatsOnStage Award	Best Supporting Actress in a Play	Noma Dumezweni	Won
2017	WhatsOnStage Award	Best Direction	John Tiffany	Won
2017	WhatsOnStage Award	Best Costume Design	[[Katrina Lindsay]]	Nominated
2017	WhatsOnStage Award	Best Set Design	Christine Jones	Won
2017	WhatsOnStage Award	Best Lighting Design	Neil Austin	Won
2017	WhatsOnStage Award	Best Video Design	Finn Ross and Ash Woodward	Won
2017	Laurence Olivier Award	Best New Play		Won
2017	Laurence Olivier Award	Best Director	John Tiffany	Won
2017	Laurence Olivier Award	Best Actor	Jamie Parker	Won
2017	Laurence Olivier Award	Best Actress in a Supporting Role	Noma Dumezweni	Won
2017	Laurence Olivier Award	Best Actor in a Supporting Role	Anthony Boyle	Won
2017	Laurence Olivier Award	Best Costume Design	Katrina Lindsay	Won
2017	Laurence Olivier Award	Best Set Design	Christine Jones	Won
2017	Laurence Olivier Award	Best Sound Design	Gareth Fry	Won
2017	Laurence Olivier Award	Best Lighting Design	Neil Austin	Won
2017	Laurence Olivier Award	Best Theatre Choreographer	Steven Hoggett	Nominated
2017	Laurence Olivier Award	Outstanding Achievement in Music	Imogen Heap	Nominated
2017	School Travel Awards	Best Theatre Production for Schools		Won
2018	WhatsOnStage Award	Best West End Show		Won
2018	WhatsOnStage Award	Best Show Poster		Won

=== Original New York production ===
Year	Award	Category	Nominee	Result	Ref.
2018	Tony Awards	Best Play		Won	
2018	Tony Awards	Best Actor in a Play	Jamie Parker	Nominated	
2018	Tony Awards	Best Featured Actor in a Play	Anthony Boyle	Nominated	
2018	Tony Awards	Best Featured Actress in a Play	Noma Dumezweni	Nominated	
2018	Tony Awards	Best Direction of a Play	John Tiffany	Won	
2018	Tony Awards	Best Choreography	Steven Hoggett	Nominated	
2018	Tony Awards	Best Scenic Design in a Play	Christine Jones	Won	
2018	Tony Awards	Best Costume Design in a Play	Katrina Lindsay	Won	
2018	Tony Awards	Best Lighting Design in a Play	Neil Austin	Won	
2018	Tony Awards	Best Sound Design in a Play	Gareth Fry	Won	
2018	Drama Desk Awards	Outstanding Featured Actor in a Play	Anthony Boyle	Nominated	
2018	Drama Desk Awards	Outstanding Director of a Play	John Tiffany	Won	
2018	Drama Desk Awards	Outstanding Music in a Play	Imogen Heap	Won	
2018	Drama Desk Awards	Outstanding Costume Design for a Play	Katrina Lindsay	Nominated	
2018	Drama Desk Awards	Outstanding Lighting Design for a Play	Neil Austin	Won	
2018	Drama Desk Awards	Outstanding Projection Design	Finn Ross and Ash Woodward	Won	
2018	Drama Desk Awards	Outstanding Sound Design in a Play	Gareth Fry	Won	
2018	Drama Desk Awards	Outstanding Wig and Hair Design	Carole Hancock	Nominated	
2018	Outer Critics Circle Awards	Outstanding New Broadway Play		Won	
2018	Outer Critics Circle Awards	Outstanding Featured Actor in a Play	Anthony Boyle	Nominated	
2018	Outer Critics Circle Awards	Outstanding New Score (Broadway or Off-Broadway)	Imogen Heap	Nominated	
2018	Outer Critics Circle Awards	Outstanding Director of a Play	John Tiffany	Won	
2018	Outer Critics Circle Awards	Outstanding Choreographer	Steven Hoggett	Nominated	
2018	Outer Critics Circle Awards	Outstanding Scenic Design (Play or Musical)	Christine Jones	Won	
2018	Outer Critics Circle Awards	Outstanding Costume Design (Play or Musical)	Katrina Lindsay	Nominated	
2018	Outer Critics Circle Awards	Outstanding Lighting Design (Play or Musical)	Neil Austin	Won	
2018	Outer Critics Circle Awards	Outstanding Projection Design (Play or Musical)	Finn Ross and Ash Woodward	Won	
2018	Outer Critics Circle Awards	Outstanding Sound Design (Play or Musical)	Gareth Fry	Won	
2018	Drama League Awards	Outstanding Production of a Broadway or Off-Broadway Play		Won	
2018	Drama League Awards	Distinguished Performance Award	Anthony Boyle	Nominated	
2018	Drama League Awards	Distinguished Performance Award	Noma Dumezweni	Nominated	
2018	New York Drama Critics' Circle Awards	Special Citation (Staging, design and illusions)		Honoured	
2020	Grammy Award	Best Musical Theater Album	Imogen Heap (producer & composer)	Nominated	

=== Original Melbourne production ===
Year	Award	Category	Nominee	Result	Ref.
2019	Helpmann Awards	Best Play		Nominated	
2019	Helpmann Awards	Best Male Actor in a Play	William McKenna	Nominated	
2019	Helpmann Awards	Best Female Actor in a Play	Paula Arundell	Nominated	
2019	Helpmann Awards	Best Original Score	Imogen Heap	Nominated	
2019	Helpmann Awards	Best Scenic Design	Christine Jones	Nominated	
2019	Helpmann Awards	Best Costume Design	Katrina Lindsay	Nominated	
2019	Helpmann Awards	Best Lighting Design	Neil Austin	Won	
2019	Helpmann Awards	Best Sound Design	Gareth Fry	Nominated	

=== Original Toronto production ===
Year	Award	Category	Nominee	Result	Ref.
2022	Dora Awards	Outstanding General Theatre Production		Nominated	
2022	Dora Awards	Outstanding Performance in a Featured Role	Gregory Prest	Nominated	
2022	Dora Awards	Outstanding Performance in a Featured Role	Sarah Afful	Nominated	
2022	Dora Awards	Outstanding Direction	John Tiffany	Nominated	
2022	Dora Awards	Outstanding Sound Design/Composition	Imogen Heap and Gareth Fry	Nominated	
2022	Dora Awards	Outstanding Scenic/Projection Design	Christine Jones, Finn Ross and Ash J. Woodward	Nominated	
2022	Dora Awards	Outstanding Costume Design	Katrina Lindsay	Nominated	
2022	Dora Awards	Outstanding Lighting Design	Neil Austin	Won	

=== Original Hamburg production ===
Year	Award	Category	Nominee	Result
2021	German Live Entertainment Award	Show of the Year		Won
2024	BroadwayWorld Germany Awards	Best Performer in a Play	Alen Hodzovic	Won

=== Original Tokyo production ===
Year	Award	Category	Nominee	Result
2022	Yomiuri Theatre Award	Best Show (tie)		Won
2022	Yomiuri Theatre Award	Selection Committee's Special Award		Won
2022	Kikuta Kazuo Theatre	Grand Prize		Won

== Possible film adaptation ==
In July 2016, Warner Bros. applied to purchase the rights to Harry Potter and the Cursed Child, leading to speculation that the stage play was going to become a film, despite earlier claims, most notably from Rowling, that a film adaptation was not being made. In November 2021, Chris Columbus, who previously directed the first two installments of the Harry Potter film series, expressed interest in directing a film adaptation of Cursed Child, with the intent of having the main cast members reprise their roles. When The New York Times asked Daniel Radcliffe in 2022 if he would be ready to reprise his role as Harry Potter, he replied that he was not interested in it at the moment, but did not deny the possibility of doing so in the future.

In a Sunday Times interview in August 2025, Columbus confirmed that he maintains close relationships with the original cast but has not spoken to Rowling in "a decade or so". He went on to state that the controversy around Rowling's views on transgender people meant that a Cursed Child film with the original cast was "never going to happen". In a later interview with Variety, Columbus spoke of "separating the artist from the art" and described the controversy around Rowling as "just sad, it's very sad", while noting that he does not agree with her views.
