= Christine Jones (scenic designer) =

American scenic designer on Broadway

- Education: Concordia University (BFA); New York University (MFA)
- Occupations: Scenic designer, professor
- Spouse: Dallas Roberts
- Children: 2

Christine Jones is an American multidisciplinary artist for theater, opera, public art, and digital media. Beyond her Broadway, Off-Broadway, and West End Scenic Design work, including Harry Potter and the Cursed Child, American Idiot, and Spring Awakening, Jones is committed to inclusive public art and widening the reach of the digital realm. Her initiative Theatre for One, a mobile performance space designed for a single audience member and actor in collaboration with LOT-EK Architects, has held residencies at the Chicago Architecture Biennial, Arts Brookfield, Cork Midsummer Festival, the Times Square Alliance for Public Art, and universities across the globe. Theatre for One’s accompanying digital platform, co-created with Jenny Koons, and designed by OpenEndedGroup, was launched during the pandemic.

From curating Radiohead’s digital art exhibition KID AMNESIA to designing La Traviata and Rigoletto at the Metropolitan Opera, Jones works across mediums and genres. She conceived and co-directed SOCIAL! the social distance dance club with Steven Hoggett and David Byrne (Time Out's Best Event of 2021) at the Park Avenue Armory, where she is an artist-in-residence, and directed Queen of the Night, an immersive nightclub dining experience at the Paramount Hotel (Drama Desk Award for Best Unique Experience). Her video piece, Chorus of Us, was exhibited in the Armory’s digital celebration 100 Years, 100 Women, and her designs were featured in Curtain Call: Celebrating a Century of Women Designing for Live Performance at The New York Public Library for the Performing Arts.

With Brett Banakis, Jones started the collective AMP, which amplifies and supports emerging and underrepresented designers through equitable collaborations. AMP’s debut project is the musical adaptation of The Outsiders, (Tony Nomination), co-designed with Tatiana Kahvegian. A different designer will join Jones and Banakis on each project.

Jones served as the Denzel Washington Guest Chairperson for Fordham University’s Theatre Department, received an Obie for Sustained Excellence, and was honored with an Award of Distinction from Montreal’s Concordia University. She has lectured at Princeton University and teaches at New York University’s Tisch School of the Arts.

== Education ==
After graduating from the creative arts, literature and languages program at Marianopolis College in 1985, Jones earned a Bachelor of Fine Arts in design for theatre at Concordia University in 1989. She later earned her Master of Fine Arts at New York University.

== Off-Broadway work ==
Jones has designed for many productions Off-Broadway:

- Mr. Fox
- Burn This
- Coraline
- Debbie Does Dallas
- First Love
- Flesh And Blood
- Much Ado About Nothing
- Nocturne
- People Be Heard
- The Onion Cellar
- True Love
- Cyrano, a 2019 musical production starring Peter Dinklage

=== Awards ===
In 2015, Jones was awarded the Obie Award presented by the American Theatre Wing for sustained excellence in set design.

== Broadway ==
Jones made her Broadway scenic design debut in 2000 with her design for The Green Bird, directed by Julie Taymor. Jones designed the set for the 2007 Tony Award-winning musical Spring Awakening. She was nominated for the Tony Award for Best Scenic Design but lost to Bob Crowley for Mary Poppins. Jones designed the set for the 2010 musical American Idiot, for which she earned her first Tony Award. Jones has said, "It's just great to be recognized for doing something that you love, with people you love." Jones also designed the set for the 2011 musical revival of "On a Clear Day You Can See Forever" starring Harry Connick Jr. and the 2016 production of Harry Potter and the Cursed Child in London's West-End.

== Awards ==
Year	Show	Award	Category	Result
2018	Harry Potter and the Cursed Child	Tony Award	Tony Award for Best Scenic Design of a Play	Won
2016	Harry Potter and the Cursed Child	Critics' Circle Theatre Award	Best Designer	Won
2015	Let the Right One In	Drama Desk Award	Drama Desk Award for Outstanding Set Design	Nominated
2015	n/a	Obie Award	Sustained Excellence in Set Design	Won
2010	American Idiot	Tony Award	Tony Award for Best Scenic Design in a Musical	Won
2007	Spring Awakening	Tony Award	Tony Award for Best Scenic Design in a Musical	Nominated
2000	The Green Bird	Drama Desk Award	Drama Desk Award for Outstanding Set Design	Nominated

== Personal life ==
Jones is married to actor Dallas Roberts. They have two sons.
