= Mehr! Theater =

Mehr! Theater am Großmarkt
- Mehr! Theater
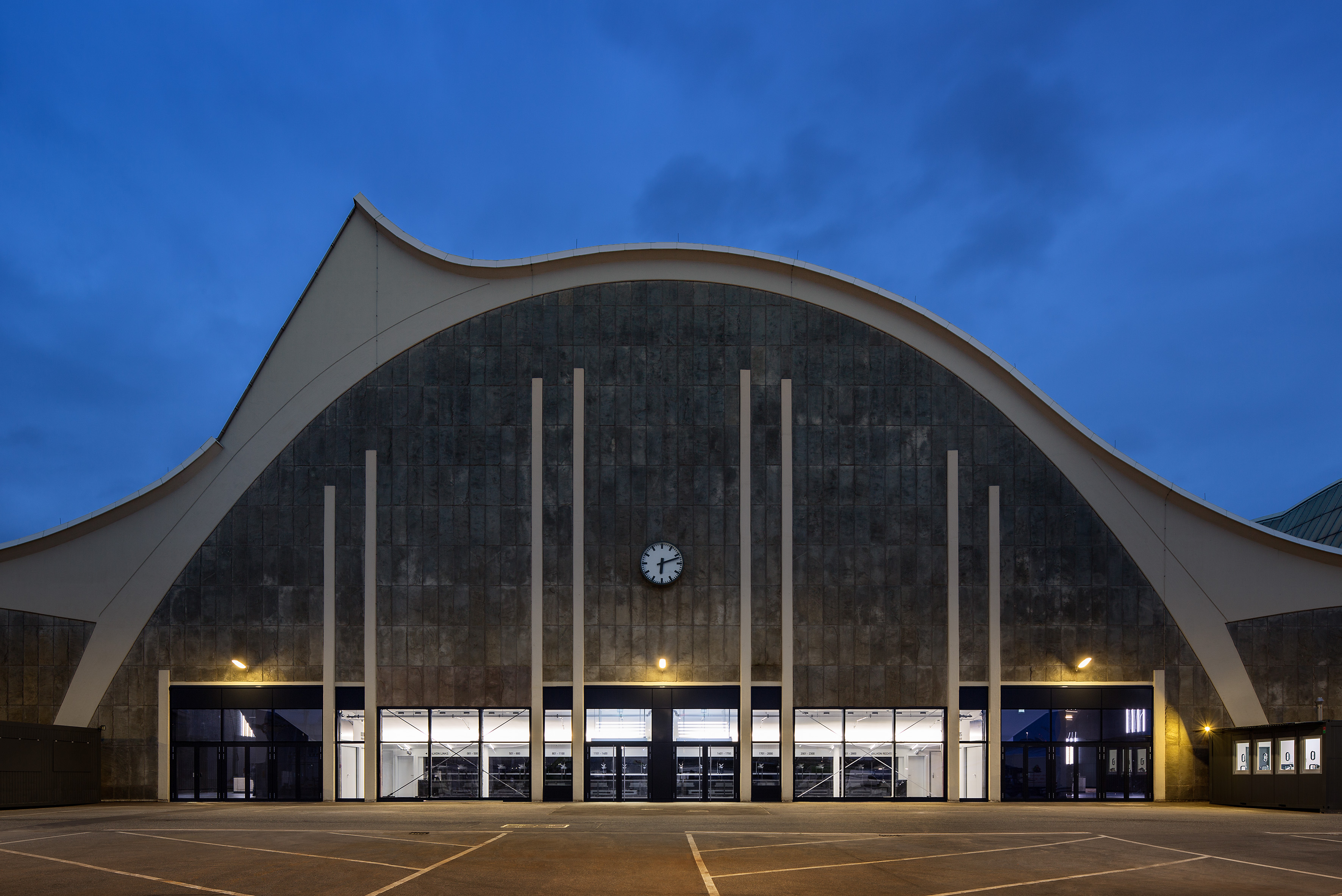
- Interactive map of Mehr! Theater am Großmarkt
- Former names: Großmarkthalle (1962-2015)
- Address: Banksstraße 28; 20097; Hamburg; Germany
- Owner: Mehr-BB Entertainment GmbH
- Capacity: 3,500

Construction
- Built: 1962 (Building)
- Opened: 7 May 2015
- Cost: €25 million

Website
- Venue Website

The Mehr! Theater am Großmarkt (or simply Mehr! Theater) is a multi-purpose event venue in Hamburg, Germany. It was built into the Großmarkthalle, which is a protected historic building constructed by architect Bernhard Hermkes in 1962. With a capacity of 3,500 people, it is the biggest theater in Hamburg and hosted several entertainment events since its opening in March 2015.

== Background ==
The Mehr! Theater opened on May 7, 2015, with a concert of the London Symphony Orchestra. Operator of the venue is the Düsseldorf-based company Mehr-BB Entertainment GmbH, with Maik Klokow being the manager. Since its opening in March 2015, the venue hosted several concerts and musicals, including performances by singers Sufjan Stevens, Kylie Minogue Iggy Pop, British band Editors and musicals such as Dirty Dancing and We Will Rock You. As of 2015, more than 170,000 people attended 100 concerts, shows and musicals.

The German version of Harry Potter and the Cursed Child was supposed to open on March 15, 2020, in The Mehr! Theater. Due to the COVID-19 pandemic the premiere was delayed several times and finally took place on December 5, 2021.

== Gallery ==
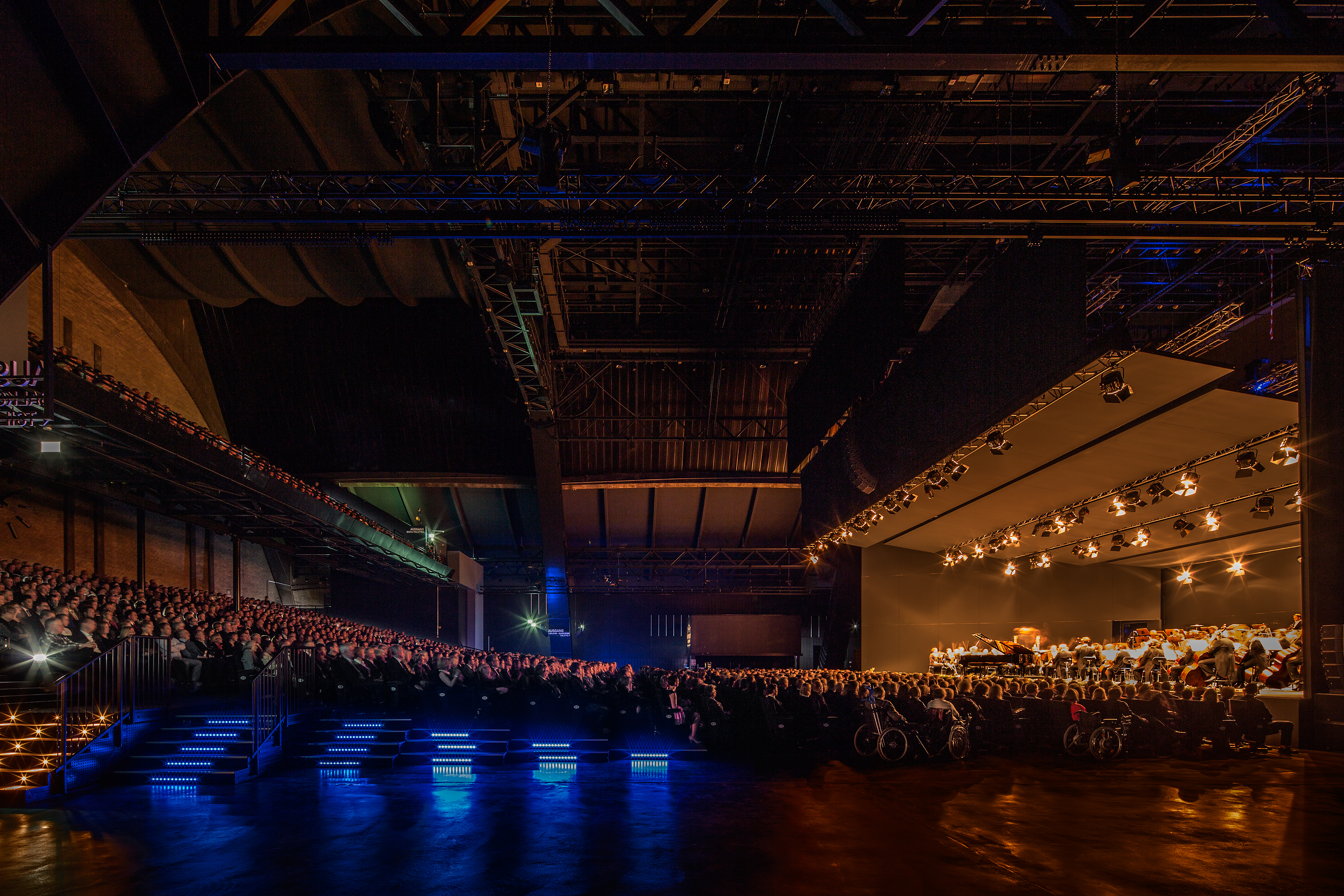
Interior of the venue as seen during the opening on March 7, 2015.

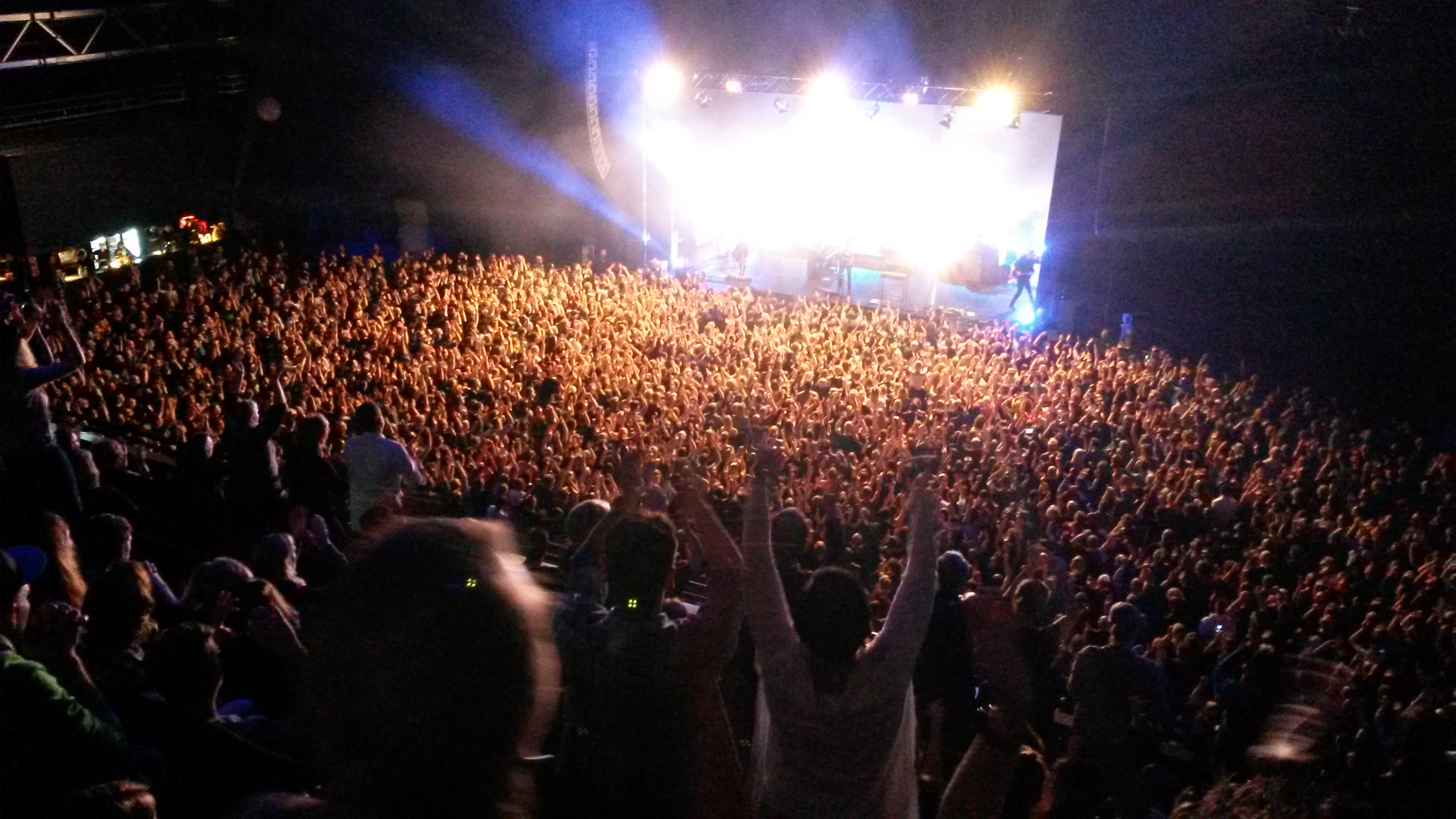
A rock concert at the venue.

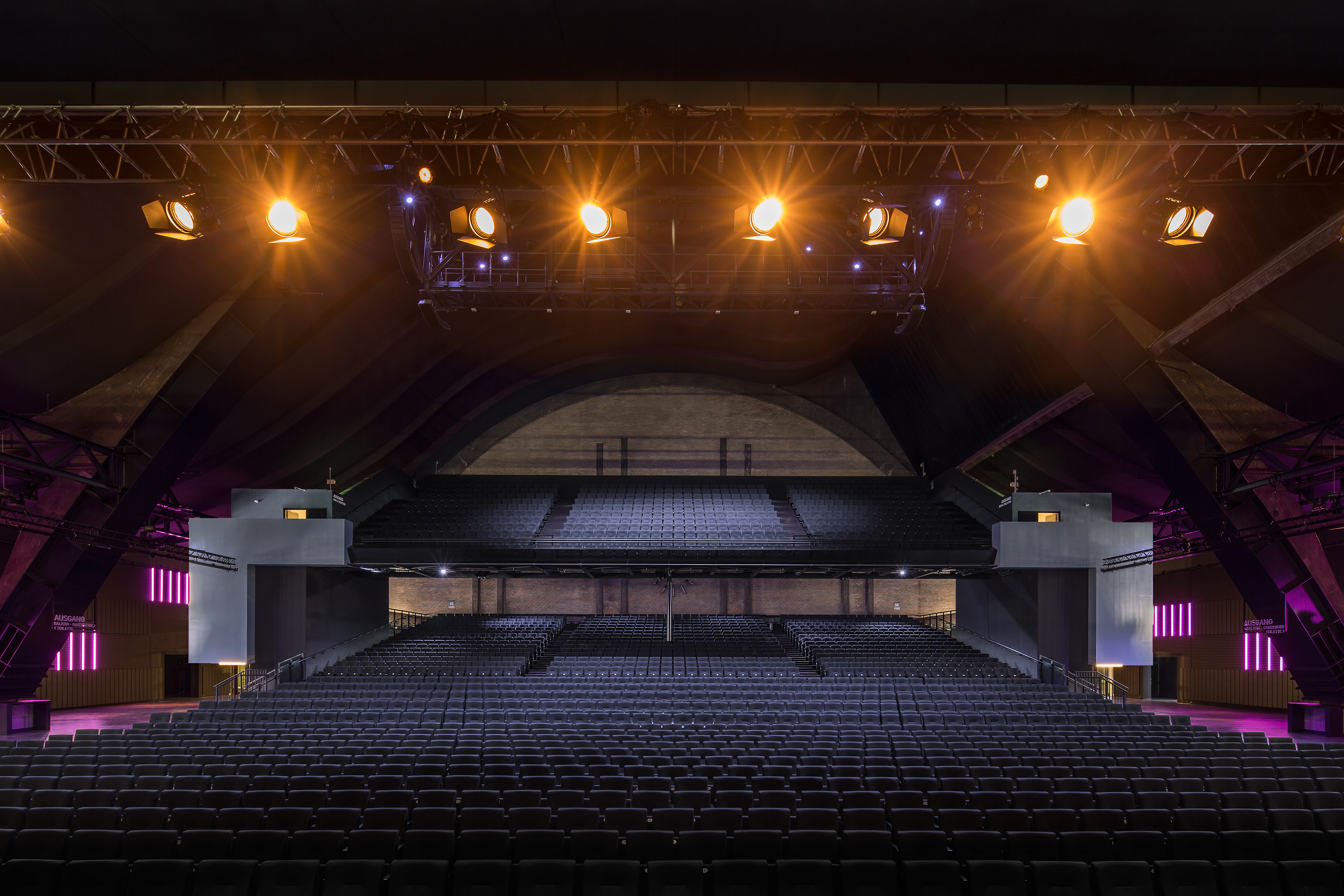
Interior

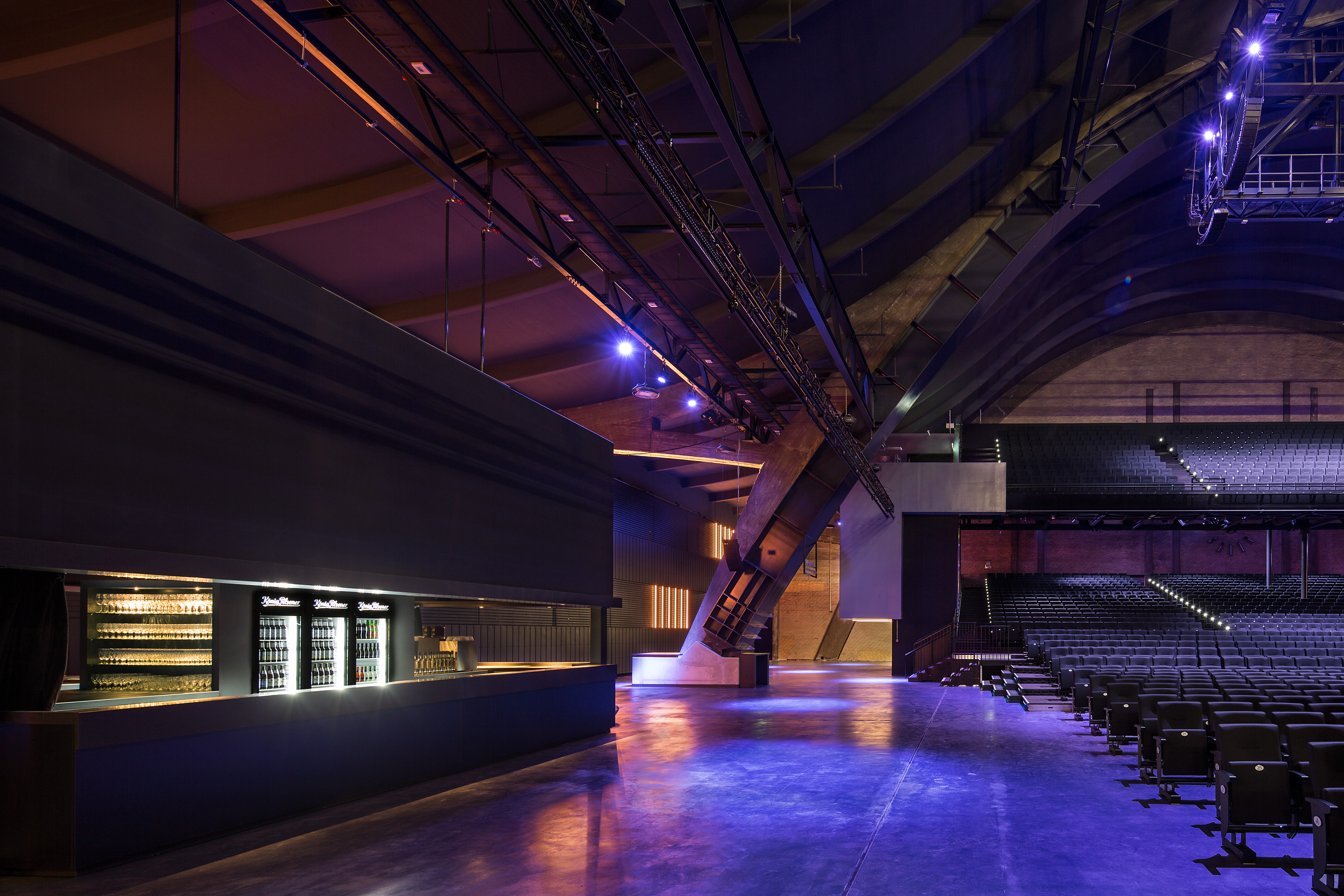
Side foyer
