= Akasaka ACT Theater =

Theatre in Akasaka, Minato, Tokyo, Japan

Coordinates: 35°40′22″N 139°44′6″E

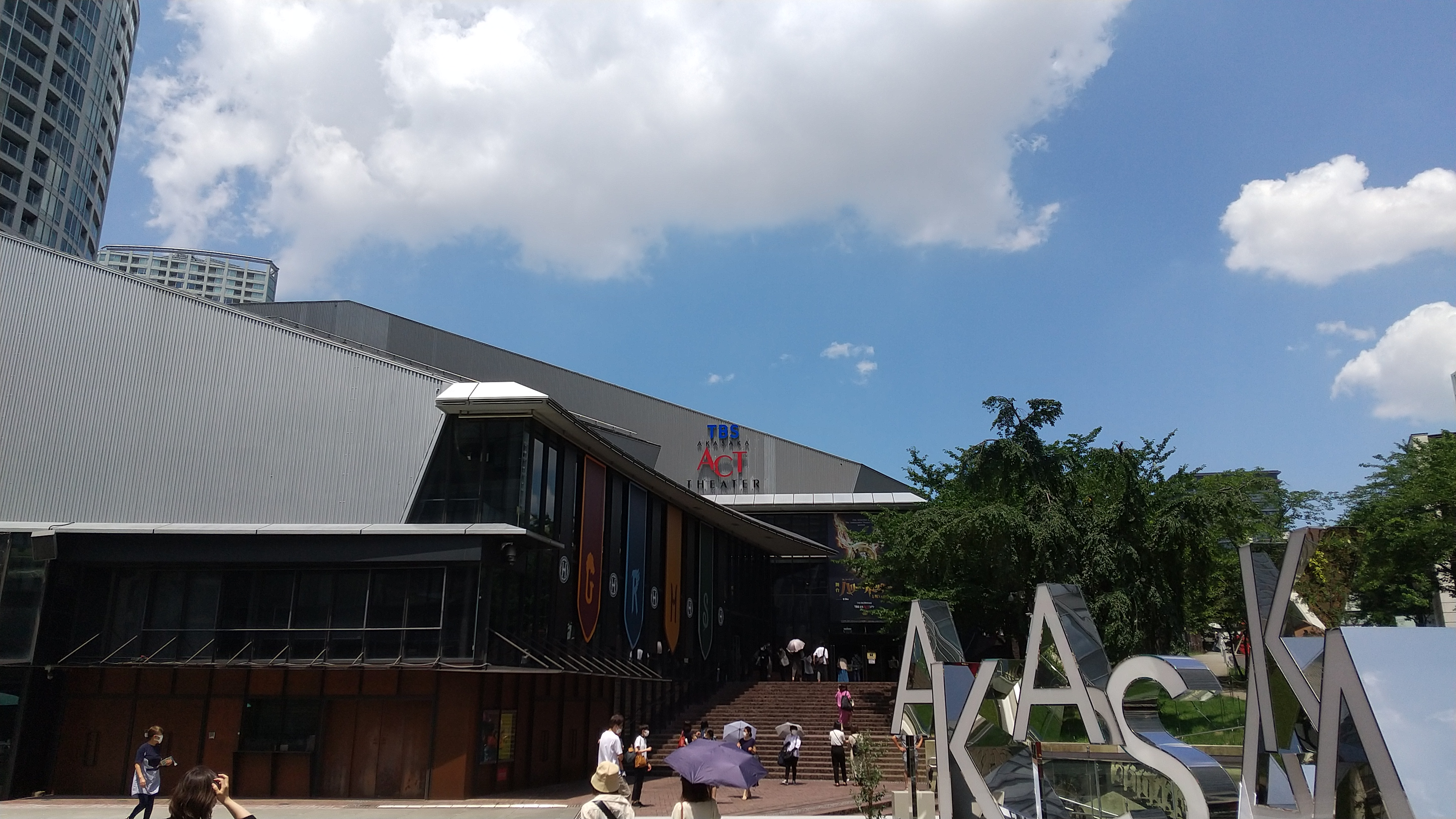
TBS Akasaka ACT Theater

The TBS Akasaka ACT Theater (Japanese: TBS赤坂ACTシアター) is a theatre located in Akasaka, Minato, Tokyo, Japan. Completed in 2008, the four-storey 28.9 metres (95 ft) high theatre has a capacity of 1,324 seats. In September 2014 the theatre staged Arthur Kopit's musical version of the Gaston Leroux classic, The Phantom of the Opera. The theater has been dedicated to the stage production of Harry Potter and the Cursed Child since June 2022.
