= Les Liaisons Dangereuses (play) =

1985 play by Christopher Hampton

- Poster for the 2008 Broadway revival
- Original language: English
- Written by: Christopher Hampton
- Subject: seduction, revenge, and human malice
- Genre: Drama
- Setting: Paris and the Bois de Vincennes, late 1780s

Premiere
- Date: 24 September 1985
- Place: The Other Place; Stratford-upon-Avon

Les Liaisons Dangereuses (French: [le ljɛzɔ̃ dɑ̃ʒ(ə)ʁøz]) is a 1985 play by Christopher Hampton adapted from the 1782 novel of the same name by Pierre Choderlos de Laclos. The play was first staged by the Royal Shakespeare Company and opened at The Other Place in Stratford-upon-Avon on 24 September 1985 starring Lindsay Duncan, Alan Rickman, Juliet Stevenson, Lesley Manville, and Fiona Shaw. It made its Broadway debut in 1987, with Duncan and Rickman reprising their roles. The play has since been revived several times on Broadway and the West End.

The play was adapted into the 1988 film Dangerous Liaisons, directed by Stephen Frears and starring Glenn Close, John Malkovich, and Michelle Pfeiffer.

== Premise ==
The plot focuses on the Marquise de Merteuil and the Vicomte de Valmont, rivals who use sex as a weapon of humiliation and degradation, all the while enjoying their cruel games. Their targets are the virtuous (and married) Madame de Tourvel and Cécile de Volanges, a young girl who has fallen in love with her music tutor, the Chevalier Danceny. In order to gain their trust, Merteuil and Valmont pretend to help the secret lovers so they can use them later in their own treacherous schemes.

== Notable casts ==
Character	Original Production	Broadway debut	Film adaptation	Broadway Revival	West End Revival	Broadway Revival	West End Revival
Character	1985	1987	1988	2008	2016	2016	2026
Marquise de Merteuil	Lindsay Duncan	Lindsay Duncan	Glenn Close	Laura Linney	Janet McTeer	Janet McTeer	Lesley Manville
Vicomte de Valmont	Alan Rickman	Alan Rickman	John Malkovich	Ben Daniels	Dominic West	Liev Schreiber	Aidan Turner
Madame de Tourvel	Juliet Stevenson	Suzanne Burden	Michelle Pfeiffer	Jessica Collins	Elaine Cassidy	Birgitte Hjort Sørensen	Monica Barbaro
Cécile de Volanges	Lesley Manville	Beatie Edney	Uma Thurman	Mamie Gummer	Morfydd Clark	Elena Kampouris	Hannah van der Westhuysen
Madame de Volanges	Fiona Shaw	Kristin Milward	Swoosie Kurtz	Kristine Nielsen	Adjoa Andoh	Ora Jones	Cat Simmons
Chevalier Danceny	Sean Baker	Hilton McRae	Keanu Reeves	Benjamin Walker	Edward Holcroft	Raffi Barsoumian	Darragh Hand

== Production history ==
=== 1985 Royal Shakespeare Company ===
Staged by the Royal Shakespeare Company, the play opened at The Other Place in Stratford-upon-Avon on 24 September 1985. Directed by Howard Davies, the cast included Lindsay Duncan as the Marquise de Merteuil, Alan Rickman as the Vicomte de Valmont, Juliet Stevenson as Madame de Tourvel, Lesley Manville as Cécile de Volanges, and Sean Baker as the Chevalier Danceny.

On 8 January 1986, the production transferred to The Pit, an intimate studio theatre in the Barbican Centre in London, with its original cast intact. Christopher Hampton won the Evening Standard Award for Best Play and the Laurence Olivier Award for Best New Play, and Lindsay Duncan received the Laurence Olivier Award for Best Actress. In October 1986, with only a few cast changes, the production transferred again to the Ambassadors Theatre in the West End. A recording of The Pit production can be listened to on premises, at the British Library.

=== 1987 Broadway debut ===
Lindsay Duncan and Alan Rickman reprised their roles for the Broadway production, also directed by Howard Davies. Following eight previews, it opened at the Music Box Theatre on April 30, 1987 and ran for 149 performances. Christopher Hampton was nominated for the Tony Award for Best Play and the Drama Desk Award for Outstanding Play, but lost both to August Wilson for Fences. Duncan won the Theatre World Award and Davies won the Tony Award for Best Direction of a Play. The show won the 1987 New York Drama Critics' Circle Award for Best Foreign Play.

=== 2008 Broadway revival ===
Following 22 previews, a Broadway revival produced by the Roundabout Theatre Company opened at the American Airlines Theatre on May 1, 2008 and ran for 77 performances. Directed by Rufus Norris, the cast included Laura Linney as the Marquise de Merteuil, Ben Daniels as the Vicomte de Valmont, Mamie Gummer as Cécile de Volanges, and Benjamin Walker as the Chevalier Danceny, with Siân Phillips in the supporting role of Madame de Rosemonde. The production was nominated for the Tony Award for Best Revival of a Play but lost to Boeing-Boeing.

=== 2012 Sydney Theatre Company ===
Hampton's play was produced by the Sydney Theatre Company and performed at the Wharf Theatre as part of the 2012 season. The production was directed by Sam Strong, with Hugo Weaving playing the Vicomte de Valmont and Pamela Rabe the Marquise de Merteuil. Strong said that he liked the line given to Rosamonde “The only thing which might surprise one is how little the world changes” because it "speaks directly to the timelessness of the piece's exploration of human behaviour, from the less savoury parts like betrayal and manipulation to the best parts like being in love." He also said he was "intrigued by the paradoxical nature of the Valmont and Tourvel story – the manner in which Valmont is both redeemed and destroyed by love at the same time". One reviewer noted that "Director Sam Strong's beautifully paced production emphasises gratification via the wielding of power rather than via lust."

=== 2016 West End/Broadway revival ===
The play was revived at the Donmar Warehouse in the winter of 2015–16, the first time it had received a major outing in London since its 1986 premiere, directed was Josie Rourke and starring Dominic West as Valmont and Janet McTeer as Madame de Merteuil. The production transferred to Broadway in a limited engagement with McTeer joined by Liev Schreiber and Mary Beth Peil as Madame de Rosemonde. The play opened at the Booth Theatre on October 30, 2016 and closing earlier on January 8, 2017 (rather than on January 22.)

=== 2026 West End revival ===
A new revival of the play, directed by Marianne Elliott, opened at the National Theatre - Lyttleton on 21 March 2026 and closed on 6 June. The production starred Aidan Turner as Valmont and Lesley Manville (who appeared in the play's original production) as Madame de Merteuil. Like many productions at the National Theatre, the show was filmed and subsequently released in select cinemas.

== Awards and nominations ==
=== 1986 West End production ===
Year	Award	Category	Nominated work	Result	Ref.
1986	Evening Standard Theatre Award	Best Play	Christopher Hampton	Won	
1986	Laurence Olivier Awards	Best New Play	Christopher Hampton	Won	
1986	Laurence Olivier Awards	Best Actress	Lindsay Duncan	Won	
1986	Laurence Olivier Awards	Best Actress	Juliet Stevenson	Nominated	
1986	Laurence Olivier Awards	Best Director	Howard Davies	Nominated	
1986	Laurence Olivier Awards	Best Set Design	Bob Crowley	Nominated	

=== 1987 Broadway production ===
Year	Award	Category	Nominated work	Result	Ref.
1987	Drama Desk Awards	Outstanding Play	Christopher Hampton	Nominated	
1987	Drama Desk Awards	Outstanding Direction of a Play	Howard Davies	Won	
1987	Drama Desk Awards	Outstanding Actor in a Play	Alan Rickman	Nominated	
1987	Drama Desk Awards	Outstanding Actress in a Play	Lindsay Duncan	Nominated	
1987	Drama Desk Awards	Outstanding Featured Actress in a Play	Suzanne Burden	Nominated	
1987	Drama Desk Awards	Best Set Design	Bob Crowley	Nominated	
1987	Drama Desk Awards	Best Costume Design	Bob Crowley	Nominated	
1987	Drama Desk Awards	Best Lighting Design	Chris Parry	Won	
1987	Tony Awards	Best Play	Christopher Hampton	Nominated	
1987	Tony Awards	Best Actor in a Play	Alan Rickman	Nominated	
1987	Tony Awards	Best Actress in a Play	Lindsay Duncan	Nominated	
1987	Tony Awards	Best Direction of a Play	Howard Davies	Nominated	
1987	Tony Awards	Best Scenic Design	Bob Crowley	Nominated	
1987	Tony Awards	Best Costume Design	Bob Crowley	Nominated	
1987	Tony Awards	Best Lighting Design	Beverly Emmons and Chris Parry	Nominated	
1987	New York Drama Critics Circle	Best Foreign Play	Christopher Hampton	Won	
1987	Theater World Award	Distinguished Performance	Lindsay Duncan	Won	

=== 2008 Broadway revival ===
Year	Award	Category	Nominated work	Result	Ref.
2008	Drama Desk Award	Outstanding Scenic Design of a Play	Scott Pask	Won	
2008	Drama Desk Award	Outstanding Costume Design of a Play	Katrina Lindsay	Won	
2008	Drama League Award	Distinguished Revival of a Play		Nominated	
2008	Outer Critics Circle Awards	Outstanding Revival of a Play		Nominated	
2008	Outer Critics Circle Awards	Outstanding Direction of a Play	Rufus Norris	Nominated	
2008	Outer Critics Circle Awards	Outstanding Actor in a Play	Ben Daniels	Nominated	
2008	Outer Critics Circle Awards	Outstanding Actress in a Play	Laura Linney	Nominated	
2008	Outer Critics Circle Awards	Outstanding Featured Actress in a Play	Siân Phillips	Nominated	
2008	Outer Critics Circle Awards	Outstanding Set Design	Scott Pask	Nominated	
2008	Outer Critics Circle Awards	Outstanding Costume Design	Katrina Lindsay	Won	
2008	Outer Critics Circle Awards	Outstanding Lighting Design	Donald Holder	Nominated	
2008	Theater World Awards	Distinguished Performance	Ben Daniels	Won	
2008	Tony Awards	Best Revival of a Play		Nominated	
2008	Tony Awards	Best Actor in a Play	Ben Daniels	Nominated	
2008	Tony Awards	Best Scenic Design of a Play	Scott Pask	Nominated	
2008	Tony Awards	Best Costume Design of a Play	Katrina Lindsay	Won	
2008	Tony Awards	Best Lighting Design of a Play	Donald Holder	Nominated	

=== 2016 West End revival ===
Year	Award	Category	Nominated work	Result	Ref.
2016	Laurence Olivier Awards	Best Revival		Nominated	
2016	Laurence Olivier Awards	Best Actress	Janet McTeer	Nominated	

== Film adaptation ==
Hampton adapted the play for the screen in a 1988 film version directed by Stephen Frears and starring Glenn Close, John Malkovich, Michelle Pfeiffer, Uma Thurman, Swoosie Kurtz, Mildred Natwick, Peter Capaldi and Keanu Reeves. It received seven nominations at the 61st Academy Awards, including for the Best Picture, and won three: Best Adapted Screenplay, Best Costume Design, and Best Production Design.
