= Katrina Lindsay =

British set and costume designer

- Born: 1967 (age 58–59); Cornwall, England
- Education: Central Saint Martins

Katrina Lindsay is a British set and costume designer. She won the Tony Award for Best Costume Design in a Play for Les Liaisons Dangereuses and Harry Potter and the Cursed Child.

== Early life and education ==
Lindsay studied Theatre Design at Central Saint Martins.

== Career ==
On the West End, Lindsay has designed sets for The Lehman Trilogy, Cabaret, Hamlet, Small Island, Hex, and The Motive and the Cue.

Lindsay made her Broadway debut in 2008, when she designed costumes for Les Liaisons Dangereuses. For her work, Lindsay won the Tony Award for Best Costume Design in a Play, the Outer Critics Circle Award for Outstanding Costume Design, and the Drama Desk Award for Outstanding Costume Design.

Lindsay designed costumes for the 2016 Broadway production of American Psycho, for which she garnered additional nominations from the Outer Critics Circle and the Drama Desk Awards.

In 2016, Lindsay designed costumes for the original West End production of Harry Potter and the Cursed Child. For this production she was nominated for the WhatsOnStage Award for Best Costume Design, and won the Laurence Olivier Award for Best Costume Design. The production transferred to Broadway's Lyric Theatre in 2018. The same year, Lindsay was nominated for the Outer Critics Circle Award for Outstanding Costume Design and the Drama Desk Award for Outstanding Costume Design of a Play, and she won her second Tony Award for Best Costume Design in a Play.

Lindsay designed costumes for the 2021 Broadway production of The Lehman Trilogy and the 2024 production of Tammy Faye.
