= John Tiffany =

British theatre director

John Tiffany OBE
- Born: John Richard Tiffany; 1971 (age 54–55); West Yorkshire, England, UK
- Occupation: Director

John Richard Tiffany OBE (born 1971) is an English theatre director. He directed the internationally successful productions Harry Potter and the Cursed Child, Black Watch and Once. He has won 2 Tony Awards, an Olivier Award, a Drama Desk Award and an Obie Award.

== Early life and career ==
Tiffany's birth was registered in Huddersfield, England. He was raised there and in nearby Marsden. His mother was a nurse and an amdram chorus girl. His father was an engineer who also played in a brass band. As a youth, he participated in the Huddersfield Choral Society Youth Choir and held jobs at Boots UK and a restaurant. He initially studied biology at Glasgow University, but switched to classics and drama.

Tiffany's theatrical background is in "developing and directing new plays at Scottish theaters". He was literary director at Edinburgh's Traverse Theatre from 1997 to 2001. He then began his working association with Vicky Featherstone, becoming associate director at UK new writing touring theatre company Paines Plough, from 2001 to 2005, where Featherstone was artistic director.

== National Theatre of Scotland ==
After Featherstone was named founding artistic director of the National Theatre of Scotland in late 2004, she hired Tiffany again, as associate director of New Work of the company.

Tiffany's earliest success with the company was his direction of the highly regarded 2006 production of Black Watch. Tiffany's other National Theatre of Scotland productions included an adaptation of Peter Pan, which played in Glasgow, in April to May 2010, and then toured to London, Inverness, Edinburgh and Aberdeen; a version of The Bacchae, starring Alan Cumming as Dionysus; and Macbeth, as co-director with Andrew Goldberg, in which Cumming played all the roles. His final production as associate director was Let the Right One In produced by Marla Rubin, which premiered in Dundee in 2013.

== Once ==
James Bond movie producer Barbara Broccoli acquired the stage production rights for Once, which is based on the 2006 musical film by the same name, and subsequently recruited Tiffany to produce it after seeing his Black Watch at St. Ann's Warehouse in Brooklyn.

Tiffany collaborated on Once with longtime friend and choreographer Steven Hoggett, with whom he had also worked on Black Watch. Although the two had been close friends since 1987, they did not collaborate until 2003 when they worked on The Straits by Gregory Burke. Once marked their seventh collaboration.

Tiffany directed the Off-Broadway and Broadway productions of Once in 2011–2012. He won the 2012 Drama Desk Award for Outstanding Director of a Musical for his direction of Once. Among the artistic decisions that Hoggett and Tiffany made was the decision to eliminate the choreography from several works including "Falling Slowly", which won the Academy Award for Best Original Song at the 80th Academy Awards in 2008. He won the Tony Award for Best Direction of a Musical for Once at the 66th Tony Awards.

Tiffany also received a 2012 Obie Award special citation (along with Once colleagues Steven Hoggett and Martin Lowe). Once earned 11 Tony Award nominations, more than any other production for the 2011–12 season.

== Work 2013 to present ==
In 2013, he directed a production of Tennessee Williams' The Glass Menagerie at the American Repertory Theater, Cambridge, Massachusetts, which transferred to Broadway. The work earned him a second Best Direction of a Play Tony Award nomination. However, he lost out to Kenny Leon who directed A Raisin in the Sun. In April 2015, his production of Enda Walsh's adaptation of The Twits was described as "torture" by Telegraph Chief Critic Dominic Cavendish.

Tiffany directed the staged version of J.K. Rowling's Harry Potter and the Cursed Child. The play opened at the West End Palace Theatre, London on 7 June 2016 in previews and officially on 30 July. Harry Potter and the Cursed Child opened on Broadway on 22 April 2018, again directed by Tiffany. He won the 2018 Tony Award for Best Direction of a Play, 2018 Drama Desk Award for Outstanding Director of a Play, and 2018 Outer Critics Circle Award for Outstanding Director of a Play.

Tiffany directed the world premiere of Wild Rose, when it opened at the Royal Lyceum Theatre, Edinburgh in 2025. In 2027, he is directing the world premiere of Supvernova at Pitlochry Festival Theatre.

== Awards and nominations ==
Year	Award	Category	Work	Result
2016	Critics' Circle Theatre Award	Best Director	Harry Potter and the Cursed Child	Won
