= Alen Hodzovic =

German actor and singer

Alen Hodzovic (born May 30, 1977) is a German actor and singer. In 2009, he became the first German citizen to win First Prize at Kurt Weill Foundation's international Lotte Lenya Competition for singers.

== Biography ==
Alen Hodzovic graduated from the Royal Academy of Music in London where he won the H.L. Hammond Prize for Verse Speaking, adjudicated by director John Caird. He played Raoul in the Stuttgart production of Andrew Lloyd Webber's The Phantom of the Opera and Ken in a German-language production of John Logan's play Red. In 2007, he appeared as a background singer for Elton John at the Concert for Diana at Wembley Stadium. From 2021-2024, he played Draco Malfoy in the original Hamburg production of Harry Potter and the Cursed Child (Harry Potter und das verwunschene Kind), being voted „Best Performer in a Play“ at the 2024 BroadwayWorld Germany Awards. From 2024 to 2025, he played the Baker in an English language production of Into the Woods at Theater Basel, Switzerland.
