= Hex (musical) =

2021 musical

- Promotional Poster
- Music: Jim Fortune
- Lyrics: Rufus Norris
- Book: Tanya Ronder
- Basis: Sleeping Beauty by Charles Perrault
- Premiere: 4 December 2021: Olivier Theatre, Royal National Theatre, London
- Productions: 2021 London

Hex is a musical with book by Tanya Ronder, lyrics by Rufus Norris and music by Jim Fortune based on the classic fairy tale Sleeping Beauty by Charles Perrault.

== Plot ==
Fairy (a fairy named Fairy) lives in a forest all alone, until a palace secretary, Smith, stumbles upon her whilst running from an ogre. He has been searching for a fairy to bring back to the palace to cast a spell to put the newly born princess to sleep, as she has been keeping the whole palace awake. Fairy says if this is what the baby wants, she will be able to perform a bless of sleep on the child.

The show also deals with themes of parenting and the difficulties of the postpartum period.

== Production history ==
=== National Theatre, London (2021-23) ===
The musical was announced on 4 June 2021 as part of the National Theatre, London's autumn 2021 season. On 16 July 2021 initial casting was announced, including Rosalie Craig as the Fairy. The show began previews in the Olivier Theatre from 4 December until 22 January 2022. The press night was due to take place on 15 December, however due to the rise in cases of the COVID-19 pandemic it was postponed to 21 December, then cancelled along with numerous other performances including the filming of the production to be broadcast for NT Live. Norris announced that the musical would end on 22 January 2022, but be restaged later in the year with a full run including a press night.

The production was directed by Norris with design by Katrina Lindsay, orchestrations by Simon Hale, music supervision by Marc Tritschler, music direction by Tarek Merchant, lighting design by Paul Anderson, choreography by Jade Hackett with consultant choreography by Bill Deamer, sound design by Simon Baker and video design by Ash J Woodward.

A highlights album of songs from the musical was released by Broadway Records on 15 December 2021.

Return season performances were scheduled to run from 26 November 2022 to 14 January 2023 with Irish actor/singer Lisa Lambe as the Fairy.

== Cast and characters ==
Character	London	London Remount
Character	2021	2022
Fairy	Rosalie Craig	Lisa Lambe
Queenie	Tamsin Carroll	Victoria Hamilton-Barritt
Rose	Kat Ronney	Rosie Graham
Bert	Michael Elcock	Michael Elcock
Prince	Natasha J Barnes	
Queen Regina	Daisy Maywood	Neïma Naouri
Bruiser Thorn	Delroy Atkinson	Mark Oxtoby
King/Prince	Shaq Taylor	Kody Mortimer
Smith	Sargon Yelda	Michael Matus

== Reception ==
Time Out described the cast as "terrific".

The Guardian described the show as "a fabulous musical" that is original and quirky, but wasn't as positive about the music.
