= Erika Mabuchi =

Japanese actress

- 馬渕 英里何
- Born: March 7, 1979 (age 47); Mitoyo, Kagawa, Japan
- Occupation: Actress
- Years active: 1993–present
- Agent: Horipro

Erika Mabuchi (馬渕 英里何, Mabuchi Erika; born 7 March 1979 in Kagawa Prefecture, Japan) is a Japanese actress.

== Filmography ==
=== Films ===
- Shall We Dance? (1996)
- Itsuka dokusho suruhi (2005)
- Call Boy (2018)
- Inori (2021)
- Akira and Akira (2022)
- Boy's Wish: We Can Use Magic Once in a Lifetime (2025)

=== Television ===
- Hakusen Nagashi (1996), Fuyumi Tachibana
- Hakusen Nagashi: Spring at Age 19 (1997), Fuyumi Tachibana
- Great Teacher Onizuka (1998), Yoshiko Uchiyamada
- Hakusen Nagashi: The Wind at Age 20 (1999), Fuyumi Tachibana
- Hakusen Nagashi: The Poem of Travels (2001), Fuyumi Tachibana
- Hakusen Nagashi: Age 25 (2003), Fuyumi Tachibana
- Hakusen Nagashi: The Final – Even as the Times of Dreaming have Passed (2005), Fuyumi Tachibana
- School Counselor (2017)
