= Steven Hoggett =

British choreographer and movement director

- Born: 30 November 1971 (age 54); UK
- Occupation: Choreographer
- Years active: 1994–present

Steven Hoggett (born 30 November 1971) is a British choreographer and movement director. He has won an Olivier Award as well as an Obie Award, has been nominated four times for a Drama Desk Award and three times for a Tony Award.

== Early life ==
Hoggett was brought up near Huddersfield, England. As a youth, he participated in the Huddersfield Choral Society Youth Choir and held jobs at Boots UK and a restaurant. He studied at Swansea University, where he studied literature.

== Career ==
Hoggett gained early experience at a workshop with Volcano Theatre Company, based in Swansea. He then founded a physical theatre company in Wales called Frantic Assembly, with his friend and fellow student Scott Graham. The company's first production was a 1994 revival of John Osborne's classic Look Back in Anger, in which Hoggett directed, produced, and performed.

The company staged numerous productions in their early years, especially at the Edinburgh Fringe Festival. Their unique blend of theatre and movement began to attract attention, and soon Frantic Assembly were producing large scale touring work and collaborating with some of the UK's biggest theatre companies. Hoggett would go on to direct and choreograph several shows for the company, including "Beautiful Burnout" (with the National Theatre of Scotland), an adaptation of Shakespeare's Othello, "pool, no water", "Stockholm", and "Little Dogs" (with National Theatre Wales).

He first worked with childhood friend John Tiffany while Tiffany was Associate Director at the Traverse Theatre, Edinburgh on a production of Gregory Burke's The Straits in 2003.

The pair then went on to collaborate on what would be their biggest success to date, Gregory Burke's Black Watch, which was first produced by the National Theatre of Scotland at the Edinburgh Festival Fringe in 2006

The piece was an instant success, and would garner Hoggett the Laurence Olivier Award for Best Theatre Choreographer at the 2009 Laurence Olivier Awards, along with a slew of other awards. The show undertook several extremely successful international tours, including a stint at the St. Ann's Warehouse in Brooklyn, which would lead to Hoggett working on many new productions in the USA. These included American Idiot, Peter and the Starcatcher and Once, the musical adaptation of the hit independent film, directed by John Tiffany.

Once earned more Tony nominations (11) than any other production for the 2011–12 season. He also received a 2012 Obie Award special citation (along with Once colleagues John Tiffany and Martin Lowe).

His other recent productions include choreography for the National Theatre production of The Curious Incident of the Dog in the Night Time (with Scott Graham), which garnered the pair an Olivier nomination. With John Tiffany, an adaptation of the Swedish vampire novel Let The Right One In for the National Theatre of Scotland, Tony Nominated Fight Choreography for Rocky The Musical and Sting's new musical, The Last Ship.

Hoggett provided choreography for an animated sequence in the DreamWorks feature film How To Train Your Dragon 2.

On 26 June 2015, it was announced that he would be working on the Harry Potter stage play The Cursed Child with long time collaborator John Tiffany. He went on to be nominated for the 2017 Laurence Olivier Award for best choreography for his work on the production. The production transferred to Broadway in April 2018.

== Personal life ==
Steven married Kyle Callicott in March 2016.

== Major theatre credits ==
Start year	Production	Role	Company / venue	Notes and awards
2006	Black Watch	Choreographer	National Theatre of Scotland	Won: 2009 Laurence Olivier Award for Best Theatre Choreographer
2010	Beautiful Burnout	Director and choreographer, with Scott Graham	Frantic Assembly / National Theatre of Scotland	Nominated: 2011 Drama Desk Award for Outstanding Choreography
2010	American Idiot	Choreographer	Broadway / US tour	Nominated: 2010 Astaire Award for Outstanding Choreographer of a Broadway Show
2011	Peter and the Starcatcher	Movement	Broadway / US tour	Nominated: 2011 Drama Desk Award for Outstanding Choreography; Won: 2011 Lucille Lortel Award for Outstanding Choreographer
2011	Once	Movement	NYTW / Broadway / West End	Nominated: 2012 Tony Award, 2012 Astaire Award, 2012 Outer Critics Circle Award for Choreography, and 2010–2011 Joe A. Callaway Award for Outstanding Choreography; Won: 2012 Special Citation Obie Award, with Martin Lowe and John Tiffany, and 2012 Lucille Lortel Award for Outstanding Choreographer
2012	The Curious Incident of the Dog in the Night-Time	Choreography, with Scott Graham	National Theatre / West End / Broadway	Nominated: 2013 Laurence Olivier Award for Best Theatre Choreographer, with Scott Graham; Nominated: 2015 Tony Award and 2015 Astaire Award, with Scott Graham
2013	The Glass Menagerie	Movement	American Repertory Theatre / Broadway	
2013	The Light Princess	Choreography	National Theatre	
2013	What's It All About? Bacharach Reimagined, later titled Close to You	Director	NYTW / Menier Chocolate Factory / West End	
2013	Let the Right One In	Associate director, with John Tiffany	National Theatre of Scotland / West End / St. Ann's Warehouse	
2014	Rocky the Musical	Fight choreography	Stage Entertainments Hamburg / Broadway	Nominated: 2014 Tony Award, with Kelly Devine, 2014 Astaire Award, 2014 Drama Desk Award, and 2014 Outer Critics Circle Award for Choreography
2014	The Last Ship	Choreography	Broadway	Nominated: 2015 Drama Desk Award for Outstanding Choreography and 2015 Astaire Award
2015	Brooklynite	Choreography	Vineyard Theatre	
2015	The Twits	Associate director and movement	Royal Court	
2016	The Crucible	Movement	Broadway	
2016	Harry Potter and the Cursed Child	Movement director	West End / Broadway	Nominated: 2017 Olivier Award for Best Choreography
2017	Joan of Arc: Into the Fire	Choreographer	Public Theatre	
2017	Pinocchio	Associate director	National Theatre / Disney Theatrical	
2019	The Ocean at the End of the Lane	Movement director	Royal National Theatre	
2022	A Beautiful Noise	Choreographer	Broadway	Won: 2023 Chita Rivera Award for Outstanding Choreography in a Broadway Show
2023	Sweeney Todd: The Demon Barber of Fleet Street	Choreographer	Broadway	Nominated: 2023 Tony Award
2027	Supernova	Movement Director	Pitlochry Festival Theatre	
