= 79th Tony Awards =

2026 US theatrical awards ceremony

- Date: June 7, 2026
- Venue: Radio City Music Hall
- Hosted by: Pink

Highlights
- Most wins: Death of a Salesman (6)
- Most nominations: The Lost Boys and Schmigadoon! (12)
- Website: tonyawards.com

Television/radio coverage
- Network: CBS; Paramount+
- Produced by: Raj Kapoor; Sarah Levine Hall; Jack Sussman
- Directed by: Liz Clare

The 79th Tony Awards were held on June 7, 2026, to recognize excellence in Broadway productions during the 2025–26 season. The ceremony took place at Radio City Music Hall in New York City, and was broadcast on CBS and streamed on Paramount+.

== Ceremony information ==
Pluto TV streamed the pre-ceremony broadcast The Tony Awards: Act One, hosted by Laura Benanti and Tituss Burgess.

Raj Kapoor, Sarah Levine Hall, and Jack Sussman produced the ceremony, replacing Ricky Kirshner and Glenn Weiss at White Cherry Entertainment who produced from 2004 to 2025. Pop singer Pink, whose Broadway-adjacent credits include having her songs featured in & Juliet and Moulin Rouge!, served as host.

The musical adaptation of the television series Schmigadoon! won Best Musical and three others including two for the show's co-creator Cinco Paul, while the play Liberation won its sole Tony for Best Play.

The revival of Arthur Miller's Death of a Salesman won the most awards at the ceremony with six in total.

== Eligibility ==
The Tony Awards eligibility dates for the 2025–2026 Broadway season were April 28, 2025, through April 26, 2026. Productions were also required to meet all other eligibility criteria as previously set forth by the American Theatre Wing and the Broadway League. There are 41 legitimate Broadway-eligible theaters in which a production must be performed to attain eligibility for award consideration. Nominations for the 2026 Tony Awards were announced on May 5, 2026.

Original plays

- The Balusters
- Call Me Izzy
- Dog Day Afternoon
- The Fear of 13
- Giant
- Liberation
- Little Bear Ridge Road
- Punch

Original musicals

- Beaches
- The Lost Boys
- The Queen of Versailles
- Schmigadoon!
- Titanique
- Two Strangers (Carry a Cake Across New York)

Play revivals

- Art
- Becky Shaw
- Bug
- Death of a Salesman
- Every Brilliant Thing
- Fallen Angels
- Joe Turner's Come and Gone
- Marjorie Prime
- Oedipus
- Proof
- Waiting for Godot

Musical revivals

- Cats: The Jellicle Ball
- Chess
- Mamma Mia!
- Ragtime
- Richard O'Brien's The Rocky Horror Show

== Winners and nominees ==
=== Competitive awards ===
Best Play	Best Musical
Liberation; The Balusters; Giant; Little Bear Ridge Road	Schmigadoon!; The Lost Boys; Titaníque; Two Strangers (Carry a Cake Across New York)
Best Revival of a Play	Best Revival of a Musical
Death of a Salesman; Becky Shaw; Every Brilliant Thing; Fallen Angels; Oedipus	Ragtime; Cats: The Jellicle Ball; Richard O'Brien's The Rocky Horror Show
Best Performance by a Leading Actor in a Play	Best Performance by a Leading Actress in a Play
John Lithgow as Roald Dahl – Giant; Will Harrison as Jacob Dunne – Punch; Nathan Lane as Willy Loman – Death of a Salesman; Daniel Radcliffe as Narrator – Every Brilliant Thing; Mark Strong as Oedipus – Oedipus	Lesley Manville as Jocasta – Oedipus; Rose Byrne as Jane Banbury – Fallen Angels; Carrie Coon as Agnes White – Bug; Susannah Flood as Lizzie – Liberation; Kelli O'Hara as Julia Sterroll – Fallen Angels
Best Performance by a Leading Actor in a Musical	Best Performance by a Leading Actress in a Musical
Joshua Henry as Coalhouse Walker Jr. – Ragtime; Nicholas Christopher as Anatoly Sergievsky – Chess; Luke Evans as Frank-N-Furter – Richard O'Brien's The Rocky Horror Show; Sam Tutty as Dougal Todd – Two Strangers (Carry a Cake Across New York); Brandon Uranowitz as Tateh – Ragtime	Caissie Levy as Mother – Ragtime; Sara Chase as Melissa Gimble – Schmigadoon!; Stephanie Hsu as Janet Weiss – Richard O'Brien's The Rocky Horror Show; Marla Mindelle as Celine Dion – Titaníque; Christiani Pitts as Robin Rainey – Two Strangers (Carry a Cake Across New York)
Best Performance by a Featured Actor in a Play	Best Performance by a Featured Actress in a Play
Alden Ehrenreich as Max Garrett – Becky Shaw; Christopher Abbott as Biff Loman – Death of a Salesman; Danny Burstein as Jon – Marjorie Prime; Brandon J. Dirden as Pozzo – Waiting for Godot; Ruben Santiago-Hudson as Bynum Walker – Joe Turner's Come and Gone; Richard Thomas as Elliott Emerson – The Balusters	Laurie Metcalf as Linda Loman – Death of a Salesman; Betsy Aidem as Margie – Liberation; Marylouise Burke as Penny Buell – The Balusters; Aya Cash as Jessie Stone – Giant; June Squibb as Marjorie – Marjorie Prime
Best Performance by a Featured Actor in a Musical	Best Performance by a Featured Actress in a Musical
Ali Louis Bourzgui as David – The Lost Boys; André De Shields as Old Deuteronomy – Cats: The Jellicle Ball; Bryce Pinkham as The Arbiter – Chess; Ben Levi Ross as Mother's Younger Brother – Ragtime; Layton Williams as Iceberg/The Seaman – Titaníque	Shoshana Bean as Lucy Emerson – The Lost Boys; Hannah Cruz as Svetlana – Chess; Rachel Dratch as The Narrator – Richard O'Brien's The Rocky Horror Show; Ana Gasteyer as Mildred Layton – Schmigadoon!; Nichelle Lewis as Sarah – Ragtime
Best Direction of a Play	Best Direction of a Musical
Joe Mantello – Death of a Salesman; Nicholas Hytner – Giant; Robert Icke – Oedipus; Kenny Leon – The Balusters; Whitney White – Liberation	Zhailon Levingston and Bill Rauch – Cats: The Jellicle Ball; Michael Arden – The Lost Boys; Lear deBessonet – Ragtime; Christopher Gattelli – Schmigadoon!; Tim Jackson – Two Strangers (Carry a Cake Across New York)
Best Book of a Musical	Best Original Score (Music and/or Lyrics) Written for the Theatre
Cinco Paul – Schmigadoon!; Jim Barne and Kit Buchan – Two Strangers (Carry a Cake Across New York); Tye Blue, Marla Mindelle, and Constantine Rousouli – Titaníque; Chris Hoch and David Hornsby – The Lost Boys	Cinco Paul (music and lyrics) – Schmigadoon!; Steve Bargonetti (music) – Joe Turner's Come and Gone; Jim Barne (music) and Kit Buchan (lyrics) – Two Strangers (Carry a Cake Across New York); The Rescues (music and lyrics) – The Lost Boys; Caroline Shaw (music) – Death of a Salesman
Best Scenic Design of a Play	Best Scenic Design of a Musical
Chloe Lamford – Death of a Salesman; Hildegard Bechtler – Oedipus; Takeshi Kata – Bug; David Korins – Dog Day Afternoon; David Rockwell – Fallen Angels	Dane Laffrey – The Lost Boys; dots – Richard O'Brien's The Rocky Horror Show; Soutra Gilmour – Two Strangers (Carry a Cake Across New York); Rachel Hauck – Cats: The Jellicle Ball; Scott Pask – Schmigadoon!
Best Costume Design of a Play	Best Costume Design of a Musical
Jeff Mahshie – Fallen Angels; Brenda Abbandandolo – Dog Day Afternoon; Qween Jean – Liberation; Emilio Sosa – The Balusters; Paul Tazewell – Joe Turner's Come and Gone	Qween Jean – Cats: The Jellicle Ball; Linda Cho – Ragtime; Linda Cho – Schmigadoon!; Ryan Park – The Lost Boys; David Reynoso – Richard O'Brien's The Rocky Horror Show
Best Lighting Design of a Play	Best Lighting Design of a Musical
Jack Knowles – Death of a Salesman; Isabella Byrd – Dog Day Afternoon; Natasha Chivers – Oedipus; Stacey Derosier – Joe Turner's Come and Gone; Heather Gilbert – Bug; Heather Gilbert – The Fear of 13	Michael Arden and Jen Schriever – The Lost Boys; Kevin Adams – Chess; Jane Cox – Richard O'Brien's The Rocky Horror Show; Donald Holder – Schmigadoon!; Donald Holder and Adam Honoré (lighting design) and 59 Studio (projection design) – Ragtime; Adam Honoré – Cats: The Jellicle Ball
Best Sound Design of a Play	Best Sound Design of a Musical
Mikaal Sulaiman – Death of a Salesman; Justin Ellington – Joe Turner's Come and Gone; Tom Gibbons – Oedipus; Lee Kinney – The Fear of 13; Josh Schmidt – Bug	Kai Harada – Ragtime; Kai Harada – Cats: The Jellicle Ball; Adam Fisher – The Lost Boys; Brian Ronan – Richard O'Brien's The Rocky Horror Show; Walter Trarbach – Schmigadoon!
Best Choreography	Best Orchestrations
Arturo Lyons and Omari Wiles – Cats: The Jellicle Ball; Christopher Gattelli – Schmigadoon!; Christopher Cree Grant and Lauren Yalango-Grant – The Lost Boys; Ellenore Scott – Ragtime; Ani Taj – Richard O'Brien's The Rocky Horror Show	Doug Besterman and Mike Morris – Schmigadoon!; Kyler England, Adrianne Gonzalez, Ethan Popp, and Gabriel Mann – The Lost Boys; Trevor Holder, Doug Schadt, Andrew Lloyd Webber, and David Wilson – Cats: The Jellicle Ball; Lux Pyramid – Two Strangers (Carry a Cake Across New York); Brian Usifer – Chess

=== Non-competitive awards ===
Accolade	Awardee(s)
Lifetime Achievement in the Theatre	André Bishop
Lifetime Achievement in the Theatre	Jules Fisher
Lifetime Achievement in the Theatre	James Lapine
Isabelle Stevenson Award	Mary-Mitchell Campbell
Special Tony Award	League of Resident Theatres
Tony Honors for Excellence in Theatre	1/52 Project
Tony Honors for Excellence in Theatre	Jake Bell
Tony Honors for Excellence in Theatre	Kenn Lubin
Tony Honors for Excellence in Theatre	Loren Plotkin
Regional Theatre Tony Award	American Players Theatre
Excellence in Theatre Education Award	Freddie Hendricks from Utopian Academy for the Arts

== Multiple nominations and awards ==
=== Productions with multiple nominations and awards ===
Nominations	Awards	Production
12	4	The Lost Boys
12	4	Schmigadoon!
11	4	Ragtime
9	3	Cats: The Jellicle Ball
9	6	Death of a Salesman
9	0	Richard O'Brien's The Rocky Horror Show
8	0	Two Strangers (Carry a Cake Across New York)
7	1	Oedipus
5	0	The Balusters
5	0	Chess
5	1	Fallen Angels
5	0	Joe Turner's Come and Gone
5	1	Liberation
4	0	Bug
4	1	Giant
4	0	Titanique
3	0	Dog Day Afternoon
2	1	Becky Shaw
2	0	Every Brilliant Thing
2	0	The Fear of 13
2	0	Marjorie Prime

=== Individuals with multiple nominations and awards ===
Nominations	Awards	Individual
2	1	Michael Arden
2	0	Jim Barne
2	0	Kit Buchan
2	0	Linda Cho
2	0	Christopher Gattelli
2	0	Heather Gilbert
2	1	Kai Harada
2	0	Donald Holder
2	0	Adam Honoré
2	1	Qween Jean
2	0	Marla Mindelle
2	2	Cinco Paul

== Presenters and performers ==
Presenters

Names	Notes
Kelli O'Hara	Presented the Lifetime Achievement in Theatre to André Bishop
Carrie Coon	Presented Excellence in Theatre Education Award to Freddie Hendricks
Kristin Chenoweth	Presented the Isabelle Stevenson Award to Mary-Mitchell Campbell
Brian Stokes Mitchell	Presented the Lifetime Achievement in the Theatre to Jules Fisher
Bernadette Peters	Presented the Lifetime Achievement in the Theatre to James Lapine and Best Musical
Maya Rudolph and Cole Escola	Presented Best Actor in a Play
Sarah Paulson	Presented Best Featured Actress in a Play
Adrien Brody	Introduced the cast of Ragtime
Rachel Zegler and Ben Platt	Presented Best Director of a Musical and Best Direction of a Play
Bowen Yang	Introduced the cast of Titaníque
Megan Thee Stallion	Presented Best Featured Actress in a Musical
Lena Waithe, Law Roach, and Jeremy Pope	Introduced the cast of Cats: The Jellicle Ball
Julia Louis-Dreyfus and Lily Rabe	Presented Best Play
Kara Young and Jack O'Brien	Appeared in the American Theater Wing segment
John Leguizamo	Introduced the cast of Two Strangers
Laura Benanti and Tituss Burgess	Presented Best Featured Actor in a Musical
Queen Latifah	Introduced Chicago performance
Annette Bening	Presented Best Actress in a Play
Sting	Presented Best Revival of Musical
Patrick Wilson	Announced Excellence in Theatre Education Award
Paul Rudd	Presented Best Featured Actor in a Play
Billy Crystal	Presented Best Revival of a Play
Trey Parker, Matt Stone, and Robert Lopez	Introduced the original Broadway cast of The Book of Mormon
Julianne Hough	Introduced Rachel Zegler's tribute to A Chorus Line
Darren Criss and Nicole Scherzinger	Presented Best Performance by a Leading Actress in a Musical and Best Performance by a Leading Actor in a Musical
Ariana DeBose and Neil Patrick Harris	Performed comedy segments during the show

Performances

Names	Song(s)
Pink, Neil Patrick Harris, Shoshana Bean, Marla Mindelle, Ann Harada, Christiani Pitts, Lea Michele, June Squibb, Megan Thee Stallion, and Broadway Inspirational Voices	"Leading Lady Marmalade"
The ensemble of Schmigadoon!	"Schmigadoon!"
The ensemble of Ragtime	Prologue: "Ragtime"
The ensemble of Titanique	"Taking Chances" / "My Heart Will Go On"
The ensemble of Cats: The Jellicle Ball	"Jellicle Songs for Jellicle Cats" / "The Jellicle Ball"
Christiani Pitts and Sam Tutty from Two Strangers (Carry a Cake Across New York)	"New York" / "American Express"
Queen Latifah, Pink, Jesse Tyler Ferguson, Alex Newell, Adrienne Warren, Cedric the Entertainer; Julianne Hough, Whitney Leavitt, Dylan Mulvaney and the ensemble of Chicago in honor of the 30th anniversary of the Broadway revival	"When You're Good to Mama" / "Cell Block Tango" / "All That Jazz"
Richard O'Brien's The Rocky Horror Show	"Sweet Transvestite" / "The Time Warp"
Leslie Odom Jr. in memoriam	"Without You" from Rent in honor of the show's 30th anniversary
The ensemble of The Lost Boys	"No More Monsters" / "Have to Have You"
The original ensemble of The Book of Mormon in honor of the show's 15th anniversary	"Man Up"
Rachel Zegler in honor of the 50th anniversary of A Chorus Line	"What I Did for Love"

== In Memoriam ==
Leslie Odom Jr. performed "Without You" from Rent during the tribute.

- Paul Libin
- Frank Dunlop
- Harriet Slaughter
- Mark Brokaw
- David Gersten
- John Conklin
- David Hays
- Richard Greenberg
- Woodie King Jr.
- Donald L. Coburn
- Roger Allers
- John Cunningham
- Elizabeth Franz
- Robert Duvall
- Robert Fox
- Arthur Whitelaw
- Sondra Lee
- Philip Langner
- Robert Wilson
- Mary Beth Hurt
- Eric Overmyer
- Ronald Ribman
- Jeffrey Lane
- Alex Bartlett
- Patricia Routledge
- Harris Yulin
- Cleo Laine
- Terence Stamp
- Carmen de Lavallade
- Diane Keaton
- Robert Redford
- Tom Stoppard

== See also ==
- 2026 Laurence Olivier Awards
- 70th Drama Desk Awards
- 2026 Outer Critics Circle Awards
- New York Drama Critics' Circle
- Theatre World Award
- 41st Lucille Lortel Awards
- Obie Award
- 92nd Drama League Awards
- Chita Rivera Awards for Dance and Choreography
