= Drama Desk Award for Outstanding Costume Design of a Musical =

American theatre award

Drama Desk Award for Outstanding Costume Design for a Musical
- Awarded for: Outstanding Costume Design for a Musical
- Location: New York City
- Country: United States
- Presented by: Drama Desk
- First award: 2016
- Currently held by: Qween Jean, Cats: The Jellicle Ball (2026)
- Website: dramadesk.org (defunct)

The Drama Desk Award for Outstanding Costume Design of a Musical is an annual award presented by Drama Desk recognize achievements in theatre across collective Broadway, off-Broadway and off-off-Broadway productions in New York City.

The award was established in 1969, with the Drama Desk Award for Outstanding Costume Design being presented each year to any play or musical production. Starting in 2016, the singular award was replaced by separate play and musical categories.

== Winners and nominees ==
Key

and bold indicates the winner.

=== 2010s ===
Year	Designer	Production	Ref.
2016
2016	**Ann Roth**	**Shuffle Along**	
2016	Jane Greenwood	Bright Star	
2016	Katrina Lindsay	American Psycho	
2016	Jeff Mahshie	She Loves Me	
2016	Alejo Vietti	Allegiance	
2017
2017	**Catherine Zuber**	**War Paint**	
2017	Linda Cho	Anastasia	
2017	Toni-Leslie James	Come from Away	
2017	Santo Loquasto	Hello, Dolly!	
2017	Anita Yavich	The View UpStairs	
2017	Paloma Young	Bandstand	
2018
2018	**Catherine Zuber**	**My Fair Lady**	
2018	Dede M. Ayite	Bella: An American Tall Tale	
2018	Gregg Barnes	Mean Girls	
2018	Clint Ramos	Once on This Island	
2018	David Zinn	SpongeBob SquarePants	
2019
2019	**Bob Mackie**	**The Cher Show**	
2019	William Ivey Long	Beetlejuice	
2019	William Ivey Long	Tootsie	
2019	Bobby Frederick Tilley II	Be More Chill	
2019	Michael Krass	Hadestown	
2019	Paloma Young	Alice by Heart	

=== 2020s ===
Year	Designer	Production	Ref.
2020
2020	**Catherine Zuber**	**Moulin Rouge!**	
2020	Vanessa Leuck	Emojiland	
2020	Jeff Mahshie	Bob & Carol & Ted & Alice	
2020	Mark Thompson	Tina: The Tina Turner Musical	
2020	Anita Yavich	Soft Power	
2021	No awards: New York theatres shuttered, March 2020 to September 2021, due to the COVID-19 pandemic in New York City		
2022
2022	**Gabriella Slade**	**Six**	
2022	Machine Dazzle	The Hang	
2022	Susan Hilferty	Funny Girl	
2022	Santo Loquasto	The Music Man	
2022	Catherine Zuber	Intimate Apparel	
2023	**Gregg Barnes**	**Some Like It Hot**	
2023	Tilly Grimes	Shucked	
2023	Jennifer Moeller	Camelot	
2023	Clint Ramos & Sophia Choi	KPOP	
2023	Anita Yavich	Only Gold	
2024	**Paul Tazewell**	**Suffs**	
2024	Dede Ayite	Buena Vista Social Club	
2024	Márion Talán de la Rosa	The Connector	
2024	Loren Elstein	Once Upon a One More Time	
2024	David Israel Reynoso	Water for Elephants	
2025
2025	**Gregg Barnes**	Boop! The Musical	
2025	Sarah Cubbage	The Big Gay Jamboree	
2025	Toni-Leslie James	Gypsy	
2025	Qween Jean	Cats: "The Jellicle Ball"	
2025	Paul Tazewell	Death Becomes Her	
2025	Catherine Zuber	Just in Time	
2026
2026	**Qween Jean**	**Cats: The Jellicle Ball**	
2026	Qween Jean	Saturday Church	
2026	David I. Reynoso	The Rocky Horror Show	
2026	Kaye Voyce	The Seat of Our Pants	
2026	Catherine Zuber	The Baker's Wife	

== Multiple wins ==
3 wins

- Catherine Zuber

2 wins

- Gregg Barnes

== Multiple nominations ==
6 nominations

- Catherine Zuber

3 nominations

- Gregg Barnes
- Qween Jean

2 nominations

- Clint Ramos
- Toni-Leslie James
- Santo Loquasto
- Paloma Young
- Jeff Mahshie
- Anita Yavich
- Dede Ayite

== See also ==
- Drama Desk Award for Outstanding Costume Design of a Play
- Laurence Olivier Award for Best Costume Design
- Tony Award for Best Costume Design in a Musical
