= List of awards and nominations received by Kinky Boots (musical) =

Kinky Boots is a musical that opened on Broadway in 2013, winning the Tony Award for Best Musical and various other awards that season. The show has a book by Harvey Fierstein and songs by Cyndi Lauper. Kinky Boots is based on the 2005 British film of the same name, which was, in turn, inspired by a true story.

The original production was directed and choreographed by Jerry Mitchell and orchestrated by Stephen Oremus. Scenic design was by David Rockwell, costumes by Gregg Barnes, lighting by Kenneth Posner and sound by John Shivers. The cast starred Billy Porter as Lola and Stark Sands as Charlie and featured Annaleigh Ashford as Lauren.

Early in the 2013 awards season, Kinky Boots did well, receiving Drama League Award nominations for Distinguished Production of a Musical and Distinguished Performance, for both Porter and Sands, and winning for Distinguished Production. The show received nine Outer Critics Circle Award nominations, winning three, including Outstanding New Broadway Musical, Outstanding New Score and Outstanding Actor in a Musical (Porter). The musical received only two Drama Desk Award nominations, however, and only one win: Porter for Outstanding Actor in a Musical.

Kinky Boots received a season-high 13 Tony Award nominations. Matilda, which The New York Times described as the "unalloyed critical hit" of the season, received 12 nominations, 11 of them in the same categories as Kinky Boots. In addition to its critical success, Matilda had won the Drama Desk Award for outstanding musical and had set a record by winning the most Olivier Awards in history. Nevertheless, Kinky Boots won a season-high six Tonys, including Best Musical, which the press described as an upset, and Lauper's win for Best Score made her the first woman to win alone in that category. The creative team are Americans, and reviewer David Cote, an American writing in The Guardian, judged that the show's win was a case of "the balance of love going to a homegrown American musical, Kinky Boots, over the British import Matilda." Kinky Boots also won the 2013 Artios Award for Outstanding Achievement in Casting in the Broadway musical category.

Kinky Boots won the award for Best Musical Theater Album at the Grammy Awards in January 2014.

== Awards and nominations ==
=== Original Broadway production ===
Year	Award	Category	Nominee	Result
2013	Drama League Award	Distinguished Production of a Musical		Won
2013	Drama League Award	Distinguished Performance	Billy Porter	Nominated
2013	Drama League Award	Distinguished Performance	Stark Sands	Nominated
2013	Outer Critics Circle Award	Outstanding New Broadway Musical		Won
2013	Outer Critics Circle Award	Outstanding Book of a Musical (Broadway or Off-Broadway)	Harvey Fierstein	Nominated
2013	Outer Critics Circle Award	Outstanding New Score (Broadway or Off-Broadway)	Cyndi Lauper	Won
2013	Outer Critics Circle Award	Outstanding Director of a Musical	Jerry Mitchell	Nominated
2013	Outer Critics Circle Award	Outstanding Choreographer	Jerry Mitchell	Nominated
2013	Outer Critics Circle Award	Outstanding Costume Design (Play or Musical)	Gregg Barnes	Nominated
2013	Outer Critics Circle Award	Outstanding Actor in a Musical	Billy Porter	Won
2013	Outer Critics Circle Award	Outstanding Featured Actor in a Musical	Daniel Stewart Sherman	Nominated
2013	Outer Critics Circle Award	Outstanding Featured Actress in a Musical	Annaleigh Ashford	Nominated
2013	Drama Desk Award	Outstanding Actor in a Musical	Billy Porter	Won
2013	Drama Desk Award	Outstanding Featured Actress in a Musical	Annaleigh Ashford	Nominated
2013	Tony Award	Best Musical		Won
2013	Tony Award	Best Book of a Musical	Harvey Fierstein	Nominated
2013	Tony Award	Best Original Score	Cyndi Lauper	Won
2013	Tony Award	Best Actor in a Musical	Billy Porter	Won
2013	Tony Award	Best Actor in a Musical	Stark Sands	Nominated
2013	Tony Award	Best Featured Actress in a Musical	Annaleigh Ashford	Nominated
2013	Tony Award	Best Scenic Design of a Musical	David Rockwell	Nominated
2013	Tony Award	Best Costume Design of a Musical	Gregg Barnes	Nominated
2013	Tony Award	Best Lighting Design of a Musical	Kenneth Posner	Nominated
2013	Tony Award	Best Sound Design of a Musical	John Shivers	Won
2013	Tony Award	Best Direction of a Musical	Jerry Mitchell	Nominated
2013	Tony Award	Best Choreography	Jerry Mitchell	Won
2013	Tony Award	Best Orchestrations	Stephen Oremus	Won
2013	Artios Award	Outstanding Achievement in Casting	Bernard Telsey & Justin Huff	Won
2013	Astaire Awards	Outstanding Choreographer in a Broadway Show	Jerry Mitchell	Nominated
2013	Astaire Awards	Outstanding Male Dancer in a Broadway Show	Billy Porter	Nominated
2013	Astaire Awards	Outstanding Male Dancer in a Broadway Show	Charlie Sutton	Nominated
2014	Grammy Award	Best Musical Theater Album		Won

=== Original West End Production ===
Year	Award	Category	Nominee	Result
2015	Evening Standard Awards	Best Musical		Won
2015	Evening Standard Awards	Best Musical Performance	Killian Donnelly	Nominated
2017	Laurence Olivier Award	Best New Musical		Won
2017	Laurence Olivier Award	Best Actor in a Musical	Killian Donnelly	Nominated
2017	Laurence Olivier Award	Best Actor in a Musical	Matt Henry	Won
2017	Laurence Olivier Award	Best Actress in a Supporting Role in a Musical	Amy Lennox	Nominated
2017	Laurence Olivier Award	Best Theatre Choreographer	Jerry Mitchell	Nominated
2017	Laurence Olivier Award	Best Costume Design	Gregg Barnes	Won
2017	Laurence Olivier Award	Outstanding Achievement in Music	Cyndi Lauper & Stephen Oremus	Nominated
2017	Grammy Award	Best Musical Theater Album		Nominated

=== Original Australian production ===
Year	Award	Category	Nominee	Result
2017	Helpmann Awards	Best Musical		Nominated
2017	Helpmann Awards	Best Music Direction	Luke Hunter	Nominated
2017	Helpmann Awards	Best Choreography in a Musical	Jerry Mitchell	Won
2017	Helpmann Awards	Best Direction of a Musical	Jerry Mitchell	Nominated
2017	Helpmann Awards	Best Female Actor in a Musical	Sophie Wright	Nominated
2017	Helpmann Awards	Best Female Actor in a Supporting Role in a Musical	Teegan Wouters	Nominated
2017	Helpmann Awards	Best Male Actor in a Musical	Callum Francis	Won
