= Drama Desk Award for Outstanding Costume Design of a Play =

American theatre award

- Awarded for: Outstanding Costume Design of a Play
- Location: New York City
- Country: United States
- Presented by: Drama Desk
- First award: 2016
- Currently held by: Paul Tazewell for Joe Turner’s Come and Gone (2026)
- Website: dramadesk.org (defunct)

The Drama Desk Award for Outstanding Costume Design of a Play is an annual award presented by Drama Desk in recognition of achievements in theatre across collective Broadway, off-Broadway and off-off-Broadway productions in New York City.

The award was established in 1969, with the Drama Desk Award for Outstanding Costume Design being presented each year to any play or musical production. Starting in 2016, the singular award was replaced by separate play and musical categories.

Dede M. Ayite has received the most nominations in the category, with four, followed closely by Toni-Leslie James with three and Ann Roth, Emilio Sosa, Qween Jean and Enver Chakartash with two each. No designer has won the award multiple times.

== Winners and nominees ==
Key

and bold indicates the winner.

=== 2010s ===
Year	Designer	Production
2016
2016	**Anita Yavich**	**The Legend of Georgia McBride**
2016	Jessica Ford	These Paper Bullets!
2016	Martha Hally	Women Without Men
2016	Constance Hoffman	Pericles
2016	William Ivey Long	Shows for Days
2017
2017	**Jane Greenwood**	**The Little Foxes**
2017	Susan Hilferty	Present Laughter
2017	Murell Horton	The Liar
2017	Toni-Leslie James	Jitney
2017	Stewart Laing	The Hairy Ape
2017	Ann Roth	The Front Page
2018
2018	**Jonathan Fensom**	**Farinelli and the King**
2018	Dede M. Ayite	School Girls; Or, The African Mean Girls Play
2018	Katrina Lindsay	Harry Potter and the Cursed Child
2018	Ann Roth	Three Tall Women
2018	Emilio Sosa	Venus
2019
2019	**Toni-Leslie James**	**Bernhardt/Hamlet**
2019	Dede M. Ayite	By the Way, Meet Vera Stark
2019	Dede M. Ayite	If Pretty Hurts Ugly Must Be a Muhfucka
2019	Ásta Bennie Hostetter	Mrs. Murray's Menagerie
2019	Nicole Slaven	Henry VI: Shakespeare's Trilogy in Two Parts

=== 2020s ===
Year	Designer	Production
2020
2020	**Rachel Townsend and Jessica Jahn**	**The Confession of Lily Dare**
2020	Asa Benally	Blues for an Alabama Sky
2020	Montana Levi Blanco	Fefu and Her Friends
2020	Toni-Leslie James	for colored girls who have considered suicide/when the rainbow is enuf
2020	Antony McDonald	Judgment Day
2020	Kaye Voyce	Coriolanus
2021	No awards: New York theatres shuttered, March 2020 to September 2021, due to the COVID-19 pandemic in New York City	
2022
2022	**Jennifer Moeller**	**Clyde's**
2022	Linda Cho	The Chinese Lady
2022	Gregory Gale	Fairycakes
2022	Tilly Grimes	The Alchemist
2022	Qween Jean	On Sugarland
2023	**Emilio Sosa**	**Ain't No Mo'**
2023	Kara Branch	According to the Chorus
2023	Enver Chakartash	Public Obscenities
2023	Qween Jean	Wedding Band
2023	Sarah Laux	Wish You Were Here
2023	Roberto Surace	Peter Pan Goes Wrong
2024	**Enver Chakartash**	**Stereophonic**
2024	Alex Berry	Macbeth (an undoing)
2024	Karen Boyer	Warrior Sisters of Wu
2024	Lux Haac	Manahatta
2024	Rodrigo Muñoz	Sally & Tom
2025
2025	**Dede Ayite**	**Our Town**
2025	Brenda Abbandandolo	The Antiquities
2025	Christopher Ford	The Beastiary
2025	Camilla Lind	Dark Noon
2025	Karl Ruckdeschel	Twelfth Night
2026
2026	**Paul Tazewell**	**Joe Turner's Come and Gone**
2026	Kindall Almond	Initiative
2026	Enver Chakartash	Meet the Cartozians
2026	Enver Chakartash	Tartuffe
2026	Qween Jean	Oh, Happy Day!
2026	Emilio Sosa	The Balusters

== Multiple nominations ==
4 nominations

- Dede Ayite
- Enver Chakartash

3 nominations

- Toni-Leslie James
- Qween Jean
- Emilio Sosa

2 nominations

- Ann Roth

== See also ==
- Drama Desk Award for Outstanding Costume Design of a Musical
- Laurence Olivier Award for Best Costume Design
- Tony Award for Best Costume Design in a Play
