= Clint Ramos =

Filipino-American costume and set designer

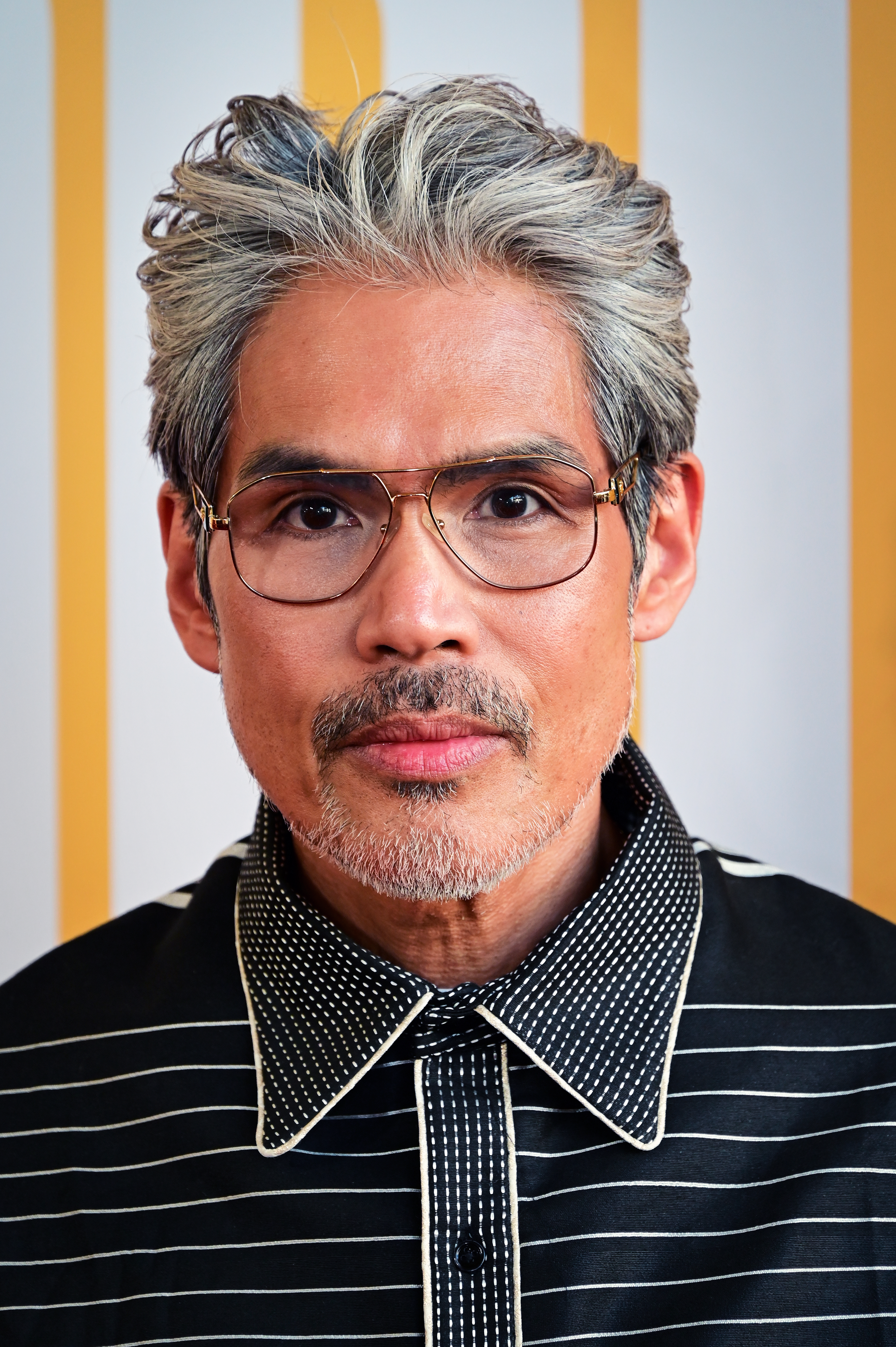
- Ramos in 2026
- Born: Cebu, Philippines
- Education: University of the Philippines, Diliman (BA); New York University (MFA)

Clint Ramos is a Filipino-American costume and set designer for stage and screen. For his work on the 2016 Broadway production of Eclipsed, he became the first person of color to win the Tony Award for Best Costume Design in a Play.

Ramos has hundreds of credits including working as a costume designer on the film Respect (2021) for MGM Studios, starring Jennifer Hudson, and production and costume designer on Lingua Franca (2019), directed by Isabel Sandoval. He has received four additional Tony Award nominations for his work on the 2018 Broadway revival of Once on This Island, the 2019 Broadway revival of Torch Song, the 2020 Broadway revival of The Rose Tattoo, and Slave Play (nominated for Set Design).

He was costume director for the 2013 worldwide premiere production at New York's Public Theater of the David Byrne and Fatboy Slim disco-pop musical Here Lies Love and he reprised that role as well as that of producer in the 2023 Broadway revival.

== Professional background ==
Born in Cebu, Philippines, Ramos studied Theatre Arts at the University of the Philippines Diliman. He got involved in costume design through the university's theatre society, Dulaang UP. He moved to the United States in 1993 where he was awarded a scholarship to NYU Tisch, going on to graduate with a Master of Fine Arts in Design in 1997.

Ramos has given lectures at NYU Tisch and Fordham University, where he was Head of Theater Design.

In 2022, he was featured in the book 50 Key Figures in Queer US Theatre, with a profile written by theatre scholar Jimmy A. Noriega.

== Awards and nominations ==
Year	Award	Category	Work	Result
2010	Drama Desk Award	Outstanding Costume Design	So Help Me God	Nominated
2010	Lucille Lortel Award	Outstanding Costume Design	So Help Me God	Won
2013	Lucille Lortel Award	Outstanding Costume Design	Wild With Happy	Nominated
2013	Lucille Lortel Award	Outstanding Scenic Design	Wild With Happy	Won
2013	OBIE Award	Sustained Achievement in Design	Body of Work	Won
2014	Lucille Lortel Award	Outstanding Costume Design	Here Lies Love	Won
2014	Helen Hayes Award	Outstanding Set Design	Appropriate	Won
2016	Tony Award	Best Costume Design in a Play	Eclipsed	Won
2018	Tony Award	Best Costume Design in a Musical	Once on This Island	Nominated
2018	Outer Critics Circle Award	Costume Design in a Musical	Once on This Island	Nominated
2018	Drama Desk Award	Outstanding Costume Design of a Musical	Once on This Island	Nominated
2019	Tony Award	Best Costume Design in a Play	Torch Song	Nominated
2019	OBIE Award	Achievement in Scenic Design	Wild Goose Dreams	Won
2020	Drama Desk Award	Outstanding Scenic Design of a Musical	Soft Power	Nominated
2020	Drama Desk Award	Outstanding Scenic Design of a Play	Grand Horizons	Won
2020	Outer Critics Award	Outstanding Scenic Design for a Play	Grand Horizons	Won
2020	United States Artists	2020 Fellow for Theatre	Body of Work	Recipient
2020	Tony Award	Best Scenic Design of a Play	Slave Play	Nominated
2020	Tony Award	Best Costume Design in a Play	The Rose Tattoo	Nominated
2023	Tony Award	Best Costume Design in a Musical	KPOP	Nominated
2025	Tony Award	Best Costume Design in a Musical	Maybe Happy Ending	Nominated
