= Catherine Zuber =

American costume designer

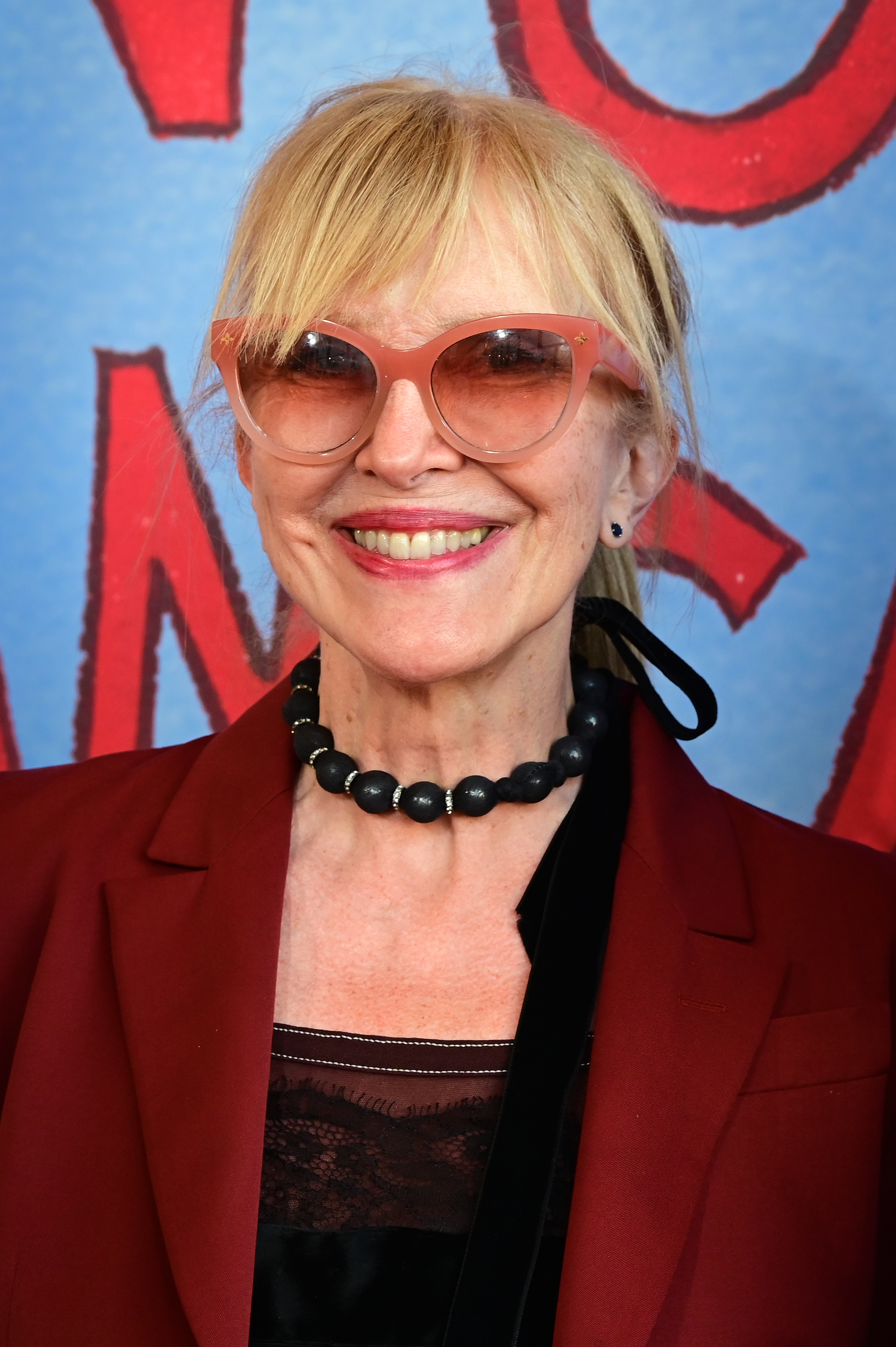
- Zuber in 2026

Catherine Zuber is a costume designer for the Broadway theater and opera, among other venues. She is a graduate of the Yale School of Drama, and has been referred to as "one of theater's most sought-after costume designers on both coasts."

== Life and early career ==
Zuber was born in England, and came with her family to New York City when she was 9 years old. Her first choice of career was photography, but she switched to costume design because she found photography to be "a lonely art form". In addition, she enjoyed the collaborative nature of working in the theatre.

== Broadway ==
Zuber's Broadway credits include How to Succeed in Business Without Really Trying (Tony nomination), Born Yesterday (Tony nomination), Women on the Verge of a Nervous Breakdown, South Pacific (Tony Award), The Coast of Utopia (Tony Award), The Light in the Piazza (Tony Award), Edward Albee's Seascape (Tony nomination), Awake and Sing! (Tony Award), Joe Turner's Come and Gone (Outer Critics Circle nomination), The Royal Family (Tony Award, Outer Critics Circle nomination), Oleanna, A Man for All Seasons, Cry-Baby, Mauritius, Doubt, Little Women, Dracula, Frozen, Dinner at Eight (Tony, Outer Critics Circle and Drama Desk nominations), Twelfth Night (Tony and Drama Desk nominations), Ivanov, Triumph of Love (Drama Desk nomination), The Sound of Music and The Red Shoes among others.

== Opera ==
Zuber's opera credits include Le comte Ory, Il Barbiere di Siviglia, Doctor Atomic, The 125th Anniversary Gala, Les Contes d'Hoffmann (The Metropolitan Opera), Two Boys, Carmen (ENO), Roméo et Juliette (Salzburger Festspiele), and Der Ring des Nibelungen (Washington National Opera and San Francisco Opera).

== Off-Broadway ==
Zuber's Off-Broadway credits include BAM/Old Vic's, The Bridge Project consisting of The Cherry Orchard (2009), The Winter's Tale (2009), As You Like It (2010), The Tempest (2010) and Richard III (2012),

She has designed costumes for some 57 Off-Broadway plays and musicals, recently including Oslo in 2016 at Lincoln Center Theater and Incognito in 2016 at the Manhattan Theatre Club New York City Center-Stage I.

== Awards and nominations ==
Zuber has been nominated 15 times for a Tony Award, and has won eight times. In addition, she received the 2003 and 2004 Henry Hewes Award for Outstanding Costume Design.

Year	Award	Category	Work	Result
1997	Obie Award	Sustained Excellence of Costume Design		Honoree
1998	Drama Desk Award	Outstanding Costume Design	Ivanov	Nominated
1998	Drama Desk Award	Outstanding Costume Design	Triumph of Love	Nominated
1999	Tony Award	Best Costume Design	Twelfth Night	Nominated
1999	Drama Desk Award	Outstanding Costume Design	Twelfth Night	Nominated
2003	Tony Award	Best Costume Design	Dinner at Eight	Nominated
2003	Drama Desk Award	Outstanding Costume Design	Dinner at Eight	Nominated
2003	Outer Critics Circle Award	Outstanding Costume Design	Dinner at Eight	Nominated
2003	Lucille Lortel Award	Outstanding Costume Design	Far Away	Nominated
2004	Lucille Lortel Award	Outstanding Costume Design	The Beard of Avon	Won
2004	Drama Desk Award	Outstanding Costume Design	Intimate Apparel	Nominated
2004	Outer Critics Circle Award	Outstanding Costume Design	Intimate Apparel	Nominated
2004	Ovation Award	Costume Design (Larger Theatre)	Intimate Apparel	Won
2005	Lucille Lortel Award	Outstanding Costume Design	Intimate Apparel	Won
2005	Tony Award	Best Costume Design in a Musical	The Light in the Piazza	Won
2005	Drama Desk Award	Outstanding Costume Design	The Light in the Piazza	Nominated
2005	Outer Critics Circle Award	Outstanding Costume Design	The Light in the Piazza	Nominated
2005	Obie Award	Costume Design	Engaged	Won
2006	Tony Award	Best Costume Design in a Play	Awake and Sing!	Won
2006	Tony Award	Best Costume Design in a Play	Edward Albee's Seascape	Nominated
2007	Tony Award	Best Costume Design in a Play	The Coast of Utopia	Won
2007	Drama Desk Award	Outstanding Costume Design	The Coast of Utopia	Won
2007	Outer Critics Circle Award	Outstanding Costume Design	The Coast of Utopia	Won
2008	Tony Award	Best Costume Design in a Musical	South Pacific	Won
2008	Outer Critics Circle Award	Outstanding Costume Design	South Pacific	Nominated
2009	Outer Critics Circle Award	Outstanding Costume Design	Joe Turner's Come and Gone	Nominated
2010	Tony Award	Best Costume Design in a Play	The Royal Family	Won
2010	Outer Critics Circle Award	Outstanding Costume Design	The Royal Family	Nominated
2011	Tony Award	Best Costume Design in a Play	Born Yesterday	Nominated
2011	Tony Award	Best Costume Design in a Musical	How to Succeed in Business Without Really Trying	Nominated
2012	Olivier Award	Best Costume Design	South Pacific	Nominated
2012	Drama Desk Award	Outstanding Costume Design	Death Takes a Holiday	Nominated
2012	Lucille Lortel Award	Outstanding Costume Design	Death Takes a Holiday	Nominated
2013	Tony Award	Best Costume Design in a Play	Golden Boy	Nominated
2014	Lucille Lortel Award	Outstanding Costume Design	Far from Heaven	Nominated
2015	Tony Award	Best Costume Design in a Musical	The King and I	Won
2015	Outer Critics Circle Award	Outstanding Costume Design	The King and I	Won
2015	Drama Desk Award	Outstanding Costume Design	Gigi	Won
2017	Tony Award	Best Costume Design in a Musical	War Paint	Nominated
2017	Drama Desk Award	Outstanding Costume Design of a Musical	War Paint	Won
2017	Outer Critics Circle Award	Outstanding Costume Design	War Paint	Won
2018	Tony Award	Best Costume Design in a Musical	My Fair Lady	Won
2018	Drama Desk Award	Outstanding Costume Design of a Musical	My Fair Lady	Won
2018	Outer Critics Circle Award	Outstanding Costume Design	My Fair Lady	Won
2019	Olivier Award	Best Costume Design	The King and I	Won
2019	IRNE Award	Best Costume Design	Moulin Rouge!	Won
2020	Tony Award	Best Costume Design in a Musical	Moulin Rouge!	Won
2020	Drama Desk Award	Outstanding Costume Design of a Musical	Moulin Rouge!	Won
2020	Outer Critics Circle Award	Outstanding Costume Design	Moulin Rouge!	Honoree
2022	Drama Desk Award	Outstanding Costume Design of a Musical	Intimate Apparel	Nominated
2022	Outer Critics Circle Awards	Outstanding Costume Design (Play or Musical)	Mrs. Doubtfire	Nominated

== Other ==
Her other work includes Fête des Vignerons (1999 Vevey, Switzerland).
