= War Paint (musical) =

- Music: Scott Frankel
- Lyrics: Michael Korie
- Book: Doug Wright
- Basis: 2004 book War Paint by Lindy Woodhead; 2007 film The Powder & the Glory by Ann Carol Grossman & Arnie Reisman
- Premiere: July 18, 2016: Goodman Theatre, Chicago
- Productions: 2016 Chicago; 2017 Broadway

War Paint is a musical with music by Scott Frankel, lyrics by Michael Korie, and a book by Doug Wright. It is based both on Lindy Woodhead's 2004 book War Paint and on the 2007 documentary film The Powder & the Glory by Ann Carol Grossman and Arnie Reisman.

The musical focuses on the lives of and rivalry between 20th-century female entrepreneurs Elizabeth Arden and Helena Rubinstein.

== Overview ==
The musical relates the rivalry between two important women of the cosmetics industry, Elizabeth Arden and Helena Rubinstein, from the 1930s to the 1960s. Elizabeth Arden was the daughter of a Canadian farmer and presented her products as emblems of an upper-class life of comfort. Helena Rubinstein, from Poland, "emphasized science", promising an "exotic look." That was "code for Jewish" according to Scott Frankel.

Doug Wright noted: "Together, they not only forged an industry, but a way of life...They absolutely shattered glass ceilings as women in industry." Frankel, explaining the musical style, said: "I'm a huge fan of music from the 1930s, '40s, '50s and '60s and, without making it a pastiche, I soaked my brain in the fluids of those periods to see what absorbed naturally."

== Productions ==
On November 12, 2015 the Goodman Theatre in Chicago announced its hosting of the world premiere of War Paint which under the direction of Michael Greif previewed from June 28, 2016 prior to its official July 18-August 21, 2016 run. Composer Scott Frankel, lyricist Michael Korie, and bookwriter Doug Wright had previously worked together on the 2006 Broadway musical Grey Gardens. The production starred Patti LuPone as Rubinstein and Christine Ebersole as Arden, with John Dossett as Tommy Lewis, Arden's husband, Douglas Sills, as Harry Fleming, Rubinstein's confidante, and Erik Liberman as Revlon founder Charles Revson. The musical featured scenic design by David Korins, costume design by Catherine Zuber, lighting design by Kenneth Posner, sound design by Brian Ronan, orchestrations by Bruce Coughlin, and choreography by Christopher Gattelli.

On October 13, 2016 it was announced that War Paint would be produced on Broadway playing at the Nederlander Theatre in previews from March 7, 2017 and officially opening April 6. Additional featured cast includes Dossett, Sills, and Liberman reprising their roles from the Chicago production. After strong box office returns in the first weeks of its run War Paint failed to retain an audience draw into the summer and in mid-September a December 30, 2017 closing date was posted: the musical's closing would in fact be moved up to November 5, 2017, to accommodate LuPone's need for hip replacement surgery. Including previews, War Paint played on Broadway for 269 performances.

The Broadway production received 4 Tony Award nominations. Both Christine Ebersole and Patti LuPone were nominated for Best Actress in a Musical, David Korins for Best Scenic Design of a Musical and Catherine Zuber for Best Costume Design of a Musical.

== Cast ==
Source: Internet Broadway Database

Character	Chicago (2016)	Broadway (2017)
Helena Rubinstein	Patti LuPone	Patti LuPone
Elizabeth Arden	Christine Ebersole	Christine Ebersole
Tommy Lewis	John Dossett	John Dossett
Harry Fleming	Douglas Sills	Douglas Sills
The Society Doyenne and others	Mary Ernster	Mary Ernster
Senator Royal Copeland, William S. Paley and others	David Girolmo	David Girolmo
The Countess and others	Joanna Glushak	Joanna Glushak
Mr. Simms and others	Chris Hoch	Chris Hoch
Miss Beam and others	Mary Claire King	Mary Claire King
Dorian Leigh and others	Steffanie Leigh	Steffanie Leigh
Charles Revson and others	Erik Liberman	Erik Liberman
The Grand Dame and others	Barbara Marineau	Barbara Marineau
Beauty Technician and others	Stephanie Jae Park	Stephanie Jae Park
Miss Smythe and others	Angel Reda	Angel Reda
Miss Teale and others	Leslie Donna Flesner	Jennifer Rias

== Plot summary ==
=== Act I ===
In 1935 Manhattan, several society women fret over the beauty ideals imposed on them by an unforgiving culture ("Best Face Forward"). A red door beckons them inside Elizabeth Arden's salon, where they are greeted by the Arden Girls and then by Elizabeth Arden herself ("Behind the Red Door"). Elizabeth's husband Tommy informs her that Helena Rubinstein plans to relaunch her company in America. Meanwhile, Helena arrives in Manhattan with her marketing director Harry Fleming and tells him that, while she's never met Elizabeth in person, she still plans to undo her ("Back on Top").

When Helena extols her latest face cream, an unfazed Elizabeth reassures Tommy that her iconic pink packaging will always trump pseudo-science. Harry urges Helena to market her cream as two separate products: one for the daytime and one for the nighttime. Helena consents, causing her sales to surpass Elizabeth's. Tommy urges Elizabeth to give him a promotion, but she is reluctant to do so because she believes it will make her look weak ("My Secret Weapon").

One night, while having dinner at the St. Regis Hotel, Elizabeth overhears Helena and Harry talking in an adjoining banquette. She learns that Helena longs for inclusion and that Harry feels undervalued ("My American Moment"). When Harry storms off after Helena mentions her knowing about his late-night trysts, Elizabeth gives him her card and invites him to a job interview.

Sometime later, Harry meets with Elizabeth and insists on working as her Vice President of Sales. Despite her initial reluctance, Elizabeth agrees to Harry's demands after Tommy walks in on them. Harry tells Helena about his new job and hits the town with an errant sailor while Tommy enjoys a night out with several of the Arden Girls. When Elizabeth catches him in the steam room with one of the girls, she promptly fires him and demands a divorce ("Step on Out"). Both women wonder what their lives would be had they been born male ("If I'd Been a Man").

While receiving a visit from nail polish salesman Charles Revson and his hand model Dorian Leigh, Elizabeth becomes intrigued with Dorian as she sees vestiges of her former self in the up-and-comer ("Better Yourself"). Meanwhile, after being approached by Tommy about a job, Helena suggests they work together to destroy Elizabeth's reputation by telling the FDA her skin cream doubles as horse salve ("Oh, That's Rich").

In 1939 Washington, D.C., Elizabeth appears at a Senate Committee hearing and offers a spirited defense to committee chairman Senator Royal Copeland. Fully aware that Tommy deliberately sold her out, Elizabeth reports Helena and forces her to testify before the committee. Following Helena's testimony, however, Copeland chides both women and claims their efforts to undermine one another only resulted in them incriminating themselves. Alone and bereft, the two wonder what it would be like if they actually met ("Face to Face").

=== Act II ===
As dismayed society ladies across Manhattan read the obligatory labels on Arden and Rubinstein products ("Inside of the Jar"), both women discover that war has broken out in Europe. Helena decides to buoy the spirits of women dedicated to the war effort with a brand new line while Elizabeth learns that the War Office is rationing silk and nylon and vows to do her part by inventing products without them ("Necessity Is the Mother of Invention").

In the post-war years, both women thrive financially and open salons in fashionable neighborhoods across America ("Best Face Forward [Reprise]"). One day, Helena is dining at the St. Regis when she learns she lost the bid on a Park Avenue penthouse because its board of directors finds her too Jewish. She overhears Elizabeth being rejected by the elite Mayfair Club because they find her too nouveau riche and gloats over her rival getting a much-needed taste of her own prejudice ("Now You Know").

In the 1950s, Tommy and Harry urge their respective employers to update their ad campaigns. When CBS president Bill Paley offers them sponsorship of the new game show "The $64,000 Question," both women refuse ("No Thank You"). During the show's premiere, they are shocked to learn that the sponsor is Charles Revson's newly formed company Revlon, which features Dorian Leigh in an ad campaign that celebrates sex appeal ("Fire and Ice").

Following the premiere, Helena fires Tommy for failing to alert her to the danger Revlon now poses while Elizabeth fires Harry when he dares to say "I told you so." Both men commiserate at a bar, fully aware that their former employers are digging their own graves by failing to keep up with the times ("Dinosaurs").

Several years later, Elizabeth's Board of Directors pressures her to name a successor, prompting her to opine about how her entire résumé has been pared down to her patented color ("Pink"). Helena, meanwhile, is pressured by her attorneys to save on taxes by donating her large portrait collection. She refuses, insisting that, unlike the creams she spent her entire life championing, the paintings are what preserve her immortality ("Forever Beautiful").

At a gala organized by the American Women's Association in 1964, both women find themselves face to face after being accidentally invited to deliver the keynote address. The two argue until Helena notices that Elizabeth is wearing a shade of her lipstick. The two eventually realize that they had a shared goal that surpassed their bitter rivalry ("Beauty in the World"). As they are ushered to the stage, their handler Tulip thanks the former cosmetics moguls for "all you've done to – I mean for – women." Upon hearing this, both women pause and wonder who will defend beauty in an ever-coarsening world ("Finale").

== Musical numbers ==
=== Goodman Theatre (2016) ===
Act I

- "A Woman's Face" – Helena Rubinstein, Elizabeth Arden, Society Doyenne, Grand Dame, Heiress & Countess
- "Behind the Red Door" – Arden Girls, Society Doyenne, Grand Dame, Heiress, Countess & Elizabeth
- "Back on Top" – Helena & Beauty Technicians
- "Hope in a Jar" – Harry Fleming, Helena, Society Doyenne, Grand Dame, Heiress, Countess, Elizabeth, Tommy Lewis, Arden Girls & Bergdorf Goodman Customers
- "A Working Marriage" – Elizabeth & Tommy
- "My American Moment" – Helena & Elizabeth
- "Step on Out" – Arden Girls, Miss Beam, Tommy & Harry
- "If I'd Been a Man" – Elizabeth & Helena
- "Better Yourself" – Elizabeth
- "Oh, That's Rich" – Tommy, Helena, Harry & Elizabeth
- "Face to Face" – Helena & Elizabeth

Act II

- "War Paint" – Helena, Elizabeth, Women Factory Workers, Eleanor Roosevelt, WACs & Flagbearers
- "A Woman's Face (Reprise)" – Countess, Society Doyenne, Heiress, Grand Dame, Young Mother & Other Branch Salon Clients
- "Now You Know" – Helena
- "No Thank You" – Harry, Elizabeth, Tommy, Helena & William S. Paley
- "Fire and Ice" - Charles Revson, Dorian Leigh, Mirror Girls, Helena, Elizabeth, Harry & Tommy
- "Face to Face (Reprise)" – Helena & Elizabeth
- "Dinosaurs" – Tommy & Harry
- "Pink" – Elizabeth
- "Forever Beautiful" – Helena
- "Beauty in the World" – Helena & Elizabeth
- "A Woman's Face (Reprise)" – Company

=== Original Broadway production (2017) ===
Act I

- "Best Face Forward" – Countess, Grand Dame, Heiress, Society Doyenne & Ensemble
- "Behind the Red Door" – Arden Girls, Countess, Grand Dame, Heiress, Society Doyenne, & Elizabeth Arden
- "Back on Top" – Helena Rubinstein & Beauty Technicians
- "My Secret Weapon" – Helena, Harry Fleming, Elizabeth, Tommy Lewis, Society Doyenne, Grand Dame, Heiress, Countess & Arden Girls
- "My American Moment" – Helena & Elizabeth
- "Step on Out" – Arden Girls, Miss Beam, Tommy & Harry
- "If I'd Been a Man" – Elizabeth & Helena
- "Better Yourself" – Elizabeth
- "Oh, That's Rich" – Tommy, Helena, Elizabeth & Harry
- "Face to Face" – Helena & Elizabeth

Act II

- "Inside of the Jar" – Countess, Grand Dame, Heiress, Society Doyenne, Shoppers & Salesgirls
- "Necessity is the Mother of Invention" – Elizabeth, Helena, Women Machinists, WACs, Tommy, Harry & Soldiers
- "Best Face Forward (Reprise)" - Countess, Society Doyenne, Grand Dame, Heiress & Branch Salon Clients
- "Now You Know" – Helena
- "No Thank You" – Harry, Elizabeth, Tommy, Helena & William S. Paley
- "Fire and Ice" - Charles Revson, Dorian Leigh & Mirror Girls
- "Dinosaurs" – Tommy & Harry
- "Pink" – Elizabeth
- "Forever Beautiful" – Helena
- "Beauty in the World" – Helena & Elizabeth
- "Finale" - Helena & Elizabeth

== Reception ==
=== Critical response ===
In his review of the Chicago production, Peter Marks in The Washington Post praised LuPone and Ebersole and the score: "LuPone and Ebersole wrap their prodigious voices around a score by Scott Frankel and Michael Korie that rings with the kind of exhilaratingly brassy notes that match the chutzpah of their characters' ambitions... In the twilight is where both LuPone's and Ebersole's performances gain their essential poignancy..." and the story line: "War Paint conveys with tremendous authority what it must have been like for both women to have assumed the traditionally masculine role of running a major company..."

The Broadway production of War Paint typically received what were deemed mixed reviews with critics seemingly unanimous in praise for stars LuPone and Ebersole but generally less enthused about the overall production, as posited by HuffPost critic Christian Lewis: "War Paint certainly is not a revolutionary (or even a very well-written or conceived) musical"... "[but while] the show itself and the cast as a whole may be lackluster and flawed [its two] leading ladies are certainly deserving of praise[:] Lupone [is] hilariously campy and intense[;] Ebersole,...serious and passionate"..."In reality War Paint is a glorified concert for Ebersole and LuPone"..."[whose] magnificent performances...are an absolute must-see"..."[although] these vocal powerhouses cannot...fully [redeem] this flawed musical with its bad lyrics, lazy staging, and entirely bland supporting cast."

=== Accolades ===
Original Broadway Production

Year	Award	Category	Nominee	Result
2017	Tony Awards	Best Actress in a Leading Role in Musical	Christine Ebersole	Nominated
2017	Tony Awards	Best Actress in a Leading Role in Musical	Patti LuPone	Nominated
2017	Tony Awards	Best Scenic Design of a Musical	David Korins	Nominated
2017	Tony Awards	Best Costume Design of a Musical	Catherine Zuber	Nominated
2017	Drama Desk Awards	Outstanding Actress in a Musical	Christine Ebersole	Nominated
2017	Drama Desk Awards	Outstanding Actress in a Musical	Patti LuPone	Nominated
2017	Drama Desk Awards	Outstanding Lyrics	Michael Korie	Nominated
2017	Drama Desk Awards	Outstanding Orchestrations	Bruce Coughlin	Nominated
2017	Drama Desk Awards	Outstanding Costume Design	Catherine Zuber	Won
2017	Drama Desk Awards	Outstanding Sound Design	Brian Ronan	Nominated
2017	Drama Desk Awards	Outstanding Wig and Hair Design	David Brian Brown	Won
2017	Drama League Award	Outstanding Production of a Broadway or Off-Broadway Musical		Nominated
2017	Outer Critics Circle Award	Outstanding Actress in a Musical	Christine Ebersole	Nominated
2017	Outer Critics Circle Award	Outstanding Actress in a Musical	Patti LuPone	Nominated
2017	Outer Critics Circle Award	Outstanding Costume Design	Catherine Zuber	Won
2017	Outer Critics Circle Award	Outstanding Lighting Design	Kenneth Posner	Nominated

== Subsequent productions ==
In April 2019 War Paint made its regional theatre debut with nine performances produced by Community Theatre of Little Rock. A production by the Kalamazoo Civic Players is scheduled for May 3–19, 2019.
