= Gabriella Slade =

British costume designer

Gabriella Slade is a British costume designer, best known making for her work in musicals such as Six, The Cher Show and Starlight Express. For her work in the musical Six, she has received the Tony Award for Best Costume Design in a Musical and the Drama Desk Award for Outstanding Costume Design of a Musical in 2022, as well as a nomination for the Olivier Award for Best Costume Design in 2019. She also won the Olivier Award for Best Costume Design for Starlight Express in 2025.

== Early life ==
Slade was born in Basingstoke, England and trained at the Royal Welsh College of Music and Drama, graduating with a First class degree in Theatre Design.

== Career ==
Slade was the costume designer for the UK production of In the Heights in 2014. The show opened at the Southwark Playhouse to then transfer to the Kings Cross Theatre. In 2015 she was costume designer for the Edinburgh premiere production of Love Birds.

=== Six ===
In 2017 Slade collaborated with Toby Marlow and Lucy Moss on the show Six, when it was first launched at the Edinburgh Fringe Festival. She has been part of the show since, receiving several nominations and awards for her work, both in the UK and US.

The costumes for the musical are meant to be a mix between pop and Tudor, with each queen being inspired by a pop artist: Catherine of Aragon by Beyoncé, Anne Boleyn by Miley Cyrus, Jane Seymour by a mix of Adele and Sia, Anne of Cleves by a mix of Nicki Minaj and Rihanna, Catherine Howard by Ariana Grande and Catherine Parr by Alicia Keys. Each queen is also represented by a specific color, with, for example, Anne Boleyn being green, as a reference to the "green sleeves" she is often associated with.

Slade also designed the costumes for the UK, US and Australian Tours of the show.

She designed the costumes for the Spice World Arena tour in 2019.

Her costume for Catherine of Aragon is now in the Victoria and Albert Museum’s collection of Theatre and Performance, and could be seen as part of the Re:Imagining Musicals display until November 2023.

=== Later work ===
In 2021 Slade become the costume designer for the musical Bedknobs and Broomsticks which had a full UK tour run. In the same year she was nominated for a WhatsOnStage Award and Broadway World Award for Best Costume Design for her work on the show.

Slade was part of the creative team for the 2023 UK transfer of The Cher Show, with Arlene Phillips as director and Oti Mabuse as choreographer. In creating the costumes for the show Slade said to have been inspired by Bob Mackie's iconic looks for Cher, as well as some modern pop icons, like Lady Gaga and J-Lo The show presents Cher in three different eras and the role is divided between three actresses: in the UK version Millie O’Connell played Babe, Danielle Steers played Lady and Debbie Kurup played Star.

Slade won the WhatsOnStage Award for Best Costume Design in 2023, for her work on the show.

In 2025 Slade created the costumes for Andrew Lloyd Webber's Starlight Express, running at the Troubadour Theatre in Wembley, leading her to winning the 2025 Olivier Award for Best Costume Design.

== Honors and awards ==
=== UK Awards ===
Year	Nominated work	Award	Category	Result
2015	In the Heights	Offie	Best Costume Design	Nominated
2019	Six	Laurence Olivier Award	Best Costume Design	Nominated
2019	Six	Offie	Best Costume Design	Won
2019	Six	WhatsOnStage Awards	Best Costume Design	Nominated
2021	Bedknobs and Broomsticks	WhatsOnStage Awards	Best Costume Design	Nominated
2021	Bedknobs and Broomsticks	Broadway World Award	Best Costume Design	Nominated
2023	The Cher Show	WhatsOnStage Awards	Best Costume Design	Won
2025	Starlight Express	Laurence Olivier Award	Best Costume Design	Won
2026	Paddington: The Musical	WhatsOnStage Awards	Best Costume Design	Won
2026	Paddington: The Musical	Laurence Olivier Award	Best Costume Design	Won

=== US Awards ===
Year	Nominated work	Award	Category	Result
2022	Six	Tony Awards	Best Costume Design in a Musical	Won
2022	Six	Drama Desk Awards	Outstanding Costume Design of a Musical	Won
2022	Six	Outer Critics Circle Award	Outstanding Costume Design	Won
