= Linda Cho =

Costume designer

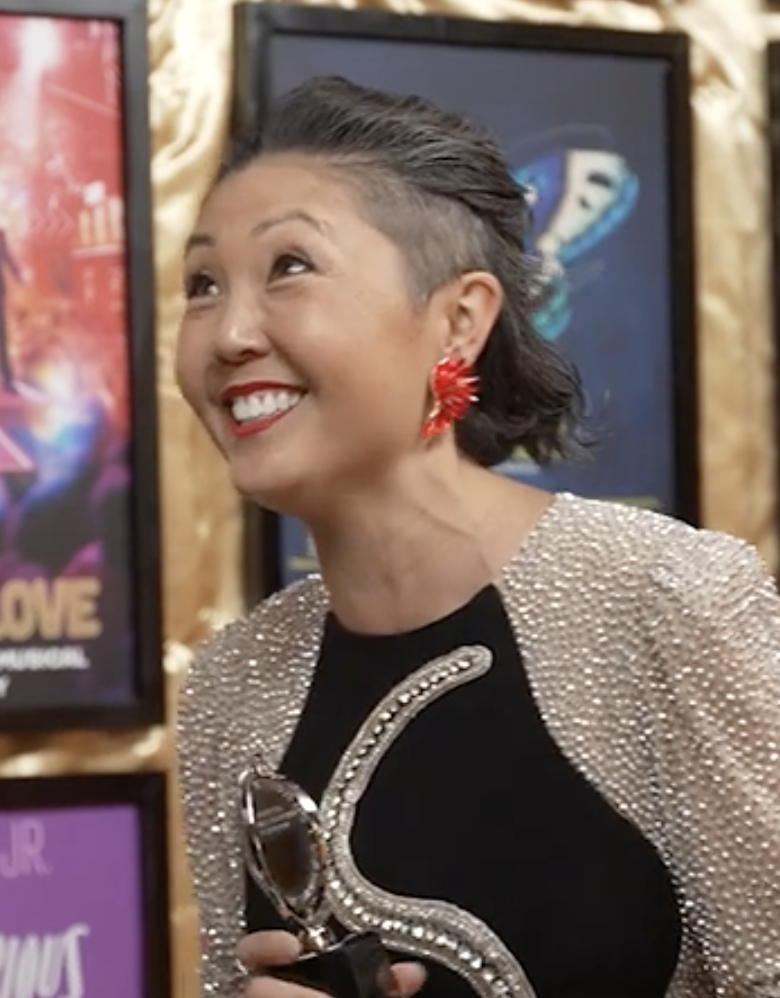
- Born: Seoul, South Korea
- Education: McGill University (BA); Yale University (MFA)
- Occupation: Costume designer
- Website: Official website

Linda Cho is a Korean-born costume designer raised in Canada and based in the U.S. She has designed costumes for more than 15 Broadway productions, won two Tony Awards and been nominated for three more. She has also designed for opera and ballet companies, including the Metropolitan Opera and American Ballet Theatre, among others.

== Early life and education ==
Born to an oil painter mother, Min Soon Cho, in Seoul and raised in Toronto, Cho attended Paris American Academy for fashion (1991), received a BA from McGill University in Montreal (1995) and an MFA in design from Yale School of Drama (1998).

== Career ==
By 2019, Cho had designed costumes for more than 200 productions. Her designs have been seen in productions on Broadway, off-Broadway, in U.S. regional theatres, Canada, Britain (including Royal Shakespeare Company) and Asia. In addition to plays and musicals, she has designed for opera companies, including the Metropolitan Opera and dance companies, including American Ballet Theatre.

Cho says that her pre-design research of each work's era is her favorite part of the design process. However, she has taken liberties regarding historical accuracy. In her work for Anastasia, for example, the Parisian costumes "[have] a heightened flair; it’s not true 1920s," as she instead wanted to invoke "a playful, pushed, bright feeling, like a young lady’s fantasy of what Paris is, a romanticized view, to have an opposite effect of the Russian revolution costumes". In other cases, her costumes have strayed from historical accuracy to allow dancers to perform "non-period movement", to appeal to the modern gaze, or to allow for quick changes backstage. In creating her designs, she uses a pencil and small watercolor set, allowing her to work while on a plane. She says that her design sketches are done in about an hour. When picking fabrics for her designs, she prefers to choose all the fabric for the production at one time, rather than to "design one gown in isolation".

== Personal life ==
Cho has two children. She created her own wedding dress, as well as the dresses she has worn to the Tony Awards ceremonies.

== Costume design credits ==
=== Broadway ===
- A Gentleman's Guide to Love and Murder (2013)
- The Velocity of Autumn (2014)
- Anastasia (2017)
- The Lifespan of a Fact (2018)
- The Great Society (2019)
- Grand Horizons (2020)
- POTUS: Or, Behind Every Great Dumbass Are Seven Women Trying to Keep Him Alive (2022)
- Take Me Out (2022)
- Summer, 1976 (2023)
- Harmony (2023)
- Doubt: A Parable (2024)
- The Great Gatsby (2024)
- Pirates! The Penzance Musical (2025)
- Art (2025)
- Ragtime (2025)
- Schmigadoon! (2026)

=== Off-Broadway ===
- The Chinese Lady
- The Half-God of Rainfall

== Awards and nominations ==
Year	Awards	Category	Work	Result
2014	Irene Sharaff Awards	Young Master Award		Won
2014	Outer Critics Circle Awards	Outstanding Costume Design	A Gentleman's Guide to Love and Murder	Nominated
2014	Tony Awards	Best Costume Design in a Musical	A Gentleman's Guide to Love and Murder	Won
2017	Drama Desk Awards	Outstanding Costume Design of a Musical	Anastasia	Nominated
2017	Outer Critics Circle Awards	Outstanding Costume Design	Anastasia	Nominated
2017	Tony Awards	Best Costume Design of a Musical	Anastasia	Nominated
2022	Drama Desk Awards	Outstanding Costume Design for a Play	The Chinese Lady	Nominated
2024	Lucille Lortel Awards	Outstanding Costume Design	The Half-God of Rainfall	Nominated
2024	Outer Critics Circle Awards	Outstanding Costume Design	The Great Gatsby	Won
2024	Tony Awards	Best Costume Design of a Musical	The Great Gatsby	Won
2026	Tony Awards	Best Costume Design of a Musical	Ragtime	Nominated
2026	Tony Awards	Best Costume Design of a Musical	Schmigadoon!	Nominated
2026	Outer Critics Circle Awards	Outstanding Costume Design	Schmigadoon!	Won
