= Emilio Sosa =

American costume designer

- Born: February 23, 1967 (age 59); Santo Domingo, Dominican Republic
- Education: Pratt Institute (BFA)

Emilio Sosa (born February 23, 1967) is a costume designer for Broadway and is a former chair of the American Theatre Wing Board of Trustees in New York City. He has been nominated for 5 Tony Awards, won a Drama Desk Award and a Lucille Lortel Award as a costume designer, and is best-known for his work on Topdog/Underdog, Porgy and Bess, and By the Way, Meet Vera Stark.

== Early life ==
Emilio Sosa was born in Santo Domingo, Dominican Republic and grew up in South Bronx, New York City. His interest in fashion and design started at the age of 14. While attending school in Harlem, he took afternoon art and design classes at Manhattan's Upper East Side, and free classes Saturdays at Parsons School of Design in Greenwich Village. He then attended Art and Design High School and Pratt Institute for his bachelor's in fashion design.

== Career ==
=== Early career ===
While attending Pratt Institute, Emilio worked a part-time job at Grace Costumes as a shopper and eventually became its creative director in 2006. His first design job out of college was as an assistant costume master for the Alvin Ailey Dance Company, touring domestically and internationally.

He styled music videos for Hip Hop artists including Salt-N-Pepa, MC Lyte, and Kid Play. He later became an in-house stylist for director Spike Lee as an assistant costume designer on his films Bamboozled and Red Hook Summer.

=== Broadway and national ===
Discovered by director George C. Wolfe, Emilio designed his first Broadway show, Topdog/Underdog. He continued to work on shows designed by Ann Hould-Ward, Geoffery Holder, Desmond Heely, Toni Leslie James, and Paul Tazewell. As well as going on tour as a designer for Celine Dion, The Alvin Ailey Dance Company, and the Lincoln Center with Wynton Marsalis.

In 2010, Emilio Sosa then went onto Season 7 of Project Runway, winning five challenges and being runner-up in the finale episode. In 2012, he was runner-up for Project Runway Allstars. He then went on to co-create the fashion line Esosa Designs with his brothers. Celebrities seen wearing Esosa Designs include Wendy Williams, Taraji P. Henson, and Uzo Aduba.

== Honors and recognition ==
Emilio was the first designer of color to design the Radio City Music Hall Spring Spectacular and a new number in the 2018 Christmas show, starring The Rockettes.

In 2005, he received the Helen Hayes Award for Outstanding Costume Design, Resident Production for the musical, Señor Discretion Himself. He was called the 2003 Design Virtuoso in the American Theatre Magazine. His costume design work on By the Way, Meet Vera Stark received the Henry Hewes Award in 2011 and Lucille Lortel Award. He was also awarded the LA Ovation Award for his work on the musical Twist, the 2006 Irene Sharaff Young Master Award, and the 2015 NAACP Theatre Awards for the musical Porgy and Bess.

He has been nominated for a Tony Award in 2012 for Best Costume Design in a Musical for Porgy and Bess, Best Costume Design in a Play for Trouble in Mind, and the 2004 NAACP Theatre Award for Best Costume Design for Topdog/Underdog. Sosa is chair of the Board of Trustees of the American Theatre Wing As of 2021.

== Productions worked on ==
=== Plays ===
Sources:

- Topdog/Underdog
- Lady Day at Emerson's Bar and Grill
- By the Way, Meet Vera Stark
- Venus
- Crowns
- Trust
- Romeo and Juliet
- The Misanthrope
- Sex with Strangers
- White Card
- Ma Rainey's Black Bottom
- Ruined
- Twist
- Fences
- Skeleton Crew
- Frost/Nixon
- Artney Jackson
- Seize the King
- Sweat
- Eve's Song
- Man in the Ring
- The Light
- Do You Feel Anger?
- Much Ado About Nothing
- The Way She Spoke
- Make Believe
- The Hot Wing King
- 72 Miles To Go
- Trouble in Mind (Tony Award Nomination)

=== Musicals ===
- Sweeney Todd
- ON YOUR FEET!
- ExtraOrdinary
- MOTOWN: The Musical
- Porgy and Bess (Tony Award Nomination)
- Me and My Girl
- Invisible Thread
- The Capeman
- Señor Discretion Himself
- Miss You Like Hell
- The Scottsboro Boys
- Shout Sister Shout!

=== Other performances and film ===
- The Rockettes - 2018 Christmas Show
- Red Hook Summer
- Radio City New York Spectacular
- New York Knicks City Dancers
- Descendants: The Rise of Red

=== Theatres worked for ===
- Mark Taper Forum Theatre
- Long Wharf Theatre
- The American Repertory Theatre Production
- Ahmanson Theatre
- Geffen Playhouse
- Arena Stage
- Goodman Theatre
- McCarter Theater
- Roundabout Theatre Company

=== Appearances ===
- Working in the Theatre - Costumes - 2015
- Behind the Scenes Show: The Tony Awards - 2016
- Live from the Red Carpet: The 2016 Tony Awards
- Live from the Red Carpet: The 2015 Tony Awards
- Project Runway All Stars - 2012-2014
- Project Runway Season 7 - 2010

== Awards and nominations ==
Year	Award	Category	Work	Result	Ref.
2006	Irene Sharaff Awards	Young Master Award		Won	
2012	Tony Award	Best Costume Design of a Musical	Porgy and Bess	Nominated	
2012	Drama Desk Award	Outstanding Costume Design	By the Way, Meet Vera Stark	Nominated	
2012	Lucille Lortel Award	Outstanding Costume Design	By the Way, Meet Vera Stark	Won	
2016	Outer Critics Circle Award	Outstanding Costume Design	On Your Feet!	Nominated	
2018	Drama Desk Award	Outstanding Costume Design of a Play	Venus	Nominated	
2022	Tony Award	Best Costume Design of a Play	Trouble in Mind	Nominated	
2022	Outer Critics Circle Award	Outstanding Costume Design	Trouble in Mind	Nominated	
2023	Tony Award	Best Costume Design of a Play	Ain't No Mo'	Nominated	
2023	Drama Desk Award	Outstanding Costume Design of a Play	Ain't No Mo'	Won	
2024	Tony Award	Best Costume Design of a Play	Purlie Victorious	Nominated	
2026	Tony Award	Best Costume Design of a Play	The Balusters	Nominated	
2026	Drama Desk Award	Outstanding Costume Design of a Play	The Balusters	Nominated	
2026	Outer Critics Circle Award	Outstanding Costume Design	Masquerade	Nominated	
