= Schmigadoon! (musical) =

Stage musical by Cinco Paul

- Broadway promotional poster
- Music: Cinco Paul
- Lyrics: Cinco Paul
- Book: Cinco Paul
- Basis: Schmigadoon! by Cinco Paul and Ken Daurio
- Productions: 2025 Washington, D.C. 2026 Broadway
- Awards: Tony Award for Best Musical; Tony Award for Best Book of a Musical; Tony Award for Best Original Score

Schmigadoon! is a musical with book, music, and lyrics by Cinco Paul. It is an adaptation of the first season of the 2021 musical television series of the same name co-created by Paul and Ken Daurio. It includes songs both from the TV series, as well as original songs written by Paul for the stage. The plot follows two New York City doctors, Melissa Gimble and Josh Skinner, struggling with their romantic relationship, who find themselves trapped in the titular magical town similar to the setting of a Golden Age musical, populated by colorful people who frequently break into song.

The musical premiered at the Eisenhower Theater at the Kennedy Center in Washington, D.C., directed and choreographed by Christopher Gattelli, and opened on Broadway in April 2026. The production won four Tony Awards, including Best Musical.

== Background ==
The original television series was created by Cinco Paul and Ken Daurio, with all songs written by Paul. It premiered on July 16, 2021, starring an ensemble cast led by Cecily Strong and Keegan-Michael Key as Melissa and Josh. Blending satire and homage, Schmigadoon! alluded to various Golden Age musicals of the 1940s and '50s in a pastiche of their plots and song styles. The title, specifically, is a send up of the 1947 musical Brigadoon, which similarly follows travelers getting trapped inside a magical town. Choreography was by Christopher Gattelli. The series was renewed for a second season focusing on the darker, edgier themes of 1960s and '70s musicals. It was not renewed again, though Paul has since said that he has written a complete third season spoofing 80s and 90s musicals.

The musical adapts the first season of the TV series. Differences include removing the opening flashbacks of each episode, cutting scenes involving characters such as Doc Lopez's parents, and the addition and modification of some songs. Paul revealed that the musical not only compresses the six episodes of season one into a single story and simplifies the setting, but it restores some items that were cut from TV production; he also hopes to adapt all three seasons for the stage.

A workshop presentation of the musical in June 2024 featured Sara Chase as Melissa Gimble, Alex Brightman as Josh Skinner, Joy Woods as Emma Tate, Kevin Del Aguila as Reverend Layton and the Leprechaun, Claybourne Elder as Danny Bailey, Beth Leavel as Mildred Layton, Mauricio Martinez as Doc Lopez, Ruthie Ann Miles as Florence Menlove and Countess von Blerkom, Brad Oscar as Mayor Menlove, and Stephanie Styles as Betsy McDonough.

== Productions ==
=== Washington, D.C. (2025) ===
The musical premiered at the Eisenhower Theater at the Kennedy Center in Washington, D.C., as part of the Broadway Center Stage series from January 31 until February 9, 2025. The production was directed and choreographed by Gattelli. Reprising their workshop roles were Brightman as Josh, Chase as Melissa, Del Aguila as Reverend Layton and Oscar as Mayor Menlove. Ann Harada reprised her role from the original series as Florence Menlove. New cast members included McKenzie Kurtz as Betsy, Isabelle McCalla as Emma, Javier Muñoz as Doc Lopez, Angel Reda as the Countess, Emily Skinner as Mildred, Ryan Vasquez as Danny, and Ayaan Diop as Carson. The production featured orchestrations by Doug Besterman (who served as an executive music producer and orchestrator for the television series) and designs by Scott Pask (scenery), Linda Cho (costumes), Jen Schriever (lighting), Haley Parcher (sound) and Tom Watson (hair and makeup).

=== Broadway (2026) ===
The production opened on Broadway on April 20, 2026, having begun previews on April 4, at the Nederlander Theatre. It is again directed and choreographed by Gatelli. Brightman, Chase, Oscar, Harada, McCalla, Kurtz, and Diop all reprise their Washington roles, with new cast members including Ana Gasteyer as Mildred, Maulik Pancholy as Reverend Layton and the Leprechaun, Ivan Hernandez as Doc, and Max Clayton (a Washington ensemble member) as Danny. Pask, Cho, and Watson returned to design scenery, costumes, and hair and makeup, respectively, with Donald Holder designing lighting and Walter Trarbach designing sound. Producers include Lorne Michaels, who also served as a producer on the original series. The production was nominated for twelve Tony Awards, tied for the most in the season, winning four: best musical, book, score and orchestrations. A cast recording was released digitally on August 21, 2026. The production is expected to run into at least April 2027. Notable members of the production team are Lorne Michaels, James L. Nederlander, Jeffrey Finn and John Gore Organization.

=== North American tour (planned) ===
A North American tour is planned to begin in late 2027 beginning at the Hippodrome Theatre at the France-Merrick Performing Arts Center in Baltimore, Maryland.

== Plot ==
=== Act 1 ===
New Yorkers Josh Skinner, an orthopedic surgeon, and Melissa Gimble, an OBGYN begin a relationship which, over the course of two years, grows strained. Melissa signs them up for a couples' retreat in the Catskills. Lost in the woods in the rain, they argue and stumble upon a bridge that leads to the idyllic town of Schmigadoon. Mayor Menlove and the townsfolk welcome them ("Schmigadoon!"). Josh dislikes the "performative" town, but Melissa insists they stay. Mildred Layton, the Reverend's puritanical wife, disapproves of the unmarried city folk but leads them to the Inn.

Melissa meets the town "rapscallion" Danny Bailey. He muses about sharing a life and children with her but declares he will not settle down ("You Can't Tame Me"). At breakfast the flirtatious waitress, Betsy, suggests the town's favorite dish ("Corn Puddin'"). Josh and Melissa are unable to leave town; a leprechaun explains that until they find true love, they are stuck in Schmigadoon ("Leprechaun Song"). Realizing they are trapped in a musical, Josh suggests that they seek true love with others. They argue and break up ("Lovers' Spat"). Betsy tells Josh about the picnic basket auction – the men bid on baskets made by the women to win a date with them and raise money for the library. Mayor Menlove consoles Melissa, who realizes he is gay ("Somewhere Love Is Waiting for You").

At the auction, Melissa gets drunk and, seeing Josh win Betsy's basket, auctions herself off; she is won by Danny ("The Picnic Basket Auction"). Melissa, attracted to Danny, gets her own song and dance; she spends the night with him ("Enjoy the Ride"). Josh and Betsy picnic and, suspecting she is underage, he discourages her romantic behavior ("I'm Not That Kinda Gal"). She kisses him as her father, Farmer McDonough, arrives to demand a shotgun wedding. Danny awakens in love with Melissa ("You Done Tamed Me"), but she tells him he was a rebound. Believing Melissa pregnant, he vows to get money to support her and their child, even if it means stealing. She learns of Josh's engagement to Betsy ("I'm Engaged"). She looks for lodging, as Mildred has had them banned from the Inn. Josh invites Betsy to walk across the bridge hoping they have found true love. This fails, and he calls off the engagement. Josh tries to cross the bridge with every girl in town, but none is his true love.

The Mayor's wife, Florence, tells Melissa that Doc Lopez, the town doctor, needs a new nurse; the position comes with room and board. Florence wonders why her husband's actions are so "queer" ("What's the Matter with Men?"). Melissa recoils at Josh's operation at the bridge ("Cross That Bridge"). She angrily applies for the nurse position, finding Doc Lopez attractive, while Josh realizes that he did not try to cross with schoolmistress, Emma Tate ("Act I Finale").

=== Act 2 ===
Josh, now Emma's handyman, gives up quickly on fixing a stuck door. Emma and her students school him on the importance of commitment ("With All of Your Heart"). Melissa, now Doc's nurse, is appalled when he turns away an unwed expectant couple, Nancy and Freddy. She explains childbirth to them ("Baby Talk"). Mayor Menlove and the Reverend converse intimately at the town bake sale ("I Thought I Was the Only One"). Emma forces Farmer McDonough to let Betsy make her own decisions; Josh feels that Emma may be his true love, but, annoyed at another song cue, he frightens her off. Josh asks Melissa for advice, as she knows about musicals. She tells him that, as in The Music Man, he could get a trumpet for Carson, Emma's younger brother, but warns Josh he must sing to express his feelings to Emma. Josh assists Melissa in delivering Nancy's baby. Doc Lopez is outraged that Melissa defied him to deliver the baby. Danny bursts in to rob Doc to provide for the baby he thinks he'll share with Melissa. Falling on his own knife, Danny dies.

At Danny's funeral ("When the Night is Darkest"), Reverend Layton preaches living as your true self, prompting Mayor Menlove to come out as gay. Mildred vows to restore the town to its old ways. Unable to find a trumpet, Josh surprises Carson with a kazoo and inspires him to be himself. Josh sings a word, and Emma feels love. Doc Lopez apologizes to Melissa for being close-minded. He says he is falling in love; elsewhere, Emma tells Josh the same ("Suddenly").

Mildred riles up the townsfolk against Josh and Melissa and runs for mayor of Schmigadoon ("Tribulation"). Emma reveals that she is actually Carson's mother, not his sister. Josh and Carson accept her for who she is, and the Tates go to cross the bridge with Josh. Doc's fiancée, Countess Gabrielle von Blerkom, arrives unexpectedly to threaten Melissa with a pistol for stealing her man. Doc ends his engagement with the countess and proposes to Melissa, but she realizes she is still in love with Josh ("Melissa's Epiphany") and goes to find him. Meanwhile, Josh has memories of his first meeting Melissa ("Dream Ballet"), and Emma sees that he still loves her. She tells him to follow his true feelings.

The election is underway ("Election Day"), and the town prepares to vote for Mildred. Melissa apologizes for being a perfectionist in their relationship and tells Josh that he is her true love. He finally sings to her, expressing the same ("You Make Me Wanna Sing"). Mildred says they have caused chaos in Schmigadoon, but Emma and others feel they have changed the town for the better. Florence supports the mayor, Emma reveals that Carson is her son, the Reverend discloses that he loves the mayor, and the townsfolk reveal their secrets. Mildred insults them all, and the town unanimously re-elects Menlove. Mildred melts down, but Melissa and Josh advise her to embrace change. Mildred reconnects with Nancy, who is revealed to be her daughter. Everyone reflects on how they have changed; Josh and Melissa finally cross the bridge out of Schmigadoon ("How We Change/Finale").

== Casts ==
| Character | Washington, D.C. | Broadway |
| Character | 2025 | 2026 |
|---|---|---|
| Melissa Gimble | Sara Chase | Sara Chase |
| Josh Skinner | Alex Brightman | Alex Brightman |
| Mildred Layton | Emily Skinner | Ana Gasteyer |
| Reverend Layton / Leprechaun | Kevin Del Aguila | Maulik Pancholy |
| Mayor Menlove | Brad Oscar | Brad Oscar |
| Florence Menlove | Ann Harada | Ann Harada |
| Emma Tate | Isabelle McCalla | Isabelle McCalla |
| Danny Bailey | Ryan Vasquez | Max Clayton |
| Betsy McDonough | McKenzie Kurtz | McKenzie Kurtz |
| Doc Lopez | Javier Muñoz | Ivan Hernandez |
| Carson Tate | Ayaan Diop | Ayaan Diop |

=== Notable cast replacements ===
==== Broadway (2026) ====
- Mildred Layton: Jennifer Simard
- Doc Lopez: Juan Pablo Di Pace

== Musical numbers ==
Act I

- "Schmigadoon!" – Ensemble, Mayor Menlove, and Mildred Layton
- "You Can't Tame Me" – Danny
- "Corn Puddin' " – Melissa, Betsy and Ensemble
- "The Leprechaun Song" – Leprechaun
- "Lovers' Spat" – Company and Mildred
- "Somewhere Love Is Waiting for You" – Mayor Menlove
- "The Picnic Basket Auction" – Company†
- "Enjoy the Ride" – Melissa, Danny and Betsy
- "Not That Kinda Gal" – Betsy and Josh‡
- "You Done Tamed Me" – Danny
- "I'm Engaged" – Betsy and Women†
- "What's the Matter with Men?" – Mrs. Menlove and Melissa‡
- "Cross That Bridge" – Company
- "Act I Finale" – Company†

Act II

- "With All of Your Heart" – Emma and Schoolchildren
- "Baby Talk" – Melissa, Nancy, and Freddy‡
- "I Thought I Was the Only One" – Mayor Menlove and Reverend Layton†
- "You Done Killed Me" – Danny†
- "When the Night Is Darkest" – Company†
- "Suddenly" – Doc Lopez and Emma
- "Tribulation" – Mildred and Company
- "Melissa's Epiphany" – Melissa†
- "NYC Dream Ballet" – Orchestra
- "Election Day" – Company†
- "You Make Me Wanna Sing" – Josh and Melissa
- "How We Change/Finale" – Company

Key

- † New song not featured in the original series.
- ‡ Replaced songs from the original series including "Enjoy the Ride (Part II)", "He's a Queer One, That Man o' Mine", and "Va-Gi-Na"

== Reception ==
Reviewing the Kennedy Center production, Rhoda Feng of Vulture wrote: "Gattelli moves things along at a brisk pace." She praised the book, music, and lyrics as "a rhapsodic remix of – and tribute to – Broadway classics" and enjoyed the new duet "I Thought I Was the Only One". She thought, however, that the show's "handling of race strikes a discordant note" by eliminating some of the sensitive allusions to race seen in the TV series, noting: "Casting a white actor as Josh diminishes the opportunities for the show to probe these problems. Lines from the TV series about 'color-blind casting' and 'miscegenation' have vanished". She found Josh's character diminished and simplified by providing less of his backstory. Nevertheless, she praised both Brightman and Chase, as well as the "bell-voiced" McCalla, Harada, set and lighting, concluding that "Schmigadoon! offers a heady dose of Golden Age escapism". Maybe too heady at times." Some other reviewers had mixed reactions: Naveen Kumar of The Washington Post missed "the specifics of the relationship between Josh and Melissa" but found the score infectious, while some gave the musical strong praise ("Schmigadoon is a gloriously delightful night of escape at the theatre. ... What it lacks in technical perfection, it makes up for in witty one-liners and all-too-familiar songs. It executes musical parody as never seen before on stage". – Aidan O'Connor, of MD Theatre Guide).

The Broadway production received mostly positive reviews. Review aggregator Did They Like It? listed 13 positive reviews, 4 mixed reviews, and one negative review. Elisabeth Vincentelli of The New York Times gave it a "Critic's Pick", calling it a "blast" and said, "You don’t need to have memorized the Rodgers and Hammerstein songbook to have a good time, but knowledge of some musical-theater fundamentals adds an extra layer – or 10 – to the enjoyment." By contrast, Johnny Oleksinski of The New York Post gave the show two stars out of four, calling it a "tired parody" and saying, "Melissa and Josh are ready to leave Schmigadoon. And so are we."

== Awards and nominations ==
=== Broadway production ===
| Year | Award | Category | Work | Result | Ref. |
|---|---|---|---|---|---|
| 2026 | Drama League Awards | Outstanding Production of a Musical | | Nominated | |
| 2026 | Drama League Awards | Distinguished Performance | Sara Chase | Nominated | |
| 2026 | Outer Critics Circle Award | Outstanding New Broadway Musical | | Won | |
| 2026 | Outer Critics Circle Award | Outstanding Book of a Musical | Cinco Paul | Won | |
| 2026 | Outer Critics Circle Award | Outstanding Choreography | Christopher Gattelli | Won | |
| 2026 | Outer Critics Circle Award | Outstanding Orchestrations | Doug Besterman and Mike Morris | Won | |
| 2026 | Outer Critics Circle Award | Outstanding Lead Performer in a Broadway Musical | Sara Chase | Nominated | |
| 2026 | Outer Critics Circle Award | Outstanding Featured Performer in a Broadway Musical | Max Clayton | Nominated | |
| 2026 | Outer Critics Circle Award | Outstanding Scenic Design | Scott Pask | Nominated | |
| 2026 | Outer Critics Circle Award | Outstanding Costume Design | Linda Cho | Won | |
| 2026 | Drama Desk Awards | Outstanding Musical | | Won | |
| 2026 | Drama Desk Awards | Outstanding Featured Performance in a Musical | Max Clayton | Nominated | |
| 2026 | Drama Desk Awards | Outstanding Featured Performance in a Musical | McKenzie Kurtz | Nominated | |
| 2026 | Drama Desk Awards | Outstanding Choreography | Christopher Gattelli | Won | |
| 2026 | Tony Awards | Best Musical | | Won | |
| 2026 | Tony Awards | Best Book of a Musical | Cinco Paul | Won | |
| 2026 | Tony Awards | Best Original Score | Cinco Paul | Won | |
| 2026 | Tony Awards | Best Performance by a Leading Actress in a Musical | Sara Chase | Nominated | |
| 2026 | Tony Awards | Best Performance by a Featured Actress in a Musical | Ana Gasteyer | Nominated | |
| 2026 | Tony Awards | Best Scenic Design of a Musical | Scott Pask | Nominated | |
| 2026 | Tony Awards | Best Costume Design of a Musical | Linda Cho | Nominated | |
| 2026 | Tony Awards | Best Lighting Design of a Musical | Donald Holder | Nominated | |
| 2026 | Tony Awards | Best Sound Design of a Musical | Walter Trarbach | Nominated | |
| 2026 | Tony Awards | Best Direction of a Musical | Christopher Gattelli | Nominated | |
| 2026 | Tony Awards | Best Choreography | Christopher Gattelli | Nominated | |
| 2026 | Tony Awards | Best Orchestrations | Doug Besterman and Mike Morris | Won | |
| 2026 | Chita Rivera Award | Outstanding Choreography in a Broadway Show | Christopher Gattelli | Won | |
| 2026 | Chita Rivera Award | Outstanding Dancer in a Broadway Show | Isabelle McCalla | Won | |
| 2026 | Chita Rivera Award | Outstanding Dancer in a Broadway Show | Max Clayton | Won | |
| 2026 | Chita Rivera Award | Outstanding Ensemble in a Broadway Show | | Won | |
| 2026 | Dorian Award | Outstanding Broadway Musical | | Won | |
| 2026 | Dorian Award | Outstanding LGBTQ Broadway Production | | Nominated | |
| 2026 | Dorian Award | Outstanding Lead Performance in a Broadway Musical | Sara Chase | Nominated | |
| 2026 | Dorian Award | Outstanding Featured Performance in a Broadway Musical | Max Clayton | Nominated | |
| 2026 | Dorian Award | Outstanding Featured Performance in a Broadway Musical | Ana Gasteyer | Nominated | |
| 2026 | Dorian Award | Outstanding Broadway Ensemble | Company | Nominated | |
| 2026 | Dorian Award | Outstanding Original Score of a Broadway Production | Cinco Paul | Nominated | |
| 2026 | Dorian Award | Outstanding Book of a Broadway Musical | Cinco Paul | Won | |
| 2026 | Dorian Award | Outstanding Design of a Broadway Production | | Nominated | |

== See also ==
- Schm-reduplication, indicating irony or sarcasm
