= Qween Jean =

Activist and costume designer

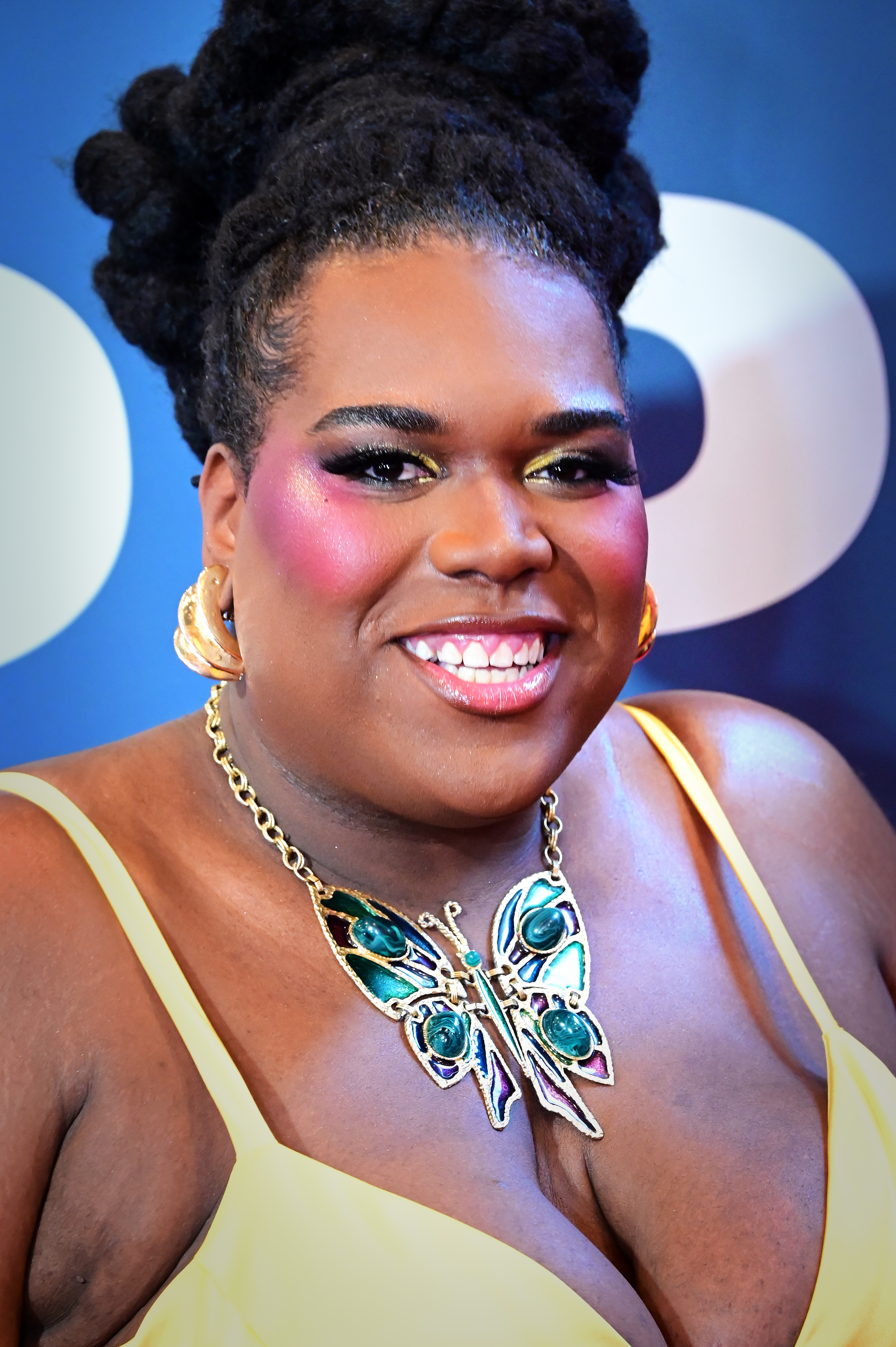
- Jean in 2026
- Born: Haiti
- Education: St. Johns River State College (attended); University of North Carolina, Chapel Hill (BA); New York University (MFA)
- Occupation: Costume designer
- Known for: LGBT activism
- Movement: Black liberation; Trans liberation; Police abolition
- Awards: Obie Award (2023); Tony Award (2026)

Qween Jean is a costume designer and LGBT+ rights activist based in New York City. In 2026, she won a Tony Award for Best Costume Design of a Musical for her costume design work in Cats: The Jellicle Ball, becoming the first openly transgender winner of a Tony Award. She was also nominated for her work on Bess Wohl's Liberation.

== Early life ==
Jean was born in Haiti before moving with her family to Miami, Florida. Growing up, she struggled with gender dysphoria and read queer stories, including books by James Baldwin, for support. She learned how to sew from her grandmother, who was a dressmaker.

=== Education ===
She attended Florida School of the Arts at St. Johns River State College before transferring to University of North Carolina where she obtained a bachelor's degree in Business Communications. In 2016, she graduated from New York University's Tisch School of the Arts with a master's degree in Design and went on to have a career as a costume designer.

== Activism ==
=== Black trans liberation protests ===
In June 2020, following the murders of Black transgender woman Nina Pop, and Black transgender man Tony McDade, and the lack of coverage of the murders in the media, Jean co-founded the Black trans liberation protests in New York City with Joela-Abiona Rivera.

Gay City News states the protests' purpose was to "underscore the importance of trans rights and condemn the ongoing killings of transgender people." The protests took place every Thursday outside the Stonewall Inn, in Washington Square Park, and through the streets of the city. Them wrote, "As the fight for safety and inclusion continues, Jean utilizes marches as a means of building coalitions, dismantling bigotry, and creating spaces for joy and celebration." The protests – and Jean – are the subjects of the photo book Revolution Is Love: A Year of Black Trans Liberation.

Qween Jean is the co-founder of Black Trans Liberation Kitchen, a collective that helps to provide healthy, home-cooked meals to preserve and nourish the vitality of the TGNC community. Ceyenne Doroshow has participated with Qween Jean and the BTLK as a guest chef. Doroshow states that, “Giving young people access to making their own food in the simplest ways is not only sustainable, it’s nutrition. To see a sisterhood and a brotherhood form around food, there’s nothing quite like it.” Black Trans Liberation's mission is to end homelessness within the trans population by equipping transgender people with resources to succeed.

She drew criticism after saying at a pro-Palestinian rally in early 2024 while excoriating Democratic politicians, “We are sick and tired of being told and reminded of the events of October 7.”

=== Events ===
On July 9, 2020, Jean spoke at a protest demanding abolition of the police and decriminalization of sex work.

On January 18, 2021, Jean led a trans liberation protest where the crowd was attacked and beaten by the NYPD. Jean said of the event, "The entire march was attacked and beaten by the NYPD. Literally, where trans women were being attacked by the police, their wigs getting ripped off, being dragged on the concrete. There is a parallel to the 1969 liberation fight."

On June 13, 2021, Jean led the second Brooklyn Liberation March, which focused on the empowerment of transgender youth. The event supported organizations such as, "the Gworls, an organization that raises money to assist Black transgender people with housing; the Black Excellence Collective; Trans Lifeline; and Magic City Acceptance Center, a space for LGBTQ children in Birmingham, Alabama." On June 24, 2021, Jean's conversation with Avram Finkelstein, a founding member of the AIDS art collective Gran Fury, was published in Interview. On August 28, 2021, Jean participated in the March On For Voting Rights in Washington D.C. On September 8, 2021, Jean led a rally in support of Abimbola Adelaja, a former Marine, who was attacked for being gay in a Bushwick bodega.

On June 26, 2022, Jean and other activists interrupted the New York City Pride Parade in honor of Donnell Rochester, an 18-year-old murdered by police in Baltimore. Jean stated at the event, "Pride was a protest. Stonewall is the history and legacy of injustice. We are reclaiming our time today. We are reclaiming queer space today. We are reclaiming trans bodies today."

On August 24, 2022, Jean hosted a rally for Marsha P. Johnson’s 77th birthday in Washington Square Park. The same week, Jean co-hosted the third annual Celebration of Black Trans Women Cookout.

On May 31, 2023, Jean was arrested by the NYPD at a protest of anti-trans laws and violence. Activist Adam Eli shared footage of Jean's arrest and stated, "There is no question that the police targeted Qween and that this was their plan for the night. As soon as Qween was arrested the police presence at least halved."

Gay City News reported that Jean was among the leaders of the 2023 Queer Liberation March in New York, an anti-corporate alternative to the NYC Pride March. That day, she stated:

I believe in Black trans liberation. I believe in Black trans power…When trans people unite, whenever we gather, it has no chance but to be magical, because as we can look around and see, our community has come out today. They not only look glorious, they look so divine. This is how we show up in our full armor.

== Artistry ==
Jean's early costume design work for regional, off-Broadway, and off-off-Broadway theater included Our Dear Dead Drug Lord (2019), One in Two (2020), and Siblings Play (2020).

In 2020, Jean was honored in Black Women on Broadway's Inaugural Awards Ceremony for her costume designs. The same year, she designed costumes for Shakespeare Theatre Company’s The Amen Corner. In 2021, she designed costumes for What to Send Up When It Goes Down at Playwrights Horizons.

In 2021, Jean was named an Artist-in-Residence at Museum of Modern Art PS1 and curated the exhibit Black Trans Liberation: Memoriam and Deliverance. Later that year, a portrait of Jean taken by photographer, Christian Thane, was featured in the Queens Museum exhibit, Live Pridefully: Love and Resilience within Pandemics. In 2022, another portrait, taken by Camila Falquez, was featured in the exhibit, Gods That Walk Among Us, at the Hannah Traore Gallery in NYC. Jean was on the cover of Cero Magazine and featured in Logo for their "30 Changemakers" series.

In 2022, Jean designed the costumes for Theatre for a New Audience's production, Wedding Band: A Love/Hate Story in Black and White, and was nominated for a Drama Desk Award for Outstanding Costume Design of a Play. On June 25, 2022, Jean co-hosted The Big Mix – LGBTQIA+ Pride with Idina Menzel. Jean had a cameo on And Just Like That...

In 2023, she designed the costumes for The New Group's production, The Seagull/Woodstock, NY. Jean was honored at the 2023 Obie Awards for her costume design.; CLAGS José Muñoz Award (2026). That same year, Jean joined Theatre Communications Group's board of directors.

In 2024, Jean designed costumes for the off-Broadway production of Amy Berryman's sci-fi play Walden. Her costume work was featured in the off-Broadway premiere of Cats: The Jellicle Ball at the Perelman Performing Arts Center.

In 2025, Jean designed the costumes for Damon Cardasis's Saturday Church, staged at the New York Theatre Workshop. For her work on Saturday Church, she won the 2026 Lucille Lortel Award for Outstanding Costume Design.

In 2026, Jean's costume design work was nominated for two Tony Awards, for Liberation and Cats: The Jellicle Ball. Her win for her work on Cats: The Jellicle Ball made Jean the first openly transgender person to win a Tony Award. She also won the 2026 Dorian Award for LGBTQ Theater Artist of the Season.

In June 2026, Jean's costume work will be featured in the off-Broadway musical The Potluck at Playwrights Horizons.

== Stage credits ==
Year	Title	Venue	Ref.
2021	The Fever	Off-Broadway, The New Group	
2021	What to Send Up When It Goes Down	Off-Broadway, Playwrights Horizons	
2021	Semblance	Filmed, New York Theatre Workshop	
2022	Black No More	Off-Broadway, Pershing Square Signature Center	
2022	On Sugarland	Off-Broadway, New York Theatre Workshop	
2022	Hound Dog	Off-Broadway, Greenwich House	
2022	Corsicana	Off-Broadway, Playwrights Horizons	
2022	soft	Off-Broadway, MCC Theater	
2022	Wedding Band	Off-Broadway, Theatre for a New Audience	
2023	The Seagull/Woodstock, NY	Off-Broadway, Pershing Square Signature Center	
2024	Jordans	Off-Broadway, The Public Theater	
2024	Cats: The Jellicle Ball	Off-Broadway, Perelman Performing Arts Center	
2025	Angry Alan	Off-Broadway, Second Stage Theatre	
2025	Saturday Church	Off-Broadway, New York Theatre Workshop	
2025	Oh Happy Day!	Off-Broadway, The Public Theater	
2025	Liberation	Broadway, James Earl Jones Theatre	
2026	Cats: The Jellicle Ball	Broadway, Broadhurst Theatre	
2026	The Whoopi Monologues	Off-Broadway, Lincoln Center Theatre	

== Awards and nominations ==
Year	Award	Category	Nominated work	Result
2023	Drama Desk Award	Outstanding Costume Design of a Play	Wedding Band	Nominated
2023	Obie Awards	Special Citation		Won
2023	Obie Award	Special Citation	Corsicana, soft, Wedding Band, Black No More, The Fever, What To Send Up When it Goes Down, Semblance	Honored
2025	Drama Desk Award	Outstanding Costume Design of a Musical	Cats: The Jellicle Ball	Nominated
2025	Outer Critics Circle Award	Outstanding Costume Design	Cats: The Jellicle Ball	Nominated
2026	New York Drama Critics Circle	Special Citation	Cats: The Jellicle Ball	Won
2026	Tony Award	Best Costume Design of a Play	Liberation	Nominated
2026	Tony Award	Best Costume Design of a Musical	Cats: The Jellicle Ball	Won
2026	Drama Desk Awards	Outstanding Costume Design of a Musical	Cats: The Jellicle Ball	Won
2026	Drama Desk Awards	Outstanding Costume Design of a Musical	Saturday Church	Nominated
2026	Drama Desk Awards	Outstanding Costume Design of a Play	Oh Happy Day!	Nominated
2026	Lucille Lortel Awards	Outstanding Costume Design	Saturday Church	Won
2026	Dorian Award	LGBTQ Theater Artist of the Season		Won

== See also ==
- Reclaim Pride Coalition
