= Paloma Young =

American costume designer (born 1979)

- Born: 1979 (age 46–47); California, U.S.
- Education: University of California, Berkeley (BA); University of California, San Diego (MFA)
- Occupation: Costume Designer
- Years active: 2006–present
- Website: Official website

Paloma Young (born 1979) is an American costume designer.

A native of California, Young received a bachelor's degree in social history from University of California, Berkeley in 2000, and continued her education with a Master of Fine Arts in costume design from the graduate theatre program at University of California, San Diego. She has design credits for shows at the La Jolla Playhouse, Old Globe, South Coast Repertory, New York Theatre Workshop, Second Stage Theatre, and Berkeley Repertory Theater amongst others.

She is known for using found materials such as thrift-store garments and reworking them to achieve a "tactile" effect. She has said that costume is one of the most relatable elements of a production and that it helps make a strong connection with audiences.

== Nominations and awards ==
At the 66th Tony Awards, she won a Tony Award for Best Costume Design in a Play for her work on Peter and the Starcatcher.

She was also nominated for a Tony Award for Best Costume Design in a Musical for her work on Natasha, Pierre & The Great Comet of 1812 in 2017.

At the 44th Laurence Olivier Awards, Young was nominated for Best Costume Design for her work in a 2019 musical & Juliet and received another Tony nomination for the Broadway production.
