= Paul Tazewell =

American costume designer (born 1964)

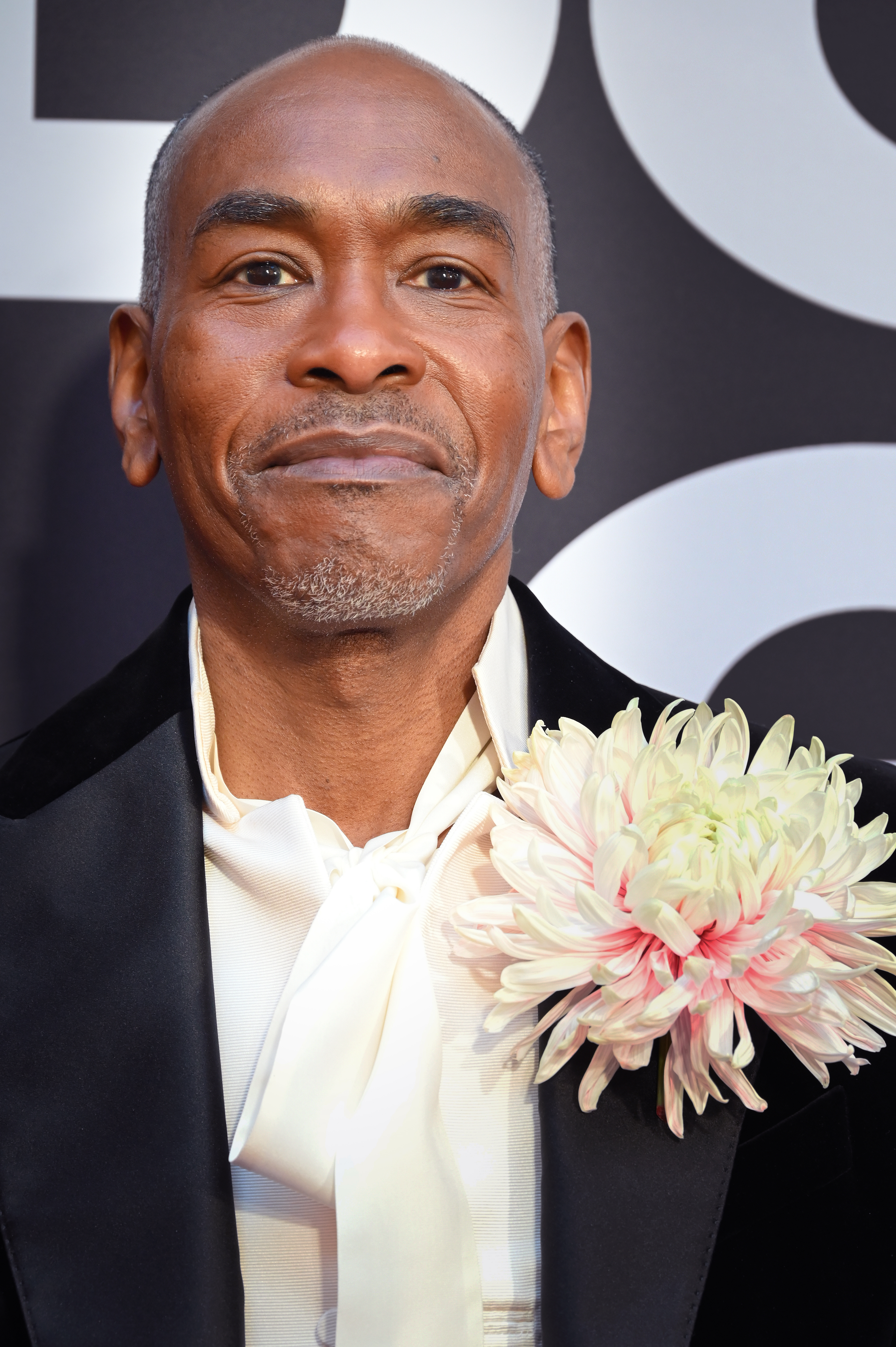
- Tazewell in 2025
- Born: September 15, 1964 (age 62); Akron, Ohio, U.S.
- Education: Pratt Institute (attended); North Carolina School of the Arts (BFA); New York University (MFA)
- Awards: Helen Hayes Awards Resident Design; Lucille Lortel Awards; AUDELCO Award; Princess Grace Award

Paul Tazewell (/ˈtæzwɛl/ TAZ-wel, born September 15, 1964) is an American costume designer for the theatre, dance, film, opera and television industry. After training at New York University Tisch School of the Arts he started his career on Broadway. He has since won an Academy Award, a British Academy Film Award, a Primetime Emmy Award and two Tony Awards.

Tazewell made his Broadway debut as a costume designer with Bring in 'Da Noise, Bring in 'Da Funk in 1996. He went on to receive the Tony Award for Best Costume Design of a Musical for Lin-Manuel Miranda's Hamilton (2016) and Death Becomes Her (2025). His other Tony-nominated works include The Color Purple (2006), In the Heights (2008), Memphis (2010), A Streetcar Named Desire (2012), Ain't Too Proud (2019), MJ (2022), Suffs (2024), and Joe Turner’s Come and Gone (2026).

For his work on Steven Spielberg's West Side Story (2021), Tazewell became the first African American male costume designer to be nominated for the Academy Award for Best Costume Design. He eventually won said award for his work on Wicked (2024) at the 97th Academy Awards. He has also received a Primetime Emmy Award for his work on The Wiz Live! (2016).

Announced in November 2025, Paul Tazewell’s work is currently showcased in an exhibition at Griffin Museum of Science and Industry in Chicago, Illinois. The exhibition features artifacts from throughout his life and career including Wicked, West Side Story, and Hamilton.

== Early life and education ==
Tazewell was born on September 15, 1964 in Akron, Ohio, as one of four sons of Barbara (an artist and French teacher) and Joseph Tazewell Jr. (a research chemist at the Firestone Tire and Rubber Company who sang bass for his church choir). His mother, who enjoyed sewing and had a Singer sewing machine, taught him to sew when he was 9.

Following his graduation from Buchtel High School in 1982, he enrolled at Pratt Institute, then transferred and graduated from the North Carolina School of the Arts and NYU's Tisch School of the Arts. Tazewell was a resident artist and associate professor of costume design at Carnegie Mellon University in Pittsburgh, Pennsylvania (2003–2006).

His brother, Jonathan Tazewell, is also a writer and director.

== Career ==
At age 16, while a student at Buchtel High School in Akron, Tazewell designed and sewed the costumes for a school production of The Wiz (in which he also played The Wiz); his mother made the white suit and cape that he wore in the production.

Tazewell has designed costumes for over a dozen Broadway productions, starting with Bring in 'Da Noise, Bring in 'Da Funk in 1996 (receiving a Tony Award nomination). Over Tazewell's career, he has costumed numerous plays that are predominantly African American and Latino. Other musicals include On the Town (Revival), The Color Purple, and, in 2009, Guys and Dolls (Revival) and Memphis. Recent Broadway work includes Dr Zhivago, Side Show, and A Streetcar Named Desire. Plays on Broadway have included Lombardi, The Miracle Worker (Revival), Magic/Bird and the Tony Award-winning revival of A Raisin in the Sun. His off-Broadway work as a costume designer includes Hamilton, Elaine Stritch at Liberty (2001), Boston Marriage (2002), Ruined, One Flea Spare, Flesh and Blood, and Harlem Song (Apollo Theater).

In regional theatre he has designed costumes for, among many, Alley Theatre (Camp David, 2020), Arena Stage (The Women, 1999, and Polk County, 2002), The Guthrie Theatre, The Goodman Theatre, and La Jolla Playhouse. His work for ballet companies includes the Boston Ballet, Pacific Northwest Ballet, and the Bolshoi Ballet. Opera credits at Glimmerglass Opera, Opera Theater of St. Louis, Houston Grand Opera, Washington National Opera, ENO, and the Metropolitan Opera.

Tazewell served as costume designer on Wicked and Wicked: For Good, the two-part film adaptation of the Broadway musical. His work on Wicked won him the BAFTA and Academy Award for Best Costume Design. Tazewell is the first Black man to win an Oscar for costume design and the second Black costume designer to win overall after Ruth E. Carter.

== Credits ==
=== Film ===
- Harriet, Focus Features (2019)
- West Side Story, 20th Century Studios (2021)
- Wicked, Universal Pictures (2024)
- Wicked: For Good, Universal Pictures (2025)
- Disclosure Day, Universal Pictures (2026)

=== Television ===
- The Wiz Live!, NBC (2015)
- The Immortal Life of Henrietta Lacks, HBO (2017)
- Jesus Christ Superstar Live in Concert, NBC (2018)

=== Theatre ===
- Before It Hits Home (1992)
- Bring in 'Da Noise, Bring in 'Da Funk (1996)
- On the Town (1998)
- Fascinating Rhythm (1999)
- Boston Marriage (2002)
- Elaine Stritch At Liberty (2002)
- Caroline, or Change (2003)
- A Raisin in the Sun (2004)
- The Color Purple (2005)
- In the Heights (2008)
- Guys and Dolls (2009)
- Memphis (2009)
- Fetch Clay, Make Man (2010)
- Lombardi (2010)
- The Miracle Worker (2010)
- Jesus Christ Superstar (2012)
- A Streetcar Named Desire (2012)
- Magic/Bird (2012)
- Side Show (2014)
- Hamilton (2015)
- Doctor Zhivago (2015)
- Summer: The Donna Summer Musical (2018)
- Escape to Margaritaville (2018)
- Ain't Too Proud (2019)
- MJ (2022)
- Mr. Saturday Night (2022)
- Suffs (2024)
- Death Becomes Her (2024)
- Joe Turner's Come and Gone (2026)

== Awards and nominations ==
He is recipient of eleven total Tony Award nominations for Costume Design, four Helen Hayes Awards for Outstanding Costume Design, two Lucille Lortel Awards for Outstanding Costume Design, the Henry Hewes Award, and the Theater Development Fund's Irene Sharaff Award in 1997. He received the Princess Grace Statue Award bestowed by the Princess Grace Foundation to artists of excellence in various disciplines.

Year	Association	Category	Nominated work	Result	Ref.
2022	Academy Awards	Best Costume Design	West Side Story	Nominated	
2025	Academy Awards	Best Costume Design	Wicked	Won	
2025	American Cinematheque's Tribute to the Crafts	Costume Design	Wicked	Won	
2020	Black Reel Awards	Outstanding Costume Design	Harriet	Nominated	
2022	Black Reel Awards	Outstanding Costume Design	West Side Story	Nominated	
2025	Black Reel Awards	Outstanding Costume Design	Wicked	Won	
2026	Black Reel Awards	Outstanding Costume Design	Wicked: For Good	Won	
2025	British Academy Film Awards	Best Costume Design	Wicked	Won	
2026	British Academy Film Awards	Best Costume Design	Wicked: For Good	Nominated	
2021	Chicago Film Critics Association Awards	Best Costume Design	West Side Story	Nominated	
2024	Chicago Film Critics Association Awards	Best Costume Design	Wicked	Nominated	
2025	Chicago Film Critics Association Awards	Best Costume Design	Wicked: For Good	Nominated	
2016	Costume Designers Guild Awards	Excellence in Fantasy Television	The Wiz Live!	Nominated	
2019	Costume Designers Guild Awards	Excellence in Variety, Reality-Competition, Live Television	Jesus Christ Superstar Live in Concert!	Nominated	
2021	Costume Designers Guild Awards	Excellence in Variety, Reality-Competition, Live Television	Hamilton	Won	
2022	Costume Designers Guild Awards	Excellence in Period Film	West Side Story	Nominated	
2025	Costume Designers Guild Awards	Excellence in Sci-Fi/Fantasy Film	Wicked	Won	
2026	Costume Designers Guild Awards	Excellence in Sci-Fi/Fantasy Film	Wicked: For Good	Won	
2022	Critics' Choice Awards	Best Costume Design	West Side Story	Nominated	
2025	Critics' Choice Awards	Best Costume Design	Wicked	Won	
2026	Critics' Choice Awards	Best Costume Design	Wicked: For Good	Nominated	
2015	Drama Desk Awards	Outstanding Costume Design	Hamilton	Nominated	
2024	Drama Desk Awards	Outstanding Costume Design of a Musical	Suffs	Won	
2025	Drama Desk Awards	Outstanding Costume Design of a Musical	Death Becomes Her	Nominated	
2026	Drama Desk Awards	Outstanding Costume Design of a Play	Joe Turner’s Come and Gone	Won	
2015	Laurence Olivier Awards	Best Costume Design	Memphis	Nominated	
2018	Laurence Olivier Awards	Best Costume Design	Hamilton	Nominated	
1998	Lucille Lortel Awards	Outstanding Costume Design	On the Town	Won	
2015	Lucille Lortel Awards	Outstanding Costume Design	Hamilton	Won	
2025	NAACP Image Awards	Outstanding Costume Design	Wicked	Won	
2026	NAACP Image Awards	Outstanding Costume Design	Wicked: For Good	Nominated	
2025	Outer Critics Circle Awards	Outstanding Costume Design	Death Becomes Her	Nominated	
2016	Primetime Emmy Awards	Outstanding Costumes for a Variety, Nonfiction, or Reality Program	The Wiz Live!	Won	
2018	Primetime Emmy Awards	Outstanding Costumes for a Variety, Nonfiction, or Reality Program	Jesus Christ Superstar Live in Concert!	Nominated	
2025	Santa Barbara International Film Festival	Variety Artisans Award	Wicked	Won	
2025	Satellite Awards	Best Costume Design	Wicked	Won	
2026	Satellite Awards	Best Costume Design	Wicked: For Good	Nominated	
2026	Saturn Awards	Best Costume Design	Wicked: For Good	Nominated	
1996	Tony Awards	Best Costume Design	Bring in 'da Noise, Bring in 'da Funk	Nominated	
2006	Tony Awards	Best Costume Design in a Musical	The Color Purple	Nominated	
2008	Tony Awards	Best Costume Design in a Musical	In the Heights	Nominated	
2010	Tony Awards	Best Costume Design in a Musical	Memphis	Nominated	
2012	Tony Awards	Best Costume Design in a Play	A Streetcar Named Desire	Nominated	
2016	Tony Awards	Best Costume Design in a Musical	Hamilton	Won	
2019	Tony Awards	Best Costume Design in a Musical	Ain't Too Proud	Nominated	
2022	Tony Awards	Best Costume Design in a Musical	MJ the Musical	Nominated	
2024	Tony Awards	Best Costume Design in a Musical	Suffs	Nominated	
2025	Tony Awards	Best Costume Design in a Musical	Death Becomes Her	Won	
2026	Tony Awards	Best Costume Design in a Play	Joe Turner's Come and Gone	Nominated	
