= Mike Morris (orchestrator) =

American orchestrator

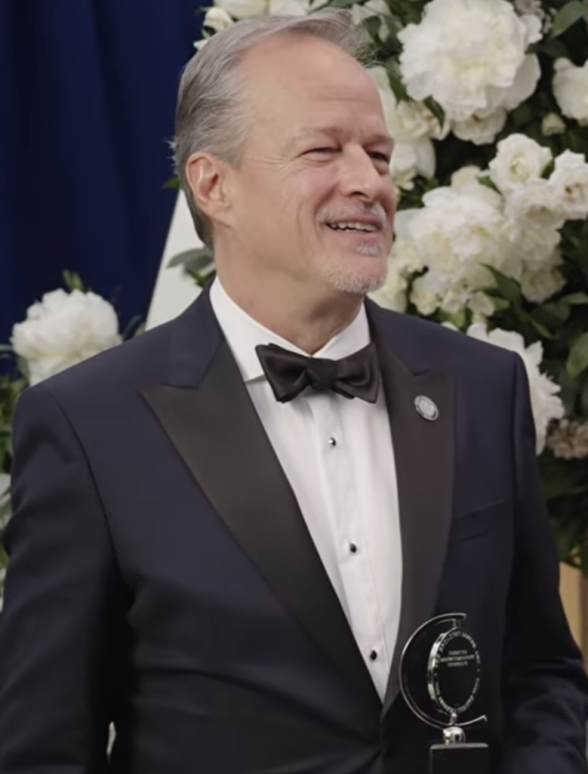
- Morris in 2026
- Education: Berklee College of Music
- Occupation: Orchestrator

Mike Morris is an American orchestrator. He won a Tony Award in the category Best Orchestrations for his work in the musical Schmigadoon along with Doug Besterman.
