= Tony Award for Best Costume Design in a Musical =

American theatre award for Broadway costumes

- Awarded for: Best Costume Design in a Musical
- Location: United States New York City
- Presented by: American Theatre Wing The Broadway League
- Currently held by: Qween Jean for Cats: The Jellicle Ball (2026)
- Website: TonyAwards.com

This is a list of winners and nominations for the Tony Award for Best Costume Design in a Musical for outstanding costume design of a musical. The award was first presented in 1961 after the category of Best Costume Design was divided into Costume Design in a Play and Costume Design in a Musical with each genre receiving its own award. That lasted for only one year, but the Costume Design category was split in two again in 2005 and has remained that way since.

== Winners and nominees ==
indicates the winner

=== 1960s ===
Year	Production	Nominees
1961 (15th)
1961 (15th)	Camelot	Adrian and Tony Duquette
1961 (15th)	Tenderloin	Cecil Beaton
1961 (15th)	Irma la Douce	Rolf Gerard

=== 2000s ===
Year	Production	Nominees
2005 (59th)
2005 (59th)	The Light in the Piazza	Catherine Zuber
2005 (59th)	La Cage aux Folles	William Ivey Long
2005 (59th)	Monty Python's Spamalot	Tim Hatley
2005 (59th)	Pacific Overtures	Junko Kushino
2006 (60th)
2006 (60th)	The Drowsy Chaperone	Gregg Barnes
2006 (60th)	The Color Purple	Paul Tazewell
2006 (60th)	Lestat	Susan Hilferty
2006 (60th)	The Pajama Game	Martin Pakledinaz
2007 (61st)
2007 (61st)	Grey Gardens	William Ivey Long
2007 (61st)	Legally Blonde The Musical	Gregg Barnes
2007 (61st)	Mary Poppins	Bob Crowley
2007 (61st)	Spring Awakening	Susan Hilferty
2008 (62nd)
2008 (62nd)	Rodgers & Hammerstein's South Pacific	Catherine Zuber
2008 (62nd)	Gypsy	Martin Pakledinaz
2008 (62nd)	In the Heights	Paul Tazewell
2008 (62nd)	Sunday in the Park with George	David Farley
2009 (63rd)
2009 (63rd)	Shrek the Musical	Tim Hatley
2009 (63rd)	Billy Elliot the Musical	Nicky Gillibrand
2009 (63rd)	Hair	Michael McDonald
2009 (63rd)	Rock of Ages	Gregory Gale

=== 2010s ===
Year	Production	Nominees
2010 (64th)
2010 (64th)	Fela!	Marina Draghici
2010 (64th)	La Cage aux Folles	Matthew Wright
2010 (64th)	Memphis	Paul Tazewell
2011 (65th)
2011 (65th)	Priscilla, Queen of the Desert	Tim Chappel and Lizzy Gardiner
2011 (65th)	Anything Goes	Martin Pakledinaz
2011 (65th)	The Book of Mormon	Ann Roth
2011 (65th)	How to Succeed in Business Without Really Trying	Catherine Zuber
2012 (66th)
2012 (66th)	Follies	Gregg Barnes
2012 (66th)	Nice Work If You Can Get It	Martin Pakledinaz
2012 (66th)	Porgy and Bess	Emilio Sosa
2012 (66th)	Spider-Man: Turn Off the Dark	Eiko Ishioka
2013 (67th)
2013 (67th)	Rodgers + Hammerstein's Cinderella	William Ivey Long
2013 (67th)	Kinky Boots	Gregg Barnes
2013 (67th)	Matilda the Musical	Rob Howell
2013 (67th)	Pippin	Dominique Lemieux
2014 (68th)
2014 (68th)	A Gentleman's Guide to Love and Murder	Linda Cho
2014 (68th)	After Midnight	Isabel Toledo
2014 (68th)	Bullets Over Broadway	William Ivey Long
2014 (68th)	Hedwig and the Angry Inch	Arianne Phillips
2015 (69th)
2015 (69th)	The King and I	Catherine Zuber
2015 (69th)	An American in Paris	Bob Crowley
2015 (69th)	On the Twentieth Century	William Ivey Long
2015 (69th)	Something Rotten!	Gregg Barnes
2016 (70th)
2016 (70th)	Hamilton	Paul Tazewell
2016 (70th)	She Loves Me	Jeff Mahshie
2016 (70th)	Shuffle Along, or, the Making of the Musical Sensation of 1921 and All That Followed	Ann Roth
2016 (70th)	Tuck Everlasting	Gregg Barnes
2017 (71st)
2017 (71st)	Hello, Dolly!	Santo Loquasto
2017 (71st)	Anastasia	Linda Cho
2017 (71st)	Natasha, Pierre & The Great Comet of 1812	Paloma Young
2017 (71st)	War Paint	Catherine Zuber
2018 (72nd)
2018 (72nd)	My Fair Lady	Catherine Zuber
2018 (72nd)	Carousel	Ann Roth
2018 (72nd)	Mean Girls	Gregg Barnes
2018 (72nd)	Once on This Island	Clint Ramos
2018 (72nd)	SpongeBob SquarePants	David Zinn
2019 (73rd)
2019 (73rd)	The Cher Show	Bob Mackie
2019 (73rd)	Ain’t Too Proud	Paul Tazewell
2019 (73rd)	Beetlejuice	William Ivey Long
2019 (73rd)	Hadestown	Michael Krass
2019 (73rd)	Tootsie	William Ivey Long

=== 2020s ===
Year	Production	Nominees
2020 (74th)
2020 (74th)	Moulin Rouge! The Musical	Catherine Zuber
2020 (74th)	Jagged Little Pill	Emily Rebholz
2020 (74th)	Tina: The Tina Turner Musical	Mark Thompson
2022 (75th)
2022 (75th)	SIX: The Musical	Gabriella Slade
2022 (75th)	Caroline, or Change	Fly James
2022 (75th)	Diana: The Musical	William Ivey Long
2022 (75th)	MJ	Paul Tazewell
2022 (75th)	The Music Man	Santo Loquasto
2022 (75th)	Paradise Square	Toni-Leslie James
2023 (76th)
2023 (76th)	Some Like It Hot	Gregg Barnes
2023 (76th)	& Juliet	Paloma Young
2023 (76th)	KPOP	Clint Ramos and Sophia Choi
2023 (76th)	Lerner & Loewe's Camelot	Jennifer Moeller
2023 (76th)	New York, New York	Donna Zakowska
2023 (76th)	Parade	Susan Hilferty
2024 (77th)
2024 (77th)	The Great Gatsby	Linda Cho
2024 (77th)	Cabaret at the Kit Kat Club	Tom Scutt
2024 (77th)	Hell's Kitchen	Dede Ayite
2024 (77th)	Suffs	Paul Tazewell
2024 (77th)	Water for Elephants	David Israel Reynoso
2025 (78th)
2025 (78th)	Death Becomes Her	Paul Tazewell
2025 (78th)	Boop! The Musical	Gregg Barnes
2025 (78th)	Buena Vista Social Club	Dede Ayite
2025 (78th)	Just in Time	Catherine Zuber
2025 (78th)	Maybe Happy Ending	Clint Ramos
2026 (79th)
2026 (79th)	Cats: The Jellicle Ball	Qween Jean
2026 (79th)	The Lost Boys	Ryan Park
2026 (79th)	Ragtime	Linda Cho
2026 (79th)	The Rocky Horror Show	David I. Reynoso
2026 (79th)	Schmigadoon!	Linda Cho

== Trivia ==
In 2010, Santo Loquasto received a nomination for Best Costume Design for a Musical for Ragtime. Loquasto, who was previously nominated for the same show in the same category in 1998, was later disqualified because the designs were predominantly recycled work from the earlier production. No replacement was made for the nomination.

== Multiple wins ==
Award wins includes the former Best Costume Design category and the nominations includes only the specific category.

6 Wins

- Florence Klotz
- William Ivey Long

5 Wins

- Catherine Zuber

3 Wins

- Gregg Barnes
- Cecil Beaton
- Patricia Zipprodt

2 Wins

- Theoni V. Aldredge
- Lucinda Ballard
- Linda Cho
- Willa Kim
- Franne Lee
- Santo Loquasto
- John Napier
- Martin Pakledinaz
- Paul Tazewell

== Multiple nominations ==
9 nominations

- Gregg Barnes

8 nominations

- William Ivey Long
- Paul Tazewell
- Catherine Zuber

5 nominations

- Linda Cho

4 nominations

- Martin Pakledinaz

3 nominations

- Susan Hilferty
- Clint Ramos
- Ann Roth

2 nominations

- Dede Ayite
- Bob Crowley
- Tim Hatley
- Santo Loquasto
- Paloma Young

== See also ==
- Tony Award for Best Costume Design in a Play
- Drama Desk Award for Outstanding Costume Design of a Musical
- Laurence Olivier Award for Best Costume Design
- List of Tony Award-nominated productions
