= Christopher Gattelli =

American choreographer, performer and theatre director

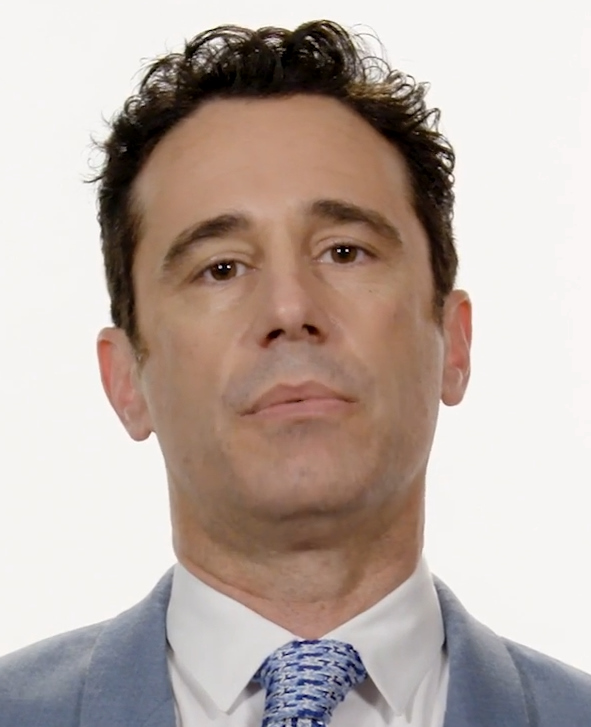
- Gattelli in 2018
- Born: November 1, 1972 (age 54)
- Occupations: Choreographer; director; dancer

Christopher Gattelli (born November 1, 1972) is an American choreographer, performer and theatre director.

== Early life and career ==
Gattelli grew up in Bristol, Pennsylvania. He started dancing at the age of 8 and is a "Star Search" grand champion. In high school, after classes, e took dance classes at Alvin Ailey Dance half the day, As a performer, he appeared in How to Succeed in Business Without Really Trying (revival), Fosse, and Pouncival in Cats.

== Choreographer/Director ==
Broadway Credits
Year	Title	Director	Choreographer
2003	Chess (Benefit Concert)	No	Yes
2004	Hair (Benefit Concert)	Yes	Yes
2006	Martin Short: Fame Becomes Me	No	Yes
2006	High Fidelity	No	Yes
2007	The Ritz	No	Yes
2008	Sunday in the Park With George	No	Musical Staging
2008	South Pacific	No	Musical Staging
2008	13	No	Yes
2009	Chance & Chemistry (Benefit)	Yes	Yes
2010	Women on the Verge of a Nervous Breakdown	No	Yes
2011	Godspell	No	Yes
2012	Newsies	No	Yes
2014	Casa Valentina	No	Dance Consultant
2015	The King and I	No	Yes
2015	Amazing Grace	No	Yes
2017	War Paint	No	Yes
2017	SpongeBob Squarepants	No	Yes
2018	My Fair Lady	No	Yes
2018	The Cher Show	No	Yes
2024	Mother Play	No	Yes
2024	Death Becomes Her	Yes	Yes
2026	Schmigadoon!	Yes	Yes
2026	The Fantasticks	Yes	Yes
2027	The Sound of Music	No	Yes

Christopher Gattelli is best known for his work on the 2012 Broadway musical Newsies.

Gattelli has choreographed several special benefit concerts, including Chess (2003), Hair (also co-director, Actor's Fund, 2004), and Chance and Chemistry: A Centennial Celebration of Frank Loesser (also directed, Actors Fund, October 2009).

His Off-Broadway choreographic work includes Adrift in Macao (2007, also Philadelphia, PA 2005), How to Save the World and Find True Love in 90 Minutes (also director, 2006), I Love You Because (2006), Altar Boyz (2005), tick, tick...BOOM!, Dogfight, and Bat Boy: The Musical (2001). In regional theatre he is the choreographer for The Baker's Wife (Paper Mill Playhouse, Millburn, New Jersey, 2005), Tom Jones (2004), tick, tick...BOOM! (2004, also London Fringe, 2005), Me and My Girl, and O. Henry's Lovers (Goodspeed Opera House, 2003). He directed Jim Henson's Emmet Otter's Jug-Band Christmas at The Goodspeed Opera House, Connecticut in 2008, and choreographed Julie Andrews' The Great American Mousical there in 2012. His production of The Jungle Book played the Goodman Theatre and Huntington Theatre Company in 2013. He was the director of the musical spoof SILENCE! The Musical, which ran in 2005 at NYCFringe. Other West End and London credits include South Pacific and Sunday in the Park with George. He is in charge of musical staging for Little Miss Sunshine.

He collaborated with Stephen Flaherty on the world premiere of In Your Arms, which he directed and choreographed for the New York Stage and Film's Powerhouse Theater at Vassar in 2014. He directed and choreographed In Your Arms for a production at the Old Globe Theatre in September 2015.

Gattelli directed and choreographed the Spring 2014 lab of RKO's Top Hat in New York. This was a new version of the 2011 stage version that ran in London and the UK, and was being worked on by Gatelli and Chad Beguelin. The production "is still several seasons off", according to Gatelli in January 2017.

His choreography can also be seen in the Coen brothers feature Hail, Caesar!

He was the resident choreographer for The Rosie O'Donnell Show.

Gattelli choreographed the American musical comedy television series Schmigadoon! for Apple TV+ in 2020 and 2023.

== Personal life ==
He is openly gay.

== Awards ==
Year	Award	Category	Title	Result
2001	Lucille Lortel Award	Outstanding Choreographer	Bat Boy: The Musical	Won
2005	Drama Desk Award	Outstanding Choreography	Altar Boyz	Nominated
2005	Lucille Lortel Award	Outstanding Choreographer	Altar Boyz	Won
2008	Tony Awards	Best Choreography	South Pacific	Nominated
2012	Outer Critics Circle Awards	Outstanding Choreography	Newsies	Won
2012	Drama Desk Award	Outstanding Choreography	Newsies	Won
2012	Tony Awards	Best Choreography	Newsies	Won
2015	Tony Awards	Best Choreography	The King and I	Nominated
2018	Tony Awards	Best Choreography	My Fair Lady	Nominated
2018	Tony Awards	Best Choreography	SpongeBob SquarePants	Nominated
2018	Drama Desk Award	Outstanding Choreography	SpongeBob SquarePants	Nominated
2025	Drama League Awards	Outstanding Direction of a Musical	Death Becomes Her	Nominated
2025	Outer Critics Circle Awards	Outstanding Direction of a Musical	Death Becomes Her	Nominated
2025	Outer Critics Circle Awards	Outstanding Choreography	Death Becomes Her	Nominated
2025	Tony Awards	Best Direction of a Musical	Death Becomes Her	Nominated
2025	Tony Awards	Best Choreography	Death Becomes Her	Nominated
2026	Tony Award	Best Direction of a Musical	Schmigadoon!	Nominated
2026	Tony Award	Best Choreography	Schmigadoon!	Nominated
2026	Outer Critics Circle Award	Outstanding Choreography	Schmigadoon!	Won
2026	Drama Desk Award	Outstanding Choreography	Schmigadoon!	Won
2026	Chita Rivera Award	Outstanding Choreography in a Broadway Show	Schmigadoon!	Won
