= Tilly Grimes =

British costume designer

Tilly Grimes is a British costume designer for theatre, opera, and film. She works between London, Dublin and New York. She is a guest artist / guest designer at The Juilliard School, New York University, Fordham University, University of Rochester (School of Art & Sciences), The Curtis Institute and Trinity College Dublin. She is co-artistic director of London/Parisian Theatre Company SavageCharm.

Grimes received her Master of Fine Arts (MFA) from the New York University's Tisch School of the Arts and has taught at Brown University directing the MFA program.

She began her stage costume design career in 2007 at the Edinburgh & Dublin Fringe Festival and has worked consistently in mainly theatre since then.

== Awards ==
- The Balsamo Grant for Emerging Immigrant Artists
- The Irish Arts Design Award
- Irish Times Theatre Award Nomination.

== Theatre Credits ==
Grimes has worked on productions for the Oregon Shakespeare Festival, Two Rivers Theatre Company, Trinity Repertory Company, New World Stages, La MaMa, Clubbed Thumb, Here Arts Centre, New Georges, Ars Nova, Theatre Row New York, Westport County Playhouse and Shakespeare on the Sound.

== Film Credits ==
Grimes was the costume designer on three short films, Romeo Vs Juliet (2009), When's Lunch? (2011), Good Intentions (2011) and a feature film We are the Hartmans (2011) and is credited as a makeup artist on the Television series Billy on the Street with Billy Eichner (2012). There is also a credit as a production designer and as actor.
