= Gregg Barnes =

American costume designer

Gregg Barnes is an American costume designer for stage and film. Barnes is a three-time winner of the Tony Award for Best Costume Design in a Musical for his work on the Broadway productions of The Drowsy Chaperone (2006), Follies (2011), and Some Like It Hot (2022).

== Education ==
Barnes has a MFA in Design from New York University and an undergraduate degree from San Diego University.

== Career ==
Barnes grew up in the San Diego, California area and credits seeing the circus, ice shows, and a local production of As You Like It in his youth as his inspiration to pursue a career in the theatre. He worked at Grossmont College in the Costume Department with other costume designers and artists such as Clark Mires, James "Biff" Baker, and Rebecca McKee. He taught at the New York University graduate school for 20 years. Barnes served as the resident costume designer for Paper Mill Playhouse, in Millburn, New Jersey for 9 years.

== Broadway credits ==
- Side Show (1997)
- Flower Drum Song (2002)
- Dirty Rotten Scoundrels (2005)
- The Drowsy Chaperone (2006)
- Legally Blonde (2007)
- To Be Or Not To Be (2008)
- Bye Bye Birdie (2009)
- Elf the Musical (2010)/(2012)
- Follies (2011)
- Kinky Boots (2013)
- Aladdin (2014)
- Something Rotten! (2015)
- Tuck Everlasting (2016)
- Mean Girls (2017)
- Some Like It Hot (2022)
- Boop! The Musical (2025)

== Other credits ==
- Kathy and Mo Show (Westside Arts Theater, New York City, 1989)
- Cinderella (New York City Opera, 1993)
- The Merry Widow (New York City Opera, 1996; also televised)
- You Never Know (Paper Mill Playhouse, Millburn, New Jersey, 1996)
- The Wizard of Oz (Madison Square Garden, New York, New York, 1997)
- Follies (Paper Mill Playhouse, Millburn, New Jersey, 1998)
- Ringling Bros. and Barnum & Bailey Circus (National tour, 2001)
- Princess Classics on Ice (Disney on Ice tour, 2002)
- The Radio City Christmas Spectacular (2003)
- Lucky Duck (Old Globe Theatre, San Diego, California, 2004)
- On the Record (US tour, 2004)
- Allegro (Signature Theatre, Arlington, Virginia, 2004; Helen Hayes Award)
- Disney Live! Winnie the Pooh (Beacon Theatre, New York City, 2005)
- Mame (Kennedy Center, 2006)
- Follies (Encores!, 2007)
- Minsky's (Ahmanson Theatre, Los Angeles, California, 2009)
- Follies (Kennedy Center, 2011)
- "Iceploration", Busch Gardens Tampa, FL (February 2, 2012), Theme Park
- Dreamgirls, Savoy Theatre, London (November 2016)

== Awards and nominations ==
Year	Award	Category	Nominee	Result
2003	Tony Award	Best Costume Design	Flower Drum Song	Nominated
2006	Tony Award	Best Costume Design in a Musical	The Drowsy Chaperone	Won
2006	Drama Desk Award	Outstanding Costume Design	The Drowsy Chaperone	Won
2006	Outer Critics Circle Award	Outstanding Costume Design	The Drowsy Chaperone	Won
2007	Tony Award	Best Costume Design in a Musical	Legally Blonde	Nominated
2012	Tony Award	Best Costume Design in a Musical	Follies	Won
2012	Drama Desk Award	Outstanding Costume Design	Follies	Won
2012	Outer Critics Circle Award	Outstanding Costume Design	Follies	Nominated
2013	Tony Award	Best Costume Design in a Musical	Kinky Boots	Nominated
2013	Outer Critics Circle Award	Outstanding Costume Design	Kinky Boots	style="background: #FFE3E3; color: black; vertical-align: middle; text-align: center; " class="no table-no2 notheme"|Nominated
2014	Outer Critics Circle Award	Outstanding Costume Design	Aladdin	Nominated
2015	Tony Award	Best Costume Design in a Musical	Something Rotten!	Nominated
2015	Outer Critics Circle Award	Outstanding Costume Design	Something Rotten!	Nominated
2016	Tony Award	Best Costume Design in a Musical	Tuck Everlasting	Nominated
2017	WhatsOnStage Award	Best Costume Design	Aladdin	Won
2018	Tony Award	Best Costume Design in a Musical	Mean Girls	Nominated
2023	Tony Award	Best Costume Design in a Musical	Some Like It Hot	Won
