= List of awards and nominations received by Tom Stoppard =

Sir Tom Stoppard awards and nominations
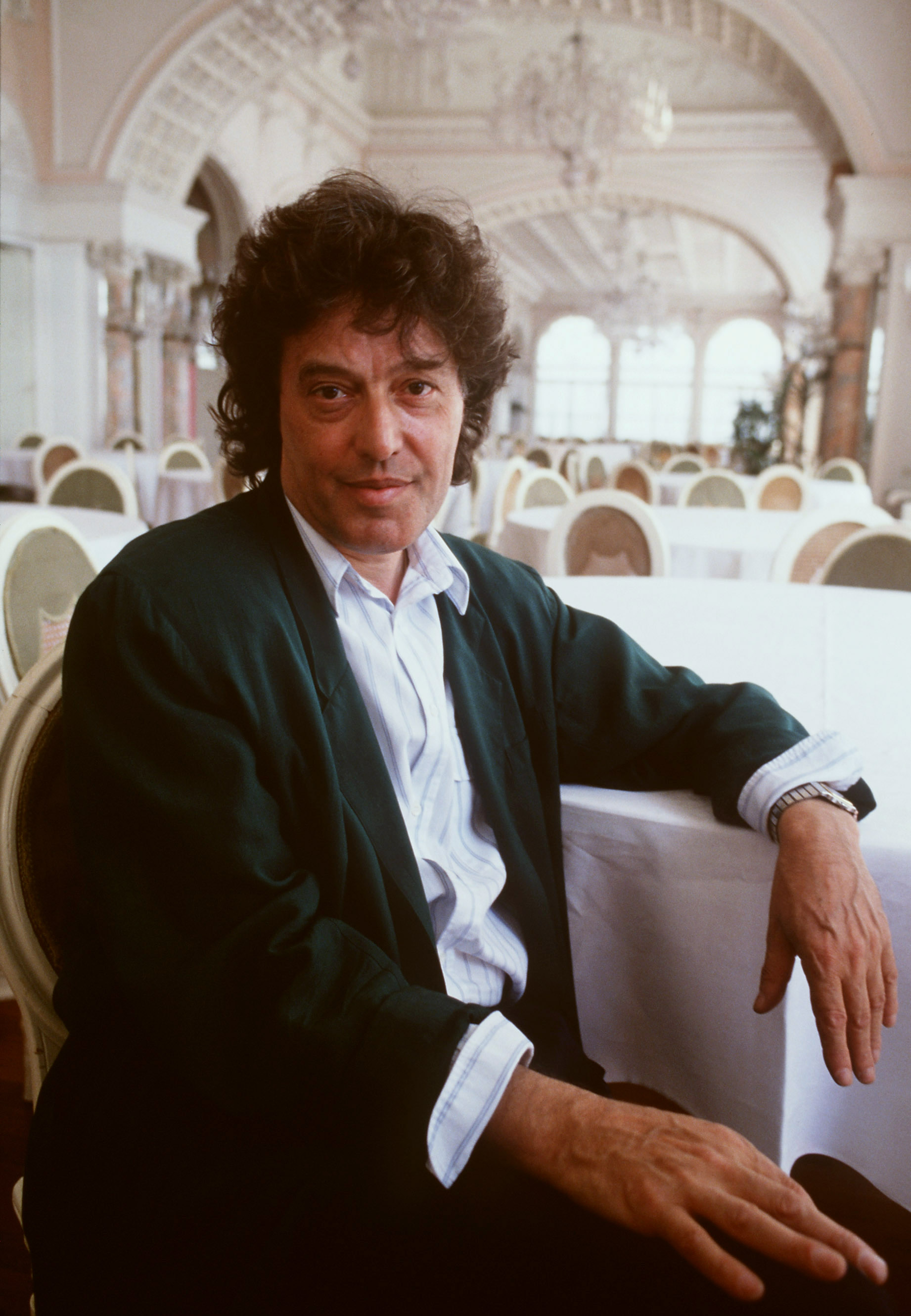
Awards and nominations
Award	Wins	Nominations
Academy Awards	1	2
BAFTA Awards	0	5
Golden Globe Award	1	1
Emmy Awards	0	1
Tony Awards	5	8
Olivier Awards	3	8

Totals (Note: Certain award groups do not simply award one winner. They acknowledge several different recipients, have runners-up, and have third place. Since this is a specific recognition and is different from losing an award, runner-up mentions are considered wins in this award tally. For simplification and to avoid errors, each award in this list has been presumed to have had a prior nomination.)
- Wins: 32
- Nominations: 67

Sir Tom Stoppard (1937 – 2025) was a Czech-born British playwright and screenwriter. He received numerous accolades including an Academy Award, a Golden Globe Award, three Laurence Olivier Awards, and five Tony Awards as well as nominations for five BAFTA Awards, and a Primetime Emmy Award. He was made a Commander of the Order of the British Empire in 1978 and a Knight Bachelor in 1997 by Queen Elizabeth II.

As a playwright, he was honored on both Broadway and the West End stage. For the former, he won the five Tony Awards for Best Play for the absurdist tragicomedy Rosencrantz and Guildenstern Are Dead (1968), the comedy Travesties (1976), the romance drama The Real Thing (1984), the epic trilogy The Coast of Utopia (2007), and the Holocaust drama Leopoldstadt (2023). For the later, he won three Laurence Olivier Awards, two for Best New Play for epic Arcadia (1994) and Leopoldstadt (2020) and one for Best New Comedy Play for Heroes (2006).

Stoppard wrote numerous screenplays for film. He gained acclaim for co-writing the Terry Gilliam-directed dystopian science fiction black comedy Brazil (1985) for which he was nominated for the Academy Award for Best Original Screenplay. He wrote the Steven Spielberg coming-of-age war drama epic Empire of the Sun (1987) for which he was nominated for the BAFTA Award for Best Adapted Screenplay. For his film adaptation of his own play, Rosencrantz & Guildenstern Are Dead (1990), he won the Golden Lion at the Venice International Film Festival.

He gained widespread acclaim for co-writing the John Madden directed period romantic drama Shakespeare in Love (1997) for which he earned the Academy Award for Best Original Screenplay, the Golden Globe Award for Best Screenplay and the Silver Bear at the Berlin International Film Festival as well as a nomination for the BAFTA Award for Best Original Screenplay. He wrote the film adaptation of Anna Karenina (2012) earning a BAFTA Award for Outstanding British Film nomination. On television, he wrote the BBC Two limited series Parade's End (2013) for which he was nominated for two British Academy Television Awards (for Best Miniseries and Best Writer – Drama Series) and a Primetime Emmy Award.

Stoppard was elected a Fellow of the Royal Society of Literature in 1972, received the Shakespeare Prize in 1979, was inducted in the American Theater Hall of Fame in 1999, received the Writers Guild of America Laurel Award for Screenwriting Achievement in 2013, and the David Cohen Prize in 2017. Stoppard also received Honorary degrees from Yale University in 2000, the University of Cambridge in 2000, and the University of Oxford in 2013. He was named Honorary Patronage of the University Philosophical Society at Trinity College Dublin in 2009.

== Major associations ==
=== Academy Awards ===
Year	Category	Nominated work	Result	Ref.
1985	Best Original Screenplay	Brazil	Nominated	
1998	Best Original Screenplay	Shakespeare in Love	Won	

=== BAFTA Awards ===
Year	Category	Nominated work	Result	Ref.
British Academy Film Award
1987	Best Adapted Screenplay	Empire of the Sun	Nominated	
1998	Best Original Screenplay	Shakespeare in Love	Nominated	
2012	Outstanding British Film	Anna Karenina	Nominated	
British Academy Television Award
2013	Best Miniseries	Parade's End	Nominated	
2013	Best Writer - Drama Series	Parade's End	Nominated	

=== Critics' Choice Awards ===
Year	Category	Nominated work	Result	Ref.
Critics' Choice Movie Awards
1998	Best Screenplay	Shakespeare in Love	Won	

=== Emmy Award ===
Year	Category	Nominated work	Result	Ref.
Primetime Emmy Awards
2013	Outstanding Writing for a Miniseries, Movie or a Dramatic Special	Parade's End	Nominated	

=== Golden Globe Awards ===
Year	Category	Nominated work	Result	Ref.
1998	Best Screenplay	Shakespeare in Love	Won	

=== Laurence Olivier Awards ===
Year	Category	Nominated work	Result	Ref.
1979	Best New Play	Night and Day	Nominated	
1979	Best New Play	Undiscovered Country	Nominated	
1981	Best New Comedy	On the Razzle	Nominated	
1994	Best New Play	Arcadia	Won	
2003	Best New Play	The Coast of Utopia	Nominated	
2006	Best New Comedy	Heroes	Won	
2007	Best New Play	Rock 'n' Roll	Nominated	
2020	Best New Play	Leopoldstadt	Won	

=== Tony Awards ===
Year	Category	Nominated work	Result	Ref.
1968	Best Play	Rosencrantz and Guildenstern Are Dead	Won	
1976	Best Play	Travesties	Won	
1984	Best Play	The Real Thing	Won	
1995	Best Play	Arcadia	Nominated	
2001	Best Play	The Invention of Love	Nominated	
2007	Best Play	The Coast of Utopia	Won	
2008	Best Play	Rock 'n' Roll	Nominated	
2023	Best Play	Leopoldstadt	Won	

== Miscellaneous awards ==
Organizations	Year	Category	Work	Result	Ref.
Berlin International Film Festival	1999	Silver Bear	Shakespeare in Love	Won	
Drama Desk Award	1995	Outstanding Play	Arcadia	Nominated	
Drama Desk Award	2001	Outstanding Play	The Invention of Love	Nominated	
Drama Desk Award	2007	Outstanding Play	The Coast of Utopia	Won	
Drama Desk Award	2008	Outstanding Play	Rock 'n' Roll	Nominated	
Drama Desk Award	2023	Outstanding Play	Leopoldstadt	Won	
Evening Standard Award	1967	Most Promising Playwright (UK)	Tom Stoppard	Won	
Evening Standard Award	1974	Best Comedy of the Year (UK)	Travesties	Won	
Evening Standard Award	1978	Best Play (UK)	Night and Day	Won	
Evening Standard Award	1982	Best Play (UK)	The Real Thing	Won	
Evening Standard Award	1993	Best Play of the Year (UK)	Arcadia	Won	
Evening Standard Award	1997	Best Play (UK)	The Invention of Love	Won	
John Whiting Award	1967	New & Distinctive Dramatic Writing	Rosencrantz and Guildenstern are Dead	Won	
London Theatre Critics Award	1967	Best New Play (UK)	Rosencrantz and Guildenstern Are Dead	Won	
London Theatre Critics Award	1972	Best New Play (UK)	Jumpers	Won	
New York Drama Critics' Circle	1968	Best Play	Rosencrantz and Guildenstern Are Dead	Won	
New York Drama Critics' Circle	1976	Best Play	Travesties	Won	
New York Drama Critics' Circle	1984	Best Play	The Real Thing	Won	
New York Drama Critics' Circle	1995	Best Play	Arcadia	Won	
New York Drama Critics' Circle	2001	Best Play	The Invention of Love	Won	
New York Drama Critics' Circle	2007	Best Play	The Coast of Utopia	Won	
New York Drama Critics' Circle	2023	Best Foreign Play	Leopoldstadt	Won	
Prix Italia	1968	Best Play	Albert's Bridge – (Italy)	Won	
Venice International Film Festival	1990	Golden Lion	Rosencrantz and Guildenstern are Dead	Won	

== Honorary awards ==
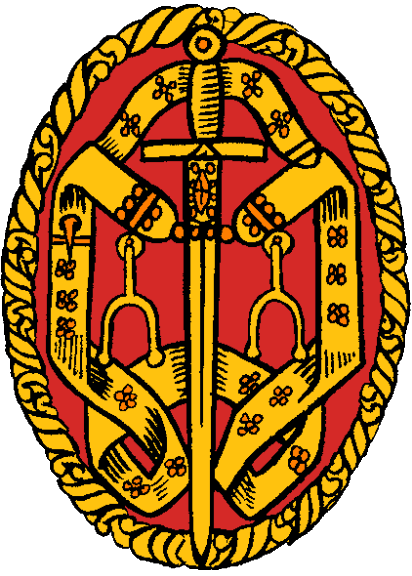
Insignia of Knight Bachelor

Organizations	Year	Award	Result	Ref.
Royal Society of Literature	1972	Elected as a Fellow	Honored	
Queen Elizabeth II	1978	Commander of the Order of the British Empire	Honored	
Alfred Toepfer Foundation	1979	Shakespeare Prize	Honored	
Queen Elizabeth II	1997	Knight Bachelor	Honored	
American Theater Hall of Fame	1999	Induction	Honored	
Queen Elizabeth II	2000	Order of Merit	Honored	
The London Library	2002	Named President of the Institution	Honored	
The Critics' Circle	2008	Distinguished Service to the Arts Award	Honored	
The Imperial Family of Japan The Japan Art Association	2009	Praemium Imperiale	Honored	
PEN Pinter Prize	2013	Lifetime Achievement Award	Honored	
Writers Guild of America	2013	Laurel Award for Screenwriting Achievement	Honored	
PEN/Allen Foundation	2015	Literary Service Award	Honored	
British Academy	2017	Honorary Fellow	Honored	
America Award in Literature	2017	Lifetime Achievement Award	Honored	
Arts Council England	2017	David Cohen Prize	Honored	

== Honorary degrees ==
Organizations	Year	Award	Result	Ref.
Yale University	2000	Honorary Doctor of Letters	Honored	
University of Cambridge	2000	Honorary Doctor of Letters	Honored	
Trinity College Dublin	2009	Patronage of the University Philosophical Society	Honored	
University of Oxford	2013	Honorary Doctor of Letters	Honored	
