= 61st Tony Awards =

2007 US theatrical awards ceremony

- Official poster for the 61st annual Tony Awards
- Date: June 10, 2007
- Location: Radio City Music Hall, New York City, New York
- Hosted by: none

Highlights
- Most wins: Spring Awakening (8)
- Most nominations: Spring Awakening (11)
- Website: tonyawards.com

Television/radio coverage
- Network: CBS
- Viewership: 5.7 million
- Produced by: Ricky Kirshner; Glenn Weiss
- Directed by: Glenn Weiss

The 61st Annual Tony Award ceremony was held on June 10, 2007, at Radio City Music Hall, with CBS television broadcasting live. The cut-off date for eligibility was May 9, meaning that to be qualified for the 2006–2007 season, shows must have opened before or on this date.

Jane Krakowski and Taye Diggs announced the nominations on May 15, 2007 with leading the nominations with elevent, followed by The Coast of Utopia, and Grey Gardens with ten nominations each. Spring Awakening was the most awarded musical with eight awards, including for Best Musical.

This Tony Awards telecast won an Emmy Award, Outstanding Special Class Program, at the 59th Creative Arts Emmy Awards presented on September 8, 2007. Glenn Weiss, the director of the awards show, received a Directors Guild of America Awards nomination, Outstanding Directorial Achievement in Musical Variety (television).

== Eligibility ==
Shows that opened on Broadway during the 2006–07 season before May 10, 2007, are eligible.

Original plays

- The Coast of Utopia
- Coram Boy
- Deuce
- Frost/Nixon
- The Little Dog Laughed
- Losing Louis
- Radio Golf
- The Vertical Hour
- The Year of Magical Thinking

Original musicals

- Curtains
- Dr. Seuss' How the Grinch Stole Christmas! The Musical
- Grey Gardens
- High Fidelity
- Legally Blonde
- LoveMusik
- Martin Short: Fame Becomes Me
- Mary Poppins
- The Pirate Queen
- Spring Awakening
- The Times They Are a-Changin'

Play revivals

- Butley
- Heartbreak House
- Inherit the Wind
- Journey's End
- A Moon for the Misbegotten
- Prelude to a Kiss
- Talk Radio
- Translations

Musical revivals

- The Apple Tree
- A Chorus Line
- Company
- Les Misérables
- 110 in the Shade

== The ceremony ==
As with the 2006 Tony Award ceremony, there was no formal host and the show was emceed by the presenters.

=== Presenters ===
- Jane Alexander
- Christina Applegate
- Zach Braff
- Harry Connick Jr.
- Claire Danes
- Jeff Daniels
- Brian Dennehy
- Taye Diggs
- Harvey Fierstein
- Carla Gugino
- Marvin Hamlisch
- Marcia Gay Harden
- Neil Patrick Harris
- Anne Heche
- Marg Helgenberger
- Christian Hoff
- Felicity Huffman
- Mark Indelicato
- Eddie Izzard
- John Kander
- Jane Krakowski
- Angela Lansbury
- Robert Sean Leonard
- John Mahoney
- Audra McDonald
- Idina Menzel
- Bebe Neuwirth
- Cynthia Nixon
- Donny Osmond
- Bernadette Peters
- David Hyde Pierce
- Christopher Plummer
- Daniel Reichard
- Anika Noni Rose
- Liev Schreiber
- Kevin Spacey
- J. Robert Spencer
- Tommy Tune
- John Turturro
- Usher
- Ben Vereen
- Vanessa L. Williams
- Patrick Wilson
- Rainn Wilson
- John Lloyd Young

=== Performances ===
The opening number showed the cast of A Chorus Line in rehearsal clothing dancing and singing "I Hope I Get It," outside of Radio City Music Hall accompanied by Marvin Hamlisch on the piano, with the cast then ending on the stage in full gold costumes performing "One".

The following musicals or performers performed:

- 110 in the Shade ("Raunchy") – Audra McDonald and John Cullum
- Grey Gardens ("The Revolutionary Costume for Today") – Christine Ebersole
- Spring Awakening (medley of "Mama Who Bore Me," "Mama Who Bore Me (Reprise)," "The Bitch of Living," and "Totally Fucked")* – Company
- Curtains ("Show People") – Company
- Mary Poppins (medley of "Chim Chim Cher-ee," "Step in Time," and "Anything Can Happen") – Company
- Company ("Being Alive") – Raul Esparza
- "American Idol" winner and replacement star Fantasia Barrino performed a song from The Color Purple in honor of Regional Theater Tony Winner Alliance Theater in Atlanta, GA, where the show premiered.

*(Because it was a live TV performance, some of the lyrics to "The Bitch of Living" and "Totally Fucked" were altered for that night's performance.)

== Winners and nominees ==
Nominations were annuncied on May 15, 2007. Winners are in bold.

Best Play	Best Musical
**The Coast of Utopia – Tom Stoppard**; Frost/Nixon – Peter Morgan; The Little Dog Laughed – Douglas Carter Beane; Radio Golf – August Wilson	**Spring Awakening**; Curtains; Grey Gardens; Mary Poppins
Best Revival of a Play	Best Revival of a Musical
**Journey's End**; Inherit the Wind; Talk Radio; Translations	**Company**; The Apple Tree; A Chorus Line; 110 in the Shade
Best Performance by a Leading Actor in a Play	Best Performance by a Leading Actress in a Play
**Frank Langella – Frost/Nixon as Richard Nixon**; Boyd Gaines – Journey's End as Lieut. Osborne; Brían F. O'Byrne – The Coast of Utopia as Alexander Herzen; Christopher Plummer – Inherit the Wind as Henry Drummond; Liev Schreiber – Talk Radio as Barry Champlain	**Julie White – The Little Dog Laughed as Diane**; Eve Best – A Moon for the Misbegotten as Josie Hogan; Swoosie Kurtz – Heartbreak House as Hesione Hushabye; Angela Lansbury – Deuce as Leona Mullen; Vanessa Redgrave – The Year of Magical Thinking as Joan Didion
Best Performance by a Leading Actor in a Musical	Best Performance by a Leading Actress in a Musical
**David Hyde Pierce – Curtains as Lieut. Frank Cioffi**; Michael Cerveris – LoveMusik as Kurt Weill; Raúl Esparza – Company as Robert; Jonathan Groff – Spring Awakening as Melchior Gabor; Gavin Lee – Mary Poppins as Bert	**Christine Ebersole – Grey Gardens as 'Little Edie' Beale**; Laura Bell Bundy – Legally Blonde as Elle Woods; Audra McDonald – 110 in the Shade as Lizzie Curry; Debra Monk – Curtains as Carmen Bernstein; Donna Murphy – LoveMusik as Lotte Lenya
Best Performance by a Featured Actor in a Play	Best Performance by a Featured Actress in a Play
**Billy Crudup – The Coast of Utopia as Vissarion Belinsky**; Ethan Hawke – The Coast of Utopia as Michael Bakunin; Anthony Chisholm – Radio Golf as Elder Joseph Barlow; John Earl Jelks – Radio Golf as Sterling Johnson; Stark Sands – Journey's End as Lieut. Raleigh	**Jennifer Ehle – The Coast of Utopia as Various Characters**; Martha Plimpton – The Coast of Utopia as Varenka/Natasha Tuchkov; Xanthe Elbrick – Coram Boy as Alexander/Aaron; Dana Ivey – Butley as Edna Shaft; Jan Maxwell – Coram Boy as Mrs. Lynch
Best Performance by a Featured Actor in a Musical	Best Performance by a Featured Actress in a Musical
**John Gallagher Jr. – Spring Awakening as Moritz Stiefel**; Brooks Ashmanskas – Martin Short: Fame Becomes Me as Various Characters; Christian Borle – Legally Blonde as Emmett Forrest; John Cullum – 110 in the Shade as H.C. Curry; David Pittu – LoveMusik as Bertolt Brecht	**Mary Louise Wilson – Grey Gardens as 'Big Edie' Beale**; Charlotte d'Amboise – A Chorus Line as Cassie Ferguson; Rebecca Luker – Mary Poppins as Winifred Banks; Orfeh – Legally Blonde as Paulette Bonafonté; Karen Ziemba – Curtains as Georgia Hendricks
Best Book of a Musical	Best Original Score (Music and/or Lyrics) Written for the Theatre
**Steven Sater – Spring Awakening**; Rupert Holmes and Peter Stone – Curtains; Doug Wright – Grey Gardens; Heather Hach – Legally Blonde	**Spring Awakening – Duncan Sheik (music) and Steven Sater (lyrics)**; Curtains – John Kander (music) and Fred Ebb, Kander and Rupert Holmes (lyrics); Grey Gardens – Scott Frankel (music) and Michael Korie (lyrics); Legally Blonde – Laurence O'Keefe and Nell Benjamin (music and lyrics)
Best Scenic Design of a Play	Best Scenic Design of a Musical
**Bob Crowley and Scott Pask – The Coast of Utopia**; Jonathan Fensom – Journey's End; David Gallo – Radio Golf; Ti Green and Melly Still – Coram Boy	**Bob Crowley – Mary Poppins**; Christine Jones – Spring Awakening; Anna Louizos – High Fidelity; Allen Moyer – Grey Gardens
Best Costume Design of a Play	Best Costume Design of a Musical
**Catherine Zuber – The Coast of Utopia**; Ti Green and Melly Still – Coram Boy; Jane Greenwood – Heartbreak House; Santo Loquasto – Inherit the Wind	**William Ivey Long – Grey Gardens**; Gregg Barnes – Legally Blonde; Bob Crowley – Mary Poppins; Susan Hilferty – Spring Awakening
Best Lighting Design of a Play	Best Lighting Design of a Musical
**Brian MacDevitt, Kenneth Posner, and Natasha Katz – The Coast of Utopia**; Paule Constable – Coram Boy; Brian MacDevitt – Inherit the Wind; Jason Taylor – Journey's End	**Kevin Adams – Spring Awakening**; Christopher Akerlind – 110 in the Shade; Howard Harrison – Mary Poppins; Peter Kaczorowski – Grey Gardens
Best Direction of a Play	Best Direction of a Musical
**Jack O'Brien – The Coast of Utopia**; Michael Grandage – Frost/Nixon; David Grindley – Journey's End; Melly Still – Coram Boy	**Michael Mayer – Spring Awakening**; John Doyle – Company; Scott Ellis – Curtains; Michael Greif – Grey Gardens
Best Choreography	Best Orchestrations
**Bill T. Jones – Spring Awakening**; Rob Ashford – Curtains; Matthew Bourne and Stephen Mear – Mary Poppins; Jerry Mitchell – Legally Blonde	**Duncan Sheik – Spring Awakening**; Bruce Coughlin – Grey Gardens; Jonathan Tunick – LoveMusik; Jonathan Tunick – 110 in the Shade

== In Memoriam ==
- Patrick Quinn
- Kitty Carlisle Hart
- Charles Nelson Reilly
- Florence Klotz
- Bob Fennell
- Anne Pitoniak
- Howard Rosenstone
- Jose Vega
- Daniel McDonald
- Sidney Sheldon
- Betty Comden
- Brett Adams
- Ian Richardson
- Arthur Hill
- Mako
- Isabel Bigley
- Robert Earl Jones
- Barnard Hughes
- Jay Harnick
- Roscoe Lee Browne
- G. Eric Muratalla
- Gretchen Wyler
- Lloyd Richards
- Henry Hewes
- Curt Dempster

== Special Tony Award ==
Tony Award for Best Special Theatrical Event

- Jay Johnson: The Two and Only!, Producers: Roger Alan Gindi, Stewart F. Lane & Bonnie Comley, Dan Whitten, Herbert Goldsmith Productions, Ken Grossman, Bob & Rhonda Silver, Michael A. Jenkins/Dallas Summer Musicals, Inc., Wetrock Entertainment
- Kiki & Herb Alive on Broadway, Producers: David J. Foster, Jared Geller, Ruth Hendel, Jonathan Reinis, Inc., Billy Zavelson, Jamie Cesa, Anne Strickland Squadron, Jennifer Manocherian, Gary Allen, Melvin Honowitz

Regional Theatre Tony Award

- Alliance Theatre Company, Atlanta, Georgia

Lifetime Achievement in the Theatre

- Not awarded

== Multiple nominations and awards ==
These productions had multiple nominations:

- 11 nominations: Spring Awakening
- 10 nominations: The Coast of Utopia & Grey Gardens
- 8 nominations: Curtains
- 7 nominations: Legally Blonde & Mary Poppins
- 6 nominations: Coram Boy & Journey's End
- 5 nominations: 110 in the Shade
- 4 nominations: Inherit the Wind, LoveMusik & Radio Golf
- 3 nominations: Company & Frost/Nixon
- 2 nominations: A Chorus Line, Heartbreak House, The Little Dog Laughed & Talk Radio

The following productions received multiple awards.

- 8 wins: Spring Awakening
- 7 wins: The Coast of Utopia
- 3 wins: Grey Gardens

== See also ==
- Drama Desk Awards
- 2007 Laurence Olivier Awards – equivalent awards for West End theatre productions
- Obie Award
- New York Drama Critics' Circle
- Theatre World Award
- Lucille Lortel Awards
