= Mike Hodges =

British film director and screenwriter (1932–2022)

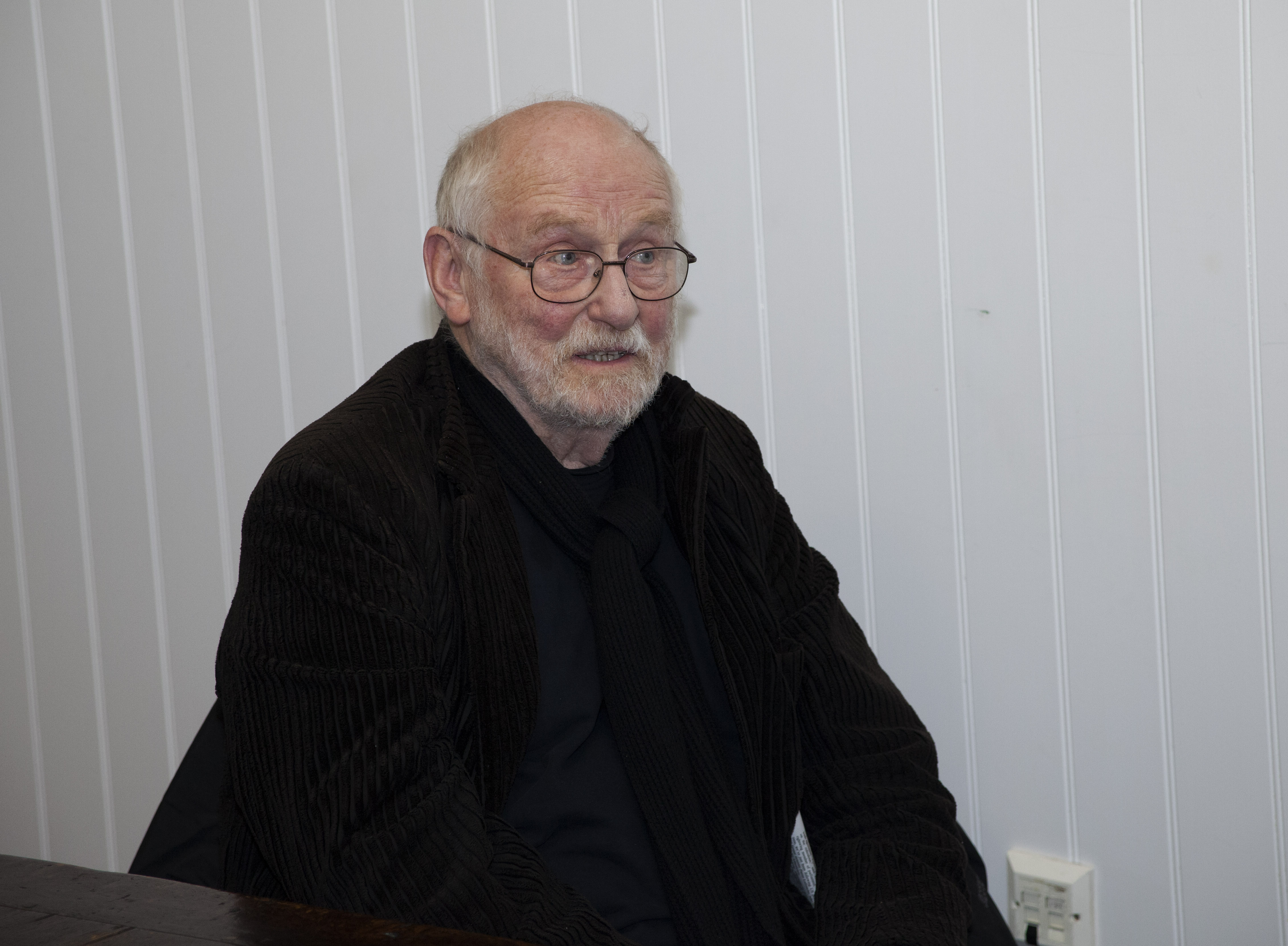
- Hodges in 2015
- Born: Michael Tommy Hodges; 29 July 1932; Bristol, England
- Died: 17 December 2022 (aged 90); Blandford Forum, Dorset, England
- Occupations: Director; screenwriter; novelist; playwright
- Years active: 1968–2003
- Spouses: Jean Alexandrov (m. 1962; div. 1984); Carol Laws (m. 2004)
- Children: 2

Michael Tommy Hodges (29 July 1932 – 17 December 2022) was an English film and television director, screenwriter, playwright and novelist. After varied work on television, he made his feature film directing debut with the crime thriller Get Carter (1971), which was a critical and commercial success and was voted one of the BFI Top 100 British films.

His subsequent works included the comic thriller Pulp (1972), the sci-fi horror film The Terminal Man (1974), the superhero film Flash Gordon (1980), and the neo-noir Croupier (1998). The British Film Institute described him as an "outsider auteur" and "a rule-breaking master given to deconstructing genre," while Andrew Sarris called him "one of the most under-appreciated and virtually unknown masters of the medium in the last 30 years."

== Early life ==
Hodges was born in Bristol on 29 July 1932, and was raised in Salisbury and Bath. He qualified as a chartered accountant and spent two years of national service on the lower deck of a Royal Navy minesweeper.

== Career ==
Hodges found a job in British television as a teleprompter operator. The job allowed him to observe the workings of the studios, and gave him time to start writing scripts. One of these scripts was Some Will Cry Murder, written for the ABC Television series Armchair Theatre. Although never performed, it served to get him enough writing commissions to quit his job as a technician.

After that, Hodges quickly progressed to producer/director status, with series such as Sunday Break for ABC, World in Action for Granada Television and the arts programmes Tempo and New Tempo for Thames Television. He wrote, directed and produced two filmed thrillers, Suspect (1969) and Rumour (1970), again for Thames Television. These films formed the basis for the creation of Euston Films, the influential television production company that continued into the 1980s. These two films also led to Hodges being asked to write and direct Get Carter (1971), which has been described as "one of the great British gangster films of all time." Hodges worked with Carter star Michael Caine again in Pulp (1972), before proceeding to make films such as the Michael Crichton adaptation The Terminal Man (1974) and the space opera Flash Gordon (1980). Some of Hodges' later films include A Prayer for the Dying (1987), Croupier (1998) and I'll Sleep When I'm Dead (2003).

Interspersed with Hodges's cinema work are some critically successful television films, including The Manipulators (1973), Squaring The Circle (1984; scripted by Tom Stoppard), Dandelion Dead (1994; scripted by Michael Chaplin), and The Healer (1994; scripted by G. F. Newman). Hodges also collaborated on the English language version of Federico Fellini's And the Ship Sails On (1983).

Hodges wrote and narrated the biographical documentary All At Sea, which was in post production in 2022.

== Theatre and radio ==
Hodges's theatre plays included Soft Shoe Shuffle (1985) and Shooting Stars and Other Heavenly Pursuits (2000), which was adapted for BBC radio. Other radio plays included King Trash (2004). His first novel, Watching The Wheels Come Off, was published first in French by Rivagse/Noir (Quand Tout Se Fait La Malle) in 2009 then in English in 2010. In 2018 his trio of novellas ('Bait', 'Grist' & 'Security') was published by Unbound.

== Personal life and death ==
Hodges was married twice. His first marriage was to Jean Alexandrov; they had two sons and later divorced. He then married Carol Laws.

Hodges died from heart failure at his home in Blandford Forum, Dorset, on 17 December 2022, aged 90.

== Recognition ==
Hodges was awarded the degree of 'Doctor of Letters' by the University of the West of England, Bristol in 2005.

== Selected filmography ==
=== Feature films ===
Year	Title	Director	Writer	Notes
1971	Get Carter	Yes	Yes	
1972	Pulp	Yes	Yes	
1974	The Terminal Man	Yes	Yes	also producer
1978	Damien – Omen II	No	Yes	
1980	Flash Gordon	Yes	No	
1985	Morons from Outer Space	Yes	No	
1987	A Prayer for the Dying	Yes	No	
1989	Black Rainbow	Yes	Yes	
1998	Croupier	Yes	No	
2003	I'll Sleep When I'm Dead	Yes	No	

=== Television ===
Year	Title	Notes
1964	World in Action	3 episodes
1968	The Tyrant King	Miniseries
1969-1970	ITV Playhouse	2 episodes
1984	Squaring the Circle	TV film
1985	The Hitchhiker	Episode: "W.G.O.D."
1986	Florida Straits	TV film
1994	Dandelion Dead	Miniseries

=== Music Videos ===
Year	Song	Artist
1980	"Flash"	Queen
1982	"Body Language"	Queen
