= Jack O'Brien (director) =

American director

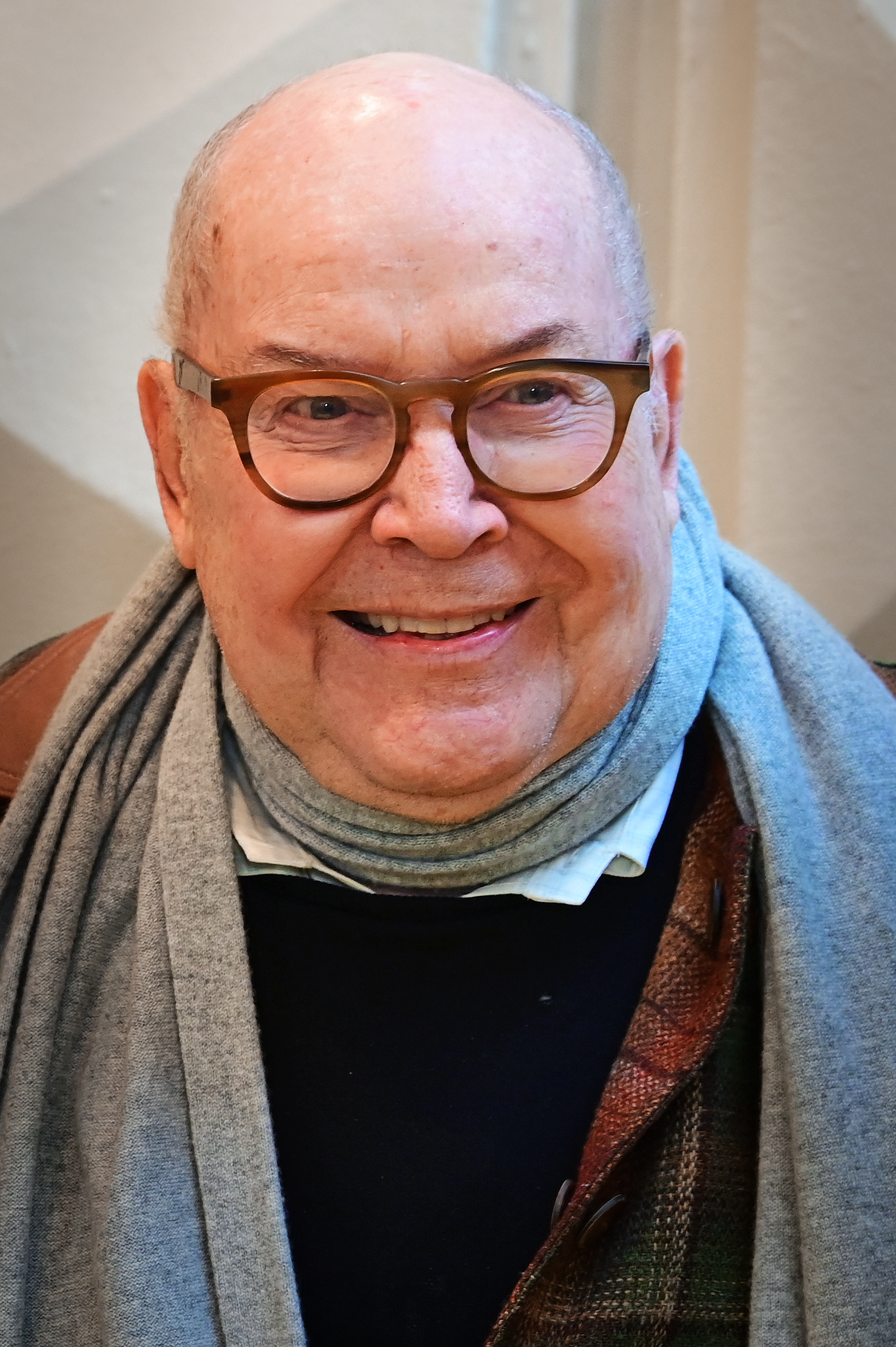
- O'Brien in 2026
- Born: June 18, 1939 (age 87); Saginaw, Michigan, U.S.
- Education: University of Michigan
- Occupations: Director, producer, writer and lyricist
- Years active: 1965–present

Jack O'Brien (born June 18, 1939) is an American director, producer, writer and lyricist. He served as the Artistic Director of the Old Globe Theatre in San Diego, California from 1981 through the end of 2007.

O'Brien has won three Tony Awards from eleven nominations and won five Drama Desk Awards. He has directed and produced musicals, including The Full Monty and Hairspray, contemporary dramas such as The Piano Lesson, The Invention of Love and The Coast of Utopia, Shakespeare classics, including Hamlet and Henry IV (a combination of Part 1 and Part 2), and operas, including Il trittico at the Metropolitan Opera.

== Biography ==
O'Brien was born in Saginaw, Michigan and attended the University of Michigan (M.A. 1962) where he was a member of Delta Tau Delta International Fraternity. He began on Broadway at the Lyceum Theatre as assistant director of revivals of You Can't Take It with You (1965–67) and The Cherry Orchard (1968), and in a number of other shows, also sometimes contributing additional lyrics to songs. He began directing at the Old Globe Theatre in San Diego, California with Shakespeare's The Comedy of Errors in 1969.

=== Early career ===
O'Brien first took the director's chair on Broadway for a revival of Cock-A-Doodle Dandy in 1969. O'Brien wrote the book and lyrics for the short-lived (five performances) The Selling of the President (1972). He returned to directing for a revival of The Time of Your Life in 1975 and a revival of Porgy and Bess in 1977, for which he received his first Tony nomination. In the meantime, he directed dozens of Shakespeare plays and other works at the Old Globe, the Lowell Davies Festival Theatre, off-Broadway and elsewhere. In New York, he next directed revivals of The Most Happy Fella (1979) on Broadway and Porgy and Bess (Radio City Music Hall, 1983).

=== Old Globe Theatre ===
After becoming Artistic Director of the Old Globe Theatre in 1981, O'Brien continued directing productions there, including a revival of Thornton Wilder's The Skin of Our Teeth, which was televised live to open the 1983 season of PBS's American Playhouse series, and the world premieres of Stephen Metcalfe's Emily (1986) and A. R. Gurney's The Cocktail Hour (1988).

As Artistic Director of the Old Globe, O'Brien co-produced Stephen Sondheim's Into the Woods (1987–89), Rumors (1988–90) and the drama The Piano Lesson (1990–91), for which he won his first Drama Desk Award. Returning to directing, O'Brien helmed Two Shakespearean Actors (1992). He co-produced Two Trains Running (1992) and Redwood Curtain (1993). He also directed and produced a revival of Damn Yankees (1994–95), Hapgood (1995, winning the Lucille Lortel Award for Direction), a flop called Getting Away With Murder (1996), and produced Play On! (1997). He next directed a revival of The Little Foxes (1997), a new comedy, More to Love (1998), which closed in three days, and produced Getting and Spending (1998). O'Brien also has occasionally directed for television over the years.

O'Brien had a hit with The Full Monty, which he directed and produced (2000–2002), and critical success with the drama The Invention of Love (2001) for which he won the Drama Desk Award for direction. In 2002, he directed the world premiere of the Nora Ephron play Imaginary Friends, which then transferred to Broadway. That same year he directed Hairspray, which ran on Broadway until January 2009. This marked his first Tony Award win, and he also received another Drama Desk Award. In 2002, he was honored with the prestigious "Mr. Abbott" Award from the Stage Directors and Choreographers Foundation. On Broadway, he next produced two more Old Globe productions, Imaginary Friends (2002–03), which he directed, and the one-performance flop, Oldest Living Confederate Widow Tells All (2003), which he did not. He returned to Shakespeare, directing Henry IV (2003–04), for which he won both the Tony and the Drama Desk Awards, and progressed from the sublime to the ridiculous, directing and producing Dirty Rotten Scoundrels (2005–06). He then produced other works including the Old Globe's annual musical adaptation of Dr. Seuss' How the Grinch Stole Christmas! (Christmas 2006–07 and 2007–08).

O'Brien next directed Tom Stoppard's trilogy of plays The Coast of Utopia (2006–07) at Lincoln Center in New York City, winning both the Tony and Drama Desk Awards. He then directed Giacomo Puccini's trilogy of operas Il trittico for the Metropolitan Opera. Other opera productions have included Peter Maxwell Davies' The Lighthouse for San Diego Opera, Mozart's The Magic Flute for the San Francisco Opera, Verdi's Aida for Houston Grand Opera, Kurt Weill's Street Scene for New York City Opera, which was televised on Live from Lincoln Center, and Puccini's Tosca for Santa Fe Opera. On television, O'Brien has directed six movies for American Playhouse, including An Enemy of the People, I Never Sang for My Father, All My Sons, and Painting Churches. His Broadway revival of Most Happy Fella and staging of The Good Doctor were produced for PBS.

O'Brien's latest directoral efforts at the Old Globe included Shakespeare's Twelfth Night, Chekhov's The Seagull, in a new version by Stoppard, and Brendan Behan's The Hostage. In stepping down as Artistic Director of the Old Globe Theatre at the end of 2007, O'Brien said, "'I consider myself truly blessed to have been able to enjoy such a full and varied career at the Globe. I have had the enviable opportunity to direct everything from Shakespeare to new American works to Broadway-bound musicals, all under the supportive and watchful eye of an enthusiastic San Diego community.'"

=== Recent and planned projects ===
He was expected to be the director of a new stage musical on Harry Houdini, produced by Scott Sanders and David Rockwell with the music being composed by Stephen Schwartz. Original star Hugh Jackman dropped out of the project in December 2013. Plans for a reading in December 2013 with out-of-town tryouts and then a Broadway premiere were presumably on hold; the musical had aimed for the 2015–16 Broadway season.

He directed several workshops of the musical adaptation of Catch Me If You Can, working together with Jerry Mitchell, who has choreographed many of O'Brien's musicals. The Broadway production opened in April 2011.

He also directed Andrew Lloyd Webber's sequel to The Phantom of the Opera, Love Never Dies, which opened in London on March 9, 2010.

In 2009, he directed the premiere of the Michael Jacobs play Impressionism at the Schoenfeld Theatre, starring Jeremy Irons and Joan Allen. He served as the director for the 2015–16 North American tour of The Sound of Music. O'Brien directed the Broadway production of Charlie and the Chocolate Factory, which opened on Broadway in 2017.

He directed the 2021 West End revival of Hairspray, staged at the London Coliseum for a limited 12-week run, which saw O'Brien reunited with Jerry Mitchell, the original choreographer returning for this production. The new production also saw Michael Ball reprise his Olivier Award winning performance as Edna Turnblad.

He published Jack in the Box: or, How to Goddamn Direct, a 2022 handbook based on his directing experiences.

O'Brien directed The Roommate by Jen Silverman on Broadway, starring Patti LuPone and Mia Farrow at the Booth Theatre in fall 2024.

He made his screen acting debut in the 2026 season of the HBO series The Comeback.

== Awards and nominations ==
Awards

- 1990 Drama Desk Award for Outstanding New Play – The Piano Lesson
- 2001 Drama Desk Award for Outstanding Director of a Play – The Invention of Love
- 2003 Drama Desk Award for Outstanding Director of a Musical – Hairspray
- 2003 Tony Award for Best Direction of a Musical – Hairspray
- 2004 Drama Desk Award for Outstanding Director of a Play – Henry IV
- 2004 Tony Award for Best Direction of a Play – Henry IV
- 2007 Tony Award for Best Direction of a Play – The Coast of Utopia
- 2007 Drama Desk Award for Outstanding Director of a Play – The Coast of Utopia
- 2007 Induction into the American Theater Hall of Fame
- 2024 Special Tony Award for Lifetime Achievement in the Theatre

Nominations

- 1977 Drama Desk Award for Outstanding Director of a Musical – Porgy and Bess
- 1977 Tony Award for Best Direction of a Musical – Porgy and Bess
- 1989 Drama Desk Award for Outstanding Director of a Play – The Cocktail Hour
- 1990 Tony Award for Best Play – The Piano Lesson
- 1992 Tony Award for Best Direction of a Play – Two Shakespearean Actors
- 1992 Tony Award for Best Play – Two Trains Running
- 2001 Drama Desk Award for Outstanding Director of a Musical – The Full Monty
- 2001 Tony Award for Best Direction of a Musical – The Full Monty
- 2001 Tony Award for Best Direction of a Play – The Invention of Love
- 2005 Tony Award for Best Direction of a Musical – Dirty Rotten Scoundrels
- 2018 Drama Desk Award for Outstanding Director of a Musical – Carousel
- 2023 Tony Award for Best Direction of a Musical – Shucked
- 2023 Drama Desk Award for Outstanding Director of a Musical – Shucked
