= Professional Foul =

Televised play written by Tom Stoppard

- Genre: Television play
- Written by: Tom Stoppard
- Directed by: Michael Lindsay-Hogg
- Starring: Peter Barkworth, John Shrapnel
- Country of origin: United Kingdom
- Original language: English

Production
- Producer: Mark Shivas
- Camera setup: multi-camera video/ film inserts
- Production company: BBC

Original release
- Network: BBC 2
- Release: 21 September 1977

Professional Foul is a television play written by Czech-born British playwright Tom Stoppard. It was broadcast on 21 September 1977 in BBC 2's Play of the Week series.

The play is set in Prague and follows the character of Professor Anderson, a Cambridge ethics don, on a weekend visit to a philosophical colloquium. What should be a fairly uneventful trip is complicated by the intervention of the Communist government, leading to an ethical dilemma for the professor of philosophy, a situation explored by Stoppard through the opinions of several characters.

The play was written to coincide with Amnesty International's "Prisoners of Conscience Year" and is dedicated to Czech playwright Václav Havel, then periodically imprisoned by the Czech Communist authorities. Stoppard has cited Havel as an influence on his writing. In the year of publication and broadcast the Charter 77 movement in Czechoslovakia presented the government with a formal protest against its violations of the Helsinki Accords. Czechoslovak dissidents watched the play on smuggled recordings and cited it as an emblem of cultural solidarity. Havel would go on to be the President of Czechoslovakia and of the Czech Republic.

Owing to its television broadcast and Stoppard's desire to convey his anti-totalitarian message to the largest audience possible, Professional Foul is less structurally and linguistically complex than some of his other works, though various examples of wordplay and philosophical language appear in the play. Stoppard would return to the theme of resistance against the Communist Party of Czechoslovakia in the plays Dogg's Hamlet, Cahoot's Macbeth and Rock 'n' Roll.

Through the piece's 16 scenes, the action almost exclusively revolves around Anderson with only one brief scene not involving the character, a marked change of emphasis from Stoppard's earlier works.

The play was published by Faber & Faber with another of Stoppard's plays, Every Good Boy Deserves Favour in 1977.

Stoppard adapted Professional Foul for BBC Radio 4, which was broadcast on 11 June 1979, starring Peter Barkworth and John Shrapnel and other members of the original BBC TV play.

== Summary ==
Anderson, a Cambridge don and professor of philosophy, is on a flight to a philosophical colloquium in Prague. McKendrick, another professor of Philosophy headed towards the colloquium who is sitting near him, forces conversation upon the reluctant and detached Anderson. During their conversation in the opening scene, the themes of politics and philosophy are established as being central to the play.

In the hotel lobby in Prague, Anderson is introduced to another philosopher, Chetwyn, and spots two English footballers, Crisp and Broadbent, who are there for a World Cup qualifying match against Czechoslovakia.

Whilst in his room, Hollar, a former student of Anderson's, comes to the door and asks Anderson to smuggle an essay out of the country which claims that the ethics of the individual should be the basis of the ethics of the state, an ideal contradicted by the Czechoslovak Communist model. Although he objects to smuggling the thesis out of the country on the grounds of "good manners" and a breach of the implied contract between himself and the Czechoslovak government, Anderson agrees to drop the thesis at Hollar's flat the next day, rather than allow Hollar to run the risk of being caught with dissident material by the police.

The next morning sees an encounter between Anderson and the two footballers, Crisp and Broadbent. The conversation reveals Anderson's ulterior motive for coming to Czechoslovakia and his lack of interest in philosophical discussion: he is there to watch the football. It is in this scene that McKendrick mistakes the two footballers for philosophers.

In the next scene, Anderson and McKendrick talk to each other about the football match with the thesis of linguistic philosopher Professor Stone as a backdrop. The limitations of linguistic philosophy are indicated here, as well as Anderson's ability to think on his feet.

Anderson leaves the colloquium session early to return Hollar's thesis to him before heading to the football match. However, when Anderson arrives there, he is accosted by several police officers who prevent him from leaving the Hollar flat. The Professor finds that he has been appointed witness by Hollar's wife (who cannot speak English) as the flat is in the process of being searched. It is revealed that on his way from the hotel back to his home, Pavel Hollar was arrested. At this point Anderson is now late for the football match, so the police permit him to listen to the match on the radio. The action from the football match parallels events in the flat: Broadbent commits a professional foul on a Czechoslovak footballer just as the police commit their own professional foul by planting foreign currency in the Hollar residence to justify their arrest of an outspoken critic of the government.

Eventually permitted to leave, the exhausted Anderson returns to the hotel where he overhears match reports being read by two different English journalists. At dinner that evening, McKendrick introduces the idea of "catastrophe theory," as well as inadvertently providing a philosophical criticism of the actions of Anderson, angering the protagonist. It is learnt here that Chetwyn, like Anderson, had an ulterior motive for travel to Czechoslovakia. Mrs Hollar then comes to the hotel and Anderson departs the dinner conversation to talk with her.

In the street, Sacha, Pavel Hollar's young son explains what is happening in broken English. On observation of the emotional plight of the two, Anderson vows to do all he can to help.

Anderson spends the evening thinking about his situation, eventually going to borrow Grayson's typewriter where he interrupts a drunken McKendrick lecturing an unimpressed crowd, including the footballers. McKendrick's criticisms of Broadbent's actions in the football match lead the footballer to punch McKendrick, knocking him out.

At the colloquium the next day, Anderson delivers a lecture which he wrote the evening before. The paper is not the one which he had earlier agreed to present but one which speaks of the conflicts between the rights of individuals and the rights of the community, an allusion to his experiences in Czechoslovakia with Hollar. The colloquium's chairman stops the potentially damaging criticism by staging a false fire alarm.

In the play's penultimate scene, Anderson and Chetwyn's luggage is meticulously searched by officials whilst McKendrick breezes through. Nothing is found on Anderson, leading to questions surrounding the whereabouts of Hollar's thesis, however Chetwyn is found to be smuggling letters to Amnesty International and is detained.

The final scene is similar to the way in which the play began. On the plane Anderson and McKendrick discuss the fate of Chetwyn and the events of the weekend. It is then revealed by Anderson that he took advantage of McKendrick's "Catastrophe Theory" by placing Hollar's thesis in McKendrick's bag whilst he was unconscious. In spite of McKendrick's role in Anderson's decision to commit his own professional foul, McKendrick is furious. Anderson concedes that McKendrick's anger is justified, but concludes by saying that ethical philosophy can be very complicated.

== Cast ==
- Director: Michael Lindsay-Hogg
- Writer: Tom Stoppard
- Anderson: Peter Barkworth
- McKendrick: John Shrapnel
- Pavel Hollar: Stephen Rea
- Chetwyn: Richard O'Callaghan
- Sacha Hollar: Stefan Ceba
- Captain: David de Keyser
- Frenchman: Graeme Eton
- Interpreter: Sandra Frieze
- Broadbent: Bernard Hill
- Crisp: Billy Hamon
- Chairman: Ivan Jelínek
- Grayson: Sam Kelly
- Policeman 2: Milos Kirek
- Policeman 3: Arnošt Kopecký (without diacritics in the closing credits; some published texts give the name as Arnoft, a clear typo)
- Policeman 1: Ludwig Lang
- Chamberlain: Victor Longley
- Clerk: Patrick Monckton
- Policeman 4: Paul Moritz
- Stone: Shane Rimmer
- Mrs Hollar: Susan Strawson

== Quotes ==
- Anderson: I wouldn't be nervous about flying if the wings didn't wag. Solid steel. Thick as a bank safe. Flexing like tree branches. It's not natural.
- [About the victory of the Czechoslovak football team] Grayson: There'll be Czechs bouncing in the streets of Prague tonight.
- McKendrick: You eat well, but you're a lousy eater.
- Chetwyn: I have friends here, that's all.
- Broadbent: They don't teach you nothing at that place then.
- Anderson: There is a sense of right and wrong which precedes utterance. It is individually experienced and it concerns one person's dealings with another person. From this experience we have built a system of ethics which is the sum of individual acts of recognition of individual right.
- McKendrick: You bastard. You utter bastard.

== Bibliography ==
- Stoppard, Tom (1977). Every Good Boy Deserves Favour & Professional Foul. London: Faber. ISBN 0-8021-5045-4.
