= Hapgood (play) =

1988 play by Sir Tom Stoppard

- Written by: Tom Stoppard
- Characters: Hapgood; Blair; Kerner; Ridley; Wates; Merryweather; Maggs; Joe; Russian
- Original language: English
- Subject: Espionage, quantum mechanics

Premiere
- Date premiered: March 8, 1988
- Place premiered: Aldwych Theatre, London

Hapgood is a play by Tom Stoppard, first produced in 1988. It is mainly about espionage, focusing on a British female spymaster (Hapgood) and her juggling of career and motherhood. The play also makes reference to quantum mechanics, including Niels Bohr's "The answer is the question interrogated"; Heisenberg's uncertainty principle; and the topological problem of the Seven Bridges of Königsberg. The critic Michael Billington wrote, “I enjoyed Hapgood (1988) the first time around but it is now counted as one of his rare failures.”

== Productions ==
In the original production in 1988, directed by Peter Wood, Felicity Kendal played Hapgood, Nigel Hawthorne played her friend and superior Blair and Roger Rees was their agent, the Soviet scientist Kerner. The production “received rude and confused reviews,” and it was revised significantly in 1994 for the first New York production.

The play premiered in the US Off-Broadway at the Lincoln Center Mitzi E. Newhouse Theater on 11 November 1994 and closed on 26 March 1995. Directed by Jack O'Brien, the cast featured Josef Sommer (Blair), David Strathairn (Kerner) and Stockard Channing (Hapgood). Jack O'Brien won the 1995 Lucille Lortel Award for Outstanding Director.
