= Penelope (monodrama) =

2019 composition

- by André Previn realized by David Fetherolf to a libretto by Tom Stoppard
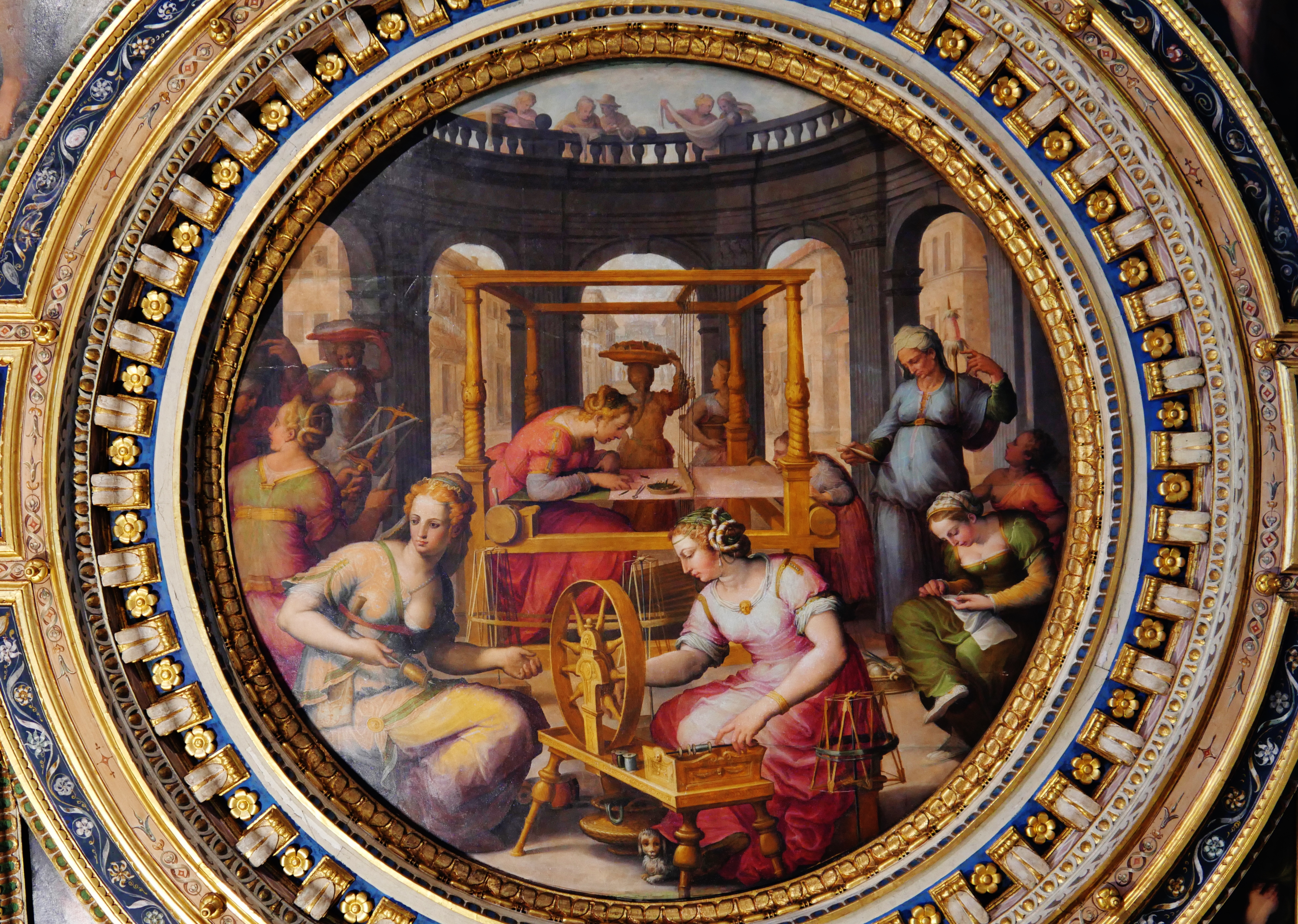
- Penelope at her loom, detail, ceiling soffit, Sala di Penelope, Quartiere di Eleonora, Palazzo Vecchio, by Giorgio Vasari and Giovanni Stradano, 1561–2
- Commissioned by: Boston Symphony Orchestra, Ravinia Festival, Aspen Music Festival and School, John F. Kennedy Center
- Text: Tom Stoppard
- Dedication: Renée Fleming
- Publisher: G. Schirmer, Inc., Faber & Faber
- Duration: c. 38 minutes
- Scoring: Piano, 2 violins, viola, cello

Premiere
- Date: 24 July 2019
- Location: Tanglewood (by Renée Fleming, Emerson String Quartet, Simone Dinnerstein, Uma Thurman)

Penelope is a 2019 musical monodrama or chamber opera for soprano and female narrator by conductor-composer André Previn, completed after his death by David Fetherolf, to a libretto by Tom Stoppard, and inspired by the character of Penelope from the Odyssey. Scored for piano and string quartet, it was first performed at the Tanglewood Music Festival in July 2019, by soprano Renée Fleming, narrator Uma Thurman, pianist Simone Dinnerstein, and the Emerson String Quartet.

== See also ==
- List of compositions by André Previn
