= Lord Malquist and Mr Moon =

1966 novel by Tom Stoppard

Lord Malquist and Mr Moon is a 1966 novel by British playwright Tom Stoppard. His only novel, its title characters are an impoverished dandy (Malquist) and his manservant (Moon).

In the 1970s Ned Sherrin of Virgin Films attempted unsuccessfully to turn the book into a film.
