= Enter a Free Man =

1968 play by Tom Stoppard

Enter a Free Man is a play by Tom Stoppard that follows the story of an unsuccessful inventor named George Riley. The play was first performed on March 28, 1968, at the St. Martin's Theatre. It was directed by Frith Banbury and starred Michael Hordern.

It consists largely of material from his 1960 play A Walk on Water. When being interviewed by Giles Gordon in 1968, Stoppard said of Enter a Free Man, "I have worked on it a bit over the last year. In fact I wrote a new scene for it about 3 weeks ago while it was on tour, but it is basically the play I wrote in 1960. I mean it is still a play about the same people in the same situation. There is some new stuff in it and I have thrown out certain things. There was some imagery which went bad on me as things do, I suppose about a third of it has been written in at various times over the last few years." Despite this, Enter a Free Man has sometimes been described as Stoppard's first play.

== Plot ==
George is determined to follow his unrealistic dreams, despite the fact that his behavior becomes a problem for his wife Persephone and his daughter Linda. He even has to borrow money from his daughter, money which he spends at the local pub. George believes he has found a great new idea in reusable envelopes, but of course his plans do not come to fruition. He continues to put his family under pressure just as his daughter has begun searching for her own independence in the form of men. While George threatens to leave and Linda tries, the play concludes with everyone in the same position in which they had begun the story. Stoppard implies that perhaps this is actually, for all of its pitfalls, the best situation.

== Reception ==
Clive Barnes of The New York Times wrote in 1974, "It shows little of the flaunting, dazzling intellectualism that has subsequently become Mr. Stoppard's emblem [...] Yet there is always that wit flicking, out at the audience." Leone Lucille Michel wrote, "His ability to create fully developed characters and relationships is limited and he wisely moved away from this type of drama into his own particular type of comedy."
