= The Coast of Utopia =

Trilogy of plays

- Original language: English
- Written by: Tom Stoppard
- Characters: Alexander Herzen; Vissarion Belinsky; Ivan Turgenev; Mikhail Bakunin
- Series: The Coast of Utopia: Voyage; Shipwreck; Salvage
- Genre: Drama
- Setting: pre-revolution Russia

Premiere
- Date: 22 June 2002
- Place: Olivier Theatre; London, England

The Coast of Utopia is a 2002 trilogy of plays: Voyage, Shipwreck, and Salvage, written by Tom Stoppard with focus on the philosophical debates in pre-revolution Russia between 1833 and 1866. Having won the 2007 Tony Award for Best Play, it ended up becoming the most Tony-winning play of all time in this ceremony, a record it holds to this day. The title comes from a chapter in Avrahm Yarmolinsky's book Road to Revolution: A Century of Russian Radicalism (1959).

The trilogy, nine hours in total, premiered with Voyage on 22 June 2002 at the National Theatre's Olivier auditorium in repertory, directed by Trevor Nunn. The openings of Shipwreck and Salvage followed on 8 July, and 19 July, completing its run on 23 November 2002. In 2006, directed by Jack O'Brien, the plays debuted on Broadway at the Vivian Beaumont Theater at Lincoln Center, New York City, where it closed on 13 May 2007 after a combined total of 124 performances.

The trilogy has also been performed in Russia; it opened at Moscow's Russian Academic Youth Theatre in October 2007, directed by Alexey Borodin.

The trilogy received its Japanese premiere at Theater Cocoon, Bunkamura in Tokyo on 12 September 2009 and completed its run (including 10 one-day marathon performances) on 4 October 2009. The production was directed by Yukio Ninagawa.

== Production history ==
=== London premiere ===
Directed by Trevor Nunn, the trilogy premiered with Voyage at the Olivier Theatre in London on 22 June 2002, followed by Shipwreck and Salvage with a six-month run ended on 23 November 2002.

Reviewing the play in The Guardian, drama critic Michael Billington wrote, "Tom Stoppard's The Coast of Utopia in the Olivier is a bundle of contradictions. Comprising three three-hour plays, it is heroically ambitious and wildly uneven. ... But I wouldn't have missed it for worlds and at its heart it contains a fascinating lesson about the nature of drama." He further commented on Stoppard the dramatist, "I think it is time we began to appreciate Stoppard not for his intellectual legerdemain, but for what he is actually best at: exploring the mystery of existence, the anguish of the human heart and the strange fact that it is our apprehension of death that gives joy and intensity to life."

=== Broadway debut ===
The trilogy's Broadway debut was directed by Jack O'Brien at the Vivian Beaumont Theater in New York City. The cast included Brían F. O'Byrne, Richard Easton, Jennifer Ehle, Billy Crudup, Ethan Hawke, Josh Hamilton, Martha Plimpton, David Harbour, Jason Butler Harner, and Amy Irving. Viewed as "the season's ultimate snob ticket", the production ran from November 2006 to May 2007 with a combined total of 124 performances.

In his review for The New York Times, Ben Brantley called the production "brave and gorgeous", adding that "I wouldn't call it [the play] a major work of art. In literary terms I wouldn't even rank it with Mr. Stoppard's best (in which I include the Broadway-bound Rock 'n' Roll). But as directed by Jack O'Brien and acted and designed by a stellar team of artisans, Utopia is a major work of theatrical craftsmanship, a luscious advertisement for the singular narrative seductiveness of drama."

The production was nominated for 10 Tony Awards and won seven, breaking the Tony record for the most awards given to a play.

== Characters and cast ==
The following table indicates the roles played by the main cast in London, New York, and Moscow, respectively. Several principal actors played multiple roles in each of the three plays.

Role in Voyage	Role in Shipwreck	Role in Salvage	Actor in London, 2002	Actor in New York, 2006	Actor in Moscow, 2007
Alexander Herzen			Stephen Dillane	Brían F. O'Byrne	Ilya Isaev
Liubov Bakunin	Natalie Herzen	Malwida von Meysenbug	Eve Best	Jennifer Ehle	Nelly Uvarova
Vissarion Belinsky		n/a	Will Keen	Billy Crudup	Evgeny Redko
Ivan Turgenev			Guy Henry	Jason Butler Harner	Alexey Miasnikov
Mikhail Bakunin			Douglas Henshall	Ethan Hawke	Stepan Morozov
Alexander Bakunin	Leonty Ibayev	Stanislaw Worcell	John Carlisle	Richard Easton	Viktor Tsymbal
Varenka Bakunin	Natasha Tuchkova	Natasha Tuchkova Ogareva	Charlotte Emmerson	Martha Plimpton	Ramilya Iskander

== Historical figures ==
The play is well known for including a cast of more than 70 characters, many based on historical figures of the period.

Major Characters

- Mikhail Bakunin
- Vissarion Belinsky
- Alexander Herzen
- Nikolay Ogarev
- Ivan Turgenev

Minor Characters

- Konstantin Aksakov
- Louis Blanc
- Pyotr Chaadayev
- Nikolay Chernyshevsky
- Timofey Granovsky
- Georg Herwegh
- Ernest Charles Jones
- Gottfried Kinkel
- Lajos Kossuth
- Alexandre Auguste Ledru-Rollin
- Karl Marx
- Giuseppe Mazzini
- Nikolai Polevoy
- Alexander Pushkin
- Arnold Ruge
- Stepan Shevyryov
- Nikolai Stankevich
- Malwida von Meysenbug
- Stanisław Gabriel Worcell

== Awards and nominations ==
=== 2002 National Theatre Olivier production ===
Year	Award	Category	Nominee	Result
2003	Laurence Olivier Awards	Best New Play	Tom Stoppard	Nominated
2003	Laurence Olivier Awards	Best Set Design	William Dudley	Nominated
2003	Laurence Olivier Awards	Best Costume Design	William Dudley	Nominated
2003	Laurence Olivier Awards	Best Lighting Design	David Hersey	Nominated

=== 2006–2007 Broadway production ===
Year	Award	Category	Nominee	Result
2007	Tony Awards	Best Play	Tom Stoppard	Won
2007	Tony Awards	Best Direction of a Play	Jack O'Brien	Won
2007	Tony Awards	Best Leading Actor in a Play	Brian F. O'Byrne	Nominated
2007	Tony Awards	Best Featured Actor in a Play	Billy Crudup	Won
2007	Tony Awards	Best Featured Actor in a Play	Ethan Hawke	Nominated
2007	Tony Awards	Best Featured Actress in a Play	Jennifer Ehle	Won
2007	Tony Awards	Best Featured Actress in a Play	Martha Plimpton	Nominated
2007	Tony Awards	Best Scenic Design of a Play	Bob Crowley and Scott Pask	Won
2007	Tony Awards	Best Costume Design of a Play	Catherine Zuber	Won
2007	Tony Awards	Best Lighting Design of a Play	Brian MacDevitt, Kenneth Posner, and Natasha Katz	Won
2007	Drama Desk Awards	Outstanding Play		Won
2007	Drama Desk Awards	Outstanding Director of a Play	Jack O'Brien	Won
2007	Drama Desk Awards	Outstanding Actor in a Play	Brian F. O'Byrne	Nominated
2007	Drama Desk Awards	Outstanding Featured Actor in a Play	Billy Crudup	Nominated
2007	Drama Desk Awards	Outstanding Featured Actress in a Play	Martha Plimpton	Won
2007	Drama Desk Awards	Outstanding Music for a Play	Mark Bennett	Won
2007	Drama Desk Awards	Outstanding Set Design of a Play	Bob Crowley and Scott Pask	Won
2007	Drama Desk Awards	Outstanding Costume Design	Catherine Zuber	Won
2007	Drama Desk Awards	Outstanding Lighting Design	Kenneth Posner, Brian MacDevitt, and Natasha Katz	Won
2007	Drama Desk Awards	Outstanding Sound Design	Mark Bennett	Nominated
2007	Drama League Awards	Distinguished Production of a Play		Won
2007	Drama League Awards	Distinguished Performance	Billy Crudup	Nominated
2007	Drama League Awards	Distinguished Performance	Ethan Hawke	Nominated
2007	Drama League Awards	Distinguished Performance	Brian F. O’Byrne	Nominated
2007	New York Drama Critics Circle Awards	Best Play	Tom Stoppard	Won
2007	Outer Critics Circle Awards	Outstanding New Broadway Play		Won
2007	Outer Critics Circle Awards	Outstanding Director of a Play	Jack O'Brien	Won
2007	Outer Critics Circle Awards	Outstanding Actor in a Play	Brian F. O'Byrne	Nominated
2007	Outer Critics Circle Awards	Outstanding Actress in a Play	Jennifer Ehle	Nominated
2007	Outer Critics Circle Awards	Outstanding Featured Actor in a Play	Billy Crudup	Nominated
2007	Outer Critics Circle Awards	Outstanding Featured Actress in a Play	Martha Plimpton	Won
2007	Outer Critics Circle Awards	Outstanding Set Design	Bob Crowley and Scott Pask	Won
2007	Outer Critics Circle Awards	Outstanding Costume Design	Catherine Zuber	Won
2007	Outer Critics Circle Awards	Outstanding Lighting Design	Brian MacDevitt, Kenneth Posner, and Natasha Katz	Won
