= Squaring the Circle (1984 play) =

Television play by Tom Stoppard

Squaring the Circle is a 1984 BBC television play written by Sir Tom Stoppard, directed by Mike Hodges, and starring Bernard Hill as Lech Wałęsa. It is an unreliable narrator depiction of the rise of the Polish trade union Solidarność and its suppression by the communist government under the threat of Russian invasion.

The title is an allusion to the provably unsolvable geometrical problem of squaring the circle, i.e., constructing a square with the area of a given circle by using only a finite number of steps with a compass and straightedge:

The Narrator: Between August 1980 in December 1981 an attempt was made in Poland to put together two ideas which wouldn't fit. The idea of freedom as it's understood in the west and the idea of socialism as it's understood in the Soviet Empire. The idea failed, because it was impossible. In the same sense as it's impossible in geometry to turn a circle into a square of the same area. Not because no one's found out how to do it, but because there's no way in which it can be done.

The play was conceived in 1982, but owing to a power-struggle between the BBC and the American production company Metromedia, was heavily modified and not broadcast until 1984.
