= Gérald Sibleyras =

Gérald Sibleyras is a French dramatist.

== Plays ==
2000 : Le Béret de la tortue, co-written with Jean Dell, théâtre du Splendid Saint-Martin

2002 : Un petit jeu sans conséquence, co-written avec Jean Dell, théâtre La Bruyère

2003 : Le Vent des peupliers, théâtre Montparnasse

2004 : L'Inscription, Petit Montparnasse

2005 : Une heure et demie de retard, co-written with Jean Dell, théâtre des Mathurins

2006 : Vive Bouchon !, co-written with Jean Dell, théâtre Michel

2006 : La Danse de l'albatros, théâtre Montparnasse

2008 : Le Banc, théâtre Montparnasse

2008 : Sophie Mounicot, c'est mon tour ! de Gérald Sibleyras, François Rollin et Sophie Mounicot, Petits Mathurins

2009 : Cendrillon, le spectacle musical, co-written with Étienne de Balasy, théâtre Mogador

2010 : Une comédie romantique, théâtre Montparnasse

2010 : Stand up, théâtre Tristan-Bernard

2015 : Perrichon voyage toujours, d'après Eugène Labiche, théâtre La Bruyère

2015 : Un avenir radieux, théâtre de Paris

2016 : Silence, on tourne !, co-written with Patrick Haudecoeur, théâtre Fontaine.

2017 : La Récompense, théâtre Édouard-VII.

2022 : Berlin Berlin, co-written with Patrick Haudecoeur, théâtre Fontaine.

In the English-speaking world, Sibleyras is best known for Heroes, Tom Stoppard's 2005 translation into English of Sibleyras's 2003 play, Le vent des peupliers. Heroes won the Laurence Olivier Award for Best New Comedy in 2006.

And two UK Tour of One Hour And A Half Late (Une Heure et demi de retard).

2006 with Mel Smith and Belinda Lang

2022 with Griff Rhys Jones and Janie Dee

== Adaptions ==
2007 : La Retraite de Russie (Retreat From Moscow William Nicholson) Petit Montparnasse

2008 : Les Aventures de Rabbi Jacob, with Étienne de Balasy from the movie Gérard Oury et Danièle Thompson, palais des congrès de Paris

2009 : Les 39 Marches (The 39 Steps, Alfred Hitchcock/John Buchan), théâtre La Bruyère

2012 : Pensées Secrètes de David Lodge, mise en scène Christophe Lidon, théâtre Montparnasse

2012 : Des fleurs pour Algernon, (Flower For Algernon, Daniel Keyes), théâtre des Champs-Élysées

2015 : La maison d'à côté, théâtre du Petit-Saint-Martin.

2017 : Novecento, (Alessandro Baricco), adapted with André Dussollier.

2017 : Piège Mortel, (Death Trap, Ira Levin) théâtre la Bruyère.

2017 : La Garçonnière (The Appartement, Billy Wilder). théâtre de Paris.

2017 : Abigail's Party, théâtre de Poche.

2022 : Un Visiteur inattendu, (An Unexpected Guest, Agatha Christie) co-adapted with Sylvie Perez, Artistic Théâtre.

2022 : Une Situation délicate, (Relatively Speaking, Alan Ayckbourn), Théâtre des Nouveautés.

== Prices and nominations ==
=== Nominations ===
2003 : nomination pour le molière de l'auteur pour Un petit jeu sans conséquence

2003 : nomination pour le molière de l'auteur pour Le Vent des peupliers

2003 : nomination pour le molière de la pièce de création française pour Le Vent des peupliers

2003 : nomination pour le molière du théâtre privé pour Un petit jeu sans conséquence

2003 : nomination pour le molière du théâtre privé pour Le Vent des peupliers

2004 : nomination pour le molière de l'auteur pour L'Inscription

2004 : nomination pour le molière de la pièce de création française pour L'Inscription

2005 : nomination pour le molière de l'auteur pour La Danse de l'albatros

2017 : nomination pour le molière de la meilleure comédie pour Silence, on tourne !

2017 : nomination pour le molière du meilleur spectacle théâtre privé pour La Garçonnière.

=== Prices ===
2003 : molière of Best French Creation for Un petit jeu sans conséquence

2006 : Laurence Olivier Award for Best Comedy for Heroes

2007 : Prix théâtre de la SACD

2010 : molière for the adaptation Les 39 Marches

2012 : prix de l'adaptation SACD

2022 : molière de la Comédie pour Berlin Berlin.
