= Dogg's Hamlet, Cahoot's Macbeth =

Pair of 1979 plays by Tom Stoppard

Dogg's Hamlet, Cahoot's Macbeth are two plays by Tom Stoppard, written to be performed together. This was not the first time that Stoppard had made use of Shakespearean texts in his own plays or even the first time he had used Hamlet although the context is far different from that of his earlier Rosencrantz and Guildenstern Are Dead. Stoppard would return to the theme of artistic dissent against the Communist Party of Czechoslovakia in Rock 'n' Roll.

It was performed on Broadway for 28 performances and 2 previews at the 22 Steps opening October 3, 1979 and closing October 28, 1979.

== Dogg's Hamlet ==
In Dogg's Hamlet the actors speak a language called Dogg, which consists of ordinary English words but with meanings completely different from the ones normally assigned them. Three schoolchildren are rehearsing a performance of Hamlet in English, which is to them a foreign language. Dogg's Hamlet was initially inspired by a scenario proposed by philosopher Ludwig Wittgenstein in his work Philosophical Investigations. In this illustrative passage, which plays out in the play, a builder, A, is building something using differently shaped building stones. As A calls out "slab!" "block!" "pillar!" or "beam," the appropriate stones are brought to him by his assistant, B. An observer might assume that the words name the objects, but Wittgenstein suggests another interpretation: that the co-worker already knows what pieces to toss and in what order, but that the words are rather signals that A is ready for the next piece. Wittgenstein also suggests a scenario in which one worker understands the words to mean the shapes of the wood and the other understands the words as the signification of readiness, in other words: The two workers speak different languages without being aware of this fact.

=== 15-Minute Hamlet ===
The version of Hamlet eventually performed as a play within a play is a highly abridged version including the best-known lines and scenes, amounting to approximately 13 minutes of on-stage action. This is followed by another even more drastically reduced performance of the play from beginning to end, lasting 2 minutes, bringing the total running time up to 15 minutes. This sequence has sometimes been performed as a standalone work, as The Dogg's Troupe 15-Minute Hamlet or 15-Minute Hamlet.

== Cahoot's Macbeth ==
Cahoot's Macbeth is usually performed with Dogg's Hamlet, and shows a shortened performance of Macbeth carried out under the eyes of a secret police officer who suspects the actors of subversion against the state. The piece is dedicated to the playwright Pavel Kohout whom Stoppard had met in Prague, Czechoslovakia in 1977. Because Kohout and some fellow actors had been barred from working in the theatre by the communist government due to their involvement with Charter 77, he had developed an adaptation of Macbeth to be performed in living rooms.

== Links between the two plays ==
The character of "Easy" appears in both plays. He arrives in Dogg's Hamlet to deliver the planks, slabs, blocks, and cubes necessary to build the platform, but is the only character who speaks normal English instead of Dogg, and as such no other character can understand him. When he appears in the living room audience in Cahoot's Macbeth the reverse is true: he is the only character who speaks Dogg on a stage full of normal-English speakers, and once again completely baffles characters (as the homeowner puts it, "At the moment we're not sure if it's a language or a clinical condition") until several of them, most notably Cahoot, are revealed to also speak Dogg. However, while Cahoot and others can switch between Dogg and English at will, Easy speaks Dogg exclusively until the closing line of the play.

At the end of Cahoot's Macbeth, by which time the audience has been taught numerous meanings of Dogg words, a speech from Dogg's Hamlet is repeated verbatim. In Dogg's Hamlet it was simply an absurdist, hilarious speech with no meaning, where English words were used in unexpected ways baffling to normal syntax as well as meaning. When it is repeated in Cahoot's Macbeth, under the eyes and ears of a secret policemen, we now understand it to be the voice of Resistance, subversive and in opposition to the powers-that-be. It is a thrilling demonstration of a coded language developed and used by artists in a totalitarian state, apparently innocuous, but full of meaning and inspiration to those who have learned to understand the coded language: a tribute to Kohout and others forced to live in such conditions.

== Adaptation ==
In 2005 the plays were adapted into a film by Joey Zimmerman. The shooting location was the Knightsbridge Theatre, the same theatre which put on a production of Dogg's Hamlet, Cahoot's Macbeth in 2000.
