= Ti Green =

Ti Green is a British set and costume designer for stage and film.

== Early life ==
Emma Ti Green, born on November 21st 1969, grew up in Twickenham and Kew, south-west London. She attended Queen's School, Kew, and Godolphin and Latimer, Hammersmith.

== Life ==
In 1980 she was bridesmaid to Phil Lynott and Caroline Crowther, the daughter of British comedian Leslie Crowther.

In 2007 she was the costume designer for a two act play on Broadway.

And in 2009 she had a child whom she named Dylan Price. The father being Dave Price who, in 2010, she went on to marry.
