= Heroes (play) =

- Written by: Gérald Sibleyras (original French play), translated into English and adapted by Tom Stoppard
- Subject: A Parisian boulevard comedy about three men: an idealist, a pragmatist and a fence sitter
- Genre: Comedy

Premiere
- Date premiered: 18 October 2005
- Place premiered: Wyndham's Theatre; London

Heroes is a 2005 translation into English and adaptation by Tom Stoppard of the 2003 French play Le Vent Des Peupliers by Gérald Sibleyras.

The play is a comedy set in 1959 in a French retirement home for First World War veterans. (The literal translation of Le vent des peupliers is "The Wind in the Poplars". During the adaptation into English, there was concern this might cause confusion due to being too close to the popular children's title The Wind in the Willows, so Heroes was agreed as the English title. At the time, Stoppard said, "To tell you the truth, if Charles Wood hadn't written a play called Veterans [in 1972], we would have called it that.")

The original production opened at London's Wyndham's Theatre on 18 October 2005 and closed on 14 January 2006. It starred Richard Griffiths, John Hurt and Ken Stott.

In 2007, the first American production opened at the Geffen Playhouse in Los Angeles, starring Richard Benjamin, Len Cariou, and George Segal.
