= Rock 'n' Roll (play) =

2006 play by Tom Stoppard

- Cover of the play.
- Original language: English
- Written by: Tom Stoppard
- Characters: Jan; Max; Eleanor; Esme; Interrogator; Nigel; Ferdinand; Young Esme; Alice; Gillian; Magda; Deirdre; Piper; State Security Officer 1 Stephen; Milan; State Security Officer 2 Jaroslav; Lenka; Candida
- Setting: Prague, Czechoslovakia and Cambridge, England from 1968 to 1990

Premiere
- Date: 3 June 2006
- Place: England

Rock 'n' Roll is a play by British playwright Tom Stoppard that premiered at the Royal Court Theatre, London, in 2006.

== Plot summary ==
The play is concerned with the significance of rock and roll in the emergence of the socialist movement in Eastern-Bloc Czechoslovakia between the Prague Spring of 1968 and the Velvet Revolution of 1989. Taking place in Cambridge, England and in Prague, the play contrasts the attitudes of a young Czech PhD student and rock music fan, who becomes appalled by the repressive regime in his home country, with those of his British Marxist professor, who unrepentantly continues to believe in the Soviet ideal.

The play takes place over several decades, from the late 1960s until 1990, ending with a concert given by the Rolling Stones that year in Prague. Recurrent references are made to a glimpse by one of the main characters of the young Syd Barrett performing Golden Hair. Barrett's physical and mental decline also plays a role in the drama (Barrett in fact died during the play's run). The underground Czech group the Plastic People of the Universe are held up by another character as an ideal of resistance to Communism. The poetry of Sappho is another recurrent motif; its pagan sensualism is implicitly compared with the anarchic erotic force of rock music.

One of the characters, a Czech writer, is named Ferdinand as an homage to Václav Havel. Havel wrote three plays with a protagonist named Ferdinand Vaněk, a stand-in for Havel himself. These plays were distributed by samizdat and became a symbol of the resistance. A number of Havel's friends then wrote their own Vaněk plays, with Ferdinand Vaněk as a character. Stoppard continues in that tradition.

This play is one of several works in Stoppard's oeuvre concerned with artistic dissent against the Communist Party of Czechoslovakia: Dogg's Hamlet, Cahoot's Macbeth also addresses this, as do Every Good Boy Deserves Favour and Professional Foul.

== Original production ==
The original production was staged at the Royal Court Theatre and ran from 3 June until 15 July 2006. It then transferred to the Duke of York's Theatre. The production was directed by Trevor Nunn and featured the following cast:

- Jan – Rufus Sewell
- Max – Brian Cox
- Eleanor, Esme – Sinéad Cusack
- Interrogator, Nigel – Anthony Calf
- Ferdinand – Peter Sullivan
- Young Esme, Alice – Alice Eve
- Gillian, Magda, Deirdre – Miranda Colchester
- Piper, Police Officer 1, Stephen – Edward Hogg
- Milan, Police Officer 2, Jaroslav – Martin Chamberlain
- Lenka – Nicole Ansari
- Candida – Louise Bangay

Taking over from the principal actors mid-run were:

- Jan – Dominic West
- Max – David Calder
- Eleanor, Esme – Emma Fielding
- Young Esme/ Alice – Fiona Button

The production closed on 25 February 2007 at the Duke of York's Theatre before an announced transfer to Broadway in the autumn of 2007.

The premiere of the play was attended by first president of the post-Communist Czech Republic and leading figure of the Velvet Revolution, Václav Havel (a friend of Stoppard's) and rock star Mick Jagger, whose band, The Rolling Stones, features in the final scene of the play. Jagger has worked with Stoppard previously, having produced the film Enigma, for which Stoppard wrote the screenplay, and has, along with his production company Jagged Films, "approached" Stoppard "for the movie rights" to the play Rock 'n' Roll. Also in attendance was Paul Wilson, the Canadian former lead singer of the Plastic People of the Universe, with whom Stoppard consulted while writing the play.

== Prague production ==
The play premiered in Prague's historic National Theatre (Národní Divadlo) in February 2007. It features opening and closing performances by The Plastic People of the Universe.

== Broadway production ==
A Broadway (New York City) run of the play commenced in previews on 19 October 2007 and opened on 4 November 2007 at the Bernard B. Jacobs Theatre. Several of the original cast members – including Sewell, Cox and Cusack – appeared in the production that is directed by Trevor Nunn. The production had a strictly limited run and closed on 9 March 2008.

== Other productions ==
The San Francisco production, directed by Carey Perloff, opened at the American Conservatory Theater on 17 September 2008. It then moved to Boston's Huntington Theatre Company, who co-produced the production, on 7 November.

The first UK production of the play outside London was at the Library Theatre in Manchester from 13 February to 14 March 2009.

Teatre Lliure of Barcelona presented Rock 'n' Roll, in Catalan and directed by Àlex Rigola, as the opening show for the 2008–2009 season between 18 September and 19 October.

Joy Zinoman, Founding Artistic Director of The Studio Theatre in Washington, DC, will direct the play beginning 22 April 2009.

The Alley Theatre in Houston, Texas produced Rock 'n' Roll beginning 24 April 2009, directed by Alley Theatre Artistic Director Gregory Boyd.

Goodman Theatre of Chicago hosted a production from 2 May through 7 June 2009.

The Canadian premiere was at Dawson College in Montréal Quebec in January 2009 directed by Douglas Buchanan.

The Canadian Stage Company of Toronto, Ontario featured Rock 'n' Roll in their 2009–2010 season between 28 September and 24 October.

ACT Theatre in Seattle produced the play as part of their 2009 Season between 9 October and 8 November 2009.

Park Square Theatre in St. Paul, Minnesota produced Rock 'n' Roll beginning 15 January 2010, directed by Mary M. Finnerty.

A production was staged at The Questors Theatre in Ealing, West London, from 19 December 2009 to 2 January 2010.

The San Jose Stage Company presented a new production of Rock 'n' Roll from 10 February to 7 March 2010.

Horipro presented the first Japan production of the play at the Setagaya public theatre in Setagaya, Tokyo, from 3 to 29 August 2010.

Belmont Abbey College in Belmont, North Carolina will produce Rock 'n' Roll, directed by Simon Donoghue, beginning 24 February 2011.

St. Louis Actors' Studio (stlas.org) Produced Rock 'n' Roll in November 2010

National Theater of Kosovo will also produce Rock 'n' Roll beginning January 2011.

Yıldız Teknik Üniversitesi Oyuncuları (YUO) started rehearsals in November 2010 for a Turkish production.

The Kavinoky Theatre in Buffalo, New York produced "Rock 'N' Roll" in 2011 from 4 March to 3 April

The Sydney Theatre, Sydney, production by the Melbourne Theatre Company from 11 April 2008 to 17 May 2008

Moscow's production opened 22 September 2011 in RAMT (Russian Academic Youth Theatre)

The Guildford Acting School produced Rock 'N' Roll in 2023 from 25 to 27 May which featured MA & MFA Acting students in collaboration with BA Theatre Production and MA Stage & Production Management students https://www.gsauk.org/events/39601AJRRLKSVBMNJSKBSJSPPVNLVSKDK/book

Hampstead Theatre produced Rock 'N' Roll in 2023 from 6 December 2023 to 27 January 2024. Nina Raine directed. The cast included Nancy Carroll, Nathaniel Parker, and Jacob Fortune-Lloyd.

== Awards and nominations ==
=== Original London production ===
Year	Award	Category	Nominee	Result
2006	Evening Standard Theatre Award	Best Actor	Rufus Sewell	Won
2007	Laurence Olivier Award	Best New Play		Nominated
2007	Laurence Olivier Award	Best Actor	Rufus Sewell	Nominated
2007	Laurence Olivier Award	Best Actress	Sinead Cusack	Nominated
2007	Laurence Olivier Award	Best Sound Design	Ian Dickinson	Nominated

=== Original Broadway production ===
Year	Award	Category	Nominee	Result
2008	Tony Award	Best Play		Nominated
2008	Tony Award	Best Actor in a Play	Rufus Sewell	Nominated
2008	Tony Award	Best Featured Actress in a Play	Sinead Cusack	Nominated
2008	Tony Award	Best Lighting Design of a Play	Ian Dickinson	Nominated
2008	Drama Desk Award	Outstanding Play		Nominated
2008	Drama Desk Award	Outstanding Actor in a Play	Rufus Sewell	Nominated
2008	Drama Desk Award	Outstanding Featured Actress in a Play	Sinead Cusack	Nominated

== Bibliography ==
- Eno, Brian, and Mark Edwards. "Czechs and Thugs and Rock’n’Roll". The Times 11 June 2006. Accessed 28 April 2007. ["Tom Stoppard's new play centres on the pop band whose arrest launched a human-rights movement. He discusses how artists change the world."]
- Lawson, Mark. Radio interview with Tom Stoppard. Front Row, BBC Radio 4, 29 May 2006, RealAudio (30 mins.). Accessed 28 April 2007. (Listed on Arts and Drama: Front Row, BBC Radio 4. Accessed 28 April 2007.)
- Mastalir, Linda. "Tom Stoppard's Rock 'n' Roll. Radio Prague, Current Affairs. Transcript and audio file of a report on the play broadcast on Radio Prague on 28 June 2006. Accessed 28 April 2007.
