= The Invention of Love =

1997 play by Tom Stoppard

- Cover of the Grove Press edition
- Original language: English
- Written by: Tom Stoppard
- Characters: A. E. Housman; Alfred W. Pollard; Charon; Moses Jackson; John Ruskin; Benjamin Jowett; Jerome K. Jerome; Henry Labouchere; W. T. Stead; Frank Harris; Robinson Ellis; John Postgate; Walter Pater; Oscar Wilde; Bunthorne
- Subject: A. E. Housman
- Genre: Drama
- Setting: The river Styx

Premiere
- Date: October 1, 1997
- Place: (United Kingdom) UK

The Invention of Love is a 1997 British play by Tom Stoppard portraying the life of poet A. E. Housman, focusing specifically on his personal life and love for a college classmate. The play is written from the viewpoint of Housman, dealing with his memories at the end of his life, and contains many classical allusions. The Invention of Love won both the Evening Standard Award (U.K.) and the New York Drama Critics Circle Award (U.S.)

Considered by many to be Stoppard's finest play, it has been called "esoteric". In fact, to demystify the play's many historical and academic references, the New York production team provided the audiences with a 30-page booklet on the political and artistic history of the late-Victorian period. Harold Bloom, a scholar of Walter Pater, contended that the character of Housman and those in his circle are fabulated for dramatic effect, and the play's difficulties are not historical but its own. This clarified, he cited it in 2003 as Stoppard's "masterpiece to date".

== Synopsis ==
The play begins with A. E. Housman, dead at age 77, standing on the bank of the river Styx. About to board the ferry to the afterlife – captained by a petulant Charon – Housman begins to remember moments from his life, starting with his matriculation at Oxford University, where he studied Classics. The play unfolds in short scenes that trace, primarily, Housman's relationship with Moses Jackson, for whom he harboured a lifelong unrequited love. The scenes also explore late-Victorian artistic ideals, and Housman's intellectual growth into a preeminent Latin textual scholar. Throughout the play, the older Housman comments on and occasionally talks to the characters, including his younger self.

== Production history ==
The play premièred at the Cottesloe Theatre in the Royal National Theatre, London, on 25 September 1997, with old Housman (AEH) played by John Wood and the young Housman by Paul Rhys; Robert Portal played Jackson, Robin Soans played Pater and Harris, John Carlisle played Jowett and Stead, Benjamin Whitrow played Ruskin and Labouchere, Michael Bryant played Charon and the Chairman, and Michael Fitzgerald played Bunthorne and Wilde. It later moved into the larger Lyttelton Theatre, and then transferred to the Haymarket Theatre in 1998. The director was Richard Eyre. The production won the 1997 Evening Standard Award for Best Play.

The play premiered in the U.S. at San Francisco's American Conservatory Theater in 2000, directed by Carey Perloff. The play opened on Broadway at the Lyceum Theatre on 29 March 2001 and closed on 30 June 2001. Directed by Jack O'Brien, the cast starred Richard Easton as the older Housman and Robert Sean Leonard as the young Housman. Both actors won 2001 Tony Awards for their performances, as Best Actor and Best Featured Actor, respectively.

A revival at the Hampstead Theatre in 2024-25 directed by Blanche McIntyre starred Simon Russell Beale and Matthew Tennyson as the older and younger Housman, with Dickie Beau as Wilde, as well as Stephen Boxer (Jowett and Labouchere), Ben Lloyd-Hughes (Jackson), Michael Marcus (Chamberlain and Ellis), and Dominic Rowan (Ruskin, Stead, Jerome).

September - October 2026, an off-Broadway production will be staged at Theaterlab led by David Greenspan.

== Awards and nominations ==
- 1997 Evening Standard Award for Best Play
- 1998 Laurence Olivier Award for Best New Play (Nominated)
- 2001 New York Drama Critics Circle Award for Best Play
- 2001 Tony Award for Best Play (Nominated)
