= Tom Stoppard =

British playwright (1937–2025)

Sir Tom Stoppard OM CBE FRSL HonFBA
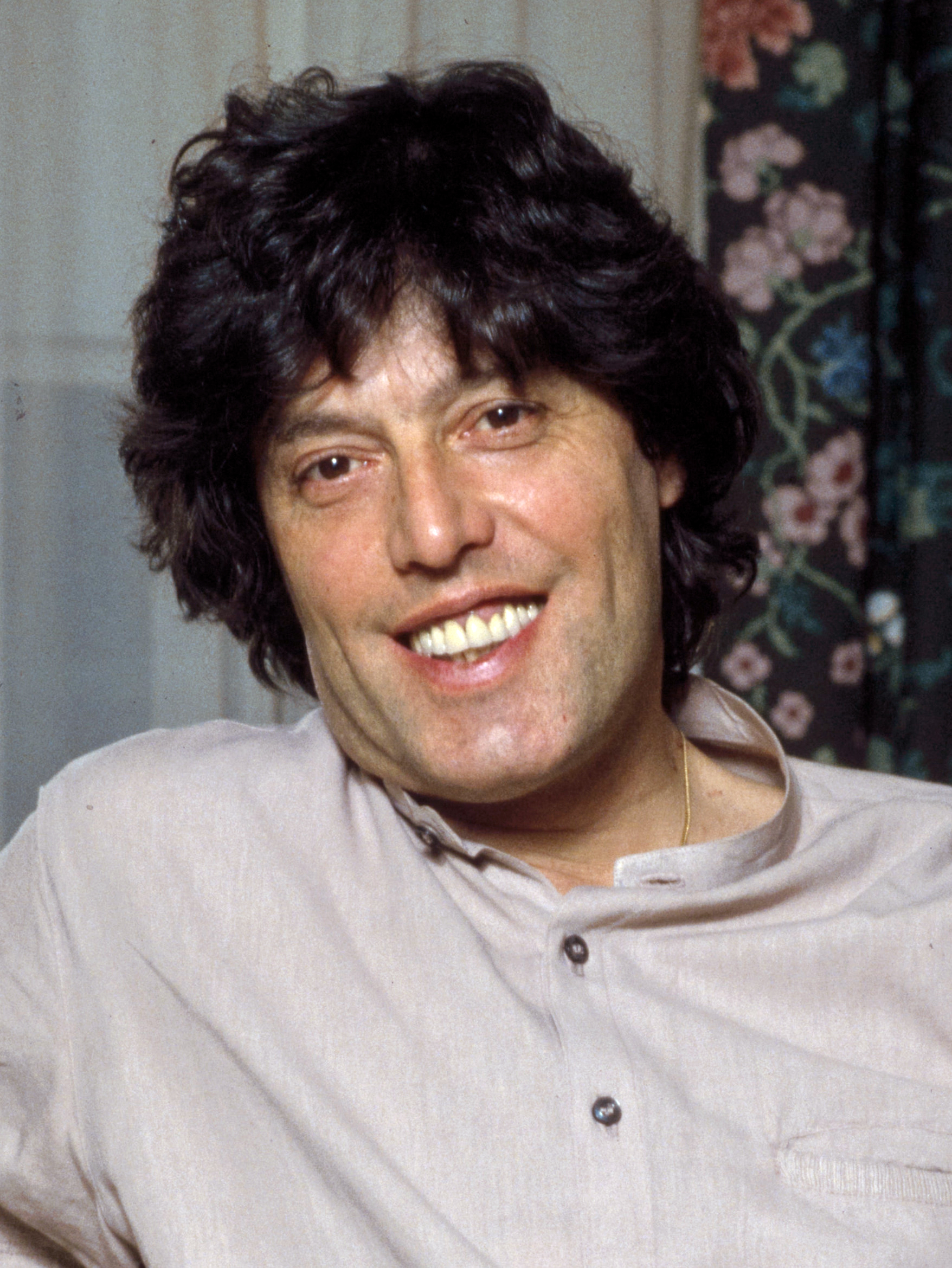
- Stoppard in c. 1985
- Born: Tomáš Sträussler; 3 July 1937; Zlín, Czechoslovakia
- Died: 29 November 2025 (aged 88); Dorset, England
- Citizenship: Czechoslovakia (before 1939); United Kingdom (after 1946)
- Occupations: Playwright; screenwriter
- Spouses: Josie Ingle (m. 1965; div. 1972) Miriam Stern (m. 1972; div. 1992) Sabrina Guinness (m. 2014)
- Partner: Felicity Kendal (1991–1998)
- Children: 4, including Ed
- Writing career
- Period: 1953–2020
- Genres: Dramatic comedy; tragicomedy
- Notable awards: Full list
- Website: www.unitedagents.co.uk/tom-stoppard

Sir Tom Stoppard (/ˈstɒpərd/; born Tomáš Sträussler; 3 July 1937 – 29 November 2025) was a British playwright and screenwriter. He wrote for film, radio, stage, and television, finding prominence with plays. His work covered the themes of human rights, censorship, and political freedom, often delving into the deeper philosophical bases of society. Stoppard, a playwright of the Royal National Theatre, was one of the most internationally performed dramatists of his generation and was critically compared with William Shakespeare and George Bernard Shaw. He was knighted for his contribution to theatre in 1997 and awarded the Order of Merit in 2000.

Born in Czechoslovakia, Stoppard left as a Jewish child refugee, fleeing imminent Nazi occupation. He spent three years at a boarding school in Darjeeling in the Indian Himalayas, then settled with his family in England after the war, in 1946. After being educated at schools in Nottingham and Yorkshire, Stoppard became a journalist, a drama critic and then, in 1960, a playwright.

Stoppard's most prominent plays include Rosencrantz and Guildenstern Are Dead (1966), Jumpers (1972), Travesties (1974), Night and Day (1978), The Real Thing (1982), Arcadia (1993), The Invention of Love (1997), The Coast of Utopia (2002), Rock 'n' Roll (2006), and Leopoldstadt (2020). He wrote the screenplays for Brazil (1985), Empire of the Sun (1987), The Russia House (1990), Billy Bathgate (1991), Shakespeare in Love (1998), Enigma (2001), and Anna Karenina (2012), as well as the BBC/HBO limited series Parade's End (2013). He directed the film Rosencrantz and Guildenstern Are Dead (1990), adapting his own 1966 play as its screenplay, with Gary Oldman and Tim Roth as the leads.

Stoppard received numerous accolades including an Academy Award for Best Original Screenplay for Shakespeare in Love, three Laurence Olivier Awards, and five Tony Awards. In 2008, The Daily Telegraph ranked him number 11 in their list of the "100 most powerful people in British culture". His final play, Leopoldstadt, set in the Jewish community of early 20th-century Vienna, premiered in 2020 at Wyndham's Theatre. It won the 2020 Laurence Olivier Award for Best New Play and later the 2023 Tony Award for Best Play.

== Early life and education ==
Stoppard was born Tomáš Sträussler in Zlín, Czechoslovakia (present day Czech Republic). He was the younger son of Martha Becková and Eugen Sträussler, a doctor employed by the Bata shoe company. His parents were non-observant Jews. Just before the German occupation of Czechoslovakia, the town's patron, Jan Antonín Baťa, transferred his Jewish employees, mostly physicians, to branches of his firm outside Europe. On 15 March 1939, the day the Nazis invaded Czechoslovakia, the Sträussler family fled to Singapore, where Bata had a factory.

Before the Japanese occupation of Singapore, Stoppard, his brother, and their mother fled to British India. Stoppard's father volunteered to remain in Singapore, knowing that as a doctor he would be needed in its defence. Stoppard long believed that his father had perished in Japanese captivity as a prisoner of war, but later discovered that his father had been reported drowned after the ship he was aboard was bombed by Japanese forces, as he tried to flee Singapore in 1942. In 1941, when Tomáš was four, he, his brother Petr, and their mother were evacuated to Darjeeling, India. The boys attended Mount Hermon School, an American multi-racial school, where the brothers became Tom and Peter.

In 1945, his mother married Kenneth Stoppard, a major in the British Army. Kenneth adopted her children and the family moved to Nottingham, England, in 1946. In Nottingham, Stoppard was "warmly welcomed" by his stepfather's family and he later noted that by this point in his life "English was my only language. Suddenly I was an English schoolboy." Stoppard once wrote that his upbringing in England led him to become "an honorary Englishman", and stated that "I fairly often find I'm with people who forget I don't quite belong in the world we're in. I find I put a foot wrong—it could be pronunciation, an arcane bit of English history—and suddenly I'm there naked, as someone with a pass, a press ticket." This is reflected in his characters, he observed, who are "constantly being addressed by the wrong name, with jokes and false trails to do with the confusion of having two names." Stoppard attended the Dolphin School, a preparatory school in Nottinghamshire, and later Pocklington School, a private school in the East Riding of Yorkshire. Pocklington School built the Tom Stoppard Theatre in his name, which he opened in May 2001.

Stoppard left school at 17 and began work as a journalist for the Western Daily Press in Bristol. Years later, he came to regret the decision to forgo a university education, but at the time, he loved his work as a journalist and was passionate about his career. He worked at the paper from 1954 until 1958, when the Bristol Evening World offered Stoppard the position of feature writer, humour columnist, and secondary drama critic, which took him into the world of theatre. At the Bristol Old Vic, a well-regarded regional repertory company, Stoppard formed friendships with director John Boorman and actor Peter O'Toole early in their careers. In Bristol, he became known more for his strained attempts at humour and unstylish clothes than for his writing.

== Career ==
=== Early work ===
Stoppard wrote short radio plays in 1953–54 and by 1960 he had completed his first stage play, A Walk on the Water, which was developed and retitled Enter a Free Man (1968). He said the work owed much to Robert Bolt's play Flowering Cherry (1958) and Arthur Miller's Death of a Salesman (1949). Within a week of sending A Walk on the Water to an agent, Stoppard received his version of the "Hollywood-style telegrams that change struggling young artists' lives". His first play was optioned, staged in Hamburg, then broadcast on British Independent Television in 1963. From September 1962 until April 1963, Stoppard worked in London as a drama critic for Scene magazine, writing reviews and interviews under his own name and the pseudonym William Boot (taken from Evelyn Waugh's Scoop). In 1964, a Ford Foundation grant enabled Stoppard to spend five months writing in a Berlin mansion, emerging with a one-act play titled Rosencrantz and Guildenstern Meet King Lear, which later evolved into his Tony-winning play Rosencrantz and Guildenstern Are Dead.

In the following years, Stoppard produced several works for radio, television and the theatre, including "M" is for Moon Among Other Things (1964), A Separate Peace (1966) and If You're Glad I'll Be Frank (1966). On 11 April 1967 – following acclaim at the 1966 Edinburgh Festival – the opening of Rosencrantz and Guildenstern Are Dead in a National Theatre production at the Old Vic made Stoppard an overnight success. Jumpers (1972) places a professor of moral philosophy in a murder mystery thriller alongside a slew of radical gymnasts. Travesties (1974) explored the "Wildean" possibilities arising from the fact that Vladimir Lenin, James Joyce, and Tristan Tzara had all been in Zürich during the First World War. Stoppard wrote one novel, Lord Malquist and Mr Moon (1966). Its narrative follows the failing historian Moon, who takes the job of Boswell to the aristocrat Malquist. While not critically successful, the novel contains character tropes and themes that would later be used in Stoppard's plays.

=== 1980s ===
In the 1980s, in addition to writing his own works, Stoppard translated many plays into English, including works by Sławomir Mrożek, Johann Nestroy, Arthur Schnitzler, and Václav Havel. Stoppard became influenced by the works of Polish and Czech absurdists. He was co-opted into the Outrapo group, a far-from-serious French movement to improve actors' stage technique through science.

In 1982, Stoppard premiered his play The Real Thing. The story revolves around a male-female relationship and the struggle between the actress and the member of a group fighting to free a Scottish soldier imprisoned for burning a memorial wreath during a protest. The leading roles were originated by Roger Rees and Felicity Kendal. The story examines various constructs of honesty including a play within a play, to explore the theme of reality versus appearance. It has been described as one of Stoppard's "most popular, enduring and autobiographical plays."

The play made its Broadway transfer in 1984, directed by Mike Nichols, starring Jeremy Irons and Glenn Close, with Christine Baranski in a supporting role. The transfer was a critical success with The New York Times theatre critic Frank Rich declaring, "The Broadway version of The Real Thing—a substantial revision of the original London production—is not only Mr. Stoppard's most moving play, but also the most bracing play that anyone has written about love and marriage in years." The production earned seven Tony Award nominations, winning five awards, including Best Play, as well as awards for Nichols, Irons, Close, and Baranski. This was Stoppard's third Tony Award for Best Play, following Rosencrantz and Guildenstern Are Dead in 1968 and Travesties in 1976.

In 1985, Stoppard co-wrote Brazil, a satirical science-fiction dark comedy film, with Terry Gilliam and Charles McKeown. The film received near universal acclaim. Pauline Kael, critic for The New Yorker, declared "Visually, it's an original, bravura piece of moviemaking... Gilliam's vision is an organic thing on the screen—and that's a considerable achievement". Stoppard, Gilliam, and McKeown were nominated for the Academy Award for Best Original Screenplay, losing to Witness. Stoppard went on to write the scripts for Steven Spielberg's films Empire of the Sun (1987), based on the book by J. G. Ballard, and Indiana Jones and the Last Crusade (1989). Spielberg later stated that though Stoppard was uncredited for the latter of the two, "he was responsible for almost every line of dialogue in the film".

For his 1985 appearance on BBC Radio 4's Desert Island Discs, Stoppard chose "Careless Love" by Bessie Smith as his favourite track. He also selected Inferno in two languages by Dante Alighieri as his chosen book and a plastic football as his luxury item.

=== 1990s ===
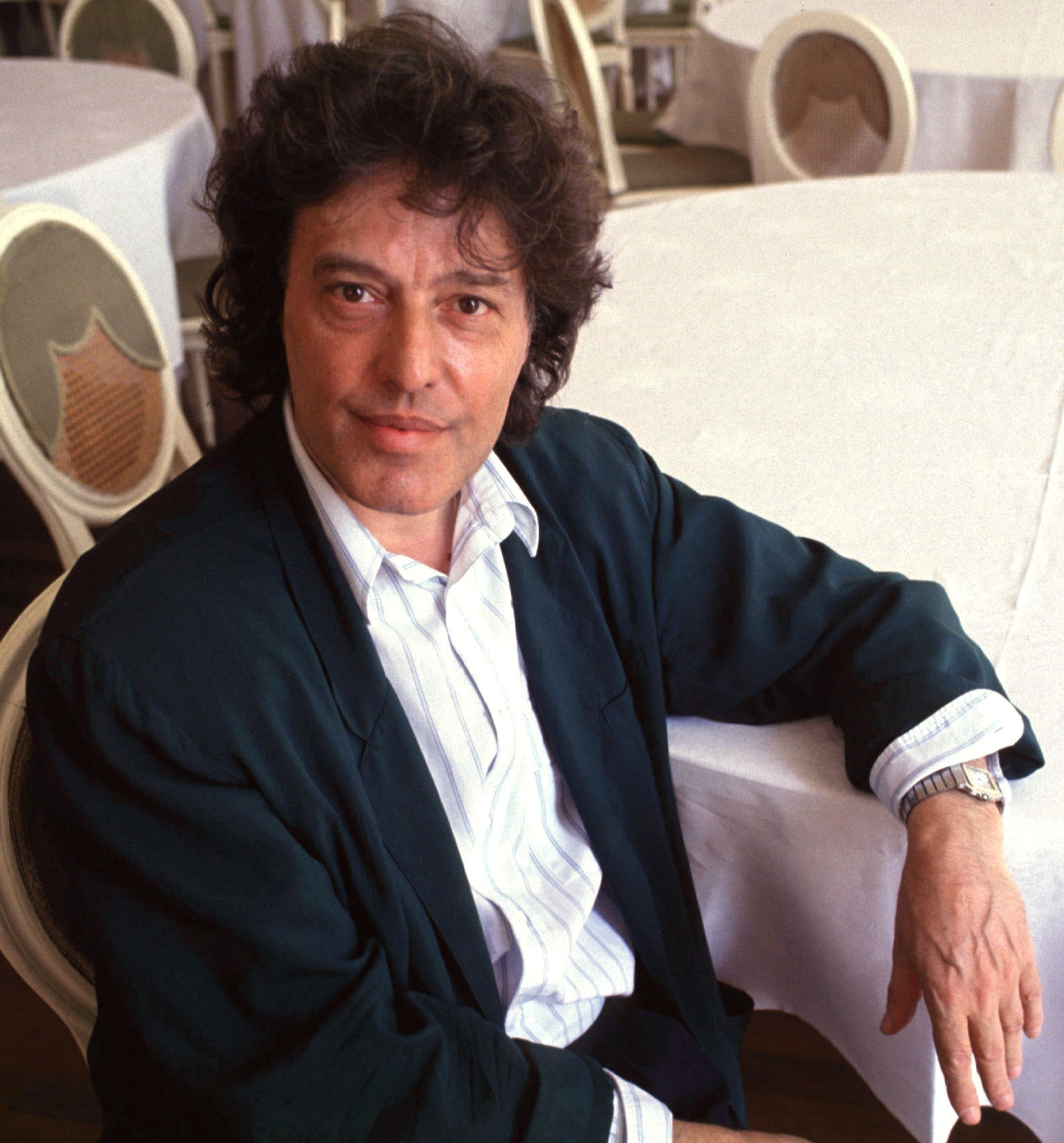
Stoppard in 1990

In 1993, Stoppard wrote Arcadia, a play in which he explores the interaction between two modern academics and the residents of a Derbyshire country house in the early 19th century, including aristocrats, tutors and the fleeting presence, unseen on stage, of Lord Byron. The themes of the play include the philosophical implications of the second law of thermodynamics, Romantic literature, and the English picturesque style of garden design.

Arcadia was first performed at the Royal National Theatre in a production directed by Trevor Nunn and starring Rufus Sewell, Felicity Kendal, Bill Nighy, Harriet Walter and Emma Fielding. It won the 1993 Laurence Olivier Award for Best New Play. A year later the play made its transfer on Broadway starring Billy Crudup, Blair Brown, Victor Garber and Robert Sean Leonard. The production was well received with Vincent Canby of The New York Times writing, that while "There are real difficulties with this production... [there are] also great pleasures, not the least of which are Mark Thompson's sets and costumes. Mostly, though, there are Mr. Stoppard's grandly eclectic obsessions and his singular gifts as a playwright. Attend to them." The production received three nominations at the 49th Tony Awards including Best Play, losing to Terrence McNally's Love! Valour! Compassion!.

Stoppard wrote the screenplay for Shakespeare in Love (1998) with Marc Norman. The film, a romantic comedy, focuses on a fictional story involving William Shakespeare and his romance with a young woman who is an inspiration for the play Romeo and Juliet. The film starred an ensemble cast including Joseph Fiennes, Gwyneth Paltrow, Geoffrey Rush, Colin Firth, and Judi Dench. It was a critical and financial success and went on to earn seven Academy Awards including Best Picture. Stoppard received his second career Oscar nomination and first win for Best Original Screenplay. He also received the Golden Globe Award for the screenplay.

=== 2000s ===
The Coast of Utopia (2002) was a trilogy of plays Stoppard wrote about the philosophical arguments among Russian revolutionary figures in the late 19th century. The trilogy comprises Voyage, Shipwreck, and Salvage. Major figures in the play include Mikhail Bakunin, Ivan Turgenev, and Alexander Herzen. The title comes from a chapter in Avrahm Yarmolinsky's book Road to Revolution: A Century of Russian Radicalism (1959). The play premiered in 2002 at the National Theatre, directed by Trevor Nunn; its total length spanned nine hours. The play received three Laurence Olivier Award nominations including Best New Play, ultimately losing in all its categories. In 2006, it made its Broadway premiere in a production starring Billy Crudup, Jennifer Ehle, and Ethan Hawke. The play received 10 nominations winning seven Tony awards including for Best Play, Stoppard's fourth win in the category.

Rock 'n' Roll (2006) was set in Cambridge and Prague. The play explored the culture of 1960s rock music, especially the persona of Syd Barrett and the political challenge of the Czech band The Plastic People of the Universe, mirroring the contrast between liberal society in England and the repressive Czech state after the Warsaw Pact intervention in the Prague Spring.

Stoppard served on the advisory board of the magazine Standpoint, and was instrumental in its foundation, giving the opening speech at its launch. He was also a patron of the Shakespeare Schools Festival, a charity that enables school children across the UK to perform Shakespeare in professional theatres. Stoppard was appointed president of the London Library in 2002 and vice-president in 2017 following the election of Sir Tim Rice as president.

=== 2010s ===
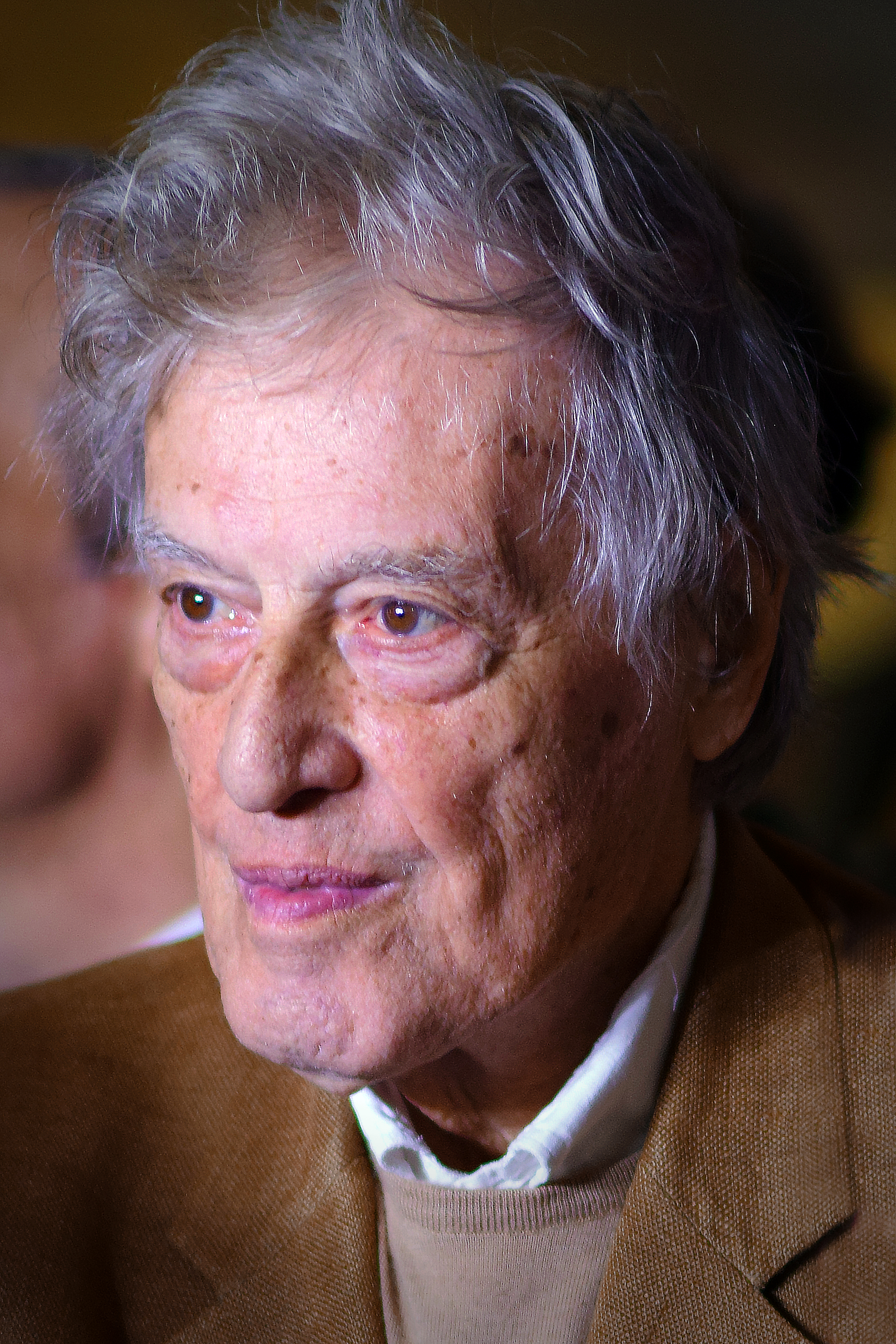
Stoppard at the 2022 Broadway opening night of Leopoldstadt

For Joe Wright, Stoppard adapted Leo Tolstoy's Anna Karenina into the 2012 film adaptation starring Keira Knightley. Film critic Lisa Schwarzbaum for Entertainment Weekly praised the film, writing "Stoppard—himself a master of puzzle-like construction in fine plays including Arcadia—supplies an excellently clean, delicately balanced script."

In 2012, Stoppard wrote a five-part limited series for television, Parade's End, which revolves around a love triangle between a conservative English aristocrat, his mean socialite wife and a young suffragette. The series premiered on BBC Two, starring Benedict Cumberbatch and Rebecca Hall. The series received widespread acclaim from critics with The Independent's Grace Dent proclaiming it "one of the finest things the BBC has ever made". IndieWire declared, "Parade's End is wonderful accomplishment, smart, adult television". Stoppard received a British Academy Television Award and Primetime Emmy Award nomination for the series.

It was announced in June 2019 that Stoppard had written a new play, set in the Jewish community of early 20th-century Vienna. Leopoldstadt premiered in January 2020 at Wyndham's Theatre and went on to win the Laurence Olivier Award for Best New Play. It then transferred to Broadway, opening on 2 October 2022. The play was nominated for six Tony Awards and won four, including Best Play.

== Screenwriting ==
Stoppard also co-wrote screenplays including Indiana Jones and the Last Crusade (1989) and Shakespeare in Love (1998). He also did minor work on Star Wars: Episode III – Revenge of the Sith, though again he received no official or formal credit in this script doctor role. He worked in a similar capacity with Tim Burton on his film Sleepy Hollow.

== Radio plays ==
Among other work, Stoppard's philosophical comedy radio drama Darkside (2013) was written for BBC Radio 2 to celebrate the 40th anniversary of Pink Floyd's album The Dark Side of the Moon.

== Themes ==
=== Existentialism ===
Rosencrantz and Guildenstern Are Dead (1966–67) was Stoppard's first major play to gain recognition. The story of Hamlet as told from the viewpoint of two courtiers echoes Beckett in its double act repartee, existential themes and language play. "Stoppardian" became a term describing works using wit and comedy while addressing philosophical concepts. Critic Dennis Kennedy commented:

It established several characteristics of Stoppard's dramaturgy: his word-playing intellectuality, audacious, paradoxical, and self-conscious theatricality, and preference for reworking pre-existing narratives... Stoppard's plays have been sometimes dismissed as pieces of clever showmanship, lacking in substance, social commitment, or emotional weight. His theatrical surfaces serve to conceal rather than reveal their author's views, and his fondness for towers of paradox spirals away from social comment. This is seen most clearly in his comedies The Real Inspector Hound (1968) and After Magritte (1970), which create their humour through highly formal devices of reframing and juxtaposition.

Stoppard himself went so far as to declare "I must stop compromising my plays with this whiff of social application. They must be entirely untouched by any suspicion of usefulness." He acknowledges that he started off "as a language nerd", primarily enjoying linguistic and ideological playfulness, feeling early in his career that journalism was far better suited for presaging political change, than playwriting.

=== Intellectuality ===
The accusations of favouring intellectuality over political commitment or commentary were met with a change of tack, as Stoppard produced increasingly socially engaged work. From 1977, he became personally involved with human-rights issues, in particular with the situation of political dissidents in Central and Eastern Europe. In February 1977, he visited the Soviet Union and several Eastern European countries with a member of Amnesty International. In June, Stoppard met Vladimir Bukovsky in London and travelled to Czechoslovakia (then under communist control), where he met dissident playwright and future president Václav Havel, whose writing he greatly admired. Stoppard became involved with Index on Censorship, Amnesty International, and the Committee Against Psychiatric Abuse and wrote various newspaper articles and letters about human rights. He was instrumental in translating Havel's works into English. Every Good Boy Deserves Favour (1977), "a play for actors and orchestra", was based on a request by conductor/composer André Previn and was inspired by a meeting with a Russian exile. This play, as well as Dogg's Hamlet, Cahoot's Macbeth (1979), The Coast of Utopia (2002), Rock 'n' Roll (2006), and two works for television – Professional Foul (1977) and Squaring the Circle (1984) – all concern themes of censorship, rights abuses, and state repression.

Stoppard's later works sought greater interpersonal depths, whilst maintaining their intellectual playfulness. Stoppard stated that around 1982 he moved away from the "argumentative" works and more towards plays of the heart, as he became "less shy" about emotional openness. Discussing the later integration of heart and mind in his work, he commented, "I think I was too concerned when I set off, to have a firework go off every few seconds... I think I was always looking for the entertainer in myself and I seem to be able to entertain through manipulating language... [but] it's really about human beings, it's not really about language at all." The Real Thing (1982) uses a meta-theatrical structure to explore the suffering that adultery can produce and The Invention of Love (1997) also investigates the pain of passion. Arcadia (1993) explores the meeting of chaos theory, historiography, and landscape gardening. He was inspired by a Trevor Nunn production of Gorky's Summerfolk to write a trilogy of "human" plays: The Coast of Utopia (Voyage, Shipwreck and Salvage, 2002).

Stoppard commented that he loved the medium of theatre for how "adjustable" and independent from the text it was. His experience of writing for film was similar, offering the liberating opportunity to "play God", in control of creative reality. It often took four to five years from the first idea of a play to staging, as he made efforts to be as accurate in his research as possible.

== Personal life ==
=== Family and relationships ===
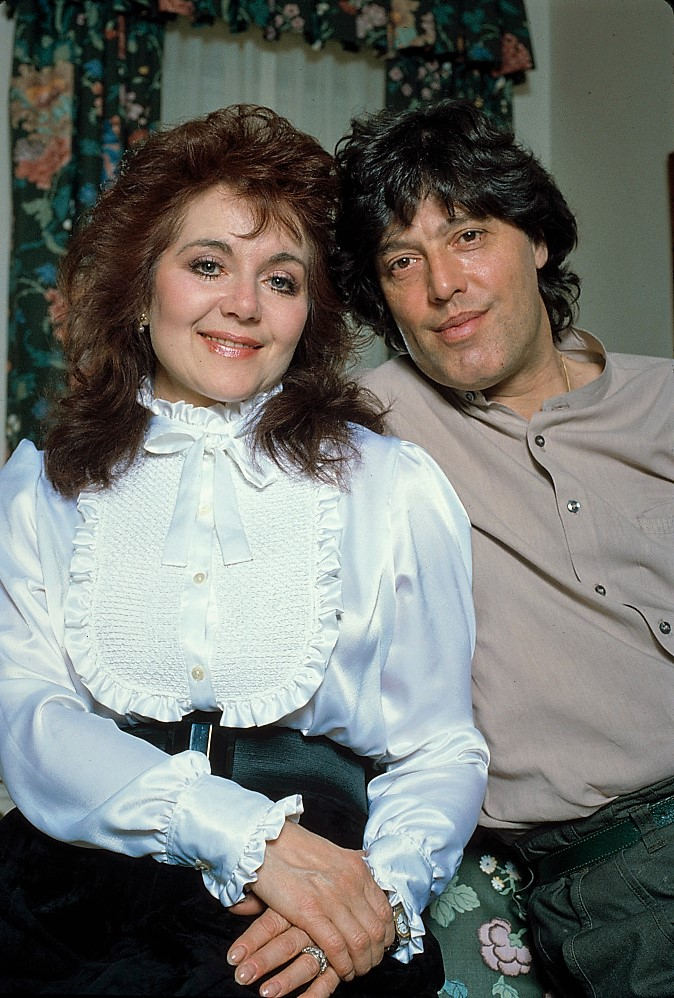
Miriam and Tom Stoppard, New York City, c. 1985

Stoppard was married three times. His first marriage (1965–1972) was to Josie Ingle, a nurse. His second marriage (1972–92) was to Miriam Stern; they separated when he began a relationship with actress Felicity Kendal. He also had a relationship with actress Sinéad Cusack, but she made it clear she wished to remain married to Jeremy Irons and stay close to their two sons. Also, after she was reunited with a son she had given up for adoption, she wished to spend time with him in Dublin rather than with Stoppard in the house they shared in France. He had two sons from each of his first two marriages: Oliver Stoppard, Barnaby Stoppard, the actor Ed Stoppard, and Will Stoppard, who is married to violinist Linzi Stoppard. In 2014 he married Sabrina Guinness.

Stoppard's mother died in 1996. The family had not talked about their history and neither brother knew what had happened to the family left behind in Czechoslovakia. In the early 1990s, with the fall of communism, Stoppard found out that all four of his grandparents had been Jewish and had died in Terezin, Auschwitz, and other camps, along with three of his mother's sisters.

In 1998, following the deaths of his parents, he returned to Zlín for the first time in more than 50 years. He expressed grief both for a lost father and a missing past, but he had no sense of being a survivor, stating: "I feel incredibly lucky not to have had to survive or die. It's a conspicuous part of what might be termed a charmed life."

Stoppard was a friend of journalist and popular historian Paul Johnson, and dedicated his 1978 play Night and Day to him.

In 2013, Stoppard asked Hermione Lee to write his biography. The book was published in 2020.

=== Political views ===
In 1979, the year of Margaret Thatcher's election, Stoppard noted to Paul Delaney: "I'm a conservative with a small c. I am a conservative in politics, literature, education and theatre." In 2007, Stoppard described himself as a "timid libertarian".

The Tom Stoppard Prize (Czech: Cena Toma Stopparda) was created in 1983 under the Charter 77 Foundation and is awarded to authors of Czech origin.

In 2014, Stoppard publicly backed "Hacked Off" and its campaign towards press self-regulation by "safeguarding the press from political interference while also giving vital protection to the vulnerable".

=== Death ===
On 29 November 2025, Stoppard died peacefully at his home in Dorset, England, at the age of 88, surrounded by members of his family. Many statements in tribute were made and King Charles issued a statement:

My wife and I are deeply saddened to learn of the death of one of our greatest writers, Sir Tom Stoppard.

A dear friend who wore his genius lightly, he could, and did, turn his pen to any subject, challenging, moving and inspiring his audiences, borne from his own personal history. We send our most heartfelt sympathy to his beloved family. Let us all take comfort in his immortal line: "Look on every exit as being an entrance somewhere else".

— King Charles III

A memorial held at the National Theatre included performances from Glenn Close, Benedict Cumberbatch, Felicity Kendal, Jeremy Irons, Harriet Walter, and Ed Stoppard, and brief speeches by Richard Eyre, Trevor Nunn, and Mick Jagger.

== Legacy and honours ==
Stoppard was one of the most internationally performed dramatists of his generation and was critically compared with William Shakespeare and George Bernard Shaw. After his death, The New Yorker wrote that "he left behind a theatre changed by his blistering intellect and blazing success" and that he was "theatre's primary influence". Writing in The Guardian, Michael Billington compared him to Samuel Beckett, Michael Frayn, and Harold Pinter with "a capacity to make ideas dance", and described his main achievement as showing "that audiences were open to plays about complex ideas". He also noted Stoppard's emotional and political themes in plays such as Arcadia and Professional Foul. The Wall Street Journal stated that he

may or may not have been the greatest playwright of the past half century or so, but he was undoubtedly the most intellectually daring, historically inquisitive and encyclopedically knowledgeable. If you throw in the rhetorical brilliance, the heart and the boundless wit that coursed through his greatest works, his pre-eminence is hard to challenge. Across his career he collected five Tony Awards for best play (a record) and an Oscar for the screenplay for Shakespeare in Love—probably the work that brought him the largest audience.

The theater's importance as a locus of intelligent inquiry and intellectual ferment—not momentous, alas—owes a great debt to his influence.

— Charles Isherwood

=== Awards ===
In July 2013, Stoppard was awarded the PEN Pinter Prize for "determination to tell things as they are".

In July 2017, Stoppard was elected an Honorary Fellow of the British Academy (HonFBA), the United Kingdom's national academy for the humanities and social sciences. Stoppard was appointed Cameron Mackintosh Visiting Professor of Contemporary Theatre at St Catherine's College, Oxford, for the academic year 2017/18.

=== Representations in art ===
Stoppard has been represented in various forms of art. He sat for sculptor Alan Thornhill, and a bronze head is now in public collection, situated with the Stoppard papers in the reading room of the Harry Ransom Center at the University of Texas at Austin. The terracotta remains in the collection of the artist in London. The correspondence file relating to the Stoppard bust is held in the archive of the Henry Moore Foundation's Henry Moore Institute in Leeds.

Stoppard also sat for the sculptor Angela Conner, who was a friend, and his bronze portrait bust is on display in the grounds of Chatsworth House in the Derbyshire Dales.

=== Archive ===
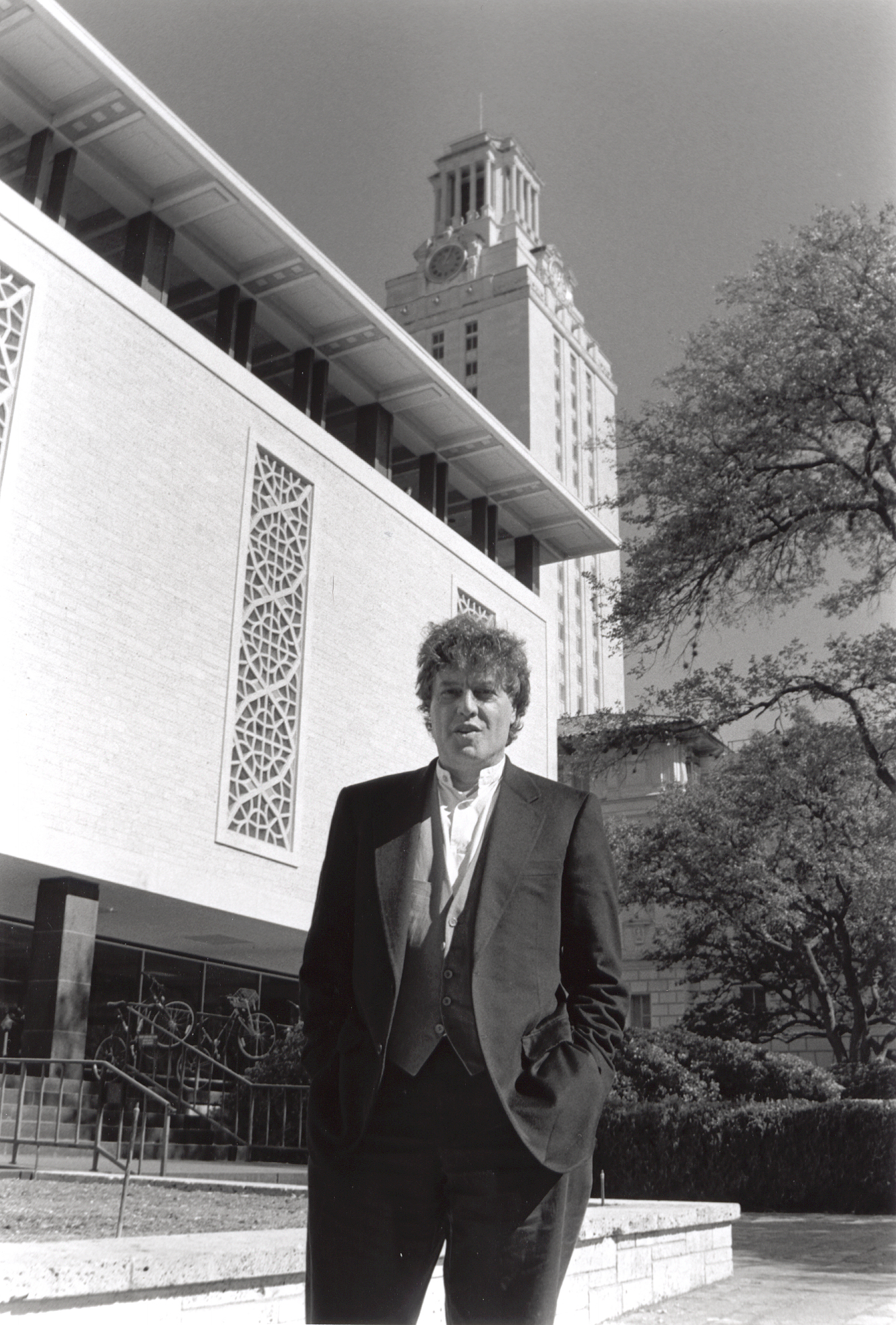
Stoppard at the Harry Ransom Center, 1996

Stoppard's papers are housed at the Harry Ransom Center at the University of Texas at Austin. The archive was first established by Stoppard in 1991 and continues to grow. The collection consists of typescript and handwritten drafts, revision pages, outlines, and notes; production material, including cast lists, set drawings, schedules, and photographs; theatre programmes; posters; advertisements; clippings; page and galley proofs; dust jackets; correspondence; legal documents and financial papers, including passports, contracts, and royalty and account statements; itineraries; appointment books and diary sheets; photographs; sheet music; sound recordings; a scrapbook; artwork; minutes of meetings; and publications.

== Works ==
The British Library published a comprehensive and substantial bibliography for Stoppard in 2010: Tom Stoppard: A Bibliographical History. This also included a CD-ROM containing illustrations.

=== Prose ===
- 1964: Introduction II: Stories by New Writers – Stoppard contributed three short stories to this anthology. A fourth story, rejected by the editors, served as the basis for M is for 'Moon' Among Other Things.
  - "Reunion"
  - "Life, Times: Fragment"
  - "The Story" – later adapted for television by Stoppard as A Paragraph for Mr. Blake
- 1966: Lord Malquist and Mr Moon

=== Theatre ===
- 1960: A Walk on the Water, adapted for television in 1963 and re-written as Enter a Free Man in 1968.
- 1965: The Gamblers – based on the novel The Gambler by Dostoevsky
- 1965: Higg and Cogg – curtain-raiser for The Gamblers
- 1966: Tango – adapted from Sławomir Mrożek's play and Nicholas Bethell's translation, it premiered at the Aldwych Theatre, London
- 1966: Rosencrantz and Guildenstern Are Dead, first staged at the Edinburgh Festival Fringe on 24 August 1966, by the Oxford Theatre Group. The play debuted in London with a production at The Old Vic on 11 April 1967.
- 1968: Enter a Free Man – first performed on 28 March 1968 at the St. Martin's Theatre in London. As it consists largely of material from his 1960 play A Walk on the Water, it has sometimes been described as Stoppard's first play.
- 1968: The Real Inspector Hound – the first performance took place at the Criterion Theatre in London on 17 June 1968
- 1969: Albert's Bridge – premiered at St. Mary's Hall in Edinburgh
- 1969: If You're Glad I'll Be Frank – premiered at St Mary's Hall in Edinburgh
- 1970: After Magritte – frequently performed as a companion piece to The Real Inspector Hound
- 1971: Dogg's Our Pet – first performed at the Almost Free Theatre on 7 December 1971
- 1972: Jumpers – based in part upon Stoppard's television play Another Moon Called Earth; first performed by the National Theatre Company at the Old Vic Theatre, London, on 2 February 1972
- 1973: Galileo – Stoppard began working on an adaptation of Bertolt Brecht's Life of Galileo as a screenplay in 1969. Due to a lack of interest from various Hollywood studios, Stoppard rewrote the script to be performed at the London Planetarium some time in 1973. However, technical difficulties led to the cancellation of the production, and Stoppard abandoned his work on the project. The play was eventually published in a 2003 issue of Areté and performed in 2004 at the Edinburgh Fringe.
- 1973: The House of Bernarda Alba – adaptation of the play by Federico Garcia Lorca, based on a translation by Kate Kendall. Performed at the Greenwich Theatre.
- 1974: Travesties – first produced at the Aldwych Theatre, London, on 10 June 1974, by the Royal Shakespeare Company
- 1976: Dirty Linen and New-Found-Land – first performed as an Ambiance Lunch-Hour Theatre Club presentation at Interaction's Almost Free Theatre on 6 April 1976
- 1976: 15-Minute Hamlet – included in Pieces of Eight, a 1982 performance of eight one-act plays by eight playwrights as The (15 Minute) Dogg's Troupe Hamlet
- 1977: Every Good Boy Deserves Favour – written at the request of André Previn (the play calls for a full orchestra)
- 1978: Night and Day, which won the Evening Standard Award for Best Play
- 1979: Dogg's Hamlet, Cahoot's Macbeth – two plays written to be performed together. Stoppard described Dogg's Hamlet as "a conflation of two pieces... namely Dogg's Our Pet... and The Dogg's Troupe 15-Minute Hamlet.
- 1979: Undiscovered Country – first produced at the Olivier Theatre in London, Stoppard's play is an adaptation of Das weite Land by the Austrian playwright Arthur Schnitzler, which focuses on 1890s Viennese society, demonstrating the effects of upper class codes of behaviour on human relationships. The title of the play is a reference to the concept of the afterlife as the "undiscovered country" from the "To be, or not to be" soliloquy in Hamlet.
- 1981: On the Razzle – based on Einen Jux will er sich machen by Johann Nestroy, Stoppard's play opened on 18 September 1981 at the Royal National Theatre in London
- 1982: The Real Thing – opened at the Strand Theatre, London, on 16 November 1982
- 1983: English libretto for The Love for Three Oranges (original opera by Sergei Prokofiev)
- 1984: Rough Crossing – based on Play at the Castle by Ferenc Molnár, it opened at the Lyttelton Theatre in London on 30 October 1984
- 1986: Dalliance – an adaptation of Arthur Schnitzler's Liebelei, Dalliance was first performed at the Lyttelton Theatre, London, on 27 May 1986
- 1987: Largo Desolato – a translation of a play by Václav Havel
- 1988: Artist Descending a Staircase, a radio play, originally broadcast on BBC Radio 3 on 14 November 1972. A stage adaptation, written by Stoppard, was first performed at the King's Head Theatre, Islington, London in 1988, and later transferred to The Duke of York's Theatre, London. The title alludes to Marcel Duchamp's 1912 painting Nude Descending a Staircase, No. 2.
- 1988: Hapgood – first performed at the Aldwych Theatre, London, on 8 March 1988
- 1993: Arcadia – first performed at the Royal National Theatre in London on 13 April 1993, in a production directed by Trevor Nunn
- 1993: The Merry Widow – linking narration for performances of the operetta by Franz Lehár by Glyndebourne Opera
- 1995: Indian Ink – based on Stoppard's radio play In the Native State, the stage version of Indian Ink had its first performance at the Yvonne Arnaud Theatre, Guildford, and opened at the Aldwych Theatre, London, on 27 February 1995.
- 1997: The Invention of Love – portrayed the life of poet A. E. Housman, focusing specifically on his personal life and love for a college classmate. The play was first performed in the Cottesloe Theatre of the Royal National Theatre on 25 September 1997 and won both the Evening Standard Award and the New York Drama Critics Circle Award.
- 1997: The Seagull – a translation of Anton Chekhov's play, it was first performed at The Old Vic theatre in London on 28 April 1997
- 2002: The Coast of Utopia – a trilogy of plays: Voyage, Shipwreck, and Salvage. The trilogy, nine hours in total, premiered with Voyage on 22 June 2002 at the Royal National Theatre's Olivier auditorium in repertory. The openings of Shipwreck and Salvage followed on 8 and 19 July, completing The Coast of Utopia's run on 23 November 2002.
- 2004: Enrico IV (Henry IV) – a translation of the Italian play by Luigi Pirandello, it was first presented at the Donmar Theatre, London, in April 2004.
- 2005: The Merchant of Venice, a half-hour adaptation of the play by William Shakespeare for young actors. It premiered on 5 April 2005 at the Royal Opera House in a performance by the National Youth Theatre
- 2005: Heroes – a translation of the French play Le Vent des peupliers by Gérald Sibleyras, it was first performed at Wyndham's Theatre, London, on 18 October 2005.
- 2006: Rock 'n' Roll – first performed on 3 June 2006 at the Royal Court Theatre
- 2008: Ivanov – an adaptation of the play by Anton Chekhov based on the translation by Helen Rappaport, it was first performed at Wyndham's Theatre in 2008.
- 2009: The Cherry Orchard – a translation of the play by Anton Chekhov first performed at the Brooklyn Academy of Music in January 2009.
- 2010: The Laws of War – a contribution to a collaborative piece for a one-night benefit performance in support of Human Rights Watch
- 2015: The Hard Problem was first performed in the Dorfman Theatre of the Royal National Theatre on 28 January 2015.
- 2019: Penelope – monodrama with music written by Andre Previn; first performed on 24 July 2019 at the Tanglewood Music Festival
- 2020: Leopoldstadt – first performed in January 2020 at Wyndham's Theatre in London, it went on to win the Laurence Olivier Award for Best New Play.

=== Radio ===
- 1964: The Dissolution of Dominic Boot – written for a BBC series of 15-minute radio plays, Just before Midnight
- 1964: 'M' is for Moon Amongst Other – written for a BBC series of 15-minute radio plays, Just before Midnight
- 1966: If You're Glad I'll be Frank – first broadcast on BBC Radio 3 on January 8, 1966. Later adapted as a stage play.
- 1967: Albert's Bridge – first broadcast on the BBC Third Programme on 13 July 1967
- 1968: Where Are They Now? – commissioned for Schools Radio and first broadcast on 28 January 1970
- 1972: Artist Descending a Staircase– first broadcast on BBC Radio 3 on 14 November 1972
- 1978: Rosencrantz and Guildenstern Are Dead – adaptation of Stoppard's 1966 play of the same name. First broadcast on BBC Radio Three on 24 December 1978.
- 1979: Professional Foul – adaptation of Stoppard's 1977 television play of the same name. First broadcast on BBC Radio Four on 17 June 1979.
- 1979: The Real Inspector Hound – adaptation of Stoppard's 1968 play of the same name. First broadcast on 26 December 1979.
- 1982: The Dog It Was That Died – first broadcast on BBC Radio 4 on 9 December 1982.
- 1990: Night and Day – adaptation of Stoppard's 1978 play of the same day. First broadcast by the BBC World Service in 1990.
- 1991: In the Native State – later expanded to become the stage play Indian Ink (1995)
- 1991: Undiscovered Country – adaptation of Stoppard's 1979 stage play of the same name, in turn adapted from Das weite land by Arthur Schnitzler.
- 1992: The Real Thing – adaptation of Stoppard's 1982 stage play of the same name.
- 1993: Arcadia – adaptation of Stoppard's 1993 stage play of the same name.
- 1994: Three Men in a Boat – adaptation of Stoppard's 1975 television play based in turn on the novel by Jerome K. Jerome.
- 1999: The Invention of Love – adaptation of Stoppard's 1997 stage play of the same name.
- 2003: Dalliance – adaptation of Stoppard's 1986 adaptation of Arthur Schnitzler's Liebelei. Broadcast on BBC Radio Three on 17 January 2003 starring Hugh Grant and Douglas Hodge.
- 2007: On Dover Beach
- 2012: Albert's Bridge, Artist Descending a Staircase, The Dog It Was That Died and In the Native State were published by the British Library as Tom Stoppard Radio Plays
- 2013: Darkside – written for BBC Radio 2 to celebrate the 40th anniversary of Pink Floyd's album Dark Side of the Moon.

=== Television ===
- 1963: A Walk on the Water – broadcast in November 1963 on ITV. Re-broadcast on the BBC in 1964 as The Preservation of George Riley. Adapted from the play of the same name and later re-written by Stoppard as Enter a Free Man.
- 1965: A Paragraph for Mr. Blake – adapted from Stoppard's own short story, "The Story," as The Explorers. The program was significantly changed by the producer prior to its October 1965 broadcast on ITV as an episode of Knock on Any Door.
- 1965: A Separate Peace – broadcast in August 1966 to accompany a BBC documentary about chess players that Stoppard made with Christopher Martin
- 1966: Teeth – broadcast on February 8, 1967 on Thirty-Minute Theatre.
- 1967: Another Moon Called Earth (containing some dialogue and situations later incorporated into Jumpers); broadcast on June 28, 1967 on Thirty-Minute Theatre.
- 1968: Neutral Ground (a loose adaptation of Sophocles' Philoctetes) for television.
- 1970: The Engagement, a television version of The Dissolution of Dominic Boot on NBC Experiment in Television
- 1975: The Boundary – co-authored by Clive Exton, for the BBC
- 1975: Three Men in a Boat – adaptation of Jerome K. Jerome's novel for BBC Television
- 1977: Professional Foul – broadcast 24 September 1977 on BBC 2's Play of the Week.
- 1984: Squaring the Circle - broadcast 31 May 1984 on BBC 4.
- 1989: The Dog It Was That Died – adaptation of Stoppard's 1982 radio play broadcast 1 January 1989 on Granada TV
- 1998: Poodle Springs – a teleplay adaptation of the novel by Robert B. Parker and Raymond Chandler
- 2012: Parade's End – television screenplay for BBC/HBO of Ford Madox Ford's series of novels

=== Film ===
- 1975: The Romantic Englishwoman – co-authored with Thomas Wiseman
- 1978: Despair – screenplay for the film directed by Rainer Werner Fassbinder, starring Dirk Bogarde, based on the novel by Vladimir Nabokov
- 1979: The Human Factor – adaption of the novel by Graham Greene
- 1985: Brazil – co-authored with Terry Gilliam and Charles McKeown, script nominated for an Academy Award
- 1998: Shakespeare in Love – co-authored with Marc Norman; the script won an Academy Award
- 1987: Empire of the Sun – adapted from the novel by J. G. Ballard
- 1989: Indiana Jones and the Last Crusade – final rewrite of Jeffrey Boam's rewrite of Menno Meyjes's screenplay
- 1990: The Russia House – screenplay for the 1990 film of the novel by John le Carré
- 1990: Rosencrantz & Guildenstern are Dead – adaptation of his own stage play, which he directed; won the Golden Lion
- 1999: Sleepy Hollow – uncredited script doctor work
- 2001: Enigma – adaptation of the Robert Harris novel
- 2005: Star Wars: Episode III – Revenge of the Sith – dialogue-polish of George Lucas' screenplay
- 2005: The Golden Compass – a draft screenplay of the novel by Philip Pullman, not produced
- 2012: Anna Karenina – adaptation of the Leo Tolstoy novel
- 2014: Tulip Fever – adaptation of the Deborah Moggach novel, written with Moggach

== See also ==
- List of Academy Award winners and nominees from Great Britain
- List of British playwrights since 1950
- List of Tony Award records
- List of Golden Globe winners
- List of Jewish Academy Award winners and nominees

== Sources ==
- Hodgson, Terry (2001). The Plays of Tom Stoppard: For Stage, Radio, TV and Film. Duxford, England: Icon. ISBN 1-84046-241-8.
- Kelly, Katherine E., ed. (2001). The Cambridge Companion to Tom Stoppard. Cambridge: Cambridge University Press. ISBN 0-521-64592-1.
