= 69th Tony Awards =

2015 US theatrical awards ceremony

- Official poster
- Date: June 7, 2015
- Location: Radio City Music Hall, New York, New York
- Hosted by: Kristin Chenoweth; Alan Cumming

Highlights
- Most wins: The Curious Incident of the Dog in the Night-Time and Fun Home (5)
- Most nominations: An American in Paris and Fun Home (12)
- Website: tonyawards.com

Television/radio coverage
- Network: CBS
- Viewership: 6.4 million
- Produced by: Ricky Kirshner; Glenn Weiss
- Directed by: Glenn Weiss

The 69th Annual Tony Awards were held on June 7, 2015, to recognize achievement in Broadway productions during the 2014–15 season. The ceremony was held at Radio City Music Hall in New York City and broadcast live by CBS. Kristin Chenoweth and Alan Cumming hosted the ceremony.

Of the ceremony's most winning productions, The Curious Incident of the Dog in the Night-Time and Fun Home each won five Tony Awards in the play and musical categories, respectively. Both An American in Paris and the Lincoln Center revival of The King and I took home four Tony Awards.

== Eligibility ==
Shows that opened on Broadway during the 2014–15 season before April 23, 2015 were eligible for consideration.

Original plays

- Airline Highway
- The Audience
- Constellations
- The Country House
- The Curious Incident of the Dog in the Night-Time
- Disgraced
- Fish in the Dark
- Hand to God
- Living on Love
- The River
- Wolf Hall Parts One & Two

Original musicals

- An American in Paris
- Doctor Zhivago
- Finding Neverland
- Fun Home
- Holler If Ya Hear Me
- Honeymoon in Vegas
- It Shoulda Been You
- The Last Ship
- Something Rotten!
- The Visit

Play revivals

- A Delicate Balance
- The Elephant Man
- The Heidi Chronicles
- It's Only a Play
- Love Letters
- The Real Thing
- Skylight
- This Is Our Youth
- You Can't Take It with You

Musical revivals

- Gigi
- The King and I
- On the Town
- On the Twentieth Century
- Side Show

== Awards events ==
=== Nominations ===
The Tony Award nominations were announced on April 28, 2015 by Mary-Louise Parker and Bruce Willis. The musicals An American in Paris and Fun Home had the most nominations with 12, followed by Something Rotten! with 10, the revival of The King and I with 9 and Wolf Hall Parts One & Two with 8.

=== Other events ===
This is the first year that a new Tony Award was given for Excellence in Theatre Education (presented by Carnegie Mellon University). The award was presented to an educator who demonstrates "a positive impact on the lives of students, advancing the theatre profession and a commitment to excellence."

This year, the number of nominees in several categories may be increased, depending upon the number of eligible candidates. This change affects performance categories, Best Direction of both plays and musicals, and Best Choreography.

== Ceremony ==
The Creative Arts Awards portion of the awards ceremony was hosted by Jessie Mueller and James Monroe Iglehart. The Creative Arts Awards usually include Best Lighting Design of a Play, Best Lighting Design of a Musical, Best Costume Design of a Play, Best Costume Design of a Musical, Best Orchestrations.

There were performances at the awards ceremony from musicals which have been nominated for a Tony Award, and those which have not been nominated, including: An American in Paris, The King and I, On the Town, On the Twentieth Century, The Visit, Fun Home, Something Rotten!, It Shoulda Been You, Finding Neverland and Gigi.

=== Presenters ===
The presenters included:

- Jason Alexander
- Rose Byrne
- Bobby Cannavale
- Anna Chlumsky
- Bradley Cooper
- Harry Connick, Jr.
- Misty Copeland
- Bryan Cranston
- Larry David
- Taye Diggs
- Sutton Foster
- Jennifer Grey
- Joel Grey
- Neil Patrick Harris
- Marg Helgenberger
- Dulé Hill
- Nick Jonas
- Kiesza
- Judith Light
- Jennifer Lopez
- Patina Miller
- Joe Manganiello
- Debra Messing
- Jennifer Nettles
- Jim Parsons
- Bernadette Peters
- David Hyde Pierce
- Phylicia Rashad
- Thomas Sadoski
- Taylor Schilling
- Amanda Seyfried
- Sting
- Corey Stoll
- Kiefer Sutherland
- Ashley Tisdale
- Tommy Tune
- Rita Wilson

== Non-competitive awards ==
Tommy Tune received the Lifetime Achievement Award. The Tony Honors for Excellence in Theatre award recipients are: Adrian Bryan-Brown (press agent), Gene O'Donovan (Hudson Scenic Studio founder), and Arnold Abramson (scenery designer and painter). The Cleveland Play House received the Regional Theatre Tony Award. John Cameron Mitchell received the Special Tony Award for his return to Hedwig and the Angry Inch. Stephen Schwartz was given the Isabelle Stevenson Award. The new education award was presented to Corey Mitchell, Performing Arts Teacher and Theatre Director, Northwest School of the Arts, Charlotte, North Carolina.

== Winners and nominees ==
Best Play	Best Musical
The Curious Incident of the Dog in the Night-Time – Simon Stephens; Disgraced – Ayad Akhtar; Hand to God – Robert Askins; Wolf Hall Parts One & Two – Mike Poulton	Fun Home; An American in Paris; Something Rotten!; The Visit
Best Revival of a Play	Best Revival of a Musical
Skylight; The Elephant Man; This Is Our Youth; You Can't Take It with You	The King and I; On the Town; On the Twentieth Century
Best Performance by a Leading Actor in a Play	Best Performance by a Leading Actress in a Play
Alex Sharp – The Curious Incident of the Dog in the Night-Time as Christopher Boone; Steven Boyer – Hand to God as Jason/Tyrone; Bradley Cooper – The Elephant Man as John Merrick; Ben Miles – Wolf Hall Parts One & Two as Thomas Cromwell; Bill Nighy – Skylight as Tom Sergeant	Helen Mirren – The Audience as Queen Elizabeth II; Geneva Carr – Hand to God as Margery; Elisabeth Moss – The Heidi Chronicles as Heidi Holland; Carey Mulligan – Skylight as Kyra Hollis; Ruth Wilson – Constellations as Marianne
Best Performance by a Leading Actor in a Musical	Best Performance by a Leading Actress in a Musical
Michael Cerveris – Fun Home as Bruce Bechdel; Robert Fairchild – An American in Paris as Jerry Mulligan; Brian d'Arcy James – Something Rotten! as Nick Bottom; Ken Watanabe – The King and I as The King of Siam; Tony Yazbeck – On the Town as Gabey	Kelli O'Hara – The King and I as Anna Leonowens; Kristin Chenoweth – On the Twentieth Century as Lily Garland; Leanne Cope – An American in Paris as Lise Dassin; Beth Malone – Fun Home as Alison Bechdel; Chita Rivera – The Visit as Claire Zachannassian
Best Performance by a Featured Actor in a Play	Best Performance by a Featured Actress in a Play
Richard McCabe – The Audience as PM Harold Wilson; Matthew Beard – Skylight as Edward Sergeant; K. Todd Freeman – Airline Highway as Sissy Na Na; Alessandro Nivola – The Elephant Man as Frederick Treves; Nathaniel Parker – Wolf Hall Parts One & Two as Henry VIII; Micah Stock – It's Only a Play as Gus P. Head	Annaleigh Ashford – You Can't Take It With You as Essie Carmichael; Patricia Clarkson – The Elephant Man as Madge Kendal; Lydia Leonard – Wolf Hall Parts One & Two as Anne Boleyn; Sarah Stiles – Hand to God as Jessica; Julie White – Airline Highway as Tanya
Best Performance by a Featured Actor in a Musical	Best Performance by a Featured Actress in a Musical
Christian Borle – Something Rotten! as The Bard; Andy Karl – On the Twentieth Century as Bruce Granit; Brad Oscar – Something Rotten! as Nostradamus; Brandon Uranowitz – An American in Paris as Adam Hochberg; Max von Essen – An American in Paris as Henri Baurel	Ruthie Ann Miles – The King and I as Lady Thiang; Victoria Clark – Gigi as Mamita; Judy Kuhn – Fun Home as Helen Bechdel; Sydney Lucas – Fun Home as Small Alison; Emily Skeggs – Fun Home as Medium Alison
Best Book of a Musical	Best Original Score (Music and/or Lyrics) Written for the Theatre
Fun Home – Lisa Kron; An American in Paris – Craig Lucas; Something Rotten! – Karey Kirkpatrick and John O'Farrell; The Visit – Terrence McNally	Fun Home – Jeanine Tesori (music) and Lisa Kron (lyrics); The Last Ship – Sting (music and lyrics); Something Rotten! – Wayne Kirkpatrick (music and lyrics) and Karey Kirkpatrick (music and lyrics); The Visit – John Kander (music) and Fred Ebb (lyrics); This was the first time an all-female team won in this category.
Best Scenic Design of a Play	Best Scenic Design of a Musical
Bunny Christie and Finn Ross – The Curious Incident of the Dog in the Night-Time; Bob Crowley – Skylight; Christopher Oram – Wolf Hall Parts One & Two; David Rockwell – You Can't Take It with You	Bob Crowley and 59 Productions – An American in Paris; David Rockwell – On the Twentieth Century; Michael Yeargan – The King and I; David Zinn – Fun Home
Best Costume Design of a Play	Best Costume Design of a Musical
Christopher Oram – Wolf Hall Parts One & Two; Bob Crowley – The Audience; Jane Greenwood – You Can't Take It with You; David Zinn – Airline Highway	Catherine Zuber – The King and I; Gregg Barnes – Something Rotten!; Bob Crowley – An American in Paris; William Ivey Long – On the Twentieth Century
Best Lighting Design of a Play	Best Lighting Design of a Musical
Paule Constable – The Curious Incident of the Dog in the Night-Time; Paule Constable and David Plater – Wolf Hall Parts One & Two; Natasha Katz – Skylight; Japhy Weideman – Airline Highway	Natasha Katz – An American in Paris; Donald Holder – The King and I; Ben Stanton – Fun Home; Japhy Weideman – The Visit
Best Direction of a Play	Best Direction of a Musical
Marianne Elliott – The Curious Incident of the Dog in the Night-Time; Stephen Daldry – Skylight; Scott Ellis – You Can't Take It With You; Jeremy Herrin – Wolf Hall Parts One & Two; Moritz von Stuelpnagel – Hand to God	Sam Gold – Fun Home; Casey Nicholaw – Something Rotten!; John Rando – On the Town; Bartlett Sher – The King and I; Christopher Wheeldon – An American in Paris
Best Choreography	Best Orchestrations
Christopher Wheeldon – An American in Paris; Joshua Bergasse – On the Town; Christopher Gattelli – The King and I; Scott Graham and Steven Hoggett – The Curious Incident of the Dog in the Night-Time; Casey Nicholaw – Something Rotten!	Christopher Austin, Don Sebesky and Bill Elliot – An American in Paris; John Clancy – Fun Home; Larry Hochman – Something Rotten!; Rob Mathes – The Last Ship

=== Awards and nominations per production ===
Production	Nominations	Awards
Fun Home	12	5
An American in Paris	12	4
Something Rotten!	10	1
The King and I	9	4
Wolf Hall Parts One & Two	8	1
Skylight	7	1
The Curious Incident of the Dog in the Night-Time	6	5
You Can't Take It With You	5	1
Hand to God	5	0
The Visit	5	0
On the Twentieth Century	5	0
Airline Highway	4	0
The Elephant Man	4	0
On the Town	4	0
The Audience	3	2
The Last Ship	2	0
Constellations	1	0
Disgraced	1	0
Gigi	1	0
The Heidi Chronicles	1	0
It's Only a Play	1	0
This Is Our Youth	1	0

==== Individuals with multiple nominations ====
- 4: Bob Crowley
- 2: Paule Constable, Natasha Katz, Lisa Kron, Japhy Weideman

== In Memoriam ==
During the tribute Josh Groban sang the song "You'll Never Walk Alone" from the musical Carousel.

- Jayne Meadows Allen
- Lauren Bacall
- Polly Bergen
- Bunny Briggs
- Stanley Chase
- B.J. Crosby
- Ruby Dee
- Eugene Louis 'Luigi' Faccuito
- James Garner
- Gerry Goffin
- Carole L. Haber
- Joseph P. Harris
- Edward Herrmann
- Geoffrey Holder
- Louis Jourdan
- Charles Keating
- Robert H. Livingston
- Brian Macdonald
- Geraldine McEwan
- Anne Meara
- Barry Moss
- Rosemary Murphy
- Peter Neufeld
- Mike Nichols
- Leonard Nimoy
- Joan Rivers
- Mary Rodgers
- Julius Rudel
- Donald Saddler
- Herb Schapiro
- Gene Saks
- Richard Seader
- Donald Sinden
- Elaine Stritch
- Marian Seldes
- Andrea "Spook" Testani
- Jay Thompson
- Voytek
- Eli Wallach
- Robin Williams
- Elizabeth Wilson
- Julie Wilson

== See also ==
- Drama Desk Awards
- 2015 Laurence Olivier Awards – equivalent awards for West End theatre productions
- Obie Award
- New York Drama Critics' Circle
- Theatre World Award
- Lucille Lortel Awards
