= Tony Award for Best Costume Design in a Play =

Award for Theatrical costume design

Tony Award for Best Costume Design of a Play
- Awarded for: Best Costume Design of a Play
- Location: United States New York City
- Presented by: American Theatre Wing The Broadway League
- Currently held by: Jeff Mahshie for Fallen Angels (2026)
- Website: TonyAwards.com

Tony Award for Best Costume Design in a Play is an award for outstanding costume design of a play. The award was first presented in 1961 after the category of Best Costume Design was divided into Costume Design in a Play and Costume Design in a Musical with each genre receiving its own award.

== Winners and nominees ==
indicates the winner

=== 1960s ===
Year	Production	Nominees
1961 (15th)
1961 (15th)	Becket	Motley Theatre Design Group
1961 (15th)	All the Way Home	Raymond Sovey
1961 (15th)	The Devil's Advocate	Theoni V. Aldredge

=== 2000s ===
Year	Production	Nominees
2005 (59th)
2005 (59th)	The Rivals	Jess Goldstein
2005 (59th)	Gem of the Ocean	Constanza Romero
2005 (59th)	A Streetcar Named Desire	William Ivey Long
2005 (59th)	Who's Afraid of Virginia Woolf?	Jane Greenwood
2006 (60th)
2006 (60th)	Awake and Sing!	Catherine Zuber
2006 (60th)	The Constant Wife	Michael Krass
2006 (60th)	Seascape	Catherine Zuber
2006 (60th)	A Touch of the Poet	Santo Loquasto
2007 (61st)
2007 (61st)	The Coast of Utopia	Catherine Zuber
2007 (61st)	Coram Boy	Ti Green and Melly Still
2007 (61st)	Heartbreak House	Jane Greenwood
2007 (61st)	Inherit the Wind	Santo Loquasto
2008 (62nd)
2008 (62nd)	Les Liaisons Dangereuses	Katrina Lindsay
2008 (62nd)	Boeing-Boeing	Rob Howell
2008 (62nd)	Cyrano de Bergerac	Gregory Gale
2008 (62nd)	The 39 Steps	Peter McKintosh
2009 (63rd)
2009 (63rd)	Mary Stuart	Anthony Ward
2009 (63rd)	Blithe Spirit	Martin Pakledinaz
2009 (63rd)	Exit the King	Dale Ferguson
2009 (63rd)	Waiting for Godot	Jane Greenwood

=== 2010s ===
Year	Production	Nominees
2010 (64th)
2010 (64th)	The Royal Family	Catherine Zuber
2010 (64th)	Fences	Constanza Romero
2010 (64th)	In the Next Room (or The Vibrator Play)	David Zinn
2010 (64th)	Lend Me a Tenor	Martin Pakledinaz
2011 (65th)
2011 (65th)	The Importance of Being Earnest	Desmond Heeley
2011 (65th)	La Bête	Mark Thompson
2011 (65th)	Born Yesterday	Catherine Zuber
2011 (65th)	The Merchant of Venice	Jess Goldstein
2012 (66th)
2012 (66th)	Peter and the Starcatcher	Paloma Young
2012 (66th)	Don't Dress for Dinner	William Ivey Long
2012 (66th)	One Man, Two Guvnors	Mark Thompson
2012 (66th)	A Streetcar Named Desire	Paul Tazewell
2013 (67th)
2013 (67th)	The Nance	Ann Roth
2013 (67th)	Cyrano de Bergerac	Soutra Gilmour
2013 (67th)	Golden Boy	Catherine Zuber
2013 (67th)	The Heiress	Albert Wolsky
2014 (68th)
2014 (68th)	Twelfth Night	Jenny Tiramani
2014 (68th)	Act One	Jane Greenwood
2014 (68th)	Casa Valentina	Rita Ryack
2014 (68th)	Machinal	Michael Krass
2015 (69th)
2015 (69th)	Wolf Hall Parts One & Two	Christopher Oram
2015 (69th)	Airline Highway	David Zinn
2015 (69th)	The Audience	Bob Crowley
2015 (69th)	You Can't Take It with You	Jane Greenwood
2016 (70th)
2016 (70th)	Eclipsed	Clint Ramos
2016 (70th)	King Charles III	Tom Scutt
2016 (70th)	Long Day's Journey into Night	Jane Greenwood
2016 (70th)	Noises Off	Michael Krass
2017 (71st)
2017 (71st)	The Little Foxes	Jane Greenwood
2017 (71st)	A Doll's House, Part 2	David Zinn
2017 (71st)	Jitney	Toni-Leslie James
2017 (71st)	Present Laughter	Susan Hilferty
2018 (72nd)
2018 (72nd)	Harry Potter and the Cursed Child	Katrina Lindsay
2018 (72nd)	Angels in America	Nicky Gillibrand
2018 (72nd)	Farinelli and the King	Jonathan Fensom
2018 (72nd)	The Iceman Cometh	Ann Roth
2018 (72nd)	Three Tall Women	Ann Roth
2019 (73rd)
2019 (73rd)	The Ferryman	Rob Howell
2019 (73rd)	Bernhardt/Hamlet	Toni-Leslie James
2019 (73rd)	Gary: A Sequel to Titus Andronicus	Ann Roth
2019 (73rd)	To Kill a Mockingbird	Ann Roth
2019 (73rd)	Torch Song	Clint Ramos

=== 2020s ===
Year	Production	Nominees
2020 (74th)
2020 (74th)	A Christmas Carol	Rob Howell
2020 (74th)	The Inheritance	Bob Crowley
2020 (74th)	The Rose Tattoo	Clint Ramos
2020 (74th)	Slave Play	Dede Ayite
2020 (74th)	A Soldier's Play	Dede Ayite
2022 (75th)
2022 (75th)	The Skin of Our Teeth	Montana Levi Blanco
2022 (75th)	Clyde's	Jennifer Moeller
2022 (75th)	for colored girls who have considered suicide / when the rainbow is enuf	Sarafina Bush
2022 (75th)	Neil Simon's Plaza Suite	Jane Greenwood
2022 (75th)	Trouble in Mind	Emilio Sosa
2023 (76th)
2023 (76th)	Leopoldstadt	Brigitte Reiffenstuel
2023 (76th)	Ain't No Mo'	Emilio Sosa
2023 (76th)	Fat Ham	Dominique Fawn Hill
2023 (76th)	Good Night, Oscar	Emilio Sosa
2023 (76th)	Life of Pi	Tim Hatley, Nick Barnes and Finn Caldwell
2024 (77th)
2024 (77th)	Jaja's African Hair Braiding	Dede Ayite
2024 (77th)	Appropriate	Dede Ayite
2024 (77th)	An Enemy of the People	David Zinn
2024 (77th)	Purlie Victorious: A Non-Confederate Romp through the Cotton Patch	Emilio Sosa
2024 (77th)	Stereophonic	Enver Chakartash
2025 (78th)
2025 (78th)	The Picture of Dorian Gray	Marg Horwell
2025 (78th)	Good Night, and Good Luck	Brenda Abbandandolo
2025 (78th)	The Hills of California	Rob Howell
2025 (78th)	Oh, Mary!	Holly Pierson
2025 (78th)	Stranger Things: The First Shadow	Brigitte Reiffenstuel
2026 (79th)
2026 (79th)	Fallen Angels	Jeff Mahshie
2026 (79th)	The Balusters	Emilio Sosa
2026 (79th)	Dog Day Afternoon	Brenda Abbandandolo
2026 (79th)	Joe Turner's Come and Gone	Paul Tazewell
2026 (79th)	Liberation	Qween Jean

== Multiple wins ==
This also includes wins in the former Best Costume Design category

3 wins

- Catherine Zuber

2 wins

- Desmond Heeley
- Rob Howell
- Katrina Lindsay
- Motley Theatre Design Group

== Multiple nominations ==
This also includes nominations in the former Best Costume Design category

8 nominations

- Jane Greenwood

6 nominations

- Catherine Zuber

5 nominations

- Ann Roth
- Emilio Sosa

4 nominations

- Dede Ayite
- Rob Howell
- David Zinn

3 nominations

- Michael Krass
- Clint Ramos

2 nominations

- Brenda Abbandandolo
- Bob Crowley
- Jess Goldstein
- Toni-Leslie James
- Katrina Lindsay
- William Ivey Long
- Santo Loquasto
- Martin Pakledinaz
- Constanza Romero
- Brigitte Reiffenstuel
- Paul Tazewell
- Mark Thompson

== See also ==
- Tony Award for Best Costume Design in a Musical
- Drama Desk Award for Outstanding Costume Design of a Play
- Laurence Olivier Award for Best Costume Design
- List of Tony Award-nominated productions
