= Leopoldstadt (play) =

2020 play by Tom Stoppard

- Original language: English
- Written by: Tom Stoppard
- Subject: History, Jewish life, The Holocaust, antisemitism
- Genre: Drama
- Setting: Vienna during first half of the 20th century from 1899 to 1955

Premiere
- Date: 25 January 2020
- Place: Wyndham's Theatre; London

Leopoldstadt is the final stage play written by British playwright Sir Tom Stoppard. The original production premiered on 25 January 2020 at Wyndham's Theatre in London's West End. The play is set among the wealthy Jewish community in Vienna, in the first half of the 20th century and follows the lives of "a prosperous Jewish family who had fled the pogroms in the East".

According to Stoppard, the play "took a year to write, but the gestation was much longer. Quite a lot of it is personal to me, but I made it about a Viennese family so that it wouldn't seem to be about me." All four of Stoppard's grandparents were Jews murdered by Nazis in concentration camps. On 2 October 2022, the New York production opened on Broadway at the Longacre Theatre with Patrick Marber directing.

A National Theatre Live recording was screened in over 380 cinemas on 27 January (Holocaust Memorial Day) 2022 and topped that night's UK and Ireland box office. The play's second preview performance had also taken place on Holocaust Memorial Day, in 2020, when each audience member was given a memorial candle as they left the theatre.

== Synopsis ==
Leopoldstadt frames the narrative of a Jewish family in Vienna over a period of some 50 years. The main set is the drawing room of a wealthy family. There are five acts occurring in the years 1899, 1900, 1924, 1938 and 1955.

- 1899: the family gathers for Christmas, discussing ideas ranging from Theodore Herzl's Zionism to Jewish and Viennese arts and culture. Family members have integrated well with Viennese society, and enjoy their rights and civil liberties. Hanna asks Gretl to chaperone her on a date with a non-Jewish cavalry officer, Fritz. Hermann’s nephew, Pauli, expresses an interest in becoming a soldier.
- 1900: Gretl and Fritz strike up an affair, which Gretl eventually ends. Hermann gains knowledge of this, but ultimately dismisses Gretl's infidelity. The family gather for Passover Seder, celebrating the birth of Hermann’s niece, Nellie.
- 1924: Jacob, the son of Hermann and Gretl, fought in World War I alongside Pauli. Pauli was killed in battle; Jacob survived but lost an eye and has one useless arm. The family gather for a bris ceremony. This act explores the impacts of the Great War and the rise of Bolshevism. Fearing for the worst, Hermann meets with a banker to discuss transferring the family business to Jacob.
- 1938: the year of Anschluss. The family are gathered, with the company of a British journalist who is engaged to one of the girls in the family. The family discuss escape plans, including visas to England. The Nazis enter the property, harassing the family and seizing their belongings. The family's home is requisitioned by the Nazis and the family must leave to be transported the following day. Hermann is forced to sign the family business away to the Nazis, but Jacob retains legal ownership. It is revealed that Jacob is the legal son of Gretl and Fritz; Hermann planned and acknowledged the affair so that Jacob would not face antisemitism since he would be legally recorded as a gentile.
- 1955: the survivors of the Holocaust gather in the family home. Only three family members survived: Leo, who successfully gained a British visa and assimilated into British culture; Rosa, who moved to New York before the Holocaust; and Nathan, who survived Auschwitz. Leo has no memory of his life in Vienna as a Jew; the family painfully recollect their memories and acknowledge their murdered family members.

== Background ==
Patrick Marber, who also worked with Stoppard on the revival of Travesties in London and New York, commented that "It's a big company play which as a director is incredibly exciting to do. It's got the lot." During rehearsals he "instituted a fabulous regime of lectures" given by cast members, allotting each a subject relevant to the play's themes to investigate.

== Production history ==
=== West End (2020–2021) ===
Leopoldstadt's original run at Wyndham's—which had no seat unsold at any performance—was interrupted by the COVID-19 pandemic, with the production temporarily shut down on 16 March 2020. On 25 October 2020 Leopoldstadt won the Olivier Award for Best New Play, and Adrian Scarborough won for Best Actor in a Supporting Role. After Covid restrictions were lifted in England the play re-opened and ran from 7 August to 30 October 2021.

Stoppard told BBC Radio 4 that Leopoldstadt may be his last play—though in October 2021 he acknowledged, in a CNN interview with Christiane Amanpour, that he was reconsidering: "I'm a playwright, by more than, as it were, labeling. I feel like somebody who writes plays while they're still alive."

The Wyndham's production's set design was by Richard Hudson, costumes by Brigitte Reiffenstuel, lighting by Neil Austin, sound and original music by Adam Cork and movement by EJ Boyle. Leopoldstadt is the sixth collaboration between Sonia Friedman Productions and Stoppard. The 41 actors performing in the 2020 production were cast by Amy Ball (adults) and Verity Naughton (children). The initial cast list was announced on 25 October 2019 and included Adrian Scarborough, Alexis Zegerman, Luke Thallon and Stoppard's son, Ed.

=== Broadway (2022–2023) ===
The play had its North American premiere on Broadway at the Longacre Theatre when it started previews on 14 September 2022 and opened on 2 October. Its originally intended North American premiere was to have taken place at the Princess of Wales Theatre in Toronto, for a seven-week engagement with the London cast, however it was announced that the run would no longer go ahead because of the COVID-19 pandemic. The theatre's owner, David Mirvish, said, "I'm not giving up on Leopoldstadt. I'm determined to present this magnificent play in Toronto sometime in the future when it is safe to do so." Originally scheduled to run through March 2023, the Broadway run was extended to July 2023. The production played its final performance on 2 July 2023.

=== Boston (2024) ===
A newly revised script premiered at the Huntington Theatre in Boston, from 12 September 2024 to 13 October 2024. Directed by Carey Perloff in collaboration with Shakespeare Theatre Company, D.C. Set design was by Ken MacDonald, costumes by Alex Jaeger, lighting by Robert Wierzel, sound and composition by Jane Shaw, projections by Yuki Izumihara, wigs and makeup by Tom Waston.

=== Washington DC (2024) ===
Following the run in Boston, the show moved on to the Shakespeare Theatre Company in Washington, D.C., from 30 November 2024 to 29 December 2024 at Sidney Harman Hall.

=== Non-English productions ===
A German-language production at the Theater in der Josefstadt in Vienna opened in 2022.

John Malkovich staged the first Latvian language production of the play at Dailes Theatre which opened on 15 September 2023 in Riga, Latvia. Malkovich, having previously acted on the same stage, was approached by the theater's director who inquired about his interest in directing a play. "We spoke about a number of plays, but he was most excited about doing Leopoldstadt. And since I'm someone who has spent a lot of time in Vienna, have worked there many times, and have spent a good deal of time reading and experiencing Viennese history and culture, it was quite a natural thing for me to do," Malkovich stated. On this production he worked with the Dailes Theatre repertoire company, but employed his own frequent collaborators Pierre-François Limbosch & Birgit Hutter in the art department.

The play was staged in Israel at the Habima Theater in Tel Aviv, where it premiered on 1 April 2023. The translation belonged to Dori Parnes and the stage director was Ilan Ronen.

== Notable casts ==
Character	London	Broadway
Character	2020	2022
1899
Grandma Emilia Merz	Caroline Gruber	Betsy Aidem
Hermann Merz	Adrian Scarborough	David Krumholtz
Eva Merz Jakobovicz	Alexis Zegerman	Caissie Levy
Gretl Merz	Faye Castelow	Faye Castelow
Ludwig Jakobovicz	Ed Stoppard/Sebastian Armesto	Brandon Uranowitz
Wilma Jakobovicz Kloster	Clara Francis	Jenna Augen
Ernst Kloster	Aaron Neil	Aaron Neil
Hanna Jakobovicz Zenner	Dorothea Myer-Bennett	Colleen Litchfield
Pauli Jakobovicz	Ilan Galkoff	Drew Squire
Young Jacob Merz	Daniel Lawson; Jarlan Bogolubov; Ramsay Robertson	Joshua Satine; Aaron Shuf
Young Sally Kloster	Libby Lewis; Maya Larholm; Beatrice Rapstone	Reese Bogin; Romy Fay
Young Rosa Kloster	Tamar Laniado; Olivia Festinger; Chloe Raphael	Pearl Scarlett Gold; Ava Michele Hyl
Poldi	Sadie Shimmin	Gina Ferrall
Jana	Natalie Law	Sara Topham
Hilde	Felicity Davidson	Eden Epstein
1900
Fritz	Luke Thallon	Arty Froushan
1924
Hermine Zenner Floge	Yasmin Paige	Eden Epstein
Jacob Merz	Sebastian Armesto	Seth Numrich
Nellie Jakobovicz Rosenbaum	Eleanor Wyld	Tedra Millan; Charlotte Graham
Sally Kloster Fischbein	Avye Leventis	Sara Topham
Rosa Kloster	Jenna Augen	Jenna Augen
Aaron Rosenbaum	Griffin Stevens	Jesse Aaronson
Kurt Zenner	Alexander Newland	Daniel Cantor
Zac Fischbein	Joe Coen	Matt Harrington
Otto Floge	Noof McEwan	Japhet Balaban
Mohel	Jake Neads	Daniel Cantor
1938
Percy Chamberlain	Sam Hoare	Seth Numrich
Young Leo Rosenbaum	Toby Cohen; Jack Meredith; Joshua Schneider	Michael Deaner; Wesley Holloway; Cody Braverman
Young Nathan Fischbein	Rhys Bailey	Anthony Rosenthal
Mimi Fischbein	Libby Lewis; Maya Larholm; Beatrice Rapstone	Reese Bogin; Romy Fay
Bella Fischbein	Tamar Laniado; Olivia Festinger; Chloe Raphael	Pearl Scarlett Gold; Ava Michele Hyl
Heini Floge	Zachary Cohen; Louis Levy; Montague Rapstone	Max Ryan Burach; Calvin James Davis; Jaxon Cain Grundleger; Remy Cohen
Umzugshauptmannsleiter Schmidt	Mark Edel-Hunt	Corey Brill
Policemen	Joe Coen; Jake Neads	Jesse Aaronson; Matt Harrington
1955
Rosa Kloster	Jenna Augen	Jenna Augen
Nathan Fischbein	Sebastian Armesto	Brandon Uranowitz
Leo Chamberlain	Luke Thallon	Arty Froushan

After the Broadway production was extended, Joshua Malina took over the role of Hermann Merz from March 2023 to July 2023.

== Reception ==
The play has received critical acclaim. Theatre critic and journalist Dominic Cavendish wrote in The Telegraph, "So here it is. Tom Stoppard's last play. Very possibly. Britain's greatest living dramatist has said that Leopoldstadt is likely to be the end of the road – given his age (82) and how long it takes him to write. Almost every major work he has produced since he burst onto the scene with his Hamlet spin-off Rosencrantz and Guildenstern Are Dead in 1966 has been met with high anticipation."

Whilst Lloyd Evans wrote in The Spectator, "History will record Leopoldstadt as Tom Stoppard's Schindler's List. His brilliant tragic-comic play opens in the Jewish quarter of Vienna in 1899. We meet a family of intellectuals and businessmen who are celebrating their very first Christmas. (...) At press night, the critics were busy scribbling one-liners which are destined to reach the dictionary of quotations. 'Why do Jews have to choose between pushy and humble?' 'Today's modern is tomorrow's nostalgia: we missed Mahler when we heard Schoenberg.'"

Greg Evans wrote in Deadline that with Leopoldstadt Stoppard delivered "a late career masterpiece." Evans added that "any summary of scenes and timeline descriptions of Leopoldstadt can't begin to convey the richness of Stoppard's work," noting that "mathematics, not surprisingly, comes into play, as it so often does with Stoppard, but so too does Zionism and modern art and so many other aspects of 20th Century political history that Leopoldstadt can at times seem like a right and proper companion piece to Ken Burns' wonderful The U.S. and the Holocaust documentary."

In 2021, Alan Yentob interviewed Stoppard about the play and his life for an episode of Imagine.

== Adaptations ==
A live performance of the play was recorded towards the end of its second run and was screened as a film in UK cinemas (and some international locations) on 27 January 2022 (Holocaust Memorial Day) through National Theatre Live.

In 2023 Deadline reported that a television version of the play was in early discussions.

== Awards and nominations ==
=== Original West End production ===
Year	Award	Category	Nominee	Result
2020	Laurence Olivier Award	Best New Play		Won
2020	Laurence Olivier Award	Best Actor in a Supporting Role	Adrian Scarborough	Won

=== Original Broadway production ===
Year	Award	Category	Nominee	Result
2023	Tony Awards	Best Play		Won
2023	Tony Awards	Best Direction of a Play	Patrick Marber	Won
2023	Tony Awards	Best Featured Actor in a Play	Brandon Uranowitz	Won
2023	Tony Awards	Best Scenic Design of a Play	Richard Hudson	Nominated
2023	Tony Awards	Best Costume Design of a Play	Brigitte Reiffenstuel	Won
2023	Tony Awards	Best Lighting Design of a Play	Neil Austin	Nominated
2023	Drama Desk Awards	Outstanding Play		Won
2023	Drama Desk Awards	Outstanding Featured Performer in a Play	Brandon Uranowitz	Won
2023	Drama League Awards	Outstanding Production of a Play		Won
2023	Drama League Awards	Distinguished Performance	David Krumholtz	Nominated
2023	Outer Critics Circle Awards	Outstanding New Broadway Play		Won
2023	Outer Critics Circle Awards	Outstanding Direction of a Play	Patrick Marber	Won
2023	Outer Critics Circle Awards	Outstanding Featured Performer in a Broadway Play	Brandon Uranowitz	Won
2023	Outer Critics Circle Awards	Outstanding Costume Design	Brigitte Reiffenstuel	Nominated
2023	Outer Critics Circle Awards	Outstanding Lighting Design	Neil Austin	Nominated
2023	Outer Critics Circle Awards	Outstanding Projection Design	Isaac Madge	Nominated
2023	New York Drama Critics' Circle Awards	Best Foreign Play	Tom Stoppard	Won
