= Matthew Harrington =

Matthew Harrington may refer to:

- Matthew T. Harrington, American diplomat
- Matthew Harrington (politician), American politician from Maine
- Matt Harrington (baseball), American baseball player
- Matt Harrington (actor), American stage actor
