= Rob Fisher (conductor) =

American conductor

Rob Fisher is an American music director, conductor, arranger and pianist. He was the founding music director and conductor of the New York City Center Encores! series from 1994 to 2005. He is the leader of the Coffee Club Orchestra, which was the house band for Garrison Keillor’s radio broadcasts from 1989 to 1993.

== Early career and education ==
Fisher grew up in Norfolk, Virginia, where he began taking piano lessons at age 6. He received a BA from Duke University and an MA in piano performance from American University. In 2016, Fisher received an Honorary Doctorate of Music from Mansfield University.

After Fisher arrived in New York City as the onstage pianist for the musical revue A History of the American Film in 1978, he worked on the Berkshire Theatre Festival’s production of the 1933 George and Ira Gershwin musical Let 'Em Eat Cake—the first-ever revival of the piece. Later that year, he was a guest pianist for "By Ira... By George," a gala benefit concert at Carnegie Hall celebrating the 80th Anniversary of the birth of George Gershwin that featured Ginger Rogers, Cab Calloway, Barbara Cook, Michael Feinstein and others.

After several years of regional theater and Broadway National tours, in 1987 Fisher was enlisted to prepare the musical artists for the international Gershwin Celebration at the Brooklyn Academy of Music, which featured performers such as Leonard Bernstein, Mikhail Baryshnikov, Bob Dylan. This led to his conducting concert productions the Gershwins' Of Thee I Sing and Let ‘Em Eat Cake under the guidance of noted conductor Michael Tilson Thomas, who was the music director of the entire three-week celebration. These productions continued a professional association with the works of George Gershwin, one further cemented in the late 1990s when Fisher served as the artistic advisor of Carnegie Hall's two-year Gershwin Centennial Celebration, and most recently when he supervised the creation of the score for the Broadway musical An American in Paris.

== Encores! Great American Musicals in Concert ==
An aficionado of the Great American Songbook and the Golden Age of musical theater, Fisher was pivotal in the 1994 founding of New York City Center's Encores! Great American Musicals in Concert, an annual series dedicated to presenting the complete scores of rarely-heard musicals. The series was praised widely and was awarded the Lucille Lortel Award for Off-Broadway Special Achievement in 1995, the Jujamcyn Theater Award in 1997, several Outer Critics Circle Awards, and a Tony Honor for Excellence in Theatre in 2000. For his contributions to Encores!, Fisher himself received the 1997 Lucille Lortel Award for Outstanding Special Achievement. Fisher has made numerous recordings for Encores!, including the Grammy Award-winning Chicago cast recording.

Fisher served as music director and conductor of Encores! from 1994 through 2005. He continues to be a regular guest music director for the series.

Several Encores! productions conducted by Fisher eventually transferred to Broadway for commercial productions. Most notable of these is Chicago, which has gone on to become Broadway's second longest running show as well as Broadway's longest running revival. Fisher remains supervising music director for Chicago productions worldwide.

== Concert and recording work ==
In addition to Fisher's work for theatrical productions, he is a frequent guest of orchestras across the United States, both as a conductor and as a piano soloist. With the New York Philharmonic, he conducted concert versions of Carousel (for which he received an Emmy nomination for Outstanding Musical Director) and My Fair Lady. With the Orchestra of St. Luke's, he led gala performances of Candide, Guys and Dolls, and The Sound of Music at Carnegie Hall. In 2001, he conducted the San Francisco Symphony in the Emmy-winning concert production of Sweeney Todd starring Patti LuPone and George Hearn, which was subsequently released on DVD.

Fisher conducted the New York Pops frequently between 2004 and 2008, frequently sharing concerts with Skitch Henderson as well as leading the orchestra for many holiday concerts and special events. Additionally, he has appeared with the Boston and Chicago Symphonies, the Philadelphia and Cleveland orchestras, the Los Angeles Philharmonic, and the San Francisco, Atlanta, Pittsburgh, Baltimore, and National symphonies. As a pianist, Fisher has been soloist for Gershwin's Rhapsody in Blue and Concerto in F with multiple orchestras across the country.

In addition to collaborating in concert with such artists as Renée Fleming, Kristin Chenoweth, Kelli O’Hara, Victoria Clark, Idina Menzel, Brian Stokes Mitchell, and David Hyde Pierce, he has conducted many engagements with Patti LuPone, including ones with the Pacific, Phoenix, Atlanta, Fort Worth, and Chicago symphonies.

He has recorded dozens of albums as conductor and music director, serving as producer of several of them—including the recent Original Broadway Cast Recording of An American in Paris, for which he received a Grammy-nomination as Producer. Most recently, Fisher was the music supervisor, conductor, and an arranger for Renée Fleming's 2018 album Broadway, produced by multiple Grammy-winning David Frost.

As an arranger, he has had choral arrangements published by Hal Leonard and has contributed vocal arrangements to numerous shows and recordings. For the opening night of Carnegie Hall's 2018-2019 season, he arranged a duet for Audra McDonald and Renée Fleming with the San Francisco Symphony and Michael Tilson Thomas.

From 1989 to 1993, Fisher was music director for Garrison Keillor's “American Radio Company,” leading the program's house band, the Coffee Club Orchestra. He remained a frequent guest on Keillor's “A Prairie Home Companion” until Keillor's retirement.

== Theater credits ==
=== Broadway ===
- Living on Love (2015) — music consultant and arranger
- An American in Paris (2015) — musical score adaptor, arranger, and supervisor
- Anything Goes (2011) — music supervisor and vocal arranger
- Hair (2009) — music supervisor
- The Apple Tree (2006) — music supervisor and vocal arranger
- Wonderful Town (2003) — music supervisor and vocal arranger
- Chicago (1996) — music director/conductor (and music supervisor for all productions worldwide)
- The Threepenny Opera (1989) — conductor
- Little Johnny Jones (1982) — vocal arranger
- A Day in Hollywood/A Night in the Ukraine (1980) — offstage pianist
- A History of the American Film (1978) — onstage pianist

=== Encores! ===
music director/conductor for all productions below

- 2019: I Married an Angel
- 2015: Lady, Be Good!
- 2013: On Your Toes
- 2010: Girl Crazy
- 2008: No, No, Nanette
- 2007: Face the Music
- 2005: A Tree Grows in Brooklyn • The Apple Tree
- 2004: Pardon My English • Bye Bye Birdie
- 2003: The New Moon • No Strings
- 2002: Carnival • Golden Boy • The Pajama Game
- 2001: A Connecticut Yankee • Bloomer Girl • Hair
- 2000: On a Clear Day You Can See Forever • Tenderloin • Wonderful Town
- 1999: Babes in Arms • Ziegfeld Follies of 1936
- 1998: Strike Up the Band • Li'l Abner • St. Louis Woman
- 1997: Sweet Adeline • Promises, Promises • The Boys from Syracuse
- 1996: Du Barry Was a Lady • One Touch of Venus • Chicago
- 1995: Call Me Madam • Out of This World • Pal Joey
- 1994: Fiorello! • Allegro • Lady in the Dark

=== Off-Broadway ===
- Hair (Delacorte Theater, 2008) — music supervisor
- Two Gentlemen of Verona (Delacorte Theater, 2005) — music supervisor
- Saturday Night (Second Stage Theater, 2000) — music director/conductor
- Snoopy (Lamb's Theatre, 1982) — conductor, pianist
- Trixie True, Teen Detective (Lucille Lortel Theatre, 1980) — music director, vocal arranger

== Discography ==
Year	Album/Artist	Role(s)	Label	Notes
2018	Broadway Renée Fleming	music supervisor, conductor	Decca Classics (Universal)	
2015	Lady, Be Good! Encores! Cast Recording featuring Tommy Tune, Patti Murin, and Danny Gardner	music director, conductor, producer	Ghostlight Records	
2015	An American in Paris Original Broadway Cast Recording featuring Robert Fairchild and Leanne Cope	score supervisor, arranger, producer	Masterworks Broadway	Grammy nomination
2013	Shout, Sister, Shout The DiGiallonardo Sisters	music director, piano, producer	CD Baby	
2013	Rappahannock County Original Cast Recording	music director, conductor	Naxos Records	
2011	Anything Goes Broadway Revival Cast Recording featuring Sutton Foster, Joel Grey, and Laura Osnes	music supervisor, vocal arranger, producer	Ghostlight Records	Grammy nomination
2010	On Broadway David Campbell	music director, conductor, producer	Columbia/Sony Music Entertainment Australia	
2007	Musical Fireworks The New York Pops	music director, conductor	Private release	
2007	Face the Music Encores! Cast Recording featuring Judy Kaye, Lee Wilkof, and Eddie Korbich	music director, conductor, vocal arrangements	DRG Records	
2004	The New Moon Encores! Cast Recording featuring Christiane Noll and Rod Gilfry	music director, conductor, associate producer	Ghostlight Records	
2004	Wonderful Town Broadway Revival Cast Recording featuring Donna Murphy, Jennifer Westfeldt, and Gregg Edelman	music director, conductor, associate producer	DRG Records	
2001	Ziegfeld Follies of 1936 Encores! Cast Recording featuring Christine Ebersole, Ruthie Henshall, Howard McGillin, Mary Testa, and Peter Scolari	music director, conductor, associate producer	Decca Broadway	
2001	George and Ira Gershwin's Tell Me More and Tip-Toes Studio Cast Recording featuring David Garrison, Christine Ebersole, Sally Mayes, Patrick Cassidy, Emily Loesser, Lewis J. Stadlen, Lee Wilkof, and Mark Baker	music director, conductor, piano, producer	New World Records	
2001	Let Yourself Go Kristin Chenoweth	music director, conductor	Sony Classical	
2000	Tenderloin Encores! Cast Recording featuring David Ogden Stiers, Patrick Wilson, and Debbie Gravitte	music director, conductor, co-producer	DRG Records	
2000	Saturday Night Original Off-Broadway Cast Recording	music director, conductor	Nonesuch Records	
1998	Babes in Arms Encores! Cast Recording	music director, conductor, associate producer	DRG Records	
1998	St. Louis Woman Encores! Cast Recording featuring Vanessa Williams	music director, conductor, associate producer	Mercury Records	
1997	The Boys from Syracuse Encores! Cast Recording	music director, conductor, associate producer	DRG Records	
1997	Chicago Broadway Revival Cast Recording featuring Ann Reinking, Bebe Neuwirth, James Naughton, and Joel Grey	music director, conductor	RCA Victor/BMG Classics	Grammy Award, Musical Show Recording
1996	Horrors! A Prairie Home Companion with Garrison Keillor	conductor, piano	HighBridge Productions	
1996	Nice Work If You Can Get It: Songs by the Gershwins Michael Feinstein	guest conductor	Atlantic Records	
1996	Louisiana Purchase Encores! Cast Recording	music director, conductor, associate producer	DRG Records	
1995	Manhattan Dream Tomoko Shibata	music director, conductor, piano	EMI Records	
1995	A Prairie Home Christmas with Garrison Keillor & Hundreds of Friends & Acquaintances	conductor	HighBridge Productions	
1995	Out of This World Encores! Cast Recording featuring Andrea Martin, Marin Mazzie, La Chanze, Ken Page, Gregg Edelman, Ernie Sabella, and Peter Scolari	music director, conductor, associate producer	DRG Records	
1995	Pal Joey Encores! Cast Recording featuring Patti LuPone, Peter Gallagher, and Bebe Neuwirth	music director, conductor, associate producer	DRG Records	
1995	Call Me Madam Encores! Cast Recording featuring Tyne Daly	music director, conductor, associate producer	DRG Records	
1994	A Prairie Home Companion 20th Anniversary Collection	piano	HighBridge Productions	
1992	Shaking the Blues Away Garrison Keillor with Rob Fisher and the Coffee Club Orchestra	conductor, piano, liner notes	Angel Records/EMI	
1990	Local Man Moves to the City Garrison Keillor with Rob Fisher and the Coffee Club Orchestra	conductor	HighBridge Productions	
1990	Garrison Keillor's American Radio Company: The First Season Garrison Keillor with Rob Fisher and the Coffee Club Orchestra	conductor	HighBridge Productions	
1987	George and Ira Gershwin's Of Thee I Sing and Let ’Em Eat Cake Studio Cast Recording featuring Maureen McGovern, Larry Kert, Jack Gilford, and Michael Tilson Thomas conducting the Orchestra of St. Luke's	associate music director	CBS Records	Grammy nomination
1980	A Day in Hollywood, a Night in the Ukraine Original Broadway Cast Recording	piano	DRG Records	
