= Constanza Romero =

American artist and costume designer (born 1958)

- Born: March 8, 1958 (age 68)
- Education: UC Santa Cruz, Yale School of Drama
- Occupations: Artist, costume designer
- Spouse: August Wilson (m. 1994; died 2005)
- Children: 1

Constanza Romero (born March 8, 1958) is an American artist and costume designer.

Romero's parents divorced in 1969. Her mother found a teaching job in Fresno, California, and moved there with Romero and her younger sister and two younger brothers. In 1972, her mother died of breast cancer, and the four children went to live with a maternal aunt and uncle near Fresno.

Romero met playwright August Wilson in 1990, when her Yale School of Drama teachers assigned her to design costumes for his play, The Piano Lesson. The couple married in 1994, and had one child, Azula Carmen Wilson. Her husband Wilson died in October 2005.

Romero has twice been nominated for a Tony Award for Best Costume Design of a Play (in 2005 and 2010, respectively).
