= Brenda Abbandandolo =

Costume designer

Brenda Abbandandolo is a costume designer working in film and theatre.

== Education ==
Abbandandolo received a bachelor's degree from Northeastern University and an MFA in costume design from NYU Tisch School of the Arts.

== Career ==
On Broadway, Abbandandolo has designed costumes for The Sign in Sidney Brustein's Window (2023), Mary Jane (2024), Good Night and Good Luck (2025), and Dog Day Afternoon (2026). For both Good Night and Good Luck and Dog Day Afternoon, Abbandandolo received nominations for the Tony Award for Best Costume Design of a Play.

Abbandandolo has costumed films including CODA, The Disaster Artist, and An American Pickle. From 2012 until 2015, she was an associate costume designer for Saturday Night Live.

== Filmography ==
=== Film ===
Year	Title	Director	Notes
2011	The Color of Time	Various	
2011	Black Dog Red Dog	Various	
2013	The Maid's Room	Michael Walker	
2015	I Am Michael	Justin Kelly	
2015	The Adderall Diaries	Pamela Romanowsky	
2016	Tallulah	Sian Heder	
2016	All We Had	Katie Holmes	
2017	The Disaster Artist	James Franco	
2018	Like Father	Lauren Miller Rogen	
2018	The Pretenders	James Franco	
2019	Joker	Todd Phillips	Background assistant costume designer; uncredited
2019	The Wolf Hour	A. Banks Griffin	
2020	An American Pickle	Brandon Trost	
2021	CODA	Sian Heder	
2021	Tick, Tick... Boom!	Lin-Manuel Miranda	Assistant costume designer
2022	Along for the Ride	Sofia Alvarez	
2023	About My Father	Laura Terruso	
2023	Quiz Lady	Jessica Yu	
2023	Nonnas	Stephen Chbosky	
2025	Easy's Waltz	Nic Pizzolatto	
