= Brandon Uranowitz =

American stage and television actor (born 1986)

- Uranowitz in 2026
- Born: Brandon Jacob Uranowitz; July 9, 1986 (age 40); Livingston, New Jersey, U.S.
- Education: New York University (BFA)
- Occupations: Actor; dancer; singer
- Years active: 1996–present
- Partner: Zachary Prince (2011–present)

Brandon Jacob Uranowitz (born July 9, 1986) is an American actor. He won the Tony Award for Best Featured Actor in a Play for Leopoldstadt (2022–23) and has also received Tony Award nominations for An American in Paris (2014–15), Falsettos (2016), Burn This (2019), and Ragtime (2025–26). His other credits include Baby, It's You! (2011), Prince of Broadway (2017), The Band's Visit (2018), and Assassins (2022).

== Early life and education ==
Uranowitz grew up in West Orange, New Jersey and attended the nearby Montclair Kimberley Academy. He is from a Jewish family and had a bar mitzvah.

He began performing at age six and studied at Performers Theatre Workshop. In the mid-1990s, he was a working child actor; professional roles included an ensemble member in Evita at the Paper Mill Playhouse (1996) and a swing in A Christmas Carol at Madison Square Garden. In 1997, he assumed the role of Little Boy in the world premiere of Ragtime in Toronto. He was also member of The Broadway Kids, a musical revue and recording project; he performed live off-Broadway and appears on the 1998 album The Broadway Kids Back on Broadway. Of Uranowitz's contribution as part of the ensemble cast, The New York Times wrote he "was a testament to youthful enthusiasm and lung power".

He attended New York University and graduated in 2008 with a degree in theater arts from their Tisch School of the Arts.

== Career ==
=== 2006–2013: Early career and Broadway debut ===
Uranowitz resumed his acting career while training at NYU; early on, he held the roles of Richard in Richard III and the King of France in All's Well That Ends Well at Classical Studio, Cardinal Bellarmin in Galileo at The Skirball Center (2007), and Dante in Only Children at The Abe Burrows Theatre.

Following graduation, he played the role of Feste in Twelfth Night at the Kirk Theatre off-Broadway (2009) and the role of Eugene in Brighton Beach Memoirs / Broadway Bound in 2010 at the Old Globe Theatre in San Diego. Of Uranowitz's appearance as Feste in Twelfth Night, MusicOMH wrote "Uranowitz rocks it... ...playing the fool character with restrained glee," PlayShakespeare.com wrote, "Brandon Uranowitz' effortless command of the language and, again, his willingness to explore his characters' depth makes him absolutely spellbinding." For his performance, Uranowitz received a PlayShakespeare.com Falstaff Award nomination for Best Supporting Performance, Male.

His first role in a major production was as an ensemble member and understudy of Mark in the national tour of Rent. Uranowitz made his Broadway debut in the 2011 jukebox musical Baby It's You!. He played the role of Stanley, the blind composer and son of Florence Greenberg as played by Beth Leavel. In their review of the musical, Variety noted that the "show is continually perked up by... ...Brandon Uranowitz (as a long-suffering press guy and Goldberg's blind son)."

In 2013, he was cast in Michael Kahn's Washington, D.C. production of Torch Song Trilogy. He starred as Arnold in the four-hour unabridged version of the play and was nominated for the Helen Hayes Award for Outstanding Lead Actor in a Resident Play.

During this time, Uranowitz has had minor appearances in the television series Law & Order: Criminal Intent, As the World Turns, and Inside Amy Schumer.

=== 2014–present: Breakthrough and acclaim ===
In 2014, he joined the original cast of the stage adaption of An American in Paris as composer Adam Hochberg. The show premiered in Paris at Théâtre du Châtelet in December 2014 and transferred to Broadway, opening in April 2015. He departed the show on August 7, 2016. The show was Uranowitz's breakthrough performance and netted him his first Tony Award nomination. He also portrayed Mrs. White in the 30th Anniversary one time tribute performance of the classic film Clue in December 2015.

Uranowitz joined the first revival of 1992 musical Falsettos, which opened on Broadway at the Walter Kerr Theatre on October 27, 2016, as a limited engagement. He portrayed Mendel, a psychiatrist, opposite Christian Borle as Marvin, Andrew Rannells as Whizzer, and Stephanie J. Block as Trina. For his performance, he received a 2017 Drama Desk Award nomination for Best Featured Actor in a Musical and a Tony Award nomination for Best Featured Actor in a Musical. His turn as Mendel in Falsettos received rave reviews. He was called "warmly funny and convincingly neurotic" as Mendel by The New York Times, "wholly endearing" by Entertainment Weekly, and The Hollywood Reporter said "Uranowitz is a worthy successor to the wonderful Chip Zien in the original production. He flirts with the stereotypical view of a Jewish therapist only marginally less messed-up than his patients, while also finding the truth in a compassionate man who has to convince himself of his right to be happy". Vulture said that Uranowitz offered "an unusually sexy Mendel".

Uranowitz appeared in the revue Prince of Broadway, which opened on Broadway in August 2017 and closed in October 2017. The revue featured the work of the director and producer Harold Prince. In 2018, he had a three episode arc on The Marvelous Mrs. Maisel as Buzz Goldberg, a Catskills activities director. Beginning in October 2018, he performed for four months in The Band's Visit on Broadway, replacing John Cariani. He subsequently played Larry in a limited run of Burn This on Broadway, opposite Adam Driver and Keri Russell. For his role, Uranowitz received nominations for the Drama Desk Award and Tony Award for Best Featured Actor in a Play.

In fall 2019, it was announced that he would star in a limited-run off-Broadway production of Stephen Sondheim's Assassins at the Classic Stage Company in spring 2020. The production was postponed to late 2021 due to the global pandemic. In 2020, he took part in the amfAR COVID-19 relief benefit The Great Work Begins, a live streamed event featuring scenes from Angels in America. He performed in the role of Louis Ironson. Uranowitz appeared in the 2021 Billy Crystal feature film Here Today. In 2022, he appeared in the Broadway run of the Tom Stoppard play Leopoldstadt, for which he won a Tony Award.

From January to February 2024, Uranowitz starred as Jon in Tick, Tick... Boom! at the Kennedy Center directed by Neil Patrick Harris. In November of that same year, he starred as Tateh in New York City Center's Encores! production of Ragtime opposite Joshua Henry, Caissie Levy and Colin Donnell, and the production transferred to Broadway the following year.

== Personal life ==
Uranowitz is gay. As of 2011, he is in a relationship with actor Zachary Prince. They met at the audition for Baby It's You! and Prince was subsequently cast as Uranowitz's understudy. Uranowitz and Prince have since married. [36]

== Acting credits ==
=== Theatre ===
==== Selected credits ====
Year(s)	Title	Role	Theatre	Director(s)	Ref.
1997	Ragtime	Little Boy (replacement)	Ford Centre for the Performing Arts	Frank Galati	
2009	Twelfth Night	Feste	Wild Project	Stephen Stout	
2009–2010	Rent	Mark Cohen (u/s)	U.S National Tour	Michael Greif	
2010	Broadway Bound	Eugene Jerome	Old Globe Theatre	Scott Schwartz	
2011	Baby, It's You!	Stanley Greenberg, Murray Schwartz, Johnny Cymbal, Kingsman	Broadhurst Theatre	Sheldon Epps	
2013	Torch Song Trilogy	Arnold	The Studio Theatre	Michael Kahn	
2014–2015	An American in Paris	Adam Hochberg	Théâtre du Châtelet	Christopher Wheeldon	
2015–2016	An American in Paris	Adam Hochberg	Palace Theatre	Christopher Wheeldon	
2016–2017	Falsettos	Dr. Mendel	Walter Kerr Theatre	James Lapine	
2017	Prince of Broadway	Various roles	Samuel J. Friedman Theatre	Harold Prince and Susan Stroman	
2017	Man of La Mancha	Sancho Panza / Cervantes' Manservant	Merkin Concert Hall	Jack Cummings III	
2018	Grand Hotel	Otto Kringelein	New York City Center	Joshua Rhodes	
2018	The Band's Visit	Itzik (replacement)	Ethel Barrymore Theatre	David Cromer	
2019	Burn This	Larry	Hudson Theatre	Michael Mayer	
2019	Road Show	Addison Mizner	New York City Center	Will Davis	
2021–2022	Assassins	Leon Czolgosz	Classic Stage Company	John Doyle	
2022	Assassins	Leon Czolgosz	Stephen Sondheim Theatre	John Doyle	
2022–2023	Leopoldstadt	Ludwig Jakobovicz, Nathan Fischbein	Longacre Theatre	Patrick Marber	
2024	Tick, Tick... Boom!	Jon	Kennedy Center	Neil Patrick Harris	
2024	Titanic	J. Bruce Ismay	New York City Center	Anne Kauffman	
2024	Ragtime	Tateh	New York City Center	Lear deBessonet	
2025	Becoming Eve	Jonah	New York Theatre Workshop	Tyne Rafaeli	
2025–2026	Ragtime	Tateh	Vivian Beaumont Theatre	Lear deBessonet	
2026–2027	Falsettos	Dr. Mendel	Carnegie Hall	Vadim Feichtner	
2027	Falsettos	Dr. Mendel	London Palladium	Vadim Feichtner	

==== Readings ====
Year	Title	Role	Theatre	Notes	Ref.
2015	Clue	Mrs. White	The Players	30th Anniversary tribute	

=== Film ===
Year	Title	Role	Ref.
2014	Stage Fright	Artie Getz	
2018	Goodbye, Brooklyn	Nicolas	
2019	The Kitchen	Shmuli Chudakoff	
2021	Here Today	Justin	

=== Television ===
Year	Title	Role	Notes	Ref.
2009	Law & Order: Criminal Intent	Dovid	Episode: "Rock Star"	
TBD	As the World Turns	Day Player	Uncredited	
2013	Inside Amy Schumer	Generations Instructor	Episode: "Real Sext"	
TBD	The Soul Man	U 5	Uncredited	
2017	Falsettos: Live from Lincoln Center	Mendel	Filmed stage production	
2017	Blue Bloods	Michael Goldman	Episode: "Pick Your Poison"	
2018	Dietland	Pablo	Episode: "F... This"	
2018–2022	The Marvelous Mrs. Maisel	Buzz Goldberg	4 episodes	
2019	Fosse/Verdon	Dustin Hoffman	Episode: "All I Care About Is Love"	

=== Cast recordings ===
- 2011: Baby It's You! (Original Cast Recording); featured on 2 tracks
- 2015: An American in Paris (Original Broadway Cast Recording); featured on 6 tracks
- 2016: Falsettos (2016 Broadway Cast Recording); featured on 14 tracks
- 2018: Prince of Broadway (Original Broadway Cast Recording); featured on 3 tracks
- 2022: Assassins (Studio Cast Recording); featured on 5 tracks
- 2022: The Violet Hour (The 2022 Off-Broadway Cast Recording); featured on 8 tracks
- 2026: Ragtime (2025 Broadway Cast Recording); featured on 6 tracks

== Awards and nominations ==
Year	Award	Category	Nominated Work	Result
2009	Falstaff Award	Best Supporting Performance, Male	Twelfth Night	Nominated
2014	Helen Hayes Award	Outstanding Lead Actor, Resident Play	Torch Song Trilogy	Nominated
2015	Tony Awards	Best Featured Actor in a Musical	An American in Paris	Nominated
2016	Grammy Awards	Best Musical Theater Album	An American in Paris	Nominated
2017	Drama Desk Awards	Outstanding Featured Actor in a Musical	Falsettos	Nominated
2017	Tony Awards	Best Featured Actor in a Musical	Falsettos	Nominated
2019	Drama Desk Awards	Outstanding Featured Actor in a Play	Burn This	Nominated
2019	Tony Awards	Best Featured Actor in a Play	Burn This	Nominated
2023	Drama Desk Awards	Outstanding Featured Performance in a Play	Leopoldstadt	Won
2023	Outer Critics Circle Awards	Outstanding Featured Performer in a Broadway Play	Leopoldstadt	Won
2023	Tony Awards	Best Featured Actor in a Play	Leopoldstadt	Won
2026	Drama League Awards	Distinguished Performance	Ragtime	Nominated
2026	Outer Critics Circle Awards	Outstanding Lead Performer in a Broadway Musical	Ragtime	Nominated
2026	Drama Desk Awards	Outstanding Lead Performance in a Musical	Ragtime	Nominated
2026	Tony Awards	Best Actor in a Musical	Ragtime	Nominated
2026	Dorian Award	Outstanding Lead Performance in a Broadway Musical	Ragtime	Nominated
