= An American in Paris (musical) =

2014 musical play

- 2015 Broadway poster
- Music: George Gershwin
- Lyrics: Ira Gershwin
- Book: Craig Lucas
- Basis: An American in Paris by Alan Jay Lerner; An American in Paris by George Gershwin
- Premiere: December 10, 2014: Théâtre du Châtelet, Paris
- Productions: 2014 Théâtre du Châtelet, Paris; 2015 Broadway; 2016 US tour 2017 West End
- Awards: Drama League Award for Distinguished Production of a Musical; Outer Critics Circle Award for Outstanding New Broadway Musical

An American in Paris is a musical play inspired by the 1951 film of the same name and adapted for the stage by Christopher Wheeldon. It first opened at the Théâtre du Châtelet in Paris in December 2014 and then at the Palace Theatre on Broadway in April 2015. Incorporating songs from George and Ira Gershwin, the book is by Craig Lucas. The musical won four Tony Awards.

The Broadway production closed in October 2016. A US national tour opened in the autumn of 2016 in Boston, Massachusetts, and a London West End production opened at the Dominion Theatre in March 2017. The Italian premiere took place in Genoa in Teatro Carlo Felice in October 2018.

== Plot ==
This synopsis reflects the American version of the musical play, which was revised after its premiere 2014 run in Paris.

Setting: Paris, 1945, at the end of the Second World War.

Act I

Adam Hochberg walks on stage and downs a cup of liquor. He sits at a piano and recounts the story of the day his friend, Jerry Mulligan, came to Paris. Just after the liberation of France, US Army Lieutenant Jerry Mulligan is struck by a mysterious girl after seeing her on the maze-like streets of Paris ("Concerto in F"). Ready to rebuild his life after the war, he deliberately misses his train home and decides to stay in Paris to nurture his passion for painting. He makes his way to a cafe/lodging house, where he meets Adam Hochberg, a fellow veteran and pianist, whose war injuries have left him with a permanent limp. Recognizing a kindred spirit, Adam helps Jerry find a place to live and helps him get started in Paris. Henri Baurel, the son of wealthy French industrialists, enters to rehearse the nightclub act he is putting together with Adam. Henri reveals his plans to run his family's American branch while becoming a nightclub star in secret, fearing his parents' disapproval of his dreams of being an entertainer. Both Henri and Jerry berate Adam for making his new song too dark when what Paris needs is light. Adam retorts that as artists, they have a duty to show the horrible things they've seen, and teases Henri about his fear of proposing to his girlfriend, whose name he will not tell Adam. The three bond in friendship as they imagine a brighter future ("I Got Rhythm").

Adam takes Jerry to the Paris ballet, where he is accompanying auditions, to sketch the dancers. Jerry bumps into headstrong American philanthropist, Milo Davenport, who, struck by his talent and good looks, invites him to a party to introduce him to gallery owners. Henri's mother, Madame Baurel, arrives with Ballet Director Maestro Z, and introduces Milo to him as a potential donor. Dancers arrive for the audition, and the audition has begun when to Jerry's shock, the mysterious girl arrives, apologizing for being late. She is told to leave, but Adam convinces her to dance in the back. As the audition continues, the girl dances beautifully, impressing the Ballet Director, Milo and both Jerry and Adam ("Second Prelude"). The girl introduces herself as Lise Dassin, and Maestro Z recognizes her as the daughter of the famed ballerina Arielle Dassin. In gratitude for his help, she gives Adam a flower and a kiss on the cheek before hurriedly leaving for her job. Milo, charmed by Lise and her mysterious demeanor, tells the maestro she will fund his season only if he commissions a piece just for Lise with a score written by Adam. She then takes it a step further, demanding it be designed by the 'noted painter' Jerry Mulligan. Helpless at her charismatic hands, the maestro agrees, except for allowing Jerry to design the ballet—he has his own stable of designers. Immediately infatuated with Lise, Adam sits down, thrilled with the prospect of writing a ballet that joins French and American culture.

Jerry interrupts Lise at her job at a perfume counter to tell her that she got the job. Lise is reserved, and but Jerry will not be dissuaded as he tries to get her to agree to meet with him at the Seine that evening, causing a ruckus in the store until he is thrown out ("I've Got Beginners' Luck"). Madame Baurel enters and congratulates Lise she is to be the prima ballerina of the Théâtre du Châtelet Ballet. It is revealed Lise lives with the Baurel family, which they have not disclosed to the Ballet in order to avoid charges of nepotism.

At the Baurel home, Henri attempts to write a letter proposing to his girlfriend, who is revealed to be Lise. Meanwhile, Lise sits down at a cafe and writes a letter to her mother; although presumed dead, she still hopes they are alive and writes a letter every day. She begs for advice: whether to marry Henri as expected, or try for true love ("The Man I Love"). Adam watches the scene from afar, falling deeper in love with Lise.

Jerry is sketching a bench at the banks of the Seine when Lise arrives for their meeting, telling him she cannot accept his friendship. He shows her an incomplete sketch of her he began after their first encounter on the street, and proposes she meet him every day so he can draw her until he gets it right. Offended, she refuses, but Jerry calms the atmosphere by saying Lise doesn't have to say anything if she doesn't want to. It becomes clear both are haunted by events during the War, and she solemnly agrees with him to put the war behind them. To lighten the mood, he declares her name too sorrowful and decides to call her Liza, telling her that in the hour they are together, they are just two crazy, happy fools down by the river ("Liza"). She agrees, only if he swears to never tell anyone. Overjoyed, he tries to kiss her, but she pushes him in the river. They both agree to meet the next day, same time, same place.

Henri is still attempting to draft his proposal letter, and his mother warns him if he doesn't do it soon, somebody else will. She implies his reluctance to propose is perhaps due to a romantic interest in men, which Henri denies, and warns him the family, vulnerable to accusations of collaboration with the Nazis, must be concerned with appearances. Lise enters with Mr. Baurel who says Henri has something to say to her. Dodging the subject, he asked her about her new position and tells her of him coming American tour. Lise tells him should he ever want a companion in America, she will accompany him gladly, and he takes this as an agreement to the proposal he has not yet made, mistaking her obvious glow of happiness for excitement about the ballet rather than for love of Jerry.

Back at the cafe, all three men rejoice over their love for Lise, eventually joining in a trio without realizing they are all singing about the same woman ("S'Wonderful"). Henri shows the other two his proposal letter, only to find he has Lise's notebook by mistake. He reads the letter to her mother about her doubts over doing what is expected of her, marrying Henri and following her heart. Stricken, he nonetheless finds a glimmer of hope in the letter. Adam offers to console him with a drink while Jerry heads over to Milo's party.

Jerry arrives at Milo's apartment to discover there was no party, and Milo has invited him on a date on false pretenses ("Shall We Dance?"). Initially annoyed, Jerry relents after Milo gives him constructive criticism on his art and takes him to meet various gallery representatives, and they begin a casual relationship.

Over the next week, Adam and Lise work on the new ballet, and struggle with the material. Milo continuously brings Jerry's designs in and they are routinely rejected. Milo and Jerry embark on a trek of the Parisian art world, exploding with new life and post-war energy as Milo falls in love with him. Jerry's designs are finally accepted, but the ballet continues to run into many problems, and Lise and Jerry find solace in their short daily meetings. Milo and Jerry go to a costume party, and Jerry is shocked to discover Lise there with Henri. Jerry realizes Lise is engaged to his friend and, in a fit of rage, he removes both his and Milo's masks, and with Lise watching, kisses her ("Second Rhapsody/Cuban Overture").

Act II

Adam is commissioned by the Baurels to play at one of their parties, not knowing his connection to Henri. Jerry is brought as Milo's plus one, and, in an attempt to cover up his secret nightclub act, Henri denies knowing them, arousing his parents' suspicions. After learning the party is a benefit for the ballet and dancers will be there, Jerry tries and fails to leave for the fear of confronting Lise. After seeing Lise is not among the dancers, he laughs in relief, causing a stir among the guests which eventually turns into a wild dance number ("Fidgety Feet"). After the performance, he discovers Lise is indeed there as a guest of honor. The Baurels, surprised to find both enjoy jazz, ask Milo for a recommendation for a nightclub, and when Milo asks Jerry, he recommends the nightclub where Henri and Adam are booked to perform. The Baurels announce Lise and Henri's engagement, crushing both Adam and Jerry, who lashes out at Milo and storms into the garden. Henri asks Milo to dance to comfort her, and they recognize each other as kindred spirits.

Lise follows him out into the garden. Jerry confronts her. Lise cannot lie and says she loves him, but cannot be with him because she is beholden to Henri for a reason she refuses to disclose. Jerry questions Henri's love for her and begs her to meet him again. Lise tells him she does not have the luxury of love and runs away because "life is not like your American movies." Jerry is left in despair. It is revealed Milo, Adam and Henri have been watching the altercation the whole time.

Back at their respective homes, they all act as if nothing has happened. In parallel conversations, Milo and Henri ask Jerry and Lise if they have anything to tell them. Dodging the question, they ask if they're worried of what the public thinks of them. They respond they don't care as long as they're in love ("Who Cares?/For You, For Me, For Evermore"). Henri pledges his love for Lise, but Jerry decides to be honest with Milo and break things off. Although she has fallen in love with him, she thanks him for being honest and they end their relationship amicably. Adam and Milo reflect on the love around them and wonder why there is no love for them ("But Not For Me").

In a nightclub in Montparnasse on one of their last shows, Adam and Henri get ready for a show. Adam begs Henri to let Lise stay in Paris and accuses him of being a coward both during the war and afterwards. Henri, furious, admits the truth: Lise is beholden to Henri because he and his family saved her life during the occupation. She was the daughter of the Baurel's Jewish butler, and she was entrusted to their care after her parents were arrested by the Nazis. Henri threw himself into the Resistance, all of them risking their lives for her, and have kept this secret due to the disruption this would cause their social status in the fragile post-war world. Adam asks if that means Lise has to throw away her life to pay Henri back when neither of them really love each other, and begs him to find the courage he had during the war and free Lise to make her own decisions. Before they can say more, they are called to places.

Jerry sees Lise at the nightclub and tells her that he and Milo are through and begs her to tell him what obligations she has to Henri, but Henri's act starts. Henri's act begins and he is stricken with nerves, but Adam encourages him to remember his dream, and he fantasizes of performing an elegant number in Radio City Music Hall ("Stairway to Paradise"). His act ends triumphantly. Unfortunately, Milo and his parents catch him, the nightclub being the one Jerry recommended (not knowing the recommendation was for the Baurels.) Mme Baurel berates him for shaming the family name, but Mr. Baurel is proud and in awe of his son's talent, and she capitulates. Lise, however, is angry at Jerry for accidentally exposing Henri and leaves. Jerry tries to run after her and accidentally knocks Adam to the ground. When he tries to help him up, Henri stops him, furious for disrupting his relationship with Lise. Jerry accuses him of being a coward. Henri punches him and tells him whatever he may think of him, Lise is what he has devoted his life to. To clear the air, Adam tells Jerry of Henri's involvement in the Resistance and Lise's past. Jerry understands, but is determined to keep fighting for love and tells Henri if he chooses duty over love, they are all doomed. Lise, who has overheard the confrontation, comes back in, telling Henri to take her home. Jerry pleads with her, but she departs, leaving him heartbroken. Adam has a flash of insight: if life is dark, then it is an artist's duty to celebrate and bring love back into life. He feverishly revises the score for the Ballet, turning it into a celebration of life.

On opening night at the Ballet, Jerry shifts around nervously outside Lise's dressing room, a scroll in his hand. Milo, seeing his indecision, offers to deliver it for him. Lise opens the scroll to find it is his drawing of her, finally complete. Milo advises her although Jerry was never serious about her, he did teach her one thing: money could not buy love, which is one of a kind. Lise thanks her, but confesses she knows the Ballet will fail; she is so upset that she does not feel any passion onstage. Milo advises her to think of someone who made her feel that passion as she dances. Lise clutches Jerry's drawing tight as places are called. The Ballet begins, and as it progresses, Lise imagines her partner has become Jerry, and they perform a magnificent pas de deux. The Ballet ends with Lise triumphant, having become a bona fide star ("An American in Paris").

After the curtain call, Jerry goes on to congratulate Lise and apologizes. Lise tells him not to, she couldn't have danced like that if she didn't love him. Milo asks Henri if he feels alright. He admits he cannot tell if his love for Lise is out of duty or passion and asks to take a drive with Lise. Milo approves, and advises him to call her the next day. Lise asks for one moment and approaches Adam. She gives Adam a rose out of her bouquet, a gesture usually done by an etoile to her pas de deux partner, and kisses him good bye. He takes her aside and warns she is making a mistake by doing her duty. Love is a one time thing and she should follow her heart. She leaves, and Audience members go up to congratulate Adam. He has been praised in every review. It is then he realizes his love for Lise isn't for her, but for the light she brings into the world. He rejoices he got the chance to capture her in music and vows to do good in the world. The three men vow to always remember Lise and thank her for how she has changed their lives ("They Can't Take That Away From Me").

Jerry sits alone by the Seine. Lise appears. She has decided to follow her heart. They dance together and walk off into the Paris night ("Epilogue").

== Cast ==
Character	Paris	Broadway	US tour	West End	Australia
Character	2014	2015	2016	2017	2022
Jerry Mulligan	Robbie Fairchild	Robbie Fairchild	Garen Scribner	Robbie Fairchild	Robbie Fairchild
Lise Dassin	Leanne Cope	Leanne Cope	Sara Esty	Leanne Cope	Leanne Cope
Milo Davenport	Jill Paice	Jill Paice	Emily Ferranti	Zoe Rainey	Ashleigh Rubenach
Adam Hochberg	Brandon Uranowitz	Brandon Uranowitz	Etai Benson	David Seadon-Young	Jonathan Hickey
Henri Baurel	Max von Essen	Max von Essen	Nick Spangler	Haydn Oakley	Sam Ward
Madame Baurel	Veanne Cox	Veanne Cox	Gayton Scott	Jane Asher	Anne Wood

== Productions ==
Production	Venue/Location	Opening	Closing
Paris	Théâtre du Châtelet	December 10, 2014	January 4, 2015
Broadway	Palace Theatre	April 12, 2015	October 9, 2016
US Tour (2016–18)	Various	October 14, 2016	July 1, 2018
West End	Dominion Theatre	March 21, 2017	January 6, 2018
Australia	Various	January 8, 2022	July 24, 2022
US Tour (2022)	Various	January 28, 2022	May 21, 2022

=== Paris ===
An American in Paris opened at Théâtre du Châtelet in Paris, France, on December 10, 2014 for a limited run through January 4, 2015.

=== Broadway ===
The musical opened on Broadway at the Palace Theatre on April 12, 2015, following an engagement at the Théâtre du Châtelet in Paris. Christopher Wheeldon directs and choreographs, with the cast led by Robert Fairchild, Leanne Cope, Veanne Cox, Jill Paice, Brandon Uranowitz and Max von Essen.

The creative team consisted of Bob Crowley (sets and costumes) and Natasha Katz (lighting) as well as Jon Weston (sound) and 59 Productions (projections). The musical score was adapted, arranged and supervised by Rob Fisher, orchestrations were by Christopher Austin, dance arrangements by Sam Davis, musical supervision by Todd Ellison and musical direction by Brad Haak. Of the musical numbers in the film, the show retains "I Got Rhythm", "'S Wonderful", "Stairway to Paradise", and the orchestral pieces Concerto in F and An American in Paris, with other numbers drawn from the George Gershwin's works.

The production closed October 9, 2016 after 623 performances and 29 preview performances.

=== US tour (2016–18) ===
The US national tour opened in Boston, Massachusetts in October 2016, starring Garen Scribner and Sara Esty. The run ended on July 1, 2018.

=== West End ===
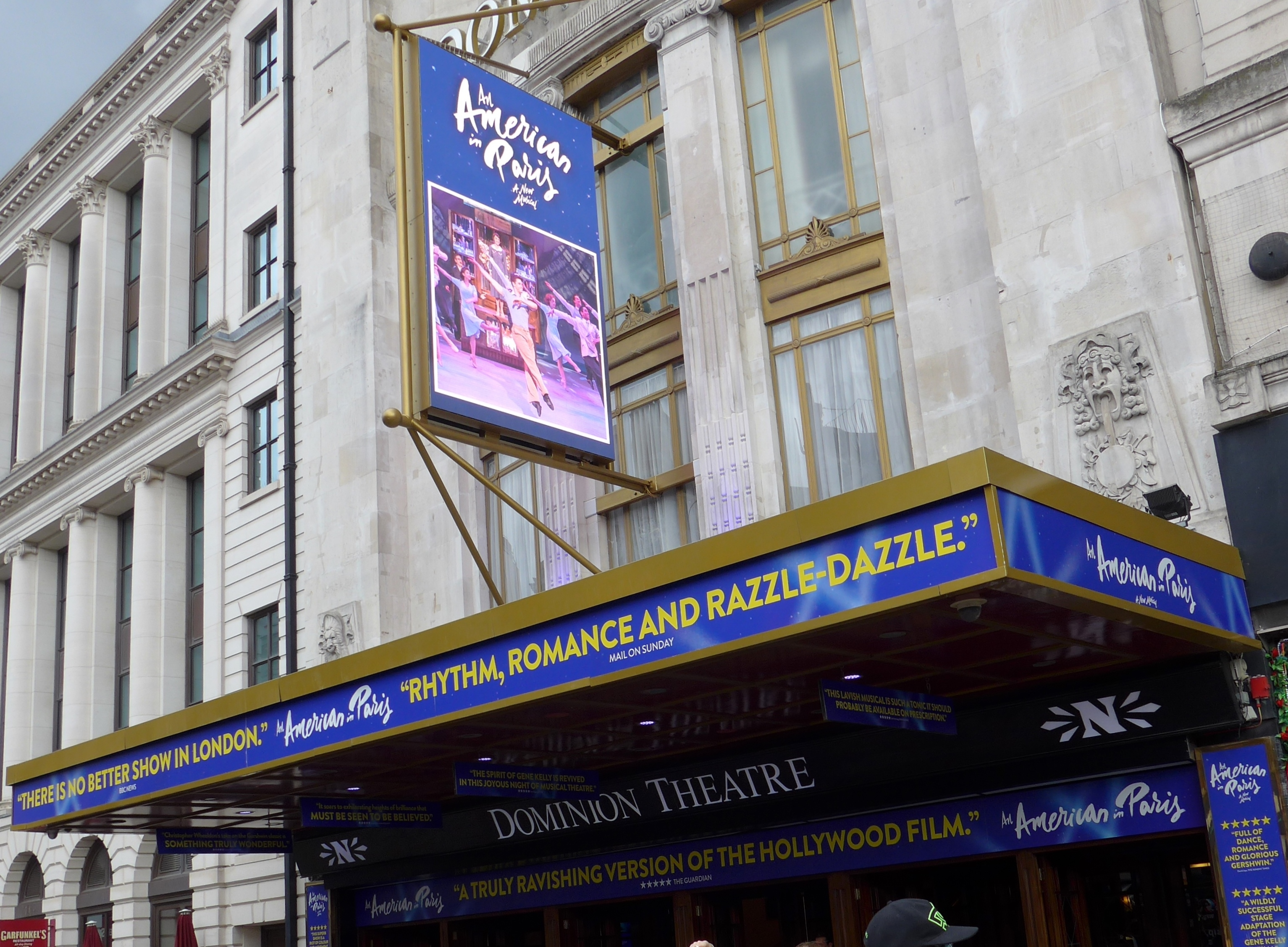
An American in Paris on new double-sided LED screen of the Dominion Theatre

The musical made its UK premiere in London's West End on March 21, 2017, following previews from March 4, at the Dominion Theatre with Robert Fairchild and Leanne Cope reprising their roles as Jerry and Lise. After three months, Ashley Day took over the lead role of Jerry from Fairchild. The production ran until January 6, 2018. The production also aired on PBS' Great Performances.

=== 2018 West End recording ===
Trafalgar Releasing announced a new film version of the stage production set for release in 2018. The West End production was filmed with a live audience in May 2017 and live-streamed across cinemas. The film is available for viewing on BroadwayHD.

=== Australia ===
An American In Paris had its Australian premiere at the Lyric Theatre, Brisbane, where it played from 8 January - 30 January 2022.

Broadway and West End leads Robbie Fairchild and Leanne Cope reprised their roles as GI Jerry Mulligan and Lise Dassin in Australia, with Cameron Holmes and Dimity Azoury from The Australian Ballet, to alternate in the lead roles.

It subsequently toured to The Arts Centre, Melbourne from 18 March - 23 April 2022, Theatre Royal, Sydney from 29 April - 2 July 2022.

The tour continued without Fairchild and Cope at the Crown Theatre, Perth from 9 July - 24 July 2022. The tour was scheduled to conclude in Adelaide, but the stop was postponed due to the COVID-19 pandemic.

=== US tour (2022) ===
Following its COVID-19 pandemic closing in 2020, the second US national tour opened at the Palace Theater (Waterbury, CT) on January 28, 2022 starring Branson Bice and Camila Rodrigues. The tour will travel to over 20 cities in the continental United States before closing in May 2022.

== Musical numbers ==
From the Broadway production. Source: Internet Broadway Database

Act I

- Concerto in F – Company
- "I Got Rhythm" – Henri, Adam, Jerry, Company
- Second Prelude – Lise, Female Ensemble
- "I've Got Beginner's Luck" – Jerry
- "The Man I Love" – Lise
- "Liza" – Jerry
- "'S Wonderful" – Adam, Henri, Jerry, Company
- "Shall We Dance?" – Milo
- Second Rhapsody/Cuban Overture – Company

Act II

- Entr'acte – Orchestra
- "Fidgety Feet" – Jerry, Company
- "Who Cares?" – Milo, Adam, Henri
- "For You, for Me, for Evermore" – Lise, Henri, Jerry, Milo
- "But Not for Me" – Adam, Milo
- "I'll Build a Stairway to Paradise" – Henri, Adam, Company
- An American in Paris – Company
- "They Can't Take That Away from Me" – Adam, Jerry, Henri
- "Epilogue" – Orchestra

== Awards and nominations ==
An American in Paris won four Tony Awards, three Outer Critics Circle Awards, a Drama League Award, two Theatre World Awards, four Drama Desk Awards, three Fred and Adele Astaire Awards, and an Actors Equity Association "ACCA" Award.

=== Original Broadway production ===
Year	Award Ceremony	Category	Nominee	Result
2015	Drama Desk Awards	Outstanding Musical		Nominated
2015	Drama Desk Awards	Outstanding Actor in a Musical	Robert Fairchild	Won
2015	Drama Desk Awards	Outstanding Actress in a Musical	Leanne Cope	Nominated
2015	Drama Desk Awards	Outstanding Featured Actor in a Musical	Max von Essen	Nominated
2015	Drama Desk Awards	Outstanding Book of a Musical	Craig Lucas	Nominated
2015	Drama Desk Awards	Outstanding Director of a Musical	Christopher Wheeldon	Nominated
2015	Drama Desk Awards	Outstanding Choreography	Christopher Wheeldon	Won
2015	Drama Desk Awards	Outstanding Costume Design	Bob Crowley	Nominated
2015	Drama Desk Awards	Outstanding Orchestrations	Christopher Austin	Won
2015	Drama Desk Awards	Outstanding Projection Design	59 Productions	Nominated
2015	Drama Desk Awards	Outstanding Set Design	Bob Crowley	Won
2015	Drama Desk Awards	Outstanding Sound Design in a Musical	Jon Weston	Nominated
2015	Drama League Awards	Outstanding Production of a Musical		Won
2015	Drama League Awards	Distinguished Performance	Leanne Cope	Nominated
2015	Drama League Awards	Distinguished Performance	Robert Fairchild	Nominated
2015	Outer Critics Circle Awards	Outstanding New Broadway Musical		Won
2015	Outer Critics Circle Awards	Outstanding Actor in a Musical	Robert Fairchild	Won
2015	Outer Critics Circle Awards	Outstanding Actress in a Musical	Leanne Cope	Nominated
2015	Outer Critics Circle Awards	Outstanding Featured Actor in a Musical	Max von Essen	Nominated
2015	Outer Critics Circle Awards	Outstanding Choreography	Christopher Wheeldon	Won
2015	Outer Critics Circle Awards	Outstanding Director of a Musical	Christopher Wheeldon	Won
2015	Outer Critics Circle Awards	Outstanding Lighting Design	Natasha Katz	Nominated
2015	Outer Critics Circle Awards	Outstanding Set Design	Bob Crowley	Nominated
2015	Fred and Adele Astaire Awards	Best Female Dancer	Leanne Cope	Won
2015	Fred and Adele Astaire Awards	Best Female Dancer	Jill Paice	Nominated
2015	Fred and Adele Astaire Awards	Best Male Dancer	Robert Fairchild	Won
2015	Fred and Adele Astaire Awards	Best Choreographer	Christopher Wheeldon	Won
2015	Tony Awards	Best Musical		Nominated
2015	Tony Awards	Best Actor in a Musical	Robert Fairchild	Nominated
2015	Tony Awards	Best Actress in a Musical	Leanne Cope	Nominated
2015	Tony Awards	Best Featured Actor in a Musical	Brandon Uranowitz	Nominated
2015	Tony Awards	Best Featured Actor in a Musical	Max von Essen	Nominated
2015	Tony Awards	Best Book of a Musical	Craig Lucas	Nominated
2015	Tony Awards	Best Choreography	Christopher Wheeldon	Won
2015	Tony Awards	Best Direction of a Musical	Christopher Wheeldon	Nominated
2015	Tony Awards	Best Costume Design of a Musical	Bob Crowley	Nominated
2015	Tony Awards	Best Lighting Design of a Musical	Natasha Katz	Won
2015	Tony Awards	Best Orchestrations	Christopher Austin, Don Sebesky, and Bill Elliott	Won
2015	Tony Awards	Best Scenic Design of a Musical	Bob Crowley and 59 Productions	Won
2016	Grammy Awards	Best Musical Theater Album	Leanne Cope, Max Von Essen, Robert Fairchild, Jill Paice, Brandon Uranowitz, Rob Fisher & Scott Lehrer	Nominated

=== Original West End production ===
Year	Award Ceremony	Category	Nominee	Result
2017	Evening Standard Theatre Awards	Best Musical		Nominated
2017	Evening Standard Theatre Awards	Best Musical Performance	Robert Fairchild	Nominated
2018	Laurence Olivier Awards	Best New Musical		Nominated
2018	Laurence Olivier Awards	Best Theatre Choreographer	Christopher Wheeldon	Nominated
2018	Laurence Olivier Awards	Best Set Design	Bob Crowley and 59 Productions	Won

== See also ==
- An American in Paris
- An American in Paris (film)
- An American in Paris (ballet)
