= Dog Day Afternoon (play) =

Play by Stephen Adly Guirgis

- Broadway production playbill cover
- Original language: English
- Written by: Stephen Adly Guirgis
- Based on: Dog Day Afternoon by Sidney Lumet
- Characters: Sonny Amato; Sal DeSilva
- Setting: Brooklyn, 1972

Premiere
- Date: March 30, 2026
- Place: August Wilson Theatre
- Directed by: Rupert Goold
- Official website

Dog Day Afternoon is a play by American playwright Stephen Adly Guirgis, based on the 1975 film of the same name directed by Sidney Lumet.

== Background ==
The film itself is based on the Life magazine article "The Boys in the Bank" by P. F. Kluge and Thomas Moore, which is about the real-life 1972 Brooklyn bank robbery by John Wojtowicz and Salvatore Naturile.

Dog Day Afternoon premiered on March 30, 2026, at the August Wilson Theatre on Broadway, with Rupert Goold as director and starring Jon Bernthal with Ebon Moss-Bachrach.

A stage adaptation of the film by Guirgis was originally announced in 2016, with production by Warner Bros. Theatre Ventures. At the time, no date had been set for the production. In June 2025, it was announced the play would premiere in early 2026, with Bernthal and Moss-Bachrach as cast members, both making their Broadway debuts. The opening date was later announced as March 30, with previews beginning on March 10, 2026. The production was nominated for a Drama League Award for Outstanding Production of a Play, along with nominations for three Tony Awards. The run ended on July 12, 2026.

== Roles and cast ==
Character	Broadway
Character	2026
Sonny Amato	Jon Bernthal
Sal DeSilva	Ebon Moss-Bachrach
Colleen	Jessica Hecht
Detective Fucco	John Ortiz
Sheldon	Spencer Garrett
Leon	Esteban Andres Cruz
Roxxanna / Sonny's Mom / Gloria	Elizabeth Canavan
Butterman	Michael Kostroff
Guadalupe	Paola Lázaro
Mr. Eddy	Danny Johnson
Lorna	Wilemina Olivia-Garcia
Ray Ray	Christopher Sears
Alison	Andrea Syglowski
Young Nesbit	Michael Shayan
Widower Dave	Jeff Still
Sergeant Brown	Michael Puzzo

== Awards and nominations ==
Year	Award	Category	Work	Result	Ref.
2026	Drama League Awards	Outstanding Production of a Play		Nominated	
2026	Drama League Awards	Distinguished Performance	Jon Bernthal	Nominated	
2026	Outer Critics Circle Award	Outstanding Featured Performer in a Broadway Play	Jessica Hecht	Nominated	
2026	Tony Awards	Best Costume Design of a Play	Brenda Abbandandolo	Nominated	
2026	Tony Awards	Best Lighting Design of a Play	Isabella Byrd	Nominated	
2026	Tony Awards	Best Scenic Design of a Play	David Korins	Nominated	
2026	Broadway.com Audience Choice Awards	Favorite New Play		Won	
