= Ziegfeld Follies of 1936 =

- 1936 Broadway Playbill
- Music: Vernon Duke
- Lyrics: Ira Gershwin
- Book: Ira Gershwin and David Freedman
- Productions: 1936 Broadway; 1999 New York concert

The Ziegfeld Follies of 1936 is a musical revue with lyrics by Ira Gershwin, music by Vernon Duke and sketches by Gershwin and David Freedman. The Ziegfeld Follies were a series of revues presented from 1907 through 1931, 1934, 1936, 1943, and 1957.

== Productions and background ==
=== Original 1936 ===
The musical premiered on Broadway at the Winter Garden Theatre on January 30, 1936 and closed on May 9, 1936 after 115 performances. Produced by Billie Burke Ziegfeld and Lee Shubert and J. J. Shubert, it was directed by John Murray Anderson and Edward Clarke Lilley, choreographed by Robert Alton, sketches directed by Edward D. Dowling, and ballets directed by George Balanchine. Scenic design and costumes were by Vincente Minnelli, with additional costumes by Raoul Pène Du Bois, and original orchestrations were by Robert Russell Bennett, Conrad Salinger, Hans Spialek and Don Walker. The cast starred Fanny Brice, Bob Hope, Eve Arden, Josephine Baker, Judy Canova, Gertrude Niesen, June Preisser, and the Nicholas Brothers.

The musical had a return engagement on Broadway at the Winter Garden Theatre on September 14, 1936, and closed on December 19, 1936 after 112 performances. Brice reprised her role, with the additional cast of Bobby Clark, Gypsy Rose Lee, Cass Daley, and Jane Pickens.

Fanny Brice was the star of the Follies and dominated the show, so much so that when she became ill in May 1936, the production closed.

=== 1999 Encores! ===
The Follies were presented as a staged concert in 1999 as part of City Center's Encores! Great American Musicals in Concert with musical director Rob Fisher and the Coffee Club Orchestra. The revival was directed by Mark Waldrop who also adapted the book, choreographed by Thommie Walsh, the ballet sequence choreographed by Christopher Wheeldon. The scenic consultant was John Lee Beatty; costume coordinator, Gregg Barnes; lighting by Peter Kaczorowski, sound by Scott Lehrer and projections by Eyewash, Inc.

It starred: Christine Ebersole, Ruthie Henshall, Peter Scolari, Howard McGillin, Stephanie Pope, Mary Testa, Karen Ziemba, Bob Walton, Jim Walton, Stanley Bojarski Kevin Chamberlin, Jock Soto, Jenifer Ringer, and Jonathan Sharp.

Decca Broadway released a CD of this production in 2001, including a 34-page booklet with photos of the 1936 cast, lyrics, and a description of the process in reconstructing the original score.

== Sketches ==
In the opening number Brice mocks her famous song ("My Man") in "He Hasn't a Thing Except Me", standing against a lamp-post. In "The Sweepstakes Taker" Brice portrays a Jewish Bronx housewife who wins the Irish sweepstakes. In "Fancy Free' she becomes the affected and bored British "Zuleika" as she exchanges witty remarks with her husband Sir Robert, and, leaving behind elegance, burps in his face and utters a trade-mark "Denk you." As Baby Snooks, Brice stars with popular stars of the day (such as Clark Gable).

== Songs ==
Gershwin and Duke wrote 28 songs and special material, but almost half were cut. The only song to become popular was "I Can't Get Started (With You)", helped by an early recording by Bunny Berigan. The song was sung by Bob Hope to Eve Arden. The Berigan recording was inducted into the Grammy Hall of Fame.

Act 1

- Time Marches On
- He Hasn't a Thing Except Me
- (My) Red Letter Day
- (Island in the) West Indies
- Words Without Music (Staged by George Balanchine)
- The Economic Situation (Aren't You Wonderful)
- Fancy! Fancy!
- Night Flight (Staged by George Balanchine)
- Maharanee (At the Night Races in Paris)
- The Gazooka

Act 2

- (That) Moment of Moments
- Sentimental Weather
- 5 A.M. (Staged by George Balanchine)
- I Can't Get Started (with You)
- Modernistic Moe
- Dancing to Our Score
