= Rob Howell =

British costume and set designer

Robert Stuart Howell is a British costume and set designer. He is primarily known for his work on the London stage. Howell won the Olivier Award for his set design for the musical Matilda the Musical in 2012. He has also designed both scenery and costumes for several Broadway shows, and won the Drama Desk Award for Outstanding Set Design for Ghost the Musical in 2012.

== Career ==
After leaving college, Howell worked for two and a half years with the Royal Shakespeare Company as a resident design assistant. He met Matthew Warchus there, who years later asked him whether he would be interested in working on Matilda the Musical.

Howell has designed sets and costumes for numerous plays and musicals in the UK, in London and for Broadway over a 20-year period (based on a 2012 interview). In London, he has designed for Royal National Theatre productions including Buried Child, Chips with Everything, Troilus and Cressida, Battle Royal, and Howard Katz. He has also designed for productions at the Royal Court Theatre, the Donmar Warehouse, the Almeida Theatre, and the Royal Shakespeare Company as well as for regional UK theatres. He was the set and costume designer for the stage musical Lord of the Rings (West End, 2007).

Howell has won fifteen Olivier Awards for Best Set Design. The most recent of these was for his work on the West End production of Matilda the Musical. He has received 2013 Tony Award nominations for his work on the Broadway production of Matilda the Musical, for both Best Scenic Design of a Musical and Best Costume Design of a Musical. His set design for Matilda the Musical was described:

Howell's unique design for Matilda the Musical saw the entire Cambridge theatre, from foyer to stage, transformed into Roald Dahl's imaginative world. The cast climb on giant alphabet soup letters, perform in health and safety defying scenes on wooden spoons and clamber over the imposing thighs of Miss Trunchbull, in her fearsome school... [the] eye-catching and uniquely eccentric design provides a fittingly colourful and exuberant setting.

Howell designed set and costumes for Richard Eyre's 2014 production of Mozart's opera Le nozze di Figaro at the Metropolitan Opera in New York City.

In 2015, it was announced he had teamed up with the creative team from Matilda to design Groundhog Day.

== Broadway ==
Source: Internet Broadway Database

- Matilda the Musical – 2013
- Ghostie The Musical – 2012
- Private Lives – 2011
- The Norman Conquests: Living Together – 2009
- The Norman Conquests: Table Manners – 2009
- The Norman Conquests: Round and Round the Garden – 2009
- Boeing-Boeing – 2008
- The Graduate – 2002
- Betrayal – 2000
- True West – 2000

== Awards and nominations ==
Year	Award	Category	Work	Result
2008	Tony Award	Best Costume Design of a Play	Boeing-Boeing	Nominated
2009	Tony Award	Best Scenic Design of Play	The Norman Conquests	Nominated
2009	Drama Desk Award	Outstanding Set Design of a Play	The Norman Conquests	Nominated
2009	Drama Desk Award	Outstanding Costume Design	The Norman Conquests	Nominated
2012	Tony Award	Best Scenic Design of a Musical	Ghost the Musical	Nominated
2012	Drama Desk Award	Outstanding Set Design	Ghost the Musical	Won
2013	Tony Award	Best Scenic Design of a Musical	Matilda the Musical	Won
2013	Tony Award	Best Costume Design of a Musical	Matilda the Musical	Nominated
2013	Drama Desk Award	Outstanding Set Design	Matilda the Musical	Won
2013	Outer Critics Circle Award	Outstanding Set Design	Matilda the Musical	Won
2017	Tony Award	Best Scenic Design of a Musical	Groundhog Day	Nominated
2019	Tony Award	Best Scenic Design of a Play	The Ferryman	Won
2019	Tony Award	Best Costume Design of a Play	The Ferryman	Won
2019	Outer Critics Circle Award	Outstanding Scenic Design	The Ferryman	Nominated
2019	Outer Critics Circle Award	Outstanding Costume Design	The Ferryman	Nominated
2020	Tony Award	Best Scenic Design of a Play	A Christmas Carol	Won
2020	Tony Award	Best Costume Design of a Play	A Christmas Carol	Won
