= Brigitte Reiffenstuel =

German costume designer

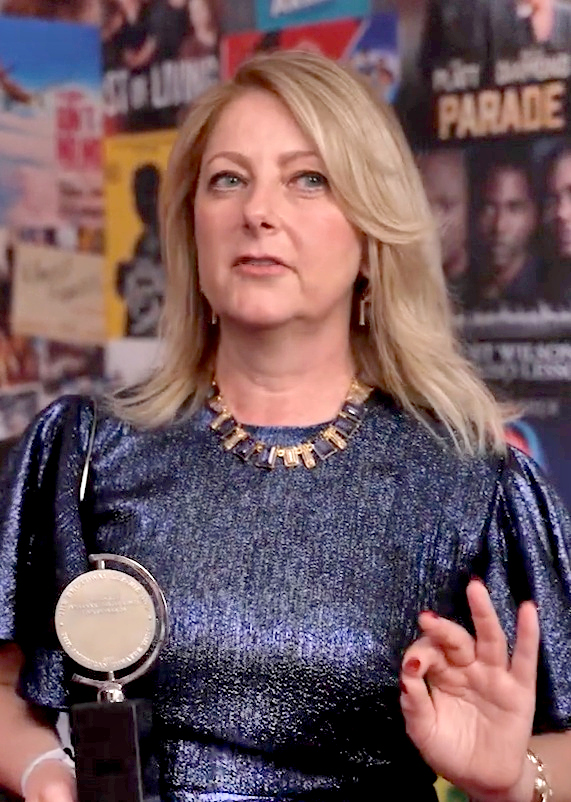
- Reiffenstuel - Tony Awards 2023
- Born: 1965 (age 60–61); Munich, Germany
- Website: https://brigittereiffenstuel.com

Brigitte Reiffenstuel is a German costume designer working primarily in opera and theatre.

== Early life and education ==
Reiffenstuel was born in Munich, Germany. She attended London College of Fashion and St. Martin's School of Art.

== Career ==
In 2012, Reiffenstuel designed costumes for Falstaff; a co-production of the Metropolitan Opera, the Royal Opera House, Teatro alla Scala, the Canadian Opera Company, and the Dutch National Opera. For her work, Reiffenstuel was nominated for Designer of the Year at the 2014 International Opera Awards and won a Dora Mavor Moore Award for Outstanding Costume Design.

In 2014, Reiffenstuel designed costumes for Kate Bush's Before the Dawn concert residency.

In 2020, Reiffenstuel designed costumes for Tom Stoppard's Leopoldstadt on the West End. In 2022, the production transferred to Broadway's Longacre Theatre. In 2023, Reiffenstuel was nominated for the Outer Critics Circle Award for Outstanding Costume Design and won the Tony Award for Best Costume Design of a Play.

In 2023, Reiffenstuel designed costumes for Stranger Things: The First Shadow on the West End. The show transferred to Broadway in 2025. For her work on The First Shadow, Reiffenstuel received her second Tony nomination for Best Costume Design in a Play.
