= Hand to God (play) =

2011 theatrical production by Robert Askins

- Written by: Robert Askins
- Characters: Jason; Tyrone; Pastor Greg; Margery; Jessica; Timmy
- Original language: English
- Genre: Comedy
- Setting: Cypress, Texas

Premiere
- Date premiered: October 2011 (14 years ago)
- Place premiered: Ensemble Studio Theatre; New York City
- Official website

Hand to God is a play written by Robert Askins. The play was produced Off-Broadway in 2011 and 2014 and on Broadway in 2015. The Broadway production received five Tony Award nominations, including for Best New Play.

== Productions ==
Hand to God premiered Off-Broadway at the Ensemble Studio Theatre in October 2011, and returned in February 2012.

Hand to God opened Off-Broadway at the Lucille Lortel Theatre on March 10, 2014, directed by Moritz von Stuelpnagel in an MCC Theater production.

Hand to God opened on Broadway at the Booth Theatre on April 7, 2015. The cast features Steven Boyer as Jason/Tyrone, Geneva Carr as Margery, Michael Oberholtzer as Timothy, Sarah Stiles as Jessica, and Marc Kudisch as Pastor Greg (a role later played by Bob Saget), with direction by Moritz von Stuelpnagel, sets by Beowulf Boritt, costumes by Sydney Maresca, and lighting by Jason Lyons. The original puppets were designed and built by Marte Johanne Ekhougen. It closed in the United States on January 3, 2016.

Hand to God opened in London at the Vaudeville Theatre on February 5, 2016, set to run through June 11, 2016. The cast featured Neil Pearson as Pastor Greg, Harry Melling as Jason/Tyrone, Janie Dee as Margery, Jemima Rooper as Jessica and Kevin Mains as Timmy. The show shortened its limited run; first to June 4, 2016 and then to April 30, 2016.

== Concept ==
Hand to God is an "irreverent puppet comedy ...about a possessed Christian-ministry puppet." Author Robert Askins said that "Hand to God is an expression about honesty. It’s a southern regionalism that’s fairly unknown in the North."

== Synopsis ==
In the devoutly religious, relatively quiet small town of Cypress, Texas, Margery is a widow whose husband has recently died. To keep her occupied, her minister, Pastor Greg, has asked her to run the puppet club. Fundamentalist Christian congregations often use puppets to teach children how to follow the Bible and avoid Satan. The teenage members of the club are her son Jason; Jessica, the girl next door that Jason has a crush on; and Timmy, the neighborhood troublemaker whose mother is attending Alcoholics Anonymous meetings at the church. Pastor Greg wants the puppet club to put on a performance at the church next Sunday. The characters become sexually attracted to each other. Jason's hand puppet, Tyrone, takes on a life of his own, announces that he is Satan, leads them into sin, and expresses secrets that the characters would rather have left unacknowledged.

== Plot ==
=== Prologue ===
In the empty basement of a church "Somewhere in Texas where the country meets the city", a sock puppet emerges from an empty puppet stage and proceeds to tell the story of mankind and the origins of the devil. The puppet describes the devil as a creation made up by someone as a way to explain away all of the bad things people do. It leaves with a remark that all it takes for a person who has committed bad to be accepted by others is the excuse: "the devil made me do it."

=== Act 1 ===
The same church basement is the setting of a puppet class, taught by the recently widowed Margery and attended by three disinterested teenagers: the nerdy and deadbeat Jessica, the hormonal and expletive-spouting Timothy, and Margery's introverted son Jason. Of the three, only Jason and Jessica have brought their puppets, and Jason is the only one who has finished his––a sock puppet named Tyrone, the same one from the opening monologue. Despite his repeated rude interruptions of the class, Timothy is romantically infatuated with Margery, which she gently tries to reject. The church's leader Pastor Greg ropes Margery into directing a performance of the puppet class in front of the congregation. While hanging out after class, Jason impresses Jessica by performing an excerpt from "Who's on First?" with Tyrone. When Jason tries to lie he came up with the skit, Tyrone interrupts to call him out and crassly tells Jessica about Jason's crush on her. Although Jessica at first appears to reciprocate, they are interrupted by Tyrone further claiming that Jason "touches himself" thinking about her, scaring her off. In the car on the way home, Jason tells his mother he no longer wants to do the puppet class as he is scared of Tyrone, but Margery refuses to listen, insisting that she needs the performance to go well as they need a win since the death of Jason's father early in the year from a heart attack. Jason tries to get her attention by ripping his puppet's head in half, prompting Margery to hysterically kick him out of the car.

When none of the students show up for puppet class the next day, Pastor Greg tries to comfort Margery and reveals his feelings for her. Margery gently turns him down, claiming it is too soon since her husband's death. As the rejected Pastor Greg leaves, he insists that they perform in front of the next Sunday's service. Frustrated, Margery starts destroying parts of the classroom just as Timothy enters with his puppet. Seeing her rampage, he joins in on her command, their actions becoming increasingly sexual before they give in to their urges and engage in violent intercourse. At home, Jason is woken up in the morning by Tyrone, who has been sewn back together and had teeth added to his mouth. Tyrone, angered by Jason tearing him in half, harasses Jason for his naïveté, claiming his father was miserable and ate himself to death because he resented his child. He convinces Jason to return to the church and tell everyone exactly what he thinks of them, and to act rude to Jessica so she will like him.

The next day, Pastor Greg finds the classroom in shambles. As Margery and the students enter, she denies any knowledge, though Timothy is insistent on reminding Margery of their dalliance. While waiting for Margery to find her scripts, Tyrone starts harassing Timothy and bluntly flirts with Jessica when she arrives. When Timothy starts bullying Jessica again, Tyrone comes to her defense and calls out Timothy for his behavior, accusing him of being pathetic. Timothy retorts by revealing he had sex with Margery, to Jason and Jessica's disbelief. An enraged Tyrone attacks Timothy, biting off his ear seemingly against Jason's will. Margery and Pastor Greg run in to see the commotion: when Tyrone calls out Margery with what he knows, Margery insists “the devil’s got him.” Tyrone responds by causing an overhead lamp to abruptly burn out, and the congregation flees from the classroom, leaving Jason alone with Tyrone.

=== Act 2 ===
The rest of the group gathers in Pastor Greg's office, trying to figure out their next move. After sewing Timothy's ear back on, Margery insists they perform an exorcism, but Jessica and Pastor Greg question whether Jason is actually possessed, suggesting they instead call the police. Margery rejects this course of action, worried that they will take Jason away from her, so Pastor Greg agrees to confront Jason and Tyrone. Back in the basement, Tyrone, apparently with Jason's help, has turned the room into his own personal hell, with graffiti, torn up posters, mutilated stuffed animals, and crucified dolls. Tyrone brushes off Jason's questions if he his actually the devil, claiming that every action one could easily pin on the devil was really done by Jason, even the lightbulb turning off by itself. Pastor Greg arrives and at first seems to get through to Jason. However, Tyrone figures out the pastor's feelings for Margery and snidely reveals that Margery and Timothy had sex, which Jason reluctantly confirms, prompting Pastor Greg to run out of the classroom. Back in the office, Timothy convinces Margery to sleep with him one more time, but their tryst is interrupted: first by Jessica, who is looking for the keys to Margery's car to get the rest of the puppets; second by Pastor Greg. Upon seeing this, Margery rejects Timothy once and for all. Angered, he leaves, insisting he will tell everyone about her.

A disgusted Pastor Greg starts to call the police on Margery, claiming he can no longer keep her around. Margery finally snaps and calls out Pastor Greg for using his role as the church leader to try to seduce her, and bemoans her deteriorating relationship with her son since her husband's death and the church's failure to help her, while tearing pages out of Pastor Greg's bible. After letting out all her anger, she admits defeat and suggests they call the police after all, but Pastor Greg decides against it. Back in the basement, Jessica sneaks in through a window with her own puppet, a buxom character complete with button breasts named Jolene, who seduces Tyrone. As the two puppets engage in wild sex, Jessica uses the distraction to get through to Jason, insisting that she likes him and not the rude Tyrone, and asks him out to homecoming before Pastor Greg and Margery enter. Pastor Greg has Margery talk to Jason directly as she tries to apologize for her actions over Tyrone's name-calling. Eventually, Tyrone grows so angry that he accuses Margery of killing “my father,” which causes Jason to go silent before he, as himself, angrily blames Margery for his father's death and tells her to leave, which she does reluctantly. Pastor Greg warns Jason that he needs to choose whether he or Tyrone gets out of the room.

Jason finally has enough of Tyrone's influence and tries to remove the puppet from his hand, only for Tyrone to respond violently by attacking his puppeteer. After a lengthy struggle, Jason finally removes the puppet from his hand. When he attempts to use a towel to treat a finger that Tyrone bit, however, Tyrone emerges inside the towel and again tries to attack his puppeteer. Jason finally manages to restrain Tyrone to a table and grabs a hammer to try to bludgeon the puppet to death, but Tyrone keeps reviving with each blow. Margery reenters just as Jason tries to use the claw of the hammer on his hand and tries to stop him, causing her own hand to be impaled. Horrified, Jason rushes to help her, and Tyrone does not revive when he handles the towel again. As the two leave the basement arm-in-arm for a hospital, Margery insists Jason tell her if Tyrone comes back, and she will be there for him.

=== Epilogue ===
However, Tyrone emerges one last time from the shadows without Jason's help, now much larger and more demented looking than before. He mocks the audience for having enjoyed his presence, likening it to humanity's own feelings for the devil, which has led them to target the innocent, like sheep, lambs, babies, and eventually, Jesus, all as a way to shift the blame for their demons. He suggests one day a savior like Jesus will get all of humanity to cooperate, but laughs it off. “The thing about a savior is you never know where to look. Might just be the place you saw the devil before.”

== Cast ==
Original Broadway Cast:

- Steven Boyer as Jason/Tyrone
- Geneva Carr as Margery
- Michael Oberholtzer as Timmy
- Sarah Stiles as Jessica
- Marc Kudisch as Pastor Greg

On November 3, 2015 Bob Saget replaced Marc Kudisch as Pastor Greg.

Original London Cast:

- Harry Melling as Jason/Tyrone
- Janie Dee as Margery
- Kevin Mains as Timmy
- Jemima Rooper as Jessica
- Neil Pearson as Pastor Greg

== Awards and nominations ==
=== Original Production ===
Year	Award Ceremony	Category	Nominee	Result
2014	Off Broadway Alliance Award	Best New Play		Won
2014	Lucille Lortel Award	Outstanding Lead Actor in a Play	Steven Boyer	Won
2015	Tony Awards	Best Play		Nominated
2015	Tony Awards	Best Performance by a Leading Actor in a Play	Steven Boyer	Nominated
2015	Tony Awards	Best Performance by a Leading Actress in a Play	Geneva Carr	Nominated
2015	Tony Awards	Best Performance by a Featured Actress in a Play	Sarah Stiles	Nominated
2015	Tony Awards	Best Direction of a Play	Moritz von Stuelpnagel	Nominated

=== Original West End Production ===
Year	Award Ceremony	Category	Nominee	Result
2016	Laurence Olivier Awards	Best Entertainment or Comedy Play		Nominated
