= 59 Productions =

Production company

59 Studio
- Industry: Specialist Design
- Founder: Leo Warner (co-founder Mark Grimmer)
- Headquarters: London, United Kingdom
- Number of employees: 35
- Website: www.59productions.co.uk

Fifty-Nine Studio (59 Studio) is a design studio with offices located in London and New York City.

== Origins ==
59 Studio was founded in Edinburgh by Leo Warner (shortly joined by co-founder Mark Grimmer). Their early public projects were largely video-led designs for theatre, and included video designs for Stellar Quines Theatre Company's Sweet Fanny Adams in Eden in 2003, and video designs for the then recently formed National Theatre of Scotland's Roam and Black Watch in 2006, which was featured at the Edinburgh Festival Fringe and won several awards.

59 Studio relocated to London, where they began a series of collaborations at the Royal National Theatre. Critics at The Guardian commented that with an adaptation of The Waves that they worked on, the team had "created an entirely new art form".

Warner and Grimmer were part of the original creative team for War Horse in 2007, which won several Laurence Olivier Awards in London and five Tony Awards for its subsequent production on Broadway.

59 Studio worked on its first opera in 2007 at the English National Opera, providing the projection design for Philip Glass's Satyagraha, directed by Phelim McDermott and co-directed/designed by Julian Crouch, both of the theatre company, Improbable. This was the first of several collaborations with Improbable, including the design for the Metropolitan Opera's 125th Anniversary Gala in 2009, which raised over $10 million.

In 2012, director Danny Boyle asked 59 Studio to provide the animation and projection design for the opening ceremony of the 2012 Summer Olympics, which was viewed by over a billion people. They also led the design of the David Bowie exhibition for the Victoria and Albert Museum. The company was commissioned for the Light the Sails project at the Sydney Opera House for the 2014 Vivid Sydney Festival. In 2015, they were responsible for the projection design for the first-ever Broadway production of George Gershwin's An American in Paris. The production won four Tony Awards, including Best Scenic Design of a Musical for Bob Crowley and 59 Studio.

In 2017, the company developed and produced its first production. It was an adaptation of Paul Auster's City of Glass, written by Duncan Macmillan. City of Glass was a co-production with the Lyric Hammersmith, HOME arts center, and Karl Sydow. The production was described by The Daily Telegraph as a "neo-noir thriller that rewrites the rulebook for theatre design."

In 2018, 59 Studio provided both the set and projection design for The Last Ship, a musical by Sting that tells the story of shipbuilding in North East England. The production opened at Northern Stage before embarking on a UK tour. Other projects include the design of Marnie, an opera by Nico Muhly that transferred to the Metropolitan Opera after an initial run at the English National Opera in London. The company also designed events in 2018 for both the first night of the BBC Proms at the Royal Albert Hall and the Edinburgh International Festival.

Alongside their work on the stage, 59 Studio made two virtual reality films in 2018: Grenfell: Our Home, a collaboration with Parable and Channel 4 that won the Audience Award at Sheffield DocFest, and Nothing To Be Written, which was commissioned by the BBC and won Best UK Experience and two other awards at the Raindance Film Festival. In November 2018, Deep Field, their film collaboration with composer Eric Whitacre and NASA, premiered at the Kennedy Space Center.

== Selected productions ==
- 2018—The Shadow Factory. Set design and projection design for a new play by Howard Brenton at Nuffield Theatre Southampton.
- 2018—Array. Animated artwork projection mapped onto the interior of Beech Street Tunnel in Barbican Centre, London, set to Karawane by composer Esa-Pekka Salonen.
- 2017—Reflections. Animated artwork projected onto the Guggenheim Museum Bilbao as part of the museum's 20th birthday celebrations.
- 2014—Lighting the Sails. At the Sydney Opera House for the VIVID Live festival. Commissioned to create a bespoke animated film for projection onto the roof of the Sydney Opera House. It traced the evolution of the building from its design and construction.
- 2014—Hedwig and the Angry Inch. At the Belasco Theatre, starring Neil Patrick Harris. 59 Studio' Ben Pearcy designed projections.
- 2014—Les Misérables. At the Imperial Theatre. Projections inspired by Victor Hugo's watercolors for a new production of the musical.
- 2009—Al gran sole carico d'amore. At the Salzburg Festival. Katie Mitchell directed Luigi Nono's opera with Leo Warner, creating a "live film" production in which action on stage and visual effects were created, shot, and edited live, and relayed to a cinema screen above the stage.
- 2006—Roam. By Grid Iron Theatre Company at the Edinburgh Airport. 59 Studio created CG and film content and designed the technical systems for the delivery of video in this show. It included a mock-up of a live news report describing Edinburgh's descent into civil war.

== Selected tours ==
- 2011–2014—War Horse. After a successful run at the Royal National Theatre, the production won five Tony Awards on Broadway, including Best Play and Best Design. The show also toured in the UK, Ireland, North America, Netherlands, Germany, and South Africa.
- 2010—Jónsi Go Live World Tour. 59 Studio conceived, designed, and produced the stage show for Jónsi's 2010 tour of North America, Europe, Australia, and Japan.
- 2009–2014—Les Misérables. The new, redesigned version of the musical toured the UK, Japan, South Korea, Spain, and Australia.
- 2008—The Waves. Started at the Royal National Theatre. It toured the UK, North America, and Europe.
- 2006–2011—Black Watch. Started at the National Theatre of Scotland. It went on to tour the UK, the United States, Canada, Australia, and New Zealand.
