= Steven Boyer =

American actor, comedian, and musician

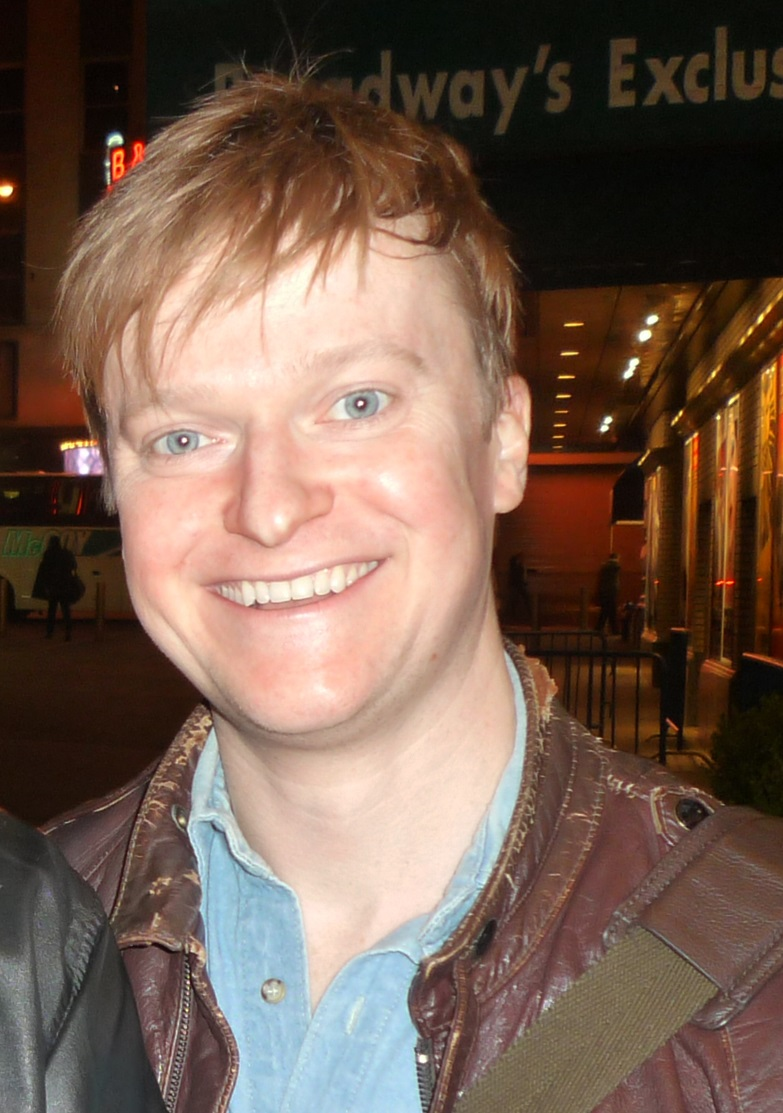
- Boyer in 2015
- Other name: Steve Boyer
- Education: Juilliard School (BFA)
- Occupations: Actor, comedian, musician
- Years active: 2002–present
- Notable work: Hand to God

Steven Boyer (also known as Steve Boyer, born February 15, 1979) is an American stage and television actor, comedian, and musician, from Westerville, Ohio. He is best known for originating the role of Jason/Tyrone in Hand to God Off-Broadway and in the Broadway production. This role earned him a Tony nomination for Best Leading Actor in a Play. He played the role of Dwayne Reed in the NBC sitcom Trial & Error, with John Lithgow, as well as ADC Jerry Gorsch on Chicago Fire. He played a minor role in Martin Scorsese's The Wolf of Wall Street alongside Leonardo DiCaprio. He has also played several small parts in television, including The Good Wife, Law & Order, and Orange Is the New Black.

== Life and career ==
Boyer went to Westerville North High School. He also spent time at Columbus Junior Theatre, in his youth. He graduated from The Juilliard School, Drama Division in 2001 where he received the Michel Saint‐Denis Award for outstanding graduate.

In 2014, the Actors’ Equity Association awarded him the Clarence Derwent Award.

In 2005, when acting roles dried up, Boyer toured colleges, universities, and venues as a stand-up comic.

Boyer also plays lead guitar in a rock band, The U.S. Open, with fellow NBC actor William Jackson Harper on drums.

== Filmography ==
=== Film ===
Title	Year	Role	Notes
Dead Sexy	2003	Whitey	Short film
Here's What I Like: Fruit. And Now I'll Tell You Why	2009	Coconut Hipster	Short film
Did You Hear About the Morgans?	2009	U.S. Marshal Ferber	
Night Home	2010	Australian #1	Short film
We Both Smoke	2010	David	Short film
Inconvenient Interviews with Risa	2011	Interviewee	Short film
The Brooklyn Brothers Beat the Best	2011	Fibber	
The Wolf of Wall Street	2013	Investor's Center Broker #1	
Listen Up Philip	2014	Parker	
Mary and Louise	2014	Roguish Gentleman #3	Short film
Bridge of Spies	2015	Marty	
Christmas Crime	2017	Hank	Short film
Hustlers	2019	Doug	
Borderlands	2024	Scooter	

=== Television ===
Title	Year	Role	Notes
Law & Order	2002	Scott Purdy	Episode: "Missing"
Ed	2004	Mugger	Episode: "Pressure Points"
Law & Order	2008	Sonny	Episode: "Tango"
Law & Order	2009	Sal Jerome	Episode: "Human Flesh Search Engine"
Person of Interest	2011	Lead Dealer	Episode: "Witness"
The Share	2012	Nathan	Television film Also producer
Louie	2012	Young Pharmacy Employee	Episode: "Ikea/Piano Lesson"
Annie Sunbeam and Friends	2013	Fred	Episode: "Introduction"
The Crazy Ones	2014	Squirrel	Episode: "The Face of a Winner"
Orange Is the New Black	2014	Shady Jay the Super	2 episodes
Happyish	2015	30 year old Julius	Unaired Pilot
High Maintenance	2015	Corey	Episode: "Sabrina"
The Adventures of Jamel: The Time Traveling B-Boy	2015	John Wilkes Booth	Episode: "Sockdolager"
The Good Wife	2015	Tim Brewster	Episode: "Driven"
Deadbeat	2016	Hawk Smith	Episode: "Hawk Smith"
Mom	2016	Dave	Episode: "A Catheter and a Dipsy-Doodle"
Who Is?	2017	(voice)	
Trial & Error	2017–2018	Dwayne Reed	Main role
The Blacklist	2018	Stephen Altman	Episode: "The Invisible Hand (No. 63)"
Chicago Fire	2018–2020	Jerry Gorsch	Recurring role
FBI: Most Wanted	2020	Tyler Kane	Episode: "Reveille"
FBI	2020	Tyler Kane	Episode: "American Dreams"
Prodigal Son	2021	Ashton Colter	Episode: "The Killabustas"
Love Life	2021	Josh	5 episodes
WeCrashed	2022	Matthew	4 episodes

== Stage ==
Title	Year	Role	Notes
I'm Not Rappaport	2002	Gilley	Booth Theatre
Richard III	2007	Marquis of Dorset / Murderer / Bishop of Ely	Classic Stage Company
Misalliance	2009	Bentley Summerhays	New York City Center
The Coward	2010	Robert Blithe	The Duke on 42nd Street
The School for Lies	2011	Dubois and Basque	Classic Stage Company
Modern Terrorism, or They Who Want to Kill Us and How We Learn to Love Them	2012	Jerome	Second Stage Theatre
The Explorers Club	2013	Professor Walling	New York City Center
Hand to God	2014	Jason / Tyrone	Lucille Lortel Theatre
King Lear	2014	Fool	Delacorte Theater
Hand to God	2015–16	Jason / Tyrone	Booth Theatre
Time and the Conways	2017	Ernest Beevers	American Airlines Theater
Kimberly Akimbo	2021–22	Buddy	Linda Gross Theater
Kimberly Akimbo	2022-24	Buddy	Booth Theatre
Mother Russia	2026	Dmitri	Signature Theatre Company
Are You Now or Have You Ever Been	2026	Man 3 (Ring Lardner Jr., José Ferrer, Jerome Robbins, Marc Lawrence)	New York City Center Stage I
