= Max von Essen =

American actor

- Born: January 11, 1974 (age 52); Long Island, New York, U.S.
- Education: South Side High School
- Alma mater: University of North Carolina at Chapel Hill
- Occupations: Actor, singer
- Years active: 1997–present
- Notable work: An American in Paris
- Parent(s): Thomas Von Essen (father); Rita Von Essen (mother)
- Relatives: Von Essen family

Max von Essen (born January 11, 1974) is an American actor and singer. His Broadway credits include roles in An American in Paris (of which he was nominated for a Tony Award for), Anastasia, Evita, and Chicago. He also starred as Marvin in the United States national tour of Falsettos.

== Life and career ==
Raised on Long Island, von Essen is a graduate of South Side High School in Rockville Centre, New York. He attended the University of North Carolina at Chapel Hill, and after graduation toured with Liza Minnelli. He is a member of the Von Essen family, who are part of the German and Swedish nobility. A son of Rita and Thomas Von Essen, who was the New York City Fire Commissioner during the 9/11 terrorist attacks on the World Trade Center, he is the youngest of four children. He is openly gay.

He toured Europe in West Side Story and was a cast member of the U.S. national tour of Chicago. He made his Broadway debut in Jesus Christ Superstar in 2000 as Disciple and Jesus of Nazareth understudy. He appeared in Les Misérables on Broadway as the replacement for Fauchelevent and other roles, and starred in Dance of the Vampires alongside Michael Crawford in 2002. He played the role of student revolutionary leader Enjolras (replacement) in the Les Misérables Broadway revival in 2006 at the Broadhurst Theater.

In 2006, he was a soloist at the biggest Andrew Lloyd Webber musical gala to date, held in Tallinn, Estonia. He performed in the national tour of Xanadu as "Sonny" in 2008 and in the Roundabout Theater Company Off-Broadway production of Maury Yeston's Death Takes a Holiday at the Laura Pels Theatre in 2011. In 2015, von Essen played the role of Parisian aristocrat Henri in the Broadway production of An American in Paris, for which he received a Tony Award for Best Featured Actor in a Musical nomination.

== Film and television ==
Year	Title	Role	Notes
2005	Brooklyn Lobster	Piano Player	
2009	The Beautiful Life: TBL	Scott	1 episode
2010	Sex and the City 2	Wedding Chorus	
2011-14	Submissions Only	Cameron Dante	Netflix series, 14 episodes
2012	Gossip Girl	Father Smythe	2 episodes
2012	Royal Pains	Hair	1 episode
2013-14	The Good Wife	Stephen Delaney	2 episodes
2014	Blonde	Man	Short
2014	Seven Lovers	Dan	
2015	The Intern	Businessman at Starbucks #1	
2022	Family Guy	Cruise Director, Waiter (voices)	2 episodes
2024	Law & Order	Rhett Richards	Episode: "Family Ties"
2025	Dexter: Resurrection	Keith Bauer / The Canton Clubber	Episode: "Camera Shy"

== Theatre credits ==
=== Broadway ===
Source: Internet Broadway Database

Year(s)	Production	Role	Location
2000	Jesus Christ Superstar	Disciple; u/s Jesus Christ	Ford Center for the Performing Arts
2002	Dance of the Vampires	Alfred	Minskoff Theatre
2003	Les Misérables	Fauchelevent / Jean Prouvaire / Ensemble; u/s Marius Pontmercy (replacement)	Imperial Theatre
2007–2008	Les Misérables	Enjolras (replacement)	Broadhurst Theatre
2012	Evita	Agustin Magaldi; u/s Che	Marquis Theatre
2012	Evita	Che (replacement)	Marquis Theatre
2012–2013	Evita	Agustin Magaldi; u/s Che	Marquis Theatre
2015–2016	An American in Paris	Henri Baurel	Palace Theatre
2017–2018	Anastasia	Gleb Vaganov (replacement)	Broadhurst Theatre
2023–2024	Chicago	Billy Flynn (replacement)	Ambassador Theatre
2024–2025	Chicago	Billy Flynn (replacement)	Ambassador Theatre
2026	Chicago	Billy Flynn (replacement)	Ambassador Theatre

=== National and international tours ===
Year(s)	Production	Role
1997	Liza Minnelli in Concert	Ensemble
1998	West Side Story (European tour)	Tony
1999	Chicago	Mary Sunshine
2008	Xanadu	Sonny
2019	Falsettos	Marvin

=== Off-Broadway ===
Year(s)	Production	Role	Location
1999	The Fantasticks	Matt	Sullivan Street Playhouse
2001	John & Paul	Unknown	New Victory Theater
2004	Finian's Rainbow	Woody Mahoney	Irish Repertory Theatre
2011	Death Takes a Holiday	Corrado Montelli	Laura Pels Theatre (Roundabout Theatre Company)
2011	Hello Again	The Soldier	Transport Group
2016	The Secret Garden	Dr. Neville Craven	Lucille Lortel Theatre
2017	Yours Unfaithfully	Stephen Meredith	Beckett Theatre (Mint Theater Company)

=== Regional ===
Year(s)	Production	Role	Location
1997	A Christmas Carol	Unknown	Mill Mountain Theatre
1999	Jesus Christ Superstar	Unknown	Connecticut Repertory Theatre
2001	Blood Brothers	Eddie	Downtown Cabaret Theatre (Bridgeport, Connecticut)
2001	Hair	Claude	Bay Street Theatre
2002	My Fair Lady	Freddy Eynsford-Hill	Paper Mill Playhouse
2003	My Fair Lady	Freddy Eynsford-Hill	Pittsburgh Civic Light Opera
2003	Joseph and the Amazing Technicolor Dreamcoat	Joseph	Sacramento Music Circus
2003	Children of Eden	Abel/Ham	The York Theatre Company
2004	Auntie Mame		Bay Street Theatre
2004	Auntie Mame		Ogunquit Playhouse
2004	Jesus Christ Superstar	Jesus Christ	Sacramento Music Circus
2004	Dorian	Dorian	NoHo Arts Center (North Hollywood, CA)
2005	Cabaret	The Emcee	Sacramento Music Circus
2005	The Baker's Wife	Dominique	Paper Mill Playhouse
2005	The Secret Garden	Captain Albert Lennox	Manhattan Center
2006	Mame	Patrick	The Kennedy Center
2006	West Side Story	Tony	Theatre Under the Stars
2008	West Side Story	Tony	Pittsburgh Civic Light Opera
2008	Sweeney Todd: The Demon Barber of Fleet Street	Anthony Hope	Sacramento Music Circus
2010	Joseph and the Amazing Technicolor Dreamcoat	Joseph	Sacramento Music Circus
2013	My Fair Lady	Freddy Eynsford-Hill	Kennedy Center
2014	An American in Paris	Henri Baurel	Théâtre du Châtelet
2022	The Secret Garden	Archibald Craven	UC Davis Health Pavilion
2022	42nd Street	Julian Marsh	Goodspeed Musicals
2025	An American in Paris	Henri Baurel	Grand Théâtre de Genève
2026	Brigadoon	Tommy Albright	Pasadena Playhouse

== Awards and nominations ==
Source: IBDB

Year	Award Ceremony	Category	Show	Result
2015	Tony Award	Best Featured Actor in a Musical	An American in Paris	Nominated
2015	Drama Desk Award	Outstanding Featured Actor in a Musical	An American in Paris	Nominated
2015	Outer Critics Circle Award	Outstanding Featured Actor in a Musical	An American in Paris	Nominated
2015	Broadway.com Audience Choice Award	Favorite Featured Actor in a Musical	An American in Paris	Nominated
