= Jeff Mahshie =

American costume designer

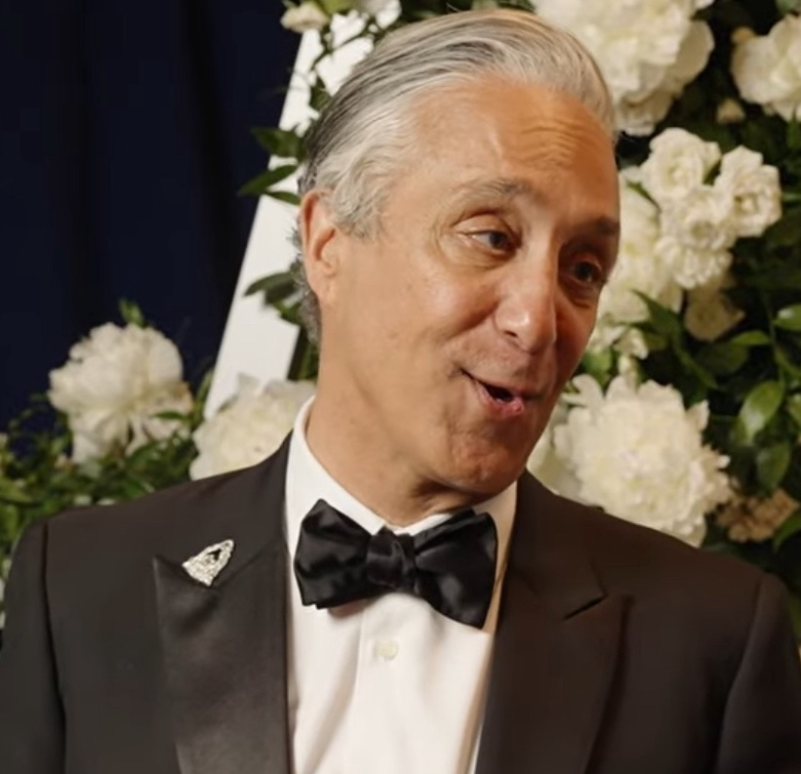
- Mahshie in 2026
- Occupation: Costume designer

Jeff Mahshie is an American costume designer. He won a Tony Award and was nominated for another one in the category Best Costume Design for the musical She Loves Me and the play Fallen Angels.
