= Christian puppetry =

Religious puppetry

Christian puppetry is a form of Christian ministry and entertainment through puppetry.

== Techniques ==
Blacklight Puppet

Though rod-arm puppetry continues to be the most common technique in Christian circles, some other forms have begun to gain popularity.

=== Blacklight puppetry ===
Blacklight puppetry capitalizes on the novelty of ultra-violet lights, or black light. Lighting the staging area with only these specialized lights, the audience can see only the objects that are coated with a special paint. The idea of controlling what the audience sees is a major responsibility of any puppeteer, and blacklight has provided a new way of accomplishing it.

=== Dowel rods ===
Dowel rod puppetry combines interpretive dance and the use of (typically) two simple dowels. Routines usually involve a song that tells a story or conveys a message while performers move in a choreographed dance, employing their rods in equally choreographed ways.
