= Matt Harrington (actor) =

American actor

- Born: November 17, 1981 (age 44); San Diego, California, U.S.
- Education: New York University (MFA)
- Occupation: Actor

Matt Harrington (born November 17, 1981) is an American stage actor, best known for his work in the Broadway production of Matilda the Musical, in which he replaced Tony Award winner Gabriel Ebert in the role of Mr. Wormwood.

== Biography ==
Harrington was born and raised in San Diego, California. He holds an MFA from NYU's Graduate Acting Program.

== Career ==
Harrington made his Broadway debut understudying in the Roundabout Theatre Company production of Harvey, starring Jim Parsons. He is a founding member of Wheelhouse Theater Company. In addition to his work on Broadway, Harrington has appeared at numerous theaters across the country, including Philadelphia Theatre Company, Berkshire Theatre Festival, TheatreWorks Palo Alto, Weston Playhouse, Syracuse Stage, and Portland Stage Company. His television credits include The Good Wife, Boardwalk Empire, Gravity, and Bored to Death.

Prior to performing in Matilda, Harrington was the only American actor to appear on stage in both productions of the critically acclaimed Broadway repertory of Twelfth Night and Richard III, starring Mark Rylance, at the Belasco Theatre. The productions originated at Shakespeare's Globe in London and ultimately transferred to Broadway after a successful West End run. Since its opening in 2019, Harrington has performed the role of Chris Bean in the New York production of The Play That Goes Wrong.
