= Leanne Cope =

British dancer, actress and singer

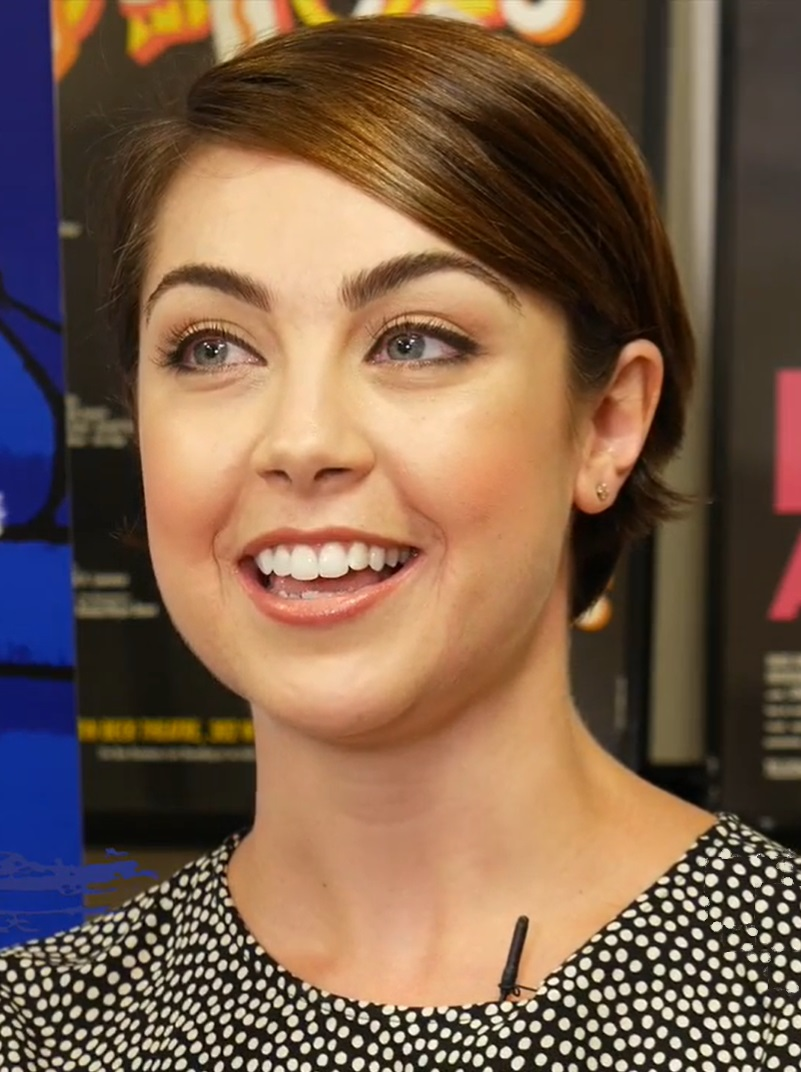
- Cope in 2016
- Born: 13 September 1983 (age 42); Bath, England
- Occupations: Ballet dancer; Actress
- Spouse: Paul Kay
- Children: 3

Leanne Michelle Cope (born September 13, 1983) is an English ballet dancer and theatre actress. She achieved prominence as First Artist for The Royal Ballet, after training in the Royal Ballet School and graduating in 2003.

In 2015, she originated the role of Lise Dassin in the original Broadway production of An American in Paris, a role originated in film by Leslie Caron. She had previously played the role in the Théâtre du Châtelet. Her performance was critically acclaimed, and Cope received both Drama Desk and Tony Award nominations for Best Actress in a Leading Role in a Musical.

== Early life and education ==
Cope was born in Bath, and began dancing at the age of five. She first trained at The Dorothy Colebourn School of Dance before joining The Royal Ballet Lower School at the age of 11, and started taking ballet seriously at the age of 15.

== Acting career ==
After graduating, Cope became a dancer for The Royal Ballet, and in 2009 she became First Artist of the company. The choreographer Liam Scarlett called her "a presence on stage like no other".

In 2014, while dancing in The Royal Ballet's Swan Lake, Cope was spotted by Christopher Wheeldon, who was looking for a leading actress for his stage version of the film An American in Paris. Having heard that Cope sang at school, Wheeldon asked her to sing for him. Cope sang "The Man I Love", and was cast in the role of Lise. While preparing for the role, she met with Leslie Caron, who originated the role of Lise in the 1951 film, to discuss the character. The show, also starring Robert Fairchild as Jerry, opened on 12 April, and Cope received praise for her performance. In a review, David Rooney from The Hollywood Reporter wrote that Cope "has delicacy and charm; she's a confident singer, and while there's only a passing physical resemblance, her diminutive size and that chic French bob subtly recall Caron." In 2016, it was announced that An American in Paris will be heading to the West End, with both Fairchild and Cope reprising their roles. The musical began previews on 4 March 2017.

== Awards and nominations ==
Year	Award	Work	Outcome
2015	Drama Desk Award for Outstanding Actress in a Leading Role in a Musical	An American in Paris	Nominated
2015	Tony Award for Best Actress in a Leading Role in a Musical	An American in Paris	Nominated
2015	Drama League Award for Distinguished Performance	An American in Paris	Nominated
2015	Outer Critics Circle Award for Outstanding Actress in a Leading Role in a Musical	An American in Paris	Nominated
2015	Fred and Adele Astaire Award for Best Female Dancer	An American in Paris	Won
2015	Dorothy Loudon Award for Excellence	An American in Paris	Won
2016	Grammy Award for Best Musical Theater Album	An American in Paris	Nominated

== See also ==
- List of British actors
