= 47th Tony Awards =

1993 US theatrical awards ceremony

- Official poster for the 47th annual Tony Awards
- Date: June 6, 1993
- Location: Gershwin Theatre, New York City, New York
- Hosted by: Liza Minnelli
- Most wins: Kiss of the Spider Woman (7)
- Most nominations: Kiss of the Spider Woman and The Who's Tommy (11)

Television/radio coverage
- Network: CBS

The 47th Annual Tony Awards was broadcast by CBS from the Gershwin Theatre in New York City on June 6, 1993. The host was Liza Minnelli.

== Eligibility ==
Shows that opened on Broadway during the 1992–1993 season before May 5, 1993 are eligible.

Original plays

- Angels in America: Millennium Approaches
- Chinese Coffee
- Face Value
- The Fifteen Minute Hamlet
- Fool Moon
- The Real Inspector Hound
- Redwood Curtain
- Shakespeare for My Father
- The Sisters Rosensweig
- Solitary Confinement
- Someone Who'll Watch Over Me
- The Song of Jacob Zulu

Original musicals

- Ain't Broadway Grand
- Anna Karenina
- Blood Brothers
- The Goodbye Girl
- Gypsy Passion
- Kiss of the Spider Woman
- My Favorite Year
- Oba Oba '93
- Tango Pasion
- 3 from Brooklyn
- The Who's Tommy

Play revivals

- Anna Christie
- Candida
- A Christmas Carol
- The Happy Journey to Trenton and Camden
- The Long Christmas Dinner
- The Price
- Saint Joan
- Salome
- The Seagull
- The Show Off
- Three Men on a Horse
- Wilder, Wilder, Wilder

== The ceremony ==
The theme of the ceremony was to commemorate the 100th anniversary of theatre in Times Square, and the telecast opened with a new song, "Celebrate Broadway." The musical presentation was a "Sisters Medley" with sisters Liza Minnelli and Lorna Luft. The finale was Oklahoma!, with 1993 Tony Award winners and Company.

Presenters: Bea Arthur, Tom Bosley, Matthew Broderick, Ellen Burstyn, Diahann Carroll, Michael Crawford, Tyne Daly, Tammy Grimes, Marvin Hamlisch, Julie Harris, Gregory Hines, James Earl Jones, Agnes de Mille, Amanda Plummer, Jonathan Pryce, Mercedes Ruehl, Ron Silver, Lily Tomlin, Tommy Tune, Ben Vereen.

Performers: Barry Bostwick, Liza Minnelli, Bill Irwin, David Shiner, and cast members from Cats; Crazy For You; Falsettos, Guys and Dolls; Jelly's Last Jam; The Will Rogers Follies.

Musicals and Plays represented:

- Blood Brothers (Medley - Company);
- The Goodbye Girl ("Paula" - Bernadette Peters and Martin Short);
- Kiss of the Spider Woman - The Musical ("Where You Are" - Brent Carver, Chita Rivera and Company);
- The Who's Tommy (Medley - Company);
- Angels in America: Millennium Approaches (Scene with Ron Leibman and Kathleen Chalfant);
- The Sisters Rosensweig (Scene with Jane Alexander, Madeline Kahn and Robert Klein);
- Someone Who'll Watch Over Me (Scene with Michael York and David Dukes);
- The Song of Jacob Zulu (Scene with K. Todd Freeman).

== Award winners and nominees ==
Winners are in bold

Best Play	Best Musical
**Angels in America: Millennium Approaches – Tony Kushner**; The Sisters Rosensweig – Wendy Wasserstein; Someone Who'll Watch Over Me – Frank McGuinness; The Song of Jacob Zulu – Tug Yourgrau	**Kiss of the Spider Woman**; Blood Brothers; The Goodbye Girl; The Who's Tommy
Best Revival of a Play	Best Book of a Musical
**Anna Christie**; The Price; Saint Joan; Wilder, Wilder, Wilder	**Terrence McNally – Kiss of the Spider Woman**; Peter Kellogg – Anna Karenina; Willy Russell – Blood Brothers; Pete Townshend and Des McAnuff – The Who's Tommy
Best Performance by a Leading Actor in a Play	Best Performance by a Leading Actress in a Play
**Ron Leibman – Angels in America: Millennium Approaches as Roy Cohn**; K. Todd Freeman – The Song of Jacob Zulu as Jacob Zulu; Liam Neeson – Anna Christie as Mat Burke; Stephen Rea – Someone Who'll Watch Over Me as Edward	**Madeline Kahn – The Sisters Rosensweig as Gorgeous Teitelbaum**; Jane Alexander – The Sisters Rosensweig as Sara Goode; Lynn Redgrave – Shakespeare for My Father as Herself; Natasha Richardson – Anna Christie as Anna Christopherson
Best Performance by a Leading Actor in a Musical	Best Performance by a Leading Actress in a Musical
**Brent Carver – Kiss of the Spider Woman as Luis Molina**; Tim Curry – My Favorite Year as Alan Swann; Con O'Neill – Blood Brothers as Mickey; Martin Short – The Goodbye Girl as Elliot Garfield	**Chita Rivera – Kiss of the Spider Woman as Aurora/Spider Woman**; Ann Crumb – Anna Karenina as Anna Karenina; Stephanie Lawrence – Blood Brothers as Mrs. Johnstone; Bernadette Peters – The Goodbye Girl as Paula McFadden
Best Performance by a Featured Actor in a Play	Best Performance by a Featured Actress in a Play
**Stephen Spinella – Angels in America: Millennium Approaches as Prior Walter**; Robert Sean Leonard – Candida as Eugene Marchbanks; Joe Mantello – Angels in America: Millennium Approaches as Louis Ironson; Zakes Mokae – The Song of Jacob Zulu as Rev. Zulu/Mr. X, Itshe	**Debra Monk – Redwood Curtain as Geneva**; Kathleen Chalfant – Angels in America: Millennium Approaches as Hannah Pitt/Various Characters; Marcia Gay Harden – Angels in America: Millennium Approaches as Harper Pitt/Martin Heller; Anne Meara – Anna Christie as Marthy Owen
Best Performance by a Featured Actor in a Musical	Best Performance by a Featured Actress in a Musical
**Anthony Crivello – Kiss of the Spider Woman as Valentin**; Michael Cerveris – The Who's Tommy as Tommy; Gregg Edelman – Anna Karenina as Constantine Levin; Paul Kandel – The Who's Tommy as Uncle Ernie	**Andrea Martin – My Favorite Year as Alice Miller**; Jan Graveson – Blood Brothers as Linda; Lainie Kazan – My Favorite Year as Belle Steinberg Carroca; Marcia Mitzman – The Who's Tommy as Mrs. Walker
Best Original Score (Music and/or Lyrics) Written for the Theatre	Best Choreography
**Kiss of the Spider Woman – John Kander (music) and Fred Ebb (lyrics)**; **The Who's Tommy – Pete Townshend (music and lyrics)**; Anna Karenina – Daniel Levine (music) and Peter Kellogg (lyrics); The Song of Jacob Zulu – Ladysmith Black Mambazo (music and lyrics) and Tug Yourgrau (lyrics)	**Wayne Cilento – The Who's Tommy**; Graciela Daniele – The Goodbye Girl; Vincent Paterson and Rob Marshall – Kiss of the Spider Woman; Randy Skinner – Ain't Broadway Grand
Best Direction of a Play	Best Direction of a Musical
**George C. Wolfe – Angels in America: Millennium Approaches**; David Leveaux – Anna Christie; Eric Simonson – The Song of Jacob Zulu; Daniel J. Sullivan – The Sisters Rosensweig	**Des McAnuff – The Who's Tommy**; Bill Kenwright and Bob Tomson – Blood Brothers; Michael Kidd – The Goodbye Girl; Harold Prince – Kiss of the Spider Woman
Best Scenic Design	Best Costume Design
**John Arnone – The Who's Tommy**; John Lee Beatty – Redwood Curtain; Jerome Sirlin – Kiss of the Spider Woman; Robin Wagner – Angels in America: Millennium Approaches	**Florence Klotz – Kiss of the Spider Woman**; Jane Greenwood – The Sisters Rosensweig; Erin Quigley – The Song of Jacob Zulu; David C. Woolard – The Who's Tommy
Best Lighting Design
**Chris Parry – The Who's Tommy**; Howell Binkley – Kiss of the Spider Woman; Jules Fisher – Angels in America: Millennium Approaches; Dennis Parichy – Redwood Curtain

== Special awards ==
- Regional Theatre Award - La Jolla Playhouse
- Special Tony Award - Oklahoma! (50th Anniversary)
- Tony Honor
  - IATSE (International Alliance of Theatrical Stage Employees)
  - Broadway Cares/Equity Fights AIDS

=== Multiple nominations and awards ===
These productions had multiple nominations:

- 11 nominations: Kiss of the Spider Woman and The Who's Tommy
- 9 nominations: Angels in America: Millennium Approaches
- 6 nominations: Blood Brothers and The Song of Jacob Zulu
- 5 nominations: Anna Christie, The Goodbye Girl and The Sisters Rosensweig
- 4 nominations: Anna Karenina
- 3 nominations: My Favorite Year and Redwood Curtain
- 2 nominations: Someone Who'll Watch Over Me

The following productions received multiple awards.

- 7 wins: Kiss of the Spider Woman
- 5 wins: The Who's Tommy
- 4 wins: Angels in America: Millennium Approaches

== See also ==
- Drama Desk Awards
- 1993 Laurence Olivier Awards – equivalent awards for West End theatre productions
- Obie Award
- New York Drama Critics' Circle
- Theatre World Award
- Lucille Lortel Awards
