= Tony Award for Best Original Score =

American theatre award for Broadway scores

- Awarded for: Best Original Score
- Location: United States New York City
- Presented by: American Theatre Wing The Broadway League
- Currently held by: Cinco Paul for Schmigadoon! (2026)
- Website: TonyAwards.com

The Tony Award for Best Original Score is the Tony Award given to the composers and lyricists of the best original score written for a musical or play in that year. The score consists of music and/or lyrics. To be eligible, a score must be written specifically for the theatre and must be original; compilations of non-theatrical music or compilations of earlier theatrical music are not eligible for consideration.

== History ==
The award has undergone a number of minor changes. In 1947, 1950, 1951, and 1962, the award went to the composer only. Otherwise, the award has gone to the composer and lyricist for their combined contributions, except for 1971 when the two awards were split (although Stephen Sondheim won both, for Company).

The only tie in this category occurred in 1993, when Fred Ebb & John Kander (Kiss of the Spider Woman) and Pete Townshend (The Who's Tommy) shared the award.

In only ten years have non-musical plays been nominated for Tony Awards in this category: Much Ado About Nothing in 1973; The Good Doctor in 1974; The Song of Jacob Zulu in 1993; Twelfth Night in 1999; Enron and Fences in 2010; Peter and the Starcatcher and One Man, Two Guvnors in 2012; Angels in America in 2018; To Kill a Mockingbird in 2019; A Christmas Carol, The Inheritance, The Rose Tattoo, Slave Play, and The Sound Inside in 2020; and Stereophonic in 2024. Because the Broadway season of 2019-2020 was shortened due to the COVID-19 pandemic, only four musicals were eligible for Tony Awards; three were jukebox musicals and the fourth was The Lightning Thief, the only musical of the season with original music. The Lightning Thief was not nominated for any Tony Awards, meaning that every nominee in this category in 2020 was a play rather than a musical.

In 2013, Cyndi Lauper became the first woman to win the award solo for Kinky Boots. In 2015, Lisa Kron and Jeanine Tesori became the first all-woman team to win the award for Fun Home.

Toby Marlow is the youngest person to win the award; they were 27 when they won in tandem with Lucy Moss for SIX: The Musical. Adolph Green is the oldest person to win the award; he was 76 when he won for The Will Rogers Follies. If T. S. Eliot had been alive when he won for Cats, he would have been 94. Eliot is one of two people to receive the award posthumously, the other being Jonathan Larson, who won for Rent. He would have been 36.

== Winners and nominees ==
indicates the winner

=== 1940s ===
Year	Musical	Music	Lyrics
1947 (1st)
1947 (1st)	Street Scene	Kurt Weill	Langston Hughes
1949 (3rd)
1949 (3rd)	Kiss Me, Kate	Cole Porter	

=== 1950s ===
Year	Musical	Music	Lyrics
1950 (4th)
1950 (4th)	South Pacific	Richard Rodgers	Oscar Hammerstein II
1951 (5th)
1951 (5th)	Call Me Madam	Irving Berlin	

=== 1960s ===
Year	Musical	Music	Lyrics
1962 (16th)
1962 (16th)	No Strings	Richard Rodgers	
1962 (16th)	How to Succeed in Business Without Really Trying	Frank Loesser	
1962 (16th)	Kwamina	Richard Adler	
1962 (16th)	Milk and Honey	Jerry Herman	
1963 (17th)
1963 (17th)	Oliver!	Lionel Bart	
1963 (17th)	Bravo Giovanni	Milton Schafer	Ronny Graham
1963 (17th)	Little Me	Cy Coleman	Carolyn Leigh
1963 (17th)	Stop the World – I Want to Get Off	Leslie Bricusse & Anthony Newley	
1964 (18th)
1964 (18th)	Hello, Dolly!	Jerry Herman	
1964 (18th)	Funny Girl	Jule Styne	Bob Merrill
1964 (18th)	High Spirits	Timothy Gray & Hugh Martin	
1964 (18th)	110 in the Shade	Harvey Schmidt	Tom Jones
1965 (19th)
1965 (19th)	Fiddler on the Roof	Jerry Bock	Sheldon Harnick
1965 (19th)	Do I Hear a Waltz?	Richard Rodgers	Stephen Sondheim
1965 (19th)	Half a Sixpence	David Heneker	
1965 (19th)	The Roar of the Greasepaint – The Smell of the Crowd	Leslie Bricusse & Anthony Newley	
1966 (20th)
1966 (20th)	Man of La Mancha	Mitch Leigh	Joe Darion
1966 (20th)	Mame	Jerry Herman	
1966 (20th)	On a Clear Day You Can See Forever	Burton Lane	Alan Jay Lerner
1966 (20th)	Sweet Charity	Cy Coleman	Dorothy Fields
1967 (21st)
1967 (21st)	Cabaret	John Kander	Fred Ebb
1967 (21st)	The Apple Tree	Jerry Bock	Sheldon Harnick
1967 (21st)	I Do! I Do!	Harvey Schmidt	Tom Jones
1967 (21st)	Walking Happy	Jimmy Van Heusen	Sammy Cahn
1968 (22nd)
1968 (22nd)	Hallelujah, Baby!	Jule Styne	Betty Comden & Adolph Green
1968 (22nd)	The Happy Time	John Kander	Fred Ebb
1968 (22nd)	How Now, Dow Jones	Elmer Bernstein	Carolyn Leigh
1968 (22nd)	Illya Darling	Manos Hatzidakis	Joe Darion

=== 1970s ===
Year	Production (Musical or Play)	Music	Lyrics
1971 (25th)
1971 (25th)	Company	Stephen Sondheim	
1971 (25th)	The Me Nobody Knows	Gary William Friedman	Will Holt
1971 (25th)	The Rothschilds	Jerry Bock	Sheldon Harnick
1972 (26th)
1972 (26th)	Follies	Stephen Sondheim	
1972 (26th)	Ain't Supposed to Die a Natural Death	Melvin Van Peebles	
1972 (26th)	Jesus Christ Superstar	Andrew Lloyd Webber	Tim Rice
1972 (26th)	Two Gentlemen of Verona	Galt MacDermot	John Guare
1973 (27th)
1973 (27th)	A Little Night Music	Stephen Sondheim	
1973 (27th)	Don't Bother Me, I Can't Cope	Micki Grant	
1973 (27th)	Much Ado About Nothing	Peter Link	—N/a
1973 (27th)	Pippin	Stephen Schwartz	
1974 (28th)
1974 (28th)	Gigi	Frederick Loewe	Alan Jay Lerner
1974 (28th)	The Good Doctor	Peter Link	Neil Simon
1974 (28th)	Raisin	Judd Woldin	Robert Brittan
1974 (28th)	Seesaw	Cy Coleman	Dorothy Fields
1975 (29th)
1975 (29th)	The Wiz	Charlie Smalls	
1975 (29th)	A Letter for Queen Victoria	Alan Lloyd	
1975 (29th)	The Lieutenant	Gene Curty, Nitra Scharfman & Chuck Strand	
1975 (29th)	Shenandoah	Gary Geld	Peter Udell
1976 (30th)
1976 (30th)	A Chorus Line	Marvin Hamlisch	Edward Kleban
1976 (30th)	Chicago	John Kander	Fred Ebb
1976 (30th)	Pacific Overtures	Stephen Sondheim	
1976 (30th)	Treemonisha	Scott Joplin	
1977 (31st)
1977 (31st)	Annie	Charles Strouse	Martin Charnin
1977 (31st)	Godspell	Stephen Schwartz	
1977 (31st)	Happy End	Kurt Weill	Bertolt Brecht & Michael Feingold
1977 (31st)	I Love My Wife	Cy Coleman	Michael Stewart
1978 (32nd)
1978 (32nd)	On the Twentieth Century	Cy Coleman	Betty Comden & Adolph Green
1978 (32nd)	The Act	John Kander	Fred Ebb
1978 (32nd)	Runaways	Elizabeth Swados	
1978 (32nd)	Working	Susan Birkenhead, Craig Carnelia, Micki Grant, Mary Rodgers, Stephen Schwartz & James Taylor	
1979 (33rd)
1979 (33rd)	Sweeney Todd: The Demon Barber of Fleet Street	Stephen Sondheim	
1979 (33rd)	Carmelina	Burton Lane	Alan Jay Lerner
1979 (33rd)	Eubie!	Eubie Blake	Johnny Brandon, Jim Europe, F. E. Miller, Andy Razafe & Noble Sissle
1979 (33rd)	The Grand Tour	Jerry Herman	

=== 1980s ===
Year	Production (Musical or Play)	Music	Lyrics
1980 (34th)
1980 (34th)	Evita	Andrew Lloyd Webber	Tim Rice
1980 (34th)	A Day in Hollywood / A Night in the Ukraine	Frank Lazarus	Dick Vosburgh
1980 (34th)	Barnum	Cy Coleman	Michael Stewart
1980 (34th)	Sugar Babies	Artie Malvin	
1981 (35th)
1981 (35th)	Woman of the Year	John Kander	Fred Ebb
1981 (35th)	Charlie and Algernon	Charles Strouse	David Rogers
1981 (35th)	Copperfield	Joel Hirschhorn & Al Kasha	
1981 (35th)	Shakespeare's Cabaret	Lance Mulcahy	—N/a
1982 (36th)
1982 (36th)	Nine	Maury Yeston	
1982 (36th)	Dreamgirls	Henry Krieger	Tom Eyen
1982 (36th)	Joseph and the Amazing Technicolor Dreamcoat	Andrew Lloyd Webber	Tim Rice
1982 (36th)	Merrily We Roll Along	Stephen Sondheim	
1983 (37th)
1983 (37th)	Cats	Andrew Lloyd Webber	T. S. Eliot
1983 (37th)	A Doll's Life	Larry Grossman	Betty Comden & Adolph Green
1983 (37th)	Merlin	Elmer Bernstein	Don Black
1983 (37th)	Seven Brides for Seven Brothers	Gene de Paul, Joel Hirschhorn & Al Kasha	Hirschhorn, Kasha & Johnny Mercer
1984 (38th)
1984 (38th)	La Cage aux Folles	Jerry Herman	
1984 (38th)	Baby	David Shire	Richard Maltby Jr.
1984 (38th)	The Rink	John Kander	Fred Ebb
1984 (38th)	Sunday in the Park with George	Stephen Sondheim	
1985 (39th)
1985 (39th)	Big River	Roger Miller	
1985 (39th)	Grind	Larry Grossman	Ellen Fitzhugh
1985 (39th)	Quilters	Barbara Damashek	
1986 (40th)
1986 (40th)	The Mystery of Edwin Drood	Rupert Holmes	
1986 (40th)	The News	Paul Schierhorn	
1986 (40th)	Song and Dance	Andrew Lloyd Webber	Don Black & Richard Maltby Jr.
1986 (40th)	Wind in the Willows	William P. Perry	Roger McGough
1987 (41st)
1987 (41st)	Les Misérables	Claude-Michel Schönberg	Herbert Kretzmer & Alain Boublil
1987 (41st)	Me and My Girl	Noel Gay	Douglas Furber & L. Arthur Rose
1987 (41st)	Rags	Charles Strouse	Stephen Schwartz
1987 (41st)	Starlight Express	Andrew Lloyd Webber	Richard Stilgoe
1988 (42nd)
1988 (42nd)	Into the Woods	Stephen Sondheim	
1988 (42nd)	The Phantom of the Opera	Andrew Lloyd Webber	Charles Hart & Richard Stilgoe
1988 (42nd)	Romance/Romance	Keith Herrmann	Barry Harman
1988 (42nd)	Sarafina!	Hugh Masekela & Mbongeni Ngema	

=== 1990s ===
Year	Production (Musical or Play)	Music	Lyrics
1990 (44th)
1990 (44th)	City of Angels	Cy Coleman	David Zippel
1990 (44th)	Aspects of Love	Andrew Lloyd Webber	Don Black & Charles Hart
1990 (44th)	Grand Hotel	Chet Forrest, Bob Wright & Maury Yeston	
1990 (44th)	Meet Me in St. Louis	Ralph Blane & Hugh Martin	
1991 (45th)
1991 (45th)	The Will Rogers Follies	Cy Coleman	Betty Comden & Adolph Green
1991 (45th)	Miss Saigon	Claude-Michel Schönberg	Alain Boublil & Richard Maltby Jr.
1991 (45th)	Once on This Island	Stephen Flaherty	Lynn Ahrens
1991 (45th)	The Secret Garden	Lucy Simon	Marsha Norman
1992 (46th)
1992 (46th)	Falsettos	William Finn	
1992 (46th)	Jelly's Last Jam	Luther Henderson & Jelly Roll Morton	Susan Birkenhead
1992 (46th)	Metro	Janusz Stokłosa	Agata, Maryna Miklaszewska & Mary Bracken Phillips
1992 (46th)	Nick & Nora	Charles Strouse	Richard Maltby Jr.
1993 (47th)
1993 (47th)	Kiss of the Spider Woman (TIE)	John Kander	Fred Ebb
1993 (47th)	The Who's Tommy (TIE)	Pete Townshend	
1993 (47th)	Anna Karenina	Daniel Levine	Peter Kellogg
1993 (47th)	The Song of Jacob Zulu	Ladysmith Black Mambazo	Ladysmith Black Mambazo & Tug Yourgrau
1994 (48th)
1994 (48th)	Passion	Stephen Sondheim	
1994 (48th)	Beauty and the Beast	Alan Menken	Howard Ashman & Tim Rice
1994 (48th)	Cyrano: The Musical	Ad van Dijk	Sheldon Harnick, Peter Reeves & Koen van Dijk
1995 (49th)
1995 (49th)	Sunset Boulevard	Andrew Lloyd Webber	Don Black & Christopher Hampton
1996 (50th)
1996 (50th)	Rent	Jonathan Larson	
1996 (50th)	Big: the musical	David Shire	Richard Maltby Jr.
1996 (50th)	Bring in 'da Noise, Bring in 'da Funk	Ann Duquesnay, Zane Mark & Daryl Waters	Duquesnay, Reg E. Gaines & George C. Wolfe
1996 (50th)	State Fair	Richard Rodgers	Oscar Hammerstein II
1997 (51st)
1997 (51st)	Titanic	Maury Yeston	
1997 (51st)	Juan Darién	Elliot Goldenthal	
1997 (51st)	The Life	Cy Coleman	Ira Gasman
1997 (51st)	Steel Pier	John Kander	Fred Ebb
1998 (52nd)
1998 (52nd)	Ragtime	Stephen Flaherty	Lynn Ahrens
1998 (52nd)	The Capeman	Paul Simon	Simon & Derek Walcott
1998 (52nd)	The Lion King	Elton John, Lebo M, Mark Mancina, Jay Rifkin & Hans Zimmer	Tim Rice, M., Mancina, Rifkin & Julie Taymor
1998 (52nd)	Side Show	Henry Krieger	Bill Russell
1999 (53rd)
1999 (53rd)	Parade	Jason Robert Brown	
1999 (53rd)	The Civil War	Frank Wildhorn	Jack Murphy
1999 (53rd)	Footloose	Eric Carmen, Sammy Hagar, Kenny Loggins, Tom Snow & Jim Steinman	Carmen, Hagar, Loggins, Dean Pitchford & Steinman
1999 (53rd)	Twelfth Night	Jeanine Tesori	—N/a

=== 2000s ===
Year	Production (Musical or Play)	Music	Lyrics
2000 (54th)
2000 (54th)	Aida	Elton John	Tim Rice
2000 (54th)	James Joyce's The Dead	Shaun Davey	Davey & Richard Nelson
2000 (54th)	Marie Christine	Michael John LaChiusa	
2000 (54th)	The Wild Party	Michael John LaChiusa	
2001 (55th)
2001 (55th)	The Producers	Mel Brooks	
2001 (55th)	A Class Act	Edward Kleban	
2001 (55th)	The Full Monty	David Yazbek	
2001 (55th)	Jane Eyre	Paul Gordon	John Caird & Gordon
2002 (56th)
2002 (56th)	Urinetown	Mark Hollmann	Hollmann & Greg Kotis
2002 (56th)	Sweet Smell of Success	Marvin Hamlisch	Craig Carnelia
2002 (56th)	Thoroughly Modern Millie	Jeanine Tesori	Dick Scanlan
2002 (56th)	Thou Shalt Not	Harry Connick Jr.	
2003 (57th)
2003 (57th)	Hairspray	Marc Shaiman	Shaiman & Scott Wittman
2003 (57th)	Amour	Michel Legrand	Jeremy Sams & Didier Van Cauwelaert
2003 (57th)	Urban Cowboy	Danny Arena, Clint Black, Jeff Blumenkrantz, Jason Robert Brown, Roger Brown, Carl L. Byrd, Pevin Byrd-Munoz, Jerry Chesnut, Tommy Conners, Tom Crain, Charlie Daniels, Taz DiGregorio, Ronnie Dunn, Fred Edwards, Skip Ewing, Wayland Holyfield, Bob Lee House, Marcus Hummon, Sara Light, Lauren Lucas, Martie Maguire, Wanda Mallette, Jim Marshall, Bob Morrison, James Hayden Nicholas, Luke Reed, Patti Ryan, Jerry Silverstein & Bob Stillman	
2003 (57th)	A Year with Frog and Toad	Robert Reale	Willie Reale
2004 (58th)
2004 (58th)	Avenue Q	Robert Lopez & Jeff Marx	
2004 (58th)	Caroline, or Change	Jeanine Tesori	Tony Kushner
2004 (58th)	Taboo	Boy George	
2004 (58th)	Wicked	Stephen Schwartz	
2005 (59th)
2005 (59th)	The Light in the Piazza	Adam Guettel	
2005 (59th)	Dirty Rotten Scoundrels	David Yazbek	
2005 (59th)	Spamalot	John Du Prez & Eric Idle	Idle
2005 (59th)	The 25th Annual Putnam County Spelling Bee	William Finn	
2006 (60th)
2006 (60th)	The Drowsy Chaperone	Lisa Lambert & Greg Morrison	
2006 (60th)	The Color Purple	Stephen Bray, Brenda Russell & Allee Willis	
2006 (60th)	The Wedding Singer	Matthew Sklar	Chad Beguelin
2006 (60th)	The Woman in White	Andrew Lloyd Webber	David Zippel
2007 (61st)
2007 (61st)	Spring Awakening	Duncan Sheik	Steven Sater
2007 (61st)	Curtains	John Kander	Fred Ebb, Kander & Rupert Holmes
2007 (61st)	Grey Gardens	Scott Frankel	Michael Korie
2007 (61st)	Legally Blonde The Musical	Nell Benjamin & Larry O'Keefe	
2008 (62nd)
2008 (62nd)	In the Heights	Lin-Manuel Miranda	
2008 (62nd)	Cry-Baby	David Javerbaum & Adam Schlesinger	
2008 (62nd)	The Little Mermaid	Alan Menken	Howard Ashman & Glenn Slater
2008 (62nd)	Passing Strange	Stew & Heidi Rodewald	Stew
2009 (63rd)
2009 (63rd)	Next to Normal	Tom Kitt	Brian Yorkey
2009 (63rd)	Billy Elliot the Musical	Elton John	Lee Hall
2009 (63rd)	Shrek the Musical	Jeanine Tesori	David Lindsay-Abaire
2009 (63rd)	9 to 5	Dolly Parton	

=== 2010s ===
Year	Production (Musical or Play)	Music	Lyrics
2010 (64th)
2010 (64th)	Memphis	David Bryan	Bryan & Joe DiPietro
2010 (64th)	The Addams Family	Andrew Lippa	
2010 (64th)	Enron	Adam Cork	Lucy Prebble
2010 (64th)	Fences	Branford Marsalis	—N/a
2011 (65th)
2011 (65th)	The Book of Mormon	Robert Lopez, Trey Parker & Matt Stone	
2011 (65th)	The Scottsboro Boys	John Kander	Fred Ebb
2011 (65th)	Sister Act	Alan Menken	Glenn Slater
2011 (65th)	Women on the Verge of a Nervous Breakdown	David Yazbek	
2012 (66th)
2012 (66th)	Newsies	Alan Menken	Jack Feldman
2012 (66th)	Bonnie & Clyde	Frank Wildhorn	Don Black
2012 (66th)	One Man, Two Guvnors	Grant Olding	
2012 (66th)	Peter and the Starcatcher	Wayne Barker	Rick Elice
2013 (67th)
2013 (67th)	Kinky Boots	Cyndi Lauper	
2013 (67th)	A Christmas Story: The Musical	Benj Pasek & Justin Paul	
2013 (67th)	Hands on a Hardbody	Trey Anastasio & Amanda Green	Green
2013 (67th)	Matilda the Musical	Tim Minchin	
2014 (68th)
2014 (68th)	The Bridges of Madison County	Jason Robert Brown	
2014 (68th)	Aladdin	Alan Menken	Howard Ashman, Tim Rice & Chad Beguelin
2014 (68th)	A Gentleman's Guide to Love and Murder	Steven Lutvak	Robert L. Freedman & Lutvak
2014 (68th)	If/Then	Tom Kitt	Brian Yorkey
2015 (69th)
2015 (69th)	Fun Home	Jeanine Tesori	Lisa Kron
2015 (69th)	The Last Ship	Sting	
2015 (69th)	Something Rotten!	Karey & Wayne Kirkpatrick	
2015 (69th)	The Visit	John Kander	Fred Ebb
2016 (70th)
2016 (70th)	Hamilton	Lin-Manuel Miranda	
2016 (70th)	Bright Star	Edie Brickell	Brickell & Steve Martin
2016 (70th)	School of Rock	Andrew Lloyd Webber	Glenn Slater
2016 (70th)	Waitress	Sara Bareilles	
2017 (71st)
2017 (71st)	Dear Evan Hansen	Benj Pasek & Justin Paul	
2017 (71st)	Come from Away	David Hein & Irene Sankoff	
2017 (71st)	Groundhog Day	Tim Minchin	
2017 (71st)	Natasha, Pierre & The Great Comet of 1812	Dave Malloy	
2018 (72nd)
2018 (72nd)	The Band's Visit	David Yazbek	
2018 (72nd)	Angels in America	Adrian Sutton	—N/a
2018 (72nd)	Frozen	Robert Lopez & Kristen Anderson-Lopez	
2018 (72nd)	Mean Girls	Jeff Richmond	Nell Benjamin
2018 (72nd)	SpongeBob SquarePants	Yolanda Adams, Sara Bareilles, Jonathan Coulton, Domani, Alex Ebert, The Flaming Lips, Rob Hyman, Lady Antebellum, Cyndi Lauper, John Legend, Lil'C, Panic! at the Disco, Plain White T's, Joe Perry, They Might Be Giants, T.I. & Steven Tyler	
2019 (73rd)
2019 (73rd)	Hadestown	Anaïs Mitchell	
2019 (73rd)	Be More Chill	Joe Iconis	
2019 (73rd)	Beetlejuice	Eddie Perfect	
2019 (73rd)	The Prom	Matthew Sklar	Chad Beguelin
2019 (73rd)	To Kill a Mockingbird	Adam Guettel	—N/a
2019 (73rd)	Tootsie	David Yazbek	

=== 2020s ===
Year	Production (Musical or Play)	Music	Lyrics
2020 (74th)
2020 (74th)	A Christmas Carol	Christopher Nightingale	—N/a
2020 (74th)	The Inheritance	Paul Englishby	—N/a
2020 (74th)	The Rose Tattoo	Fitz Patton & Jason Michael Webb	—N/a
2020 (74th)	Slave Play	Lindsay Jones	—N/a
2020 (74th)	The Sound Inside	Daniel Kluger	—N/a
2022 (75th)
2022 (75th)	SIX: The Musical	Toby Marlow & Lucy Moss	
2022 (75th)	Flying Over Sunset	Tom Kitt	Michael Korie
2022 (75th)	Mr. Saturday Night	Jason Robert Brown	Amanda Green
2022 (75th)	Paradise Square	Jason Howland	Masi Asare & Nathan Tysen
2022 (75th)	A Strange Loop	Michael R. Jackson	
2023 (76th)
2023 (76th)	Kimberly Akimbo	Jeanine Tesori	David Lindsay-Abaire
2023 (76th)	Almost Famous	Tom Kitt	Cameron Crowe & Kitt
2023 (76th)	KPOP	Helen Park & Max Vernon	
2023 (76th)	Shucked	Brandy Clark & Shane McAnally	
2023 (76th)	Some Like It Hot	Marc Shaiman	Shaiman & Scott Wittman
2024 (77th)
2024 (77th)	Suffs	Shaina Taub	
2024 (77th)	Days of Wine and Roses	Adam Guettel	
2024 (77th)	Here Lies Love	David Byrne & Fatboy Slim	Byrne
2024 (77th)	The Outsiders	Jamestown Revival & Justin Levine	
2024 (77th)	Stereophonic	Will Butler	
2025 (78th)
2025 (78th)	Maybe Happy Ending	Will Aronson	Aronson & Hue Park
2025 (78th)	Dead Outlaw	Erik Della Penna & David Yazbek	
2025 (78th)	Death Becomes Her	Noel Carey & Julia Mattison	
2025 (78th)	Operation Mincemeat: A New Musical	David Cumming, Felix Hagan, Natasha Hodgson & Zoë Roberts	
2025 (78th)	Real Women Have Curves: The Musical	Joy Huerta & Benjamin Velez	
2026 (79th)
2026 (79th)	Schmigadoon!	Cinco Paul	
2026 (79th)	Death of a Salesman	Caroline Shaw	—N/a
2026 (79th)	Joe Turner's Come and Gone	Steve Bargonetti	—N/a
2026 (79th)	The Lost Boys	The Rescues	
2026 (79th)	Two Strangers (Carry a Cake Across New York)	Jim Barne & Kit Buchan	

== Multiple wins ==
7 Wins (1 For Best Lyrics at the 1971 Tonys)

- Stephen Sondheim (3 consecutive)

3 Wins

- Cy Coleman (2 consecutive)
- Betty Comden
- Fred Ebb
- Adolph Green
- John Kander
- Andrew Lloyd Webber

2 Wins

- Jason Robert Brown
- Jerry Herman
- Robert Lopez
- Lin-Manuel Miranda
- Tim Rice
- Richard Rodgers
- Jeanine Tesori
- Maury Yeston

== Multiple nominations ==
11 Nominations

- Fred Ebb
- John Kander
- Andrew Lloyd Webber

10 Nominations

- Stephen Sondheim

9 Nominations

- Cy Coleman

7 Nominations

- Tim Rice

6 Nominations

- Jeanine Tesori
- David Yazbek

5 Nominations

- Don Black
- Jerry Herman
- Richard Maltby Jr.
- Alan Menken
- Stephen Schwartz

4 Nominations

- Jason Robert Brown
- Betty Comden
- Adolph Green
- Sheldon Harnick
- Tom Kitt
- Richard Rodgers
- Charles Strouse

3 Nominations

- Howard Ashman
- Chad Beguelin
- Jerry Bock
- Adam Guettel
- Elton John
- Alan Jay Lerner
- Robert Lopez
- Glenn Slater
- Maury Yeston

2 Nominations

- Lynn Ahrens
- Sara Bareilles
- Nell Benjamin
- Elmer Bernstein
- Susan Birkenhead
- Alain Boublil
- Leslie Bricusse
- Craig Carnelia
- Joe Darion
- Dorothy Fields
- William Finn
- Stephen Flaherty
- Micki Grant
- Amanda Green
- Larry Grossman
- Marvin Hamlisch
- Charles Hart
- Joel Hirschhorn
- Rupert Holmes
- Tom Jones
- Al Kasha
- Edward Kleban
- Michael Korie
- Henry Krieger
- Michael John LaChiusa
- Burton Lane
- Cyndi Lauper
- Carolyn Leigh
- David Lindsay-Abaire
- Peter Link
- Hugh Martin
- Tim Minchin
- Lin-Manuel Miranda
- Anthony Newley
- Benj Pasek
- Justin Paul
- Harvey Schmidt
- Claude-Michel Schönberg
- Marc Shaiman
- David Shire
- Matthew Sklar
- Michael Stewart
- Richard Stilgoe
- Jule Styne
- Kurt Weill
- Frank Wildhorn
- Scott Wittman
- Brian Yorkey
- David Zippel

== Female winners ==
Only nine women have won this award, six of whom won without male writing partners, and for eleven shows:

- Betty Comden – Hallelujah, Baby! (1968), On the Twentieth Century (1978), and The Will Rogers Follies (1991), becoming the first woman to win this Tony multiple times.
- Lynn Ahrens – Ragtime (1998)
- Lisa Lambert – The Drowsy Chaperone (2006)
- Cyndi Lauper – Kinky Boots (2013), becoming the first woman to win this Tony without a writing partner
- Jeanine Tesori – Fun Home (2015) and Kimberly Akimbo (2023)
- Lisa Kron – Fun Home (2015), Kron and Jeanine Tesori becoming the first all-female songwriting team (music and lyrics) to win this Tony.
- Anaïs Mitchell – Hadestown (2019)
- Lucy Moss – SIX: The Musical (2022)
- Shaina Taub - Suffs (2024)

== See also ==
- Tony Award for Best Book of a Musical
- Drama Desk Award for Outstanding Music
- Drama Desk Award for Outstanding Music in a Play
- Laurence Olivier Award for Best Original Score or New Orchestrations
- List of Tony Award-nominated productions
