= No Way Out =

No Way Out may refer to:

== Film and television ==
- No Way Out (1950 film), a film starring Richard Widmark and Sidney Poitier
- No Way Out (1973 film), a film starring Alain Delon and Richard Conte
- No Way Out (1987 film), a film starring Kevin Costner and Gene Hackman
- No Way Out, a film starring Héctor Echavarría, Estella Warren, and Danny Trejo
- No Way Out, a film starring Keiran Lee
- "No Way Out" (Porridge), a 1975 television episode
- "No Way Out" (The Walking Dead), a 2016 television episode
- "No Way Out", a 2009 television episode from CSI: Crime Scene Investigation season 9
- "No Way Out", a 2014 television episode see list of Highway Thru Hell episodes

== Literature ==
- No Way Out (novel), a novel by Nikolai Leskov
- No Exit or No Way Out, a play by Jean-Paul Sartre
- No Way Out, a Hardy Boys novel
- No Way Out, a The Bluford Series book by Peggy Kern

== Music ==
- My American Heart or No Way Out
- No Way Out (The Chocolate Watchband album) (1967)
- No Way Out (Puff Daddy album) (1997)

=== Songs ===
- "No Way Out" (Phil Collins song), a song from the Brother Bear soundtrack
- "No Way Out" (Bullet for My Valentine song)
- "No Way Out" (DJ Trevi song)
- "No Way Out", a song by Annihilator from Feast
- "No Way Out", a song by the Bloods & Crips from Bangin' on Wax
- "No Way Out", a song by Bone Thugs-n-Harmony from BTNHResurrection
- "No Way Out", a song by Dope from American Apathy
- "No Way Out", a song by Electric Light Orchestra from Afterglow
- "No Way Out", a song by Jefferson Starship from Nuclear Furniture
- "No Way Out", a song by Loudness from Thunder in the East
- "No Way Out", a song by Missing Persons from Spring Session M
- "No Way Out", a song by Pete Townshend that reworked the Who's "However Much I Booze"
- "No Way Out", a song by Peter Gabriel from Up
- "No Way Out", a song by Screaming Jets from Scam
- "No Way Out", a song by Stone Temple Pilots from No. 4
- "No Way Out", a song by Theory of a Deadman from Gasoline
- "No Way Out", a song by The Word Alive from Monomania

== Other uses ==
- WWE No Way Out, a professional wrestling pay-per-view event series

== See also ==
- No Way Out 2, a 2017 album by Puff Daddy
