= DJ Trevi =

- Also known as: DJ Trevi, Martin Treavor
- Born: Treavor Alvarado; June 27, 1990 (age 36)
- Origin: Guadalajara, Jalisco, México
- Genres: Electronica, trance, electro house
- Occupations: Producer, musician
- Years active: 2005–present
- Labels: CS Recordings, Play This! Records, HOT-Q, LW Recordings, Re:vibe Music
- Website: ilovetoraveepic.com
- Military Service
- Allegiance: United States
- Branch: United States Army
- Rank: Staff Sergeant
- Units: Headquarters Company 3-58 AVN BN, C/Co 3-58 AVN, B/Co 3-58th AVN, 12th Aviation Brigade

Treavor Alvarado (born June 27, 1990), better known by his stage name DJ Trevi and under other pseudonyms such as Martin Treavor, is a Mexican-American DJ and ex reality show personality, and actor. Alvarado's main focus has been music production, composing for other artists, and writing content for I Love To Rave Epic. Alvarado appeared in the independent film Left at the Rio Grande and 12 Corazones, the second season of Telemundo's long-running reality television series. He made his Spanish prime-time TV debut on the third season of Cuatro's reality series First Dates.

His first single, "Love", scored him his first top ten. It peaked at number 9 on MTV Jango Radio Airplay.

In 2012 his debut album EP, Apocalypse 2012, was released on CS Recordings.

In 2014"No Way Out" was released on MTV Artist and was nominated for Best Dance/Electronic Single of the Year at the 23rd Annual L.A. Music Awards.

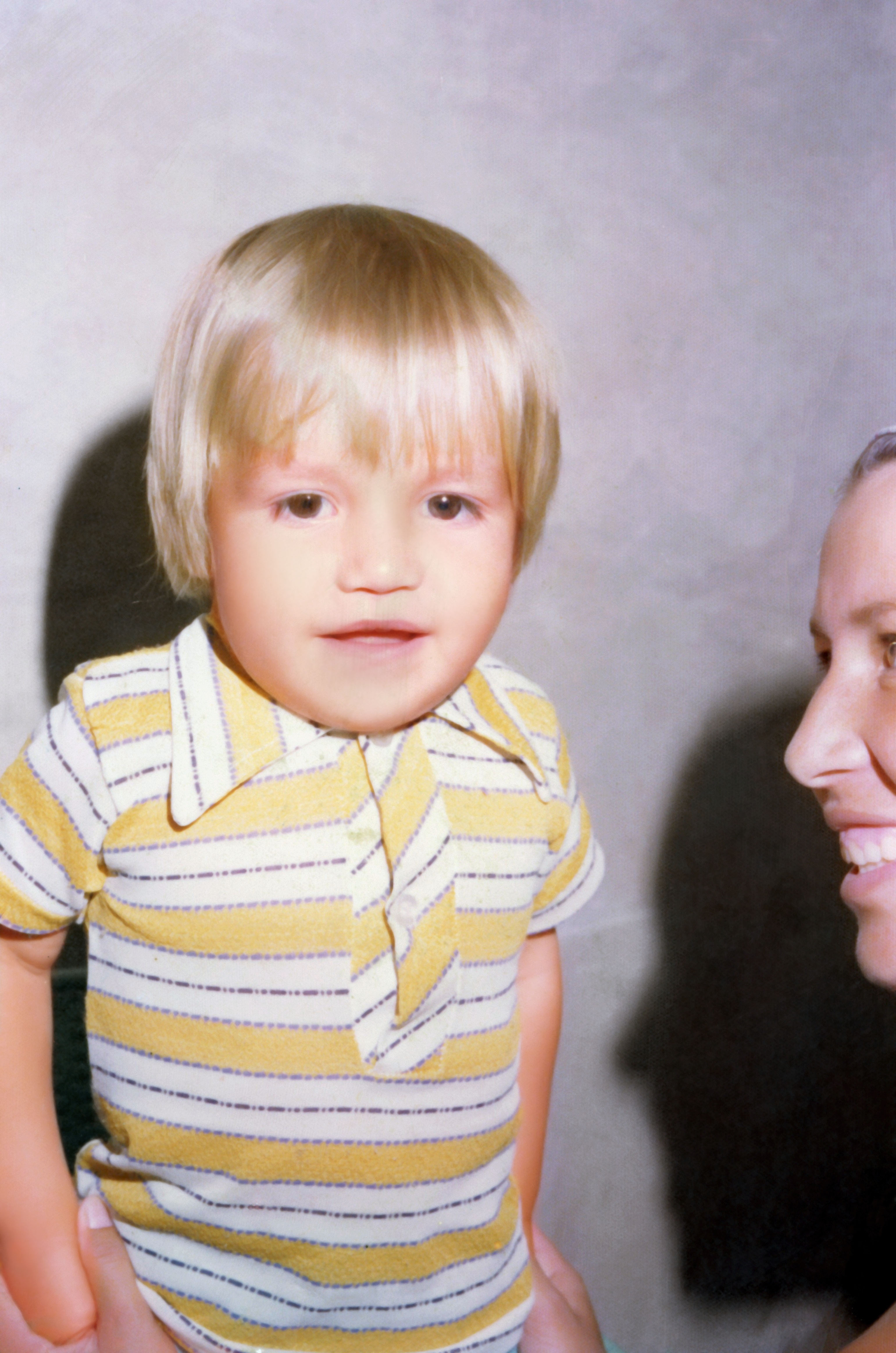
Alvarado at 3 years old

== Career ==
=== Television and film ===
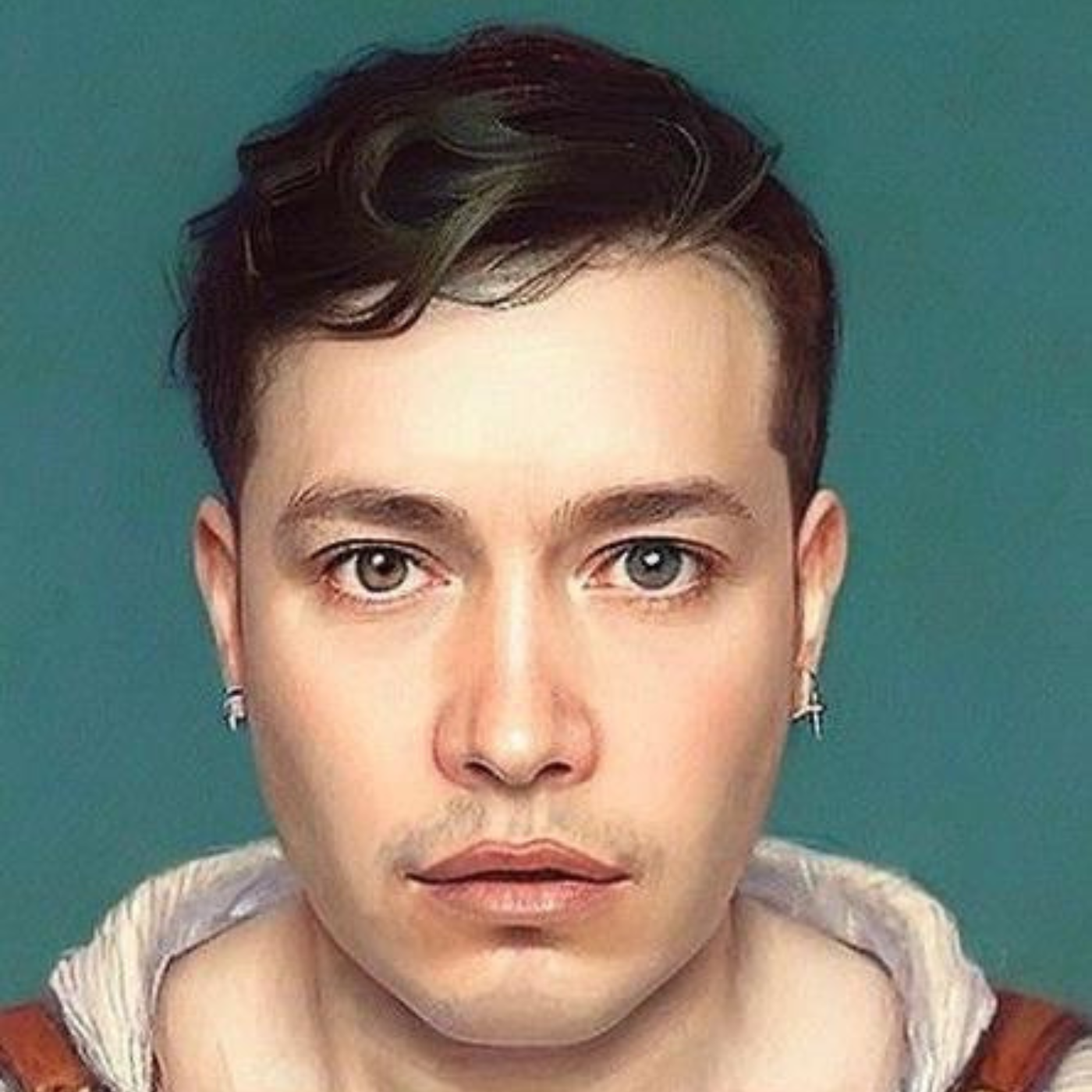
Alvarado

Before becoming an international DJ and producer, Alvarado was an intern at American Broadcasting Company, working on the Emmy-winning magazine show Vista LA.

His TV appearances include 12 Corazones.

In 2005 Karla Shelton cast Alvarado in the independent film Left at the Rio Grande, directed by Kevin Abrams (film director).

In 2007 Alvarado worked on the TLC reality series Kids By The Dozen.

=== CS Recordings label and Apocalypse 2012 ===
On October 10, 2011, his first hit single, "Love", went on rotation with artists like Deadmau5, Tiesto, Daft Punk, and Swedish House Mafia, peaking at number 9 on MTV-owned Jango Radio Air Play.

In 2012, Alvarado began his record label, CS Recordings, which, along with LW Recordings, released the 2012 album, Apocalypse 2012. It featured the songs "Apocalypse 2012", "Get Down," "Superhero," and the hard dance track Schizophrenia."

"Love" and "Apocalypse 2012" were featured in the documentary Gay Latino Los Angeles: Coming Of Age. "Schizophrenia" was featured on the mega-series Amsterdam Dance Essentials: Hard Dance and became one of the most downloaded songs on iTunes.

On August 14, 2012, "No Way Out" was released and was nominated for Best Dance/Electronic Single of the Year at the 23rd Annual L.A. Music Awards.

In 2013, Alvarado teamed up with Mike Avery and Tiffany Jackson and released the single "Movin'", his first single to reach the top 20 on Track It Down's Hard Dance Charts. The follow-up, a Billy Seal remix of "Apocalypse", also reached the top 10 on Track It Down's Electro House Charts.

=== Spanish TV, film and Dancing Nowhere ===
In 2021 Alvarado played a DJ in the film Party Beast. He made his Spanish prime-time TV debut on the third season of Cuatro's reality series First Dates.

With high ratings and a trending base on social media, Alvarado made headlines.

He announced that he would release new techno music under the name Martin Treavor.

Alvarado produced the track "Tu Ca Nun Chiagne" for Tunisian singer Haythme Hadhiri, which received attention on Tunisian and Moroccan TV and radio

== Television ==
- Jugar a Ganar, Telemundo, 2005 – Cake Boy
- 12 Corazones, Telemundo, 2005 – Cancer
- Kids By The Dozen, TLC, 2007 – Trevor
- First Dates, Cuatro, 2018 – Himself

== Film ==
- Left at the Rio Grande, AFI; 2005 – Manny
- Cobarde, Young Talents Film, 2017 – Cinematographer
- Chantaje, Young Talents Film, 2017 – Cinematographer
- Party Beasts, Maat mons Films, 2021 – DJ (short film)

== Discography ==
- "Love" (single) (CS Recordings; 2011)
- "Apocalypse 2012" (EP) (CS Recordings; 2012)
- "No Way Out" (single) (CS Recordings; 2013)
- "Movin" with Mike Avery (single) (CS Recordings; 2013)
- "Apocalypse (The Second Coming)" (single) (CS Recordings; 2013)
- "Shallow" with Mike Avery (single) (CS Recordings; 2014)
- "Tu Ca Nun Chiagne" by Haythme Hadhiri, produced by DJ Trevi (single) (CS Recordings; 2017)
- "7 (God's Child)" (single) (CS Recordings; 2018)
- "Oh Father" (single) (CS Recordings; 2019)
- "Out Of Me" (single) by Dimitris Nezis, produced and written by Treavor Alvarado and Dimitris Nezis (2020)
- "Get Down" (single) (CS Recordings; 2021)
- "Storybook" (EP) (CS Recordings; 2026) as Treavor Alvarado

== Awards ==
=== LA Music Awards ===
In November 2013, DJ Trevi was nominated for best dance single of the year.

Year	Nominee / work	Award	Result
2013	"No Way Out"	Best Dance/Electronic Single of Year	Nominated
