= Storm in a Teacup =

Storm in a Teacup may refer to:

== Film and television ==
- Storm in a Teacup (film), a 1937 British film
- A Storm in a Teacup, a 2000 film directed by Ding Sheng
- "A Storm in a Teacup" (Porridge), a 1977 television episode

== Literature ==
- "A Storm in a Teacup" (short story), a 1920 story by Lu Xun
- Storm in a Teacup: The Physics of Everyday Life, a 2016 book by Helen Czerski
- Storm in a Teacup, a 1936 play adaptation by James Bridie based on Bruno Frank's 'Sturm im Wasserglas'

== Music ==
- "Storm in a Teacup" (The Fortunes song), 1971
- "Storm in a Teacup", a song by Badfinger from Magic Christian Music, 2010 reissue
- "Storm in a Teacup", a song by Erasure from Light at the End of the World, 2007
- "Storm in a Teacup", a song by Milburn from Well Well Well, 2006
- "Storm in a Teacup", a song by the Red Hot Chili Peppers from Stadium Arcadium, 2006

== Other uses ==
- Storm in a teacup (idiom), or tempest in a teapot, an idiom meaning a small event that has been exaggerated
- Storm in a Teacup (company), an Italian video game developer

== See also ==
- Teacup in a Storm, a Hong Kong radio talk program
