= Love (DJ Trevi song) =

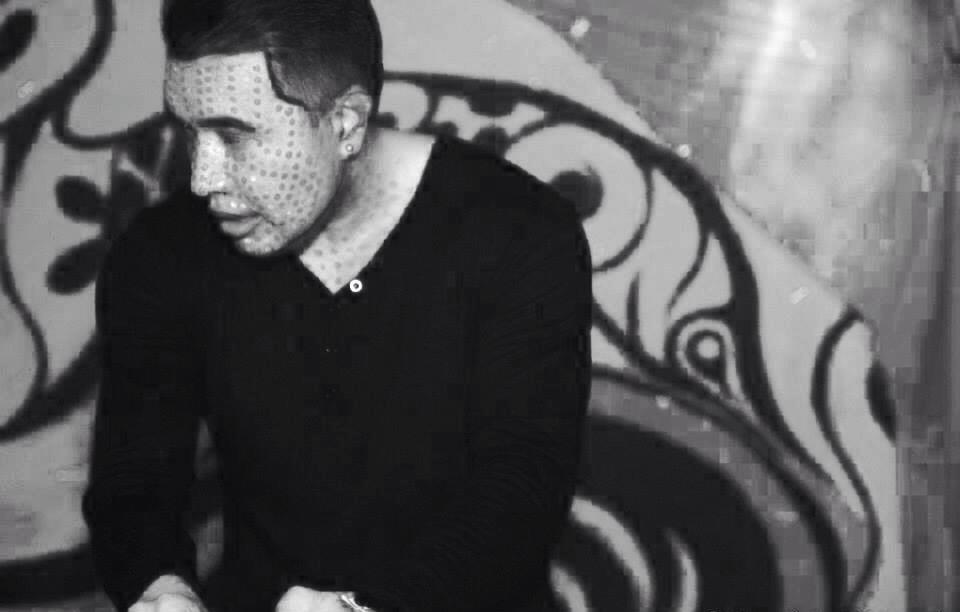

Single by DJ Trevi
- Released: 14 July 2011
- Genre: Electro house
- Length: 7:59 (original version); 4:23 (album version and radio edit)
- Label: CS Recordings
- Songwriter(s): Treavor Alvarado
- Producer(s): Treavor Alvarado

DJ Trevi singles chronology
"Love" (2011)	"No Way Out" (2012)

"Love" is a song by American progressive house and electro house artist DJ Trevi. It was featured in the documentary Gay Latino Los Angeles: Coming of Age. A radio and extended version were re-released on December 8, 2012.

== History ==
The song was originally made for personal use as a healing process for DJ Trevi. He had recently come out of an emotional relationship with someone who was HIV positive. He wanted to convey a message that love is love no matter what status, color of your skin, sexual orientation, or religion. The video had a powerful message, that it is possible to love someone that is positive, even though he is negative.

The video went viral and people wanted a copy of the song that accompanied the video. DJ Trevi agreed to release the song and donate the profits to an HIV awareness program. The song had an impact in the gay community, with people expressing either hate or love for the message.

Although the song was released and had moderate success, the former reality TV star has never played the song in his sets.

== Reception ==
The song peaked at number 9 in the international radio charts on Jango in the week ending 4 October 2011.

In the United States, "Love" received exposure from its use in the documentary Gay Latino L.A., which was shown at universities and festivals. It premiered in Mexico, adding international exposure for the film and its soundtrack, which features two of DJ Trevi's tracks. A radio and extended version were re-released on Dec 8th, 2012.

== Track listing ==
1. “Love” (Radio Edit) – 4:23
2. “Love” (Original Mix) – 7:59

== Chart performance ==
Chart (2011)	Peak position
International (Jango)	9
