= Veda bread =

Irish brand of malt loaf

- Type: Bread
- Place of origin: United Kingdom, Ireland
- Region or state: Scotland, Northern Ireland
- Serving temperature: Sliced
- Main ingredients: Wheat flour

Veda bread is a brand of malt loaf traditionally produced across the United Kingdom and Ireland. However, today it is mainly produced in Northern Ireland. It is a small, caramel-colored malted bread with a soft consistency when fresh, being sold under the brands Ormo, Sunblest and Irwin’s.

== History ==
The formula for Veda was allegedly stumbled upon by luck when a Dundee farmer's house-keeper accidentally used damp wheat which had sprouted to produce malted wheat (which is just one of many ways bread using wheat flour can be made and a common way wheat could be used, just not commonly for bread). This produced a sweet-malted flavored bread.

Although a sweet bread, Veda is often toasted with butter and cheese, although many prefer to add jam or marmalade. It is usually eaten as a snack.

Veda Bakeries holds the original recipe for Veda bread, and they have not published it publicly. The company is based in East Lothian in Haddington. The majority shares (75%) are owned by Miss Laura Frances Wilson.

In Northern England, Veda bread is a sweet, sticky loaf made with black treacle. It is usually eaten sliced or dry, with butter or margarine. The molasses in the treacle help to preserve the mixture, and Veda-bread connoisseurs will leave a freshly baked loaf for several weeks in a closed cake tin to allow the flavors to mature before they eat it.

== See also ==
- List of breads
