= CS recordings =

American record label

CS Recordings
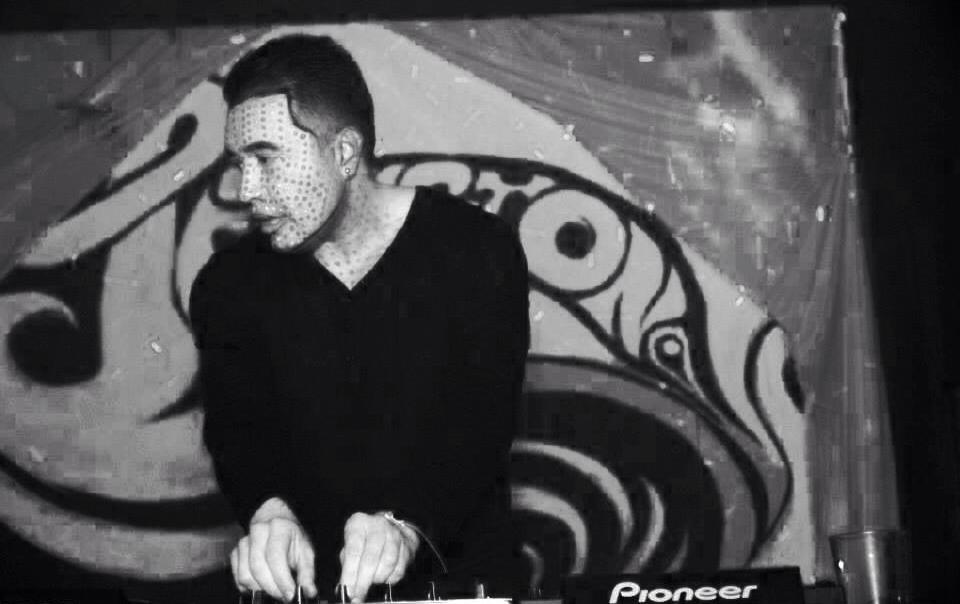
- Founded: 2011
- Founder: DJ Trevi
- Distributor: Label Worx
- Genre: Electro house, progressive house, trance, techno, house
- Country of origin: United States
- Location: Los Angeles, CA
- Official website: ilovetoraveepic.com

CS Recordings is an American record label founded in 2011 by electronic music producer DJ Trevi. CS Recordings is an independent label with music-rights and publishing at BMI.

== Signed artists ==
=== Current ===
- DJ Trevi (founder)
- Mike Avery

=== Former ===
- Alegroe
- Delshed
- Kash
- Haythem Hadhiri
- Dani DiMaggio
- Hate Beat Crushers
- Shmitty
- Tyler Rouse
- Wardogg
- Tiffany Jackson
- J.A. Maldonado

== Releases ==
Albums, EPs, and singles from DJ Trevi's discography are included.

=== Standard releases ===
Year	Artist	Release	Type	Release date	Catalogue
2012	DJ Trevi	Apocalypse 2012	EP	June 28, 2012	CSA0001
2012	DJ Trevi	"No Way Out"	Single	August 14, 2012	CS0002
2012	DJ Trevi	"Love "	Single	September 12, 2012	CS0003
2013	Mike Avery & DJ Trevi	"Movin'"	Single	March 14, 2013	CS1005
2013	DJ Trevi	"Apocalypse (The Second Coming) - The Club Baby 2013 Rebirth"	Single	May 30, 2013	CS1006
2014	Alegroe	Alegroe	EP	April 29, 2014	CSA0002
2014	Mike Avery & DJ Trevi	"Shallow"	Single	May 30, 2013	CS1006
2014	Delsahd	"That Funky Rhythm"	Single	December 2, 2014	CS1009
2015	Tyler Rouse & Shmitty	"Calves & Warps"	Single	May 5, 2015	CS1004
2015	Delsahd	"The Future "	Single	May 22, 2015	CS1010
2015	Hate Beat Crushers	"Groovin "	Single	October 20, 2015	CS1012
2016	Hate Beat Crushers	"Deeper"	Single	February 8, 2016	CS1011
2016	DJ Kash	"Drop Zone"	Single	October 11, 2016	CS1013
2017	DJ Kash	"Everybody Get Down"	Single	April 4, 2017	CS1017
2017	DJ Kash Feat. David Hernandez	"More Than Maybe"	Single	May 16, 2017	CS1018
2017	DJ Kash	"Rave To The Grave"	Single	July 14, 2017	CS1017
2017	Haythem Hadhiri	"Tu Ca Nun Chiagne"	Single	November 24, 2017	CS1024
2018	DJ Trevi	"7 (God's Child)"	Single	June 11, 2018	CS1025
2019	DJ Trevi	" Oh Father (Enekos Song)"	Single	March 29, 2019	CS1007
2019	Dani DiMaggio	"My Dream"	Single	March 29, 2019	CA1004
2020	J.A. Maldonado	"Back In The Mix"	Single	August 8, 2020	CS1027
2021	DJ Trevi	"Open 24/7"	Album	May 7, 2021	CA1005
