= Southie Rules =

American reality television series

- Genre: Reality
- Created by: Ryan o'Dowd
- Composer: Tim Wynn
- Country of origin: United States
- No. of seasons: 1
- No. of episodes: 11

Production
- Executive producers: Brian Flanagan; David McKillop; Drew Tappon; Elaine Frontain Bryant; Fred Grinstein; Joel Olicker; Laura Palumbo; Matt Ostrom; Seanbaker Carter; Tug Yourgrau
- Running time: 20 to 23 minutes
- Production companies: Magilla Entertainment; Powderhouse Productions

Original release
- Network: A&E
- Release: January 29 – March 2, 2013

Southie Rules is an American reality television series on A&E. The series premiered on January 29, 2013, and chronicles the day-to-day life of the Niedzwiecki family, a multi-generational family located in South Boston that lives all under one roof in a three-level home. A&E moved the series to Saturday after episode four ratings fell to a series low of 606,000 viewers, which is half of its debut audience. Two episodes aired on February 23, 2013 while the remaining episodes were burned off on March 2, 2013 in a mid-afternoon marathon.

== Episodes ==
No.	Title	Original release date	Prod. code	U.S. viewers (millions)
1	"Bill Roulette"	January 29, 2013	106	1.28
2	"Poseidon: King of South Boston"	January 29, 2013	102	0.82
3	"Devin's Adventures in Babysitting"	February 5, 2013	105	0.92
4	"She's Having A Friggin' Baby?!?!"	February 5, 2013	104	0.60
5	"We Need a Bigger Boat"	February 23, 2013	107	N/A
6	"The Initiation"	February 23, 2013	103	N/A
7	"The Passion of the Couch"	March 2, 2013	109	N/A
8	"Who's the Boss?"	March 2, 2013	101	N/A
9	"Lights, Camera, Laundry!"	March 2, 2013	108	N/A
10	"Dress to Impress"	March 2, 2013	110	N/A
11	"Recipe for Disaster"	March 2, 2013	111	N/A
