= Airline Highway (play) =

- Original language: English
- Written by: Lisa D'Amour
- Characters: Miss Ruby; Sissy Na Na; Bait Boy; Zoe; Tanya; Wayne; Krista; Terry; Francis; Ensemble
- Genre: Black comedy
- Setting: The Hummingbird Motel, Off Airline Highway, New Orleans, Louisiana

Premiere
- Date: December 4, 2014
- Place: Steppenwolf Theatre; Chicago, Illinois

Airline Highway is an American play, written by Lisa D'Amour and set in New Orleans. Commissioned by the Steppenwolf Theatre Company, the play made its Broadway debut in April 2015 at Manhattan Theatre Club's Samuel J Friedman Theatre. It received four Tony Award nominations, including Best Featured Actor in a Play for K. Todd Freeman and Best Featured Actress in a Play for Julie White. Additionally, it received three Drama Desk Award nominations, winning one for Freeman. Its final performance was on June 7, 2015.

== Synopsis ==
Airline Highway takes place in the parking lot of The Hummingbird Motel, off the titular highway near New Orleans, where the residents have gathered to celebrate the life of Miss Ruby, an iconic burlesque queen who has been a mother figure to them all. Miss Ruby's life is nearing its end, and she requests that her funeral takes place while she is still alive. As the Mardi Gras-esque celebration continues into the night, the stories of the residents, their pain and disappointments unfold.

== Productions ==
=== Original Steppenwolf Production ===
The original production of the play was performed in Chicago, Illinois, by the Steppenwolf Theatre Company from December 4, 2014, until February 14, 2015. The production was directed by Joe Mantello with set design by Scott Pask. K. Todd Freeman performed the role of Sissy Na Na, with Kate Buddeke as Tanya, Scott Jaeck as Wayne, Tim Edward Rhoze as Terry, Caroline Neff as Krista, Gordon Joseph Weiss as Francis, Stephen Louis Grush as Bait Boy, Carolyn Braver as Zoe, and Judith Roberts as Miss Ruby. The ensemble was Robert Breuler, Chris Daley, Terry Hamilton, Toni Martin, Brenann Stacker, and Jacqueline Williams.

=== Broadway Production ===
The play was produced on Broadway by the Manhattan Theatre Club at the Samuel J. Friedman Theatre from April 23 through June 7, 2015. The play was again directed by Joe Mantello. The majority of the cast reprised their roles, including K. Todd Freeman performed the role of Sissy Na Na, Scott Jaeck as Wayne, Tim Edward Rhoze as Terry, Caroline Neff as Krista, Carolyn Braver as Zoe, and Judith Roberts as Miss Ruby. New additions to the Broadway cast were Julie White as Tanya, Ken Marks as Francis, and Joe Tippett as Bait Boy. The ensemble was Todd D'amour, Shannon Eagen, Venida Evans, Joe Forbrich, Leslie Hendrix, Sekou Laidlow, and Toni Martin.

== Awards and nominations ==
Year	Award	Category	Nominee	Result
2015	Tony Award	Best Featured Actor in a Play	K. Todd Freeman	Nominated
2015	Tony Award	Best Featured Actress in a Play	Julie White	Nominated
2015	Tony Award	Best Costume Design of a Play	David Zinn	Nominated
2015	Tony Award	Best Lighting Design of a Play	Japhy Weideman	Nominated
2015	Drama Desk Award	Outstanding Play		Nominated
2015	Drama Desk Award	Outstanding Featured Actor in a Play	K. Todd Freeman	Won
2015	Drama Desk Award	Outstanding Featured Actress in a Play	Julie White	Nominated
2015	Drama League Award	Distinguished Performance	Julie White	Nominated
