= The Harder They Fall (Porridge) =

- Porridge episode
- Episode no.: Season 2 Episode 6
- Directed by: Sydney Lotterby
- Written by: Dick Clement; Ian La Frenais
- Original air date: 28 November 1975

Episode chronology
← Previous "Happy Release"	Next → "No Way Out"

"The Harder They Fall" is an episode of the British sitcom Porridge, made for the BBC. It first aired on 28 November 1975, and is the sixth episode of the second series. In this episode, Fletcher finds himself in trouble when two rival prisoners decide to fix a boxing match, leaving him at risk of the wrath of one of them for helping the other.

== Synopsis ==
Godber takes up boxing, much to Fletcher's displeasure, though prison officer Mackay approves of it, having boxed for his army unit in the past. While Godber is out getting training, Fletcher is summoned to meet with Harry Grout, who lives a more lavish lifestyle due to his criminal reputation. Grout reveals to Fletcher that he intends to fix an upcoming match that Godber is set to take part in and coerces Fletcher to have his cellmate take a dive in the second round or face consequences for not allowing this.

That night, Fletcher shows a rarely seen kind side to Godber, explaining the situation he is in. When he asks him to do as Grout requests, Godber reveals that his rival Moffat has already made him agree to go down in the first round. Angered at this, Fletcher reveals that Godber's decision now means he faces trouble from either Grout or Moffatt if he helps the other. His fears are confirmed when he reveals to Grout what Godber is doing and learns he must convince Godber's opponent to take a dive instead.

On the night of the match, Fletcher informs Godber that apart from himself, either he or his opponent will face trouble if one of them takes a dive, leading to them devising a plan. When the first round begins, both boxers fake going down after they each give one punch, causing the match to end in a draw. When Fletcher reunites with Godber in his cell, he reveals that neither Grout or Moffatt have made a gains or losses, as all the bets they had arranged were voided by the result of the match. However, Fletcher admits he made a bet on the match ending in a draw and came off well as a result, and offers Godber his favourite chocolate bar to celebrate.

== Episode cast ==
Actor	Role
Ronnie Barker	Norman Stanley Fletcher
Brian Wilde	Mr Barrowclough
Fulton Mackay	Mr Mackay
Richard Beckinsale	Lennie Godber
Peter Vaughan	Harry Grout
Cyril Shaps	Jackdaw
Roy Sampson	PT Instructor
John Dair	Crusher (uncredited)
Willy Bowman	Billy Moffatt (uncredited)
