= There's No Fish Food in Heaven =

- Directed by: Eleanor E. Gaver
- Written by: Eleanor E. Gaver
- Produced by: Jane Reardon; Terence Michael; Allan Mindell
- Starring: Fairuza Balk; Noah Taylor; Téa Leoni; James LeGros; Debi Mazar; Patrick Dempsey; Jeffrey Jones; Udo Kier; Caroline Aaron; K. Todd Freeman
- Cinematography: Pascal Lebeque
- Edited by: Barbara Gies
- Music by: Smokey Hormel; Joey Waronker
- Production company: Storm Entertainment
- Release date: October 18, 1998 (Hamptons International Film Festival)
- Running time: 93 minutes
- Country: United States
- Language: English

There's No Fish Food in Heaven (also known as Life in the Fast Lane) is a 1998 American black comedy film written and directed by Eleanor E. Gaver. It premiered at the Hamptons International Film Festival on October 18, 1998.

== Synopsis ==
Jeff, a street artist, falls madly in love with fellow artist Mona, but she abandons him when she meets a mysterious stranger. To win back Mona's affections, Jeff wraps himself in a package that is mailed to her. Mona and the stranger have sex on top of the box that Jeff is hiding in. As she opens the package, Mona inadvertently kills Jeff with a pair of scissors. The ghost of Jeff remains to haunt Mona, and Mona realizes she wants to join him in the afterlife.

== Cast ==
- Fairuza Balk as Mona
- Noah Taylor as Jeff
- Téa Leoni as Mona's boss
- James LeGros as DJ
- Debi Mazar as Rosie
- Patrick Dempsey as Mysterious Stranger
- Jeffrey Jones as Minister Pete
- Udo Kier as Tenant
- Caroline Aaron as Vanessa
- K. Todd Freeman as Suzie

== Production ==
The film was shot in Los Angeles over six weeks in the fall of 1997.

== Critical reception ==
Matt Williams of The Austin Chronicle wrote, "The true brilliance of the film rests with these characters, who range from pregnant cousin Rosie (Debi Mazar) and Mona's decoupaging mother to a musically inclined minister Pete and a carjacking poet -- a character who needs to recur in every one of director Eleanor Gaver's films. These cleverly constructed characters, captured in Gaver's sunnily decrepit Los Angeles, make Fish Food excellent escapist fare." Writing for The A.V. Club, Nathan Rabin commented, "Life ambles by aimlessly if pleasantly, powered by little more than its own cheerful brand of whimsy. Its undertone of genuine sweetness makes it bearable, even when it resembles an insufferable sitcom pilot."

Variety's Oliver Jones lamented the film's lack of plot and compelling characters. He added the film "relies too much on grotesque slapstick, rather than a more satisfying brand of character comedy".
