= Powderhouse Productions =

American television production company

- Type: production company
- Industry: television
- Founded: 1994
- Headquarters: Somerville, Massachusetts
- Website: www.powderhouse.net

Powderhouse Productions is an American television production company established in 1994.

== Origins ==
As early as 1986, Powderhouse co-founders Joel Olicker and Tug Yourgrau met while working to produce a documentary for WGBH, the public television station located in Boston, Massachusetts. The collaboration on this documentary for WGBH led them to conceive their own independent production company that would focus on their own brand of nonfiction television programming. In 1994, Olicker and Yourgrau officially began work under the Powderhouse moniker. Powderhouse's first office facilities were located in the basement of a Dunkin' Donuts restaurant location in Powder House Square, Somerville, Massachusetts.

=== Meaning of the name ===
The name "Powderhouse" is derived from a conflict during the American Revolution over gunpowder stored in the Provincial Powder House (still standing in Powder House Square near Tufts University in Somerville). The province and its towns were to share the powder, but the towns had removed their allotments. When William Brattle, a Cambridge loyalist, so informed the British commander, General Thomas Gage, the British became concerned that patriot elements might seize the provincial powder as well. On September 1, 1774, British soldiers removed 250 half barrels of powder from the Powder House. One detachment marched to Cambridge and carried off two small cannons.

== The founders ==
=== Joel Olicker ===
A native New Yorker, he began his career at Valkhn Films, where he cut segments for the classic CBS children's series Captain Kangaroo. After a two-year teaching stint at Hampshire College, he was employed at WGBH, eventually editing and/or producing for the national series Nova, Frontline, The American Experience and others. At Powderhouse, he helped launch the Emmy-winning Discovery Channel series, Discover Magazine. He has produced and directed award-winning specials such as Engineering The Impossible, the Emmy-nominated series Extreme Engineering and numerous hours for the WGBH Science Unit and the Discovery Channel.

=== Tug Yourgrau ===
Tug Yourgrau is both an award-winning filmmaker and a Tony-nominated playwright. He currently serves as Executive Producer of the Raising Cain Project for PBS and as Co-Executive Producer of Extreme Engineering for The Discovery Channel. Most recently, Tourgrau completed The Great Pink Scare funded by ITVS. In 2001, Tug produced, directed and wrote Secrets, Lies, and Atomic Spies for PBS's Nova. His play The Song of Jacob Zulu, ran on Broadway in 1993 and led to six Tony nominations.

== Programs and series produced by Powderhouse Productions ==
Name:	Aired On:
Southie Rules	A&E
Dogs 101	Animal Planet
Cats 101	Animal Planet
Build It Bigger (14 episodes)	Discovery
Sliced	History
Superfetch	Animal Planet
Dogs Vs Cats	Animal Planet
A Girl's Life	PBS
America's Cutest Dog	Animal Planet
Kids By The Dozen (3 episodes)	TLC
Mysteries of the Freemasons	History
Inside Supermax	TLC
Extreme Engineering - Season 3 (6 episodes)	Discovery
Raising Cain with Michael Thompson	PBS
MegaStructures: Ultimate Oil Rigs	National Geographic Channel
MegaStructures: Berlin Train Terminal	National Geographic Channel
MegaStructures: World's Biggest Airliner	National Geographic Channel
MegaStructures: Black Gold	National Geographic Channel
The Great Pink Scare	PBS
Extreme Engineering - Season 2 (10 episodes)	Discovery
Invent This! (13 episodes)	Tech TV
Engineering Supermax Prisons	TLC
World in Balance - China Revs Up	Nova/PBS
Extreme Engineering - Season 1 (10 episodes)	Discovery
Engineering the Impossible	Discovery
The Power of Friendship with Michael Thompson	OPB
Secrets, Lies, and Atomic Spies	Nova/PBS
Great Transformations - Evolution	Nova/PBS
The Killer's Trail	Nova/PBS
Mummies - The Real Story	Discovery Channel
Inside the US Mint	Discovery
Inside the World's Mightiest Bank	Discovery
