= Gregg Edelman =

American movie, television, & theatre actor (born 1958)

- Born: September 12, 1958 (age 67); Chicago, Illinois, U.S.
- Occupations: theatre, film, voice, television actor
- Years active: 1979–present
- Known for: City of Angels; Into the Woods; Cabaret
- Spouse: Carolee Carmello (1995–2015)
- Children: 2

Gregg Edelman (born September 12, 1958) is an American actor. He has starred in numerous Broadway productions earning four Tony Award nominations for his roles in City of Angels (1990), Anna Karenina (1993), 1776 (1998), and Into the Woods (2002). His other Broadway credits include Cabaret (1987), Anything Goes (1989), Falsettos (1992), Passion (1994), Les Misérables (1999), The Mystery of Edwin Drood (2012), and Water for Elephants (2024).

Edelman made his film debut in The Manhattan Project (1989). Edelman has since acted in films such as Crimes and Misdemeanors (1989), Spider-Man 2 (2004), Little Children (2006), The Proposal (2009), and She Said (2022). He has also taken recurring roles in shows such as the NBC police procedural Shades of Blue, the Netflix political drama House of Cards, and the USA Network series The Sinner.

== Early life and education ==
Edelman was born in Chicago, Illinois, attended Niles North High School, where he starred as Li'l Abner opposite future soap star Nancy Lee Grahn, and was trained at Northwestern University (Evanston, Illinois).

== Career ==
He made his professional debut in the 1979 tour of Evita and started attracting attention for his performance as Cliff in the 1987 Broadway revival of Cabaret. He was nominated for a Tony Award for his performance as the Wolf and Cinderella's Prince in the first Broadway revival of Into the Woods.

== Personal life ==
He was married from 1995 to 2015 to actress Carolee Carmello; they first met during the run of City of Angels, and later during another production. They have two children, a daughter Zoe and son Ethan.

Friend and Academy Award winning actor J.K. Simmons credited Edelman for helping him when he was a struggling actor.

== Acting credits ==
=== Film ===
Year	Title	Role	Notes	Ref.
1986	The Manhattan Project	Science Teacher		
1989	Crimes and Misdemeanors	Chris		
1990	Green Card	Phil		
1996	The First Wives Club	Mark Loest		
1997	Hudson River Blues	Dudley		
1997	Beauty and the Beast: The Enchanted Christmas	Chorus	Voice; uncredited	
1997	Anastasia	Ensemble	Voice	
1998	Buster & Chauncey's Silent Night	Father Joseph	Singing voice	
1999	Cradle Will Rock	Blitzstein		
1999	Puppet	Oscar		
2002	Hollywood Ending	Galaxie Executive		
2002	City by the Sea	A.P.C. Johnson		
2004	Spider-Man 2	Dr. Davis		
2006	Little Children	Richard Pierce		
2009	The Proposal	Lead Cousin Malloy		
2012	Liberal Arts	Robert		
2014	Night Has Settled	Dr. Root		
2015	Jane Wants a Boyfriend	Father		
2016	Larchmont	Arthur Burch		
2019	All the Little Things We Kill	Agent Bracken		
2022	She Said	David McCraw		
2023	She Came to Me	Dustin Haverford		

=== Television ===
Year	Title	Role	Notes	Ref.
1985	Spenser: For Hire	Dr. Ed Howard	Episode: "The Killer Within"	
1996	Central Park West	Concierge	Episode: "Public Execution"	
1996	Passion	Colonel Ricci	Filmed musical production	
2001	Ed	Tom Respaldi	Episode: "Hook, Line and Sinker"	
2003	Hack	Ryan Ambrose	5 episodes	
2005	Law & Order: Criminal Intent	Boyce Wainwright	Episode: "Ex Stasis"	
2003–2005	Law & Order: Special Victims Unit	Dr. Lucas / Daniel Brown	2 episodes	
2009	Law & Order	Toshack's Attorney	Episode: "All New"	
2009	The Good Wife	Aaron Abbott	Episode: "Unorthodox"	
2010	Mercy	Mr. Noland	Episode: "There is No Superwoman"	
2010	As the World Turns	Leland Price	1 Episode	
2011	Onion SportsDome	Evan Collier	Episode 1.7	
2012	30 Rock	Dr. Melvoin	Episode: "Standards and Practices"	
2014	Blue Bloods	Seymour Kerwin	Episode: "Secret Arrangements"	
2016	Shades of Blue	Priest	2 episodes	
2016	Deadbeat	Pharmacist	Episode: "Hawk Smith"	
2016	BrainDead	Dr. Matthews Falcon	Episode: "The Path to War, Part 2"	
2017	Madame Secretary	Pay Findaly	Episode: "Persona Non Grata"	
2018	House of Cards	Stan Durant	3 episodes	
2018	The Marvelous Mrs. Maisel	Stan	Episode: "Vote for Kennedy, Vote for Kennedy"	
2019	Evil	Rodney Match	Episode: "October 31"	
2020	The Sinner	Philosophy Professor	2 episodes	
2020	Billions	Chairman of the Board	Episode: "The Limitless Shit"	

=== Theatre ===
Year	Title	Role	Venue	Ref.
1980	Camelot	Lancelot	Marriott Theatre, Illinois	
1980	Evita	Ensemble	US National Tour	
1984	Oliver!	Londoner	Mark Hellinger Theatre, Broadway	
1986	Cats	Bustopher Jones / Gus / Growltiger (replacement)	Winter Garden Theatre, Broadway	
1987	Cabaret	Clifford Bradshaw	Imperial Theatre, Broadway	
1987	Cabaret	Clifford Bradshaw	US National Tour	
1989	Anything Goes	Billy Crocker	Vivian Beaumont Theatre, Broadway	
1989	City of Angels	Stine	Virginia Theatre, Broadway	
1991	Arthur the Musical	Arthur	Goodspeed Opera House	
1992	Anna Karenina	Constantine Levin	Circle in the Square Theatre, Broadway	
1993	Greetings	Andy Gorski	Off-Broadway	
1993	Falsettos	Marvin	US National Tour	
1993	Falsettos	Marvin (replacement)	John Golden Theatre, Broadway	
1994	Passion	Colonel Ricci	Plymouth Theatre, Broadway	
1997	1776	Edward Rutledge	Criterion Center, Broadway	
1999	Les Misérables	Javert (replacement)	Imperial Theatre, Broadway	
2001	Thief River	Ray 2 / Reese	Off-Broadway	
2001	Reefer Madness	Lecturer	Off-Broadway	
2002	Into the Woods	The Wolf / Cinderella's Prince	Ahmanson Theatre, Los Angeles	
2002	Into the Woods	The Wolf / Cinderella's Prince	Broadhurst Theatre, Broadway	
2003	Wonderful Town	Robert Baker	Al Hirschfeld Theatre, Broadway	
2004	Opening Doors	Performer	Concert	
2005	Flight	Charles Lindbergh	Off-Broadway	
2006	Rags	Nathan	World AIDS Day Concert, New York City	
2008	A Tale of Two Cities	Dr. Alexandre Manette	Al Hirschfeld Theatre, Broadway	
2008	Show Boat	Steve	Carnegie Hall	
2011	Sweeney Todd: The Demon Barber of Fleet Street	Sweeney Todd	The Drury Lane Theatre	
2012	The Mystery of Edwin Drood	Reverend Mr. Crisparkle	Studio 54, Broadway	
2013	Secondhand Lions: A New Musical	Garth	5th Avenue Theatre, Seattle	
2014	A Little Night Music	Fredrik Egerman	Stockbridge	
2015	First Wives Club	Aaron	Chicago	
2017	Candide	Voltaire	New York City Opera	
2020	The Perplexed	Ted Resnik	New York City Center	
2024	Water for Elephants	Mr. Jankowski	Imperial Theatre, Broadway	

== Awards and nominations ==
Year	Association	Category	Project	Result	Ref.
1990	Tony Award	Best Actor in a Musical	City of Angels	Nominated	
1993	Tony Award	Best Featured Actor in a Musical	Anna Karenina	Nominated	
1998	Tony Award	Best Featured Actor in a Musical	1776	Nominated	
2002	Tony Award	Best Featured Actor in a Musical	Into the Woods	Nominated	
1998	Drama Desk Award	Outstanding Featured Actor in a Musical	1776	Won	
2002	Drama Desk Award	Outstanding Featured Actor in a Musical	Into the Woods	Nominated	
1998	Outer Critics Circle Award	Outstanding Featured Actor in a Musical	1776	Nominated	
2004	Outer Critics Circle Award	Outstanding Actor in a Musical	Wonderful Town	Nominated	
