= K. Todd Freeman =

American actor

- Freeman in 2026
- Born: Kenneth Todd Freeman; July 9, 1965 (age 61); Houston, Texas, U.S.
- Education: University of North Carolina School of the Arts (BFA)

Kenneth Todd Freeman (born July 9, 1965) is an American actor. He has been nominated for two Tony Awards over the course of his career and has won one Drama Desk Award, and one Obie Award for Sustained Achievement in performance. He has played supporting roles in films such as Grosse Pointe Blank (1997) and The Cider House Rules (1999), played a prominent recurring role as Mr. Trick on Buffy the Vampire Slayer (1998–1999), and was a series regular as Mr. Poe on A Series of Unfortunate Events (2017–2019). He is an ensemble member at Steppenwolf Theatre Company and has appeared in many of their plays, and subsequent Broadway and Off-Broadway transfers, notably Airline Highway, Downstate, The Song of Jacob Zulu, and One Flew Over the Cuckoo's Nest.

== Life and career ==
Born in Houston, Texas, Freeman went to the local High School for the Performing and Visual Arts before later graduating from the University of North Carolina School of the Arts in 1987.

Freeman has been an ensemble member of the Steppenwolf Theatre Company in Chicago, Illinois since 1993. In the same year, he was nominated for the Tony Award for Best Actor in a Play for his lead performance in the Apartheid drama The Song of Jacob Zulu. More recently, Freeman has played the role of Doctor Dillamond from Wicked in the first North American tour, Chicago and Broadway productions. In 2015, he was nominated for his second Tony Award, this time for Best Featured Actor in a Play as Sissy Na Na in Airline Highway. He won the Drama Desk Award for Outstanding Featured Actor in a Play for the same role.

He has also had supporting roles in various films such as Eraser (1996), Grosse Pointe Blank (1997), The Cider House Rules (1999), and The Dark Knight (2008). On television, he earned a recurring role on Buffy the Vampire Slayer as Mr. Trick.

He performed in the Steppenwolf Theatre Company's production of Downstate, which concluded its run on November 18, 2018. It later transferred to Playwrights Horizons and Freeman was nominated for his second Drama Desk Award for Outstanding Featured Actor in a Play, and won an Obie Award for Sustained Achievement in Performance for his role as Dee. In 2026, he reprised the role of Dee in the Broadway production of Downstate.

He portrayed Mr. Poe in the 2017 Netflix comedy drama series A Series of Unfortunate Events.

== Filmography ==
=== Theatre ===
Year	Title	Role	Venue	Ref.
1989	Ubu	Boleslas/Michel Federovich/Russian Soldier	Off-Broadway, Mitzi Newhouse Theatre	
1992	Angels in America	Belize	Los Angeles	
1993	The Song of Jacob Zulu	Jacob Zulu	Broadway, Plymouth Theatre	
1997	Uncle Tom's Cabin	Performer	Off-Broadway, Greenwich House Theatre	
2001	One Flew Over the Cuckoo's Nest	Dr. Spivey	Broadway, Royale Theatre	
2011	The Intelligent Homosexual's Guide to Capitalism and Socialism with a Key to the Scriptures	Paul	Off-Broadway, The Public Theater	
2013	Fetch Clay, Make Man	Stepin Fetchit	Off-Broadway, New York Theatre Workshop	
2014	Wicked	Dr. Dillamond	Broadway, George Gershwin Theatre	
2015	Airline Highway	Sissy Na Na	Broadway, Samuel J. Friedman Theatre	
2018	Downstate	Dee	Chicago, Steppenwolf Theatre	
2019	Downstate	Dee	London, Royal National Theatre	
2020	The Minutes	Mr. Blake	Broadway, Cort Theatre	
2022	The Minutes	Mr. Blake	Broadway, Studio 54	
2023	Downstate	Dee	Off-Broadway, Playwrights Horizons	
2024	Corruption	Chris Bryant / Simon Kelner	Off-Broadway, Mitzi Newhouse Theatre	
2025	Prince Faggot	Performer 2	Off-Broadway, Playwrights Horizons	
2026	Death of a Salesman	Charley	Broadway, Winter Garden Theatre	
2026	Downstate	Dee	Broadway, Booth Theatre	

=== Film ===
Year	Title	Role	Notes
1990	Street Hunter	Pretzel	
1991	Ricochet	Talk Show Guest	
1991	Grand Canyon	'Wipe'	
1994	Full Cycle	Clerk	
1995	Jeffrey	Barney's Waitor	
1996	Eraser	FBI Agent Dutton	
1996	House Arrest	Officer Davis	
1997	Grosse Pointe Blank	NSA Agent Kenneth McCullers	
1997	The End of Violence	Six O One	
1998	There's No Fish Food in Heaven	Stan / Suzie	
1999	The Cider House Rules	Muddy	
2008	The Dark Knight	Polk	
2008	The Lucky Ones	Detective # 2	
2014	Teenage Mutant Ninja Turtles	Dr. Baxter Stockman	
2015	Anesthesia	Joe	
2017	Pirates of the Caribbean: Dead Men Tell No Tales	Captain Morgan	
2018	Weightless	Dr. Mcleod	
2021	Naked Singularity	Jimmy	
2021	The Same Storm	Leon Robinson	
2025	Bird in Hand	Bower	
2026	The Debut	Martin Reed	

=== Television ===
Year	Title	Role	Notes
1991	A Different World	Novian Winters	Episode: "Monet Is the Root of All Evil"
1991	The Killing Mind	Fred Robinson	TV movie
1992	Brooklyn Bridge	Scoot	Episode: "On the Road"
1993	Tracey Ullman Takes on New York	Byron	TV movie
1993	Ghostwriter	Malenga	Episode: "Lost in Brooklyn: Part 1"
1995	Strange Luck	Driving Instructor	Episode: "Over Exposure"
1995–97	NYPD Blue	Arthur Cartwell	3 episodes
1996	Sisters	Chardonay/Larry	2 episodes
1996–97	Dangerous Minds	Jerome Griffin	17 episodes
1998	Touched by an Angel	Vincent 'Vinegar' Finegar	Episode: "Doodlebugs"
1998–99	Buffy the Vampire Slayer	Mr. Trick	5 episodes
2000	City of Angels		Episode: "Cry Me a Liver"
2011	A Gifted Man	Officer Dale Woodrow	Episode: "In Case of Exposure"
2014	Believe	Gary Wise	Episode: "Together"
2014	Elementary	Raphael	Episode: "Terra Pericolosa"
2015	Law & Order: Special Victims Unit	Mr. Reynolds	Episode: "Community Policing"
2016	Blindspot	Marcus	Episode: "One Begets Technique"
2016	The OA	Masters	Episode: "Homecoming"
2017–19	A Series of Unfortunate Events	Mr. Poe	22 episodes
2019	The Blacklist	Hobbs	Episode: "The Osterman Umbrella Company"
2019	God Friended Me	Bishop Thompson	2 episodes
2020	High Maintenance	Bill	Episode: "Backflash"
2021	FBI: Most Wanted	Linwood Williams	Episode: "Run-Hide-Fight"
2022	The Last Days of Ptolemy Grey	Darwin Andrews	Episode: "Coydog"
2022	The Rehearsal	Fake Kor	Episode: "Orange Juice, No Pulp"
2023	The Horror of Dolores Roach	Jeremiah	8 episodes
2025	Will Trent	Carver	Episode: "No Faith in Second Chances"

== Awards and nominations ==
=== Theatre ===
Year	Award	Category	Work	Result
1993	Tony Award	Best Performance by a Leading Actor in a Play	The Song of Jacob Zulu	Nominated
2013	Obie Award	Performance	Fetch Clay, Make Man	Won
2015	Tony Award	Best Performance by a Featured Actor in a Play	Airline Highway	Nominated
2015	Drama Desk Award	Outstanding Featured Actor in a Play	Airline Highway	Won
2019	Evening Standard Theatre Award	Best Actor	Downstate	Nominated
2023	Drama Desk Award	Outstanding Featured Performance in a Play	Downstate	Nominated
2023	Obie Award	Sustained Achievement in Performance	Downstate	Won
2026	Dorian Award	Outstanding Featured Performance in an Off-Broadway Production	Prince Faggot	Nominated
