= The Desperate Hours (Porridge) =

- Porridge episode
- Episode no.: Episode Christmas Special 2
- Directed by: Sydney Lotterby
- Written by: Dick Clement; Ian La Frenais
- Original air date: 24 December 1976

Episode chronology
← Previous "No Way Out"	Next → "A Storm in a Teacup"

"The Desperate Hours" is the second Christmas special of the BBC sitcom Porridge. It first aired on 24 December 1976. In this episode, Fletcher and Godber are in trouble for brewing liquor in the lead-up to Christmas, but are caught up in a hostage situation in the Governor's office. It was the only episode of Porridge to air in 1976.

== Synopsis ==
It is nearly time for Christmas, and Fletcher has been making wine for the prisoners of Slade Prison. The Governor, who is strictly teetotal, has a zero tolerance on illicit drinking in Slade Prison. After Mr Barrowclough fails to discover alcohol in Fletcher and Godber's cell, Fletcher reveals to Godber that he hid the booze in their metal bedpost. Unfortunately, Mr Mackay catches them in the act, and takes them to see the Governor.

It turns out that the Governor is feeling ill with an upset stomach, and has to keep running to the toilet. Urwin, the new trusty, comes in with the Governor's cup of tea. As the Governor is making another visit to the toilet, Urwin reveals his plan. He produces a gun and takes Barrowclough and the Governor's secretary, Mrs Jamieson, hostage.

Urwin makes Mackay leave and forces Barrowclough to phone the nearest RAF base to demand a helicopter and £10,000 in used notes. Word soon gets out about the kidnapping; however, Fletcher and Godber are also implicated in it. Mackay arrives with several cups of coffee, which Urwin accepts. One of these cups is drugged, and intended to knock out Urwin, but Barrowclough messes up the procedure and Fletcher drinks it instead and falls asleep.

While Fletcher is fast asleep, it is revealed that Barrowclough has been having an affair with Mrs Jamieson. Upon waking up, Fletcher requests to look at Urwin's file. It turns out that he has been recommended for psychiatric treatment several times before, but has been turned down. Fletcher persuades Urwin to give him the gun and to give himself up. Godber is amazed at Fletcher's bravery, but Fletcher knew the gun was a fake as he saw Urwin make it in the hobby shop. Fletcher fires the gun in the air to prove his point, and the shot hits the ceiling, showering them with plaster, meaning that the gun was in fact loaded. Luckily, no one is hurt.

Later, Barrowclough visits Fletcher and informs him that Urwin is now receiving psychiatric treatment like he requested. Also, the charges against Fletcher and Godber of brewing the illegal alcohol have been dropped. Barrowclough asks Fletcher to forget about the affair between him and Mrs Jamieson. Fletcher points out that he was asleep during this revelation, but then calls Barrowclough "Henry", revealing that he was not entirely unconscious and had heard the conversation.

== Episode cast ==
Actor	Role
Ronnie Barker	Norman Stanley Fletcher
Brian Wilde	Mr Barrowclough
Fulton Mackay	Mr Mackay
Richard Beckinsale	Lennie Godber
Dudley Sutton	Reg Urwin
Sam Kelly	Warren
Tony Osoba	McLaren
Ken Wynne	Keegan
Michael Redfern	Tulip
Michael Barrington	Governor Venables
Jane Wenham	Mrs Jamieson
Pat Gorman	Prisoner Officer (uncredited)
