= No Way Out (DJ Trevi song) =

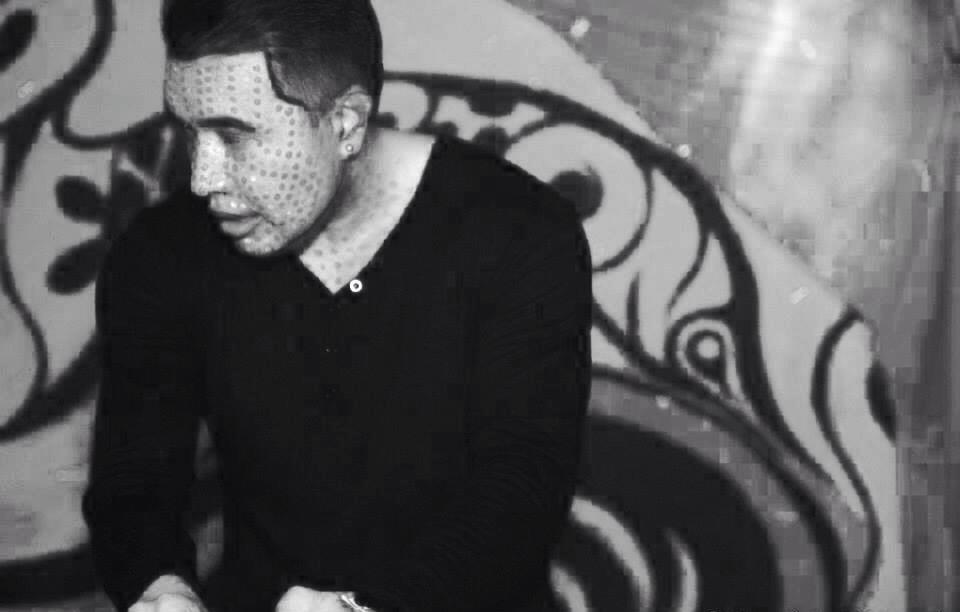
- DJ Trevi performing at Lexington Bar in Los Angeles

Single by Dj Trevi

from the album No Way Out
- Released: 14 August 2012
- Recorded: 2012
- Genre: Electro house
- Length: 5:30 (Original Mix)
- Label: CS Recordings
- Songwriter(s): Treavor Alvarado
- Producer(s): Dj Trevi

Dj Trevi singles chronology
"Love" (2011)	"No Way Out" (2012)	"Movin'" (2013)

"No Way Out" is a song by American electronic music producer DJ Trevi. It is his second single, released on August 14, 2012. The song was released to fair reviews, and by 2013 it had caught the eye of many blogs, who featured it as song of the week. The song appeared on many wave.me top ten charts such as Krewella Troll Mix Submission. Within days the video had reached 120,000 views on YouTube. By the end of 2013 the song had been nominated for Best Dance/Electronic single of year at the 23rd Annual LA Music Awards.

== Awards ==
=== LA Music Awards ===
In November 2013, DJ Trevi was nominated for best dance single of the year.

Year	Nominee / work	Award	Result
2013	"No Way Out"	Best Dance/Electronic Single of Year	Nominated
