= A Storm in a Teacup (Porridge) =

- Porridge episode
- Episode no.: Season 3 Episode 1
- Directed by: Sydney Lotterby
- Written by: Dick Clement; Ian La Frenais
- Original air date: 18 February 1977

Episode chronology
← Previous "The Desperate Hours"	Next → "Poetic Justice"

"A Storm in a Teacup" is an episode of the BBC sitcom Porridge. It aired on 18 February 1977. In this episode, Fletcher is tasked by Grouty to replace a bottle of pills Harris stole. But there is a surprise for Fletcher in his teacup.

== Synopsis ==
The episode opens in Fletcher’s cell where he is reading the book Mandingo. Warren and McLaren interrupt him. Fletcher leaves his cell and goes downstairs in an attempt to read in peace. However, Fletcher is interrupted again by Mr Mackay shouting at Harris on the landing. Harris has his arm in a sling, but Mackay believes he stole some pills from the medical officer. As Mackay is frisking Harris, the bottle of pills falls out of Harris' trouser leg and lands in Fletcher’s tea.

Later, Fletcher returns to his cell where he discusses Harris' predicament with Godber. Fletcher makes it clear to Godber that he does not stand for drugs.

After Mackay fails to find any pills on Harris, he is forced to let Harris go. Harris is smug until dragged into Harry Grout's cell. Grouty interrogates Harris over the pills incident, but Harris denies taking them. Grouty responds by grabbing Harris' injured arm, causing him to scream in pain.

Grouty and his henchman Crusher confront Fletcher over the missing pills. Harris told Grouty that he dropped the pills off the landing near to where Fletcher and Lukewarm were sitting at the time. Grouty knows that Lukewarm would not become involved with drugs, so Fletcher is the prime suspect. Grouty wants the pills returned to the Medical Officer, as it is interfering with his own pill-peddling operation. Fletcher is tasked with returning the bottle of pills within the hour. Godber mentions to Fletcher that Barrowclough's vitamin pills could make a good substitute.

Just then, Mr Barrowclough visits Fletcher and Godber's cell. Fletcher gets on the subject of vitamin tablets, and Barrowclough has some for indigestion, which he is able to spare. Unfortunately, these are too big compared to the pills in the hospital. To make matters worse, Barrowclough discovers the pills that Harris stole are in Fletcher's mug, although he does not say anything about it.

Godber falls out with Fletcher over the constant derogatory remarks towards his tapioca pudding. Fletcher tells him that they need to worry about that later as the threat of retribution from Grouty is far more important. Harris shows up, much to Fletcher's displeasure. However, Harris confesses that he already has bottles of pills which he had previously stolen and which could be used as a substitute. However, Harris wants Fletcher to pay him for the pills. Godber attempts to appeal to Harris' better nature, which Fletcher points out is fruitless as Harris "doesn't have one". Instead of paying Harris, Fletcher responds by grabbing Harris' injured arm, causing more screaming.

Fletcher hands a different bottle of pills to Grouty, hoping that he will not be bothered by him anymore. Fletcher is annoyed as the fiasco has cost him his lunch hour. It turns out that Grouty is in charge of the swimming pool, in spite of the fact that Slade Prison does not have one. Grouty puts this down to a "clerical error".

To add insult to injury, Fletcher returns to his cell that evening to find Godber reading Mandingo. Fletcher berates Godber for losing his place and for not emptying the mugs. Fletcher discovers the pills Harris stole earlier that day were in his mug all the time. Hearing Mackay's voice, they decide to swallow the pills they were holding. Mackay suspects the men are up to no good and catches Fletcher with the pill box in his left hand. Fletcher says they were for his "nervous indigestion". Mackay warns Fletcher to be careful, as he nearly caught Harris stealing pills earlier that day. Mackay also notes that the pills belonged to the Medical Officer but were for his dog's bad breath. The episode ends with Fletcher telling Godber he feels "rough, ruff, ruff, ruff" in the style of a dog barking.

== Episode cast ==
Actor	Role
Ronnie Barker	Norman Stanley Fletcher
Brian Wilde	Mr Barrowclough
Fulton Mackay	Mr Mackay
Richard Beckinsale	Lennie Godber
Peter Vaughan	Harry Grout
Ronald Lacey	Harris
Sam Kelly	Warren
Tony Osoba	McLaren
Christopher Biggins	Lukewarm
John Moore	Spider
John Dair	Crusher
