= Sliced =

- Starring: John McCalmont; Budd Kelley
- Original language: English
- No. of seasons: 1
- No. of episodes: 17

Production
- Running time: 30 minutes (including commercials)
- Production company: Powderhouse Productions

Original release
- Network: History Channel
- Release: April 22 – June 29, 2010

Sliced is an American television series that premiered on April 22, 2010 on the History Channel. The program was hosted by John McCalmont and Budd Kelley, who slice everyday objects in half to uncover how they work. The show aired on Thursdays at 10:00 pm Eastern Time, with three episodes airing on a Saturday afternoon, and the last airing on a Thursday at 8:00 pm Eastern Time.

== Episodes ==
=== Season 1 (2010) ===
The first season consisted of 17 episodes.

No.	Title	Original Airdate	Summary	Items Sliced
1	"Coin Operated"	April 22, 2010	Coin-operated machines are sliced apart with the goal of seeing if there are mechanisms that prevent cheating. Among the items sliced are a pinball machine, a slot machine, and a pool table.	Pinball machine, a slot machine, and a pool table
2	"Armored Vehicle"	April 22, 2010	An armored van is sliced apart.	Armored van
3	"Toys"	April 29, 2010	Toys are sliced apart including the Magic 8 Ball, an Etch A Sketch, and toy cars.	Claw machine, Magic 8 Ball, an Etch A Sketch, and toy cars
4	"Confidential Kitchen"	April 29, 2010	A refrigerator, a stove, and a garbage disposal are sliced.	Refrigerator, a stove, and a garbage disposal
5	"Fire Truck"	May 6, 2010	A fire truck is sliced.	Fire truck
6	"Power Tools"	May 6, 2010	Power tools are sliced.	Power tools
7	"Saloon"	May 13, 2010	Beer taps, a jukebox, a mechanical bull, and a ride on rodeo bull are sliced.	Beer tap, a jukebox, and a mechanical bull
8	"Bathroom Disaster"	May 13, 2010	A toilet, a hair dryer, and a shower are sliced.	Toilet, blowdryer, and a shower
9	"Golf"	May 20, 2010	Golf equipment is dissected	Golf balls, golf club (driver), electric golf cart, industrial leaf vacuum
10	"Spy Car"	May 20, 2010	A custom-built spy car with a flame thrower and smoke screen is examined.	Spy car
11	"Vending Machines"	May 27, 2010	A vending machine is examined.	Vending machine
12	"Garbage Truck"	May 27, 2010	A garbage truck is examined.	Garbage truck
13	"All Terrain"	June 19, 2010		
14	"Bowling Alley"	June 19, 2010	A whole bowling alley is dissected.	Bowling alley
15	"Bank Heist"	June 19, 2010	Many types of security equipment including safes, door locks, and Bank safes are examined.	
16	"Electronics"	June 24, 2010	Several electronics are examined, and the advances made between old and new products are observed.	Two televisions (one CRT and one LCD), a subwoofer, two Polaroid cameras (one 600 series instant film, one digital), noise-cancelling headphones
17	"Robots"	June 29, 2010	Some Robots are dissected.	A Smart Bot (rolling robot), RoboQuad (a four-legged robot), Zoltar (a fortune telling robot), and a robot vacuum cleaner.
