= No Way Out (Porridge) =

- Porridge episode
- Episode no.: Episode Christmas Special 1
- Directed by: Sydney Lotterby
- Written by: Dick Clement; Ian La Frenais
- Original air date: 24 December 1975

Episode chronology
| ← Previous "The Harder They Fall" | Next → "The Desperate Hours" |

"No Way Out" is the first Christmas special of the BBC sitcom Porridge and initially aired on 24 December 1975. In this episode, prisoner Tommy Slocombe makes an escape attempt in the lead-up to Christmas.

== Synopsis ==
Christmas has come to Slade Prison, which Godber, with his innocent nature, is looking forward to, before Fletcher tells him that Christmas in prison, is little different to any other day. Godber points out that there are carol singers, but Fletcher tells him they are only in place to cover the sound of a tunnel being dug by Tommy Slocombe.

Fletcher tries to visit the prison's infirmary with his bad knee, but the prison doctor refuses to admit him. Instead, he gives Fletcher an appointment at a civilian hospital, Carlisle General. On hearing of this, Harry Grout (Grouty) orders Fletcher to pick up an important object from a nurse at the hospital.

Mr Barrowclough is given the job of escorting Fletcher to hospital, although he finds Fletcher's constant grumbling very tiresome. At the hospital, a young nurse gives Fletcher a "Christmas card", which turns out to be a fake passport for Tommy Slocombe. Back at the hospital, Grouty also makes Fletcher and Godber join the choir and tells Fletcher to get hold of a bicycle.

Barrowclough's bicycle is stolen as part of the escape plan and he is berated by Mr Mackay for being too trusting with the prisoners. To make matters worse, Mackay then discovers what is going on with the tunnelling and orders the men back to their cells. In the fracas, Lukewarm, a skilled pickpocket, manages to steal Barrowclough's watch and Mackay's wallet.

Due to these events, Christmas is cancelled in Slade Prison. Fletcher realises that things have gone too far and speaks to Harry Grout, who admits that the tunnel is off course anyway. Fletcher arranges to have a word with Mackay; his plan is for Mackay to fall into the tunnel and in the distraction, Slocombe can be smuggled out another way. Unfortunately Fletcher miscalculates the tunnel's location and ends up falling into it himself.

With the escape attempt apparently thwarted, Christmas is reinstated. Fletcher is in the infirmary following his fall and whilst he is eating Christmas lunch, Mackay bribes him with a small bottle of whisky, to tell him where the earth from the tunnel was hidden. Fletcher tells him that they dug another tunnel and hid the earth there, the episode ending with a triumphant Fletcher drinking the whisky and wishing Mackay a Merry Christmas.

== Episode cast ==
| Actor | Role |
|---|---|
| Ronnie Barker | Norman Stanley Fletcher |
| Brian Wilde | Mr Barrowclough |
| Fulton Mackay | Mr Mackay |
| Richard Beckinsale | Lennie Godber |
| Peter Vaughan | Harry Grout |
| Graham Crowden | Prison Doctor |
| Sam Kelly | Warren |
| Christopher Biggins | Lukewarm |
| Carol Hawkins | Sandra |
| Elisabeth Day | Nurse |

== Notes ==
- It has been established that Warren cannot read. However, he is seen holding a hymn book while singing in the choir. It could be however, that due to the choir singing the same four carols over and over, that he has memorised the lyrics as he is not seen reading from the book itself.
- Mackay mentions that he went to the Governor's sherry party. However, it is revealed in the following year's Christmas special that the Governor is teetotal. Although it is entirely feasible that the Governor could throw a sherry party without drinking alcohol himself.
