= Kids by the Dozen =

- Official logo
- Starring: The Arndt family The Heppner family The Jeub family The Sentman family The Winter family The Gonya family The Cason family
- Country of origin: United States
- Original language: English
- No. of seasons: 2
- No. of episodes: 9

Production
- Production company: Powderhouse Productions

Original release
- Network: TLC
- Release: January 15 – November 12, 2007

Kids By The Dozen is a reality television series about large families. The series was produced by Powderhouse Productions.

== Cast ==
=== Arndt Family ===
- Parents: Rick & Cathy (14 children)
- Children: Paul, John, Mark, Luke, Jude, James, Philip, Seth, Jacob, Nathan, Mary Elizabeth, Caleb, Peter, and David.

=== Jeub Family ===
- Parents: Chris & Wendy (16 children)
- Children: Alicia, Alissa, Cynthia, Lydia, Isaiah, Micah, Noah, Tabitha, Keilah, Hannah, Josiah, Havilah, Joshua, Priscilla, Zechariah, and Elijah
- As of February 2012 the children ranged in age from 28 years old to 9 months.

=== Heppner Family ===
- Parents: DuWayne & Miriam (17 children)
- Children: Jemima, Benjamin, Samuel, Josiah, Joseph, Abraham, Micah, Moses, Solomon, Joanna, Susanna, Abigael, Elizabeth, Zachariah, Rebecca, Rachael, and Avianna (all biological except one).

=== Sentman Family ===
- Parents: John Robert & Beth (17 children)
- Children: Jessica Leigh, 30, Joseph Gabriel, 29, Mary Rebecca, 28, Anna Christine and John Andrew, 26, Alexis Gerard, 24, Michael Dominic, 22, Philip Gregory, 21, Philomena Therese, 19, Vincent Thomas, 17, Virginia Clare, 16, Richard Louis, 14, Edmund Campion, 13, William Mahlon, 11, Ryan Patrick, 9, Robert Hugh, 8, Timothy Daniel, 4 as of 2007 - Grandchildren: Mahdi, Joseph, Sophia, Abe, Daniel, and Sajed Jaffal as of 2012

=== Cason Family ===
- Parents: Dave & Christi (18 Children )
- Children: Jessica, Chad, Dalton, Austin, Bailey, Gage, Kaylee, Harper, Emma, Rebekah, Trevor, Walker, Morgan, Laura, Sawyer, Nathaniel, Vaughn and baby Farryn in November 2015. Daughter Jessica had Jaedyn (girl) born February 2013, the Cason's first Grandchild. Jessica gave birth to her 2nd daughter Charlie in November 2015. Third granddaughter Melody was born in 2017.

=== Gonya Family ===
- Parents: Jay & Janine (12 children as of 2007)
- Children: Joshua, Erin, Emily, Patrick, Luke, Olivia, Peter, James, Joseph, Maggie, William, Grace.

In the four years following the show they had had four more children (twins Michael and Meaghan, followed by singletons Bridgette and Caroline), making 16 children in total.

=== Clarke Family ===
- Parents: Tim & Michele Clarke.

Children: Timothy, Bradley, Kaylee** (Married to Bradley), Dylan, Amanda, David, Meghan, Emily, Brendan, and Logan. As of 2013, 10 Children.
