= Daniel Levine (composer) =

Daniel Levine is a composer/arranger/producer/pianist born on March 28, 1949, and graduated from The Manhattan School of Music in NYC. He wrote the music for the Broadway musical Anna Karenina (1992), and received a 1993 Tony Award nomination for Best Original Score. Levine had also conducted a rendition of "The Entertainer" (1902) by Scott Joplin for Valentino Production Music. He wrote and arranged several orchestral pieces for The Dick Cavett Show, composed and/or arranged music for TV and radio including the theme songs for the game shows, What's My Line and I've Got A Secret. He produced the Original Cast Recording of the Off Broadway Musical, Thunder Knocking On the Door. Levine produced, arranged, orchestrated, and played keyboards on the Leslie Uggams album, On My Way To You.
