= The Song of Jacob Zulu =

Play by Tug Yourgrau

- Original language: English
- Written by: Tug Yourgrau
- Genre: Drama
- Setting: South Africa

Premiere
- Date: March 24, 1993

The Song of Jacob Zulu is an American play that debuted on Broadway in 1993. Written by Tug Yourgrau, with lyrics by Tug Yourgrau and Ladysmith Black Mambazo and music by Ladysmith Black Mambazo and produced by the Steppenwolf Theatre Company, the play is a drama set during Apartheid in South Africa. The play's Broadway production was nominated for six Tony Awards, including Best Play, Best Actor in a Play for K. Todd Freeman, and Best Featured Actor in a Play for Zakes Mokae.

== Awards and nominations ==
=== Original Broadway production ===
Year	Award	Category	Nominee	Result
1993	Tony Award	Best Play		Nominated
1993	Tony Award	Best Actor in a Play	K. Todd Freeman	Nominated
1993	Tony Award	Best Featured Actor in a Play	Zakes Mokae	Nominated
1993	Tony Award	Best Original Score	Ladysmith Black Mambazo & Tug Yourgrau	Nominated
1993	Tony Award	Best Costume Design	Erin Quigley	Nominated
1993	Tony Award	Best Direction of a Play	Eric Simonson	Nominated
