= Tug Yourgrau =

American playwright and TV producer

Tuggelin (Tug) Yourgrau is an American playwright and TV producer. He is the President of Powderhouse Productions in Somerville, Massachusetts.

== Early life and education ==
Yourgrau was born in South Africa and moved to America at the age of 10. He graduated from Denver South High School, then from Swarthmore College with a degree in philosophy, and received a master's in history from Boston University.

== Career ==
After periods of odd jobs, he became a producer at WGBH-TV where he met Joel Olicker. Together they formed their TV production company, Powderhouse Productions.

== Works ==
=== Film ===
- Thy Kingdom Come... Thy Will Be Done (1988)- Associate Producer

=== Television ===
- Engineering the Impossible (2002)- Consultant
- Secrets, Lies and Atomic Spies (2002)- Producer, Director, Writer
- Inside the U.S Mint (2000)- Director, Narrator, Producer
- Killer's Trail (2000)- Consultant
- Mummies: The Real Story (1999)- Producer, Director
- Machine That Changed the World (1992)- Narrator
- Discovering Psychology (1991)- Producer
- Living Against the Odds (1991)- Writer, Producer, Director
- Cats 101 (2012)- Executive Producer
- Must Love Cats (2012)- Executive Producer
- Pets 101 (2012)- Executive Producer
- America's Cutest Pet (2012)- Executive Producer
- America's Cutest Cat (2011)- Executive Producer
- Dogs 101 (2011)- Executive Producer
- America's Cutest Dog (2011)- Executive Producer
- America's Cutest Dog (2010)- Executive Producer
- Dogs vs. Cats (2010)- Executive Producer
- Magnificent Voyage of Christopher Columbus (2008)- Voice
- Build it Bigger (2007)- Executive Producer
- Red, White & New (2013)- Executive Producer

== Honors and awards ==
For his play The Song of Jacob Zulu, he was nominated for 6 Tony Nominations and he was awarded 2 Tony Awards in two categories, as the author of the play and as lyricist for the award for best score of a musical.

== See also ==
- Independent Lens: "Filmmaker Bios", accessed Dec. 29, 2009
