= Jango (website) =

American free online music streaming service

- Website type: Music streaming service
- Available in: English, Spanish
- Creators: Daniel Kaufman, Chris Dowhan, Mattias Stanghed, Johan Sandstrom, Josh Engroff, Matt Knox, Steve Eddy
- Website: jango.com
- Commercial: Yes
- Launched: November 2007
- Current status: Online

Jango is an American free online music streaming service for personalized radio stations. The service is available worldwide and offers 30 million songs.

== History ==
Based in New York City, Jango was launched in November 2007 by Daniel Kaufman, Chris Dowhan, and Giancarlo Delmo who were previously the founders of Dash.com.

In 2007, Jango became the first music streaming platform to introduce a social networking aspect to playlists. Users were able to share their playlists or listen to playlists created by others. This has been removed since then.

In 2009, the site sold guaranteed plays to independent artists which would be featured alongside similar artists through Jango Airplay. Any song receiving 50 upvotes from the listeners would get pushed into the regular playlist rotation at no extra cost.

Jango Airplay has since been rebranded as RadioAirplay. It now only sells a subscription service which guarantees a specific amount of plays on Jango each tier.

== Features ==
The service recommends its users various personalized radio stations mainly based on the artist, genre, mood or activity. Users are able to skip, like and ban songs without restriction. The variety of artists can be adjusted for each playlist.

In addition, users are also able to create playlists.

The service can be accessed either through a web browser or with its mobile app.

== See also ==
- List of online music databases
- List of social networking websites
- List of Internet radio stations
