= Anna Karenina (musical) =

1992 musical

- 1992 Broadway Playbill
- Music: Daniel Levine
- Lyrics: Peter Kellogg
- Book: Peter Kellogg
- Basis: Leo Tolstoy novel Anna Karenina
- Productions: 1992 Broadway

Anna Karenina is a 1992 musical with a book and lyrics by Peter Kellogg and music by Daniel Levine.

Based on the classic 1877 Leo Tolstoy novel of the same name, it focuses on the tragic title character, a fashionable but unhappily married woman, and her ill-fated liaison with Count Vronsky, which ultimately leads to her downfall.

== Synopsis ==
In 1870s Russia, Anna Karenina is a virtuous woman married to a government official 15 years older than she. Anna falls in love with the handsome and charming Count Alexei Vronsky, but she is torn by her loyalty to her husband and small son.

Meanwhile, Vronsky had first courted Ekaterina "Kitty" Alexandrovna Shcherbatsky, who chose him over gentleman farmer Konstantin Dmitrievich Levin. When Vronsky falls in love with Anna instead, Kitty becomes ill, and Levin, heartsick, withdraws to his country estate. Kitty and Levin finally declare their love for each other.

Anna's choice of love over duty leads to tragedy: Her affair with Vronsky is revealed, and she is shunned; eventually, she throws herself in front of an oncoming train.

== Original cast and characters ==
| Character | Broadway (1992) |
|---|---|
| Anna Karenina | Ann Crumb |
| Konstantin Levin | Gregg Edelman |
| Alexei Karenin | John Cunningham |
| Kitty Alexandrovna | Melissa Errico |
| Stiva Arkadyevich | Jerry Lanning |
| Alexis Vronsky | Scott Wentworth |
| Seryozha Karenin | Erik Houston Saari |
| Korunsky | Gabriel Barre |
| Annushka | Darcy Pulliam |

== Musical numbers ==
Act I

Prologue: St. Petersburg Train Station

- On a Train – Anna, Vronsky, Levin, Chorus

Scene 1: Moscow train station, next morning

- There's More to Life Than Love – Stiva and Anna

Scene 2: – Kitty Scherbatsky's house, later the same day

- How Awful – Kitty
- Would You? – Levin
- In a Room – Levin, Kitty, Anna, Vronsky

Scene 3: A ball, a few days later

- Waltza and Mazurka – Anna, Kitty, Vronsky, Stiva, Chorus

Scene 4: A small station between Moscow and St. Petersburg, the next night Scene 5: Anna's house in St. Petersburg

- Nothing Has Changed – Anna

Scene 6: Prince Tversky's home, that night

- Lowlands – Basso

Scene 7: Croquet Lawn, several weeks later

- Rumors – Chorus

Scene 8: Kitty's house

- How Many Men? – Kitty

Scene 9: A small dance in St. Petersburg

- We Were Dancing – Vronsky

Scene 10: On the way home

- I'm Lost – Anna

Scene 11: Anna's house

- Karenin's List – Karenin

Scene 12: Vronsky's apartment

- Waiting for You – Anna and Vronsky

Act II

Scene 1: Anna's house, three months later

- This Can't Go On – Anna, Vronsky, Karenin

Scene 2: Levin's estate and Italy

- Peasant's Idyll – Chorus
- That Will Serve Her Right – Levin

Scene 3: A villa in Rome

- Everything's Fine – Anna and Vronsky

Scene 4: Kitty's house

- Would You (Reprise) – Levin and Kitty

Scene 5: A hotel in Moscow

- Everything's Fine (Reprise) – Anna

Scene 6: Karenin's house

- Only at Night – Karenin

Scene 7: St. Petersburg Train Station

- Finale – Anna and Chorus

A recording of the musical released on August 7, 2007, stars Melissa Errico as Anna, Gregg Edelman as Levin, Brian d'Arcy James as Vronsky, Jeff McCarthy as Karenin, Marc Kudisch as Oblonsky and Kerry Butler as Kitty.

== Broadway production ==
After 18 previews, the Broadway production, directed by Theodore Mann and choreographed by Patricia Birch, and associate choreographer, Jonathan Stuart Cerullo, opened on August 26, 1992, at the Circle in the Square Theatre. In keeping with the theater's small size (by Broadway standards), the staging included a sparse set, an almost bare stage, and only seven members in the orchestra, with orchestrations by Peter Matz.

Anna Karenina was received poorly by the critics. Time deemed it "earnest, intermittently moving but never quite thrilling", and The New York Times was harsher, calling the show a "series of misperceptions and errors in judgment." Other critics believed the musical's approach to be trivial, including Variety, which called the musical "comic-strip Tolstoy".

The musical ran for 46 performances. It received Tony Award nominations for Best Actress in a Musical (Ann Crumb), Best Book of a Musical, Best Score of a Musical, and Best Featured Actor in a Musical (Gregg Edelman), as well as a Drama Desk Award nomination for Lanning.

In 2006, a version of the Dan Levine, Peter Kellogg musical was produced and performed in Japan. The original Japan cast included Maki Ichiro, Yoshio Inoue, Hitomi Harukaze. A two-DVD set with a length of more than three hours of the Japanese language production is available. There is also a CD of the songs sung in Japanese.
