= Tony Award for Best Lighting Design in a Play =

American theatre award for Broadway

- Awarded for: Best Lighting Design in a Play
- Location: New York City
- Presented by: American Theatre Wing The Broadway League
- Currently held by: Jack Knowles for Death of a Salesman (2026)
- Website: TonyAwards.com

This is a list of winners and nominations for the Tony Award for Best Lighting Design in a Play for outstanding Lighting design of a play. The award was first presented in 2005 after the category of Best Lighting Design was divided into Lighting Design in a Play and Lighting Design in a Musical with each genre receiving its own award.

== Winners and nominees ==
indicates the winner

=== 2000s ===
Year	Production	Nominees
2005 (59th)
2005 (59th)	The Pillowman	Brian MacDevitt
2005 (59th)	Doubt	Pat Collins
2005 (59th)	Gem of the Ocean	Donald Holder
2005 (59th)	A Streetcar Named Desire	Donald Holder
2006 (60th)
2006 (60th)	The History Boys	Mark Henderson
2006 (60th)	Awake and Sing!	Christopher Akerlind
2006 (60th)	Faith Healer	Mark Henderson
2006 (60th)	Three Days of Rain	Paul Gallo
2007 (61st)
2007 (61st)	The Coast of Utopia	Natasha Katz, Brian MacDevitt and Kenneth Posner
2007 (61st)	Coram Boy	Paule Constable
2007 (61st)	Inherit the Wind	Brian MacDevitt
2007 (61st)	Journey's End	Jason Taylor
2008 (62nd)
2008 (62nd)	The 39 Steps	Kevin Adams
2008 (62nd)	August: Osage County	Ann G. Wrightson
2008 (62nd)	Les Liaisons Dangereuses	Donald Holder
2008 (62nd)	Macbeth	Howard Harrison
2009 (63rd)
2009 (63rd)	Joe Turner's Come and Gone	Brian MacDevitt
2009 (63rd)	Equus	David Hersey
2009 (63rd)	Mary Stuart	Hugh Vanstone
2009 (63rd)	33 Variations	David Lander

=== 2010s ===
Year	Production	Nominees
2010 (64th)
2010 (64th)	Red	Neil Austin
2010 (64th)	ENRON	Mark Henderson
2010 (64th)	Fences	Brian MacDevitt
2010 (64th)	Hamlet	Neil Austin
2011 (65th)
2011 (65th)	War Horse	Paule Constable
2011 (65th)	Bengal Tiger at the Baghdad Zoo	David Lander
2011 (65th)	Jerusalem	Mimi Jordan Sherin
2011 (65th)	The Merchant of Venice	Kenneth Posner
2012 (66th)
2012 (66th)	Peter and the Starcatcher	Jeff Croiter
2012 (66th)	Death of a Salesman	Brian MacDevitt
2012 (66th)	Other Desert Cities	Kenneth Posner
2012 (66th)	The Road to Mecca	Peter Kaczorowski
2013 (67th)
2013 (67th)	Lucky Guy	Peggy Eisenhauer and Jules Fisher
2013 (67th)	Golden Boy	Donald Holder
2013 (67th)	The Nance	Japhy Weideman
2013 (67th)	The Testament of Mary	Jennifer Tipton
2014 (68th)
2014 (68th)	The Glass Menagerie	Natasha Katz
2014 (68th)	The Cripple of Inishmaan	Paule Constable
2014 (68th)	Machinal	Jane Cox
2014 (68th)	Of Mice and Men	Japhy Weideman
2015 (69th)
2015 (69th)	The Curious Incident of the Dog in the Night-Time	Paule Constable
2015 (69th)	Airline Highway	Japhy Weideman
2015 (69th)	Skylight	Natasha Katz
2015 (69th)	Wolf Hall Parts One & Two	Paule Constable and David Plater
2016 (70th)
2016 (70th)	Long Day's Journey into Night	Natasha Katz
2016 (70th)	The Crucible	Jan Versweyveld
2016 (70th)	The Humans	Justin Townsend
2016 (70th)	A View from the Bridge	Jan Versweyveld
2017 (71st)
2017 (71st)	Indecent	Christopher Akerlind
2017 (71st)	A Doll's House, Part 2	Jennifer Tipton
2017 (71st)	Jitney	Jane Cox
2017 (71st)	Oslo	Donald Holder
2018 (72nd)
2018 (72nd)	Harry Potter and the Cursed Child	Neil Austin
2018 (72nd)	Angels in America	Paule Constable
2018 (72nd)	Farinelli and the King	Paul Russell
2018 (72nd)	The Iceman Cometh	Peggy Eisenhauer and Jules Fisher
2018 (72nd)	Junk	Ben Stanton
2019 (73rd)
2019 (73rd)	Ink	Neil Austin
2019 (73rd)	The Ferryman	Peter Mumford
2019 (73rd)	Gary: A Sequel to Titus Andronicus	Jules Fisher and Peggy Eisenhauer
2019 (73rd)	Network	Jan Versweyveld and Tal Yarden
2019 (73rd)	To Kill a Mockingbird	Jennifer Tipton

=== 2020s ===
Year	Production	Nominees
2020 (74th)
2020 (74th)	A Christmas Carol	Hugh Vanstone
2020 (74th)	The Inheritance	Jon Clark
2020 (74th)	Slave Play	Jiyoun Chang
2020 (74th)	A Soldier's Play	Allen Lee Hughes
2020 (74th)	The Sound Inside	Heather Gilbert
2022 (75th)
2022 (75th)	The Lehman Trilogy	Jon Clark
2022 (75th)	for colored girls who have considered suicide / when the rainbow is enuf	Jiyoun Chang
2022 (75th)	Hangmen	Joshua Carr
2022 (75th)	Macbeth	Jane Cox
2022 (75th)	The Skin of Our Teeth	Yi Zhao
2023 (76th)
2023 (76th)	Life of Pi	Tim Lutkin
2023 (76th)	A Christmas Carol	Ben Stanton
2023 (76th)	Death of a Salesman	Jen Schriever
2023 (76th)	A Doll's House	Jon Clark
2023 (76th)	Fat Ham	Bradley King
2023 (76th)	Leopoldstadt	Neil Austin
2023 (76th)	Prima Facie	Natasha Chivers
2024 (77th)
2024 (77th)	Appropriate	Jane Cox
2024 (77th)	An Enemy of the People	Isabella Byrd
2024 (77th)	Grey House	Natasha Katz
2024 (77th)	Prayer for the French Republic	Amith Chandrashaker
2024 (77th)	Stereophonic	Jiyoun Chang
2025 (78th)
2025 (78th)	Stranger Things: The First Shadow	Jon Clark
2025 (78th)	Good Night, and Good Luck	Heather Gilbert and David Bengali
2025 (78th)	The Hills of California	Natasha Chivers
2025 (78th)	John Proctor Is the Villain	Natasha Katz and Hannah Wasileski
2025 (78th)	The Picture of Dorian Gray	Nick Schlieper
2026 (79th)
2026 (79th)	Death of a Salesman	Jack Knowles
2026 (79th)	Bug	Heather Gilbert
2026 (79th)	Dog Day Afternoon	Isabella Byrd
2026 (79th)	The Fear of 13	Heather Gilbert
2026 (79th)	Joe Turner's Come and Gone	Stacey Derosier
2026 (79th)	Oedipus	Natasha Chivers

== Multiple wins ==
3 Wins

- Neil Austin
- Brian MacDevitt
- Natasha Katz

2 Wins

- Jon Clark
- Paule Constable

== Multiple nominations ==
6 nominations

- Brian MacDevitt
- Paule Constable
- Natasha Katz

5 nominations

- Neil Austin
- Donald Holder

4 nominations

- Jon Clark
- Jane Cox
- Heather Gilbert

3 nominations

- Jiyoun Chang
- Natasha Chivers
- Peggy Eisenhauer
- Jules Fisher
- Mark Henderson
- Kenneth Posner
- Ben Stanton
- Jennifer Tipton
- Japhy Weideman
- Jan Versweyveld

2 nominations

- Christopher Akerlind
- Isabella Byrd
- David Lander
- Hugh Vanstone

== See also ==
- Tony Award for Best Lighting Design in a Musical
- Drama Desk Award for Outstanding Lighting Design
- Laurence Olivier Award for Best Lighting Design
- List of Tony Award-nominated productions
