= Drama Desk Award for Outstanding Lighting Design of a Musical =

American theatre award

- Awarded for: Outstanding Lighting Design for a Musical
- Location: New York City
- Country: United States
- Presented by: Drama Desk
- First award: 2009
- Currently held by: Jen Schriever and Michael Arden, The Lost Boys (2026)
- Website: dramadesk.org (defunct)

The Drama Desk Award for Outstanding Lighting Design of a Musical is an annual award presented by Drama Desk in recognition of achievements in theatre across collective Broadway, off-Broadway and off-off-Broadway productions in New York City.

The award was established in 1975, with the Drama Desk Award for Outstanding Lighting Design being presented each year to any play or musical production. For 2009, the singular award was replaced by separate play and musical categories, but then merged again from 2010 to 2015; the separate play and musical categories have again co-existed since 2016.

== Winners and nominees ==
Key

and bold indicates the winner.

=== 2000s ===
Year	Designer	Production	Ref.
2009
2009	**Rick Fisher**	**Billy Elliot the Musical**	
2009	Kevin Adams	Hair	
2009	Jules Fisher and Kenneth Posner	9 to 5	
2009	Jason Lyons	Clay	
2009	Sinéad McKenna	Improbable Frequency	
2009	Richard Pilbrow	A Tale of Two Cities	

=== 2010s ===
Year	Designer	Production	Ref.
2010-2015	N/A		
2016	**Justin Townsend**	**American Psycho**	
2016	Jane Cox	The Color Purple	
2016	Jake DeGroot	SeaWife	
2016	Jules Fisher and Peggy Eisenhauer	Shuffle Along	
2016	Ben Stanton	Spring Awakening	
2017
2017	**Bradley King**	**Natasha, Pierre & The Great Comet of 1812**	
2017	Jeff Croiter	Bandstand	
2017	Mark Henderson	Sunset Boulevard	
2017	Bradley King	Hadestown	
2017	Amy Mae	Sweeney Todd: The Demon Barber of Fleet Street	
2017	Malcolm Rippeth	946: The Amazing Story of Adolphus Tips	
2018
2018	**Jules Fisher and Peggy Eisenhauer**	**Once on This Island**	
2018	Louisa Adamson and Christian Barry	Old Stock: A Refugee Love Story	
2018	Amith Chandrashaker	The Lucky Ones	
2018	Brian MacDevitt	Carousel	
2018	Jeanette Oi-Suk Yew	KPOP	
2019
2019	**Bradley King**	**Hadestown**	
2019	Adam Honoré	Carmen Jones	
2019	Jamie Roderick	Midnight at the Never Get	
2019	Barbara Samuels	Rags Parkland Sings the Songs of the Future	
2019	Scott Zielinski	Rodgers & Hammerstein's Oklahoma!	

=== 2020s ===
Year	Designer	Production	Ref.
2020
2020	**Justin Townsend**	**Moulin Rouge!**	
2020	Betsy Adams	The Wrong Man	
2020	Jane Cox	The Secret Life of Bees	
2020	Herrick Goldman	Einstein's Dreams	
2020	Bruno Poet	Tina: The Tina Turner Musical	
2021	No awards: New York theatres shuttered, March 2020 to September 2021, due to the COVID-19 pandemic in New York City		
2022
2022	**Natasha Katz**	**MJ**	
2022	**Bradley King**	**Flying Over Sunset**	
2022	Natasha Katz	Diana	
2022	Jennifer Tipton	Intimate Apparel	
2023	**Natasha Katz**	**Sweeney Todd: The Demon Barber of Fleet Street**	
2023	Ken Billington	New York, New York	
2023	Jeff Croiter	Only Gold	
2023	Heather Gilbert	Parade	
2023	David Grill	Bob Fosse's Dancin'	
2024	**Brian MacDevitt and Hana S. Kim**	**The Outsiders**	
2024	Lap Chi Chu	Suffs	
2024	Heather Gilbert	Dead Outlaw	
2024	Bradley King	Water for Elephants	
2024	Jeanette Oi-Suk Yew	The Connector	
2025
2025	**Jack Knowles**	**Sunset Blvd.**	
2025	Kevin Adams	Swept Away	
2025	Adam Honoré	Cats: The Jellicle Ball	
2025	Philip S. Rosenberg	Boop! The Musical	
2025	Scott Zielinski and Ruey Horng Sun	Floyd Collins	
2026
2026	**Jen Shriever and Michael Arden**	**The Lost Boys**	
2026	Adam Honoré	Amahl and the Night Visitors	
2026	Adam Honoré and Donald Holder	Ragtime	
2026	Bradley King	The Baker's Wife	
2026	Mextly Couzin	Mexodus	
2026	Japhy Weideman	Beau the Musical	

== Multiple wins ==
3 wins

- Bradley King

2 wins

- Justin Townsend
- Natasha Katz

== Multiple nominations ==
6 nominations

- Bradley King

4 nominations

- Adam Honoré

3 nominations

- Jules Fisher
- Natasha Katz

2 nominations

- Kevin Adams
- Justin Townsend
- Jane Cox
- Peggy Eisenhauer
- Jeff Croiter
- Brian MacDevitt
- Jeanette Oi-Suk Yew
- Scott Zielinski
- Heather Gilbert

== See also ==
- Laurence Olivier Award for Best Lighting Design
- Tony Award for Best Lighting Design
- Outer Critics Circle Award for Outstanding Lighting Design
- Lucille Lortel Award for Outstanding Lighting Design
