= Tony Award for Best Lighting Design =

American theatre award for Broadway

- Awarded for: Best Lighting Design
- Location: United States New York City
- Presented by: American Theatre Wing The Broadway League
- Currently held by: Jack Knowles for Death of a Salesman (2026)
- Website: TonyAwards.com

This is a list of winners and nominations for the Tony Award for Best Lighting Design for outstanding lighting design of a play or musical. The award was first presented in 1970. Since 2005, the category was divided into Lighting Design in a Play and Lighting Design in a Musical with each genre receiving its own award.

== Winners and nominees ==
indicates the winner

=== 1970s ===
Year	Designer	Production
1970; 24th Tony Awards
1970; 24th Tony Awards	Jo Mielziner	Child's Play
1970; 24th Tony Awards	Tharon Musser	Applause
1970; 24th Tony Awards	Thomas R. Skelton	Indians
1971; 25th Tony Awards
1971; 25th Tony Awards	R.H. Poindexter	Paul Sill's Story Theatre
1971; 25th Tony Awards	Robert Ornbo	Company
1971; 25th Tony Awards	William Ritman	Sleuth
1972; 26th Tony Awards
1972; 26th Tony Awards	Tharon Musser	Follies
1972; 26th Tony Awards	Martin Aronstein	Ain't Supposed To Die a Natural Death
1972; 26th Tony Awards	John Bury	Old Times
1972; 26th Tony Awards	Jules Fisher	Jesus Christ Superstar
1973; 27th Tony Awards
1973; 27th Tony Awards	Jules Fisher	Pippin
1973; 27th Tony Awards	Martin Aronstein	Much Ado About Nothing
1973; 27th Tony Awards	Ian Calderon	That Championship Season
1973; 27th Tony Awards	Tharon Musser	A Little Night Music
1974; 28th Tony Awards
1974; 28th Tony Awards	Jules Fisher	Ulysses in Nighttown
1974; 28th Tony Awards	Martin Aronstein	Boom Boom Room
1974; 28th Tony Awards	Ken Billington	The Visit
1974; 28th Tony Awards	Ben Edwards	A Moon for the Misbegotten
1974; 28th Tony Awards	Tharon Musser	The Good Doctor
1975; 29th Tony Awards
1975; 29th Tony Awards	Neil Peter Jampolis	Sherlock Holmes
1975; 29th Tony Awards	Abe Feder	Goodtime Charley
1975; 29th Tony Awards	Chip Monck	The Rocky Horror Show
1975; 29th Tony Awards	Andy Phillips	Equus
1975; 29th Tony Awards	Thomas R. Skelton	All God's Chillun Got Wings
1975; 29th Tony Awards	James Tilton	Seascape
1976; 30th Tony Awards
1976; 30th Tony Awards	Tharon Musser	A Chorus Line
1976; 30th Tony Awards	Ian Calderon	Trelawny of the Wells
1976; 30th Tony Awards	Jules Fisher	Chicago
1976; 30th Tony Awards	Tharon Musser	Pacific Overtures
1977; 31st Tony Awards
1977; 31st Tony Awards	Jennifer Tipton	The Cherry Orchard
1977; 31st Tony Awards	John Bury	No Man's Land
1977; 31st Tony Awards	Pat Collins	Threepenny Opera
1977; 31st Tony Awards	Neil Peter Jampolis	The Innocents
1978; 32nd Tony Awards
1978; 32nd Tony Awards	Jules Fisher	Dancin'
1978; 32nd Tony Awards	Ken Billington	Working
1978; 32nd Tony Awards	Jules Fisher	Beatlemania
1978; 32nd Tony Awards	Tharon Musser	The Act
1979; 33rd Tony Awards
1979; 33rd Tony Awards	Roger Morgan	The Crucifer of Blood
1979; 33rd Tony Awards	Ken Billington	Sweeney Todd: The Demon Barber of Fleet Street
1979; 33rd Tony Awards	Beverly Emmons	The Elephant Man
1979; 33rd Tony Awards	Tharon Musser	Ballroom

=== 1980s ===
Year	Designer	Production
1980; 34th Tony Awards
1980; 34th Tony Awards	David Hersey	Evita
1980; 34th Tony Awards	Beverly Emmons	A Day in Hollywood/A Night in the Ukraine
1980; 34th Tony Awards	Craig Miller	Barnum
1980; 34th Tony Awards	Dennis Parichy	Talley's Folly
1981; 35th Tony Awards
1981; 35th Tony Awards	John Bury	Amadeus
1981; 35th Tony Awards	Tharon Musser	42nd Street
1981; 35th Tony Awards	Dennis Parichy	Fifth of July
1981; 35th Tony Awards	Jennifer Tipton	Sophisticated Ladies
1982; 36th Tony Awards
1982; 36th Tony Awards	Tharon Musser	Dreamgirls
1982; 36th Tony Awards	Martin Aronstein	Medea
1982; 36th Tony Awards	David Hersey	The Life and Adventures of Nicholas Nickleby
1982; 36th Tony Awards	Marcia Madeira	Nine
1983; 37th Tony Awards
1983; 37th Tony Awards	David Hersey	Cats
1983; 37th Tony Awards	Ken Billington	Foxfire
1983; 37th Tony Awards	Robert Bryan	All's Well That Ends Well
1983; 37th Tony Awards	Allen Lee Hughes	K2
1984; 38th Tony Awards
1984; 38th Tony Awards	Richard Nelson	Sunday in the Park with George
1984; 38th Tony Awards	Ken Billington	End of the World
1984; 38th Tony Awards	Jules Fisher	La Cage aux Folles
1984; 38th Tony Awards	Marc B. Weiss	A Moon for the Misbegotten
1985; 39th Tony Awards
1985; 39th Tony Awards	Richard Riddell	Big River
1985; 39th Tony Awards	Terry Hands	Cyrano de Bergerac
1985; 39th Tony Awards	Terry Hands	Much Ado About Nothing
1985; 39th Tony Awards	Allen Lee Hughes	Strange Interlude
1986; 40th Tony Awards
1986; 40th Tony Awards	Pat Collins	I'm Not Rappaport
1986; 40th Tony Awards	Jules Fisher	Song and Dance
1986; 40th Tony Awards	Paul Gallo	The House of Blue Leaves
1986; 40th Tony Awards	Thomas R. Skelton	The Iceman Cometh
1987; 41st Tony Awards
1987; 41st Tony Awards	David Hersey	Les Misérables
1987; 41st Tony Awards	Martin Aronstein	Wild Honey
1987; 41st Tony Awards	Beverly Emmons and Chris Parry	Les Liaisons Dangereuses
1987; 41st Tony Awards	David Hersey	Starlight Express
1988; 42nd Tony Awards
1988; 42nd Tony Awards	Andrew Bridge	The Phantom of the Opera
1988; 42nd Tony Awards	Paul Gallo	Anything Goes
1988; 42nd Tony Awards	Richard Nelson	Into the Woods
1988; 42nd Tony Awards	Andy Phillips	M. Butterfly
1989; 43rd Tony Awards
1989; 43rd Tony Awards	Jennifer Tipton	Jerome Robbins' Broadway
1989; 43rd Tony Awards	Neil Peter Jampolis and Jane Reisman	Black and Blue
1989; 43rd Tony Awards	Brian Nason	Metamorphoses
1989; 43rd Tony Awards	Nancy Schertler	Largely New York

=== 1990s ===
Year	Designer	Production
1990; 44th Tony Awards
1990; 44th Tony Awards	Jules Fisher	Grand Hotel
1990; 44th Tony Awards	Paul Gallo	City of Angels
1990; 44th Tony Awards	Neil Peter Jampolis and Paul Pyant	Orpheus Descending
1990; 44th Tony Awards	Kevin Rigdon	The Grapes of Wrath
1991; 45th Tony Awards
1991; 45th Tony Awards	Jules Fisher	The Will Rogers Follies
1991; 45th Tony Awards	David Hersey	Miss Saigon
1991; 45th Tony Awards	Allen Lee Hughes	Once on This Island
1991; 45th Tony Awards	Jennifer Tipton	La Bête
1992; 46th Tony Awards
1992; 46th Tony Awards	Jules Fisher	Jelly's Last Jam
1992; 46th Tony Awards	Paul Gallo	Crazy for You
1992; 46th Tony Awards	Paul Gallo	Guys and Dolls
1992; 46th Tony Awards	Richard Pilbrow	Four Baboons Adoring the Sun
1993; 47th Tony Awards
1993; 47th Tony Awards	Chris Parry	The Who's Tommy
1993; 47th Tony Awards	Howell Binkley	Kiss of the Spider Woman
1993; 47th Tony Awards	Jules Fisher	Angels in America: Millennium Approaches
1993; 47th Tony Awards	Dennis Parichy	Redwood Curtain
1994; 48th Tony Awards
1994; 48th Tony Awards	Rick Fisher	An Inspector Calls
1994; 48th Tony Awards	Beverly Emmons	Passion
1994; 48th Tony Awards	Jules Fisher	Angels in America: Perestroika
1994; 48th Tony Awards	Natasha Katz	Beauty and the Beast
1995; 49th Tony Awards
1995; 49th Tony Awards	Andrew Bridge	Sunset Boulevard
1995; 49th Tony Awards	Beverly Emmons	The Heiress
1995; 49th Tony Awards	Mark Henderson	Indiscretions
1995; 49th Tony Awards	Paul Pyant	Arcadia
1996; 50th Tony Awards
1996; 50th Tony Awards	Peggy Eisenhauer and Jules Fisher	Bring in 'da Noise/Bring in 'da Funk
1996; 50th Tony Awards	Christopher Akerlind	Seven Guitars
1996; 50th Tony Awards	Blake Burba	Rent
1996; 50th Tony Awards	Nigel Levings	The King and I
1997; 51st Tony Awards
1997; 51st Tony Awards	Ken Billington	Chicago
1997; 51st Tony Awards	Beverly Emmons	Jekyll and Hyde
1997; 51st Tony Awards	Donald Holder	Juan Darién
1997; 51st Tony Awards	Richard Pilbrow	The Life
1998; 52nd Tony Awards
1998; 52nd Tony Awards	Donald Holder	The Lion King
1998; 52nd Tony Awards	Paul Anderson	The Chairs
1998; 52nd Tony Awards	Mike Baldassari and Peggy Eisenhauer	Cabaret
1998; 52nd Tony Awards	Peggy Eisenhauer and Jules Fisher	Ragtime
1999; 53rd Tony Awards
1999; 53rd Tony Awards	Andrew Bridge	Fosse
1999; 53rd Tony Awards	Mark Henderson	The Iceman Cometh
1999; 53rd Tony Awards	Natasha Katz	Twelfth Night
1999; 53rd Tony Awards	Chris Parry	Not About Nightingales

=== 2000s ===
Year	Award Type	Designer	Production
2000; 54th Tony Awards
2000; 54th Tony Awards	Best Lighting Design	Natasha Katz	Aida
2000; 54th Tony Awards	Best Lighting Design	Peggy Eisenhauer and Jules Fisher	Marie Christine
2000; 54th Tony Awards	Best Lighting Design	Peggy Eisenhauer and Jules Fisher	The Wild Party
2000; 54th Tony Awards	Best Lighting Design	Peter Kaczorowski	Kiss Me, Kate
2001; 55th Tony Awards	Best Lighting Design		
2001; 55th Tony Awards	Best Lighting Design	Peter Kaczorowski	The Producers
2001; 55th Tony Awards	Best Lighting Design	Peggy Eisenhauer and Jules Fisher	Jane Eyre
2001; 55th Tony Awards	Best Lighting Design	Paul Gallo	42nd Street
2001; 55th Tony Awards	Best Lighting Design	Kenneth Posner	The Adventures of Tom Sawyer
2002; 56th Tony Awards	Best Lighting Design		
2002; 56th Tony Awards	Best Lighting Design	Brian MacDevitt	Into the Woods
2002; 56th Tony Awards	Best Lighting Design	David Hersey	Oklahoma!
2002; 56th Tony Awards	Best Lighting Design	Natasha Katz	Sweet Smell of Success
2002; 56th Tony Awards	Best Lighting Design	Paul Gallo	The Crucible
2003; 57th Tony Awards	Best Lighting Design		
2003; 57th Tony Awards	Best Lighting Design	Nigel Levings	La bohème
2003; 57th Tony Awards	Best Lighting Design	Donald Holder	Movin' Out
2003; 57th Tony Awards	Best Lighting Design	Brian MacDevitt	Nine
2003; 57th Tony Awards	Best Lighting Design	Kenneth Posner	Hairspray
2004; 58th Tony Awards	Best Lighting Design		
2004; 58th Tony Awards	Best Lighting Design	Peggy Eisenhauer and Jules Fisher	Assassins
2004; 58th Tony Awards	Best Lighting Design	Brian MacDevitt	Fiddler on the Roof
2004; 58th Tony Awards	Best Lighting Design	Brian MacDevitt	Henry IV, Part 1 and Part 2
2004; 58th Tony Awards	Best Lighting Design	Kenneth Posner	Wicked
2005; 59th Tony Awards	Best Lighting Design		
2005; 59th Tony Awards	Best Lighting Design for a Play	Brian MacDevitt	The Pillowman
2005; 59th Tony Awards	Best Lighting Design for a Play	Pat Collins	Doubt: A Parable
2005; 59th Tony Awards	Best Lighting Design for a Play	Donald Holder	A Streetcar Named Desire
2005; 59th Tony Awards	Best Lighting Design for a Play	Donald Holder	Gem of the Ocean
2005; 59th Tony Awards	Best Lighting Design for a Musical	Christopher Akerlind	The Light in the Piazza
2005; 59th Tony Awards	Best Lighting Design for a Musical	Mark Henderson	Chitty Chitty Bang Bang
2005; 59th Tony Awards	Best Lighting Design for a Musical	Kenneth Posner	Dirty Rotten Scoundrels
2005; 59th Tony Awards	Best Lighting Design for a Musical	Hugh Vanstone	Monty Python's Spamalot
2006; 60th Tony Awards
2006; 60th Tony Awards	Best Lighting Design for a Play	Mark Henderson	The History Boys
2006; 60th Tony Awards	Best Lighting Design for a Play	Christopher Akerlind	Awake and Sing!
2006; 60th Tony Awards	Best Lighting Design for a Play	Paul Gallo	Three Days of Rain
2006; 60th Tony Awards	Best Lighting Design for a Play	Mark Henderson	Faith Healer
2006; 60th Tony Awards	Best Lighting Design for a Musical	Howell Binkley	Jersey Boys
2006; 60th Tony Awards	Best Lighting Design for a Musical	Ken Billington and Brian Monahan	The Drowsy Chaperone
2006; 60th Tony Awards	Best Lighting Design for a Musical	Natasha Katz	Tarzan
2006; 60th Tony Awards	Best Lighting Design for a Musical	Brian MacDevitt	The Color Purple
2007; 61st Tony Awards
2007; 61st Tony Awards	Best Lighting Design for a Play	Natasha Katz, Brian MacDevitt and Kenneth Posner	The Coast of Utopia
2007; 61st Tony Awards	Best Lighting Design for a Play	Paule Constable	Coram Boy
2007; 61st Tony Awards	Best Lighting Design for a Play	Brian MacDevitt	Inherit the Wind
2007; 61st Tony Awards	Best Lighting Design for a Play	Jason Taylor	Journey's End
2007; 61st Tony Awards	Best Lighting Design for a Musical	Kevin Adams	Spring Awakening
2007; 61st Tony Awards	Best Lighting Design for a Musical	Christopher Akerlind	110 in the Shade
2007; 61st Tony Awards	Best Lighting Design for a Musical	Howard Harrison	Mary Poppins
2007; 61st Tony Awards	Best Lighting Design for a Musical	Peter Kaczorowski	Grey Gardens
2008; 62nd Tony Awards
2008; 62nd Tony Awards	Best Lighting Design for a Play	Kevin Adams	The 39 Steps
2008; 62nd Tony Awards	Best Lighting Design for a Play	Howard Harrison	Macbeth
2008; 62nd Tony Awards	Best Lighting Design for a Play	Donald Holder	Les Liaisons Dangereuses
2008; 62nd Tony Awards	Best Lighting Design for a Play	Ann G. Wrightson	August: Osage County
2008; 62nd Tony Awards	Best Lighting Design for a Musical	Donald Holder	South Pacific
2008; 62nd Tony Awards	Best Lighting Design for a Musical	Ken Billington	Sunday in the Park with George
2008; 62nd Tony Awards	Best Lighting Design for a Musical	Howell Binkley	In the Heights
2008; 62nd Tony Awards	Best Lighting Design for a Musical	Natasha Katz	The Little Mermaid
2009; 63rd Tony Awards
2009; 63rd Tony Awards	Best Lighting Design for a Play	Brian MacDevitt	Joe Turner's Come and Gone
2009; 63rd Tony Awards	Best Lighting Design for a Play	David Hersey	Equus
2009; 63rd Tony Awards	Best Lighting Design for a Play	David Lander	33 Variations
2009; 63rd Tony Awards	Best Lighting Design for a Play	Hugh Vanstone	Mary Stuart
2009; 63rd Tony Awards	Best Lighting Design for a Musical	Rick Fisher	Billy Elliot the Musical
2009; 63rd Tony Awards	Best Lighting Design for a Musical	Kevin Adams	Hair
2009; 63rd Tony Awards	Best Lighting Design for a Musical	Kevin Adams	Next to Normal
2009; 63rd Tony Awards	Best Lighting Design for a Musical	Howell Binkley	West Side Story

=== 2010s ===
Year	Award Type	Designer	Production
2010; 64th Tony Awards
2010; 64th Tony Awards	Best Lighting Design for a Play	Neil Austin	Red
2010; 64th Tony Awards	Best Lighting Design for a Play	Neil Austin	Hamlet
2010; 64th Tony Awards	Best Lighting Design for a Play	Mark Henderson	ENRON
2010; 64th Tony Awards	Best Lighting Design for a Play	Brian MacDevitt	Fences
2010; 64th Tony Awards	Best Lighting Design for a Musical	Kevin Adams	American Idiot
2010; 64th Tony Awards	Best Lighting Design for a Musical	Donald Holder	Ragtime
2010; 64th Tony Awards	Best Lighting Design for a Musical	Nick Richings	La Cage aux Folles
2010; 64th Tony Awards	Best Lighting Design for a Musical	Robert Wierzel	Fela!
2011; 65th Tony Awards
2011; 65th Tony Awards	Best Lighting Design for a Play	Paule Constable	War Horse
2011; 65th Tony Awards	Best Lighting Design for a Play	David Lander	Bengal Tiger at the Baghdad Zoo
2011; 65th Tony Awards	Best Lighting Design for a Play	Kenneth Posner	The Merchant of Venice
2011; 65th Tony Awards	Best Lighting Design for a Play	Mimi Jordan Sherin	Jerusalem
2011; 65th Tony Awards	Lighting Design for a Musical	Brian MacDevitt	The Book of Mormon
2011; 65th Tony Awards	Lighting Design for a Musical	Ken Billington	The Scottsboro Boys
2011; 65th Tony Awards	Lighting Design for a Musical	Howell Binkley	How to Succeed in Business Without Really Trying
2011; 65th Tony Awards	Lighting Design for a Musical	Peter Kaczorowski	Anything Goes
2012; 66th Tony Awards
2012; 66th Tony Awards	Lighting Design for a Play	Jeff Croiter	Peter and the Starcatcher
2012; 66th Tony Awards	Lighting Design for a Play	Peter Kaczorowski	The Road to Mecca
2012; 66th Tony Awards	Lighting Design for a Play	Brian MacDevitt	Death of a Salesman
2012; 66th Tony Awards	Lighting Design for a Play	Kenneth Posner	Other Desert Cities
2012; 66th Tony Awards	Lighting Design for a Musical	Natasha Katz	Once
2012; 66th Tony Awards	Lighting Design for a Musical	Christopher Akerlind	Porgy and Bess
2012; 66th Tony Awards	Lighting Design for a Musical	Natasha Katz	Follies
2012; 66th Tony Awards	Lighting Design for a Musical	Hugh Vanstone	Ghost the Musical
2013; 67th Tony Awards
2013; 67th Tony Awards	Lighting Design for a Play	Peggy Eisenhauer and Jules Fisher	Lucky Guy
2013; 67th Tony Awards	Lighting Design for a Play	Donald Holder	Golden Boy
2013; 67th Tony Awards	Lighting Design for a Play	Jennifer Tipton	The Testament of Mary
2013; 67th Tony Awards	Lighting Design for a Play	Japhy Weideman	The Nance
2013; 67th Tony Awards	Lighting Design for a Musical	Hugh Vanstone	Matilda the Musical
2013; 67th Tony Awards	Lighting Design for a Musical	Kenneth Posner	Kinky Boots
2013; 67th Tony Awards	Lighting Design for a Musical	Kenneth Posner	Pippin
2013; 67th Tony Awards	Lighting Design for a Musical	Kenneth Posner	Rodgers + Hammerstein's Cinderella
2014; 68th Tony Awards
2014; 68th Tony Awards	Lighting Design for a Play	Natasha Katz	The Glass Menagerie
2014; 68th Tony Awards	Lighting Design for a Play	Paule Constable	The Cripple of Inishmaan
2014; 68th Tony Awards	Lighting Design for a Play	Jane Cox	Machinal
2014; 68th Tony Awards	Lighting Design for a Play	Japhy Weideman	Of Mice and Men
2014; 68th Tony Awards	Lighting Design for a Musical	Kevin Adams	Hedwig and the Angry Inch
2014; 68th Tony Awards	Lighting Design for a Musical	Christopher Akerlind	Rocky the Musical
2014; 68th Tony Awards	Lighting Design for a Musical	Howell Binkley	After Midnight
2014; 68th Tony Awards	Lighting Design for a Musical	Donald Holder	The Bridges of Madison County
2015; 69th Tony Awards
2015; 69th Tony Awards	Lighting Design for a Play	Paule Constable	The Curious Incident of the Dog in the Night-Time
2015; 69th Tony Awards	Lighting Design for a Play	Paule Constable and David Plater	Wolf Hall Parts One & Two
2015; 69th Tony Awards	Lighting Design for a Play	Natasha Katz	Skylight
2015; 69th Tony Awards	Lighting Design for a Play	Japhy Weideman	Airline Highway
2015; 69th Tony Awards	Lighting Design for a Musical	Natasha Katz	An American in Paris
2015; 69th Tony Awards	Lighting Design for a Musical	Donald Holder	The King and I
2015; 69th Tony Awards	Lighting Design for a Musical	Ben Stanton	Fun Home
2015; 69th Tony Awards	Lighting Design for a Musical	Japhy Weideman	The Visit
2016; 70th Tony Awards
2016; 70th Tony Awards	Lighting Design for a Play	Natasha Katz	Long Day's Journey into Night
2016; 70th Tony Awards	Lighting Design for a Play	Justin Townsend	The Humans
2016; 70th Tony Awards	Lighting Design for a Play	Jan Versweyveld	A View from the Bridge
2016; 70th Tony Awards	Lighting Design for a Play	Jan Versweyveld	The Crucible
2016; 70th Tony Awards	Lighting Design for a Musical	Howell Binkley	Hamilton
2016; 70th Tony Awards	Lighting Design for a Musical	Peggy Eisenhauer and Jules Fisher	Shuffle Along
2016; 70th Tony Awards	Lighting Design for a Musical	Ben Stanton	Spring Awakening
2016; 70th Tony Awards	Lighting Design for a Musical	Justin Townsend	American Psycho
2017; 71st Tony Awards
2017; 71st Tony Awards	Lighting Design for a Play	Christopher Akerlind	Indecent
2017; 71st Tony Awards	Lighting Design for a Play	Jane Cox	Jitney
2017; 71st Tony Awards	Lighting Design for a Play	Donald Holder	Oslo
2017; 71st Tony Awards	Lighting Design for a Play	Jennifer Tipton	A Doll's House, Part 2
2017; 71st Tony Awards	Lighting Design for a Musical	Bradley King	Natasha, Pierre & The Great Comet of 1812
2017; 71st Tony Awards	Lighting Design for a Musical	Howell Binkley	Come from Away
2017; 71st Tony Awards	Lighting Design for a Musical	Natasha Katz	Hello, Dolly!
2017; 71st Tony Awards	Lighting Design for a Musical	Japhy Weideman	Dear Evan Hansen
2018; 72nd Tony Awards
2018; 72nd Tony Awards	Lighting Design for a Play	Neil Austin	Harry Potter and the Cursed Child
2018; 72nd Tony Awards	Lighting Design for a Play	Paule Constable	Angels in America
2018; 72nd Tony Awards	Lighting Design for a Play	Peggy Eisenhauer and Jules Fisher	The Iceman Cometh
2018; 72nd Tony Awards	Lighting Design for a Play	Paul Russell	Farinelli and the King
2018; 72nd Tony Awards	Lighting Design for a Play	Ben Stanton	Junk
2018; 72nd Tony Awards	Lighting Design for a Musical	Tyler Micoleau	The Band's Visit
2018; 72nd Tony Awards	Lighting Design for a Musical	Kevin Adams	SpongeBob SquarePants
2018; 72nd Tony Awards	Lighting Design for a Musical	Peggy Eisenhauer and Jules Fisher	Once on This Island
2018; 72nd Tony Awards	Lighting Design for a Musical	Donald Holder	My Fair Lady
2018; 72nd Tony Awards	Lighting Design for a Musical	Brian MacDevitt	Carousel
2019; 73rd Tony Awards
2019; 73rd Tony Awards	Lighting Design for a Play	Neil Austin	Ink
2019; 73rd Tony Awards	Lighting Design for a Play	Jules Fisher and Peggy Eisenhauer	Gary: A Sequel to Titus Andronicus
2019; 73rd Tony Awards	Lighting Design for a Play	Peter Mumford	The Ferryman
2019; 73rd Tony Awards	Lighting Design for a Play	Jennifer Tipton	To Kill a Mockingbird
2019; 73rd Tony Awards	Lighting Design for a Play	Jan Versweyveld and Tal Yarden	Network
2019; 73rd Tony Awards	Lighting Design for a Musical	Bradley King	Hadestown
2019; 73rd Tony Awards	Lighting Design for a Musical	Kevin Adams	The Cher Show
2019; 73rd Tony Awards	Lighting Design for a Musical	Howell Binkley	Ain’t Too Proud
2019; 73rd Tony Awards	Lighting Design for a Musical	Peter Mumford	King Kong
2019; 73rd Tony Awards	Lighting Design for a Musical	Kenneth Posner and Peter Nigrini	Beetlejuice

=== 2020s ===
Year	Award Type	Designer	Production
2021; 74th Tony Awards
2021; 74th Tony Awards	Best Lighting Design for a Play	Hugh Vanstone	A Christmas Carol
2021; 74th Tony Awards	Best Lighting Design for a Play	Jiyoun Chang	Slave Play
2021; 74th Tony Awards	Best Lighting Design for a Play	Jon Clark	The Inheritance
2021; 74th Tony Awards	Best Lighting Design for a Play	Heather Gilbert	The Sound Inside
2021; 74th Tony Awards	Best Lighting Design for a Play	Allen Lee Hughes	A Soldier's Play
2021; 74th Tony Awards	Best Lighting Design for a Musical	Justin Townsend	Moulin Rouge!
2021; 74th Tony Awards	Best Lighting Design for a Musical	Bruno Poet	Tina
2021; 74th Tony Awards	Best Lighting Design for a Musical	Justin Townsend	Jagged Little Pill
2022; 75th Tony Awards
2022; 75th Tony Awards	Best Lighting Design for a Play	Jon Clark	The Lehman Trilogy
2022; 75th Tony Awards	Best Lighting Design for a Play	Joshua Carr	Hangmen
2022; 75th Tony Awards	Best Lighting Design for a Play	Jiyoun Chang	For Colored Girls Who Have Considered Suicide / When the Rainbow Is Enuf
2022; 75th Tony Awards	Best Lighting Design for a Play	Jane Cox	Macbeth
2022; 75th Tony Awards	Best Lighting Design for a Play	Yi Zhao	The Skin of Our Teeth
2022; 75th Tony Awards	Best Lighting Design for a Musical	Natasha Katz	MJ the Musical
2022; 75th Tony Awards	Best Lighting Design for a Musical	Neil Austin	Company
2022; 75th Tony Awards	Best Lighting Design for a Musical	Tim Deiling	Six
2022; 75th Tony Awards	Best Lighting Design for a Musical	Donald Holder	Paradise Square
2022; 75th Tony Awards	Best Lighting Design for a Musical	Bradley King	Flying Over Sunset
2022; 75th Tony Awards	Best Lighting Design for a Musical	Jen Schriever	A Strange Loop
2023; 76th Tony Awards	Best Lighting Design for a Play		
2023; 76th Tony Awards	Best Lighting Design for a Play	Tim Lutkin	Life of Pi
2023; 76th Tony Awards	Best Lighting Design for a Play	Ben Stanton	A Christmas Carol
2023; 76th Tony Awards	Best Lighting Design for a Play	Jen Schriever	Death of a Salesman
2023; 76th Tony Awards	Best Lighting Design for a Play	Jon Clark	A Doll's House
2023; 76th Tony Awards	Best Lighting Design for a Play	Bradley King	Fat Ham
2023; 76th Tony Awards	Best Lighting Design for a Play	Neil Austin	Leopoldstadt
2023; 76th Tony Awards	Best Lighting Design for a Play	Natasha Chivers	Prima Facie
2023; 76th Tony Awards	Best Lighting Design for a Musical	Natasha Katz	Some Like It Hot
2023; 76th Tony Awards	Best Lighting Design for a Musical	Natasha Katz	Sweeney Todd: The Demon Barber of Fleet Street
2023; 76th Tony Awards	Best Lighting Design for a Musical	Howard Hudson	& Juliet
2023; 76th Tony Awards	Best Lighting Design for a Musical	Lap Chi Chu	Lerner & Loewe's Camelot
2023; 76th Tony Awards	Best Lighting Design for a Musical	Ken Billington	New York, New York
2023; 76th Tony Awards	Best Lighting Design for a Musical	Heather Gilbert	Parade
2024; 77th Tony Awards	Best Lighting Design for a Play		
2024; 77th Tony Awards	Best Lighting Design for a Play	Jane Cox	Appropriate
2024; 77th Tony Awards	Best Lighting Design for a Play	Isabella Byrd	An Enemy of the People
2024; 77th Tony Awards	Best Lighting Design for a Play	Natasha Katz	Grey House
2024; 77th Tony Awards	Best Lighting Design for a Play	Amith Chandrashaker	Prayer for the French Republic
2024; 77th Tony Awards	Best Lighting Design for a Play	Jiyoun Chang	Stereophonic
2024; 77th Tony Awards	Best Lighting Design for a Musical		
2024; 77th Tony Awards	Best Lighting Design for a Musical	Hana S. Kim and Brian MacDevitt	The Outsiders
2024; 77th Tony Awards	Best Lighting Design for a Musical	Isabella Byrd	Cabaret at the Kit Kat Club
2024; 77th Tony Awards	Best Lighting Design for a Musical	Natasha Katz	Hell's Kitchen
2024; 77th Tony Awards	Best Lighting Design for a Musical	Brandon Stirling Baker	Illinoise
2024; 77th Tony Awards	Best Lighting Design for a Musical	David Bengali and Bradley King	Water for Elephants
2025; 78th Tony Awards	Best Lighting Design for a Play		
2025; 78th Tony Awards	Best Lighting Design for a Play	Jon Clark	Stranger Things: The First Shadow
2025; 78th Tony Awards	Best Lighting Design for a Play	David Bengali and Heather Gilbert	Good Night, and Good Luck
2025; 78th Tony Awards	Best Lighting Design for a Play	Natasha Chivers	The Hills of California
2025; 78th Tony Awards	Best Lighting Design for a Play	Natasha Katz and Hannah Wasileski	John Proctor Is the Villain
2025; 78th Tony Awards	Best Lighting Design for a Play	Nick Schlieper	The Picture of Dorian Gray
2025; 78th Tony Awards	Best Lighting Design for a Musical		
2025; 78th Tony Awards	Best Lighting Design for a Musical	Jack Knowles	Sunset Boulevard
2025; 78th Tony Awards	Best Lighting Design for a Musical	Tyler Micoleau	Buena Vista Social Club
2025; 78th Tony Awards	Best Lighting Design for a Musical	Justin Townsend	Death Becomes Her
2025; 78th Tony Awards	Best Lighting Design for a Musical	Ruey Horng Sun and Scott Zielinski	Floyd Collins
2025; 78th Tony Awards	Best Lighting Design for a Musical	Ben Stanton	Maybe Happy Ending
2026; 79th Tony Awards	Best Lighting Design for a Play		
2026; 79th Tony Awards	Best Lighting Design for a Play	Jack Knowles	Death of a Salesman
2026; 79th Tony Awards	Best Lighting Design for a Play	Isabella Byrd	Dog Day Afternoon
2026; 79th Tony Awards	Best Lighting Design for a Play	Natasha Chivers	Oedipus
2026; 79th Tony Awards	Best Lighting Design for a Play	Stacey Derosier	Joe Turner's Come and Gone
2026; 79th Tony Awards	Best Lighting Design for a Play	Heather Gilbert	Bug
2026; 79th Tony Awards	Best Lighting Design for a Play	Heather Gilbert	The Fear of 13
2026; 79th Tony Awards	Best Lighting Design for a Musical		
2026; 79th Tony Awards	Best Lighting Design for a Musical	Michael Arden and Jen Schriever	The Lost Boys
2026; 79th Tony Awards	Best Lighting Design for a Musical	Kevin Adams	Chess
2026; 79th Tony Awards	Best Lighting Design for a Musical	Jane Cox	Richard O'Brien's The Rocky Horror Show
2026; 79th Tony Awards	Best Lighting Design for a Musical	Donald Holder	Schmigadoon!
2026; 79th Tony Awards	Best Lighting Design for a Musical	Donald Holder, Adam Honoré, and 59 Studio	Ragtime
2026; 79th Tony Awards	Best Lighting Design for a Musical	Adam Honoré	Cats: The Jellicle Ball

== Award records ==
=== Multiple wins ===
9 Wins

- Jules Fisher

8 Wins

- Natasha Katz

5 Wins

- Brian MacDevitt

4 Wins

- Kevin Adams

3 Wins

- Neil Austin
- Andrew Bridge
- Peggy Eisenhauer
- David Hersey
- Tharon Musser

2 Wins

- Christopher Akerlind
- Howell Binkley
- Paule Constable
- Donald Holder
- Bradley King
- Jack Knowles
- Jennifer Tipton
- Hugh Vanstone

=== Multiple nominations ===
24 Nominations

- Jules Fisher

20 Nominations

- Natasha Katz

14 Nominations

- Donald Holder

12 Nominations

- Brian MacDevitt

11 Nominations

- Kenneth Posner

9 Nominations

- Ken Billington
- Howell Binkley
- Peggy Eisenhauer
- Tharon Musser

8 Nominations

- Kevin Adams
- Paul Gallo

7 Nominations

- David Hersey

6 Nominations

- Neil Austin
- Paule Constable

5 Nominations

- Christopher Akerlind
- Martin Aronstein
- Jane Cox
- Peter Kaczorowski
- Bradley King
- Ben Stanton
- Jennifer Tipton
- Hugh Vanstone

4 Nominations

- Allen Lee Hughes
- Neil Peter Jampolis
- Justin Townsend

3 Nominations

- Andrew Bridge
- Natasha Chivers
- Pat Collins
- Jane Cox
- Mark Henderson
- Jen Schriever
- Thomas R. Skelton
- Jan Versweyveld

2 Nominations

- John Bury
- Ian Calderon
- Jiyoun Chang
- Jon Clark
- Howard Harrison
- Jack Knowles
- Peter Mumford
- Richard Nelson

== See also ==
- Tony Award for Best Lighting Design in a Musical
- Tony Award for Best Lighting Design in a Play
- Drama Desk Award for Outstanding Lighting Design
- Laurence Olivier Award for Best Lighting Design
- List of Tony Award-nominated productions
