= Drama Desk Award for Outstanding Lighting Design of a Play =

American theatre award

- Awarded for: Outstanding Lighting Design of a Play
- Location: New York City
- Country: United States
- Presented by: Drama Desk
- First award: 2009
- Currently held by: Jack Knowles for Death of a Salesman (2026)
- Website: dramadesk.org (defunct)

The Drama Desk Award for Outstanding Lighting Design of a Play is an annual award presented by Drama Desk in recognition of achievements in theatre across collective Broadway, off-Broadway and off-off-Broadway productions in New York City.

The award was established in 1975, with the Drama Desk Award for Outstanding Lighting Design being presented each year to any play or musical production. For 2009, the singular award was replaced by separate play and musical categories, but then merged again from 2010 to 2015; the separate play and musical categories have again co-existed since 2016.

Both Christopher Akerlind and Amith Chandrashaker hold the record for most wins in the category, with two each. For nominations, Isabella Byrd has received the most, with four, followed closely by Chandrashaker and Jiyoun Chang with three nominations each.

== Winners and nominees ==
Key

and bold indicates the winner.

=== 2000s ===
Year	Designer	Production	Ref.
2009
2009	**David Hersey**	**Equus**	
2009	Marcus Doshi	Hamlet	
2009	Ben Kato	Washing Machine	
2009	R. Lee Kennedy	Bury the Dead	
2009	Paul Pyant	The Winter's Tale	
2009	Hugh Vanstone	Mary Stuart	

=== 2010s ===
Year	Designer	Production	Ref.
2010-2015	**N/A**		
2016
2016	**Justin Townsend**	**The Humans**	
2016	Neil Austin	Hughie	
2016	Mark Barton	John	
2016	Bradley King	Empanada Loca	
2016	Tyler Micoleau	Antlia Pneumatica	
2017
2017	**Christopher Akerlind**	**Indecent**	
2017	James Farncombe	The Tempest	
2017	Rick Fisher	The Judas Kiss	
2017	Mimi Jordan Sherin	The Hairy Ape	
2017	Stephen Strawbridge	"Master Harold"...and the Boys	
2017	Justin Townsend	The Little Foxes	
2018
2018	**Neil Austin**	**Harry Potter and the Cursed Child**	
2018	Natasha Chivers	1984	
2018	Alan C. Edwards	Kill Move Paradise	
2018	Paul Gallo	Three Tall Women	
2018	Paul Russell	Farinelli and the King	
2019
2019	**Amith Chandrashaker**	**Boesman and Lena**	
2019	Amith Chandrashaker	Fairview	
2019	Jiyoun Chang	Slave Play	
2019	Jon Clark	The Jungle	
2019	Simon Cleveland	Spaceman	
2019	Yi Zhao	The House That Will Not Stand	

=== 2020s ===
Year	Designer	Production	Ref.
2020
2020	**Heather Gilbert**	**The Sound Inside**	
2020	Isabella Byrd	Heroes of the Fourth Turning	
2020	Oona Curley	Dr. Ride's American Beach House	
2020	Mimi Jordan Sherin	Judgment Day	
2020	Yi Zhao	Greater Clements	
2021	No awards: New York theatres shuttered, March 2020 to September 2021, due to the COVID-19 pandemic in New York City		
2022	**Christopher Akerlind**	**Clyde's**	
2022	**Amith Chandrashaker**	**Prayer for the French Republic**	
2022	Reza Behjat	English	
2022	Isabella Byrd	Sanctuary City	
2022	Jeanette Oi-Suk Yew	Cullud Wattah	
2023	**Natasha Chivers & Willie Williams**	**Prima Facie**	
2023	Isabella Byrd	Epiphany	
2023	Jiyoun Chang	The Far Country	
2023	Allen Lee Hughes	Ohio State Murders	
2023	Cha See	On That Day in Amsterdam	
2023	Japhy Weideman	August Wilson's The Piano Lesson	
2024	**Jane Cox**	**Appropriate**	
2024	Stacey Derosier	Uncle Vanya	
2024	Jiyoun Chang	The Far Country	
2024	Natasha Katz	Grey House	
2024	Lizzie Powell	Macbeth (an undoing)	
2024	Eric Southern	Swing State	
2025	**Jon Clark**	**Stranger Things: The First Shadow**	
2025	Isabella Byrd	Glass. Kill. What If If Only. Imp.	
2025	Natasha Katz	John Proctor Is the Villain	
2025	Tyler Micoleau	The Antiquities	
2025	Paul Whitaker	SUMO	
2026
2026	**Jack Knowles**	**Death of a Salesman**	
2026	Isabella Byrd	Prince Faggot	
2026	Jeff Croiter	The Adding Machine	
2026	Stacy Derosier	Well, I'll Let You Go	
2026	Kate McGee	without mirrors	
2026	Studio Luna	Marcel on the Train	

== Multiple wins ==
2 wins

- Christopher Akerlind
- Amith Chandrashaker

== Multiple nominations ==
5 nominations

- Isabella Byrd

3 nominations

- Amith Chandrashaker
- Jiyoun Chang

2 nominations

- Justin Townsend
- Neil Austin
- Tyler Micoleau
- Christopher Akerlind
- Mimi Jordan Sherin
- Natasha Chivers
- Natasha Katz

== See also ==
- Laurence Olivier Award for Best Lighting Design
- Tony Award for Best Lighting Design
- Outer Critics Circle Award for Outstanding Lighting Design
- Lucille Lortel Award for Outstanding Lighting Design
