= List of awards and nominations received by The King and I =

The following tables list the major theatre awards and nominations received with respect to major market productions of the musical The King and I, by the team of Rodgers and Hammerstein.

The musical premiered on March 29, 1951, at Broadway's St. James Theatre. The musical won Tony Awards for Best Musical, Best Actress (for Gertrude Lawrence) and Best Featured Actor (for Yul Brynner). It played for 1,246 performances. A London run and U.S. national tour followed, and subsequent productions have earned further theatre awards.

== Original Broadway production ==
Year	Award Ceremony	Category	Nominee	Result	Ref
1951	New York Drama Critics' Circle Awards	Best Musical	Richard Rodgers and Oscar Hammerstein II	Runner-up	
1952	Tony Award	Best Musical		Won	
1952	Tony Award	Best Performance by a Leading Actress in a Musical	Gertrude Lawrence	Won	
1952	Tony Award	Best Performance by a Featured Actor in a Musical	Yul Brynner	Won	
1952	Tony Award	Best Scenic Design	Jo Mielziner	Won	
1952	Tony Award	Best Costume Design	Irene Sharaff	Won	

== 1977 Broadway revival ==
Year	Award Ceremony	Category	Nominee	Result	Ref
1977	Drama Desk Award	Outstanding Musical		Nominated	
1977	Drama Desk Award	Outstanding Actor in a Musical	Yul Brynner	Nominated	
1977	Drama Desk Award	Outstanding Actress in a Musical	Angela Lansbury (1978)	Nominated	

== 1979 West End revival ==
Year	Award Ceremony	Category	Nominee	Result	Ref
1979	Laurence Olivier Award	Best Actress in a Musical	Virginia McKenna	Won	

== 1985 Broadway revival ==
Year	Award Ceremony	Category	Nominee	Result	Ref
1985	Tony Award	Special Tony Award	Yul Brynner	Won	
1985	Tony Award	Best Performance by a Featured Actress in a Musical	Mary Beth Peil	Nominated	
1985	Tony Award	Best Direction of a Musical	Mitch Leigh	Nominated	

== 1996 Broadway revival ==
Year	Award Ceremony	Category	Nominee	Result	Ref
1996	Tony Award	Best Revival of a Musical		Won	
1996	Tony Award	Best Performance by a Leading Actor in a Musical	Lou Diamond Phillips	Nominated	
1996	Tony Award	Best Performance by a Leading Actress in a Musical	Donna Murphy	Won	
1996	Tony Award	Best Performance by a Featured Actress in a Musical	Joohee Choi	Nominated	
1996	Tony Award	Best Direction of a Musical	Christopher Renshaw	Nominated	
1996	Tony Award	Best Scenic Design	Brian Thomson	Won	
1996	Tony Award	Best Costume Design	Roger Kirk	Won	
1996	Tony Award	Best Lighting Design	Nigel Levings	Nominated	
1996	Drama Desk Award	Outstanding Revival of a Musical		Won	
1996	Drama Desk Award	Outstanding Actor in a Musical	Lou Diamond Phillips	Nominated	
1996	Drama Desk Award	Outstanding Actress in a Musical	Donna Murphy	Nominated	
1996	Drama Desk Award	Outstanding Director of a Musical	Christopher Renshaw	Won	
1996	Drama Desk Award	Outstanding Set Design	Brian Thomson	Won	
1996	Drama Desk Award	Outstanding Costume Design	Roger Kirk	Won	
1996	Drama Desk Award	Outstanding Lighting Design	Nigel Levings	Nominated	
1996	Theatre World Award	Joohee Choi		Won	
1996	Theatre World Award	Lou Diamond Phillips		Won	

== 2000 West End revival ==
Year	Award Ceremony	Category	Nominee	Result	Ref
2001	Laurence Olivier Award	Outstanding Musical Production		Nominated	
2001	Laurence Olivier Award	Best Performance in a Supporting Role in a Musical	Taewon Yi Kim	Nominated	
2001	Laurence Olivier Award	Best Set Design	Brian Thomson	Nominated	
2001	Laurence Olivier Award	Best Costume Design	Roger Kirk	Nominated	

== 2015 Broadway revival ==
Year	Award Ceremony	Category	Nominee	Result	Ref
2015	Tony Award	Best Revival of a Musical		Won	
2015	Tony Award	Best Performance by a Leading Actor in a Musical	Ken Watanabe	Nominated	
2015	Tony Award	Best Performance by a Leading Actress in a Musical	Kelli O'Hara	Won	
2015	Tony Award	Best Performance by a Featured Actress in a Musical	Ruthie Ann Miles	Won	
2015	Tony Award	Best Direction of a Musical	Bartlett Sher	Nominated	
2015	Tony Award	Best Scenic Design	Michael Yeargan	Nominated	
2015	Tony Award	Best Costume Design	Catherine Zuber	Won	
2015	Tony Award	Best Lighting Design	Donald Holder	Nominated	
2015	Tony Award	Best Choreography	Christopher Gattelli	Nominated	
2015	Drama Desk Award	Outstanding Revival of a Musical		Won	
2015	Drama Desk Award	Outstanding Sound Design	Scott Lehrer	Nominated	
2016	Grammy Award	Best Musical Theater Album	David Lai & Ted Sperling (producers)	Nominated	

== 2018 West End revival ==
Year	Award Ceremony	Category	Nominee	Result	Ref
2018	Laurence Olivier Award	Laurence Olivier Award for Best Musical Revival		Nominated	
2018	Laurence Olivier Award	Best Performance by a Leading Actor in a Musical	Ken Watanabe	Nominated	
2018	Laurence Olivier Award	Best Performance by a Leading Actress in a Musical	Kelli O'Hara	Nominated	
2018	Laurence Olivier Award	Best Actress in a Supporting Role in a Musical	Ruthie Ann Miles	Nominated	
2018	Laurence Olivier Award	Theatre Choreographer	Christopher Gattelli	Nominated	
2018	Laurence Olivier Award	Best Costume Design	Catherine Zuber	Won	
