= Shuffle Along, or, the Making of the Musical Sensation of 1921 and All That Followed =

Musical by Eubie Blake, Noble Sissle and George C. Wolfe

- Playbill cover of the original Broadway production
- Music: Eubie Blake; Noble Sissle
- Lyrics: Eubie Blake; Noble Sissle
- Book: George C. Wolfe
- Basis: Shuffle Along by Eubie Blake; Noble Sissle; Flournoy Miller; Aubrey Lyles
- Premiere: April 28, 2016: Music Box Theatre
- Productions: 2016 Broadway
- Awards: 2016 Drama Desk Award for Outstanding Musical; 2016 New York Drama Critics Circle Award for Best Musical

Shuffle Along, or, the Making of the Musical Sensation of 1921 and All That Followed is a musical with a score by Eubie Blake and Noble Sissle and a libretto by George C. Wolfe, based on the original book of the 1921 musical revue Shuffle Along, by Flournoy Miller and Aubrey Lyles. The story focuses on the challenges of mounting the original production of Shuffle Along and its effect on Broadway and race relations.

The musical played on Broadway in 2016 and starred Audra McDonald, Brian Stokes Mitchell, Brandon Victor Dixon and Billy Porter. The initial critical response was mostly positive, with special praise from many critics for McDonald's performance. The production was nominated for ten Tony Awards but did not win any; it won four Drama Desk Awards, including Outstanding Musical. Shuffle Along closed on July 24, 2016 after 38 previews and 100 regular performances.

== Background ==
When Blake, Sissle, Miller and Lyles decided to collaborate on Shuffle Along, they were all Vaudeville veterans, but none of them had ever written a musical or appeared on Broadway. After finding a small source of funding, Shuffle Along toured through New Jersey and Pennsylvania. However, with little funding, it was difficult to meet travel and production expenses, and the cast rarely got paid. The show came back to New York about a year later, during the Depression of 1920–21. The production owed $18,000 and faced strong competition in a Broadway season full of spectacles, such as Sally – a Ziegfeld musical – and another edition of George White's Scandals. It was only able to book a remote theater on West 63rd Street.

Nevertheless, Shuffle Along was a surprise hit, running for 504 performances, turning a substantial profit and spawning tours and spin-offs. The show introduced several innovations; launched or greatly boosted the career of cast members including Josephine Baker, Paul Robeson, Florence Mills, Fredi Washington and Adelaide Hall; and the song "I'm Just Wild About Harry" became a popular standard. The show's energetic dancing and catchy jazz score drew enthusiastic repeat audiences of all races, and celebrities such as George Gershwin, Fanny Brice, Al Jolson, Langston Hughes and critic George Jean Nathan, helping to unite the white Broadway and black jazz communities and improve race relations in America.

Wolfe's book includes a white character who embodies the comments by white critics and other outsiders on Shuffle Along.

== Synopsis ==
Flournoy "F. E." Miller and his vaudeville partner Aubrey Lyles conceive the show that was to become Shuffle Along. They meet fellow vaudevillians Noble Sissle and Eubie Blake and decide to team up to create the all-black production. They tour the show, playing one-night stands in Maryland, Washington, D.C., and Pennsylvania, packing the cast into cheap motels and selling their personal possessions to pay for train fare. A romance develops between the married Eubie Blake and the show's leading lady, Lottie Gee, a veteran vaudeville performer who finally got her chance to star in the show. The creatives discuss whether or not to include a love song and embrace between the two black leads, a controversial experiment that had been received with tar and feathers in the few instances where it had been tried before; fortunately, the audiences accept it. Arriving in New York during the Depression of 1920–21, Shuffle Along is deep in debt and struggles to raise money. It faces stiff competition on Broadway in a season that includes surefire hits from Florenz Ziegfeld Jr. and George White, and it was relegated to a remote theater on West 63rd Street with no orchestra pit. Opening night is a hit!

Shuffle Along becomes a long-running success, with popular songs like "I'm Just Wild About Harry". The partners do not have the same success during the following years and argue about royalties. Lyles announces that he is moving to Africa, and the creators go their separate ways. The romance between Blake and Gee ends. Everyone wants to be remembered for having done something important, but over the decades, the show fades into obscurity.

== Musical numbers ==
Act I

- "Broadway Blues" – Company
- "Affectionate Dan" – Noble, Eubie
- "Sellin' the Show" – Eubie, Noble, F.E., Aubrey
- "Introducing Sam" – Sam, Eubie, Noble, F.E., Aubrey
- "Makin' a Show" – Company
- "I’m Simply Full of Jazz" – Gertrude, Jimtown Flappers
- "Honeysuckle Time" – Lottie, Eubie
- "Swing Along" – F.E., Company
- "Campaign Songs" – Company
- "Bandana Days" – Jazz Jasmines
- "Love Will Find a Way" – Lottie
- "If You’ve Never Been Vamped by a Brownskin" – Harmony Kings
- "You Got to Git the Gittin' While the Gittin's Good" – Noble, Noble's Shadows
- "Ain't It a Shame" – Company
- "Pennsylvania Graveyard Shuffle" – Dancin' Kids
- "Daddy, Won’t You Please Come Home" – Lottie
- "(I'm Just) Wild About Harry" – Lottie, Gertrude, Li'l Baby C
- "Act One Finale" – Company

Act II

- "Dance Around the One" – Dancin' Kids, Harmony Kings
- "Shuffle Along" – Lottie, Dancing Waiters
- "Struttin'" – Noble, Eubie, F.E., Aubrey
- "I’m Cravin' That Kind of Love" – Florence, Lottie
- "Till Georgie Took 'Em Away" – Harmony Kings, William Grant Still
- "The Broadway Buzz" – Izzy, Company
- "Rang Tang/Chocolate Dandies" – The Dancin' Kids
- "It’s Getting Dark on Old Broadway" – Mr. Broadway, Mr. Broadway's Girls
- "The Comedy Chorus Gal" – Freda, Baker Boys
- "Uptown Noir" – Harmony Kings
- "You're Lucky to Me" – Lottie, Eubie
- "Low Down Blues" – Aubrey
- "Shuffle Along" (reprise) – F.E.
- "Musical Selections with Sissle and Blake" – Eubie, Noble, Harriet, Avis
- "Memories of You" – Lottie
- "The Original Broadway Rag" – Carlo, Company
- "Shuffle Off" – Florence, Lottie, F.E., Aubrey, Eubie, Noble

== Productions ==
The show was given two workshops in the fall 2015; there was no out-of-town tryout. The production began previews on Broadway on March 15 and opened officially on April 28, 2016, at the Music Box Theatre, directed by Wolfe, with choreography by Savion Glover. The two worked together two decades earlier, with great success, on Bring in 'da Noise, Bring in 'da Funk. The show was promoted as a revival of the original Shuffle Along, even though the two shows have different plots; Michael Paulson of The New York Times regarded this an attempt by producer Scott Rudin to avoid competing with Hamilton at the Tony Awards. The show was nominated for Best Musical, losing to Hamilton.

Due to Audra McDonald's pregnancy, the producers planned to replace her beginning July 26. They later reversed course, saying McDonald's prolonged absence would make it too difficult to continue running the show, which was already running at a loss. The musical closed with McDonald's departure on July 24, 2016, after 38 previews and 100 regular performances.

=== Characters and original cast ===
Character	Cast
Lottie Gee	Audra McDonald
F. E. Miller	Brian Stokes Mitchell
Aubrey Lyles	Billy Porter
Eubie Blake	Brandon Victor Dixon
Noble Sissle	Joshua Henry
Al, Izzy, Mr. Broadway, Carlo	Brooks Ashmanskas
Gertrude Saunders, Florence Mills	Adrienne Warren
Mattie Wilkes, Madame-Madame, Eva	Amber Iman

== Critical response ==
Opening night reviews were mostly positive, especially with respect to the songs and dancing, with nearly all reviewers giving Audra McDonald rave notices. Ben Brantley of The New York Times calls it an "intoxicating and sobering concoction", writing: "Often you sense that Mr. Wolfe has a checklist of historic points he must, but must, cover. ... The clunky, shoehorned-in exposition doesn't overwhelm the sweeping grace of "Shuffle Along" whenever it sings or dances."

Terry Teachout, reviewing for The Wall Street Journal, wrote: "The first half of ... Shuffle Along is to 2016 what Hamilton was to 2015: It's the musical you’ve got to see. ... The cast, led by Audra McDonald, Brian Stokes Mitchell and Billy Porter, is as charismatic as you’d expect, and Savion Glover's near-nonstop choreography explodes off the stage with the unrelenting impact of a flamethrower. But then comes intermission, and what had looked like a masterpiece goes flat and stays that way."

In her review for Variety, Marilyn Stasio wrote that the show "is to die for" and is "ebullient", and that an "incoherent book" is a "small price to pay for the joy of watching Audra McDonald cut loose."

== Major awards and nominations ==
Year	Award	Category	Nominee	Result
2016	Tony Award	Best Musical		Nominated
2016	Tony Award	Best Book of a Musical	George C. Wolfe	Nominated
2016	Tony Award	Best Featured Actor in a Musical	Brandon Victor Dixon	Nominated
2016	Tony Award	Best Featured Actress in a Musical	Adrienne Warren	Nominated
2016	Tony Award	Best Scenic Design of a Musical	Santo Loquasto	Nominated
2016	Tony Award	Best Costume Design of a Musical	Ann Roth	Nominated
2016	Tony Award	Best Lighting Design of a Musical	Jules Fisher and Peggy Eisenhauer	Nominated
2016	Tony Award	Best Direction of a Musical	George C. Wolfe	Nominated
2016	Tony Award	Best Choreography	Savion Glover	Nominated
2016	Tony Award	Best Orchestrations	Daryl Waters	Nominated
2016	Drama Desk Award	Outstanding Musical		Won
2016	Drama Desk Award	Outstanding Costume Design for a Musical	Ann Roth	Won
2016	Drama Desk Award	Outstanding Lighting Design for a Musical	Jules Fisher and Peggy Eisenhauer	Nominated
2016	Drama Desk Award	Outstanding Sound Design in a Musical	Scott Lehrer	Nominated
2016	Drama Desk Award	Outstanding Wig and Hair Design	Mia M. Neal	Won
2016	Drama Desk Award	Outstanding Choreography	Savion Glover	Won
2016	New York Drama Critics' Circle Award	Best Musical	George C. Wolfe, Eubie Blake and Noble Sissle	Won
2016	Fred and Adele Astaire Awards	Outstanding Female Dancer in a Broadway Show	Adrienne Warren	Nominated
2016	Fred and Adele Astaire Awards	Outstanding Male Dancer in a Broadway Show	Phillip Attmore	Won
2016	Fred and Adele Astaire Awards	Outstanding Male Dancer in a Broadway Show	Curtis Holland	Nominated
2016	Fred and Adele Astaire Awards	Outstanding Male Dancer in a Broadway Show	Kendrick Jones	Nominated
2016	Fred and Adele Astaire Awards	Outstanding Choreographer in a Broadway Show	Savion Glover	Won
2016	Fred and Adele Astaire Awards	Outstanding Ensemble in a Broadway Show		Won
