= Andrew Bridge (lighting designer) =

British lighting designer

Andrew Bridge is a Broadway and West End lighting designer, who has worked on many Broadway productions, including The Phantom of the Opera. He has won the Tony Award for Best Lighting Design three times: in 1988 for The Phantom of the Opera, 1995 for Sunset Boulevard, and in 1999 for Fosse.

In December 2010 he became the 12th ever 'Fellow of the ALD'. This was awarded to him for his outstanding contribution to the art of lighting design.

== Stage credits ==
Year	Title	Role	Venue	Ref.
1984	Oliver!	Lighting Designer	Broadway, Mark Hellinger Theatre	
1988	The Phantom of the Opera	Lighting Designer	Broadway, Majestic Theatre	
1990	Aspects of Love	Lighting Designer	Broadway, Broadhurst Theatre	
1992	Five Guys Named Moe	Lighting Designer	Broadway, Eugene O'Neill Theatre	
1993	Joseph and the Amazing Technicolor Dreamcoat	Lighting Designer	Broadway, Minskoff Theatre	
1994	Sunset Boulevard	Lighting Designer	Broadway, Minskoff Theatre	
1999	Fosse	Lighting Designer	Broadway, Broadhurst Theatre	
1999	Saturday Night Fever	Lighting Designer	Broadway, Minskoff Theatre	

== Awards and nominations ==
Year	Award	Category	Work	Result	Ref.
1988	Tony Award	Best Lighting Design	The Phantom of the Opera	Won	
1988	Drama Desk Award	Outstanding Lighting Design	The Phantom of the Opera	Won	
1988	Outer Critics Circle Award	Outstanding Lighting Design	The Phantom of the Opera	Won	
1990	Drama Desk Award	Outstanding Lighting Design	Aspects of Love	Nominated	
1995	Tony Award	Best Lighting Design	Sunset Boulevard	Won	
1999	Tony Award	Best Lighting Design	Fosse	Won	
1999	Outer Critics Circle Award	Outstanding Lighting Design	Fosse	Nominated	
