= Neil Austin (lighting designer) =

English lighting designer

Neil Austin is an English lighting designer. He has been nominated for nine and won two Olivier Awards, and won three Tony Awards from six nominations for his work on plays and musicals in London and New York. Neil is the lighting designer for Harry Potter and the Cursed Child for which he has received global acclaim, including the Olivier, Tony, Drama Desk, Helpmann, Outer Critics Circle, Dora Mavor, and WhatsOnStage Awards for best lighting design.

Neil studied Technical Theatre at the Guildhall School of Music and Drama and was made a Fellow in 2008. Variety named him a Pacesetter on the London Arts Scene in 2007, and an Artisan Elite in 2019.

== Awards ==
Year	Nominated work	Category	Result	Notes
2026	Paddington: The Musical	WhatsOnStage Award for Best Lighting Design	Nominated	
2026	Born with Teeth	WhatsOnStage Award for Best Lighting Design	Nominated	
2023	Leopoldstadt	Tony Award for Best Lighting Design in a Play	Nominated	
2023	Leopoldstadt	Outer Critics Circle Award for Outstanding Lighting Design	Nominated	
2023	Tammy Faye	WhatsOnStage Award for Best Lighting Design	Nominated	
2022	Harry Potter and the Cursed Child	Dora Mavor Moore Awards for Outstanding Lighting Design	Won	
2022	The 47th	BroadwayWorld Award for Best Lighting Design	Nominated	
2022	Company	Tony Award for Best Lighting Design in a Musical	Nominated	
2022	Frozen	Laurence Olivier Award for Best Lighting Design	Nominated	
2022	Frozen	WhatsOnStage Award for Best Lighting Design	Nominated	
2020	Rosmersholm	Laurence Olivier Award for Best Lighting Design	Nominated	
2019	Ink	Tony Award for Best Lighting Design in a Play	Won	
2019	Ink	Knight of Illumination Award (USA) for Best Lighting Design (Play - Large Venue)	Nominated	
2019	Company	Laurence Olivier Award for Best Lighting Design	Nominated	
2019	Company	WhatsOnStage Award for Best Lighting Design	Nominated	
2019	Company	Knight of Illumination Award for Best Lighting Design (Musical Theatre)	Won	
2019	Harry Potter and the Cursed Child	Helpmann Award for Best Lighting Design	Won	
2019	Rosmersholm	BroadwayWorld Award for Best Lighting Design	Nominated	
2018	Harry Potter and the Cursed Child	Tony Award for Best Lighting Design in a Play	Won	
2018	Harry Potter and the Cursed Child	Drama Desk Award for Outstanding Lighting Design for a Play	Won	
2018	Harry Potter and the Cursed Child	Outer Critics Circle Award for Outstanding Lighting Design	Won	
2018	Translations	BroadwayWorld Award for Best Lighting Design	Nominated	
2017	Harry Potter and the Cursed Child	Laurence Olivier Award for Best Lighting Design	Won	
2017	Harry Potter and the Cursed Child	WhatsOnStage Award for Best Lighting Design	Won	
2016	The Winter's Tale	Laurence Olivier Award for Best Lighting Design	Nominated	
2016	Hughie	Drama Desk Award for Outstanding Lighting Design for a Play	Nominated	
2015	Assassins	Knight of Illumination Award for Best Lighting Design (Musical Theatre)	Nominated	
2015	The Winter's Tale	Falstaff Award for Best Lighting Design	Won	
2013	Macbeth	Manchester Theatre Award for Best Design	Nominated	
2013	Macbeth	Falstaff Award for Best Lighting Design	Won	
2012	Evita	Drama Desk Award for Outstanding Lighting Design for a Musical	Nominated	
2012	Evita	Outer Critics Circle Award for Outstanding Lighting Design	Nominated	
2012	Company	Knight of Illumination Award for Best Lighting Design (Musical Theatre)	Won	
2012	Betty Blue Eyes	WhatsOnStage Award for Best Lighting Design	Nominated	
2011	The White Guard	Laurence Olivier Award for Best Lighting Design	Won	
2011	Passion	Knight of Illumination Award for Best Lighting Design (Musical Theatre)	Nominated	
2011	The Prince of Homburg	WhatsOnStage Award for Best Lighting Design	Nominated	
2011	Women Beware Women	WhatsOnStage Award for Best Lighting Design	Nominated	
2010	Red	Tony Award for Best Lighting Design in a Play	Won	
2010	Red	Drama Desk Award for Outstanding Lighting Design for a Play	Won	
2010	Red	LDI Award for Excellence in Lighting Design	Won	
2010	Hamlet	Tony Award for Best Lighting Design in a Play	Nominated	
2010	Hamlet	Drama Desk Award for Outstanding Lighting Design for a Play	Nominated	
2010	Hamlet	LDI Award for Excellence in Lighting Design	Won	
2010	Judgement Day	Knight of Illumination Award for Best Lighting Design (Play)	Nominated	
2010	Madame de Sade	WhatsOnStage Award for Best Lighting Design	Nominated	
2010	Life is a Dream	WhatsOnStage Award for Best Lighting Design	Nominated	
2010	Parade	LA Stage Alliance Ovation Awards	Nominated	
2010	Parade	Backstage Garland Award for Lighting Design	Won	
2009	Piaf	Laurence Olivier Award for Best Lighting Design	Nominated	
2009	Piaf	WhatsOnStage Award for Best Lighting Design	Nominated	
2009	Piaf	Knight of Illumination Award for Best Lighting Design (Musical Theatre)	Nominated	
2009	No Man's Land	Laurence Olivier Award for Best Lighting Design	Nominated	
2009	No Man's Land	Irish Times Theatre Award for Best Lighting Designer	Nominated	
2009	Oedipus	WhatsOnStage Award for Best Lighting Design	Nominated	
2009	Life is a Dream	WhatsOnStage Award for Best Lighting Design	Nominated	
2009	Twelfth Night	Knight of Illumination Award for Best Lighting Design (Play)	Nominated	
2008	Parade	Knight of Illumination Award for Best Lighting Design (Musical Theatre)	Won	
2007	Therese Raquin	Laurence Olivier Award for Best Lighting Design	Nominated	
2007	Frost/Nixon	Outer Critics Circle Award for Outstanding Lighting Design	Nominated	
