= Dots (design studio) =

New York design studio

dots
- Industry: Scenic design
- Founded: 2020 in Brooklyn, New York
- Founder: Andrew Moerdyk; Kimie Nishikawa; Santiago Orjuela-Laverde
- Website: designbydots.com

Dots (stylized as dots) is a New York-based design collective known for their work in theatrical set design.

== History ==
Dots was founded in 2020 by Santiago Orjuela-Laverde, Andrew Moerdyk, and Kimie Nishikawa, who met while attending NYU's Tisch School of the Arts.

Their work first appeared on Broadway in the 2023 revival of The Sign in Sidney Brustein's Window. Their scenic design for Appropriate and An Enemy of the People, both in 2024, received nominations for the Tony Award for Best Scenic Design in a Play. For their work on the 2026 Broadway revival of The Rocky Horror Show, dots was nominated for the Tony Award for Best Scenic Design in a Musical. Their work on Broadway also includes Oh, Mary! (2024), Romeo and Juliet (2024), and Floyd Collins (2025).

Dots has worked on film and television projects, including The Green Veil. In 2025, dots designed the sets for Sarah Sherman's HBO special, Sarah Squirm: Live + In The Flesh.

In 2025, dots was awarded a United States Artists Fellowship.
