= Martin Aronstein =

American lighting designer

Martin Aronstein (November 2, 1936 – May 3, 2002) was an American lighting designer whose Broadway career spanned thirty-six years.

Born in Pittsfield, Massachusetts, Aronstein attended Queens College in Flushing, New York. In 1957, following a performance sponsored by the New York Shakespeare Festival, he approached a backstage worker and asked if he could help break down the set. He apprenticed with the festival and worked there for five years before being named its principal lighting designer, a position he held until 1976. He also served as the resident lighting supervisor at Lincoln Center for the Performing Arts.

Aronstein made his Broadway debut as the lighting assistant for Arturo Ui in 1963. Additional Broadway credits include The Milk Train Doesn't Stop Here Anymore, Tiny Alice, The Impossible Years, Cactus Flower, The Royal Hunt of the Sun, How Now, Dow Jones, George M!, Promises, Promises, Play It Again, Sam, The Gingerbread Lady, Ain't Supposed to Die a Natural Death, The Incomparable Max, And Miss Reardon Drinks a Little, My Fat Friend, The Ritz, The Grand Tour, Noises Off, Benefactors, and The Twilight of the Golds.

Aronstein was nominated for the Tony Award for Best Lighting Design five times and the Drama Desk Award for Outstanding Lighting Design once but failed to win either prize.

In 1977 Aronstein relocated to Southern California, where he designed for the Mark Taper Forum, the Ahmanson Theatre, and the Pasadena Playhouse on a regular basis. In 1978, he also created the lighting design for the musical Barbary Coast at the Orpheum Theatre.

He won the Los Angeles Drama Critics Circle Award for A Month in the Country in 1983 and Passion in 1984, and in 1996 he was awarded the Circle's Angstrom Award for career achievement in theatrical lighting. He was also an adjunct professor at the theater school of the University of Southern California, and designed for the San Francisco Ballet, the St. Louis Municipal Opera, and the John F. Kennedy Center for the Performing Arts.

Aronstein died of heart failure at Valley Presbyterian Hospital in Van Nuys, California. He was survived by life partner Lawrence Metzler.
