= Jane Cox (lighting designer) =

Irish lighting designer

- Born: Dublin, Ireland
- Education: University of London
- Occupation: Lighting designer
- Awards: Tony Award for Best Lighting Design of a Play

Jane Cox is an Irish lighting designer. She has been nominated for five Tony Awards, and won the 2024 Tony Award for Best Lighting Design of a Play for her work on Appropriate. She teaches at Princeton University.

== Early life and education ==
Jane Cox is from Dublin, Ireland. Her parents had moved there from the north of England; her mother worked for Amnesty International Ireland and her father was a professor at Trinity College.

Cox studied flute at the University of London before changing her major to theatre. She worked as a light board operator on an undergraduate production of a Caryl Churchill play, an experience she found to be "like music, only in a visual medium." She studied abroad at the University of Massachusetts, Amherst, where she was mentored by American lighting designer Penny Remson.

After relocating to the United States, Cox worked odd jobs, including as a theater electrician at Hartford Stage, before pursuing graduate studies at New York University Tisch School of the Arts. At NYU, Cox studied with lighting designer John Gleason. She graduated in 1998 with an MFA in lighting design. She credits another member of the NYU faculty, Susan Hilferty, with helping her get her first professional design job after graduate school. In 2001, Cox was accepted into the National Endowment for the Arts/Theater Communications Group Career Development Program for promising early-career artists.

== Lighting design ==
Over the course of a decades-long career, Cox has designed theatre, opera, and dance productions in the United States and internationally. She has an extensive list of Broadway credits, including Macbeth (2022), which starred Daniel Craig and Ruth Negga, and the musical adaptation of Amélie. She has also worked off-Broadway and at regional theatres across the United States. Internationally, her work has been seen at the Abbey Theatre in Dublin and the National Theatre in London.

Her major collaborators include the directors Sam Gold and John Doyle, the choreographer Monica Bill Barnes. Lighting designers Isabella Byrd and Stacey Derosier worked with her early in their careers in the role of associate designer.

Cox has described her design process as beginning with the show's text or musical score, which she reads or listens to several times before beginning creative discussions with the director and other collaborators. She sees lighting in a live performance setting as a way to craft atmosphere and invoke certain feelings, as well as to direct the audience's attention. She describes herself as "primarily fascinated with how much light and shadow can be used to reveal and to hide a human being onstage...the audience's relationship to their own imaginations shifts as stage information is hidden and revealed."

She has a great interest in color, and favors a palette of greens, golds, and yellows. Cox has cited painters William John Leech and Henri de Toulouse-Lautrec as major influences on her use of color, as well as the work of light and space artist James Turrell.

In 2017, Cox designed Sunday in the Park with George at the Guthrie Theater, directed by Joseph Haj. In an interview, she framed her work in relationship to the musical's interest in the way light and color are rendered in painting, and described the play of light and shadow in Georges Seurat's monochromatic preparatory sketches as a major inspiration.

In 2022's Broadway production of Macbeth, Cox and director Sam Gold drew creative inspiration from a comparison between theater craft and witchcraft. They chose a heavily saturated color palette influenced by horror films, feminist artists like Judy Chicago, and the band Pussy Riot's punk-activist spectacles. In the production, the actors operated custom-built portable fog machines and handheld lighting instruments to shape the atmosphere onstage.

=== Appropriate ===
Cox's lighting design for Second Stage Theater's 2023 production of Appropriate won the Tony Award for Best Lighting Design of a Play, as well as a Drama Desk Award. The show, by playwright Branden Jacobs-Jenkins, opened at the Helen Hayes Theater in December and later moved to the Belasco Theatre. It was directed by Lila Neugebauer, and the creative team included the scenic design collective dots, costume designer Dede Ayite, and sound design by Will Pickens and Bray Poor.

Cox and Neugebauer developed a design concept by first focusing on the play's third-act coup de theatre, which requires the house at the heart of the play's plot to decay before the audience's eyes in a sped-up manner akin to time-lapse photography. Cox described the sequence as "chang[ing] days hundreds of times in quick succession," which required the programming of hundreds of cues that culminate in a strobing effect. They worked backward from there to draw out a stage picture for the rest of the play, one characterized by obscurity and claustrophobia.

Cox's attire for the 2024 Tony Awards was inspired by the soundscape of cicada song that scores the play's transitions. She wore a custom-made dress with a prominent cicada print, as well as a cicada pendant necklace. Cox dedicated her Tony win to "all the patient partners and children of theater-makers everywhere."

=== Critical reception ===
The New York Times has described Cox's work as "painterly" and "eye-teasing". Critic Jesse Green called her work for Annie Baker's The Flick at Playwrights Horizons "almost orgasmically expressive." In Variety, her lighting for a National Theatre production of Hamlet starring Benedict Cumberbatch was compared to "sumptuous cinematography."

== Stage credits ==
Year	Title	Role	Venue	Ref.
2000	The Ride Down Mt. Morgan	Assistant Lighting Designer	Broadway, Ambassador Theatre	
2002	Morning's at Seven	Associate Lighting Designer	Broadway, Lyceum Theatre	
2004	Dame Edna: Back with a Vengeance	Lighting Designer	Broadway, Music Box Theatre	
2008	Come Back, Little Sheba	Lighting Designer	Broadway, Biltmore Theatre	
2013	Picnic	Lighting Designer	Broadway, American Airlines Theatre	
2013	Passion	Lighting Designer	Off-Broadway, Classic Stage Company	
2013	The Flick	Lighting Designer	Off-Broadway, Playwrights Horizons	
2014	Machinal	Lighting Designer	Broadway, American Airlines Theatre	
2014	All the Way	Lighting Designer	Broadway, Neil Simon Theatre	
2015	The Color Purple	Lighting Designer	Broadway, Bernard B. Jacobs Theatre	
2015	The Flick	Lighting Designer	Off-Broadway, Barrow Street Theatre	
2016	Noises Off	Lighting Designer	Broadway, American Airlines Theatre	
2017	Jitney	Lighting Designer	Broadway, Samuel J. Friedman Theatre	
2017	Amélie	Lighting Designer	Broadway, Walter Kerr Theatre	
2019	True West	Lighting Designer	Broadway, American Airlines Theatre	
2019	King Lear	Lighting Designer	Broadway, Cort Theatre	
2019	The Secret Life of Bees	Lighting Designer	Off-Broadway, Atlantic Theatre Company	
2019	Macbeth	Lighting Designer	Off-Broadway, Classic Stage Company	
2022	Macbeth	Lighting Designer	Broadway, Longacre Theatre	
2023	Appropriate	Lighting Designer	Broadway, Belasco Theatre	
2026	The Rocky Horror Show	Lighting Designer	Broadway, Studio 54	

== Awards and nominations ==
Year	Award	Category	Production	Result	Ref.
2013	Drama Desk Award	Outstanding Lighting Design	Passion	Nominated	
2013	Henry Hewes Design Award		The Flick	Won	
2014	Tony Award	Best Lighting Design of a Play	Machinal	Nominated	
2014	Drama Desk Award	Outstanding Lighting Design	Machinal	Nominated	
2016	Ruth Morley Design Award			Won	
2016	Drama Desk Award	Outstanding Lighting Design of a Musical	The Color Purple	Nominated	
2017	Tony Award	Best Lighting Design of a Play	Jitney	Nominated	
2019	Drama Desk Award	Outstanding Lighting Design of a Musical	The Secret Life of Bees	Nominated	
2022	Tony Award	Best Lighting Design of a Play	Macbeth	Nominated	
2024	Tony Award	Best Lighting Design of a Play	Appropriate	Won	
2024	Drama Desk Award	Outstanding Lighting Design of a Play	Appropriate	Won	
2026	Tony Award	Best Lighting Design of a Musical	Richard O'Brien's Rocky Horror Show	Nominated	

== Other work ==
Since 2016, Jane Cox has been the director of the Program in Theater and Music Theater at Princeton University. She has been on the Princeton faculty since 2007. Cox has also taught at NYU Tisch, UMass Amherst, Vassar College, and Sarah Lawrence College.

Cox has worked as a producer and arts administrator. in 2020, she was one of the founding members of Design Action, a coalition of theater designers organized against racial inequity in theater design and advocating for change in the theater industry. As part of her work with Design Action, Cox was one of the co-organizers of the Park Avenue Armory's 2023 symposium event "Sound & Color: The Future of Race in Design" alongside fellow theater artists Branden Jacobs-Jenkins, Mimi Lien, and Mikaal Sulaiman, and curator Tavia Nyong'o. The event was partly inspired by a class that Cox had co-taught at Princeton with Branden Jacobs-Jenkins, focused on race and lighting design.

== Personal life ==
Cox lives in Princeton, New Jersey. She is married to designer Evan Alexander, with whom she has a daughter, Becket.
