= Appropriate (play) =

2014 play written by American Branden Jacobs-Jenkins

- Broadway promotional poster
- Original language: English
- Written by: Branden Jacobs-Jenkins
- Subject: Drama
- Setting: The living room of a former plantation home in southeast Arkansas. Summer.

Premiere
- Date: 2013
- Place: Actors Theatre of Louisville

Appropriate is a dramatic play written by American playwright Branden Jacobs-Jenkins. It was first performed in 2013 and premiered Off-Broadway the following year.

A 2023 revival won a Tony and Drama Desk awards, in addition to awards for the lead actress.

== Plot ==
In 2011, the unnamed patriarch of the Lafayette family has recently died. He leaves the family home in Southeastern Arkansas, an old plantation, to his three children: the overworked elder daughter Toni, the tactless middle brother Bo, and the estranged brother Franz. Toni has been made executor of the will, and Franz has not been seen or heard from in a decade.

The play opens as Franz and his eccentric fiancée River, from Portland, arrive at the house and enter through a window. Toni has been at the house preparing for an estate sale and auction of their father's old belongings with her troubled teenage son Rhys. Initially apprehensive of Franz's sudden arrival, she reluctantly allows the couple to stay at the house. The next day, Bo and his wife Rachel arrive with their children: 13 year-old daughter Cassidy and the much younger son Ainsley.

As the group reconnect, unexpected items begin to be unpacked from boxes, such as jars containing body parts, but they are disregarded as being antiques from a prior owner. However, Ainsley is mistakenly given a photo album containing graphic imagery of lynchings, evoking panic from Rachel, who forbids Cassidy from viewing them.

The adults deliberate why the album would be there, as the siblings did not believe their father to be racist. Rachel, however, finds this plausible: she is Jewish, and at several points in her relationship with the father, he disrespected or ignored her.

Toni dismisses her accusation of the father's antisemitism. In the ensuing argument, Toni sarcastically refers to Rachel as both a "Shylock" and a "kike", leading Rachel to storm out. Toni defends her actions as maintaining the sanctity of their father's name.

Meanwhile, Bo reminds the group that they also inherited $500,000 worth of debt that the auction needs to pay off. He suspects that it won't because the land and belongings have a low value. Angry that the reunion seems only to capitalize on their father's death, Toni drives away.

That night, Cassidy comes downstairs to see River meditating on the photo album. She shows the younger girl the images. Cassidy is unsure how to feel about the pictures, but is quick to say that they could be sold on the internet at a decent price to collectors, due to their apparent historical value. Toni returns to the house drunk, and instructs Cassidy to place the pictures in her car.

After Cassidy goes out, River attempts to connect with Toni and reveals that she is pregnant with Franz's child, to the latter's chagrin. During their discussion, Cassidy sneaks back in with the photos and hides. Rhys arrives to sleep on the downstairs couch. Cassidy and Rhys later view the pictures together after Toni and River leave, and Rhys keeps them as Cassidy returns to bed. Franz comes downstairs as Rhys attempts to masturbate, but the uncle only sees the lynching photos. He awkwardly begins to explain why they're important to view.

The next morning, the family prepares to welcome prospective buyers, but Toni has canceled the auction out of spite. Bo reveals that his research has revealed that the album could be worth hundreds of thousands of dollars, so that it doesn't matter if the auction is held after all.

However, nobody is able to locate the images. Franz shows up wet and covered in mud after swimming in a local lake. He reveals that in an attempt to redeem himself to the family, he "baptized" himself in a nearby lake, bringing the photos with him and ruining them. Bo's ire enables Cassidy to reveal that she had been the one who invited Franz to the house (via Facebook) and not estate lawyers as previously thought. Rachel's concern with this illicit friendship turns to fury as Toni reveals that Franz had been estranged due to a prior drug addiction that led to Rhys entering rehab, and Franz's statutory rape of a 12 year-old girl who became pregnant.

River flees in disgust and a full brawl begins among the family. Just as things quell, Ainsley, who had been playfully running around with various artifacts all weekend, arrives in the room wearing a Klan hood he found in the patriarch's bedroom, to everyone's horror.

The next morning, Rachel is hurriedly leaving with Bo, and Franz claims to be working on mending his relationship with River. Toni declares that she is effectively dead to her relatives, and their selfishness in their relationships with her and the estate are not worth salvaging. After everyone leaves, the house begins to fall apart over years of disrepair.

== Characters ==
- Antoinette "Toni" Lafayette: the oldest sibling, late 40s/early 50s
- Rhys Thurston: Toni's son, late teens
- Beauregard "Bo" Lafayette: Toni's brother, late 40s/early 50s
- Rachael Kramer-Lafayette: Bo's wife, late 40s
- Cassidy "Cassie" Kramer-Lafayette: their daughter, early teens
- Ainsley Kramer-Lafayette: their son, a child
- Francois "Franz" Lafayette: brother of Toni and Bo, late 30s/early 40s
- River Rayner: Franz's fiancée, early 20s

== Production history ==
Jenkins conceived the play through participation with the Vineyard Arts Project and the Sundance Institute Theatre Lab beginning in 2011. The play was first performed at Actors Theatre of Louisville in the Humana Festival of New American Plays.

The play was next performed in Chicago at the Victory Gardens Theater and at the Woolly Mammoth Theatre Company in Washington D.C. in 2013.

Appropriate began previews Off-Broadway on February 25, 2014, in The Alice Griffin Jewel Box Theatre at the Pershing Square Signature Center, New York. It had its opening night on March 16, 2014, playing a limited run to April 6. Johanna Day was given the Obie Award for Distinguished Performance by an Actress for her performance.

The play premiered on the West Coast at Center Theatre Group in 2015.

Appropriate opened at the Donmar Warehouse in London August 22, 2019, following previews from August 16. It played a limited run to October 5.

On June 15, 2023, Second Stage Theater announced that it would produce Appropriate at the Hayes Theater on Broadway as part of its 2023–2024 season with Lila Neugebauer as the director. Previews began on November 29, 2023, with the official opening on December 18, 2023. The show extended for a second time, concluding its run at the Hayes on March 3, 2024. Appropriate transferred to the Belasco Theatre on March 25, 2024, and ran through June 30, 2024. The extended cast includes everyone except Elle Fanning, who was replaced by Ella Beatty, daughter of Warren Beatty and Annette Bening, making her Broadway debut.

== Original casts ==
Character	Louisville	Off-Broadway	Los Angeles	London	Broadway
Character	2013	2014	2015	2019	2023
Antoinette 'Toni' Lafayette	Jordan Baker	Johanna Day	Melora Hardin	Monica Dolan	Sarah Paulson
Franz Lafayette	Reese Madigan	Patch Darragh	Robert Beitzel	Edward Hogg	Michael Esper
River Rayner	Natalie Kuhn	Sonya Harum	Zarah Mahler	Tafline Steen	Elle Fanning
Rhys Thurston	David Rosenblatt	Mike Faist	Will Tranfo	Charles Furness	Graham Campbell
Rachael Kramer-Lafayette	Amy Lynn-Stewart	Maddie Corman	Missy Yager	Jaimi Barbakoff	Natalie Gold
Ainsley Kramer-Lafayette	Gabe Weible	Alex Dreier	Liam Askew; Alexander Rodriguez	Orlando Roddy; Oliver Savell	Everett Sobers; Lincoln Cohen
Bo Lafayette	Larry Bull	Michael Laurence	David Bishins	Steven Mackintosh	Corey Stoll
Cassidy Kramer-Lafayette	Lilli Stein	Izzy Hanson-Johnston	Grace Kaufman	Isabella Pappas	Alyssa Emily Marvin

== Accolades ==
=== 2023 Broadway Revival ===
Year	Award	Category	Nominee	Result	Ref.
2024	Tony Awards	Best Revival of a Play	Branden Jacobs-Jenkins	Won	
2024	Tony Awards	Best Actress in a Play	Sarah Paulson	Won	
2024	Tony Awards	Best Featured Actor in a Play	Corey Stoll	Nominated	
2024	Tony Awards	Best Direction of a Play	Lila Neugebauer	Nominated	
2024	Tony Awards	Best Scenic Design of a Play	dots	Nominated	
2024	Tony Awards	Best Costume Design of a Play	Dede Ayite	Nominated	
2024	Tony Awards	Best Lighting Design of a Play	Jane Cox	Won	
2024	Tony Awards	Best Sound Design of a Play	Will Pickens and Bray Poor	Nominated	
2024	Drama Desk Awards	Outstanding Revival of a Play		Won	
2024	Drama Desk Awards	Outstanding Lead Performance in a Play	Sarah Paulson	Won	
2024	Drama Desk Awards	Outstanding Featured Performance in a Play	Michael Esper	Nominated	
2024	Drama Desk Awards	Outstanding Director of a Play	Lila Neugebauer	Nominated	
2024	Drama Desk Awards	Outstanding Scenic Design of a Play	dots	Nominated	
2024	Drama Desk Awards	Outstanding Lighting Design for a Play	Jane Cox	Won	
2024	Drama Desk Awards	Outstanding Sound Design of a Play	Bray Poor and Will Pickens	Nominated	
2024	Drama League Awards	Outstanding Revival of a Play		Won	
2024	Drama League Awards	Distinguished Performance	Sarah Paulson	Won	
2024	Drama League Awards	Distinguished Performance	Corey Stoll	Nominated	
2024	Drama League Awards	Outstanding Direction of a Play	Lila Neugebauer	Nominated	
2024	Outer Critics Circle Awards	Outstanding Revival of a Play		Won	
2024	Outer Critics Circle Awards	Outstanding Lead Performer in a Broadway Play	Sarah Paulson	Nominated	
2024	Outer Critics Circle Awards	Outstanding Direction of a Play (Broadway of Off-Broadway)	Lila Neugebauer	Nominated	
2024	Outer Critics Circle Awards	Outstanding Scenic Design (Broadway or Off-Broadway)	dots	Nominated	
2024	Broadway.com Audience Choice Awards	Favorite Featured Actress in a Play	Elle Fanning	Won	
2024	Dorian Award	Outstanding Broadway Play Revival		Won	
2024	Dorian Award	Lead Performance in a Broadway Play	Sarah Paulson	Won	
2024	Dorian Award	Outstanding Featured Performance in a Broadway Play	Elle Fanning	Nominated	
2024	Dorian Award	Broadway Showstopper Award	Epilogue: The Plantation Decays	Nominated	
