= Nigel Levings =

Australian stage lighting designer

- Known for: Lighting design
- Awards: Tony Award for Best Lighting Design

Nigel Levings is an Australian stage lighting designer. He has twice won the Tony Award for Best Lighting Design, for the 1996 Broadway revival of The King and I and for the 2003 Broadway restaging of La bohème.

== Opera productions ==
- The Demon at the Bergen Festival and for Zurich Opera
- Billy Budd for the Welsh National Opera, Opera Australia, Canadian Opera Company and for the English National Opera
- Nabco for Opera Australia
- Woyzeck for Opera Australia
- Orfeo for Innsbruck Festwochen der Alten Musik and the Berlin State Opera
- A Midsummer Night's Dream for the 1994 Edinburgh Festival
- La Belle Ivette for the English National Opera
- Simon Boccanegra for the Royal Opera House, Washington National Opera and Dallas Opera
- Falstaff for Théâtre du Chalet
- Idomeneus, Turandot and The Barber of Seville for the Houston Grand Opera
- Queen of Spades for the Dallas Opera

== Broadway productions ==
- The King and I
- La bohème

== Awards and honors ==
Levings' design for La bohème won the Outer Critics Circle Award, the Drama Desk Award and the Tony Award for Best Lighting Design in 2003. It also won the Ovation Award in 2004. His design for the 1996 Broadway revival of The King and I won the Outer Critics Circle Award and the Tony Award for Best Lighting Design and was nominated for the Drama Desk Award. His lighting for Billy Budd won the Dora Mavor Moore Award for Outstanding Lighting Design in 2000.
