= Jack Knowles (lighting designer) =

British lighting designer

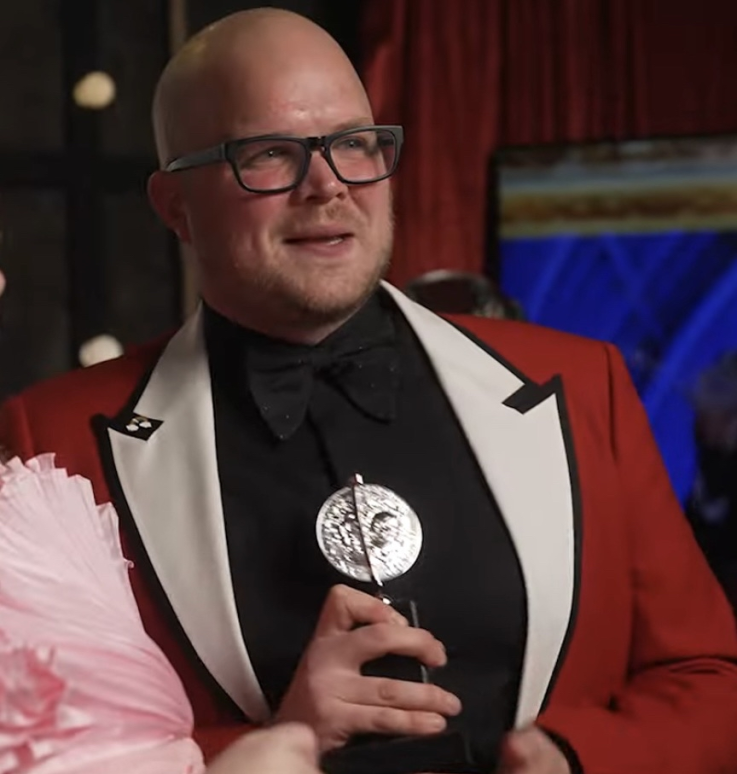
- Knowles in 2025
- Education: Royal Central School of Speech and Drama
- Occupation: Lighting designer
- Awards: Laurence Olivier Award for Best Lighting Design; Tony Award for Best Lighting Design of a Play; Tony Award for Best Lighting Design of a Musical

Jack Knowles is a British lighting designer. He has won two Tony Awards for his work on the musical Sunset Boulevard and the play Death of a Salesman. He also has been a recipient of a Laurence Olivier Award and two Drama Desk Awards.

== Early and personal life ==
Based in London, England, Knowles studied lighting design at the Royal Central School of Speech and Drama at the University of London, along with taking courses in art, drama, and German.

== Select stage credits ==
Year	Title	Role	Venue	Ref.
2017	Junkyard	Lighting Designer	West End, Rose Theatre	
2017	Barber Shop Chronicles	Lighting Designer	West End, Royal National Theatre	
2017	Committee... (A New Musical)	Lighting Designer	West End, Donmar Warehouse	
2018	Instructions for Correct Assembly	Lighting Designer	West End, Royal Court Theatre	
2018	Caroline, or Change	Lighting Designer	West End, Playhouse Theatre	
2019	Barber Shop Chronicles	Lighting Designer	Off-Broadway, Brooklyn Academy of Music	
2021	Caroline, or Change	Lighting Designer	Broadway, Studio 54	
2022	The Lion, the Witch and the Wardrobe	Lighting Designer	West End, Gillian Lynne Theatre	
2022	Best of Enemies	Lighting Designer	West End, Noël Coward Theatre	
2022	Sons of the Prophet	Lighting Designer	West End, Hampstead Theatre	
2023	Patriots	Lighting Designer	West End, Noël Coward Theatre	
2023	Good Vibrations: A Punk-Rock Musical	Lighting Designer	Off-Broadway, Irish Arts Center	
2023	Sunset Blvd.	Lighting Designer	West End, Savoy Theatre	
2024	Two Strangers (Carry a Cake Across New York)	Lighting Designer	West End,Criterion Theatre	
2024	Patriots	Lighting Designer	Broadway, Ethel Barrymore Theatre	
2024	Sunset Blvd.	Lighting Designer	Broadway, St. James Theatre	
2025	Every Brilliant Thing	Lighting Designer	West End, @sohoplace	
2025	The Lion, The Witch and the Wardrobe	Lighting Designer	West End, Sadler's Wells	
2025	The Unbelievers	Lighting Designer	West End, Royal Court Theatre	
2025	Two Strangers (Carry a Cake Across New York)	Lighting Designer	Broadway, Longacre Theatre	
2026	Every Brilliant Thing	Lighting Designer	Broadway, Hudson Theatre	
2026	Death of a Salesman	Lighting Designer	Broadway, Winter Garden Theatre	
2026	1536	Lighting Designer	West End, Ambassadors Theatre	
2026	Kimberly Akimbo	Lighting Designer	Off-West End, Hampstead Theatre	
2027	Two Strangers (Carry a Cake Across New York)	Lighting Designer	U.S. National Tour	

== Awards and nominations ==
Year	Award	Category	Work	Result	Ref.
2024	WhatsOnStage Award	Best Lighting Design	Sunset Boulevard	Won	
2024	Laurence Olivier Award	Best Lighting Design	Sunset Boulevard	Won	
2025	Tony Award	Best Lighting Design of a Musical	Sunset Boulevard	Won	
2025	Drama Desk Award	Outstanding Lighting Design of a Musical	Sunset Boulevard	Won	
2026	Tony Award	Best Lighting Design of a Play	Death of a Salesman	Won	
2026	Drama Desk Award	Outstanding Lighting Design of a Play	Death of a Salesman	Won	
2026	Outer Critics Circle Award	Outstanding Lighting Design	Death of a Salesman	Nominated	
