= Howell Binkley =

American lighting designer (1956–2020)

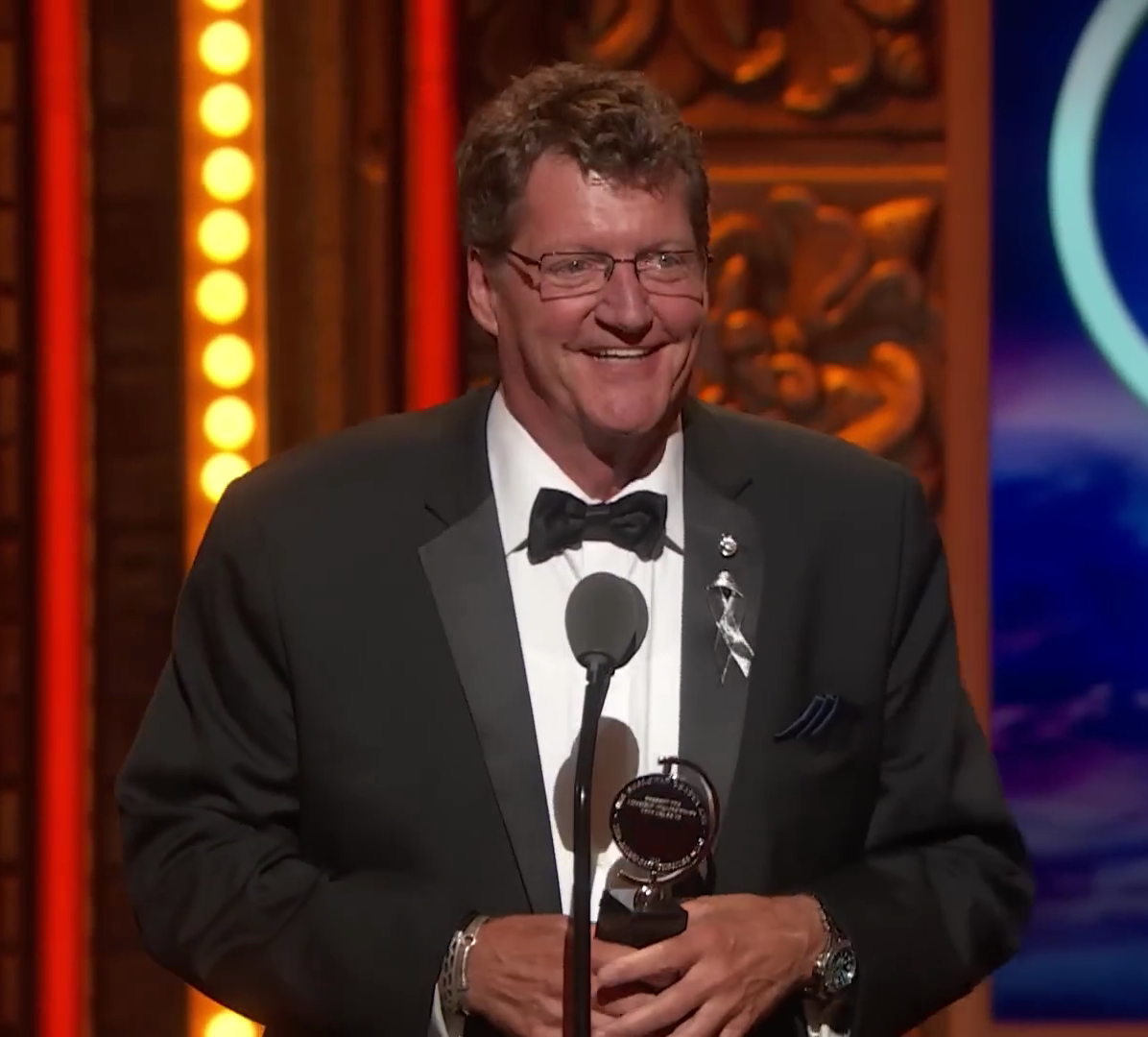
- Binkley in 2016
- Born: July 25, 1956; Winston-Salem, North Carolina
- Died: August 14, 2020 (aged 64); Jacksonville, North Carolina
- Resting place: God's Acre Cemetery
- Education: East Carolina University
- Notable work: "Caught"; Jersey Boys; Hamilton
- Movement: Modern dance; Musical theatre
- Website: howellbinkley.com

Howell Bagby Binkley (July 25, 1956 – August 14, 2020) was an American lighting designer in modern dance and musical theatre. He received the Tony Award for Best Lighting Design in a Musical for Jersey Boys in 2006, and again in 2016 for Hamilton.

== Early life and education ==
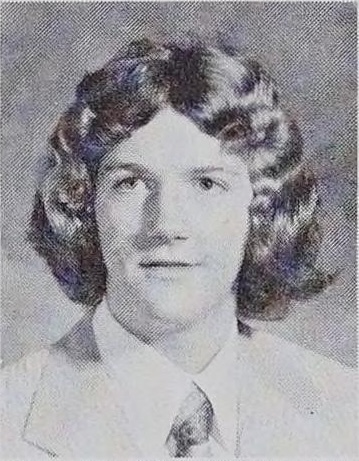
High-school yearbook photo, 1973

Binkley was born on July 25, 1956, in Winston-Salem, North Carolina. As a teenager, he became interested in theatre, participating in theatre summer camps for three years at the North Carolina School of the Arts. In addition, Binkley picked up jobs unloading trucks at the R. J. Reynolds Memorial Auditorium in Winston-Salem. He attended the adjacent to Richard J. Reynolds High School. He considered studying architecture in college, and applied to architecture programs at multiple state universities in North Carolina, but was not admitted to any of them.

Binkley instead enrolled in the theatre program at East Carolina University (ECU) in Greenville, North Carolina in 1974. Less than two years into his studies, he left college for two years to work at Opryland as a stagehand. Upon his return to ECU, he studied with The Acting Company during their residency at the university, and left college without graduating to take a full-time job with the company.

== Career ==
Binkley joined the Paul Taylor Dance Company as an associate under lighting designer Jennifer Tipton, who encouraged him to branch out and seek independent work. Binkley and David Parsons collaborated in 1982 to produce "Caught," a six-minute modern dance solo set to music by Robert Fripp. "Caught" depicts a soloist who is only illuminated while in midair, using strobe lights to create the illusion that the soloist is floating.

In 1985, Binkley moved to New York City, and co-founded the Parsons Dance Company. He remained the resident lighting designer of Parsons Dance for decades, creating over sixty designs for works by the company.

Binkley then went on to make his Broadway debut as designer for Kiss of the Spider Woman (1993), which earned him his first ever Tony Award nomination. From this success, he went on to design and light a plethora of major Broadway shows. In total, he designed 52 shows for Broadway and was nominated for a Tony Award nine times. Over the course of his work in Broadway, he became a frequent collaborator with Hal Prince and director Des McAnuff.

In addition to his work in New York City, Binkley worked across America, including national tours of Applause in 1996; tick, tick...BOOM! in 2003; and Flashdance in 2012. Alongside this, he worked at regional theatres such as La Jolla Playhouse, Shakespeare Theatre DC, Old Globe Theatre, Guthrie Theatre, Goodman Theatre, and Hartford Stage.

== Style ==
University of North Carolina School of the Arts lighting design professor Norman Coates described Binkley's technique in 2016 as "a dynamic use of color, and he cuts through that color with a purity of white light. ... The dynamic of being able to create the motion in light that matches the motion in the music and dance could be what makes his work so successful."

== Personal life ==
Binkley was married twice: firstly (in 1988) to Linda Kent, then to Joyce Storey. He had a daughter during a relationship with Anne King.

== Death and legacy ==
Binkley died on August 14, 2020, of lung cancer. He was 64.

Following his death, lighting equipment manufacturer Rosco Laboratories created a compilation of shows designed by Binkley, highlighting his use of gobos that create patterns in beams of light. Binkley's signature looks often utilized the abstract geometric patterns created by one specific Rosco gobo, catalog number R77760 "Internal Reflections." Rosco renamed the gobo "Binkley Reflections" in his honor in September 2020.

== Awards and nominations ==
Year	Production	Award	Category	Outcome
1993	Kiss of the Spider Woman	Tony Award	Best Lighting Design	Nominated
1993	Kiss of the Spider Woman	Olivier Award	Best Lighting Design	Won
1998	Parade	Drama Desk Award	Outstanding Lighting Design	Nominated
2000	The Full Monty	Drama Desk Award	Outstanding Lighting Design	Nominated
2003	Radiant Baby	Lucille Lortel Award	Outstanding Lighting Design	Nominated
2005	Jersey Boys	Tony Award	Best Lighting Design of a Musical	Won
2007	LoveMusik	Drama Desk Award	Outstanding Lighting Design	Won
2008	In The Heights	Tony Award	Best Lighting Design of a Musical	Nominated
2009	West Side Story	Tony Award	Best Lighting Design	Nominated
2011	How to Succeed in Business Without Really Trying	Tony Award	Best Lighting Design of a Musical	Nominated
2014	After Midnight	Tony Award	Best Lighting Design of a Musical	Nominated
2015	Hamilton	Lucille Lortel Award	Outstanding Lighting Design	Won
2015	Hamilton	Drama Desk Award	Outstanding Lighting Design	Nominated
2015	Hamilton	Hewes Design Award	Lighting Design	Won
2016	Hamilton	Tony Award	Best Lighting Design of a Musical	Won
2017	Come From Away	Tony Award	Best Lighting Design of a Musical	Nominated
2018	Hamilton	Olivier Award	Best Lighting Design	Won
2019	Ain't Too Proud	Tony Award	Best Lighting Design of a Musical	Nominated
