= Jon Clark (lighting designer) =

British lighting designer

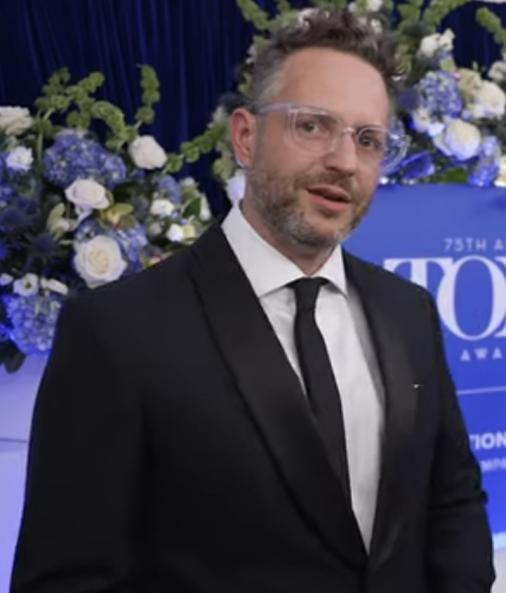
- Clark in 2022
- Occupation: Lighting designer

Jon Clark is a British lighting designer. He won a Tony Award in the category Best Lighting Design in a Play for The Lehman Trilogy on Broadway and an Olivier Award for The Inheritance in the West End. He has received further nominations for both awards. He won his second Tony Award for Best Lighting Design of a Play in 2025 for his work on Stranger Things: The First Shadow.
