= Jennifer Tipton =

American lighting designer

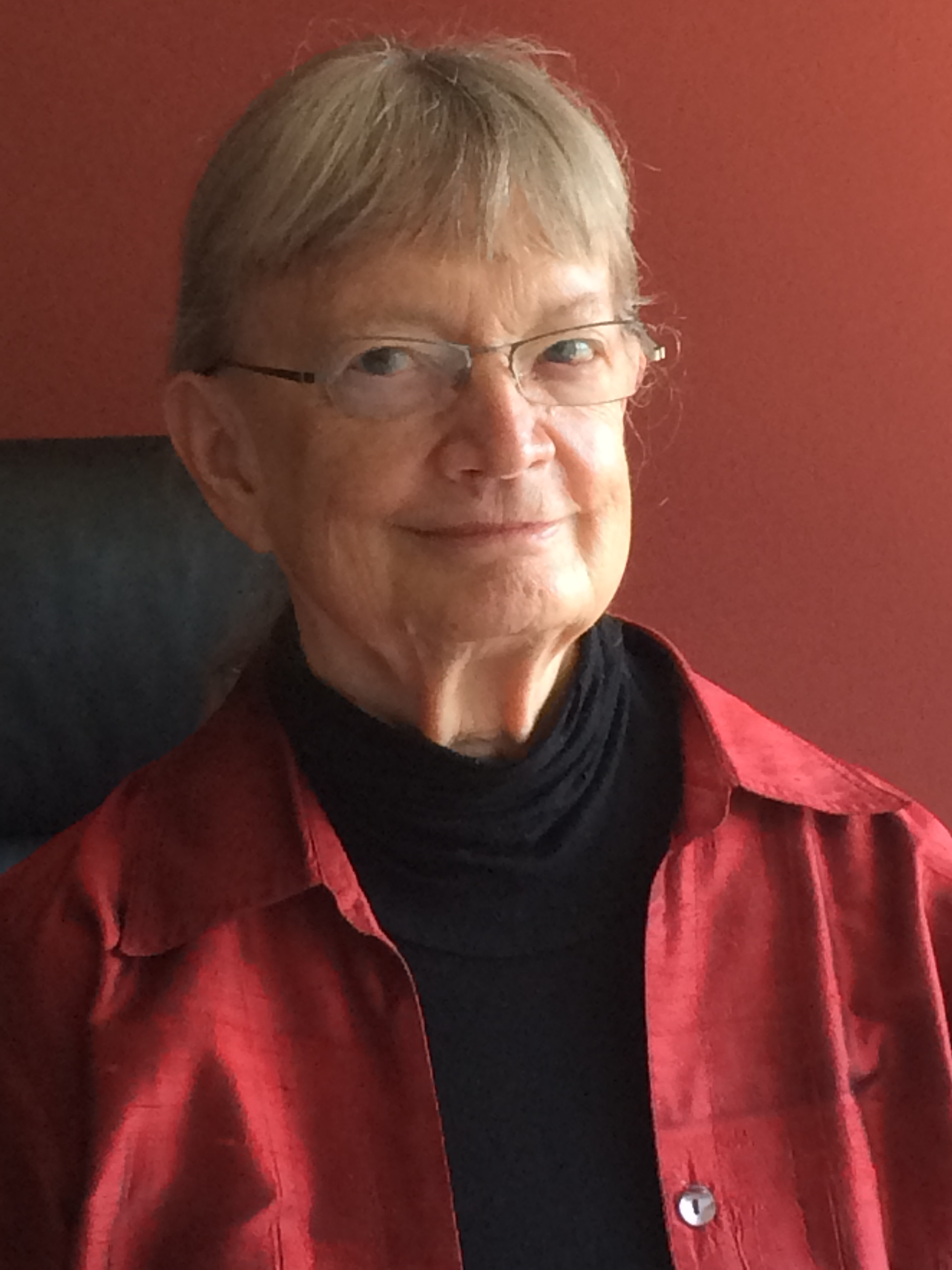
- Self-portrait, 2014
- Born: September 11, 1937 (age 89); Columbus, Ohio, U.S.
- Education: Thomas Skelton
- Alma mater: Cornell University
- Awards: The Dorothy and Lillian Gish Prize, MacArthur Fellows Program

Jennifer Tipton (born September 11, 1937) is an American lighting designer. She has designed for dance, theater, and opera. She is known for working on many productions of American Ballet Theatre.

== Life and career ==
Tipton was born in Columbus, Ohio. In 1958, she graduated from Cornell University. While performing as a dancer and rehearsal mistress, she noticed the importance of lighting, and studied dance lighting with Thomas Skelton, becoming his assistant.

Her first lighting design for Broadway was in 1969 for Our Town. Among her many awards and nominations, she won the 1977 Tony Award for Best Lighting Design for lighting Andrei Serban's production of The Cherry Orchard and the 1989 Tony Award for lighting for Jerome Robbins' Broadway. She also has won the Drama Desk Award for Outstanding Lighting Design twice.

She is known for her designs for dance and is the principal lighting designer for the Paul Taylor Dance Company. Choreographers she has worked with include Mikhail Baryshnikov, Jiří Kylián, Dana Reitz, Jerome Robbins, Paul Taylor, Twyla Tharp, Dan Wagoner, and Shen Wei.

Tipton has designed lighting on many plays for the American Ballet Theatre, starting with A Soldier's Tale (1971). Other productions she worked on include Amnon V’Tamar, Bach Partita, Le Baiser de la Fée, Ballet Imperial, Brief Fling, Bruch Violin Concerto No.1, and Bum’s Rush.

She designed the lighting for Baryshnikov's production of The Nutcracker, both for the stage and for television.

In 2001, Tipton was awarded The Dorothy and Lillian Gish Prize, one of the richest prizes in the arts, given annually to "a man or woman who has made an outstanding contribution to the beauty of the world and to mankind's enjoyment and understanding of life."

In January 2008, Tipton designed a large lighting display for the Experimental Media and Performing Arts Center at Rensselaer Polytechnic Institute in Troy, NY. It was her first non-theatrical installation.

In September 2008, she won a MacArthur Grant, for "pushing the visual boundaries of her art form with painterly lighting that evokes mood and sculpts movement in dance, drama, and oper".

She has served as Professor (Adjunct) of Design at the Yale School of Drama since 1981. Tipton trained many lighting designers, including Donald Holder, Christopher Akerlind, Michael Chybowski, M.L. Geiger and Robert Wierzel. Since 2006, Tony Award winner Howell Binkley assisted her and they collaborated for many years.

A 1991 biographical article in The New York Times stated: "There are perhaps a dozen lighting designers in the country who work steadily enough to support themselves by their art, and maybe half a dozen who are acclaimed and in demand. Among these is Jennifer Tipton, characterized most often for the impeccability of her taste and a certain precision and cerebral quality to her work -- which have earned her two Tony awards, among other prizes during her 25 years in the theater."

In a New York Times article, Tipton stated: "I feel that light is like music. In some abstract, emotional, noncerebral, nonliterary way, it makes us feel, it makes us see, it makes us think, all without knowing exactly how and why." She talks about how probably 99.9% of the audience isn't even really aware of it. A lot of thought is put into the lighting of a show, dance, performance, etc. and almost no one really appreciates it.

Tipton believes that the most important differences with designing lighting for dance and theater is that in dance, darkness is forbidden. You have to see dance to know what's going on but in theater, you just need to listen to it.

Politico described Tipton as seeing light "as a potent, versatile, mysterious, art form".

In 2018, she designed for To Kill a Mockingbird.

== Stage work and awards (selected) ==
- To Kill a Mockingbird - 2018 - Tony Award Best Lighting Design of a Play nominee
- A Doll's House, Part 2 - 2017 - Tony Award Best Lighting Design of a Play nominee
- The Testament of Mary - 2013 - Tony Award Best Lighting Design of a Play nominee
- Spectral Scriabin - 2010 - a "piano theatre" collaboration with pianist Eteri Andjaparidze
- La Bete - 1991 - Tony Award Best Lighting Design nominee
- Jerome Robbins' Broadway - 1989 - Tony Award Best Lighting Design winner and Drama Desk Award Outstanding Lighting Design winner
- Long Day's Journey Into Night - 1989 - Drama Desk Award Outstanding Lighting Design winner
- Worstward Ho - 1987 - Drama Desk Award Outstanding Lighting Design nominee
- Hamlet - 1986 - Drama Desk Award Outstanding Lighting Design nominee
- Whoopi Goldberg - 1985 - Drama Desk Award Outstanding Lighting Design nominee
- Sophisticated Ladies - 1981 - Tony Award Best Lighting Design nominee
- Lunch Hour - 1981 - Drama Desk Award Outstanding Lighting Design nominee
- Bosoms and Neglect - 1979
- The Cherry Orchard - 1977 - Tony Award Best Lighting Design winner and Drama Desk Award Outstanding Lighting Design winner
- For Colored Girls Who Have Considered Suicide When the Rainbow Is Enuf 1977 - Drama Desk Award Outstanding Lighting Design winner
