= David Hersey =

Lighting designer

- Born: November 30, 1939 (age 85); Rochester, New York
- Education: Oberlin College
- Occupation: Lighting designer
- Years active: 1980–present
- Spouse: Demetra Maraslis
- Children: 3

David Hersey (born November 30, 1939) is a lighting designer who has designed the lighting for over 250 plays, musicals, operas, and ballets. His work has been seen in most corners of the globe and his awards include the Tony Award for Best Lighting Design for Evita, Cats, and Les Misérables, the Drama Desk Award for Outstanding Lighting Design for Cats, Miss Saigon, and Equus, and the 1996 Laurence Olivier Award for Lighting Design.

== Early life and education ==
David Hersey was born in Rochester, New York, and attended Oberlin College.

== Career ==
Hersey has been the lighting designer for National Theatre, Royal Shakespeare Company and West End productions, as well as opera at the English National Opera (among others) and ballet at the Royal Ballet. He has been the lighting designer for Broadway productions, starting with Evita in 1980 through Equus in 2008.

Hersey has also been active in the world of theme parks in Florida and Italy, as well as lighting extravaganzas at The Mirage, Treasure Island Hotel and Casino, and Bellagio hotels in Las Vegas. He is the founder of DHA Designs, which concentrates on the design of specialist architectural lighting. For ten years he was lighting consultant to the Royal National Theatre and is a past chairman of the Association of Lighting Designers.

Most recently he has taken on the position of lighting designer for the play Fiddler on the roof done by CFT

== Personal life ==
In 1967 he moved to London, England. Married to Demetra Maraslis, his children are: a daughter Miranda Hersey, b. 1969 (from previous marriage); a son Demetri Alexander Hersey, b. 1978; and a daughter Ellen Katherine Hersey, born 1980.

== Awards and nominations ==
Year	Award	Category	Nominated work	Result
1979	Los Angeles Drama Critics' Circle Award		Evita	Nominated
1980	Tony Award	Best Lighting Design	Evita	Won
1982	Tony Award	Best Lighting Design	The Life and Adventures of Nicholas Nickleby	Nominated
1983	Drama Desk Award	Outstanding Lighting Design	Cats	Won
1983	Tony Award	Best Lighting Design	Cats	Won
1984	Dora Mavor Moore Award	Best Lighting Design	Cats	Won
1987	Tony Award	Best Lighting Design	Starlight Express	Nominated
1987	Tony Award	Best Lighting Design	Les Misérables	Won
1988	Drama Desk Award	Outstanding Lighting Design	Chess	Nominated
1988	Los Angeles Drama Critics' Circle Award		Les Misérables	Won
1989	Dora Mavor Moore Award	Best Lighting Design	Les Misérables	Won
1991	Drama Desk Award	Outstanding Lighting Design	Miss Saigon	Won
1991	Tony Award	Best Lighting Design	Miss Saigon	Nominated
1996	Laurence Olivier Award	Best Lighting Designer		Won
2002	Tony Award	Best Lighting Design	Oklahoma!	Nominated
2009	Tony Award	Best Lighting Design in a Musical	Equus	Nominated
2009	Drama Desk Award	Outstanding Lighting Design	Equus	Won
