= Christopher Akerlind =

American lighting designer

Christopher Akerlind (born May 1, 1962, in Hartford, Connecticut) is an American lighting designer for theatre, opera, and dance. He won the Tony Award for Best Lighting Design for Indecent. He also won the Tony Award for Best Lighting Design and the Drama Desk Award for Outstanding Lighting Design for Light in the Piazza and an Obie Award for sustained excellence for his work Off-Broadway.

He attended Boston University College of Fine Arts (1985) and the Yale School of Drama, training with Jennifer Tipton.

He was Head of Lighting Design and Director of the Design & Production Programs at the CalArts School of Theater.

He has designed many Broadway and Off-Broadway productions, working on both musicals and straight plays. He is noted for his work for director Lloyd Richards on the first productions of the plays of August Wilson, including The Piano Lesson (1990) and Seven Guitars (1996).

He was the Resident Lighting Designer for twelve years at the Opera Theatre of Saint Louis.

Akerlind was a Visiting Associate Professor and Director of Production at the University of Southern California School of the Theatre (now the School of Dramatic Arts) from 2007 to 2008, has guest taught at New York University, the University of Connecticut, Yale, and for the Broadway Lighting Master Classes.

== Work (selected) ==
- The Piano Lesson (1990)
- Mad Forest (1992) - Drama Desk Award nominee, Outstanding Lighting Design
- Shining Brow (1993)
- The Lights (1994) - Drama Desk Award nominee, Outstanding Lighting Design
- Seven Guitars (1996) - Tony Award nominee, Best Lighting Design
- The Tale of the Allergist's Wife (2000)
- Well (2004) - Lucille Lortel Award nomination
- The Light in the Piazza (2005)
- Belle Epoque (2005) - Drama Desk Award nominee, Outstanding Lighting Design; Lucille Lortel Award nomination
- Awake and Sing (2006) - Tony Award and Drama Desk Award nominee, Best Lighting Design of a Play
- 110 In The Shade (2007) - Tony Award nominee, Best Lighting Design of a Musical
- Top Girls (2008)
- Garden of Earthly Delights (2008) - Lucille Lortel Award win
- Chéri (2013)
- Rocky (2014)
- The Last Ship (2014)
- Waitress (2016)
