= Jules Fisher =

American lighting designer and producer (born 1937)

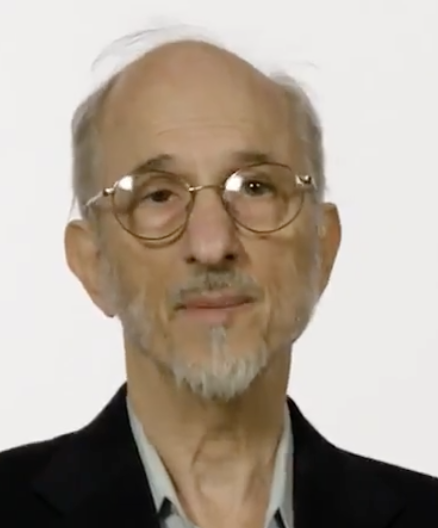
- Fisher in May 2018
- Born: November 12, 1937 (age 88); Norristown, Pennsylvania, U.S.
- Education: Carnegie Institute of Technology (BFA)
- Known for: Lighting design
- Spouse: Graciela Daniele
- Awards: Tony Award for Best Lighting Design (9x)

Jules Fisher (born November 12, 1937) is an American lighting designer and producer. He is credited with lighting designs for more than 300 productions over the course of his 60+ year career of Broadway and off-Broadway shows, as well extensive work in film, ballet, opera, television, and rock and roll concert tours. He has been nominated 24 times for Tony Awards (as a lighting designer), more than any other lighting designer, and won a record nine Tony Awards for Lighting Design.

== Biography ==
Fisher was born in Norristown, Pennsylvania, the son of Anne (Davidson) and Abraham Fisher, a retailer. He is a graduate of Carnegie Institute of Technology. He is married to choreographer-director Graciela Daniele. He has been in a professional partnership with lighting designer Peggy Eisenhauer since 1985, and they formed Third Eye Ltd, a firm specializing in entertainment and theatre lighting. He is also a principal in the theatre consulting firm Fisher Dachs Associates, architectural lighting firm Fisher Marantz Stone, and teaches at The New School. Fisher was awarded an Honorary Doctorate of Fine Arts degree from Carnegie Mellon University in May 2013.

== Stage work (selected) ==
- Spoon River Anthology (1963)
- Anyone Can Whistle (musical) (1964)
- High Spirits (1964)
- The Subject Was Roses (1964)
- Do I Hear a Waltz? (musical) (1965)
- Half a Sixpence (musical) (1965)
- Pickwick (musical) (1965)
- You Know I Can't Hear You When the Water's Running (1967)
- The Man in the Glass Booth (1968)
- The Only Game in Town (1968)
- Hair (1968, revival 1977)
- Jesus Christ Superstar (musical) (1971)
- Soon (1971)
- Pippin (1972)
- The Iceman Cometh (1973)
- Liza (Special) (1974)
- Chicago (1975)
- Beatlemania (1977)
- La Cage aux Folles (1983)

=== with Peggy Eisenhauer ===
- Song and Dance (Musical) (1985)
- Rags (1986)
- Legs Diamond (1988)
- Ragtime (1998)
- Gypsy (2003)
- School of Rock (2003)
- Assassins (2004)
- The Ritz (2007)
- 9 to 5 (2008)
- Lucky Guy (2013)
- Once on this Island (2017)
- Gary: A Sequel to Titus Andronicus (2019)
- Harmony (musical) (2023)
- Gypsy (musical) (2025)

== Concert work ==
Fisher has worked with many popular musicians on their concerts and tours including:

- The Rolling Stones
- Kiss
- David Bowie
- Parliament-Funkadelic
- The Who's Tommy
- Crosby, Stills and Nash
- Whitney Houston
- Simon & Garfunkel
- Barbra Streisand

== Film lighting ==
Fisher has designed theatrical lighting for many film features. Designs include:

- A Star is Born (1976)
- The Rose (1979)
- Can't Stop the Music (1980)
- The Birdcage (1996)
- Chicago (2002)
- The Producers (2005)
- Dreamgirls (2006)
- Enchanted (2007)
- Burlesque (2010)

Fisher can be seen as himself lighting a show in Bob Fosse's All That Jazz (1979).

== Tony Award wins ==
for Best Lighting Design:

- 1973 Pippin
- 1974 Ulysses in Nighttown
- 1978 Dancin'
- 1990 Grand Hotel
- 1991 The Will Rogers Follies
- 1992 Jelly's Last Jam
- 1996 Bring in 'da Noise, Bring in 'da Funk (shared with partner Peggy Eisenhauer)
- 2004 Assassins (shared with partner Peggy Eisenhauer)
- 2013 Lucky Guy (shared with partner Peggy Eisenhauer)

== Tony Award nominations ==
for Best Lighting Design:

- 1972 Jesus Christ Superstar
- 1976 Chicago
- 1978 Beatlemania
- 1978 Dancin' (Best Musical, as producer)
- 1984 La Cage aux Folles
- 1986 Song & Dance
- 1993 Angels in America: Millennium Approaches
- 1994 Angels in America: Perestroika
- 1998 Ragtime (shared with partner Peggy Eisenhauer)
- 2000 Marie Christine and The Wild Party (shared with partner Peggy Eisenhauer)
- 2001 Jane Eyre (shared with partner Peggy Eisenhauer)
- 2016 Shuffle Along, Or The Making of the Musical Sensation of 1921 and All That Followed (shared with partner Peggy Eisenhauer)
- 2018 The Iceman Cometh (shared with partner Peggy Eisenhauer)
- 2018 Once on this Island (shared with partner Peggy Eisenhauer)
- 2019 Gary: A Sequel to Titus Andronicus (shared with partner Peggy Eisenhauer)

== See also ==
- List of Tony Award records
