= Kevin Adams =

American theater lighting designer

- Born: June 26, 1962 (age 64); Pampa, Texas, U.S.
- Education: University of Texas, Austin (BFA); California Institute of the Arts (MFA)
- Partner: James Noone

Kevin Adams (born June 26, 1962) is an American theatrical lighting designer. He has earned four Tony Awards for lighting design.

== Biography ==
Adams grew up in Texas and attended the University of Texas where he received a B.F.A. in scenery design, then attended the California Institute of the Arts where he received a master's degree, also in scenic design. He toured with Rachel Rosenthal, a performance artist, for 5 years, and also worked as a set designer at various theaters and in film in California, before moving to New York.

In 2007, he received the Tony Award for Best Lighting Design of a Musical for Spring Awakening. In 2008 he received the Tony Award for Best Lighting Design of a Play and the Drama Desk Award for Outstanding Lighting Design for The 39 Steps. In 2010 he received his third Tony Award (for light design of a musical) for his work on "American Idiot". He won the 2014 Tony Award for Best Lighting Design of a Musical for his work on Hedwig and the Angry Inch. He received Tony nominations for his lighting of The Cher Show, SpongeBob SquarePants the Musical and Chess. Other productions include Funny Girl, Swept Away, A Beautiful Noise, Passing Strange, Next to Normal, the 2009 revival of Hair, Take Me Out, Everyday Rapture", solo shows for Anna Deavere Smith, Eve Ensler, Eric Bogosian and John Leguizamo, concerts for Audra McDonald, Patti Lupone, Sandra Bernhard and The Magnetic Fields. Adams has worked at many regional and off-Broadway theaters and operas, including: The Public Theater, Roundabout Theatre, Second Stage Theatre, Encores!, Williamstown Theatre Festival, Lincoln Center, Kennedy Center, Playwrights Horizons, P.S. 122, Steppenwolf Theatre, Donmar Warehouse, New York City Opera, Glimmerglass Opera, and Houston Grand Opera.

In 2009 he received two Tony nominations for lighting Hair and Next To Normal. In 2010, he was nominated for his work on American Idiot. 2002 he received an Obie Award for Sustained Excellence and in 1998 and 2007 he received Lucille Lortel Awards for Outstanding Lighting of an Off-Broadway production. He received the Henry Hewes Design Award in 2007 for lighting Spring Awakening and in 2010 for Hair and in 2011 for American Idiot.

His 1992 video about the 1991 gay bashing murder of Houstonian Paul Broussard, Can't Take That Away From Me, was internationally exhibited including the Margaret Mead Film Festival, American Film Institute and British Film Institute.

His archive is held at the Harry Ransom Center at The University of Texas at Austin.

Author of Electric Spectacle: Designing Color and Light for the Stage, published by Routledge, February 2027.
