= Rick Fisher (lighting designer) =

American lighting designer

- Born: Philadelphia, Pennsylvania, U.S.
- Known for: Lighting design
- Awards: Tony Award for Best Lighting Design; Drama Desk Award for Outstanding Lighting Design

Rick Fisher is an American lighting designer, known for his work with Stephen Daldry on Billy Elliot the Musical and An Inspector Calls. He is from Philadelphia, Pennsylvania and attended Dickinson College, but has been based in the UK for the last 30 years.

He has done the lighting design for many opera companies, including Covent Garden and New York City Opera. He has been designing for the Santa Fe Opera for seven seasons; for the 2007 season he did three productions.

Fisher received the Live Design Outstanding Designer of The Year in 2008. He is the chairman of the British Association of Lighting Designers.

== Selected stage credits ==
- Sunny Afternoon (2014 West End)
- Billy Elliot: The Musical (2005 West End, 2008 Broadway)
- Jerry Springer the Opera (2003 West End)
- Via Dolorosa (1999 Broadway)
- Matthew Bourne's Swan Lake (1995 West End, 1998 Broadway)
- The Threepenny Opera (1994 West End)
- Hysteria (1993 Royal Court Theatre)
- Machinal (1993, Royal National Theatre)
- An Inspector Calls (1992 West End, 1994 Broadway)
- Serious Money (1988 Broadway)

== Awards ==
- 2009 Tony Award for Best Lighting Design and Drama Desk Award for Outstanding Lighting Design for Billy Elliot the Musical (Broadway)
- 2008 Theatre Lighting Designer of the Year, LDI
- 2008 Helpmann Award for Best Lighting Design, Sydney Australia for Billy Elliot the Musical (Australia)
- 2005 Bronze Medal for Lighting Design: World Stage Design Expo, Toronto
- 2003 Gold Triga Prague Quadrennial: Member of British entry
- 2003 Garland Award: Cinderella, Ahmanson Theatre, Los Angeles
- 1998 Laurence Olivier Award for Lady in the Dark, Chips with Everything (Royal National Theatre)
- 1996 Ovation and Los Angeles Drama Critics Award: An Inspector Calls, Los Angeles
- 1995 Gold Medal Prague Quadrennial: Member of British Entry
- 1994 Tony Award and Drama Desk Awards for An Inspector Calls (Broadway)
- 1994 Laurence Olivier Award for Hysteria, Machinal, and Moonlight
