= Donald Holder =

American lighting designer

- Born: 1962 (age 63–64)
- Education: University of Maine (BS); Yale University (MFA)

Donald Holder is an American lighting designer in theatre, opera and dance based in New York. He was born in 1962. He has been nominated for fourteen Tony Awards, winning the 1998 Tony Award for Best Lighting Design as well as the Drama Desk Award for Outstanding Lighting Design for The Lion King. He won a second Tony in 2008 for the revival of South Pacific. His lighting design for Paradise Square has been nominated for a 2022 Tony Award for Best Lighting Design of a Musical. Additional Broadway credits include: Tootsie, Anastasia, Kiss Me Kate, Fiddler on the Roof, The Bridges of Madison County, She Loves Me, The Cherry Orchard, The King and I, Big Fish, Annie (2012 Broadway revival), Golden Boy, Spider-Man: Turn Off the Dark, Arcadia, The Motherfucker With The Hat, Promises, Promises, Les Liaisons Dangereuses, Radio Golf, The Little Dog Laughed, Movin' Out, The Times They Are a-Changin', A Streetcar Named Desire, Holiday, Cyrano de Bergerac, and Prelude to a Kiss. Off-Broadway credits include Jeffrey and The Most Fabulous Story Ever Told. He was the theatrical lighting designer for seasons one and two of the NBC-Universal television series Smash. Other television and film credits include: The Marvelous Mrs. Maisel, Spirited, and Oceans Eight

Holder studied forestry at the University of Maine, where he graduated from in 1980. He also worked for the Portland Stage Company in Maine. He holds a Masters of Fine Arts from the Yale School of Drama and is a student of Jennifer Tipton. He was the head of lighting design in the School of Theater at the California Institute of the Arts from 2006 to 2010, Head of Lighting Design at the Rutgers University Mason Gross School of the Arts from 2016 to 2025, and currently Head of Lighting Design at the David Geffen School of Drama at Yale. .

== Awards and nominations ==
Award nominations
Year	Production	Award	Category	Outcome
1997	Juan Darien	Tony Award	Best Lighting Design	Nominated
1997	Juan Darien	Drama Desk Award	Outstanding Lighting Design	Nominated
1998	The Lion King	Tony Award	Best Lighting Design	Won
1998	The Lion King	Drama Desk Award	Outstanding Lighting Design	Won
2003	Movin' Out	Tony Award	Best Lighting Design	Nominated
2003	Movin' Out	Drama Desk Award	Outstanding Lighting Design	Nominated
2004	The Violet Hour	Drama Desk Award	Outstanding Lighting Design	Nominated
2005	Gem of the Ocean	Tony Award	Best Lighting Design	Nominated
2005	Gem of the Ocean	Drama Desk Award	Outstanding Lighting Design	Nominated
2005	A Streetcar Named Desire	Tony Award	Best Lighting Design of a Play	Nominated
2008	Les Liaisons Dangereuses	Tony Award	Best Lighting Design of a Play	Nominated
2008	South Pacific	Tony Award	Best Lighting Design of a Musical	Won
2010	Ragtime	Tony Award	Best Lighting Design of a Musical	Nominated
2013	Golden Boy	Tony Award	Best Lighting Design of a Play	Nominated
2014	The Bridges of Madison County	Tony Award	Best Lighting Design of a Musical	Nominated
2015	The King and I	Tony Award	Best Lighting Design of a Musical	Nominated
2016	Oslo	Tony Award	Best Lighting Design of a Play	Nominated
2018	My Fair Lady	Tony Award	Best Lighting Design of a Musical	Nominated
2022	Paradise Square	Tony Award	Best Lighting Design of a Musical	Nominated
2026	Ragtime	Tony Award	Best Lighting Design of a Musical	Nominated
2026	Schmigadoon	Tony Award	Best Lighting Design of a Musical	Nominated
