= Peggy Eisenhauer =

American lighting designer

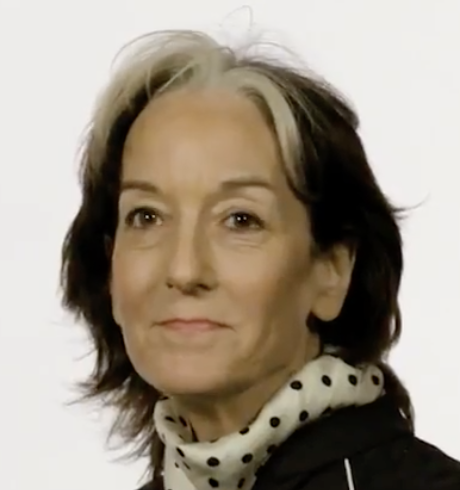
- Eisenhauer in May 2018
- Born: Nyack, New York, U.S.
- Alma mater: Carnegie Mellon University
- Occupation: Lighting designer
- Awards: 2013 Tony Award for Best Lighting Design (Lucky Guy); 2004 Tony Award for Best Lighting Design (Assassins)

Peggy Eisenhauer is an American lighting designer for both theatre and films. She has designed or co-designed some 41 Broadway productions and frequently collaborates with Jules Fisher.

== Career ==
Peggy Eisenhauer was raised in Nyack, New York. She attended Carnegie Mellon University, started working in New York and quickly became assistant to Jules Fisher, and eventually became his partner. Forming their company, Third Eye, their first project together was the 1985 Broadway musical Song and Dance. Their first joint film project was the film version of the musical Chicago.

== Major theatre productions ==
- Song and Dance (1985)
- Rags (1986)
- Grand Hotel (1989)
- The Will Rogers Follies (1991)
- My Favorite Year (1992)
- Angels in America: Millennium Approaches (1993)
- Victor/Victoria (1995)
- Bring in 'Da Noise, Bring in 'Da Funk (1996)
- Ragtime (1998)
- Cabaret (1998)
- Marie Christine (1999)
- The Wild Party (2000)
- Jane Eyre (2000)
- Elaine Stritch At Liberty (2002)
- Amour (2002)
- Gypsy (2003)
- Assassins (2004)
- Caroline, or Change (2004)
- Mario Cantone: Laugh Whore (2004)
- Chita Rivera: The Dancer's Life (2005)
- The Ritz (2007)
- 9 to 5 (2009)
- Let Me Down Easy (2009, Second Stage Theatre)
- Once on This Island (2017)
- The Iceman Cometh (2018)

== Theatre awards and nominations ==
- 2018 Drama Desk Award Outstanding Lighting Design for a Musical (Once on This Island, co-nominee)
- 2013 Tony Award for Best Lighting Design (Lucky Guy, winner)
- 2004 Tony Award for Best Lighting Design (Assassins, winner)
- 2004 Drama Desk Award for Outstanding Lighting Design (Assassins, winner)
- 2001 Tony Award for Best Lighting Design (Jane Eyre, nominee)
- 2000 Tony Award for Best Lighting Design (Marie Christine, nominee)
- 2000 Tony Award for Best Lighting Design (The Wild Party, nominee)
- 1998 Tony Award for Best Lighting Design (Ragtime, nominee)
- 1998 Tony Award for Best Lighting Design (Cabaret, nominee)
- 1998 Drama Desk Award for Outstanding Lighting Design (Ragtime, nominee)
- 1998 Drama Desk Award for Outstanding Lighting Design (Cabaret, nominee)
- 1996 Tony Award for Best Lighting Design (Bring in 'Da Noise, Bring in 'Da Funk, winner)
- 1996 Drama Desk Award for Outstanding Lighting Design (Bring in 'Da Noise, Bring in 'Da Funk, winner)

== Film credits ==
- Chicago (2002)
- The School of Rock (2003)
- The Stepford Wives (2004)
- The Producers (2005)
- Dreamgirls (2006)
- Enchanted (2007)
- Burlesque (2010)
- My Week with Marilyn (2011)
