= 68th Tony Awards =

2014 US theatrical awards ceremony

- Date: June 8, 2014
- Location: Radio City Music Hall, New York, New York
- Hosted by: Hugh Jackman

Highlights
- Most wins: A Gentleman's Guide to Love and Murder and Hedwig and the Angry Inch (4)
- Most nominations: A Gentleman's Guide to Love and Murder (10)
- Website: tonyawards.com

Television/radio coverage
- Network: CBS
- Viewership: 7.0 million
- Produced by: Ricky Kirshner; Glenn Weiss
- Directed by: Glenn Weiss

The 68th Annual Tony Awards were held June 8, 2014, to recognize achievement in Broadway productions during the 2013–14 season. The ceremony was held at Radio City Music Hall in New York City, and was televised live on CBS. Hugh Jackman was the host, his fourth time hosting. The 15 musical Tony Awards went to seven different musicals, and six plays shared the 11 play Tony Awards.

The nominations were announced on April 29, 2014 by Jonathan Groff and Lucy Liu. Audra McDonald won the Tony Award for Best Actress in a Play. In just her ninth Broadway engagement, McDonald established two records as the first actor to win six Tony Awards for acting and the first to win in all four categories, lead and featured in both a play and a musical. In its seventh Broadway incarnation, The Glass Menagerie won its first Tony Award (Lighting Design).

== Eligibility ==
Shows that opened on Broadway during the 2013–14 season before April 24, 2014, were eligible for consideration.

Original plays

- Act One
- All the Way
- Bronx Bombers
- Casa Valentina
- Mothers and Sons
- Outside Mullingar
- The Realistic Joneses
- The Snow Geese
- A Time to Kill
- The Velocity of Autumn

Original musicals

- After Midnight
- Aladdin
- Beautiful: The Carole King Musical
- Big Fish
- The Bridges of Madison County
- Bullets Over Broadway
- First Date
- A Gentleman's Guide to Love and Murder
- If/Then
- A Night with Janis Joplin
- Rocky the Musical
- Soul Doctor

Play revivals

- Betrayal
- The Cripple of Inishmaan
- The Glass Menagerie
- Lady Day at Emerson's Bar and Grill
- Macbeth
- Machinal
- No Man's Land
- Of Mice and Men
- A Raisin in the Sun
- Richard III
- Romeo and Juliet
- Twelfth Night
- Waiting for Godot
- The Winslow Boy

Musical revivals

- Cabaret
- Hedwig and the Angry Inch
- Les Misérables
- Violet

== Ceremony ==
During the opening sequence of the ceremony, Jackman hopped along to the song "Take Me to Broadway," in an homage to Bobby Van's hopping in the 1953 film Small Town Girl.

The ceremony included performances from the nominated musicals (both new and revival) as well as other current musicals. The performances include:

Neil Patrick Harris (who hosted the last 3 ceremonies) and the cast of Hedwig and the Angry Inch performing "Sugar Daddy," Sutton Foster with the cast of Violet performing a medley of "On My Way" and "Raise You Up," Alan Cumming and the cast of Cabaret performing "Wilkommen," and Idina Menzel performing "Always Starting Over" from If/Then.

From the other shows that were nominated either for Best Musical or Best Revival. Those performances include:

James Monroe Iglehart, Adam Jacobs, and the cast of Aladdin performing "Friend Like Me"; Ramin Karimloo and the cast of Les Misérables performing "One Day More"; Jessie Mueller and the cast of Beautiful: The Carole King Musical performing a medley of "Will You Still Love Me Tomorrow" and "I Feel The Earth Move" (with Carole King herself); Bryce Pinkham, Lisa O'Hare, and Lauren Worsham from A Gentleman's Guide to Love and Murder performing "I've Decided to Marry You"; the cast of Bullets Over Broadway performing "T'Aint Nobody's Business"; and Andy Karl and the cast of Rocky performing "Eye of the Tiger" and the Final Box Fight scene.

Additionally, Wicked performed to celebrate its 10th anniversary, with Christine Dwyer and Jenni Barber in a performance of "For Good"; Patti LaBelle, Gladys Knight and Fantasia performed with the cast of After Midnight; and Sting performed a song from his new musical The Last Ship. Jennifer Hudson sang from a new musical, Finding Neverland.

The finale included Jackman in a dance number with all the Tony Award winners on stage.

The presenters included:

- Kevin Bacon
- Matt Bomer
- Wayne Brady
- Zach Braff
- Kenneth Branagh
- Patricia Clarkson
- Bradley Cooper
- Alan Cumming
- Fran Drescher
- Clint Eastwood
- Emilio Estefan
- Gloria Estefan
- Vera Farmiga
- Tony Goldwyn
- Anna Gunn
- Maggie Gyllenhaal
- Ethan Hawke
- Carole King
- Zachary Levi
- Orlando Bloom
- Tina Fey
- Jonathan Groff
- LL Cool J
- Samuel L. Jackson
- Judith Light
- Lucy Liu
- Kate Mara
- Leighton Meester
- Audra McDonald
- Alessandro Nivola
- Zachary Quinto
- Emmy Rossum
- Rosie O'Donnell
- T.I.
- Patrick Wilson

=== New award ===
During this ceremony, a new award was announced by Zachary Quinto and Matt Bomer, the "Tony Honor for Excellence in Theatre Education", which is to be presented by Carnegie Mellon University and will "honor kindergarten through high school (K-12) theatre educators."

=== Television ratings ===
According to the preliminary numbers, the televised awards ceremony had 7.02 million viewers. The 2013 telecast had 7.24 million viewers.

== Winners and nominees ==
The nominees were announced on April 29, 2014. The winners are shown below.

Best Play	Best Musical
All the Way – Robert Schenkkan; Act One – James Lapine; Casa Valentina – Harvey Fierstein; Mothers and Sons – Terrence McNally; Outside Mullingar – John Patrick Shanley	A Gentleman's Guide to Love and Murder; After Midnight; Aladdin; Beautiful: The Carole King Musical
Best Revival of a Play	Best Revival of a Musical
A Raisin in the Sun; The Cripple of Inishmaan; The Glass Menagerie; Twelfth Night	Hedwig and the Angry Inch; Les Misérables; Violet
Best Performance by a Leading Actor in a Play	Best Performance by a Leading Actress in a Play
Bryan Cranston – All the Way as President Lyndon B. Johnson; Samuel Barnett – Twelfth Night as Viola; Chris O'Dowd – Of Mice and Men as Lennie Small; Mark Rylance – Richard III as Richard III; Tony Shalhoub – Act One as Older Moss Hart / Barnett Hart / George S. Kaufman	Audra McDonald – Lady Day at Emerson's Bar and Grill as Billie Holiday; Tyne Daly – Mothers and Sons as Katherine Gerard; LaTanya Richardson Jackson – A Raisin in the Sun as Lena Younger; Cherry Jones – The Glass Menagerie as Amanda Wingfield; Estelle Parsons – The Velocity of Autumn as Alexandra
Best Performance by a Leading Actor in a Musical	Best Performance by a Leading Actress in a Musical
Neil Patrick Harris – Hedwig and the Angry Inch as Hedwig; Ramin Karimloo – Les Misérables as Jean Valjean; Andy Karl – Rocky the Musical as Rocky Balboa; Jefferson Mays – A Gentleman's Guide to Love and Murder as the D'Ysquith family; Bryce Pinkham – A Gentleman's Guide to Love and Murder as Monty Navarro	Jessie Mueller – Beautiful: The Carole King Musical as Carole King; Mary Bridget Davies – A Night with Janis Joplin as Janis Joplin; Sutton Foster – Violet as Violet Karl; Idina Menzel – If/Then as Elizabeth Vaughn; Kelli O'Hara – The Bridges of Madison County as Francesca Johnson
Best Performance by a Featured Actor in a Play	Best Performance by a Featured Actress in a Play
Mark Rylance – Twelfth Night as Olivia; Reed Birney – Casa Valentina as Charlotte; Paul Chahidi – Twelfth Night as Maria; Stephen Fry – Twelfth Night as Malvolio; Brian J. Smith – The Glass Menagerie as Jim O'Connor	Sophie Okonedo – A Raisin in the Sun as Ruth Younger; Sarah Greene – The Cripple of Inishmaan as Helen McCormick; Celia Keenan-Bolger – The Glass Menagerie as Laura Wingfield; Anika Noni Rose – A Raisin in the Sun as Beneatha Younger; Mare Winningham – Casa Valentina as Rita
Best Performance by a Featured Actor in a Musical	Best Performance by a Featured Actress in a Musical
James Monroe Iglehart – Aladdin as the Genie; Danny Burstein – Cabaret as Herr Schultz; Nick Cordero – Bullets Over Broadway as Cheech; Joshua Henry – Violet as Flick; Jarrod Spector – Beautiful: The Carole King Musical as Barry Mann	Lena Hall – Hedwig and the Angry Inch as Yitzhak; Linda Emond – Cabaret as Fräulein Schneider; Anika Larsen – Beautiful: The Carole King Musical as Cynthia Weil; Adriane Lenox – After Midnight as Various Characters; Lauren Worsham – A Gentleman's Guide to Love and Murder as Phoebe D'Ysquith
Best Book of a Musical	Best Original Score (Music and/or Lyrics) Written for the Theatre
A Gentleman's Guide to Love and Murder – Robert L. Freedman; Aladdin – Chad Beguelin; Beautiful: The Carole King Musical – Douglas McGrath; Bullets Over Broadway – Woody Allen	The Bridges of Madison County – Jason Robert Brown (music and lyrics); Aladdin – Alan Menken (music), Howard Ashman (lyrics), Tim Rice (lyrics) and Chad Beguelin (lyrics); A Gentleman's Guide to Love and Murder – Steven Lutvak (music and lyrics) and Robert L. Freedman (lyrics); If/Then – Tom Kitt (music) and Brian Yorkey (lyrics)
Best Scenic Design of a Play	Best Scenic Design of a Musical
Beowulf Boritt – Act One; Bob Crowley – The Glass Menagerie; Es Devlin – Machinal; Christopher Oram – The Cripple of Inishmaan	Christopher Barreca – Rocky the Musical; Julian Crouch – Hedwig and the Angry Inch; Alexander Dodge – A Gentleman's Guide to Love and Murder; Santo Loquasto – Bullets Over Broadway
Best Costume Design of a Play	Best Costume Design of a Musical
Jenny Tiramani – Twelfth Night; Jane Greenwood – Act One; Michael Krass – Machinal; Rita Ryack – Casa Valentina	Linda Cho – A Gentleman's Guide to Love and Murder; William Ivey Long – Bullets Over Broadway; Arianne Phillips – Hedwig and the Angry Inch; Isabel Toledo – After Midnight
Best Lighting Design of a Play	Best Lighting Design of a Musical
Natasha Katz – The Glass Menagerie; Paule Constable – The Cripple of Inishmaan; Jane Cox – Machinal; Japhy Weideman – Of Mice and Men	Kevin Adams – Hedwig and the Angry Inch; Christopher Akerlind – Rocky the Musical; Howell Binkley – After Midnight; Donald Holder – The Bridges of Madison County
Best Sound Design of a Play	Best Sound Design of a Musical
Steve Canyon Kennedy – Lady Day at Emerson's Bar and Grill; Alex Baranowski – The Cripple of Inishmaan; Dan Moses Schreier – Act One; Matt Tierney – Machinal	Brian Ronan – Beautiful: The Carole King Musical; Peter Hylenski – After Midnight; Tim O'Heir – Hedwig and the Angry Inch; Mick Potter – Les Misérables
Best Direction of a Play	Best Direction of a Musical
Kenny Leon – A Raisin in the Sun; Tim Carroll – Twelfth Night; Michael Grandage – The Cripple of Inishmaan; John Tiffany – The Glass Menagerie	Darko Tresnjak – A Gentleman's Guide to Love and Murder; Warren Carlyle – After Midnight; Michael Mayer – Hedwig and the Angry Inch; Leigh Silverman – Violet
Best Choreography	Best Orchestrations
Warren Carlyle – After Midnight; Steven Hoggett and Kelly Devine – Rocky the Musical; Casey Nicholaw – Aladdin; Susan Stroman – Bullets Over Broadway	Jason Robert Brown – The Bridges of Madison County; Doug Besterman – Bullets Over Broadway; Steve Sidwell – Beautiful: The Carole King Musical; Jonathan Tunick – A Gentleman's Guide to Love and Murder

=== Awards and Nominations per Production ===
Production	Nominations	Awards
A Gentleman's Guide to Love and Murder	10	4
Hedwig and the Angry Inch	8	4
A Raisin in the Sun	5	3
All the Way	2	2
Beautiful: The Carole King Musical	7	2
Lady Day at Emerson's Bar and Grill	2	2
The Bridges of Madison County	4	2
Twelfth Night	7	2
After Midnight	7	1
The Glass Menagerie	7	1
Bullets Over Broadway	6	0
The Cripple of Inishmaan	6	0
Act One	5	1
Aladdin	5	1
Casa Valentina	4	0
Machinal	4	0
Rocky the Musical	4	1
Violet	4	0
Les Misérables	3	0
Cabaret	2	0
If/Then	2	0
Mothers and Sons	2	0
Of Mice and Men	2	0
Outside Mullingar	1	0
Richard III	1	0
A Night with Janis Joplin	1	0

=== Multiple wins ===
- 4: A Gentleman's Guide to Love and Murder, Hedwig and the Angry Inch
- 3: A Raisin in the Sun
- 2: All the Way, Beautiful: The Carole King Musical, Lady Day at Emerson's Bar and Grill, The Bridges of Madison County, Twelfth Night

=== Multiple nominations ===
- 10: A Gentleman's Guide to Love and Murder
- 8: Hedwig and the Angry Inch
- 7: After Midnight, Beautiful: The Carole King Musical, The Glass Menagerie, Twelfth Night
- 6: Bullets Over Broadway, The Cripple of Inishmaan
- 5: Act One, Aladdin, A Raisin in the Sun
- 4: The Bridges of Madison County, Casa Valentina, Machinal, Rocky the Musical, Violet
- 3: Les Misérables
- 2: All the Way, Cabaret, If/Then, Lady Day at Emerson's Bar and Grill, Mothers and Sons, Of Mice and Men

== Non-competitive awards ==
The Isabelle Stevenson Award was given to Rosie O’Donnell "for her commitment to arts education for New York City’s public school children." The Special Tony Award for Lifetime Achievement was awarded to Jane Greenwood "for her outstanding work in costume design and for her dedication to the theatre".

The award for Tony Honors for Excellence in the Theatre was awarded to Actors Fund president Joe Benincasa, photographer Joan Marcus and general manager Charlotte Wilcox.

The Regional Theatre Award was awarded to the Signature Theatre Company, New York City. This is the first time a New York-based theatre company has received this award, whose eligibility had been expanded to include New York City for the 2013–14 season.

== In Memoriam ==
- Mitch Leigh
- Sarah Marshall
- Sid Caesar
- Sheila MacRae
- Martin Gottfried
- Miller Wright
- James Gandolfini
- Phyllis Frelich
- William Dodds
- Chuck Patterson
- Julie Harris
- Kelly Garrett
- Faith Geer
- Ashton Springer
- Philip Seymour Hoffman
- Jane Connell
- Frank Gero
- Mickey Rooney
- David Rogers
- Shirley Herz
- Clayton Corzatte
- Mitchell Erickson
- Seth Popper
- Regina Resnik
- Leslie Lee
- Eydie Gorme
- Kathleen Raitt
- Michael Filerman
- Martin Gold
- Jacques LeSourd
- Anna Crouse
- Stephen Porter
- Nicholas Martin
- Paul Rogers
- Gene Feist
- Maya Angelou

== See also ==
- Drama Desk Awards
- 2014 Laurence Olivier Awards – equivalent awards for West End theatre productions
- Obie Award
- New York Drama Critics' Circle
- Theatre World Award
- Lucille Lortel Awards
