= Drama Desk Award for Outstanding Sound Design of a Play =

Drama Desk Award for Outstanding Sound Design
- Awarded for: Outstanding Sound Design in a Play
- Location: New York City
- Country: United States
- Presented by: Drama Desk
- First award: 2010
- Currently held by: Ryan Rumery for Stereophonic (2024)
- Website: dramadesk.org (defunct)

The Drama Desk Award for Outstanding Sound Design for a Play is an annual award presented by Drama Desk in recognition of achievements in theatre across collective Broadway, off-Broadway and off-off-Broadway productions in New York City.

The award was established in 1980, with the Drama Desk Award for Outstanding Sound Design being presented each year to any play or musical production. Starting in 2010, the singular award was replaced by separate play and musical categories.

== Winners and nominees ==
=== 2010s ===
Year	Designer	Production
2010
2010	Fitz Patton	When the Rain Stops Falling
2010	Dan Bianchi and Wes Shippee	Frankenstein
2010	Dale Bigall	Underground
2010	Adam Cork	ENRON
2010	Lindsay Jones	Top Secret: The Battle for the Pentagon Papers
2010	Elizabeth Rhodes	John Ball's In the Heat of the Night
2011
2011	Acme Sound Partners and Cricket S. Myers	Bengal Tiger at the Baghdad Zoo
2011	Acme Sound Partners	The Merchant of Venice
2011	Ian Dickinson	John Gabriel Borkman
2011	Brett Jarvis	Baby Universe
2011	Bray Poor	Wings
2011	Eric Shimelonis	The Hallway Trilogy
2012
2012	John Gromada	The Best Man
2012	Quentin Chiappetta	The Navigator
2012	Gregory Clarke	Misterman
2012	Gareth Fry	Richard III
2012	Stowe Nelson	Samuel and Alasdair: A Personal History of the Robot War
2012	Shane Rettig	She Kills Monsters
2013
2013	Mel Mercier	The Testament of Mary
2013	Ien DeNio	The Pilo Family Circus
2013	Steve Fontaine	Last Man Club
2013	Christian Frederickson	Through the Yellow Hour
2013	Lindsay Jones	Wild With Happy
2013	Fergus O'Hare	Macbeth
2014
2014	Matt Tierney	Machinal
2014	M.L. Dogg	The Open House
2014	Katie Down	The Golden Dragon
2014	Paul James Prendergast	All the Way
2014	Dan Moses Schreier	Act One
2014	Christopher Shutt	Love and Information
2015
2015	Ian Dickinson (for Autograph)	The Curious Incident of the Dog in the Night-Time
2015	Nathan Davis	The Other Mozart
2015	Ien Denio	Deliverance
2015	Gareth Fry	Let the Right One In
2015	John Gromada	Lives of the Saints (an anthology of short plays by David Ives)
2015	Matt Tierney	Our Lady of Kibeho
2016
2016	Fitz Patton	The Humans
2016	Fitz Patton	An Act of God
2016	Miles Polaski	Fulfillment
2016	Bray Poor	John
2016	Ryan Rumery	Empanada Loca
2017
2017	Gareth Fry and Pete Malkin	The Encounter
2017	Mikhail Fiksel	A Life
2017	Brian Quijada	Where Did We Sit on the Bus?
2017	Leon Rothenberg	Notes from the Field
2017	Jane Shaw	Men on Boats
2018
2018	Gareth Fry	Harry Potter and the Cursed Child
2018	Brendan Aanes	Balls
2018	Tom Gibbons	1984
2018	Tom Gibbons	People, Places and Things
2018	Stefan Gregory	Yerma
2018	Palmer Hefferan	Today is My Birthday
2019
2019	Nick Powell	The Ferryman
2019	Tyler Kieffer	Plano
2019	Fitz Patton	Choir Boy
2019	Jane Shaw	I Was Most Alive with You
2019	Mikaal Sulaiman	Fairview

=== 2020s ===
Year	Designer	Production
2020
2020	Paul Arditti and Christopher Reid	The Inheritance
2020	Justin Ellington	Heroes of the Fourth Turning
2020	Mikhail Fiksel	Dana H.
2020	Palmer Hefferan	Fefu and Her Friends
2020	Lee Kinney and Sanae Yamada	Is This A Room
2021	No awards: New York theatres shuttered, March 2020 to September 2021, due to the COVID-19 pandemic in New York City	
2022
2022	Ben and Max Ringham	Cyrano de Bergerac
2022	Tyler Kieffer	Seven Deadly Sins
2022	Hidenori Nakajo and Ryan Rumery	Autumn Royal
2022	Mikaal Sulaiman	Sanctuary City
2022	Lee Kinney	Selling Kabul
2023
2023	Ben & Max Ringham	A Doll's House
2023	Justin Ellington	Ohio State Murders
2023	Tom Gibbons	Hamlet
2023	Josh Anio Grigg	Love
2023	Lee Kinney & Daniel Kluger	You Will Get Sick
2023	Mikaal Sulaiman	Fat Ham
2024
2024	Ryan Rumery	Stereophonic
2024	Adam Cork	The Hunt
2024	Tom Gibbons	Grey House
2024	Palmer Hefferan	The Comeuppance
2024	Bray Poor and Will Pickens	Appropriate
2025	Paul Arditti	Stranger Things: The First Shadow
2025	Johnny Gasper	Two Sisters Find a Box of Lesbian Erotica in the Woods
2025	Matt Otto	All of Me
2025	Bray Poor	Glass. Kill. What If If Only. Imp.
2025	Clemence Williams	The Picture of Dorian Gray
2025	Fan Zhang	Good Bones

== See also ==
- Laurence Olivier Award for Best Sound Design
- Tony Award for Best Sound Design
