= Tony Award for Best Sound Design =

American theatre award for Broadway sound design

The Tony Awards for Best Sound Design of a Play and Best Sound Design of a Musical recognize excellence in sound design for Broadway theatre. They were first given in the 2007–2008 season. In 2014, the Tony Awards Administration Committee announced that starting with the 2014–2015 season the Tony Awards for Best Sound Design of a Play and of a Musical would be eliminated, but that they would consider awarding "a special Tony award for certain productions that have excelled in this particular design realm". This resulted in considerable industry backlash, including thousands of signatures on a petition and a viral social media campaign by sound designer John Gromada, #TonyCanYouHearMe, and was a catalyst for the formation in 2014 of the Theatrical Sound Designers and Composers Association, to protest for its reinstatement. In 2017, the committee presented a Special Tony Award to Gareth Fry and Pete Malkin for their sound design of Complicité's The Encounter. In 2017, the committee announced that the two Sound Design awards would again be presented starting in the 2017–2018 season.

== List of winners and nominees ==
=== 2000s ===
Year	Production	Nominees
2008 (62nd)	Sound Design in a Play	
2008 (62nd)	The 39 Steps	Mic Pool
2008 (62nd)	Boeing-Boeing	Simon Baker
2008 (62nd)	Macbeth	Adam Cork
2008 (62nd)	Sound Design in a Musical	
2008 (62nd)	Rodgers & Hammerstein's South Pacific	Scott Lehrer
2008 (62nd)	Gypsy	Dan Moses Schreier
2008 (62nd)	In the Heights	Acme Sound Partners
2008 (62nd)	Sunday in the Park with George	Sebastian Frost
2008 (62nd)	Rock 'n' Roll	Ian Dickinson
2009 (63rd)	Sound Design in a Play	
2009 (63rd)	Equus	Gregory Clarke
2009 (63rd)	Exit the King	Russell Goldsmith
2009 (63rd)	Joe Turner's Come and Gone	Scott Lehrer and Leon Rothenberg
2009 (63rd)	Mary Stuart	Paul Arditti
2009 (63rd)	Sound Design in a Musical	
2009 (63rd)	Billy Elliot the Musical	Paul Arditti
2009 (63rd)	Hair	Acme Sound Partners
2009 (63rd)	Next to Normal	Brian Ronan
2009 (63rd)	Rock of Ages	Peter Hylenski

=== 2010s ===
Year	Production	Nominees
2010 (64th)	Sound Design in a Play	
2010 (64th)	Red	Adam Cork
2010 (64th)	Enron	Adam Cork
2010 (64th)	Fences	Acme Sound Partners
2010 (64th)	A View from the Bridge	Scott Lehrer
2010 (64th)	Sound Design in a Musical	
2010 (64th)	Fela!	Robert Kaplowitz
2010 (64th)	La Cage aux Folles	Jonathan Deans
2010 (64th)	A Little Night Music	Dan Moses Schreier and Gareth Owen
2010 (64th)	Sondheim on Sondheim	Dan Moses Schreier
2011 (65th)	Sound Design in a Play	
2011 (65th)	War Horse	Christopher Shutt
2011 (65th)	Bengal Tiger at the Baghdad Zoo	Acme Sound Partners and Cricket S. Myers
2011 (65th)	Brief Encounter	Simon Baker
2011 (65th)	Jerusalem	Ian Dickinson
2011 (65th)	Sound Design in a Musical	
2011 (65th)	The Book of Mormon	Brian Ronan
2011 (65th)	Anything Goes	Brian Ronan
2011 (65th)	Catch Me If You Can	Steve Canyon Kennedy
2011 (65th)	The Scottsboro Boys	Peter Hylenski
2012 (66th)	Sound Design in a Play	
2012 (66th)	Peter and the Starcatcher	Darron L. West
2012 (66th)	Death of a Salesman	Scott Lehrer
2012 (66th)	End of the Rainbow	Gareth Owen
2012 (66th)	'One Man, Two Guvnors	Paul Arditti
2012 (66th)	Sound Design in a Musical	
2012 (66th)	Once	Clive Goodwin
2012 (66th)	Follies	Kai Harada
2012 (66th)	Nice Work If You Can Get It	Brian Ronan
2012 (66th)	Porgy and Bess	Acme Sound Partners
2013 (67th)	Sound Design in a Play	
2013 (67th)	The Nance	Leon Rothenberg
2013 (67th)	Golden Boy	Peter John Still and Marc Salzberg
2013 (67th)	The Testament of Mary	Mel Mercier
2013 (67th)	The Trip to Bountiful	John Gromada
2013 (67th)	Sound Design in a Musical	
2013 (67th)	Kinky Boots	John Shivers
2013 (67th)	Motown: The Musical	Peter Hylenski
2013 (67th)	Pippin	Jonathan Deans and Garth Helm
2013 (67th)	Rodgers + Hammerstein's Cinderella	Nevin Steinberg
2014 (68th)	Sound Design in a Play	
2014 (68th)	Lady Day at Emerson's Bar and Grill	Steve Canyon Kennedy
2014 (68th)	Act One	Dan Moses Schreier
2014 (68th)	The Cripple of Inishmaan	Alex Baranowski
2014 (68th)	Machinal	Matt Tierney
2014 (68th)	Sound Design in a Musical	
2014 (68th)	Beautiful: The Carole King Musical	Brian Ronan
2014 (68th)	After Midnight	Peter Hylenski
2014 (68th)	Hedwig and the Angry Inch	Tim O'Heir
2014 (68th)	Les Misérables	Mick Potter
2018 (72nd)	Sound Design in a Play	
2018 (72nd)	Harry Potter and the Cursed Child	Gareth Fry
2018 (72nd)	Angels in America	Ian Dickinson
2018 (72nd)	The Iceman Cometh	Dan Moses Schreier
2018 (72nd)	1984	Tom Gibbons
2018 (72nd)	Travesties	Adam Cork
2018 (72nd)	Sound Design in a Musical	
2018 (72nd)	The Band's Visit	Kai Harada
2018 (72nd)	Carousel	Scott Lehrer
2018 (72nd)	Mean Girls	Brian Ronan
2018 (72nd)	Once on This Island	Peter Hylenski
2018 (72nd)	SpongeBob SquarePants	Mike Dobson and Walter Trarbach
2019 (73rd)	Sound Design in a Play	
2019 (73rd)	Choir Boy	Fitz Patton
2019 (73rd)	The Ferryman	Nick Powell
2019 (73rd)	Ink	Adam Cork
2019 (73rd)	Network	Eric Sleichim
2019 (73rd)	To Kill a Mockingbird	Scott Lehrer
2019 (73rd)	Sound Design in a Musical	
2019 (73rd)	Hadestown	Nevin Steinberg and Jessica Paz
2019 (73rd)	Ain’t Too Proud	Steve Canyon Kennedy
2019 (73rd)	Beetlejuice	Peter Hylenski
2019 (73rd)	King Kong	Peter Hylenski
2019 (73rd)	Oklahoma!	Drew Levy

=== 2020s ===
Year	Production	Nominees
2020 (74th)	Sound Design in a Play	
2020 (74th)	A Christmas Carol	Simon Baker
2020 (74th)	The Inheritance	Paul Arditti and Christopher Reid
2020 (74th)	Sea Wall/A Life	Daniel Kluger
2020 (74th)	Slave Play	Lindsay Jones
2020 (74th)	The Sound Inside	Daniel Kluger
2020 (74th)	Sound Design in a Musical	
2020 (74th)	Moulin Rouge! The Musical	Peter Hylenski
2020 (74th)	Jagged Little Pill	Jonathan Deans
2020 (74th)	Tina: The Tina Turner Musical	Nevin Steinberg
2022 (75th)	Sound Design in a Play	
2022 (75th)	Dana H.	Mikhail Fiksel
2022 (75th)	for colored girls who have considered suicide / when the rainbow is enuf	Justin Ellington
2022 (75th)	The Lehman Trilogy	Dominic Bilkey and Nick Powell
2022 (75th)	Macbeth	Mikaal Sulaiman
2022 (75th)	The Skin of Our Teeth	Palmer Hefferan
2022 (75th)	Sound Design in a Musical	
2022 (75th)	MJ	Gareth Owen
2022 (75th)	Company	Ian Dickinson for Autograph
2022 (75th)	Girl from the North Country	Simon Baker
2022 (75th)	Six	Paul Gatehouse
2022 (75th)	A Strange Loop	Drew Levy
2023 (76th)	Sound Design in a Play	
2023 (76th)	Life of Pi	Carolyn Downing
2023 (76th)	Ain't No Mo'	Jonathan Deans and Taylor J. Williams
2023 (76th)	A Christmas Carol	Joshua D. Reid
2023 (76th)	A Doll's House	Ben Ringham and Max Ringham
2023 (76th)	Prima Facie	Ben Ringham and Max Ringham
2023 (76th)	Sound Design in a Musical	
2023 (76th)	Sweeney Todd: The Demon Barber of Fleet Street	Nevin Steinberg
2023 (76th)	& Juliet	Gareth Owen
2023 (76th)	Into the Woods	Scott Lehrer and Alex Neumann
2023 (76th)	New York, New York	Kai Harada
2023 (76th)	Shucked	John Shivers
2024 (77th)	Sound Design in a Play	
2024 (77th)	Stereophonic	Ryan Rumery
2024 (77th)	Appropriate	Will Pickens and Bray Poor
2024 (77th)	Grey House	Tom Gibbons
2024 (77th)	Jaja's African Hair Braiding	Stefania Bulbarella and Justin Ellington
2024 (77th)	Mary Jane	Leah Gelpe
2024 (77th)	Sound Design in a Musical	
2024 (77th)	The Outsiders	Cody Spencer
2024 (77th)	Cabaret at the Kit Kat Club	Nick Lidster for Autograph
2024 (77th)	Hell's Kitchen	Gareth Owen
2024 (77th)	Here Lies Love	M. L. Dogg and Cody Spencer
2024 (77th)	Merrily We Roll Along	Kai Harada
2025 (78th)	Sound Design in a Play	
2025 (78th)	Stranger Things: The First Shadow	Paul Arditti
2025 (78th)	Good Night, and Good Luck	Daniel Kluger
2025 (78th)	The Hills of California	Nick Powell
2025 (78th)	John Proctor Is the Villain	Palmer Hefferan
2025 (78th)	The Picture of Dorian Gray	Clemence Williams
2025 (78th)	Sound Design in a Musical	
2025 (78th)	Buena Vista Social Club	Jonathan Deans
2025 (78th)	Floyd Collins	Dan Moses Schreier
2025 (78th)	Just In Time	Peter Hylenski
2025 (78th)	Maybe Happy Ending	Peter Hylenski
2025 (78th)	Sunset Blvd.	Adam Fisher
2026 (79th)	Sound Design in a Play	
2026 (79th)	Death of a Salesman	Mikaal Sulaiman
2026 (79th)	Bug	Josh Schmidt
2026 (79th)	The Fear of 13	Lee Kinney
2026 (79th)	Joe Turner's Come and Gone	Justin Ellington
2026 (79th)	Oedipus	Tom Gibbons
2026 (79th)	Sound Design in a Musical	
2026 (79th)	Ragtime	Kai Harada
2026 (79th)	Cats: The Jellicle Ball	Kai Harada
2026 (79th)	The Lost Boys	Adam Fisher
2026 (79th)	The Rocky Horror Show	Brian Ronan
2026 (79th)	Schmigadoon!	Walter Trarbach

== Multiple wins ==
2 Wins

- Gareth Fry
- Kai Harada
- Brian Ronan
- Nevin Steinberg

== Multiple nominations ==
10 nominations

- Peter Hylenski

7 nominations

- Scott Lehrer

6 nominations

- Kai Harada
- Brian Ronan
- Dan Moses Schreier

5 nominations

- Acme Sound Partners
- Paul Arditti
- Jonathan Deans
- Gareth Owen

4 nominations

- Simon Baker
- Adam Cork
- Ian Dickinson
- Nevin Steinberg

3 nominations

- Steve Canyon Kennedy
- Justin Ellington
- Tom Gibbons
- Daniel Kluger
- Nick Powell

2 nominations

- Adam Fisher
- Palmer Hefferan
- Drew Levy
- Ben Ringham
- Max Ringham
- Leon Rothenberg
- John Shivers
- Cody Spencer
- Mikaal Sulaiman
- Walter Trarbach

=== Historic nominations & wins ===
2011: Acme Sound Partners and Cricket S. Myers – Bengal Tiger at the Baghdad Zoo

- Cricket S. Myers is the first woman to receive a Tony nomination for Sound Design of a Play.

2019: Nevin Steinberg and Jessica Paz – Hadestown

- Jessica Paz is the first woman to receive a Tony nomination for Sound Design of a Musical and the first woman to win a Tony Award for Sound Design.

== See also ==
- Drama Desk Award for Outstanding Sound Design
- Laurence Olivier Award for Best Sound Design
- List of Tony Award-nominated productions
