= Acme Sound Partners =

Acme Sound Partners was a company whose staff worked as sound designers for theater.

== History ==
The company was founded by Nevin Steinberg, Tom Clark, and Mark Menard in 2000.

== Awards ==
Acme Sound Partners received nominations for the Tony Award for Best Sound Design in five consecutive years, from 2008 through 2012.

They won the Drama Desk Award for Outstanding Sound Design in 2003 for La bohème.

Acme Sound Partners and Cricket S. Myers won the Drama Desk Award for Outstanding Sound Design in a Play, one of two successor awards split from the Drama Desk Award for Outstanding Sound Design, in 2011 for Bengal Tiger at the Baghdad Zoo.

The company won a Drama Desk Award for Outstanding Sound Design in a Musical, the other successor to the Drama Desk Award for Outstanding Sound Design, in 2010 for Ragtime, and in 2012 for Porgy and Bess.
