= Laurence Olivier Award for Best Sound Design =

Annual award for London theatre

- Awarded for: Best Sound Design
- Location: England
- Presented by: Society of London Theatre
- First award: 2004
- Currently held by: Giles Thomas for Kenrex (2026)
- Website: officiallondontheatre.com/olivier-awards/

The Laurence Olivier Award for Best Sound Design is an annual award presented by the Society of London Theatre in recognition of the "world-class status of London theatre." The awards were established as the Society of West End Theatre Awards in 1976, and renamed in 1984 in honour of English actor and director Laurence Olivier.

This award was introduced in 2004, 13 years after the 1991 introduction of individual awards for Best Set Design, Best Costume Design and Best Lighting Design.

== Winners and nominees ==
=== 2000s ===
Year	Designer	Production
2004
2004	Mike Walker	Jerry Springer
2004	Paul Arditti	The Pillowman
2004	Peter Hylenski	Ragtime
2004	Nick Lidster	Pacific Overtures
2005
2005	Mick Potter	The Woman in White
2005	Paul Arditti	Festen
2005	Adam Cork	Suddenly, Last Summer
2006
2006	Paul Arditti	Billy Elliot
2006	Terry Jardine and Chris Full	Guys and Dolls
2006	Christopher Shutt	Coram Boy
2007
2007	Gareth Fry	Waves
2007	Ian Dickinson	Rock 'n' Roll
2007	Mic Pool	The 39 Steps
2008
2008	Paul Arditti	Saint Joan
2008	Simon Baker	The Lord of the Rings
2008	Terry Jardine and Nick Lidster	Parade
2008	Steve C. Kennedy	Hairspray
2008	Christopher Shutt	War Horse
2009
2009	Gareth Fry	Black Watch
2009	Simon Baker	Brief Encounter
2009	Steve Canyon Kennedy	Jersey Boys
2009	Christopher Shutt, Max Ringham and Ben Ringham	Piaf

=== 2010s ===
Year	Designer	Production
2010
2010	Brian Ronan	Spring Awakening
2010	Andrew Bruce and Nick Lidster	Mother Courage and Her Children
2010	Ian Dickinson	Jerusalem
2010	Christopher Shutt	Every Good Boy Deserves Favour
2011
2011	Adam Cork	King Lear
2011	Nick Manning	Ghost Stories
2011	Gareth Owen	End of the Rainbow
2011	Craig Vear	The Railway Children
2012
2012	Simon Baker	Matilda
2012	Bobby Aitken	Ghost
2012	Ben Ringham and Max Ringham	The Ladykillers
2012	Underworld and Ed Clarke	Frankenstein
2013
2013	Ian Dickinson and Adrian Sutton	The Curious Incident of the Dog in the Night-Time
2013	Paul Groothuis	Sweeney Todd: The Demon Barber of Fleet Street
2013	David McSeveney	Constellations
2013	Gareth Owen	Top Hat
2014
2014	Carolyn Downing	Chimerica
2014	Gareth Owen	Merrily We Roll Along
2014	Simon Baker	The Light Princess
2014	Clive Goodwin	Once
2015
2015	Gareth Owen	Memphis
2015	Tom Gibbons	A View from the Bridge
2015	Matt McKenzie	Sunny Afternoon
2015	Brian Ronan	Beautiful
2016
2016	Tom Gibbons	People, Places and Things
2016	George Dennis	The Homecoming
2016	Christopher Shutt	The Father
2016	Christopher Shutt	Hamlet
2017
2017	Gareth Fry	Harry Potter and the Cursed Child
2017	Paul Arditti	Amadeus
2017	Adam Cork	Travesties
2017	Nick Lidster	Jesus Christ Superstar
2018
2018	Nevin Steinberg	Hamilton
2018	Tom Gibbons	Hamlet
2018	Gareth Owen	Bat Out of Hell
2018	Eric Sleichim	Network
2019
2019	Gareth Owen	Come from Away
2019	Paul Arditti and Christopher Reid	The Inheritance
2019	Mike Beer	A Monster Calls
2019	Carolyn Downing	Summer and Smoke
2019	Nick Powell	The Lehman Trilogy

=== 2020s ===
Year	Designer	Production
2020
2020	Emma Laxton	Emilia
2020	Gregory Clarke	Rosmersholm
2020	Ben Ringham and Max Ringham	Anna
2020	Ben Ringham and Max Ringham	Cyrano de Bergerac
2021	Not presented due to extended closing of theatre productions during COVID-19 pandemic (Note: Due to late March 2020 to late July 2021 closing of London theatre productions during the COVID-19 pandemic in England, the 2022 awards recognise productions that launched anytime from February 2020 to February 2022)	
2022
2022	Nick Lidster	Cabaret
2022	Ian Dickinson	2:22 A Ghost Story
2022	Carolyn Downing	Life of Pi
2022	Gareth Owen	Back to the Future: The Musical
2023
2023	Tony Gayle	My Neighbour Totoro
2023	Bobby Aitken	Standing at the Sky's Edge
2023	Drew Levy	Rodgers and Hammerstein's Oklahoma!
2023	Ben & Max Ringham	Prima Facie
2024
2024	Adam Fisher	Sunset Boulevard
2024	Paul Arditti	Stranger Things: The First Shadow
2024	Dan Balfour & Tom Gibbons	Dear England
2024	Gareth Fry	Macbeth
2025
2025	Nick Lidster	Fiddler on the Roof
2025	Christopher Shutt	Oedipus
2025	Thijs van Vuure	The Years
2025	Koichi Yamamoto	Spirited Away
2026
2026	Giles Thomas	Kenrex
2026	Adam Fisher	Into the Woods
2026	Gareth Owen	Paddington: The Musical
2026	Ryan Rumery	Stereophonic

== See also ==
- Tony Award for Best Sound Design
