= Gareth Fry =

British sound designer

- Born: United Kingdom
- Years active: 2006–present

Gareth Fry is a sound designer based in the United Kingdom. Fry has won several accolades, including Tony and Olivier awards.

== Early life and education ==
Born to a teacher and a panel beater, Fry grew up between Wales and Exeter. He was not interested in theatre growing up, and planned to study artificial intelligence. At age 17, he enrolled in an adult education class that taught MIDI and recording techniques for music production. He became interested in theatre while covering for a sound operator on a production of Amadeus at the Edinburgh Festival in 1992. He went on to study Theatre Design at the Royal Central School of Speech and Drama, graduating in 1996. He then spent three years working for AMS Acoustics, starting with data entry before moving into speech intelligibility modelling software programming.

== Career ==
Fry designed sound for fringe theatre productions, many of which were at the Southwark Playhouse. He also worked simultaneously as a sound operator in London's West End, mixing musicals such as Oh What A Lovely War! and touring internationally with companies like Complicité. Over the course of about 6 years, his sound design work increased frequency until it became full-time.

Fry has worked in the subsidized theatre sector, with shows at venues like the National Theatre, Royal Court and Young Vic Theatre. He has specialized in devised theatre. His work includes over 40 productions with the director Katie Mitchell, including pioneering the use of live Foley sound and live cinema shows, for which he won his first Olivier Award for the sound design of Waves at the National Theatre in 2006.

Gareth also worked on many of Simon McBurney's productions for Complicité, such as The Encounter, for which he also became known for his use of binaural sound on headphones. He has worked with the director John Tiffany, starting with the National Theatre of Scotland's Black Watch in 2006 and then on Harry Potter and the Cursed Child. He won Olivier Awards for his work on both productions.

He has also been involved events and site-specific theatre, such as the 2012 Summer Olympics opening ceremony. He worked again with director Danny Boyle on Free Your Mind, an adaptation of The Matrix films, in 2024 at Aviva Studios in Manchester, subsequently televised on the BBC.

Fry has designed radio plays for the BBC, including The Dark is Rising, Shifts, Omay, OK Computer and Jump. He has also designed exhibitions such as V&A's David Bowie Is, Alice: Curiouser and Curiouser and Diva.

=== Binaural sound and immersive work ===
Beginning with Complicité's The Encounter in 2015, Fry became more well known for his work in binaural sound and immersive audio. This touring theatre production featured a binaural head onstage, alongside actor Simon McBurney, plus a recorded binaural soundtrack. An audience of up to 850 people wore wired headphones to hear the show's soundtrack. Fry created the sound design with Pete Malkin, and spent time in the Amazon rainforest recording sounds for the show. The sound design was highly praised by reviewers and received multiple awards. He used a similar technique for a production of Macbeth in 2023, starring David Tennant and Cush Jumbo, which was nominated for an Olivier Award and received a 2025 WhatsOnStage award for best sound design.

Fry also used binaural sound on the podcast seriesThe Discovery Adventures, primarily recorded on-location across the UK. He also used it again for the BBC and Complicité radio drama, The Dark is Rising, which was nominated for a Best Use of Sound award at the BBC Audio Drama awards.

He has also created work featuring Spatial Audio for VX, AR and XR formats, with his work showing at the Sundance, Tribeca, Venice and London Film Festivals.

=== Association of Sound Designers ===
Fry co-founded the charity Association of Sound Designers, and served as chair of the board from 2011 to 2018.

=== Writing ===
Fry is the author of Sound Design for the Stage, published in 2019 by Crowood Press. He has also authored many articles for the Association of Sound Designers magazine, The Echo.

== Accolades ==
Fry was awarded an honorary fellowship to The Royal Central School of Speech and Drama in 2016. He was named No. 92 in The Stage 100: Theatre's Power List of 2017.

Fry won the 2007 Olivier Award for his work on Waves at the National Theatre with Katie Mitchell. He won the 2009 Olivier Award for his work on the National Theatre of Scotland's Black Watch, directed by John Tiffany, and won the 2008 Helpmann Award for Black Watch's performances in Australia. In 2018, his work on Harry Potter and the Cursed Child was rewarded with a Tony Award, Drama Desk Award, Outer Circle Critics Award, and the 2017 Olivier Award.

Fry won an IRNE Award for Best Sound Design in 2013 for Wild Swans. He was awarded a Tony Award in 2017 for The Encounter, with Pete Malkin. Fry also received the Evening Standard Theatre Award for Best Design in 2016 for The Encounter, as well as a Drama Desk Awards and a Helpmann Awards in 2017. He won the 2025 WhatsOnStage Awards for Best Sound Design for Macbeth, and was nominated in the same category for Punchdrunk's Viola's Room.
