= John Shivers (sound designer) =

Theatrical sound designer based in New York, USA

John Shivers is a theatrical sound designer based in New York, United States. Shivers specialises in the design of sound systems for musical theatre productions on Broadway and internationally.

== Career ==
Shivers was the recipient of the 2013 Tony Award for Best Sound Design of a Musical for his work on the Broadway musical Kinky Boots. Shivers was also nominated for the 2009 Drama Desk Award for Outstanding Sound Design for his work on 9 to 5.

== Broadway productions ==
Shivers has worked on the following productions on Broadway:

- " The Heart of Rock and Roll" (2024)
- "Shucked" (2023)
- "Pretty Woman" (2018)
- "Gettin' The Band Back Together" (2018)
- "Paramour" (2016)
- "Holler If Ya Hear Me" (2014)
- "Soul Doctor" (2013)
- "Kinky Boots" (2013)
- "Leap of Faith" (2012)
- "Bonnie and Clyde" (2011)
- "Hugh Jackman, Back on Broadway" (2011)
- "Sister Act" (2011)
- "9 to 5" (2009)
- "Cat on a Hot Tin Roof" (2008)
- "The Little Mermaid" (2008)
- Disney's "Tarzan" (2006)
- "In My Life" (2005)

== International ==
As part of his international career, Shivers has taken part in the following productions:

- "The Lion King" Paris (2021)
- "The Beauty and the Beast" UK Tour (2021)
- "Wicked" Hamburg (2021)
- "The Beauty and the Beast" Shanghai (2018)
- "Lion King" International Tour (2018)
- "Kinky Boots" Hamburg (2017)
- "The Secret" Shanghai (2016)
- "Tarzan" Oberhausen (2016)
- "Lion King" Shanghai (2016)
- "Kinky Boots" London (2015)
- "Lion King" Mexico City (2015)
- "Das Wunder Von Bern" Hamburg (2014)

== Regional ==
- "Trading Places" Alliance Theater (2022)
- "Afterwords" The 5th Ave Theater (2022)
- "The Wanderer" Paper Mill Playhouse (2022)
- "Becoming Nancy" Alliance Theater (2020)
- "Rock of Ages" The 5th Ave Theater (2019)
- "The Heart of Rock and Roll" Old Globe (2018)
- "Hood" Dallas Theater Center (2017)
- "Born For This" The Broad Stage (2017)
- "Merrily We Roll Along" Huntington (2017)
- "Moonshine" Dallas Theater Center (2016)
- "First Wive's Club" Chicago (2015)
- "Harmony" CTG Los Angeles (2014)

== MUNY St Louis ==
Year	Title	Role	Ref.
2015	My Fair Lady	Sound Designer	
2015	Hairspray	Sound Designer	
2015	Irving Berlin's Holiday Inn	Sound Designer	
2015	Buddy: The Buddy Holly Story	Sound Designer	
2015	Into the Woods	Sound Designer	
2015	Disney's Beauty and the Beast	Sound Designer	
2015	Oklahoma!	Sound Designer	
2016	42nd Street	Sound Designer	
2016	The Music Man	Sound Designer	
2016	Young Frankenstein	Sound Designer	
2016	Mamma Mia	Sound Designer	
2016	Fiddler on the Roof	Sound Designer	
2016	Aida	Sound Designer	
2017	Jesus Christ Superstar	Sound Designer	
2017	The Little Mermaid	Sound Designer	
2017	A Funny Thing Happened on the Way to the Forum	Sound Designer	
2017	All Shook Up	Sound Designer	
2017	The Unsinkable Molly Brown	Sound Designer	
2017	A Chorus Line	Sound Designer	
2017	Newsies	Sound Designer	
2018	Jerome Robbins' Broadway	Sound Designer	
2018	The Wiz	Sound Designer	
2018	Singin' in the Rain	Sound Designer	
2018	Jersey Boys	Sound Designer	
2018	Annie	Sound Designer	
2018	Gypsy	Sound Designer	
2018	Meet Me in St. Louis	Sound Designer	
2019	Guys and Dolls	Sound Designer	
2019	Kinky Boots	Sound Designer	
2019	1776	Sound Designer	
2019	Cinderella	Sound Designer	
2019	Footloose	Sound Designer	
2019	Paint Your Wagon	Sound Designer	
2019	Matilda	Sound Designer	
2021	Smokey Joe's Cafe	Sound Designer	
2021	The Sound of Music	Sound Designer	
2021	Seven Brides for Seven Brothers	Sound Designer	
2021	Chicago	Sound Designer	
2022	Chicago	Sound Designer	
2022	Camelot	Sound Designer	
2022	Sweeney Todd: The Demon Barber of Fleet Street	Sound Designer	
2022	Legally Blonde	Sound Designer	
2022	The Color Purple	Sound Designer	
2023	Beautiful: The Carole King Musical	Sound Designer	
2023	Beauty and the Beast	Sound Designer	
2023	Chess	Sound Designer	
2023	West Side Story	Sound Designer	
2023	Little Shop of Horrors	Sound Designer	
2023	Rent	Sound Designer	
2023	Sister Act	Sound Designer	
2024	Dreamgirls	Sound Designer	
2025	Bring It On	Sound Designer	
2025	Come from Away	Sound Designer	
2025	Frozen	Sound Designer	
2025	Evita	Sound Designer	
2025	Dear Evan Hansen	Sound Designer	
2025	La Cage Aux Folles	Sound Designer	
2025	Jersey Boys	Sound Designer	

== Awards and nominations ==
Award	Year	Category	Work	Result	Ref.
2009	Drama Desk Award	Outstanding Sound Design	9 to 5	Nominated	
2013	Tony Awards	Best Sound Design of a Musical	Kinky Boots	Won	
2023	Tony Awards	Best Sound Design of a Musical	Shucked	Nominated	
2023	Drama Desk Award	Outstanding Sound Design in a Musical	Shucked	Nominated	
2025	Outer Critics Circle Awards	Outstanding Sound Design	Swept Away	Nominated	
