= Mikaal Sulaiman =

Sound designer

Mikaal Sulaiman is a sound designer specializing in sound for plays. He has been nominated twice for Best Sound Design of a Play, and won a Tony Award for his sound design of the 2026 Broadway revival of Death of a Salesman.

== Awards and nominations ==
Year	Award	Category	Work	Result	Ref.
2019	Drama Desk Award	Outstanding Sound Design of a Play	Fairview	Nominated	
2022	Tony Award	Best Sound Design of a Play	Macbeth	Nominated	
2022	Drama Desk Award	Outstanding Sound Design of a Play	Sanctuary City	Nominated	
2023	Drama Desk Award	Outstanding Sound Design of a Play	Fat Ham	Nominated	
2026	Tony Award	Best Sound Design of a Play	Death of a Salesman	Won	
