= Andrew Woodward =

Andrew Woodward may refer to:

- Andy Woodward (Andrew Woodward, born 1973), English footballer
- Andrew Woodward (sailor), Irish sailor, see Mirror World Championship

== See also ==
- Andy Woodward (chess player) (born 2010), American chess player
