= Mirror World Championship =

Dinghy sailing Worlds

The Mirror World Championship is an bi-annual international sailing regatta of Mirror (dinghy), organized by the host club on behalf of the International Mirror Class Association and since 1987 it has been recognized by World Sailing, the sports IOC recognized governing body.

== Events ==
Ed.			Hosts			Sailor			Boats				Ref.
No	Day/Month	Year	Host club	City	Country	No.	Nat.	Cont.	Tot.			Mix	Ref.
1	-	1976		Monnickendam	Netherlands				51				
2		1979			Australia								
3		1983		Wales	United Kingdom								
4		1987			Ireland								
5		1991			Netherlands								
6	30Jul -4Aug	1995	Pembrokeshire Yacht Club	Wales	United Kingdom	138	7	4	68				
7		1997	Sail Cork	Kingston, Ontario	Canada	200	8	5	100	54	10	36	
8	6-11 Apr	1999	Defence Sailing Club (WC) and Saldanha Bay Yacht Club	Saldanha Bay	South Africa	146	6	4	73	50	4	19	
9	1-10 Aug	2001	Howth Yacht Club	Howth, Dublin	Ireland	184	6	3	92				
10	10-16 Jan	2003	Royal Yacht Club of Tasmania	Hobart, Tasmania	Australia		7+	3+	90				
11	7-13 Aug	2005	Storsjons Segelsallskap	Ostersund	Sweden	202	6	3	101				
12	6-19 Jan	2007	Algoa Bay Yacht Club	Gqeberha	South Africa	158	5	3	79	50	12	17	
13	26-31 Jul	2009	Pwllheli Sailing Club	Pwllheli, Wales	United Kingdom	194	5	4	97	38	22	37	
14	27Dec -7Jan	2010/11	Princess Royal Sailing Club	Albany, WA	Australia	122	5	4	61	33	7	21	
15	27Jul -2Aug	2013	Lough Derg Yacht Club	Dromineer, County Tipperary	Ireland	182	7	5	91	39	20	32	
16	28Dec -9Jan	2014/15	Theewaters Sports Club	Villiersdorp	South Africa	118	5	4	59	25	9	25	
17	24 Jul –4 Aug	2017	Restronguet Sailing Club	Mylor, Cornwall	United Kingdom	101	6	4	50	23	7	20	
18	26 Dec -6 Jan	2018/19	Woollahra Sailing Club	Rose Bay, Sydney	Australia	122	6	4	59	32	4	23	
N/A		2021	Sligo Yacht Club	Sligo	Ireland	Cancelled due to COVID							
19	21-29 Jul	2023	Sligo Yacht Club	Sligo	Ireland	104	4	3	52	17	11	24	
20	14–19 April	2025	Durban Beach Club	Durban, KwaZulu-Natal	South Africa	66	3	3	33	25	1	7	

== Medalists ==
Year	Gold	Silver	Bronze	Ref.
1976 (Netherlands)	Roy Patridge (GBR); Graeme Partridge (GBR)	Chris Owen (GBR); Gary Owen (GBR)	Mark Rushall (GBR); Ruth Rushall (GBR)	
1979 (Australia)	60019 - The Gaffer; David Derby (MLT); Chris Bishop (MLT)	57839 - Erewan; K. Sclater (AUS)		
1983 (United Kingdom)	64203 - Freckles; David Sherwin (GBR); Neil Salmon (GBR)	66066 - True Brit; Dave Derby (GBR)		
1987 (Republic of Ireland)	67841 - Intrepid; Paul Adrid (AUS); Troy Storer (AUS)	67749 - Sky 3 Dave Graney (AUS)		
1991 (Netherlands)	68968; Tom King (AUS); Rof Heale (AUS)	69201; T. Fitzsimmons (AUS)		
1995 (United Kingdom)	69664 - Surreal; Clive Goodwin (GBR); Toby Heppell (GBR)	69030 - Mach 1 Mel Collins (IRL); Stephen Hyde (IRL)	69561; Graham Elmes (IRL); K.Cooney (IRL)	
1997 (Canada)	69659 - Renaissance; Chris Balding (GBR); Nikki Harper (GBR)	69560 - Flashpoint II; Ross Killian (IRL); Darren McCann (IRL)	69837; David Gebhard (GBR); Joshua Gebhard (GBR)	
1999	69831 - Surreal 11; Martin Moloney (IRL); Revelin Minihane (IRL)	69361 - Xcell-Erate; Mark Padgett (AUS); John Fletcher (AUS)	Toby Wincer (GBR); Richard Harding (GBR)	
2001	Ireland; Peter Bayly; William Atkinson	Australia; Torvar Mirsky; Justin Jacob	Ireland; Nick Meadow; Sam Trott	
2003	Ireland; Christopher Clayton; Craig Martin	Ireland; Andrew Woodward; James Bendon	Australia; Glenn Collings; Lloyd Collings	
2005	Ireland; Ross Kearney; Adam McCullough	Ireland; Simon McGrotty; Melissa Daly	Great Britain; John Clementson; Jamie Clementson	
2007	Great Britain; Anna MacKenzie; Holly Scott	Australia; Nick Davis; John Collova	Ireland; Paul Amrlynck; Melissa Daly	
2009	Great Britain; Andy Smith; Tom Smith	Great Britain; Christopher Rust; Jessica Rust	Great Britain; Izzy Fitzgerald; Emily Peters	
2011	Ireland; Ross Kearney; Max Odell	Philippines; Ridgely Balladares; Rommel Chavez	Great Britain; Millie Newman; Jessica Rust	
2013	South Africa; Ryan Robinson; Michaela Robinson	Great Britain; Sarah Richards; George Richards	Great Britain; Katie Davies; Gemma Keers	
2015	South Africa; Ryan Robinson; Michaela Robinson	Australia; Simon Barwood; Tyson Barwood	Great Britain; Eleanor Keers; Isobel Pugh	
2017	AUS 70922 - Wave Catcher Too; Cullen Hughes (AUS); Rowan Hughes (AUS)	GBR 70852; Dave Wade (GBR); Imogen Wade (GBR)	AUS 70921 = Platypus; Simon Barwood (AUS); Tyson Barwood (AUS)	
2019	NED 70883 - Rumble Fish; John Dransfield (NED); Tyler Dransfield (NED)	AUS 70854 - Wave Catcher; Cullen Hughes (AUS); Rowan Hughes (AUS)	AUS 70951 - McMissile; Campbell McKay (AUS); Stirling McKay (AUS)	
2021	Rescheduled to 2023 due to COVID 19			
2023	GBR 71038 - Anna; Ben McGrane (GBR); Keira McGrane (GBR)	GBR 70683 - Hypermouse; Stuart Hudson (GBR); Lizzie Hudson (GBR)	GBR 70573 - Little Miss Chatterbox; Will Crocker (GBR); Isabelle Crocker (GBR)	
2025	AUS-70812; James Komweibel (AUS); Harry Komweibel (AUS)	AUS-69536; David Meehan (AUS); Henry Olsen (AUS)	RSA-70207; Thomas Funke (RSA); Kai Funke (RSA)	
