= After Midnight (musical) =

2013 Broadway musical

- Opening Night Playbill
- Music: Various Artists
- Lyrics: Various Artists
- Basis: The music of Duke Ellington, Jimmy McHugh, Dorothy Fields, Harold Arlen and Ted Koehler
- Productions: 2011, 2012 Encores! 2013 Broadway (Brooks Atkinson Theater) 2015 Norwegian Escape

After Midnight is a Broadway musical that premiered at the Brooks Atkinson Theatre in 2013. The revue is based on an earlier 2011 revue, titled Cotton Club Parade, which ran in concert at Encores! in 2011 and 2012.

== Overview ==
After Midnight is the Broadway production of Cotton Club Parade that premiered Off-Broadway at New York City Center's Encores! concert series in November 2011, starring Amber P. Riley in 2012 as the Special Guest Star and directed and choreographed by Warren Carlyle with music direction by Jazz at Lincoln Center artistic director Wynton Marsalis. Cotton Club Parade played a return engagement in November 2012 at New York City Center Encores!. The Cotton Club Parade was conceived by Jack Viertel, artistic director of "Encores!", who said "When we started rehearsals for 'Cotton Club Parade' in 2011, we knew we had something very special in store for audiences. Now that we’ve wrapped up our second run of this show at City Center, I couldn’t be more proud to have the show come to Broadway."

The revue takes place "after midnight" in New York's Harlem. It features jazz pieces by Duke Ellington, Jimmy McHugh, Dorothy Fields and Harold Arlen, framed by the poetry of Langston Hughes. The show features an orchestra of 17 musicians, 25 vocalists, dancers and performers. It is headlined by a rotating list of performers.

== Production ==
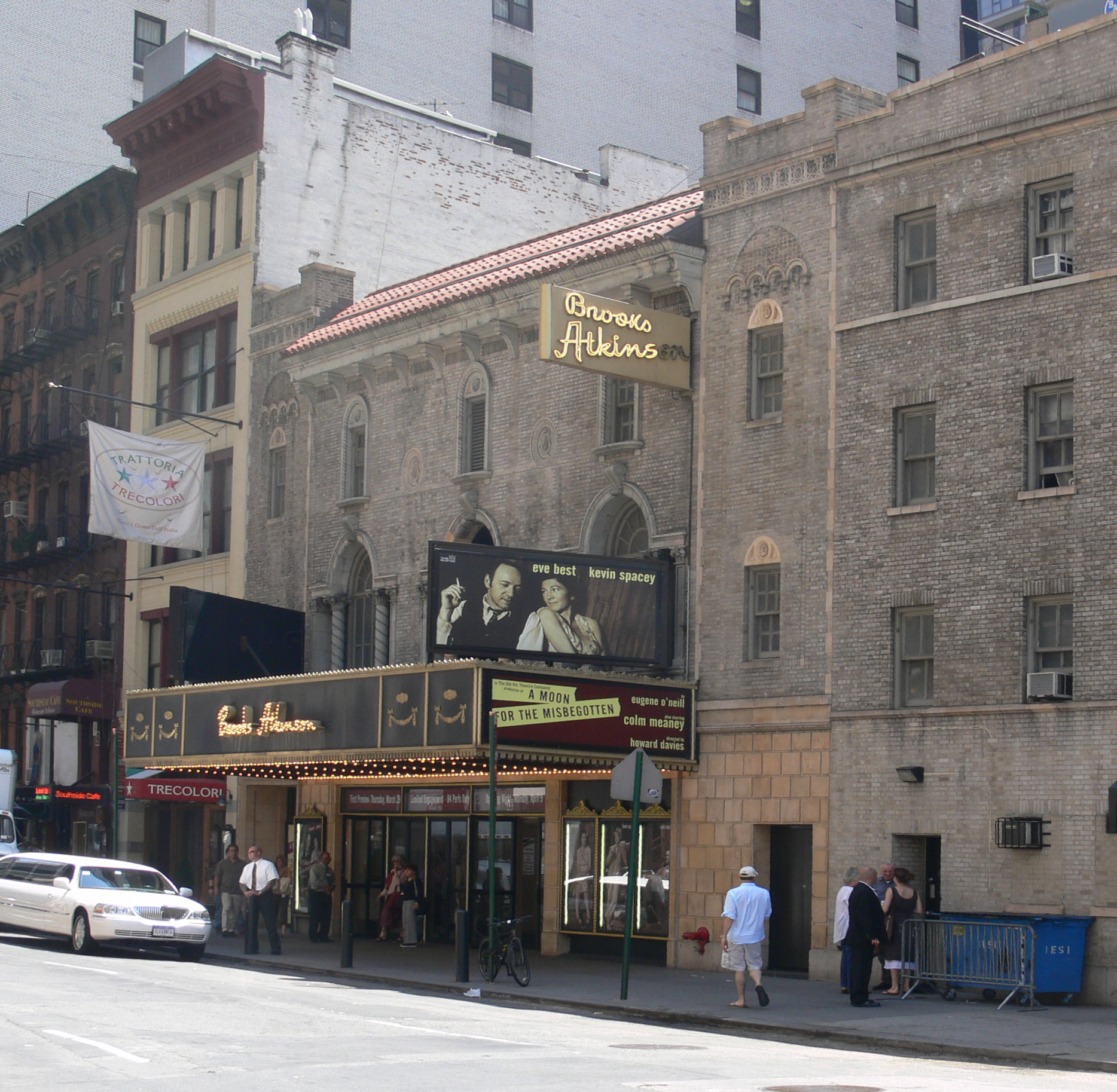
The Brooks Atkinson Theatre where After Midnight was Performed

The Broadway production began previews at the Brooks Atkinson Theatre on October 18, 2013, and opened on November 3, 2013, with special guest star Fantasia Barrino, who performed through February 9, 2014. The production features Dulé Hill as "The Host", Adriane Lenox, Karine Plantadit and Desmond Richardson. Direction and choreography is by Warren Carlyle, with Scenic Design by John Lee Beatty, costumes by Isabel Toledo, lighting by Howell Binkley, and sound by Peter Hylenski.

Dancers and vocalists include: Julius "iGlide" Chisolm, Virgil J. Gadson, Dormeshia Sumbry-Edwards, Jared Grimes, Everett Bradley, Cedric Neal, T. Oliver Reid, Monroe Kent III, Carmen Ruby Floyd, Rosena M. Hill Jackson, Bryonha Marie Parham, Marija Abney, Phillip Attmore, Christopher Broughton, Taeler Elyse Cyrus, C.K. Edwards, Bahiyah Hibah, Erin Moore, Justin Prescott, Allysa Shorte, Monique Smith, Daniel Watts, Danielle Herbert and David Jennings. The show was produced by Scott Sanders, Wynton Marsalis, Roy Furman, Candy Spelling, Starry Night Entertainment, Hal Newman, Allan S. Gordon and Adam S. Gordon, James L. Nederlander, Robert K. Kraft, Catherine and Fred Adler, Robert Appel, Jeffrey Bolton, Scott M Delman, James Fantaci, Ted Liebowitz, Stephanie P. McClelland, Sandy Block and Carol R. Fineman.

Special guest stars after Fantasia Barrino included k.d. lang (February 11 – March 9), Toni Braxton with Babyface (March 18 – March 30), Vanessa Williams (April 1 – May 11), Barrino (May 13 – June 8) and Patti LaBelle (June 10 – June 29). The show closed on June 29, 2014, after 272 performances and 19 previews; LaBelle was the final guest star. Gladys Knight and Natalie Cole were set to join the cast as special guest stars but the show closed before their set dates.

Upon closing, Broadway Licensing acquired the rights for stock and amateur performance rights.

== Songs ==
- "Daybreak Express"

(music and lyrics by Duke Ellington)

- "Happy As the Day Is Long"

(music and lyrics by Ted Koehler and Harold Arlen)

- "Between the Devil and the Deep Blue Sea"

(music and lyrics by Ted Koehler and Harold Arlen)

- "I've Got the World on a String"

(music and lyrics by Ted Koehler and Harold Arlen)

- "Women Be Wise"

(music and lyrics by Sippie Wallace)

- "Braggin' in Brass"

(music and lyrics by Duke Ellington, Henry Nemo and Irving Mills)

- "Can't Give You Anything But Love"

(music and lyrics by Dorothy Fields and Jimmy McHugh)

- "Peckin'"

(music and lyrics by Ben Pollack and Harry James)

- "Diga Diga Doo"

(music and lyrics by Jimmy McHugh and Dorothy Fields)

- "East St. Louis Toodle-Oo"

(music and lyrics by Duke Ellington and Bubber Miley)

- "Stormy Weather"

(music and lyrics by Harold Arlen and Ted Koehler)

- "The Skrontch"

(music and lyrics by Duke Ellington, Henry Nemo and Irving Mills)

- "Hottentot Tot"

(music and lyrics by Dorothy Fields and Jimmy McHugh)

- "Raisin' the Rent"

(music and lyrics by Harold Arlen and Ted Koehler)

- "Get Yourself a New Broom"

(music and lyrics by Harold Arlen and Ted Koehler)

- "Zaz Zuh Zaz"

(music and lyrics by Harry A. White and Cab Calloway)

- "Creole Love Call"

(music and lyrics by Duke Ellington)

- "Go Back Where You Stayed Last Night"

(music and lyrics by Ethel Waters and Sidney Easton)

- "The Mooche"

(music and lyrics by Irving Mills and Duke Ellington)

- "Ain't it De Truth?"

(music and lyrics by Harold Arlen and E.Y. Harburg)

- "On the Sunny Side of the Street"

(music and lyrics by Dorothy Fields and Jimmy McHugh)

- "The Gal From Joe's"

(music and lyrics by Irving Mills and Duke Ellington)

- "Black and Tan Fantasy"

(music and lyrics by Duke Ellington and Bubber Miley)

- "Tap Mathematician"

(music and lyrics by Duke Ellington)

- "It Don't Mean a Thing"

(music and lyrics by Duke Ellington)

- "Cotton Club Stomp"

(music and lyrics by Duke Ellington, Harry Carney and Johnny Hodges)

- "Freeze and Melt"

(music and lyrics by Dorothy Fields and Jimmy McHugh)

- "Rockin' in Rhythm"

(music and lyrics by Duke Ellington, Irving Mills and Harry Carney)

== Critical reception ==
Stephen Holden, in his review of the Cotton Club Parade in 2011 for The New York Times wrote: "The revue’s solution to the debatable issue of caricature and at what point a broad performance becomes a demeaning minstrel-show parody is to rein in the extremes. But it is in no way sedate. If the show has no Nell Carter or Ruth Brown, it does have Adriane Lenox, who delivers the Sippie Wallace advice song 'Women Be Wise'... with a knowing tang.... Mr. Carlyle’s clean choreography connects variations of the Charleston with jitterbugging and a little break-dancing to suggest the continuity of styles without insisting on it."

Elysa Gardner in her review for USA Today wrote: "...you get 90 minutes of honest, vital entertainment, delivered with enough breezy wit to mitigate the flashes of pomp."

Linda Winer, in her review for Newsday, noted that the most important part of the revue is the band. She wrote: "When that push for slickness goes into overdrive, the ensemble can feel ragged.... Adriane Lenox is marvelous in such sardonic, been-around revelations as 'Go Back Where You Stayed Last Night.' The dancers, led by former Twyla Tharp star Karine Plantadit, are strong."

== Awards and nominations ==
| Year | Award Ceremony | Category | Nominee | Result |
|---|---|---|---|---|
| 2014 | Tony Award | Best Musical | | Nominated |
| 2014 | Tony Award | Best Featured Actress in a Musical | Adriane Lenox | Nominated |
| 2014 | Tony Award | Best Direction of a Musical | Warren Carlyle | Nominated |
| 2014 | Tony Award | Best Choreography | Warren Carlyle | Won |
| 2014 | Tony Award | Best Costume Design of a Musical | Isabel Toledo | Nominated |
| 2014 | Tony Award | Best Lighting Design of a Musical | Howell Binkley | Nominated |
| 2014 | Tony Award | Best Sound Design of a Musical | Peter Hylenski | Nominated |
| 2014 | Drama Desk Awards | Outstanding Musical Revue | | Won |
| 2014 | Drama Desk Awards | Outstanding Featured Actress in a Musical | Adriane Lenox | Nominated |
| 2014 | Drama Desk Awards | Outstanding Choreography | Warren Carlyle | Won |
| 2014 | Outer Critics Circle Awards | Outstanding New Broadway Musical | | Nominated |
| 2014 | Outer Critics Circle Awards | Outstanding Director of a Musical | Warren Carlyle | Nominated |
| 2014 | Outer Critics Circle Awards | Outstanding Choreographer | Warren Carlyle | Won |
| 2014 | Outer Critics Circle Awards | Outstanding Costume Design | Isabel Toledo | Nominated |
| 2014 | Outer Critics Circle Awards | Outstanding Lighting Design | Howell Binkley | Nominated |
| 2014 | Fred & Adele Astaire Awards | Outstanding Female Dancer | Dormeshia Sumbry Edwards & Karine Plantadit | Won |
| 2014 | Fred & Adele Astaire Awards | Outstanding Male Dancer | Jared Grimes | Won |
| 2014 | Fred & Adele Astaire Awards | Outstanding Choreographer | Warren Carlyle | Won |

== See also ==
- Cotton Club
