= The Testament of Mary (play) =

The Testament of Mary is a play written by Colm Tóibín, based on his 2012 novella of the same name and 2011 play Testament. The play is a solo performance depicting "the mother of Jesus [who] tells her story of her son’s Crucifixion" and questions his death and divinity. After a 2011 Irish production, the play ran briefly on Broadway in 2013, closing after only two weeks of a scheduled 12-week run, but it was nominated for three Tony Awards, including Best Play.

== Background ==
Tóibín wrote in The New York Times that he began writing the play because he felt "almost a vacuum of faith in Ireland" in late 2008. He said "the impulse to write the play was not political, was not to intervene in a debate about the church, but rather to work with a voice that had mattered to me personally, a voice that was iconic as well as human." Further, he noted that he had "seen great performances in the Irish theater", which meant that "In their performances the act of utterance itself took on a sort of soaring nervous power."

After the initial reading at the Dublin Theatre Festival in 2011 of an earlier version of the play and the writing of the novella, Tóibin "rewrote the original play, with the images starker, the voice even more urgent and filled with human pain."

== Production history ==
The Testament of Mary was initially performed at the Dublin Theatre Festival, under the title Testament in October 2011, and was in the form of a monologue. The production was directed by Garry Hynes and starred Marie Mullen. The novella was written after this production.

The play opened on Broadway at the Walter Kerr Theatre in a limited run on April 22, 2013 after 27 previews; it closed on May 5, 2013, only two weeks into its scheduled 12-week run. Fiona Shaw starred as Mary. The play was directed by Deborah Warner, with sets by Tom Pye, costumes by Ann Roth, lighting by Jennifer Tipton and original music and sound design by Mel Mercier.

In the fall of 2015, a new version of the play with five women sharing the role of Mary was presented privately to members of the theatrical community. This reinterpretation was adapted and directed by Michael Rader and the cast included Lynn Cohen, Adriane Lenox, Jill Paice, Elizabeth Kemp and Thursday Farrar.

In early 2017, the Sydney Theatre Company mounted the Australian premiere of the play at the Wharf Theatre, with Alison Whyte playing the role of Mary. In November that same year, another production of the play was staged for a limited run at the Malthouse Theatre in Melbourne, starring acting veteran Pamela Rabe and directed by Anne-Louise Sarks.

== Protests ==
In response to a question whether the fact that the play "could stir up a lot of controversy [that might] intimidate or excite you", Tóibín replied "The text, what I wrote and what they're doing, is very serious. It's not as though we're attempting to get involved with the mockery of icons. It's almost that we're recreating or exploring an icon, rather than reducing the iconic. So I would imagine people will respect that. I am serious."

The American Society for the Defense of Tradition, Family and Property protested at the first preview of the play and again at its opening, asserting that the depiction of Mary in the play is blasphemous. The producers issued a statement, which read, in part: "The Testament of Mary explores, in a very serious way, something that matters deeply to all of us. It is neither anti-Mary nor anti-Christianity, but rather a portrait of a very human woman – a mother – who is trying to make sense of and come to terms with the tragic death of her son.... let the work speak for itself."

== Critical response ==
In reviewing the Dublin 2011 performance, a reviewer for The Guardian wrote: "With its poetic diction, historical allusion and philosophical range, this demanding script at times seems more suited to aural narration than theatrical performance. Director Garry Hynes keeps the staging to an austere minimum: in a barely furnished room, the shifting light and overhead projection of cloud formations are the only accompaniments to Marie Mullen's occasionally tentative delivery. And yet, it seems fitting to sit in a communal space and remember all the other congregations down the centuries who have worshipped a mother, who, in this interpretation, is herself in need of the succour of a female deity: the virgin goddess, Artemis."

Reviews on Broadway were mixed. In The New York Times, Ben Brantley praised "the writing and performance but expressing dismay about the fussy embellishments of Warner’s production." On the other hand, a review in Backstage commented, "the stage is littered with a mix of properly historical and more-contemporary items, and Mary is seen smoking what appear to be joints of marijuana and swigging from a commercially labeled liquor bottle. None of these things are in the printed script, and they begin to feel so calculated and intellectualized that an airlessness pervades the proceedings."

Fintan O’Toole wrote in The Irish Times, "by Broadway’s logic The Testament of Mary 'got the "wrong" nominations'. If Fiona Shaw had received a nod from the Tony, for instance, the show might have been saved; but not enough out-of-towners will book a ticket on the basis of superlative designs." The Irish Theatre Magazine concluded: "For many, though, this will have been one of the better plays to reach Broadway that was never seen."

== Awards and nominations ==
The Testament of Mary received three nominations for Tony Awards in the categories of Best Play, Best Lighting Design and Best Sound Design. Mel Mercier won the Drama Desk Award for Outstanding Sound Design.

The play also received two Drama League Award nominations but did not win either. The production received two Outer Critics Circle Award nominations but did not win.

=== Original Broadway production ===
Year	Award	Category	Nominee	Result
2013	Drama League Award	Outstanding Production of a Broadway or Off-Broadway Play		Nominated
2013	Drama League Award	Distinguished Performance Award	Fiona Shaw	Nominated
2013	Outer Critics Circle Award	Outstanding New Broadway Play		Nominated
2013	Outer Critics Circle Award	Outstanding Solo Performance	Fiona Shaw	Nominated
2013	Drama Desk Award	Outstanding Sound Design of a Play	Mel Mercier	Won
2013	Tony Award	Best Play		Nominated
2013	Tony Award	Best Lighting Design of a Play	Jennifer Tipton	Nominated
2013	Tony Award	Best Sound Design of a Play	Mel Mercier	Nominated
2013	United Solo Special Award	For outstanding achievements in popularizing the form of solo performance	Fiona Shaw	Won
