= Michael Rader =

American film director

Michael Rader is a stage director based in New York City. In addition to his work as a director, Rader has also served as Artistic Director for Cirque du Soleil, the Producing Artistic Director of The Cape Playhouse and the Executive Producer for Theatre Aspen.

During Mr. Rader’s leadership at The Cape Playhouse, the organization experienced a remarkable period of growth and advancement. Notably, Mr. Rader guided the institution through advancements in programming and impressive improvements in the quality of productions. These developments resulted in substantial increases in ticket sales, a resurgence of subscribers, and a platform for successful fundraising that set the theatre on strong financial footing. The Playhouse productions of Gypsy and South Pacific, which Mr. Rader personally directed, enjoyed record-breaking box-office sales. During Mr. Rader's tenure, The Cape Playhouse has been recognized as one of the “50 Best Small Stage Theatres in America.” Mr. Rader was also responsible for implementing new arts education programming, substantially expanding a mentoring system for production staff, and modifying The Playhouse’s performance calendar to allow for the implementation of higher quality productions. Mr. Rader guided the transformation of programming during the Covid-19 pandemic to include outdoor concerts, New England-centric lectures, a streaming production of A Christmas Carol, creation of The Gertrude Lawrence Awards, and diverse digital content, including online educational offerings.

Notable directing and associate credits include Cirque du Soleil's production of Varekai, the Broadway national tour of A Christmas Story, the off-broadway production of Stalking the Bogeyman and a radical reconceptualization of Colm Tóibín's controversial play The Testament of Mary.

Additional highlights as a director or associate include: A Christmas Story (National Tour), Stalking The Bogeyman (NYTimes Critics Pick, Outer Critics Circle Nomination), Varekai (Cirque Du Soleil), The Testament of Mary, Deep Love (NYMF 2015), A Christmas Carol (National Tour), Mandela! with Norm Lewis, You are Not Alone with Betty Buckley and Lea DeLaria, and productions with Sacramento Music Circus, The ZACH Theatre, The York Theatre Company, The Actors Studio Repertory Theatre, The Human Race Theatre, The Dramatist Guild, The Huron Playhouse, The Forestburgh Playhouse, Joe's Pub and the critically acclaimed Off-Broadway benefit production of William Finn's Elegies: A Song Cycle. Michael's direction of the show, benefiting marriage equality, was acclaimed as "…profound and visionary."

Rader attended Alter High School in Kettering, Ohio, graduating in 1997. He then attended Wright State University and Baldwin-Wallace College, graduating with a BFA in Musical Theatre in 2001.[2] He later earned his MFA in Directing from The Actors Studio Drama School at Pace University.
