= Nevin Steinberg =

Sound designer

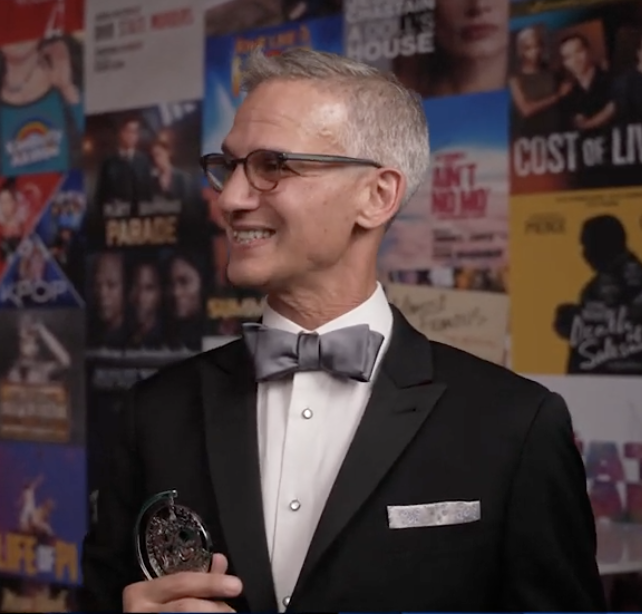
- Steinberg at the 2023 Tony Awards
- Occupation: Sound designer

Nevin Steinberg is a sound designer. In 2000, he co-founded Acme Sound Partners along with sound designers Tom Clark and Mark Menard. He has sound designed or been a co-sound designer on 57 Broadway theatre productions.

== Awards ==
Steinberg and Jessica Paz won a Tony Award for Best Sound Design in 2019, for Hadestown. Steinberg won his second Tony Award for Best Sound Design in 2023, for the Broadway revival of Sweeney Todd: The Demon Barber of Fleet Street.
