= Pete Malkin =

British sound designer

- Born: United Kingdom
- Occupation: Sound designer

Pete Malkin is a London-based theatre and film sound designer. He has worked extensively with the directors Clint Dyer and Simon McBurney, and won a Tony Award for his work on Complicité's The Encounter.

== Early life ==
Malkin played guitar in a band as a teenager, before studying Music Technology in college. He studied Theatre Sound at the Royal Central School of Speech and Drama. In his final year he went on a work placement on Complicité's show, The Master and Margarita, leading to further work with the company.

== Career ==
In 2012, he worked on the Opening Ceremony of the London 2012 Olympic Games.

He spoke out in 2016 about the Tony Award committee's decision to remove the sound design award, saying "it's very clear that [sound design is] an art form in itself". The following April, the Tony Awards committee reinstated the award following industry backlash. Malkin was awarded a Special Tony Award for his work on The Encounter, which featured sound design as a key component of the show, with the entire audience wearing headphones for the show, using binaural sound.

In 2016, he worked on Harry Potter and the Cursed Child in London, then in Broadway in 2017, and on subsequent productions.

He has co-designed several shows with Benjamin Grant, including the Death of England cycle of plays at the Royal National Theatre.

== Composition ==
Malkin writes music for film and media, published by Evolving Sound. It has been featured in trailers for The Rings Of Power, Season 2, The Front Room and The House of the Dragon.

== Recognition ==
Malkin has won and been nominated for many awards:

- Evening Standard Award (2016)
- Special Tony Award (2017)
- Drama Desk Award (2017)
- Helpmann Award for Sound Design (2017), with Gareth Fry, for Complicité's The Encounter
- Nominated for the 2016 Offie for Home Chat
- Outer Critics Circle Award (nominated) (2017) for The Encounter
- Broadway World UK Award (nominated) (2017) for The Kid Stays in the Picture
- Theatre & Technical award for Creative Innovation in Sound for The Unreturning (nominated) (2019)
- Nominated for the 2020 Offie for The Unreturning
