= Ruben Toledo =

Cuban-American artist (born 1961)

- Born: 1961 (age 64–65); Havana, Cuba
- Spouse: Isabel Toledo (m. 1984; died 2019)

Ruben Toledo (born 1961, Havana, Cuba) is a Cuban-American artist based in New York City.

== Personal life ==
Toledo and his wife Isabel met in high school in West New York, New Jersey.

== Books ==
In 1997, Toledo authored Style Dictionary, a collection of drawings and watercolors. He completed his first film, Fashionation, an animated history of French fashion, based on a book of the same name. Toledo illustrated special edition book jackets for Penguin Classics Deluxe Editions of Jane Eyre, Dracula, The Scarlet Letter, Wuthering Heights, The Picture of Dorian Gray and Pride and Prejudice.

List of titles:

- Style Dictionary. Abbeville Press. 1997. ISBN 0789203480.
- Fashionation. Edition 7L. 2009. ISBN 978-3865213013.

== Exhibitions ==
Ruben Toledo's collaboration with his fashion designer wife, Isabel Toledo, was the subject of both a book and a museum exhibition titled Toledo/Toledo: A Marriage of Art and Fashion at The Museum at the Fashion Institute of Technology.

== Awards ==
Ruben and Isabel Toledo were the recipient of the 2005 Cooper-Hewitt National Design Award for their work in fashion.
