= Paul Arditti =

British sound designer

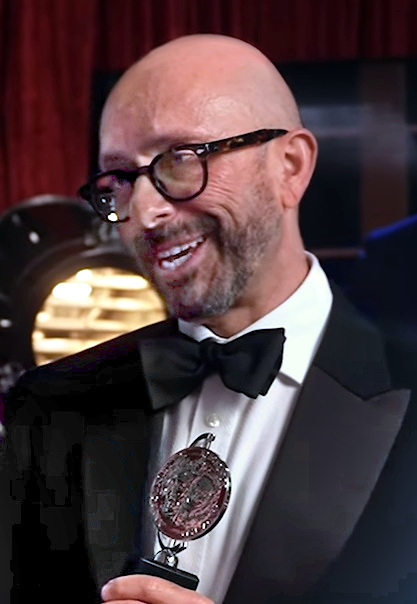
- Arditti at 78th Tony Awards 2025
- Known for: sound design
- Awards: Olivier Award for Best Sound Design; Tony Award for Best Sound Design; Drama Desk Award for Outstanding Sound Design

Paul Arditti is a British sound designer, working mostly in the UK and the US. He specialises in sound for theatre musicals and plays. He has won awards for his work including two Tony Awards, two Olivier Awards, five Drama Desk Awards and a BroadwayWorld.com Fans' Choice Award.

In the UK, he has designed sound at the National Theatre, Donmar Warehouse, Bridge Theatre, Royal Shakespeare Company, Royal Court Theatre, Almeida Theatre, Young Vic Theatre, and in the West End, as well as many regional theatres.

In September 2015, Paul was appointed an associate director at the National Theatre.

In the US, he has designed sound for many Broadway and off-Broadway productions, as well as in other New York venues such as St Ann's Warehouse, New York Theatre Workshop, Brooklyn Academy of Music, and Lincoln Center.

Paul studied Drama and English at The University of Hull, graduating in 1983.

== London work (selected) ==
- Brace Brace (2024) directed by Daniel Raggett, Royal Court Theatre Upstairs, London
- Stranger Things: The First Shadow (2023) directed by Stephen Daldry and Justin Martin, Phoenix Theatre, London
- The Odyssey: Part 5 The Underworld (2023) directed by Emily Lim, National Theatre, London
- The Motive And The Cue (2023) directed by Sam Mendes, National Theatre, London and Noël Coward Theatre, London
- Guys and Dolls (2023) directed by Nicholas Hytner, Bridge Theatre, London
- The Crucible (2022) directed by Lyndsey Turner, sound co-designed with Tingying Dong, Olivier Theatre, London
- Jack Absolute Flies Again (2022) directed by Emily Burns, Olivier Theatre, London
- Our Generation (2022) directed by Daniel Evans, Minerva Theatre, Chichester, Dorfman Theatre, London
- La Belle Sauvage - The Book Of Dust (2021) directed by Nicholas Hytner, Bridge Theatre, London
- Caroline, Or Change (2018–2021) directed by Michael Longhurst, Minerva Theatre, Chichester, Hampstead Theatre, Playhouse Theatre, London
- Dick Whittington (2020) directed by Ned Bennett, Olivier Theatre, London
- The Visit (2020) directed by Jeremy Herrin Olivier Theatre, London
- A Very Expensive Poison (2019) directed by John Crowley, Old Vic, London
- Tree (2019) directed by Kwame Kwei-Armah, Young Vic, London, Manchester International Festival
- A Midsummer Night's Dream (2019), directed by Nicholas Hytner, Bridge Theatre, London
- Rutherford and Son (2019), directed by Polly Findlay, Lyttelton Theatre, London
- Shipwreck (2019) directed by Rupert Goold, Almeida Theatre, London
- The Inheritance (2018) directed by Stephen Daldry, Young Vic Theatre, Noël Coward Theatre, London, co-sound-designed with Christopher Reid
- Pericles (2018) a musical version by Chris Bush and Jim Fortune directed by Emily Lim, Olivier Theatre, London
- The Prime of Miss Jean Brodie (2018), directed by Polly Findlay, Donmar Warehouse, London
- Absolute Hell (2018) directed by Joe Hill-Gibbins, National Theatre, London
- Macbeth (2018), directed by Rufus Norris, National Theatre, London
- Mary Stuart (2018), directed by Robert Icke, Almeida Theatre, Duke of York's Theatre, London
- Amadeus (2017 - 2018) featuring the Southbank Sinfonia, directed by Michael Longhurst, Olivier Theatre, London
- Beginning (2018) directed by Polly Findlay, Dorman Theatre, Ambassadors Theatre, London
- Julius Caesar (2018) directed by Nicholas Hytner, Bridge Theatre, London
- The Jungle (2017) directed by Stephen Daldry and Justin Martin, Young Vic Theatre, London
- Young Marx (2017) directed by Nicholas Hytner, Bridge Theatre, London
- Labour Of Love (2017) directed Jeremy Herrin, Noël Coward Theatre, London
- Hamlet (2017) directed by Kenneth Branagh, RADA, London
- Mosquitoes (2017) directed by Rufus Norris, National Theatre, London
- Betrayal (2017) directed by Lekan Lawal, Derby Theatre
- A Midsummer Night’s Dream (2017) directed by Joe Hill-Gibbins, Young Vic, London
- The Glass Menagerie (2017), directed by John Tiffany, Duke of York's Theatre, London
- Mary Stuart (2016) directed by Robert Icke, Almeida Theatre, London
- The Emperor (2016), directed by Walter Meierjohann, Maria Theatre, Young Vic, London & HOME, Manchester
- The Threepenny Opera (2016) directed by Rufus Norris, Olivier Theatre, London
- If You Kiss Me Kiss Me (2016) directed by Aletta Collins, Young Vic Theatre, London
- Red Velvet (2014–2016) directed by Indhu Rubasingham, Tricycle Theatre, London and St Ann's Warehouse, Brooklyn, New York, Garrick Theatre, London
- Ma Rainey’s Black Bottom (2016) directed by Dominic Cooke, Lyttelton Theatre, London
- Wonder.land (2015) - director: Rufus Norris, Royal National Theatre, London
- Everyman (2015) - director: Rufus Norris, Royal National Theatre, London
- Measure for Measure (2015) directed by Joe Hill-Gibbins, Young Vic Theatre, London
- Bakkhai (2015) directed by James MacDonald,music by Orlando Gough, Almeida Theatre, London
- Skylight (2014) - director: Stephen Daldry, West End, Broadway
- The Hard Problem (2015) - director: Nicholas Hytner, Royal National Theatre, London
- Behind the Beautiful Forevers (2014) - director: Rufus Norris, Royal National Theatre, London
- A Streetcar Named Desire (2014) - director: Benedict Andrews, Young Vic, West End, Broadway
- King Lear (2014) - director: Sam Mendes, Royal National Theatre, London
- King Charles III (2014) - director: Rupert Goold, Almeida Theatre, West End, London, Broadway
- The Scottsboro Boys (2014) - director: Susan Stroman, Young Vic, West End
- Little Revolution (2014) - director: Joe Hill-Gibbons, Almeida Theatre, London
- Great Britain (2014) - director: Nicholas Hytner, Royal National Theatre, London
- Charlie and The Chocolate Factory (2013) - director: Sam Mendes, Theatre Royal Drury Lane Theatre, London
- The Audience (2013) - director: Stephen Daldry, Gielgud Theatre, London, Broadway
- Dr Dee (2013) - director: Rufus Norris, Manchester International Festival and English National Opera
- The Most Incredible Thing by The Pet Shop Boys, director, Javier de Frutos, Sadler's Wells, London
- American Psycho (2013) directed by Rupert Goold, Almeida Theatre, London
- Edward II (2013) directed by Joe Hill-Gibbins, National Theatre, London
- Feast (2013) - director: Rufus Norris, a Royal Court Theatre and Young Vic co-production, London
- In The Republic of Happiness (2012) - director: Dominic Cooke, Royal Court Theatre, London
- The Magistrate (2012) - director: Tim Sheader, National Theatre, London
- Red Velvet (2012) by Lolita Chakabarti - director: Indhu Rubasingham, Tricycle Theatre, London
- Three Sisters (2012) - director: Benedict Andrews, Young Vic, London
- London Road (2012) by Alecky Blythe and Adam Cork - director: Rufus Norris, National Theatre
- In Basildon (2012) - director: Dominic Cooke, Royal Court Theatre, London
- The Changeling (2012) - director: Joe Hill-Gibbons, Young Vic London
- Collaborators (2012) - director: Nick Hytner, National Theatre, London
- Jumpy (2011) by April de Angelis - director: Nina Raine, Duke of York's Theatre and Royal Court Theatre, London
- One Man, Two Guvnors (2011) by Richard Bean - director: Nick Hytner, National Theatre and Broadway transfer
- The Veil (2011) written and directed by Conor McPherson, Lyttelton Theatre, London
- Blood and Gifts (2010) dir: Howard Davies, Lyttelton Theatre, London
- The Beauty Queen of Leenane (2010) dir: Joe Hill-Gibbins, Young Vic Theatre, London
- Love The Sinner (2010) dir: Matthew Dunster, Cottesloe Theatre, London
- A Ring, A Lamp, A Thing (2010) music: Orlando Gough, libretto: Caryl Churchill, dir: James MacDonald. Linbury Studio at The Royal Opera House, London]
- When The Rain Stops Falling (2009) director: Michael Attenborough, Almeida Theatre, London
- Under The Blue Sky (2008) director: Anna Mackmin, Duke of York's Theatre, London
- The Diver (2008) director: Hideki Noda, Soho Theatre, London
- The Revenger's Tragedy (2008) director: Melly Still, Royal National Theatre, London
- The Year of Magical Thinking (2008) director: David Hare, National Theatre, London and Booth Theatre, Broadway
- Never So Good (2008) director: Howard Davies, National Theatre, London
- Happy Now? (2008) director: Thea Sharrock, National Theatre, London
- Saint Joan (2008) director: Marianne Elliott, National Theatre, London
- The Member of the Wedding (2007) director: Matthew Dunster, Young Vic Theatre, London
- Vernon God Little (2007) director: Rufus Norris, Young Vic Theatre, London
- The Respectable Wedding (2007) director: Joe Hill-Gibbins, Young Vic Theatre, London
- Nakamitsu (2007) director: Jonathan Munby Gate Theatre, London
- The Pain and The Itch (2007) director: Dominic Cooke, Royal Court, London
- Hergé's Adventures Of Tintin (2005) director: Rufus Norris, Young Vic production, Barbican Theatre and Playhouse Theatre, London
- Cymbeline (2003) director: Dominic Cooke, Royal Shakespeare Company

== Broadway work (selected) ==
- Stranger Things: The First Shadow (2025) directed by Stephen Daldry and Justin Martin, Marquis Theatre, Broadway
- Caroline, Or Change (2021) director: Michael Longhurst, Studio 54, New York
- The Inheritance (2019) director: Stephen Daldry, Ethel Barrymore Theatre, Broadway, New York (co-sound-designed with Christopher Reid)
- Skylight (2015) director: Stephen Daldry, Golden Theater, Broadway
- The Audience (2015) director: Stephen Daldry, Shoenfeld Theater, Broadway
- Mary Stuart (2009) - director: Phyllida Lloyd, Broadhurst Theatre
- Billy Elliot The Musical - director: Stephen Daldry, all productions, including Imperial Theatre (2008); Her Majesty's Theatre, Melbourne; Capitol Theatre, Sydney; Circustheater, Scheveningen, Netherlands and Victoria Palace Theatre, London.
- Les Liaisons Dangereuses (2008) director: Rufus Norris, American Airlines Theatre

== Other ==
- Local Hero (2022) director: Daniel Evans with music by Mark Knopfler, Minerva Theatre, Chichester
- Children of Nora (2020) director and writer: Robert Icke, Internationaal Theater Amsterdam
- This Is My Family (2019) director: Daniel Evans, Minerva Theatre, Chichester Festival
- Local Hero (2019) director: John Crowley, with music by Mark Knopfler, Lyceum Theatre, Edinburgh
- The Jungle (2018–19), director: Stephen Daldry and Justin Martin, St Ann's Warehouse, New York, Curran Theatre, San Francisco
- Caroline, Or Change (2017) director: by Michael Longhurst, Chichester Festival Theatre
- A Streetcar Named Desire (2016) director: Benedict Andrews, St Ann's Warehouse, Brooklyn, New York
- The Bee (2012) director: Hideki Noda, Japan Society, New York and world tour
- Company (2011) by Stephen Sondheim director: Jonathan Munby, Sheffield Crucible
- The Cherry Orchard and The Winter's Tale (2009) director: Sam Mendes, Brooklyn Academy of Music, New York, and Old Vic Theatre, London
- Crestfall by Mark O'Rowe (2003) director: Garry Hynes, Gate Theatre, Dublin (2003)

== Awards and nominations ==
- Guys And Dolls: WhatsOnStage Nomination for Best Sound Design 2024
- Stranger Things: The First Shadow: Tony Award for Best Sound Design of a Play 2025, WhatsOnStage nomination for Best Sound Design 2024, Olivier Award nomination for Best Sound Design 2024, Drama Desk Award winner for Outstanding Sound Design of a Play.
- The Inheritance: Drama Desk Award 2019, Oliver Award nomination 2019, Tony Award nomination 2019
- Amadeus: Oliver Award nomination for Best Sound Design 2017
- One Man, Two Guvnors: Tony Award nomination for Best Sound Design 2012
- Saint Joan: Olivier Award for Best Sound Design 2008
- Billy Elliot The Musical: Tony Award for Best Sound Design 2009, Olivier Award for Best Sound Design 2006, Helpmann Award (Australia) nomination for Best Sound Design 2008, Drama Desk Award for Best Sound Design, Broadwayworld.com Fan's Choice Award for Best Sound Design
- Festen: Evening Standard Award for Best Design 2004 and Olivier Award nomination for Best Sound Design 2005
- The Pillowman: Drama Desk Award for Outstanding Sound Design 2005, Olivier Award nomination for Best Sound Design 2004
- Crestfall: Irish Times Theatre Awards nomination Judges' Special Award 2004
- Far Away: Lucille Lortel Award nomination 2004
- The Chairs: Drama Desk Award nomination for Outstanding Sound Design 2003
- Four Baboons Adoring The Sun: Drama Desk Award for Outstanding Sound Design 1993
