= Peter Hylenski =

American sound designer

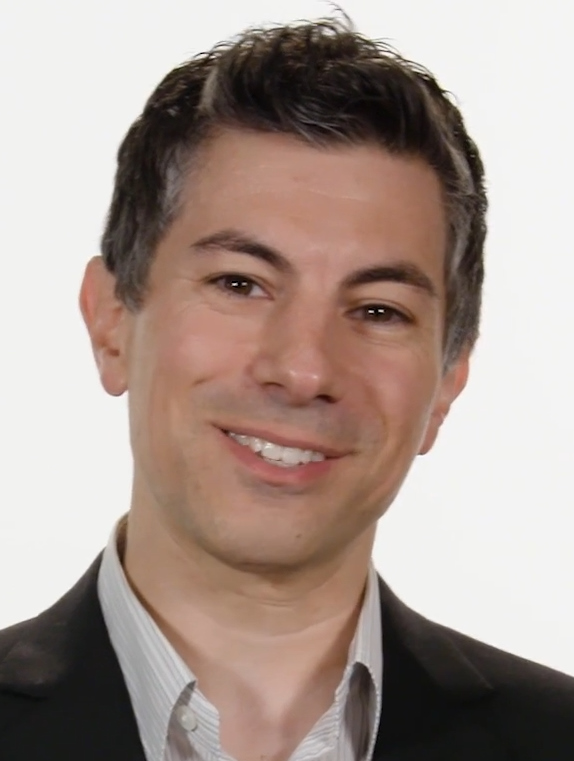
- Hylenski in 2018
- Born: 1975 or 1976 (age 50–51); Danbury, Connecticut, United States
- Education: Carnegie Mellon University (BFA)
- Occupation: Sound designer
- Notable work: {{ubl|Moulin Rouge! The Musical|Rocky the Musical|Once on This Island|After Midnight|Beetlejuice}|The Greatest Showman the musical}
- Awards: Tony Award for Best Sound Design

Peter Hylenski (born 1975 or 1976) is an American stage sound designer. He has been nominated for the Tony Award for Best Sound Design ten times, holding the record for most nominations in the category, and has won once, at the 74th Tony Awards with Moulin Rouge! The Musical.

== Career ==
Hylenski was born in Danbury, Connecticut, to Peter J. Hylenski, a design engineer, and Angela Hylenski, a secretary at Danbury High School. He attended Danbury High, where he was in charge of the theatre program's technical design as a senior. He went on to study at Carnegie Mellon University, from which he graduated in 1997. Hylenski's first professional role was at age 18 as the sound designer for a Las Vegas run of Starlight Express. Early in his career, Hylenski worked in sound design both in the United States and abroad, with credits in Broadway, West End, and Cirque du Soleil productions. He was nominated for the Laurence Olivier Award for Best Sound Design for Ragtime in 2004, the first year it was awarded.

In addition to his win for Moulin Rouge!, Hylenski has been nominated for a Tony Award for Once on This Island, After Midnight, Beetlejuice, King Kong, Motown: The Musical, Rock of Ages, The Scottsboro Boys, Just in Time, and Maybe Happy Ending. Outside of musicals, he has worked with Dave Chappelle, Regina Spektor, and Criss Angel. In an interview for trade magazine Live Design about his work on Rocky the Musical, Hylenski described his sound design philosophy as based around the show's story and defended the use of anachronism in musical scores as a design decision. He has also ascribed a major role to the actor's interpretation of a character as being integral to subtle differences in sound design between different runs of a play.

Hylenski lives in New York City and owns a second home in New Fairfield, Connecticut. He is married to Suzanne Hylenski, a dancer and wellness coach from Essex in the United Kingdom, whom he met while working as an associate sound designer on a European tour of Fosse.
