= Stranger Things: The First Shadow =

2023 play by Kate Trefry

- Promotional poster
- Original language: English
- Written by: Kate Trefry
- Story by: The Duffer Brothers; Jack Thorne; Kate Trefry
- Based on: Stranger Things by The Duffer Brothers
- Genre: Drama; Science fiction
- Setting: Hawkins, Indiana

Premiere
- Date: December 14, 2023
- Place: Phoenix Theatre, West End, London
- Directed by: Stephen Daldry; Justin Martin
- Official website

Stranger Things: The First Shadow is a play written by Kate Trefry from an original story by the Duffer Brothers, Jack Thorne, and Trefry. The story serves as a prequel to the events of the television series Stranger Things, exploring the backstory of Henry Creel before he became the antagonist Vecna. The production, directed by Stephen Daldry and Justin Martin, previewed on November 17, 2023, and officially opened on December 14 at the Phoenix Theatre in London's West End. The play began a run on Broadway at the Marquis Theatre, New York City, on April 22, 2025. In an interview with Variety, the Duffer Brothers confirmed that the play is canon to the original series, with the series finale referencing events of the play. Both productions of the play in the West End and on Broadway announced their closing dates on June 9, 2026.

== Plot ==
=== Prologue ===
In 1943, the United States holds secret experiments involving the USS Eldridge, hoping to use a force field to turn the ship invisible and undetectable to the Germans. However, the ship is instead transported to the Abyss, where most of the crew are killed by strange humanoid creatures.

=== Chapter One: The Girl from Nowhere ===
In 1959, the Creel family – consisting of Victor, his wife Virginia, and their children: older son, Henry, and younger daughter, Alice – move to a new home in Hawkins, Indiana. Henry is tormented, mentally disturbed and in possession of remarkable psychokinetic abilities. Henry struggles to make friends upon joining Hawkins High School; despite that, he quickly forms a connection with Patty Newby, daughter of the school principal. Patty convinces Henry that his powers are not evil, and that he should be able to control them and use them for good. Henry creates a "vision" for Patty, where she can express herself through song while being supported by everyone around her. They form a romantic bond, meeting each other every day after school, and eventually kiss. Meanwhile, Joyce Maldonado attempts to put on a school production of Dark of the Moon.

While in the attic alone, Henry is overcome by the influence of a shadowy presence – his mind enters what he calls "the battlefield", from where he proceeds to kill several animals, including Claudia Yount's cat Prancer. (Note: Claudia later becomes Claudia Henderson, and is the mother of Dustin Henderson.) Henry becomes haunted by visions of a humanoid monster; he is terrified that he will be made to kill Patty. Following this, Patty's adoptive brother Bob teams up with Joyce and her friend James Hopper Jr. to investigate the animal killings.

Patty convinces Henry to use his powers to track down her biological mother. As he does this, and while inside the void, he loses control and is once again visited by the monster. This frightens Patty, and when her father walks in and witnesses the scene, he is attacked and almost killed (by Henry controlled by the presence). Patty is able to encourage Henry to fight back by telling him that she believes he is good and that she loves him. Henry responds that he loves her too and is able to end the situation, but not before Patty's father is blinded and seriously injured. Mr. Newby is sent to the hospital, and Henry's mother Virginia sends Henry to Dr. Martin Brenner. It is revealed that she was supplied with drugs by Brenner; under the influence of these drugs, Virginia told Brenner everything about her son. When Mr. Newby wakes up, he tells Patty that Henry saved him from the monster. Mr. Newby draws a picture of the shadowy entity on a piece of paper and gives it to his daughter: it's the Mind Flayer.

=== Chapter Two: Captain Midnight ===
Brenner takes Henry to Hawkins National Laboratory, where the two discuss the past: It is explained that Brenner's father was the captain and sole survivor of the USS Eldridge experiment, who returned to the normal world with significant injuries and a unique blood type; the elder Brenner later revealed the truth about these events on his deathbed. Dr. Brenner later established the Nevada Experiment, an attempt to reproduce what had happened to the Eldridge.

One of Brenner's fellow scientists defected and became a spy for the Soviet Union and stole key technology and transported it to a Nevada cave. At this time, a very young Henry and the Creels lived nearby, in Rachel, Nevada. While exploring the Nevadan caves and playing with a spyglass, Henry stumbled across the stolen technology when it unexpectedly activated, transporting him and the defecting scientist to Abyss.

In Abyss, Henry was exposed to the influence of the shadowy entity. Though Henry returned home after 12 hours, he now possessed a unique blood type and had a changed personality. Brenner was later able to track Henry down thanks to Henry dropping his spyglass in the caves.

Henry, using a sensory deprivation chamber, shows Brenner a humanoid creature through the Void. Brenner sees this creature displayed on a screen, and Henry convulses. Brenner then tries to force Henry to kill a prisoner, but Henry breaks down and ends up stabbing two guards. After this, Henry tells Brenner that he can let him go. Brenner understands that the boy is devoted to someone and therefore cannot kill; later Brenner realizes that this person is Patty and vows to find and kill her.

Henry returns home, but senses that his family is not happy about his return. Using his powers, he reads his mother's thoughts and understands that she wants to send him back to Brenner. Henry gives in to the shadowy entity's influence; while possessed, he kills Virginia and Alice before falling unconscious, with Victor also falling unconscious.

Awakening in dazed confusion some hours later, Henry walks to Hawkins High School to save Patty from Brenner, where the performance of Dark of the Moon is about to begin. Atop the stage rafters, Henry reunites with Patty only to be interrupted by Brenner, who appears on the other side of the stage. Brenner says that Patty is his weakness, and Patty tells Henry not to listen to him. As Henry struggles for control, he informs Patty that he managed to find her birth mother, a singer at the Stardust Casino in Las Vegas. Feeling overwhelmed, the shadowy entity once again takes control of Henry, and Henry throws Patty off the rafters, seemingly killing her. Brenner takes Henry back to Hawkins Lab, Patty is taken to the hospital, and Victor Creel is accused of the murder of Virginia and Alice based on Joyce, Bob, and Jim's assumptions about the animal killings.

In 1963, Joyce and Jim bid farewell to each other as the latter is shipped off to fight in Vietnam.

=== Epilogue ===
Some years later, an older Henry is back at Hawkins Lab and is restrained. Using the Void, Henry discovers that Patty survived her fall and was discharged from the hospital, though now needing to walk with a cane. Henry observes her in Las Vegas, where she meets her mother backstage after a performance at the Stardust. Patty and her mother recognize each other and embrace.

Brenner informs Henry that the blood transfusions administered to the test subjects have been successful, with Brenner freeing Henry from his restraints as a reward. In the Rainbow Room, Henry is introduced to Eleven, one of the children. Lightning flashes and the silhouette of Vecna appears on the back wall.

== Background ==
In July 2022, it was revealed that a spin-off stage play and spin-off series to Stranger Things were in the works. The stage play was produced by Sonia Friedman, directed by Stephen Daldry and Justin Martin, and written by Kate Trefry, based on an original story by the Duffer Brothers, Jack Thorne and Trefry. As they worked on the play and the show's fourth season, the Duffers came up with the idea that Dr. Brenner had used Henry Creel's blood to create more psychic children (of which Eleven was the most successful manifestation), to serve as living weapons during the Cold War era. The Duffers started to explore the concept, tying it into the show's main antagonist, because they found it interesting to explore where Eleven's powers came from.

== Production history ==
=== West End (2023–2026) ===
On March 1, 2023, the show's title was announced as Stranger Things: The First Shadow. The show began previews on November 17, 2023, and officially opened on December 14, 2023, at the Phoenix Theatre.

The production is co-directed by Stephen Daldry and Justin Martin. Set design is by Miriam Buether; costume design by Brigitte Reiffenstuel; lighting design by Jon Clark; sound design by Paul Arditti; illusion design and visual effects by Jamie Harrison and Chris Fisher; video design and visual effects by 59 Productions; movement direction by Coral Messam; wigs, hair and make-up design by Campbell Young Associates; casting by Jessica Ronane Casting CDG; and international casting consultancy by Jim Carnahan. Gary Beestone for Gary Beestone Associates is technical director.

On September 20, 2023, the full cast was announced. The company features Oscar Lloyd as James Hopper Jr., Isabella Pappas as Joyce Maldonado, Chris Buckley as Bob Newby, Louis McCartney as Henry Creel (for his stage debut), Patrick Vaill as Dr. Brenner, Ella Karuna Williams as Patty Newby, Michael Jibson as Victor Creel, and Lauren Ward as Virginia Creel.

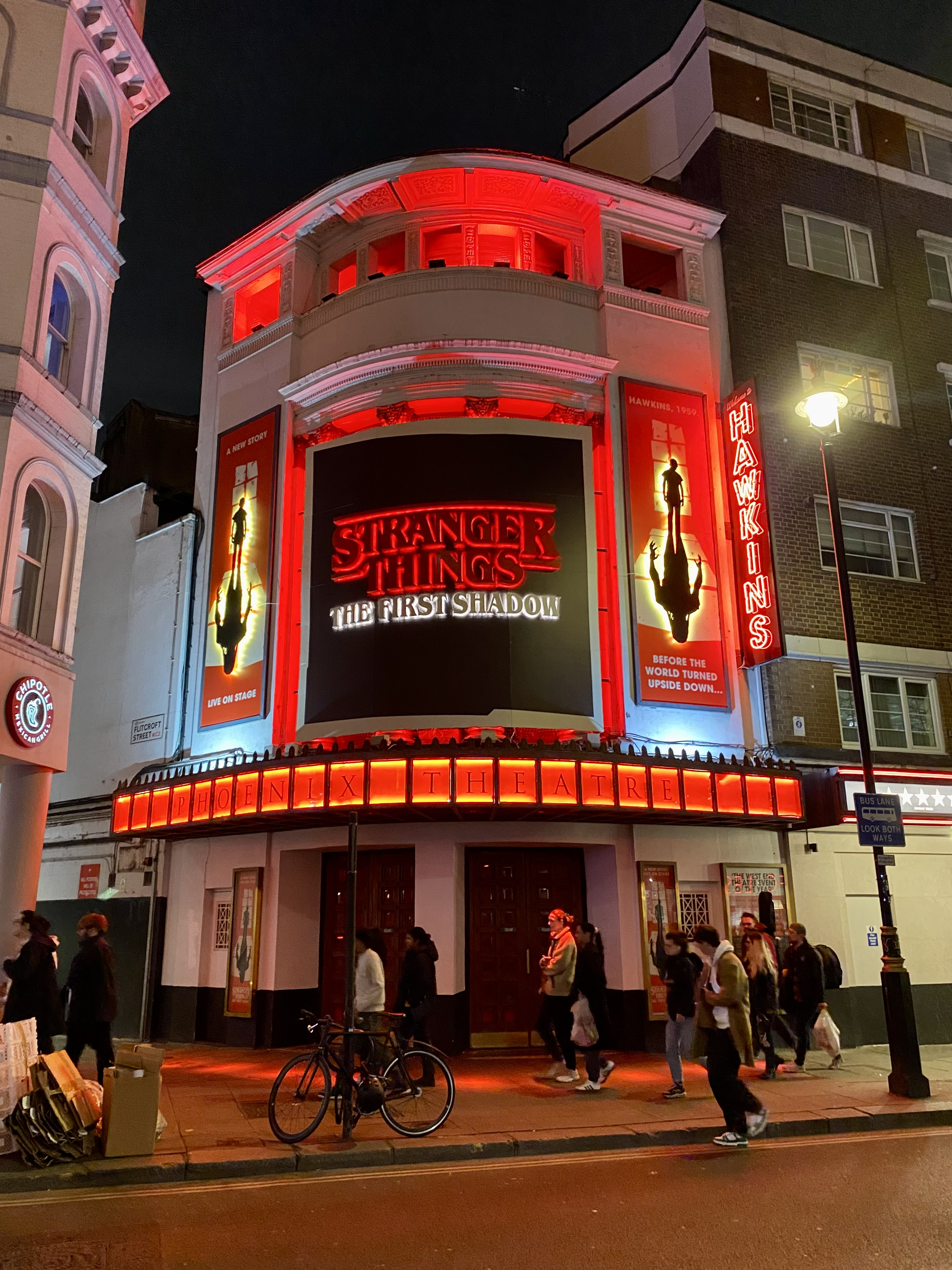
Stranger Things: The First Shadow at the Phoenix Theatre, London, in April 2024

On April 15, 2025, a documentary called Behind the Curtain: Stranger Things: The First Shadow, about the making of the play and its debut in the West End, was released on Netflix.

In June 2025, director Justin Martin said that the audiences were very noisy compared to traditional theatre audiences. Surveys revealed that around 60 per cent of them had never been to the theatre, so they "eat popcorn throughout and just respond in a really natural way".

On June 9, 2026, it was announced that the show would conclude its run at the Phoenix Theatre in the West End on December 27, 2026. In September 2026, it was reported that The Popinjay Cavalier would move into the Phoenix Theatre after Stranger Things: The First Shadow closes.

=== Broadway (2025–2027) ===
On August 6, 2024, it was announced that the show would transfer to Broadway in early 2025. Previews began at the Marquis Theatre on March 28, 2025, while the play's official opening date was on April 22, 2025. Louis McCartney was announced to be reprising the role of Henry Creel for the Broadway transfer in 2025. McCartney was nominated for Best Performance by an Actor in a Leading Role in a Play at the 2025 Tony Awards for his portrayal. Nicholas Eldridge was initially cast as Bob Newby but was replaced by Juan Carlos prior to debut.

On June 9, 2026, it was announced that the show would conclude its run on Broadway on January 3, 2027.

== Original cast and characters ==
Character	West End	Broadway
Character	2023	2025
Henry Creel	Louis McCartney	Louis McCartney
James Hopper Jr.	Oscar Lloyd	Burke Swanson
Joyce Maldonado	Isabella Pappas	Alison Jaye
Bob Newby	Chris Buckley	Juan Carlos
Dr. Brenner	Patrick Vaill	Alex Breaux
Alan Munson	Max Harwood	Eric Weigand
Patty Newby	Ella Karuna Williams	Gabrielle Nevaeh
Victor Creel	Michael Jibson	T.R. Knight
Virginia Creel	Lauren Ward	Rosie Benton
Alice Creel	Imogen Turner; Faith Delaney; Anika Boyle; Lily Crawford	Poppy Lovell; Azalea Wolfe
Chief Hopper	Shane Attwooll	Ted Koch
Lonnie Byers	Chase Brown	Logan Gould
Charles Sinclair	Ammar Duffus	Robert T. Cunningham
Ted Wheeler	Gilles Geary	Jamie Martin Mann
Karen Childress	Florence Guy	Dora Dolphin
Principal Newby	Matthew Pidgeon	Andrew Hovelson
Walter Henderson	Calum Ross	Ian Dolley
Claudia Yount	Maisie Norma Seaton	Shea Grant
Sue Anderson	Kemi Awoderu	Ayana Cymone

=== Notable replacements ===
==== West End (2023–present) ====
- Henry Creel: Paddy Bever
- Victor Creel: Andrew Langtree
- Virginia Creel: Lauren O'Neil
- Chief Hopper: Andrew Whipp
- Principal Newby: Rufus Wright

==== Broadway (2025–present) ====
- Henry Creel: Jamie Campbell Bower (epilogue; one night only)

== Reception ==
Arifa Akbar called the London show "breathtaking theatre" in The Guardian, while Andrzej Lukowski of Timeout wrote that it suffered from "dramatic bloat and tonal inconsistency". Chris Jones of the New York Daily News described the Broadway incarnation as "terrifying and brilliant, both at the same time." Meanwhile, Sam Adams in Slate called it "the worst Broadway show I've ever seen", and Houman Bareka of The New York Times wrote, "The real spectacle here is that of a franchise eating itself." Sara Holdren gave The First Shadow a mixed review in Vulture, calling it "so unrelentingly absurd that it's hard to be mad at".

== Awards and nominations ==
=== 2024 West End production ===
Year	Award Ceremony	Category	Nominee	Result
2024	Laurence Olivier Awards	Best Entertainment or Comedy Play		Won
2024	Laurence Olivier Awards	Best Director	Stephen Daldry (Director), Justin Martin (co-director)	Nominated
2024	Laurence Olivier Awards	Best Lighting Design	Jon Clark	Nominated
2024	Laurence Olivier Awards	Best Set Design	Miriam Buether (Set Design), 59 Productions (Video Design)	Won
2024	Laurence Olivier Awards	Best Sound Design	Paul Arditti	Nominated
2024	WhatsOnStage Awards	Best New Play		Won
2024	WhatsOnStage Awards	Best Professional Debut Performance	Louis McCartney	Nominated
2024	WhatsOnStage Awards	Best Casting Direction	Jessica Ronane	Nominated
2024	WhatsOnStage Awards	Best Lighting Design	Jon Clark	Nominated
2024	WhatsOnStage Awards	Best Set Design	Miriam Buether	Nominated
2024	WhatsOnStage Awards	Best Sound Design	Paul Arditti	Nominated
2024	WhatsOnStage Awards	Best Video Design	59 Productions	Nominated
2024	WhatsOnStage Awards	Best Graphic Design	The Creative Partnership	Nominated

=== 2025 Broadway production ===
Year	Award Ceremony	Category	Nominee	Result
2025	Tony Awards	Best Performance by a Leading Actor in a Play	Louis McCartney	Nominated
2025	Tony Awards	Best Scenic Design of a Play	Miriam Buether and 59 Productions	Won
2025	Tony Awards	Best Costume Design of a Play	Brigitte Reiffenstuel	Nominated
2025	Tony Awards	Best Lighting Design of a Play	Jon Clark	Won
2025	Tony Awards	Best Sound Design of a Play	Paul Arditti	Won
2025	Tony Awards	Special Tony Award	Jamie Harrison, Chris Fisher, Gary Beestone, and Edward Pierce (for illusions and technical effects)	Won
2025	Drama League Awards	Outstanding Production of a Play		Nominated
2025	Drama League Awards	Distinguished Performance	Louis McCartney	Nominated
2025	Drama Desk Award	Outstanding Lead Performance in a Play	Louis McCartney	Nominated
2025	Drama Desk Award	Outstanding Direction of a Play	Stephen Daldry and Justin Martin	Nominated
2025	Drama Desk Award	Outstanding Scenic Design of a Play	Miriam Buether, and Jamie Harrison and Chris Fisher (illusions and visual effects)	Won
2025	Drama Desk Award	Outstanding Lighting Design of a Play	Jon Clark	Won
2025	Drama Desk Award	Outstanding Sound Design of a Play	Paul Arditti	Won
2025	Outer Critics Circle Awards	Outstanding New Broadway Play		Nominated
2025	Outer Critics Circle Awards	Outstanding Lead Performer in a Broadway Play	Louis McCartney	Nominated
2025	Outer Critics Circle Awards	Outstanding Direction of a Play	Stephen Daldry and Justin Martin	Nominated
2025	Outer Critics Circle Awards	Outstanding Scenic Design	Miriam Buether, Jamie Harrison, and Chris Fisher	Won
2025	Outer Critics Circle Awards	Outstanding Lighting Design	Jon Clark	Won
2025	Outer Critics Circle Awards	Outstanding Sound Design	Paul Arditti	Won
2025	Outer Critics Circle Awards	Outstanding Projection Design	59 Productions	Nominated

== Netflix release ==
In February 2026, Variety reported that Netflix was set to film The First Shadow for release on the platform.
