= Drama Desk Award for Outstanding Sound Design =

American theatre award

- Awarded for: Outstanding Sound Design
- Location: New York City
- Country: United States
- Presented by: Drama Desk
- First award: 1980
- Final award: 2009
- Website: dramadesk.org (defunct)

The Drama Desk Award for Outstanding Sound Design was an annual award presented by Drama Desk in recognition of achievements in the theatre across collective Broadway, off-Broadway and off-off-Broadway productions in New York City. The award was first presented in 1980, for work in either a play or musical production. It was retired after the 2009 ceremony, replaced by separate play and musical categories (Outstanding Sound Design in a Musical and Outstanding Sound Design in a Play).

Paul Arditti and Dan Moses Schreier hold the record for most wins in the category before its retirement, with three wins each, followed by Steven Canyon Kennedy with two wins. Mark Bennett leads the nominees with the most nominations, netting eight.

== Winners and nominees ==
Key

and bold indicates the winner.

=== 1980s ===
Year	Designer	Production	Ref.
1980
1980	**Norman L. Berman**	**Strider**	
1980	Richard Peaslee	Teibele and Her Demon	
1980	Stanley Silverman	Bent	
1981-1984	—N/a		
1985
1985	**John DiFusco**	**Tracers**	
1985	**Nigel Hess**	**Cyrano de Bergerac**	
1985	**Nigel Hess**	**Much Ado About Nothing**	
1985	John Malkovich	Balm in Gilead	
1986
1986	**Otts Munderloh**	**The Search for Signs of Intelligent Life in the Universe**	
1986	Tom Morse	Execution of Justice	
1986	The Red Clay Ramblers	A Lie of the Mind	

=== 1990s ===
Year	Designer	Production	Ref.
1991
1991	**Aural Fixation**	**Red Scare on Sunset**	
1991	Olu Dara	Let Me Live	
1991	John Gromada	Machinal	
1991	Janet Kalas	The Good Times Are Killing Me	
1992
1992	**Paul Arditti**	**Four Baboons Adoring the Sun**	
1992	Mark Bennett and Jim van Bergen	Lypsinka! A Day in the Life	
1992	Stewart Werner	Lips Together, Teeth Apart	
1993
1993	**Steve Canyon Kennedy**	**The Who's Tommy**	
1993	Rodrigo Bachler-Klein	Les Atrides	
1993	Dan Moses Schreier	Spic-O-Rama	
1993	Richard Woodbury	Wings	
1994
1994	**John A. Leonard**	**Medea**	
1994	Mark Bennett	The Lights	
1994	T. Richard Fitzgerald	Beauty and the Beast	
1994	John Gromada	Twilight: Los Angeles, 1992	
1995	—N/a		
1996
1996	**Dan Moses Schreier**	**Floyd Collins**	
1996	David Van Tieghem	The Grey Zone	
1997
1997	**John Gromada**	**The Skriker**	
1997	Dan Moses Schreier	God's Heart	
1997	Marc Anthony Thompson	A Huey P. Newton Story	
1998
1998	**Tony Meola**	**The Lion King**	
1998	Paul Arditti	The Chairs	
1998	Mark Bennett	A View from the Bridge	
1998	Thomas Cabaniss	Mamba's Daughters	
1998	Rinde Eckert and Gina Leishman	Thérèse Raquin	
1998	David Van Tieghem	Scotland Road	
1999
1999	**Christopher Shutt**	**Not About Nightingales**	
1999	John Collins and James Johnson	House/Lights	
1999	Jonathan Deans	Parade	
1999	Fergus O'Hare	Electra	
1999	David Van Tieghem	Stop Kiss	
1999	Darron L. West	Bob	

=== 2000s ===
Year	Designer	Production	Ref.
2000
2000	**Jamie Mereness**	**Charlie Victor Romeo**	
2000	Marc Gwinn	Coyote on a Fence	
2000	Rob Milburn and Michael Bodeen	Space	
2000	Darron L. West	Chesapeake	
2000	Darron L. West	Y2K	
2001
2001	**Christopher Shutt**	**Mnemonic**	
2001	Mark Bennett and Michael Creason	Dogeaters	
2001	Bruce Ellman	Comic Potential	
2001	Gregory Kostroff	Lypsinka the Boxed Set	
2001	Mic Pool and David Bullard	The Unexpected Man	
2001	Jerry Vager	Up Against the Wind	
2002
2002	**Dan Moses Schreier**	**Into the Woods**	
2002	John Collins, Geoff Abbas and Jim Dawson	To You, the Birdie!	
2002	Mark Huang	Cressida Among the Greeks	
2002	Scott Lehrer	Franny's Way	
2002	Matthew Spiro	36 Views	
2002	David Van Tieghem	The Glory of Living	
2003
2003	**Acme Sound Partners**	**La Bohème**	
2003	Mark Bennett	Julius Caesar	
2003	Mark Bennett	Golda's Balcony	
2003	Francois Bergeron	Cirque du Soleil: Varekai	
2003	Janet Kalas	Take Me Out	
2003	Mel Mercier and David Meschter	Medea	
2004
2004	**Dan Moses Schreier**	**Assassins**	
2004	Mark Bennett	Henry IV	
2004	Scott Jennings	Ramayana 2K3	
2004	Brian Ronan	Bug	
2004	David Van Tieghem	The Stendhal Syndrome	
2005
2005	**Paul Arditti**	**The Pillowman**	
2005	Acme Sound Partners	The Light in the Piazza	
2005	Jill DuBoff	Miss Julie	
2005	Jill DuBoff	Spatter Pattern	
2005	Jeff Lorenz	Frankenstein	
2005	Darron L. West	Hot 'n' Throbbing	
2006
2006	**Steve Canyon Kennedy**	**Jersey Boys**	
2006	Acme Sound Partners	See What I Wanna See	
2006	Acme Sound Partners	The Drowsy Chaperone	
2006	Brian Ronan	Grey Gardens	
2006	Brian Ronan	The Pajama Game	
2006	Dan Moses Schreier	Sweeney Todd: The Demon Barber of Fleet Street	
2007
2007	**Gregory Clarke**	**Journey's End**	
2007	Acme Sound Partners	In the Heights	
2007	Mark Bennett	The Coast of Utopia	
2007	Duncan Edwards	LoveMusik	
2007	Frank Gaeta	Dai (enough)	
2007	Richard Woodbury	Talk Radio	
2008
2008	**Scott Lehrer**	**South Pacific**	
2008	Adam Cork	Macbeth	
2008	Jorge Cousineau	Opus	
2008	Joseph Fosco	The Conversation	
2008	Mic Pool	The 39 Steps	
2008	Tony Smolenski, IV	Adding Machine	
2009
2009	**Paul Arditti**	**Billy Elliot the Musical**	
2009	Acme Sound Partners	Irving Berlin's White Christmas	
2009	Gregory Clarke	Equus	
2009	John Gromada	Shipwrecked! An Entertainment, The Amazing Adventures of Louis de Rougemont	
2009	André J. Pluess	33 Variations	
2009	John Shivers	9 to 5	

== Multiple wins ==
3 wins

- Paul Arditti
- Dan Moses Schreier

2 wins

- Steve Canyon Kennedy

== Multiple nominations ==
8 nominations

- Mark Bennett

6 nominations

- Dan Moses Schreier
- Acme Sound Partners

5 nominations

- David Van Tieghem

4 nominations

- John Gromada
- Paul Arditti
- Darron L. West

3 nominations

- Brian Ronan

2 nominations

- Janet Kalas
- Richard Woodbury
- Steve Canyon Kennedy
- John Collins
- Mic Pool
- Scott Lehrer
- Jill DuBoff
- Gregory Clarke

== See also ==
- Laurence Olivier Award for Best Sound Design
- Tony Award for Best Sound Design
- Drama Desk Award for Outstanding Sound Design in a Musical
- Drama Desk Award for Outstanding Sound Design in a Play
