= Jessica Paz =

American sound designer

- Born: Brooklyn, New York, U.S.
- Occupation: Sound designer
- Years active: 2007–present
- Notable work: Hadestown

Jessica Paz is an American sound designer, most notable for her work on Broadway and off-Broadway. She is the first woman to win the Tony Award for Best Sound Design.

== Career ==
Paz is currently represented on Broadway in Anaïs Mitchell's Hadestown at the Walter Kerr Theatre and on the US National tour of the Neil Diamond musical A Beautiful Noise. Paz had previously collaborated with famed director Susan Stroman on the play POTUS. She worked as front of house engineer for the Preservation Hall Jazz Band, Antibalas, Femi Kuti, Lady A, Candy Shop Boys and more. She also worked as an associate sound designer in Disaster!, Dear Evan Hansen, Bandstand and more.

Paz has been a lecturer in Sound Design at Princeton University and was a faculty advisor for Princeton University's production of Next To Normal. She is a member of the United States Institute for Theatre Technology (USITT), SoundGirls, Women's Audio Mission, TSDCA and IATSE Local USA 829.

== Selected theatre credits ==
=== As sound designer ===
- Kiss My Aztec, Berkeley Repertory Theatre (2022)
- Little Shop of Horrors, Westside Theatre (2019)
- Hadestown, Broadway (2019)
- Much Ado About Nothing, Delacorte Theater (2019)
- Kiss My Aztec, Berkeley Repertory Theatre (2019)
- Miss You Like Hell, The Public Theater (2018)
- SCKBSTD, Virginia Stage Company (2011)

== Awards and nominations ==
Year	Nominated work	Category	Result	Notes
2019	Hadestown	Tony Award for Best Sound Design	Won	
2019	Hadestown	Drama Desk Award for Outstanding Sound Design in a Musical	Won	
2019	Hadestown	Outer Critics Circle Award for Outstanding Sound Design	Nominated	
