= Clive Goodwin =

British sound designer

Clive Goodwin is a British sound designer. He was the sound designer for Once (musical) during the production's workshop at the American Repertory Theater, again for the 2011 premiere at New York Theatre Workshop, and then for the 2012 Broadway production, for which he won the 2012 Tony Award for Best Sound Design of a Musical.
