= John Gromada =

American composer

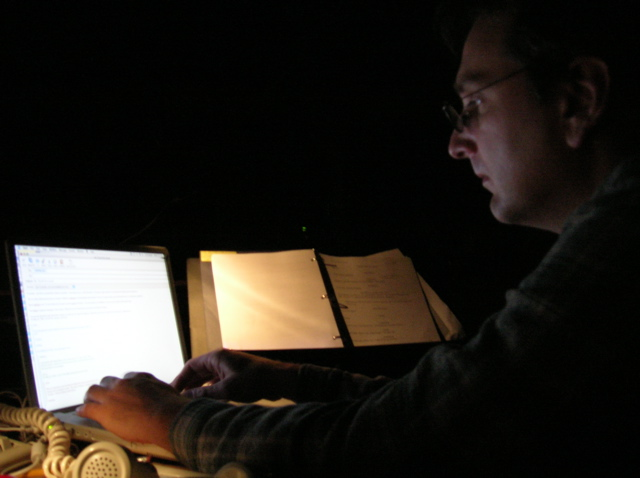
- John Gromada at rehearsal, 2004
- Born: February 22, 1964 (age 61); United States
- Occupations: Composer, sound designer

John Gromada (born February 22, 1964) is an American composer and sound designer. He is best known for his many scores for theatrical productions in New York on and off-Broadway and in regional theatres. Broadway plays he has scored include the 2014 production of The Elephant Man, starring Bradley Cooper, The Trip to Bountiful with Cicely Tyson, Gore Vidal's The Best Man, Seminar by Theresa Rebeck, Next Fall, Chazz Palminteri's A Bronx Tale, David Auburn's The Columnist and Proof, Lisa Kron's Well, Rabbit Hole, and A Few Good Men; revivals of Prelude to a Kiss, Summer and Smoke, Twelve Angry Men, Torch Song, and A Streetcar Named Desire. His score for the nine-hour production of Horton Foote's The Orphans' Home Cycle was featured at the Hartford Stage Company and Signature Theatre in New York. Gromada also designed the sound for the Broadway production of Bruce Norris' Tony award-winning play, Clybourne Park.

Gromada first emerged on the theatre scene in the late 1980s creating powerful soundscores blending original music and abstract sound design. His industrial music score for Sophie Treadwell's Machinal at the New York Shakespeare Festival earned him a Village Voice Obie Award in 1991. In 1996 he won the Drama Desk Award for Outstanding Sound Design for his musique concrète soundscore for Caryl Churchill's The Skriker, directed by Mark Wing-Davey for NYSF. In 2009 His work on Donald Margulies' Shipwrecked! An Entertainment — The Amazing Adventures of Louis de Rougemont (As Told by Himself) earned him a Lucille Lortel Award, and In 2012 he won another Drama Desk Award for his work on The Best Man. In 2013 Gromada was nominated for a Tony Award for Best Sound Design of a Play for his work on The Trip to Bountiful.

In recent years he has also become known also for his lyrical, acoustic chamber scores, particularly for his work on the plays of Tennessee Williams. Williams plays he has scored include The Glass Menagerie, A Streetcar Named Desire, Sweet Bird of Youth, The Night of the Iguana, Camino Real, Cat on a Hot Tin Roof, Summer and Smoke, A Lovely Sunday for Creve Coeur, The Milk Train Doesn't Stop Here Anymore and Red Devil Battery Sign.

In 2009 Gromada began to write the score for a new music theatre piece based on Michael Pollan's best-selling book, The Botany of Desire, which had a first workshop in Berkeley in April 2009.

In the summer of 2011, his score for the Public Theater's production of Measure for Measure was heard at the Delacorte Theatre in Central Park. The production was directed by David Esbjornson. Music from this and other productions has been released on iTunes and other digital music services.

Gromada composed the theme music for the new ITV television series, The Interrogators, on the Biography Channel, and also composed an original score for the Lifetime network's 2014 film adaptation of The Trip to Bountiful, directed by Michael Wilson and starring Cicely Tyson and Vanessa Williams. Gromada lives in New York with his wife Barbara and two daughters, Aniela and Sylvie.
