= Isabel Toledo =

Cuban-American fashion designer (1960–2019)

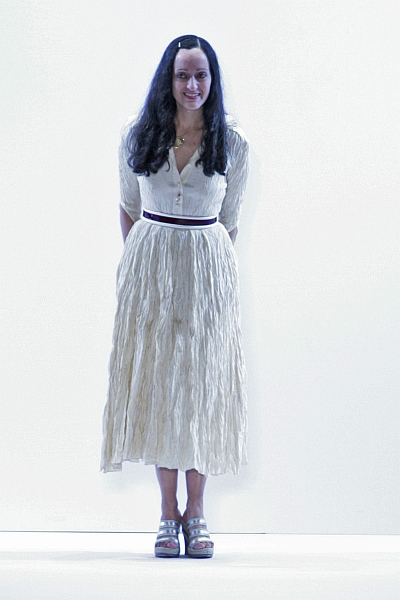
- Isabel Toledo at the Anne Klein fashion show, photo by Ed Kavishe, Fashion Wire Press
- Born: Maria Isabel Izquierdo; April 9, 1961; Camajuaní, Cuba
- Died: August 26, 2019 (aged 59); New York City, U.S.
- Education: Fashion Institute of Technology
- Spouse: Ruben Toledo (m. 1984)
- Awards: Cooper-Hewitt National Design Award, 2005

Isabel Toledo (born Maria Isabel Izquierdo; April 9, 1960 – August 26, 2019) was a Cuban-American fashion designer based in New York City. She was widely recognized in the fashion industry for her attention to craftsmanship and the "sophisticated simplicity" of her garments.

== Biography ==
Toledo was born Maria Isabel Izquierdo in Camajuaní, Cuba. Raised in West New York, New Jersey, after settling in the United States at the age of eight, she attended Memorial High School, where she met her future husband and collaborator, Ruben Toledo, whom she married in 1984. Toledo told CNN that she started sewing at age eight because, "I couldn’t find anything I loved." She attended the Fashion Institute of Technology (NY) and Parsons School of Design (NY), where she studied painting, ceramics, and fashion design. She left Parsons in 1979, then graduated to become an intern under Diana Vreeland at the Costume Institute of the Metropolitan Museum of Art.

Toledo died from breast cancer at a hospital in Manhattan on August 26, 2019.

== Career ==
Toledo presented her first collection in 1984 at Danceteria, with the help of her friend Joey Arias, who organized the events, and became an official participant in New York Fashion Week in 1985. Her work was soon being sold by Barneys New York, Colette in Paris, and Joyce Boutique in Hong Kong. Her work became influential in the world of design. According to the Israeli designer Alber Elbaz, "Everybody sort of stole from Isabel. Her work was about volume, cut, experiments, a laboratory of fabric — and that was not an Instagram moment. It was fashion."

In 1998, she stopped presenting biannual collections, instead choosing to create on her own schedule. Toledo was named creative director of Anne Klein in 2006 after more than twenty years of working solely under her own name, and this allowed her work to reach a wider public. Toledo made her debut with Anne Klein at New York Fashion Week in February 2007. Toledo and Anne Klein parted ways later in 2007.

== Awards ==
Isabel and her husband, Ruben Toledo, were the recipient of the 2005 Cooper-Hewitt National Design Award for their work in fashion.

Toledo was also the recipient of an Otis Critics' award named for her at the Los Angeles-based Otis College of Art and Design.

On September 3, 2008, Isabel Toledo was presented with the third annual Couture Council Award for Artistry of Fashion from the Museum at FIT in New York's Rainbow Room atop Rockefeller Center.

== Michelle Obama ==
Michelle Obama first wore a Toledo design in June 2008, for an appearance at a New York City fashion world fundraiser. She was introduced to Toledo's work through Ikram, a store in Chicago, Illinois, founded by Ikram Goldman. Toledo designed a lemongrass yellow, wool, and lace shift dress with matching overcoat, which the First Lady selected to wear at the first inauguration of Barack Obama, on January 20, 2009.

== Exhibitions ==
- "Isabel Toledo: Fashion from the Inside Out", The Museum at FIT, 2009
- "Isabel and Ruben Toledo: A Marriage of Art and Fashion", Kent State University Museum, 1999; traveled to other museums including the Ben Maltz Gallery at Otis College of Art and Design, 2002
- "Interpretation: 20th Century Clothing and Illustration", Ohio State University/Ohio Arts Council, 2000
- "Isabel and Ruben Toledo: A Marriage of Art and Fashion", Kent State University Museum, 2000
- "Spirals & Ellipses: Clothing the Body Three-Dimensionally", Kent State University Museum, 2005
