= Nick Powell (composer) =

British musician, composer and sound designer

Nick Powell is a British musician, composer and sound designer. He has worked extensively in theatre on productions in the West End and on Broadway, and for companies including the Royal National Theatre, the Royal Shakespeare Company, the National Theatre of Scotland, the Royal Court Theatre, and the Donmar Warehouse.

== Theatre career ==
In 1993, Powell founded the theatre company Suspect Culture alongside director Graham Eatough and playwright David Greig; composing music for fourteen of their productions.

In 2010, Powell co-wrote Get Santa! alongside writer/director Anthony Neilson; the play premiered at the Royal Court Theatre. Powell continued his collaboration with Nielson on Alice in Wonderland at the Royal Lyceum Theatre, Edinburgh and Unreachable at the Royal Court Theatre.

In the same year Powell won the Spanish Premios Max Award for Best Composition in Scenic Arts for his work with Andrés Lima and Animalario on the show Urtain.

Powell composed the music for the National Theatre's critically acclaimed production of Othello, directed by Nicholas Hytner. He was also the composer and sound designer for the Royal Shakespeare Company's production of Dunsinane, directed by Roxana Silbert.

Powell was sound designer of the Royal Shakespeare Company adaptations of Hilary Mantel’s Wolf Hall and Bring Up the Bodies; adapted by Mike Poulten and directed by Jeremy Herrin. The productions were part of the 2013–14 RSC season, followed by a West End run at the Aldwych Theatre. In 2015 The double-bill was re-titled Wolf Hall, Parts 1 and 2 for a Broadway run at the Winter Garden Theatre. Powell worked again with Jeremy Herrin on the UK premiere of The Nether by Jennifer Haley, a co-production between the Royal Court and Headlong. Following its run at the Royal Court in 2014, the production had a West End run at the Duke of York’s Theatre in 2015.

In 2015 Powell created the music for Lanark: A Life in Three Acts at the Edinburgh International Festival collaborating with, amongst others, Alex Lee, Nick McCarthy, Ted Milton, Sarah Willson, Chin Keeler and Lucy Wilkins.

In 2017, he composed the music for 59 Productions adaptation of City of Glass by Paul Auster, adapted for the stage by Duncan Macmillan and directed by Leo Warner at Home Manchester and the Lyric Hammersmith.

That same year Powell was the composer and sound designer on The Ferryman, written by Jez Butterworth and directed by Sam Mendes, it opened at the Royal Court Theatre, followed by a West End run at the Gielgud Theatre. The production transferred to Broadway the following year for which Powell was nominated for Best Sound Design of a Play at the Tony Awards and won a Drama Desk Award for Outstanding Sound Design.

In 2018, Powell composed the music for the National Theatre's production of The Lehman Trilogy, which went on to transfer to Broadway and the West End in 2019. Powell was nominated for Best Sound Designer at the Olivier Awards and for Outstanding Music in a Play at the Drama Desk Awards.

In 2023 Powell composed the music and designed the sound for The Hills of California. The production, directed by Sam Mendes, premiered at the Harold Pinter Theatre in the West End and shortly after transferred to Broadway. The production was well received, and Powell was nominated for Best Sound Design of a Play at the Tony Awards.

== Film and TV work ==
Powell has written extensively for the screen including the BAFTA winning documentary Death in Gaza. He was also the co-composer for the BBC series Lip Service and he scored the Spanish feature films Dispongo de Barcos and Gente En Sitios for writer/director Juan Cavestany. In addition, he has scored three of the films of visual artist Phil Collins, including co-writing music for Socialism Today with Lætitia Sadier. Powell also worked as Music Consultant on Sam Mendes' film 1917.

== Music career ==
Powell has toured and recorded with many bands including McAlmont & Butler, Strangelove and Astrid. He is one half of OSKAR, who have performed live scores for three PRADA fashion shows in Milan, exhibited installations at the V&A and the CCA Glasgow as well as producing two albums Air Conditioning and LP:2.

Walls Fall Down was Powell's first solo album release. The album featured numerous guest players including Alex Lee, Sarah Willson, Chin Keeler, Lucy Wilkins, Una Palliser, Rob Spriggs, and Calina De La Mar and was released in March 2021. The album track, "Out of Key", has music video featuring Powell’s daughter, and featured in Juan Cavestany's film 2020 Spanish film, shot during the COVID lockdown, Madrid, Int. 2021 also saw the release of Powell's soundtrack to Spanish feature film Un Efecto Óptico and his solo piano soundtrack to The Lehman Trilogy.

In 2022, Powell released ‘Music from the Black Box’. The album consisting of 17 tracks, predominantly instrumental, reimagining compositions throughout his career on stage and screen. The album features many previous collaborators of Powell’s including Alex Lee Lucy Wilkins, Sarah Willson and Charlotte Glasson.

Powell’s next release was in 2024, titled Atomised. The mini LP features collaborations with guitarist and composer Alex Lee and drummer Jason Cooper.

== Further Work ==
In 2016, Powell was commissioned by The City Of Birmingham Symphony Orchestra and Birmingham Repertory Theatre to create Cold Calling: The Arctic Project; in which a 20 piece orchestra joined actors performing against a backdrop of Arctic landscapes.

Powell scored ‘Creation’ a stop-motion gallery installation as part of an ongoing project with visual artist Jessica Albarn in 2016.

Powell composed the music for the 59 Production’s Bloom, a multimedia installation in Edinburgh’s St Andrew Square to mark the opening of the 70th Edinburgh International Festival. In October 2017 Powell joined Alex Lee in composing music for 59's Reflections; an animation projected in the Guggenhaim Museum, Bilbao.

In 2022, Powell composed original scores for the immersive art experience, ‘Frameless’. Powell’s music was featured in both The Colour in Motion and The Art of Abstraction galleries. He later released two companion albums titled ‘Frameless the Colour in Motion’ and ‘Frameless the Art of Abstraction’, after the success of the installation.

In 2025 Powell created the score for the multimedia experience ‘Our Story’, working alongside the award-winning production team at Open Planet Studios and David Attenborough. The experience, showing at the National History Museum in London, combines animations and projections and narration from Sir David Attenborough, telling the story of the human race and their planet.
