= Dan Moses Schreier =

American composer and sound designer

- Education: University of Michigan, Ann Arbor; Columbia University; New York University (BA); Juilliard School (GrDip)
- Musical career
- Genres: theatrical avant-garde
- Occupations: sound designer composer
- Years active: 1980–present
- Website: Official website

Dan Moses Schreier is an American composer and sound designer. He is best known for his theatrical music work, on Broadway and elsewhere.

Schreier is from Detroit, and lives in New York City. He studied music at the University of Michigan and at Columbia University.

== Awards ==
Dan Moses Schreier won Drama Desk Awards for Outstanding Sound Design for Floyd Collins (1996), Into the Woods (2002), Assassins (2004), and American Psycho (2016). He received Drama Desk Award nominations for Outstanding Sound Design for Spic-O-Rama (1993), God's Heart (1997), Sweeney Todd (2006), Passion (2013), A Gentleman's Guide to Love and Murder (2014), Act One (also 2014), Pacific Overtures (2018), and Floyd Collins (2025), and a nomination for Outstanding Music in a Play for The Merchant of Venice (2011).

Schreier was nominated for Tony Awards for Best Sound Design of a Musical for Gypsy (2008), A Little Night Music (2010), Sondheim on Sondheim (also 2010), and Floyd Collins (2025), and for Best Sound Design of a Play for Act One (2014) and The Iceman Cometh (2018).

In 1990 Schreier won an Obie Award for Sustained Excellence of Sound Design. In 2003 he won an L.A. Ovation Award for Sound Design in a Larger Theater for Gem of the Ocean.
