= List of awards and nominations received by Stephen Daldry =

Stephen Daldry awards and nominations
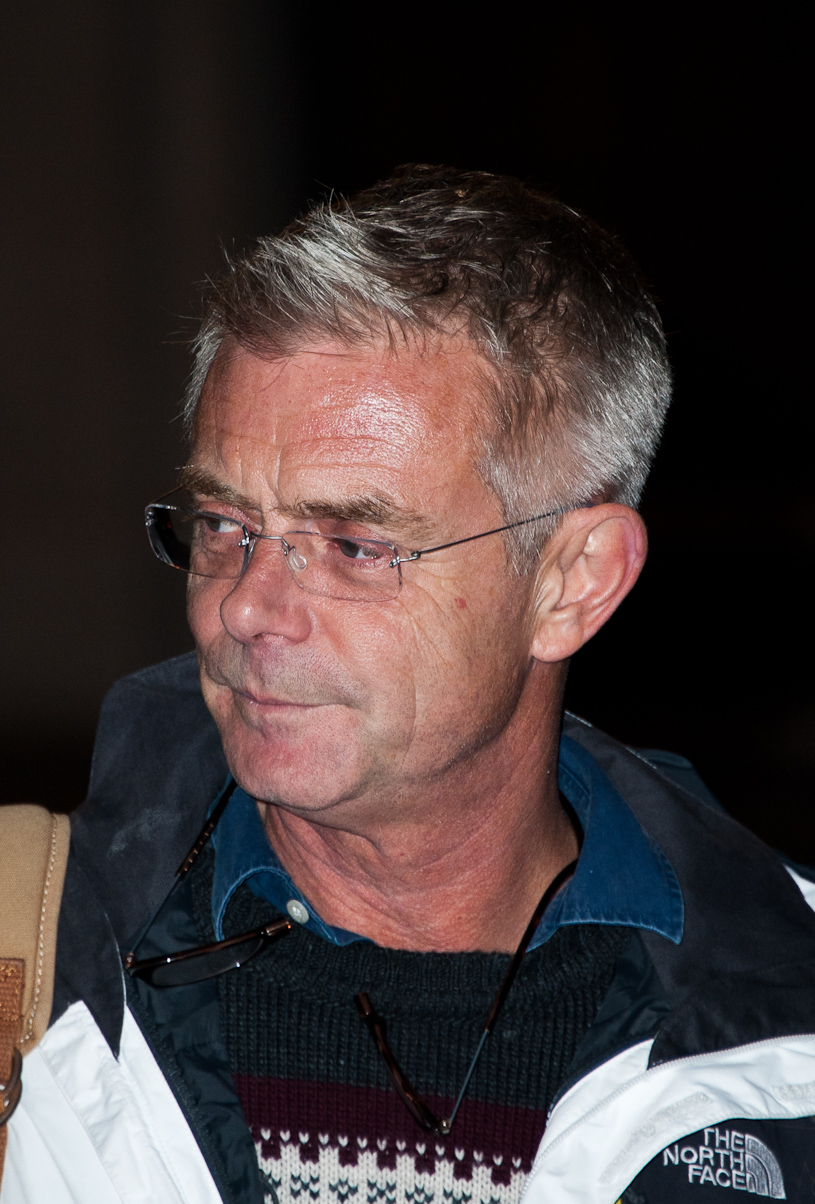
- Daldry in 2013
Awards and nominations
| Award | Wins | Nominations |
| Academy Awards | 0 | 3 |
| BAFTA Awards | 2 | 10 |
| Emmy Awards | 2 | 6 |
| Golden Globes | 0 | 2 |
| Olivier Awards | 1 | 3 |
| Tony Awards | 3 | 4 |

Totals (Note: Certain award groups do not simply award one winner. They acknowledge several different recipients, have runners-up, and have third place. Since this is a specific recognition and is different from losing an award, runner-up mentions are considered wins in this award tally. For simplification and to avoid errors, each award in this list has been presumed to have had a prior nomination.)
- Wins: 11
- Nominations: 68

Stephen Daldry is an English director of stage and screen. Over his career he has received numerous accolades including two BAFTA Awards, two Emmy Awards, three Tony Awards, and a Laurence Olivier Award as well as nominations for three Academy Awards, two Golden Globe Awards and a Critics' Choice Award. His films have competed at both the Berlin International Film Festival and the Cannes Film Festival.

Daldry directed the British short film Eight (1998) for which he received a nomination for the BAFTA Award for Best Short Film. He made his directorial debut with the coming-of-age film Billy Elliot (2000), for which he earned the BAFTA Award for Outstanding British Film as well as nominations for the Academy Award for Best Director. He then directed the psychological period drama The Hours (2002) for which he earned nominations for the Academy Award, the BAFTA Award, and the Golden Globe Award for Best Director. He also directed the romance drama The Reader (2008) earning nominations for the Academy Award, the BAFTA Award, and the Golden Globe Award for Best Director. He directed the drama Extremely Loud & Incredibly Close (2011) for which he was nominated for the Critics' Choice Movie Award for Best Director. He directed the crime drama thriller Trash (2014) earning a nomination for the BAFTA Award for Best Film Not in the English Language.

On television, he gained widespread recognition for producing and directing the Netflix period historical drama series The Crown which ran for six seasons about the life and legacy of Queen Elizabeth II portrayed by Claire Foy, Olivia Colman, and Imelda Staunton from 2016 to 2020. He won the Primetime Emmy Award for Outstanding Directing for a Drama Series for the episode, "Paterfamilias" in 2018. He then won the Primetime Emmy Award for Outstanding Drama Series for the fourth season of The Crown. For that same season, he won the Producers Guild of America Award for Best Episodic Drama in 2020. He also was nominated for the British Academy Television Craft Award for Best Director: Fiction. He won the British Academy Television Award for Best Single Drama for the romantic dramedy Together in 2022.

On stage, he started his career on the West End where he two Laurence Olivier Awards for Best Director for the Peter Morgan historical play The Audience (2013) and the Matthew López play The Inheritance (2019). He was previously Olivier-nominated for directing the musical Billy Elliot (2006). On Broadway, he won two Tony Awards for Best Direction of a Play for the J.B. Priestly revival An Inspector Calls (1994) and the Matthew Lopez play The Inheritance (2020). He won the Tony Award for Best Direction of a Musical for Billy Elliot (2009). He was also nominated for the Tony Award for Best Direction of a Play for the David Hare play Skylight (2015). He has also won three Drama Desk Awards and an Outer Critics Circle Award. Daldry won the Drama League Award's Founders Award for Excellence in Directing in 2025.

== Major associations ==
=== Academy Awards ===
| Year | Category | Nominated work | Result | Ref. |
|---|---|---|---|---|
| 2000 | Best Director | Billy Elliott | Nominated | |
| 2002 | Best Director | The Hours | Nominated | |
| 2008 | Best Director | The Reader | Nominated | |

=== BAFTA Awards ===
| Year | Category | Nominated work | Result | Ref. |
British Academy Film Awards
| 1998 | Best Short Film | Eight | Nominated | |
| 2000 | Outstanding British Film | Billy Elliot | Won | |
| 2000 | Best Direction | Billy Elliot | Nominated | |
| 2000 | Outstanding Debut by a British Writer, Director or Producer | Billy Elliot | Nominated | |
| 2002 | Outstanding British Film | The Hours | Nominated | |
| 2002 | Best Direction | The Hours | Nominated | |
| 2008 | Best Direction | The Reader | Nominated | |
| 2014 | Best Film Not in the English Language | Trash | Nominated | |
British Academy Television Awards
| 2017 | Best Direction: Fiction | The Crown | Nominated | |
| 2022 | Best Single Drama | Together | Won | |

=== Critics' Choice Awards ===
| Year | Category | Nominated work | Result | Ref. |
|---|---|---|---|---|
| 2011 | Best Director | Extremely Loud & Incredibly Close | Nominated | |

=== Emmy Awards ===
| Year | Category | Nominated work | Result | Ref. |
Primetime Emmy Awards
| 2017 | Outstanding Drama Series | The Crown (season one) | Nominated | |
| 2017 | Outstanding Directing in a Drama Series | The Crown (episode: "Hyde Park Corner") | Nominated | |
| 2018 | Outstanding Drama Series | The Crown (season two) | Nominated | |
| 2018 | Outstanding Directing in a Drama Series | The Crown (episode: "Paterfamilias") | Won | |
| 2020 | Outstanding Drama Series | The Crown (season three) | Nominated | |
| 2021 | Outstanding Drama Series | The Crown (season four) | Won | |
| 2023 | Outstanding Drama Series | The Crown (season five) | Nominated | |
| 2024 | Outstanding Drama Series | The Crown (season six) | Nominated | |
| 2024 | Outstanding Directing for a Drama Series | The Crown (episode: "Sleep, Dearie Sleep") | Nominated | |

=== Golden Globe Awards ===
| Year | Category | Nominated work | Result | Ref. |
|---|---|---|---|---|
| 2002 | Best Director | The Hours | Nominated | |
| 2008 | Best Director | The Reader | Nominated | |

=== Laurence Olivier Awards ===
| Year | Category | Nominated work | Result | Ref. |
|---|---|---|---|---|
| 2006 | Best Director | Billy Elliott | Nominated | |
| 2013 | Best Director | The Audience | Nominated | |
| 2019 | Best Director | The Inheritance | Won | |

=== Tony Awards ===
| Year | Category | Nominated work | Result | Ref. |
|---|---|---|---|---|
| 1994 | Best Direction of a Play | An Inspector Calls | Won | |
| 2009 | Best Direction of a Musical | Billy Elliott | Won | |
| 2015 | Best Direction of a Play | Skylight | Nominated | |
| 2020 | Best Direction of a Play | The Inheritance | Won | |

== Miscellaneous awards ==
| Organizations | Year | Category | Work | Result | Ref. |
|---|---|---|---|---|---|
| Berlin International Film Festival | 2002 | Golden Bear | The Hours | Nominated | |
| Berlin International Film Festival | 2002 | Reader Jury of the "Berliner Morgenpost" | The Hours | Won | |
| British Independent Film Award | 2000 | Best Director | Billy Elliot | Won | |
| Cannes Film Festival | 2000 | Caméra d'Or | Billy Elliot | Nominated | |
| César Awards | 2000 | Best Foreign Film | Billy Elliot | Nominated | |
| César Awards | 2002 | Best Foreign Film | The Hours | Nominated | |
| Directors Guild of America Awards | 2002 | Outstanding Directorial Achievement in Motion Pictures | The Hours | Nominated | |
| European Film Awards | 2008 | European Film | The Reader | Nominated | |
| Evening Standard British Film Awards | 2009 | Best European Film | The Reader | Won | |
| Goya Awards | 2000 | Best European Film | Billy Elliot | Nominated | |
| London Film Critics Circle | 2000 | Best Director of the Year | Billy Elliot | Won | |
| London Film Critics Circle | 2000 | Newcomer of the Year | Billy Elliot | Nominated | |
| London Film Critics Circle | 2002 | Best Director of the Year | The Hours | Nominated | |
| Palm Springs International Film Festival | 2002 | Director of the Year Award | Extremely Loud & Incredibly Close | Won | |
| Palm Springs International Film Festival | 2011 | Director of the Year | International Filmmaker Award | Honored | |
| Producers Guild of America Awards | 2018 | Outstanding Producer of Episodic Television - Drama | The Crown (season two) | Nominated | |
| Producers Guild of America Awards | 2020 | Outstanding Producer of Episodic Television - Drama | The Crown (season three) | Nominated | |
| Producers Guild of America Awards | 2021 | Outstanding Producer of Episodic Television - Drama | The Crown (season four) | Won | |
| Producers Guild of America Awards | 2024 | Outstanding Producer of Episodic Television - Drama | The Crown (season five) | Nominated | |

== Theater awards ==
| Organizations | Year | Category | Work | Result | Ref. |
|---|---|---|---|---|---|
| Drama Desk Awards | 1994 | Outstanding Direction of a Play | An Inspector Calls | Won | |
| Drama Desk Awards | 2009 | Outstanding Direction of a Musical | Billy Elliot The Musical | Won | |
| Drama Desk Awards | 2020 | Outstanding Direction of a Play | The Inheritance | Won | |
| Drama Desk Awards | 2025 | Outstanding Direction of a Play | Stranger Things: The First Shadow | Nominated | |
| Drama League Award | 2025 | Founders Award for Excellence in Directing | | Honored | |
| Outer Critics Circle Award | 2009 | Outstanding Direction of a Musical | Billy Elliot The Musical | Won | |
| Outer Critics Circle Award | 2015 | Outstanding Direction of a Play | The Audience | Nominated | |
| Outer Critics Circle Award | 2025 | Outstanding Direction of a Play | Stranger Things: The First Shadow | Nominated | |
