= John W. Davis =

American politician (1873–1955)

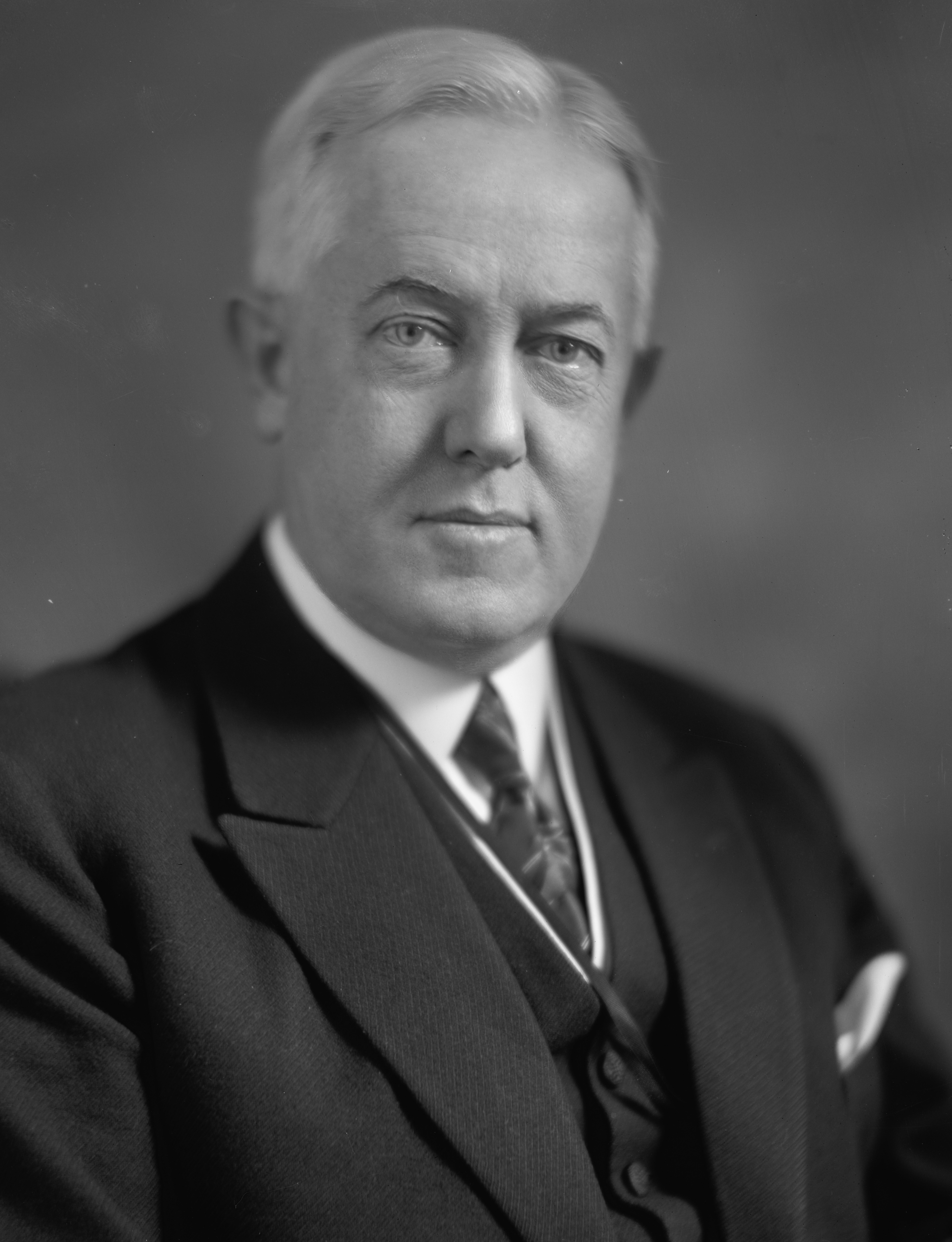
- Portrait by Harris & Ewing

37th United States Ambassador to the United Kingdom
- In office December 18, 1918 – March 9, 1921
- President: Woodrow Wilson; Warren G. Harding
- Preceded by: Walter Page
- Succeeded by: George Harvey

15th Solicitor General of the United States
- In office August 30, 1913 – November 26, 1918
- President: Woodrow Wilson
- Preceded by: William Bullitt
- Succeeded by: Alexander King

Member of the U.S. House of Representatives from West Virginia's 1st district
- In office March 4, 1911 – August 29, 1913
- Preceded by: William Hubbard
- Succeeded by: Matthew Neely

Personal details
- Born: John William Davis; April 13, 1873 Clarksburg, West Virginia, U.S.
- Died: March 24, 1955 (aged 81) Charleston, South Carolina, U.S.
- Resting place: Locust Valley Cemetery
- Party: Democratic
- Spouses: Julia McDonald (m. 1899; died 1900); Ellen Bassel (m. 1912; died 1943)
- Children: 1
- Relatives: Cyrus Vance (cousin, later adopted son)
- Education: Washington and Lee University (BA, LLB)

John William Davis (April 13, 1873 – March 24, 1955) was an American politician, diplomat, and lawyer. He served under President Woodrow Wilson as the Solicitor General of the United States and the United States Ambassador to the United Kingdom. He was the Democratic nominee for president in 1924, losing to Republican incumbent Calvin Coolidge.

Davis was born and raised in West Virginia, where his father, John James Davis, had been a delegate to the Wheeling Convention and served in the U.S. House of Representatives in the 1870s. Davis joined his father's legal practice and adopted many of his father's political views, including opposition to anti-lynching legislation and support for states' rights. Davis served in the U.S. House from 1911 to 1913, helping to write the Clayton Antitrust Act. He held the position of Solicitor General of the United States from 1913 to 1918, during which time he successfully argued for the unconstitutionality of the grandfather clause in Oklahoma's constitution, which had a discriminatory effect against African-American voters, in Guinn v. United States.

While serving as ambassador to Britain from 1918 to 1921, Davis was a dark horse candidate for the 1920 Democratic presidential nomination. After he left office, Davis helped establish the Council on Foreign Relations and advocated for the repeal of Prohibition. The 1924 Democratic National Convention nominated Davis for president after 103 ballots. He remains the only major party presidential nominee from West Virginia. Running on a ticket with Charles W. Bryan, Davis lost in a landslide to incumbent President Coolidge. Davis did not seek public office again after 1924. He continued as a prominent attorney, associated with several law firms over the years, and represented many of the largest companies in the United States from the 1920s onwards. Davis argued 140 cases before the U.S. Supreme Court.

In addition to his legal work, Davis was also involved in the New York City Bar Association, serving as its president from 1931 to 1933. In 1933, he represented J. P. Morgan Jr. and his companies during a Senate investigation into private banking and the causes of the Great Depression. During the last two decades of his career, Davis represented businesses before the Supreme Court, challenging the constitutionality and application of New Deal legislation. He lost many of these cases but scored a major victory for "Little Steel" in Youngstown Sheet & Tube Co. v. Sawyer (1952), in which the Supreme Court ruled against President Harry Truman's seizure of the steel mills. Davis unsuccessfully defended the "separate but equal" doctrine in Briggs v. Elliott (1952), one of the companion cases to the landmark school desegregation case Brown v. Board of Education (1954).

== Family and early life ==
=== Family background ===
Davis's paternal family had roots in western Virginia and what became West Virginia. His great-grandfather, Caleb Davis, was a clockmaker in the Shenandoah Valley. In 1816, his grandfather, John Davis, moved to Clarksburg in what would later become West Virginia. Its population then was 600–700, and he ran a saddle and harness business. His father, John James Davis, attended Lexington Law School, which later became the Washington and Lee University School of Law. By the age of twenty, John J. had established a law practice in Clarksburg. He was a delegate in the Virginia General Assembly, and after the northwestern portion of Virginia broke away from the rest of Virginia in 1863 and formed West Virginia, he was elected to the new state's House of Delegates and later to the United States House of Representatives.

John W. Davis's mother Anna Kennedy (1841–1917) was from Baltimore, Maryland, daughter of William Wilson Kennedy and his wife Catherine Esdale Martin. Kennedy was a lumber merchant. Catherine was the daughter of Tobias Martin, dairy farmer and amateur poet, and his wife, a member of the Esdale family. The Esdales were members of the Religious Society of Friends, or Quakers, who had settled near Valley Forge, Pennsylvania. Reportedly they helped provide support for the Continental Army under George Washington, which had camped there in the winter of 1777–1778.

=== Early years ===
Davis's Sunday school teacher recalled that he had "a noble face even when small". His biographer said that "[h]e used better English, kept himself cleaner, and was more dignified than most youngsters. He was also extraordinarily well-mannered."

=== Education ===
Davis's education began at home, as his mother taught him to read before he had memorized the alphabet. She had him read poetry and other literature from their home library. After turning ten, Davis was put in a class with older students to prepare him for the state teachers examination. A few years later, he was enrolled in a previously all-female seminary that doubled as a private boarding and day school. He never had grades under 94. Davis entered Washington and Lee University at the age of sixteen. He graduated in 1892 with a major in Latin. He joined the Phi Kappa Psi fraternity, participated in intramural sports, and attended mixed parties.

Davis would have started law school directly after graduation, but he lacked funds. Instead, he became a teacher for Major Edward H. McDonald of Charles Town, West Virginia. Davis taught McDonald's nine children and his six nieces and nephews. His student Julia, nineteen at the time, later became Davis's wife. Davis fulfilled a nine-month contract with McDonald. He returned to Clarksburg and apprenticed at his father's law practice. For fourteen months he copied documents by hand, read cases, and did much of what other aspiring lawyers did at the time to "read the law".

Davis graduated with a law degree from Washington and Lee University School of Law in 1895 and was elected Law Class Orator. His speech gave a glimpse of his advocacy skills:

[The] lawyer has been always the sentinel of the watchtower of liberty. In all times and all countries has he stood forth in defense of his nation, her laws and liberties, not, it may be, under a shower of leaden death, but often with the frown of a revengeful and angry tyrant bent upon him. Fellow classmates of 1895, shall we ... prove unworthy?

=== Early legal career ===
After graduation, Davis obtained the three signatures required to receive his law license (one from a local judge, and two from local attorneys, who attested to his proficiency in the law and upstanding moral character) and joined his father in practice in Clarksburg. They called their partnership Davis and Davis, Attorneys at Law. Davis lost his first three cases before his fortunes began to turn.

Before Davis had completed his first year of private practice, he was recruited to Washington & Lee Law School as an assistant professor, starting in the fall of 1896. At the time, the law school had a faculty of two, and Davis became the third. At the end of the year, Davis was asked to return but demurred. He decided that he needed the "rough & tumble" of private practice.

=== Family connections ===
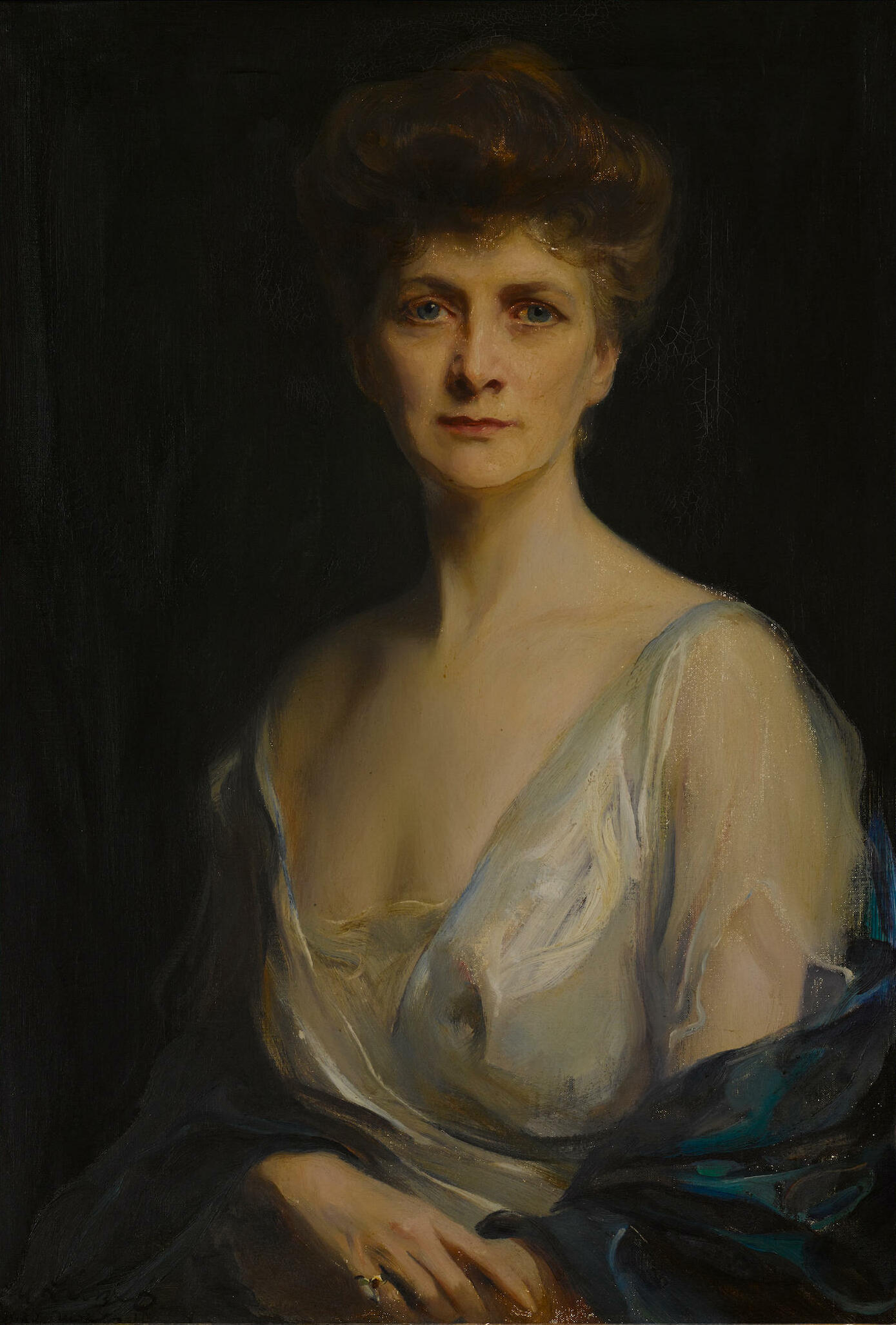
Ellen G. Bassel (Philip Alexius de Laszlo, 1920)

On June 20, 1899, he married Julia T. McDonald, who died on August 17, 1900. They had one daughter together, Julia McDonald Davis. She later married Charles P. Healy, and then William M. Adams. The widower Davis married again, on January 2, 1912, to Ellen G. Bassel. She died in 1943.

Davis was the cousin and adoptive father of Cyrus Vance, who later served as Secretary of State under Jimmy Carter. Vance, born in Clarksburg in 1917, lost his father in 1922 and was sent by his widowed mother to study in Switzerland. The much older and by then quite prominent Davis, referred to as an "uncle" within the family, mentored young Vance and adopted him.

Davis's daughter Julia was one of the first two female journalists hired by the Associated Press in 1926. (The other was probably Marguerite Young.) Julia married first Charles P. Healy and later William McMillan Adams, president of Sprague International, the export subsidiary of Sprague Electric. He was the son of Arthur Henry Adams, president of the United States Rubber Company. Both father and son were aboard the luxury liner RMS Lusitania when it was sunk by a German submarine in 1915. Arthur Adams died; his son survived.

Julia and William divorced, and both remarried. She divorced again, and later they remarried in their old age. Adams had two sons by his second wife, John Perry and Arthur Henry Adams II. Julia died in 1993 with no natural children but claimed six "by theft and circumstance."

== Political and diplomatic career ==
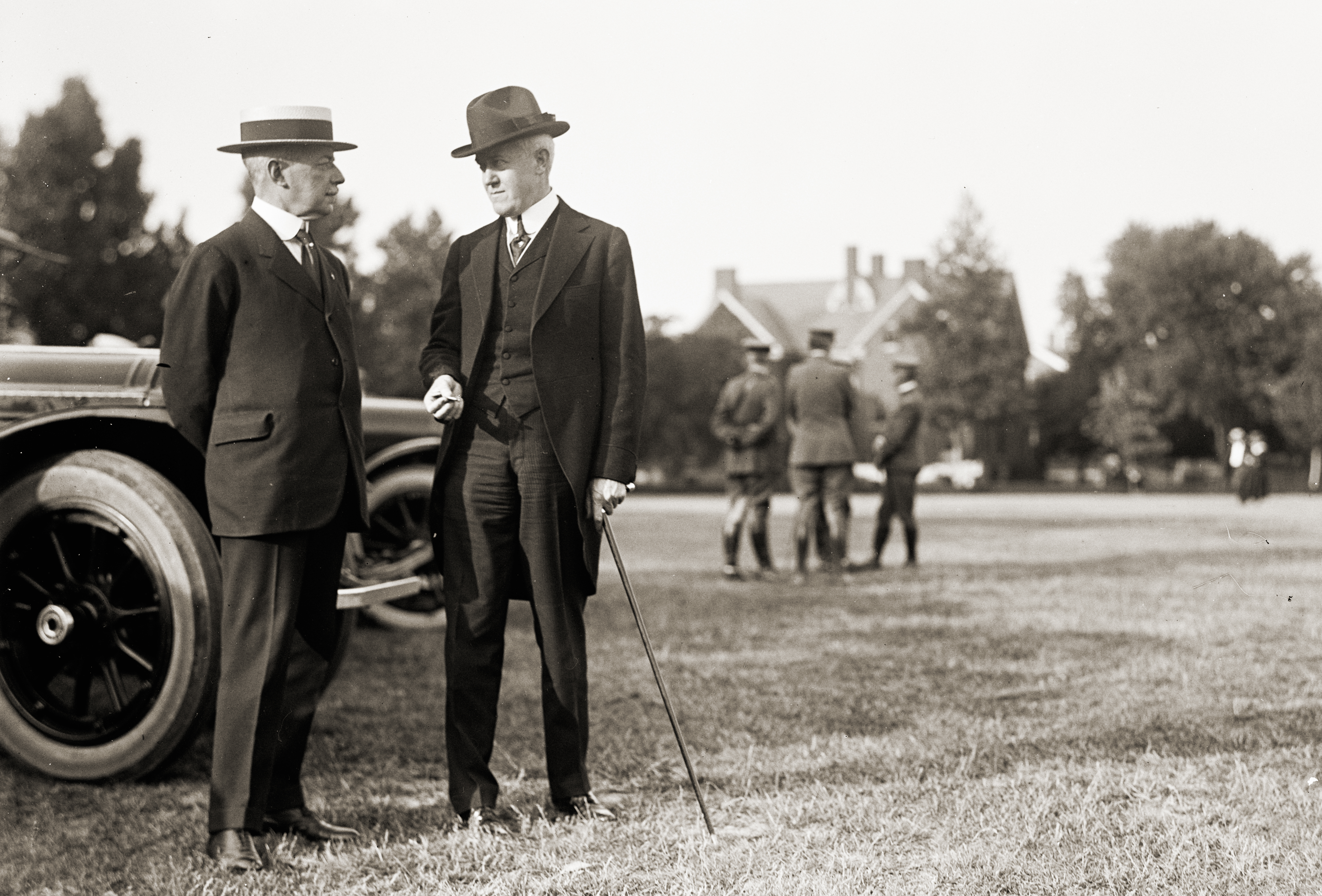
Davis (right) and Secretary of State Robert Lansing in 1917

=== Early career ===
Davis's father had been a delegate to the Wheeling Convention, which had created the state of West Virginia, but he had also opposed the abolitionists and Radical Republicans, and opposed ratification of the Fifteenth Amendment. Davis acquired much of his father's southern Democratic politics, opposing women's suffrage, Federal child-labor laws and anti-lynching legislation, and Harry S. Truman's civil rights program. He defended states' rights to establish the poll tax by questioning whether uneducated non-taxpayers should be allowed to vote. Davis was as much opposed to centralism in politics as he was to the concentration of capital by large corporations, supporting a number of early progressive laws regulating interstate commerce and limiting the power of corporations. Consequently, he felt distinctly out of place in the Republican Party, which supported free association and free markets, and maintained his father's staunch allegiance to the Democratic Party, even as he later represented the interests of business opposed to the New Deal. Davis ranked as one of the last Jeffersonians, as he supported states' rights and opposed a strong executive (he would be the lead attorney against Truman's nationalization of the steel industry).

In 1898, Davis was elected to the West Virginia House of Delegates, ending a 20-year Republican hold on the seat. Even though Davis had argued in behalf of some railroad companies during his legal career, he was elected by denouncing them, as his opponent had made enemies by supporting railroad interests. He was touted for speaker, but ended up becoming the Democratic floor leader. He became well known in the legislature, as few, if any, in the body could match his legal abilities.

After his one term in the legislature, Davis became the Harrison County party chairman for 12 years. He was also a delegate to the 1904 Democratic National Convention and voted for the more conservative candidate, Alton B. Parker. The populism of William Jennings Bryan never appealed to him, and he was pleased to see the Democrats moving in Parker's direction.

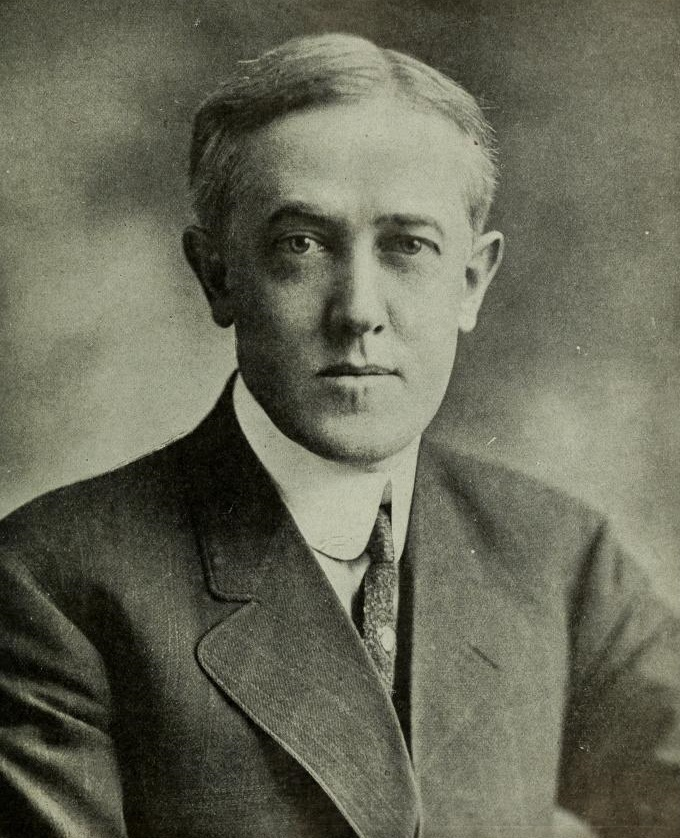
Davis during the period in which he served in Congress

He represented West Virginia in the U.S. House of Representatives from 1911 to 1913, where he was one of the authors of the Clayton Antitrust Act. Davis also served as one of the impeachment managers in the successful impeachment trial of Judge Robert W. Archbald. He served as U.S. Solicitor General from 1913 to 1918. As Solicitor General, he successfully argued in Guinn v. United States for the unconstitutionality of the grandfather clause in Oklahoma's constitution. It exempted residents descended from a voter registered in 1866 (i.e. whites) from a literacy test that effectively disenfranchised blacks. Davis's personal posture differed from his position as an advocate. Throughout his career, he could separate his personal views and professional advocacy.

Davis served as President Wilson's ambassador to Great Britain from 1918 to 1921. He reflected deep Southern support for Wilsonianism, based on a reborn Southern patriotism, a distrust of the Republican Party, and a resurgence of Anglophilism. Davis proselytized in London for the League of Nations based on his paternalistic belief that peace depended primarily on Anglo-American friendship and leadership. He was disappointed by Wilson's mismanagement of the treaty ratification and by Republican isolationism and distrust of the League. In his diaries Davis kept records of various developments in British politics at that time, such as social reform proposals and enactments such as unemployment insurance, profit-sharing, a minimum wage law, and an eight-hour law. Davis's diary also noted how prime minister David Lloyd George stated "that not only was his programme liberal but so liberal that his programme shocked an American Democrat."

Davis was elected a member of the American Philosophical Society in 1924.

=== Presidential candidate ===
Davis was a dark horse candidate for the Democratic nomination for president in both 1920 and 1924. His friend and partner Frank Polk managed his campaign at the 1924 Democratic National Convention. He won the nomination in 1924 as a compromise candidate on the 103rd ballot, after intense infighting between supporters of candidates former Secretary of Treasury William Gibbs McAdoo and New York Governor Al Smith, Davis was selected to appease both sides. Although Tennessee's Andrew Johnson served as president after Lincoln was assassinated, Davis's nomination made him the first presidential candidate from a former slave state since the Civil War, and as of 2026 he remains the only ever nominee from West Virginia. Davis's denunciation of the Ku Klux Klan and prior defense of black voting rights as Solicitor General cost him votes among conservative Southern Democrats, while gaining on Cox's vote in usual Democratic strongholds like New York City. Davis's staid personality ill-suited him for the demands of campaigning in an age of machine politics, as shown by Claude G. Bowers' description of a meeting arranged for Davis with a delegation of Irish Catholics from New York:

Davis went down the line shaking hands cordially but with the dignity with which he would have passed down the line at a diplomatic reception. It was a fine cordiality, but not the kind these men understood. He should have punched them playfully in the chest or slapped them vigorously on the shoulder. Then he turned and looked at the visitors, apparently a little shy and uncertain what was expected of him.

Finally the vice-chairman spoke. "These men are here to help elect you," he said, almost accusingly.

Davis smiled and said, "Strength to their arms. We want every man in the boat and every man with an oar."

There was another embarrassing pause, and the vice-chairman surprised me with an impatient outburst. "Tell them you are an organization man!" he roared.

Davis admitted he was an organization man, looking a bit annoyed by the way he was being put through his paces, and then turned quickly to Mike Hennessy of the Boston Globe and engaged him in conversation. Clearly Davis did not qualify as a backslapping, baby-kissing politician.

He lost in a landslide to Calvin Coolidge, who did not leave the White House to campaign. Davis's 28.8 percent remains the smallest percentage of the popular vote ever won by a Democratic presidential nominee. Nonetheless, he won every state of the former Confederacy, plus Oklahoma.

=== Later political involvement ===
Davis was a member of the National Advisory Council of the Crusaders, an influential organization that promoted the repeal of Prohibition. He was the founding president of the Council on Foreign Relations, formed in 1921, chairman of the Carnegie Endowment for International Peace, and a trustee of the Rockefeller Foundation from 1922 to 1939. Davis also served as a delegate from New York to the 1928 and 1932 Democratic National Conventions.

In the 1932 presidential election Davis campaigned in behalf of Franklin D. Roosevelt, but never developed a close relationship with him. After Roosevelt took office, Davis quickly turned against the New Deal and joined with Al Smith and other anti-New Deal Democrats in forming the American Liberty League. He supported the Republican presidential candidate in the 1936, 1940, and 1944 elections. Davis was opposed to interventionist measures introduced during the Roosevelt years like old-age pensions, believing that people should be given the chance to provide for their families and their old age through accumulating savings.

Davis was implicated by retired Marine Corps Major General Smedley Butler in the Business Plot, an alleged political conspiracy in 1933 to overthrow Roosevelt, in testimony before the McCormack-Dickstein Committee, whose deliberations began on November 20, 1934, and culminated in the committee's report to the U.S. House of Representatives on February 15, 1935. Davis was not called to testify because "The committee will not take cognizance of names brought into the testimony which constitute mere hearsay."

In 1949 Davis, as a member of the board of the Carnegie Endowment for International Peace, testified as a character witness for Alger Hiss (Carnegie's president) during his trials (part of the Hiss-Chambers Case): "In the twilight of his career, following the end of World War II, Davis publicly supported Alger Hiss and J. Robert Oppenheimer during the hysteria of the McCarthy hearings" (more accurately, the "McCarthy Era" as the Hiss Case (1948–1950) preceded McCarthyism in the 1950s).

== Legal career ==
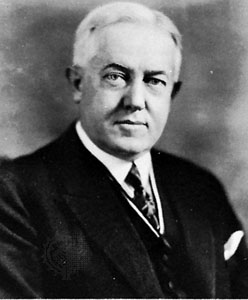
Davis in his later years

Davis was one of the most prominent and successful lawyers of the first half of the 20th century, arguing 140 cases before the U.S. Supreme Court. His firm, variously titled Stetson Jennings Russell & Davis, then Davis Polk Wardwell Gardiner & Reed, then Davis Polk Wardwell Sunderland & Kiendl (now Davis Polk & Wardwell), represented many of the largest companies in the United States in the 1920s and following decades. From 1931 to 1933, Davis also served as president of the New York City Bar Association.

In 1933, Davis served as legal counsel for the financier J.P. Morgan, Jr. and his companies during the Senate investigation into private banking and the causes of the recent Great Depression.

The last twenty years of Davis's practice included representing large corporations before the Supreme Court challenging the constitutionality and application of New Deal legislation. Davis lost many of these battles.

=== Appearances before the U.S. Supreme Court ===
Of the 140 cases Davis argued before the Supreme Court, 73 were as Solicitor General, and 67 as a private lawyer. Lawrence Wallace, who retired from the Office of the Solicitor General in 2003, argued 157 cases during his career but many believe that few attorneys have argued more cases than Davis. Daniel Webster and Walter Jones are believed to have argued more cases than Davis, but they were lawyers of a much earlier era.

=== Youngstown Steel case ===
One of Davis's most influential arguments before the Supreme Court was in Youngstown Sheet & Tube Co. v. Sawyer in May 1952, when the Court ruled on President Truman's seizure of the nation's steel plants.

While Davis wasn't brought into the case until March 1952, he was already familiar with the concept of a presidential seizure of a steel mill. In 1949, the Republic Steel Company, fearful of advice given to Truman by Attorney General Tom C. Clark, asked Davis for an opinion letter on whether the President could seize private industry in a "National Emergency." Davis wrote that the President could not do so, unless such power already was vested in the President by law. He further went on to opine on the Selective Service Act of 1948's intent, and that seizures were only authorized if a company did not sufficiently prioritize government production in a time of crisis.

Arguing for the steel industry, Davis spoke for 87 minutes before the Court. He described Truman's acts as a "'usurpation' of power, that were 'without parallel in American history.'" The justices allowed him to proceed uninterrupted, with only one question from Justice Felix Frankfurter, who may have had a personal feeling against Davis relating to his 1924 presidential campaign. It had been predicted that the President's actions would be upheld, and the injunction would be lifted, but the Court decided 6–3 to uphold the injunction stopping the seizure of the steel mills.

Washington Post writer Chalmers Roberts subsequently wrote that rarely "has a courtroom sat in such silent admiration for a lawyer at the bar" in reference to Davis's oral argument. Unfortunately, Davis did not allow the oral argument to be printed because the stenographic transcript was so garbled he feared it would not be close to what was said at the Court.

Of particular note in this case is that one of the justices in the majority was Tom Clark, who as attorney general in 1949 had advised Truman to proceed with the seizure of Republic Steel. Yet, in 1952, Justice Clark voted with the majority without joining Justice Hugo Black's opinion, in direct opposition to his previous advice.

=== Brown v. Board of Education ===
Davis's legal career is most remembered for his final appearance before the Supreme Court, in which he unsuccessfully defended the "separate but equal" doctrine in Briggs v. Elliott, a companion case to Brown v. Board of Education. Davis, as a defender of racial segregation and state control of education, uncharacteristically displayed his emotions in arguing that South Carolina had shown good faith in attempting to eliminate any inequality between black and white schools and should be allowed to continue to do so without judicial intervention. He expected himself to win "five to four, or maybe six to three", even after the matter was re-argued after the death of Chief Justice Fred M. Vinson. After Vinson's death, Davis himself was briefly considered by President Dwight D. Eisenhower as the nominee to replace the Chief Justice, though the position ultimately went to California Governor Earl Warren due to Davis's age. After the arguments, President Eisenhower invited Davis to a White House dinner with Chief Justice Warren as a way to signal his support of Davis's side of the case. After the Supreme Court, in an opinion written by Chief Justice Warren, unanimously ruled against his client's position, Davis returned the $25,000 (equivalent to $300,000 in 2025), that he had received from South Carolina, although he was not required to do so, but kept a silver tea service that had been presented to him. It has also been reported that he never charged South Carolina in the first place. He declined to participate further in the case, as he did not wish to be involved in the drafting of decrees to implement the Court's decision.

== Racial views ==
When arguing against the constitutionality of the Oklahoma grandfather clause in Guinn v. United States Davis "cordially accepted an amicus curiae brief, grounded in part on the Fourteenth amendment, for the National Association for the Advancement of Colored People" although he based his argument against the clause on the Fifteenth Amendment to the United States Constitution. Davis "privately question the wisdom of Negro suffrage" and his wife joked "that he was in danger of winning" but he did not believe "that the Fifteenth Amendment should be disregarded because the South had been coerced into ratifying it." Davis's victory marked the first time that "the United States Supreme Court ruled a state law unconstitutional" because it violated the Fifteenth Amendment.

In the 1924 United States presidential election Davis had at first not been sure if he should or should not condemn the Ku Klux Klan but ultimately had no choice but to give his opinion as other candidates gave their opinions on the Klan. On the night before he condemned them the Kleagle gave him a letter "offering to deliver the solid South in return for silence." "Is that all?" is what Davis asked him in response to the letter. When the man replied with "Yes" "Davis then tore up the letter" and said, "You may say there is no answer." The next day Davis condemned the Klan with him saying that "If any organization, no matter what it chooses to be called, whether it be KKK or any other name, raises the standard of racial and religious prejudices, or attempts to make racial origins or religious beliefs the test of fitness of public office, it does violence to the spirit of American institutions and must be condemned by all those who believe as I do in American ideals."

After this Davis was the only candidate in the race who consistently attacked the Klan, and he won the support of many black voters in Indiana and New York where he "came out for equal rights" with him emphasizing his record as Solicitor General in Harlem. African Americans "received him with special warmth in Missouri, where the Klan was strong and pressure to remain silent heavy. They gave him a three-foot high silver loving cup" with an inscription that stated, "A TOKEN OF APPRECIATION PRESENTED TO THE HON. JOHN W. DAVIS BY A GRATEFUL PEOPLE. . . FOR HIS MATCHLESS EFFORTS IN FIGHTING THE CAUSE OF HUMAN RIGHTS of the NEGROES OF WEST VIRGINA and the NATION."

The KKK's Imperial Wizard focused on condemning Robert M. La Follette and said in the middle of the campaign that KKK members could "vote for either Coolidge or Davis." The Nation wrote that Davis spoke "brave and welcome words about race prejudice" but questioned how far he would take it:

Mr. Davis waxes eloquent as to the Constitution. . . . But, like everybody else, Mr. Davis knows the sacred document to be violated constantly in the disenfranchisement of millions of Americans because of the color of their skin. Will he have us understand that if elected he will right that wrong, that he will help cut down the Southern representation in Congress as the Constitution specifies shall be done?

Davis believed that black people were "inherently inferior to whites" and "was both tolerant of and paternalistic toward individual blacks." Davis had been sympathetic to a black lawyer who had tried but been unable to start a law practice in Clarksburg, West Virginia and was friendly with African American "doormen, waiters, charwomen, and Supreme Court attendants." "I am busier than a nigger at election" was the derogatory language that he most commonly used. He supported "a fund drive for Fisk University" in the 1930s and believed that graduate schools should be integrated. In the 20s and 30s many black leaders were hopeful that Davis would support equal rights. One black leader wrote "You do not perhaps know, Mr. Davis, the gratitude and appreciation in which you are held by millions of colored people" and "The only distinct advance made in the establishment of their constitutional rights and civil liberties within the last two decades were made by you during your term as Solicitor General. . . . They have not forgotten also, the fine, courageous stand you took in 1924 against the Ku Klux Klan and upon other issues dear to their hearts." Davis was offered a place on the NAACP legal committee and board of directors by Walter White (activist) who he "received graciously" but he declined both positions. He also declined to participate in the defense in the Scottsboro Boys case although he called himself "sympathetic." In 1935, he declined to support an anti-lynching bill and in 1948 opposed President Harry Truman supporting civil rights. Ultimately, "his heart was really with the white social order. Despite his frequent references in the campaign of 1924 to his arguments in the Oklahoma grandfather clause cases of 1915, he privately defended polls taxes, never criticized the exclusion of blacks from Democratic primaries and never commented, privately or publicly, on the nation's dual system of justice."

Upon finding out that Davis was participating in Briggs v. Elliott the wife of Joseph Proskauer was shocked and wrote to Davis:

Perhaps you do not realize what you are going to do in favor of segregation. It is not only that you are such a good lawyer that you will undoubtedly win the case, but the mere fact that you are defending segregation in the South will make many people, now on the fence, say "If John Davis defends South Carolina in this suit perhaps there is something to be said for the case of segregation!"

She concluded by writing, "Please tell me, . . . how you, a believer in democracy, can defend such a cause."

== Death and legacy ==
Davis was a member of the American Bar Association, the Council on Foreign Relations, the Freemasons, Phi Beta Kappa, and Phi Kappa Psi. He was a resident of Nassau County, New York, and practiced law in New York City until his death in Charleston, South Carolina, at the age of 81. He is interred at Locust Valley Cemetery in Locust Valley, New York.

Upon his death, Supreme Court Justice Stanley F. Reed, who was the last holdout in the unanimous Brown decision, said of Davis "his appearances in this Court were in the best tradition of the American Bar". The John W. Davis Federal Building on West Pike Street in Clarksburg, West Virginia, is named for him. The building housing the Student Health Center at Washington and Lee University is named for him, as is the Law School's appellate advocacy program, and an award for the graduating student with the highest grade point average.

In the 1991 television film Separate But Equal, a dramatization of the Brown case, Davis was portrayed by the famed actor Burt Lancaster in his final film role.

== Electoral history ==
West Virginia's 1st congressional district, 1910:

- John W. Davis (D) – 20,370 (48.9%)
- Charles E. Carrigan (R) – 16,962 (40.7%)
- A.L. Bauer (Socialist) – 3,239 (7.8%)
- Ulysses A. Clayton (Prohibition) – 1,099 (2.6%)

West Virginia's 1st congressional district, 1912:

- John W. Davis (D) (inc.) – 24,777 (45.0%)
- George A. Laughlin (R) – 24,613 (44.7%)
- D.M.S. Scott (Socialist) – 4,230 (7.7%)
- L.E. Peters (Prohibition) – 1,482 (2.7%)

1924 Democratic presidential primaries

- William McAdoo – 562,601 (56.1%)
- Oscar W. Underwood – 77,583 (7.7%)
- James M. Cox – 74,183 (7.4%)
- Unpledged – 59,217 (5.9%)
- Henry Ford – 49,737 (5.0%)
- Thomas J. Walsh – 43,108 (4.3%)
- Woodbridge N. Ferris – 42,028 (4.2%)
- George Silzer – 35,601 (3.6%)
- Al Smith – 16,459 (1.6%)
- L.B. Musgrove – 12,110 (1.2%)
- William Dever – 1,574 (0.2%)
- James A. Reed – 84 (0.0%)
- John W. Davis – 21 (0.0%)

1924 United States presidential election

- Calvin Coolidge/Charles G. Dawes (R) – 15,723,789 (54.0%) and 382 electoral votes (35 states carried)
- John W. Davis/Charles W. Bryan (D) – 8,386,242 (28.8%) and 136 electoral votes (12 states carried)
- Robert M. La Follette, Sr./Burton K. Wheeler (Progressive) – 4,831,706 (16.6%) and 13 electoral votes (1 state carried)

== See also ==
- Brown v. Board of Education
- Guinn v. United States
- Youngstown Sheet & Tube Co. v. Sawyer

U.S. House of Representatives
Preceded by William Hubbard	Member of the U.S. House of Representatives from West Virginia's 1st congressional district 1911–1913	Succeeded by Matthew Neely
Legal offices
Preceded by William Bullitt	United States Solicitor General; 1913–1918	Succeeded by Alexander King
Diplomatic posts
Preceded by Walter Page	United States Ambassador to the United Kingdom; 1918–1921	Succeeded by George Harvey
Party political offices
Preceded by James Cox	Democratic nominee for President of the United States; 1924	Succeeded by Al Smith
