= Kissing hands =

Constitutional term for the formal installation of British government ministers

"To kiss hands" is a constitutional term used in the United Kingdom to refer to the formal installation of the prime minister or other Crown-appointed government ministers to their office.

== Overview ==
In the past, the term referred to the requirement that the office-holder actually kiss the hands of the monarch as a symbol of personal fealty and loyalty, that fealty and loyalty being a requirement to serve in the King's or Queen's government.

The term continues in use as a metaphor; in modern times, office-holders are not expected to physically kiss the hands of the monarch before assuming the role, neither at this ceremony nor at any other point in the process of installing a new office-holder. Simply being received by the monarch is taken to validate the selection, with this meeting being described in the Court Circular as "kissing hands". The invitation issued to a party leader to form a government is sometimes still described as "an invitation to kiss hands". The metaphorical kissing of hands (i.e., the appointment) does not legally take place until the subsequent meeting of the Privy Council, when the new minister is formally appointed as a member of the Council.

When appointing a Secretary of State (the top rank in the UK government), the protocol also involves the delivery by the King or Queen of the seals of office into the hands of the appointee. This is also valid for other officers who are keepers of seals, such as the Lord Privy Seal or the Lord Chancellor, who is also keeper of the Great Seal of the United Kingdom.

== History ==
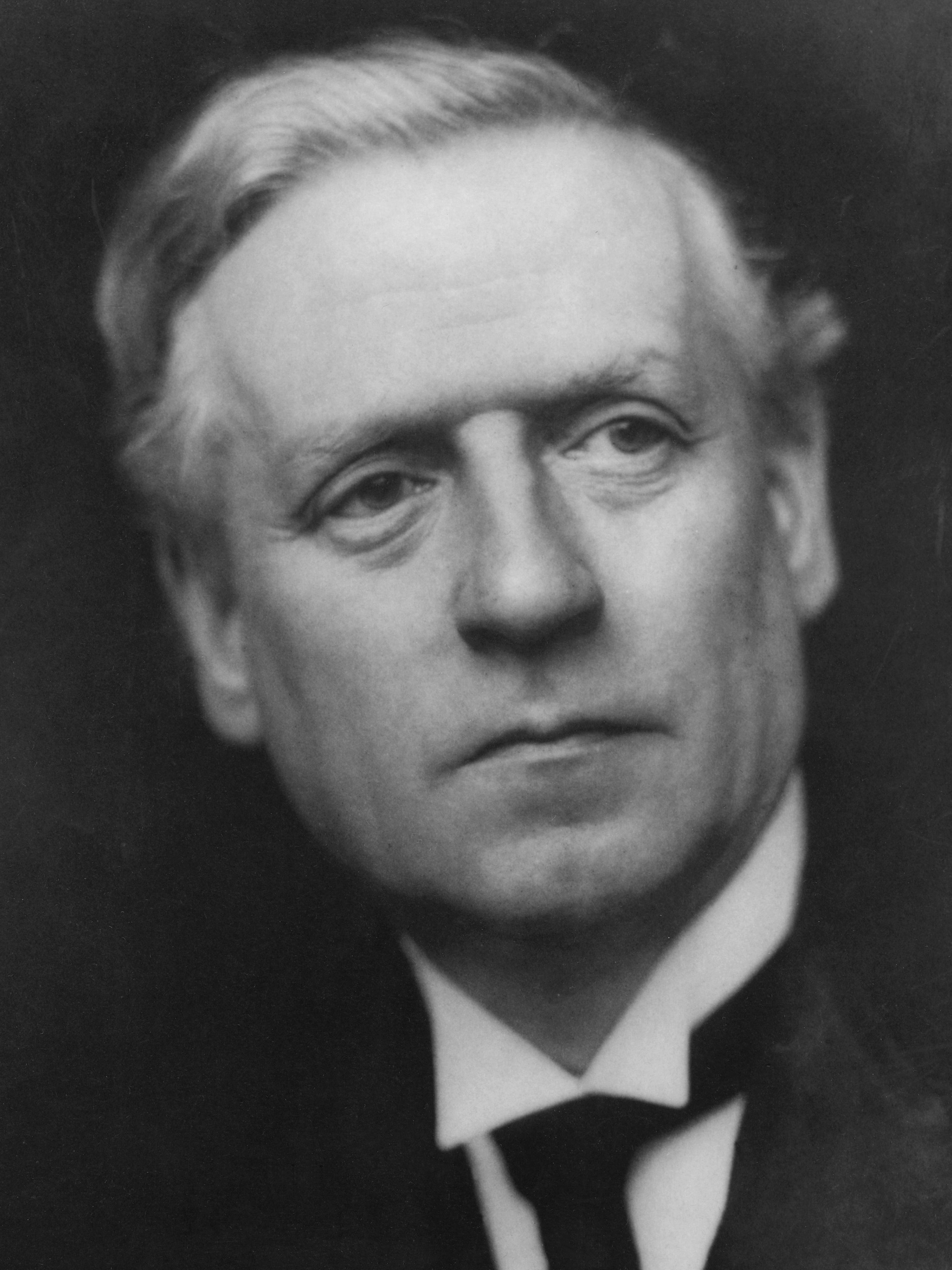
H. H. Asquith, seen here in 1908, was called out of the country to kiss hands with King Edward VII.

The ceremony usually takes place in Buckingham Palace, in the Audience Room, but it has been known to happen in Windsor Castle or Balmoral Castle. More unusually, in April 1908, Edward VII summoned H. H. Asquith out of the country to the Hôtel du Palais, Biarritz, France, where the King was on holiday at the time.

In his autobiography, Tony Blair recalled being confused by the fact that the ceremony did not involve literally kissing Queen Elizabeth II's hands, being told instead to "brush them [the hands] gently with your lips". When he was ushered into the room to meet the Queen, Blair tripped on a piece of carpet and fell onto the Queen's hands.

Due to the failing health of Elizabeth II, the 2022 kissing hands ceremony of Liz Truss took place at Balmoral, where the ailing Queen was spending her final days, marking the only time in her 70-year reign that the ceremony did not take place at Buckingham Palace. It was the Queen's last official act before her death two days later. This was the first time the ceremony had taken place at Balmoral since 1885, when Lord Salisbury began his first period as Prime Minister.

== See also ==
- Audience (meeting) § United Kingdom – Formal meeting between a head of state and another person
- Constitution of the United Kingdom – Uncodified national constitution
- "Kissing the ring" – Form of respectful gesture
- "Shaking hands and kissing babies" – Political campaigning practice
