= Andy Mulligan (author) =

English writer

- Born: 20 March 1966 (age 60) London, England
- Occupation: Author

Andy Mulligan is a British writer best known for young adult fiction. Raised in South London, he worked as a theatre director for ten years before retraining as a teacher. His teaching career took him to India, Brazil, Vietnam, the Philippines, and the UK, experiences that have strongly influenced his writing. He has been married to Anne Robinson since their elopement in 2015. He now divides his time between London and Manila.

== Career ==
Mulligan's first novel, Ribblestrop, was published by Simon & Schuster in 2009. The story originated "on a walk with a fellow teacher"; they talked about they might turn a particular "ramshackle stately home ... into a thoroughly inappropriate school".

His second novel, Trash, is set in the garbage dump of a large unnamed third world city reminiscent of Manila, and features a street child who lives as a waste picker. It was shortlisted for one of the annual Blue Peter Book Awards, but dropped "because it contains scenes of violence and swearing that are not suitable for the younger end of" the Blue Peter audience. David Fickling, the publisher of Trash, stated that "poor children live a very unpleasant life and to avoid that would be untruthful, and I don't think one should be untruthful to children. You can't make life wonderfully safe and middle-class all over the world." Trash was later shortlisted for the 2012 CILIP Carnegie Medal. (Note: As a late 2010 publication, Trash was eligible for the 2010 Blue Peter Awards and the 2012 Carnegie Medal. The Carnegie judges, who are children's librarians, recommended it for ages 12+. The suggested age ranges provided by the Medal judges over more than a decade have ranged from 8+ to 14+.) A film adaptation of Trash directed by Stephen Daldry was released in 2014.

Return to Ribblestrop (2011) was the first of two Ribblestrop sequels. Mulligan won the 2011 Guardian Children's Fiction Prize, a once-in-a-lifetime book award judged by a panel of British children's writers. "It is so fresh: the judges loved its anarchy, its good humour, its warm heart and the way it depicted children," according to committee chair Julia Eccleshare, children's book editor

== Works ==
- Ribblestrop (Simon & Schuster Children's Books, 2009)
- Trash (David Fickling Books, 2010)
- Return to Ribblestrop (Simon & Schuster, 2011)
- Ribblestrop Forever! (Simon & Schuster, 2012)
- The Boy With Two Heads (RHCP Digital, 2013)
- Liquidator (David Fickling Books, 2015)
- Rollercoaster (Adventure Book Box, 2016)
- Dog (Pushkin Children's Books, 2017

== Awards ==
- 2011 Guardian Children's Fiction Prize for Return to Ribblestrop
- Ribblestrop was shortlisted for a Roald Dahl Funny Prize in 2009.
- Trash was shortlisted for the CILIP Carnegie Medal in 2012.
