= Audience room of Buckingham Palace =

Room in Buckingham Palace

The audience room of Buckingham Palace is a room in Buckingham Palace where the British monarch meets heads of states and politicians. It is located within the private apartments on the north west side of the palace.

Elizabeth II met her Prime Ministers of the United Kingdom in the Audience Room, kissing hands with them upon their appointments and receiving their subsequent resignations.

The room was where Elizabeth met James Bond in the Happy and Glorious section of the 2012 Summer Olympics opening ceremony. The 2013 play about Elizabeth's meeting with her British prime ministers, The Audience, is set in the Private Audience Room.

Two paintings by Canaletto and two portraits by Thomas Gainsborough hang in the room and it is decorated in pale blue. Two chairs by François Herve upholstered in yellow silk from 1826 stand in the centre of the room. The chairs were previously upholstered in burgundy before Queen Mary desired they be clad in a more 'cheerful' colour. The room was heated by a two bar electric fire in 2013 and cooled by a Dyson fan in 2019. The room was decorated by John Fowler of Colefax and Fowler.

The official portrait to mark Elizabeth's record as the longest reigning British monarch was taken in the audience room by Mary McCartney in 2019. McCartney's portrait depicts Elizabeth working through her red boxes of official papers.
