= Stephen Daldry =

British director

Stephen Daldry CBE
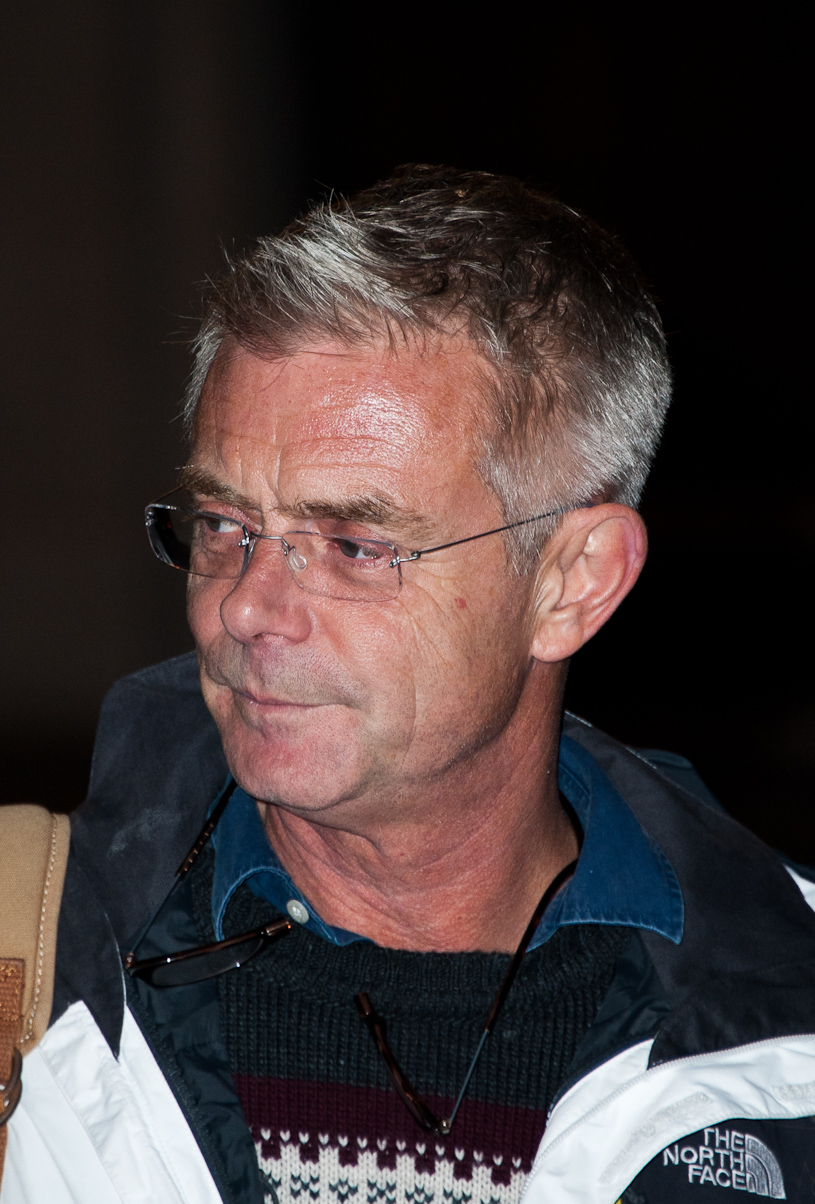
- Daldry in 2013
- Born: Stephen David Daldry; 2 May 1960 (age 66); Dorset, England
- Education: University of Sheffield; East 15 Acting School, University of Essex
- Occupations: Director, producer
- Years active: 1985–present
- Spouse: Lucy Sexton (m. 2001)
- Children: 1

Stephen David Daldry CBE (born 2 May 1960) is an English director and producer of film, theatre, and television. His accolades include two BAFTA Awards, two Emmy Awards, a Laurence Olivier Award and three Tony Awards as well as nominations for three Academy Awards and two Golden Globe Awards. He was made a Commander of the Order of the British Empire (CBE) by Queen Elizabeth II in 2003.

He started his career on stage as a theatre apprentice in the 1980s before co-founding the Metro Theatre Company. He then became artistic directors of Gate Theatre from 1990 to 1992 and the Royal Court Theatre from 1992 to 1998. For his work on the West End, he won the Laurence Olivier Award for Best Director for The Inheritance in 2019 and was Olivier-nominated for Billy Elliot the Musical in 2000 and The Audience in 2013. On Broadway, he earned three Tony Awards, two for Best Direction of a Play for An Inspector Calls (1994) and The Inheritance (2020) and one for Best Direction of a Musical for Billy Elliott the Musical (2009). He also directed production of The Audience (2013–2015) and Skylight (2014–2015).

On film, he made his directorial debut with his short film Eight (1998) which was nominated for the BAFTA Award for Best Short Film. He went on to be nominated for three Academy Awards for Best Director, for the musical film adaptation Billy Elliot (2000), the period drama The Hours (2002), and the romance drama The Reader (2008). He also directed the dramas Extremely Loud & Incredibly Close (2011) and Trash (2014).

From 2016 to 2020, he produced and directed the Netflix television series The Crown, for which he received one Producers Guild Award nomination, one Producers Guild Award win, six Primetime Emmy Award nominations, and two Primetime Emmy Awards win for Outstanding Directing for a Drama Series and Outstanding Drama Series. Thus Daldry has been recognised for his direction by nominations for theatre, television, and film.

== Early life and education ==
Daldry was born on May 2, 1960, in Dorset, the son of singer Cherry (née Thompson) and bank manager Patrick Daldry. The family moved to Taunton, Somerset, where his father died of cancer when Daldry was aged 14.

Daldry joined a youth theatre group in Taunton, Somerset and performed as Sandy Tyrell in Hay Fever for the local amateur society, Taunton Thespians. At age 18, he won a Royal Air Force scholarship to read English at the University of Sheffield, where he became chairman of the Sheffield University Theatre Group.

After graduation, he spent a year travelling through Italy, where he became a clown's apprentice. He then trained as an actor on the postgraduate course at East 15 Acting School from 1982 to 1983, now part of the University of Essex.

== Career ==
=== 1985–1999: Artistic director and theatrical works ===
Daldry began his career as an apprentice at the Sheffield Crucible from 1985 to 1988, working under artistic director Clare Venables. He also headed productions at the Manchester Library Theatre, Liverpool Playhouse, Stratford East, Oxford Stage, Brighton and the Edinburgh Fringe Festival. He was artistic director of the Royal Court Theatre from 1992 to 1998, where he headed the £26 million development scheme. He was also artistic director of London's Gate Theatre (1989–92) and the Metro Theatre Company (1984–86). He is currently on the Board of the Young and Old Vic Theatres and remains an associate director of the Royal Court Theatre. He was the Cameron Mackintosh Visiting professor of Contemporary Theatre for 2002 at St Catherine's College, Oxford.

=== 2000–2011: Hollywood breakthrough and success ===
Daldry made his feature film directorial debut with Billy Elliot (2000), which launched the film career of Jamie Bell. His next film was The Hours, which earned Nicole Kidman her first Best Actress win at the Academy Awards. He went on to direct a stage musical adaptation of Billy Elliot, and in 2009 his work earned him a Tony Award for Best Director of a Musical. He has also made a film version of The Reader (2008), based on the book of the same name and starring Kate Winslet, David Kross and Ralph Fiennes. The film won Best Actress at the Academy Awards for Kate Winslet. Daldry's fourth film was Extremely Loud & Incredibly Close, an adaptation of the book of the same name written by Jonathan Safran Foer, starring Tom Hanks, Sandra Bullock, and Max von Sydow. The screenplay was written by Eric Roth. The film received a nomination for Best Picture at the 84th Academy Awards and a nomination for von Sydow for Best Supporting Actor.

=== 2013–2023: Prestige works on stage and The Crown ===
Daldry directed with the Royal National Theatre the original 2013 West End production of the Peter Morgan play The Audience starring Dame Helen Mirren portraying Queen Elizabeth II at various stages during her tenure. The production received five Laurence Olivier Award nominations including for Daldry for Best Director. The production transferred to Broadway in 2015 at the Gerald Schoenfeld Theatre with Mirren reprising her role. During this time, Daldry also directed the West End revival of the David Hare play Skylight starring Carey Mulligan and Bill Nighy at the Wyndham's Theatre. The production received acclaim as well as a nomination for the Laurence Olivier Award for Best Revival. It made its Broadway transfer that same year at the John Golden Theatre earning seven Tony Award nominations including for Daldry for Best Direction of a Play.

From 2016 to 2023, Daldry directed several episodes of the Peter Morgan created Netflix historical drama series The Crown starring Claire Foy, Olivia Colman, and Imelda Staunton as Queen Elizabeth II during her reign. He received two Primetime Emmy Awards for his work on the series including the Primetime Emmy Award for Outstanding Directing for a Drama Series for the episode "Paterfamilias" in 2018. The following year he directed the Matthew López epic play The Inheritance which was inspired by the 1910 novel Howards End by E. M. Forster. The play premiered in London at the Young Vic in 2018 where Daldry earned the Laurence Olivier Award for Best Director. The production transferred Broadway in the fall of 2019 where it earned acclaim as well as the Tony Award for Best Direction of a Play.

=== 2024–present: Franchise work ===
Daldry was initially slated to direct a Star Wars spin off film about Star Wars character Obi-Wan Kenobi but the film was later scrapped due to the commercial failure of Solo: A Star Wars Story. However, ideas from Daldry's originally planned film were repurposed for the Obi-Wan Kenobi Disney + limited series directed by Deborah Chow and released in 2022. Daldry received credit as a consulting producer. In July 2022, it was revealed that Daldry would work with Sonia Friedman to develop a play based on the hit Netflix television show Stranger Things. The play entitled Stranger Things: The First Shadow premiered in December 2023 at the Phoenix Theatre in London's West End.

== Personal life ==
Daldry was in a relationship with set designer Ian MacNeil for 13 years. They met at an outdoor production of Alice in Wonderland in Lancaster in 1988 and, after settling in Camberwell, began collaborating on theatrical productions.

Daldry married American performance artist and magazine editor Lucy Sexton, with whom he had a daughter. However, he continued to refer to himself as gay, saying the public "[doesn't] like confusion". He has also suggested that the pair married so he could get health insurance, despite receiving this through his DGA affiliation.

== Credits ==
=== Film ===
Year	Title	Distribution
1998	Eight	Working Title Films
2000	Billy Elliot	Universal Pictures
2002	The Hours	Miramax Films
2008	The Reader	The Weinstein Company
2011	Extremely Loud & Incredibly Close	Warner Bros. Pictures
2014	Trash	Universal Pictures
2021	Together	BBC Film / Bleecker Street

=== Television ===
Year	Title	Notes
2012	Games of the XXX Olympiad Opening Ceremony	"Isles of Wonder"
2012	Games of the XXX Olympiad Closing Ceremony	"A Symphony of British Music"
2016–23	The Crown	5 episodes
2022	Obi-Wan Kenobi	Consulting Producer

=== Theatre ===
Broadway productions

Year	Title	Theatre	Notes
1994	An Inspector Calls	Booth Theatre	Broadway
1999	Via Dolorosa	Booth Theatre	Broadway
2008	Billy Elliot: The Musical	Imperial Theatre	Broadway
2015	Skylight	John Golden Theatre	Broadway
2015	The Audience	Gerald Schoenfeld Theatre	Broadway
2019	The Inheritance	Ethel Barrymore Theater	Broadway
2025	Stranger Things: The First Shadow	Marquis Theatre	Broadway

West End productions

Year	Title	Theatre	Notes
2005	Billy Elliot: The Musical	Victoria Palace Theatre	West End
2013	The Audience	Gielgud Theatre	West End
2014	Skylight	Wyndham's Theatre	West End
2015	The Audience	Apollo Theatre	West End
2019	The Inheritance	Noël Coward Theatre	West End
2023	Stranger Things: The First Shadow	Phoenix Theatre	West End
2025	Kyoto	@sohoplace	West End

Detailed theatreography

Year	Title	Theatre	Notes
1988	The Ragged Trousered Philanthropists	Liverpool Playhouse	Liverpool
1988	An Inspector Calls	York Theatre Royal	York
1989	Judgement Day	Old Red Lion Theatre	London
1990	Figaro Gets Divorced	Gate Theatre	London
1990	Cutting Room	Royal Court Theatre Upstairs	London
1991	Our Man in Marzibah / Rousseau's Tale	Gate Theatre	Ireland
1991	Damned for Despair	Gate Theatre	Ireland
1991	Jerker	Gate Theatre	Ireland
1991	Pioneers in Ingolstadt	Gate Theatre	Ireland
1991	Purgatory in Ingolstadt	Gate Theatre	Ireland
1992	Manon Lescaut	Dublin Grand Opera	Ireland
1992	An Inspector Calls	Lyttelton Theatre	London
1993	Search and Destroy	Royal Court Theatre Upstairs	London
1993	Machinal	Lyttelton Theatre	London
1993	The Europeans	Greenwich Theatre	London
1994	The Kitchen	Royal Court Theatre	Off West End
1994	The Editing Process	Royal Court Theatre	Off West End
1995	Rat in the Skull	Duke of York's Theatre	London
1995	The Libertine	Royal Court Theatre	Off West End
1995	The Man of Mode	Royal Court Theatre	Off West End
1996	Body Talk	Royal Court Theatre	Off West End
1997	This Is a Chair	London International Festival	London
1998	Via Dolorosa	Royal Court Theatre	Off West End
2000	Far Away	Royal Court Theatre	Off West End
2002–03	Far Away	New York Theatre Workshop	Off-Broadway
2002	A Number	Royal Court Theatre	Off West End
2002–03	A Number	New York Theatre Workshop	Off-Broadway
2017–18	The Jungle	Young Vic	London
2018	The Jungle	St. Ann's Warehouse	Off-Broadway
2024	Kyoto	Swan Theatre	Stratford-upon-Avon

== Awards and honours ==
Awards and nominations received by Daldry's films
Year	Title	Academy Awards		BAFTA Awards		Golden Globes Awards	
Year	Title	Nominations	Wins	Nominations	Wins	Nominations	Wins
2000	Billy Elliot	3		13	3	2	
2002	The Hours	9	1	11	2	7	2
2008	The Reader	5	1	5	1	4	1
2011	Extremely Loud & Incredibly Close	2					
2014	Trash			1			
2021	Together			1	1		
Total		19	2	31	7	13	3

Directed Academy Award performances
Under Daldry's direction, these actors have received Academy Award nominations and wins for their performances in their respective roles.

Year	Performer	Film	Result
Academy Award for Best Actress
2002	Nicole Kidman	The Hours	Won
2008	Kate Winslet	The Reader	Won
Academy Award for Best Supporting Actor
2002	Ed Harris	The Hours	Nominated
2011	Max von Sydow	Extremely Loud & Incredibly Close	Nominated
Academy Award for Best Supporting Actress
2000	Julie Walters	Billy Elliot	Nominated
2002	Julianne Moore	The Hours	Nominated

== See also ==
- List of Academy Award winners and nominees from Great Britain
