= Sonia Friedman =

British theatre producer (born 1965)

Sonia Friedman CBE
- Born: Sonia Anne Primrose Freedman; UK
- Education: Royal Central School of Speech and Drama
- Occupation: Theatre producer
- Relatives: Maria Friedman (sister)

Sonia Friedman CBE is a British West End and Broadway theatre producer, hailed as a Variety500 Honoree seven years in a row, as well as "the most powerful producer working in theater" by the New York Times in 2025. Friedman was also listed as one of Vogue’s 25 most influential women working today in 2025. On 27 January 2017, Friedman was named Producer of the Year for the third year running at The Stage Awards, becoming the first person to win the award three times. In 2018, Friedman was featured in "TIME100", Time Magazine's 100 Most Influential People of 2018 and was named Broadway Briefing's Show Person of the Year. In 2019, Sonia Friedman Productions was ranked The Stage 's most influential theatre producer in The Stage 100. Sonia Friedman CBE was featured in The Standard 100, a celebratory feature of the key power players shaping London in 2024.. As of June 2026, Sonia Friedman Productions has developed, initiated and led over 300 productions. As lead producer, SFP have won a record-breaking 74 Laurence Olivier Awards, 62 Tony Awards and 381 major theatre awards worldwide.

== Early life ==
Friedman is the youngest of four children of Clair Llewelyn (née Sims), a concert pianist, and violinist Leonard Freedman (who later changed his name to Friedman), who was leader of the Royal Philharmonic Orchestra under Sir Thomas Beecham and co-founder of many national institutions including the Scottish Chamber Orchestra and Scottish Baroque Ensemble. Her father was from a Russian-Jewish immigrant family, and her mother is English. She is the younger sister of the actress and director Maria Friedman, the great violinist Richard Friedman, and Dr Sarah Beecham.

== Career ==
=== Theatre producer ===
After working at the National Theatre between 1988 and 1993 (fulfilling the various roles of stage management, Education Manager, Head of Education and Producer of Mobile Productions and Theatre for Young People), she co-founded the new writing theatre company Out of Joint in 1993 with Max Stafford-Clark. From 1998, Friedman worked as a producer for the Ambassador Theatre Group. She launched her own theatre company, Sonia Friedman Productions, in 2002. As of June 2026, Sonia Friedman Productions has developed, initiated and led over 300 productions. As lead producer, SFP have won a record-breaking 74 Laurence Olivier Awards, 62 Tony Awards and 381 major theatre awards worldwide.

At the 2014 Olivier Awards, Sonia Friedman Productions made Olivier Awards history by winning the most awards for any producer and for winning prizes for Best New Play (Chimerica), Best New Musical (The Book of Mormon), Best Play Revival (Ghosts) and Best Musical Revival (Merrily We Roll Along). In 2017, Friedman won producer of the year at The Stage Awards for a third year (becoming the first person to win the award three times), and was listed as no. 1 on The Stage power list, the second solo female to hold this position in the award's history and becoming the first person to top the list that wasn't a theatre owner.

SFP productions and co-productions received an unprecedented 31 nominations in the 2017 Olivier Awards – including a record-breaking 11 for Harry Potter and the Cursed Child – the most nominated new play in Olivier history. The show went on to win 9 Olivier Awards – the most ever for one production.

In 2018, Friedman was awarded the Equity Services to Theatre Award at the 18th Annual WhatsOnStage Awards, and was featured in Time Magazine's 100 Most Influential People in the World.

== Honours ==
Friedman was appointed Officer of the Order of the British Empire (OBE) in the 2016 Birthday Honours for services to theatre and Commander of the Order of the British Empire (CBE) in the 2023 New Year Honours, also for services to theatre.

== Personal life ==
She is the younger sister of director/actress/singer Maria Friedman, violinist Richard Friedman, and Sarah Beecham.

== Theatre credits ==
- Accidental Death of an Anarchist (1990)
- Tartuffe (1991)
- The Queen and I (1994)
- The Libertine (1995)
- Shopping and Fucking (1996)
- Blue Kettle / Heart's Desire (1997)
- The Steward of Christendom (1997)
- Three Sisters (1997)
- Spoonface Steinberg (1999)
- Speed the Plow (2000)
- Noises Off (2000)
- A Day in the Death of Joe Egg (2001)
- Benefactors (2002)
- Up For Grabs (2002)
- Afterplay (2002)
- What the Night Is For (2002)
- Macbeth (2002)
- Ragtime (2003)
- A Day in the Death of Joe Egg (2003), on Broadway
- Sexual Perversity in Chicago (2003)
- Absolutely! (Perhaps) (2003)
- Hitchcock Blonde (2003)
- See You Next Tuesday (2003)
- Jumpers (2003)
- Calico (2004)
- Endgame (2004)
- Guantánamo (2004)
- The Woman in White (2004)
- By the Bog of Cats (2005)
- Whose Life Is It Anyway? (2005)
- The Home Place (2005)
- As You Like It (2005)
- Shoot the Crow (2005)
- Celebration (2005)
- Otherwise Engaged (2005)
- The Woman in White (2005) on Broadway
- Donkeys' Years (2006)
- On the Third Day (2006)
- Eh Joe (2006)
- Bent (2006)
- Faith Healer (2006), on Broadway; nominated for a Best Revival Tony Award
- Love Song (2006)
- Rock 'n' Roll (2006)
- King of Hearts (2007)
- The Dumb Waiter (2007)
- Boeing-Boeing (2007)
- In Celebration (2007)
- Rock 'n' Roll (2007), on Broadway
- Is He Dead? (2007), on Broadway
- Donkeys' Years (2007)
- Hergé's Adventures of Tintin, a musical version of Tintin in Tibet (2007)
- Dealer's Choice (2007)
- Boeing-Boeing (2008), in Australia
- Boeing-Boeing (2008), on Broadway
- That Face (2008)
- Under the Blue Sky (2008)
- The Seagull (2008), on Broadway
- No Man's Land (2008)
- La Cage Aux Folles (2008)
- Maria Friedman: Re-Arranged (2008)
- Boeing-Boeing (2009), UK tour
- Dancing at Lughnasa (2009)
- A View from the Bridge (2009)
- A Little Night Music (2009)
- The Norman Conquests (2009), on Broadway
- The Mountaintop (2009)
- Arcadia (2009)
- Othello (2009)
- Prick Up Your Ears (2009)
- After Miss Julie (2009), on Broadway
- Legally Blonde (2009)
- A Little Night Music, on Broadway (2009)
- Jerusalem (2010)
- Private Lives (2010)
- The Prisoner of Second Avenue (2010)
- All My Sons (2010)
- A View from the Bridge (2010), on Broadway
- Shirley Valentine and Educating Rita (2010)
- La Bête (2010), and on Broadway
- A Flea in Her Ear (2010)
- La Cage aux Folles (2010) on Broadway
- The Children's Hour (2011)
- Clybourne Park (2011)
- Arcadia (2011), on Broadway
- Jerusalem (2011), on Broadway
- The Book of Mormon (2011), on Broadway
- Much Ado About Nothing (2011)
- Betrayal (2011)
- Top Girls (2011)
- La Cage Aux Folles (2011–12), US tour
- The Mountaintop (2011), on Broadway
- Jerusalem (2011–2012)
- Master Class (2012)
- Absent Friends (2012)
- Hay Fever (2012)
- Death of a Salesman (2012), on Broadway
- Nice Work If You Can Get It (2012–2013), on Broadway
- The Sunshine Boys (2012)
- A Chorus of Disapproval (2012–2013)
- Richard the Third (2012–2013)
- Twelfth Night (2012–2013)
- Old Times (2013)
- The Book of Mormon (2013, 2014, 2015, 2016, 2017, 2018)
- Merrily We Roll Along (2013)
- Chimerica (2013)
- The Sunshine Boys (2013), Los Angeles
- Twelfth Night & Richard III (2013), on Broadway
- Mojo (2013)
- Ghosts (2013)
- 1984 (2013)
- Shakespeare in Love (2014)
- King Charles III (2014)
- Electra, Frank McGuinness translation (2014)
- Sunny Afternoon (2014)
- The River (2014), on Broadway
- The Nether (2014)
- Ghosts (2013), New York
- Bend It Like Beckham (2015)
- 1984 (2015)
- Hamlet (2015)
- Farinelli and the King (2015)
- King Charles III (2015), on Broadway
- A Christmas Carol (2015)
- Funny Girl (2016)
- 1984 (2016)
- Harry Potter and the Cursed Child (2016, 2017, 2018)
- Sunny Afternoon UK Tour (2016)
- Nice Fish (2016)
- Dreamgirls (2016, 2017, 2018)
- The Glass Menagerie (2017)
- Travesties (2017)
- Funny Girl UK Tour (2017)
- Who's Afraid of Virginia Woolf? (2017)
- The Ferryman (2017), at Royal Court Theatre
- Our Ladies of Perpetual Succour (2017)
- The Ferryman (2017, 2018), at Gielgud Theatre
- Hamlet (2017), at Harold Pinter Theatre
- 1984 (2017), New York
- Ink (2017/2018), at Duke of York's Theatre
- Farinelli and the King (2017, 2018), in New York
- The Birthday Party (2018), at Harold Pinter Theatre
- Mean Girls (2018), in New York
- Travesties (2018), in New York
- Harry Potter and the Cursed Child (2018) in New York
- Harry Potter and the Cursed Child (2019) in Melbourne
- The Ferryman (2018), at Bernard B. Jacobs Theatre in New York
- The Jungle (2018), at Playhouse Theatre
- Consent (2018), at the Harold Pinter Theatre
- The Inheritance (2018), at the Noel Coward
- Summer and Smoke (2018), at Duke of York's Theatre
- The Jungle (2018), at St. Ann's Warehouse, New York
- All About Eve (2019), at the Noel Coward
- Fiddler on the Roof (2019), at The Playhouse Theatre
- Rosmersholm (2019), at Duke of York's Theatre
- The Jungle (2019), at San Francisco's Curran
- Harry Potter and the Cursed Child (2019) in San Francisco
- The Book of Mormon (2019-2020), UK & European tour
- The Inheritance (2019), at Ethel Barrymore Theater, New York
- Harry Potter and the Cursed Child (2020) in Hamburg
- Uncle Vanya (2020), at Harold Pinter Theatre
- Leopoldstadt (2020), at Harold Pinter Theatre
- Dreamgirls UK Tour from 2021
- The Comeback (2020), at Noël Coward Theatre
- Walden (2021), RE:EMERGE Season at Harold Pinter Theatre
- J'Ouvert (2021), RE:EMERGE Season at Harold Pinter Theatre
- Anna X (2021), RE:EMERGE Season at Harold Pinter Theatre
- The Shark Is Broken (2021), at The Ambassadors Theatre
- To Kill a Mockingbird (2022), at Gielgud Theatre
- Jerusalem (2022), at Apollo Theatre
- Harry Potter and the Cursed Child (2022), in Toronto
- Harry Potter and the Cursed Child (2023), in Tokyo, Japan
- Oklahoma! (2022), at the Young Vic Theatre
- The 47th (2022), at The Old Vic
- Mean Girls (2022), US Tour
- Jerusalem (2022), at the Apollo Theatre
- Funny Girl (2022), on Broadway
- Merrily We Roll Along (2022), at The New York Theatre Workshop
- Hamlet (2022), at Park Avenue Armory
- Oresteia (2022), at Park Avenue Armory
- Eureka Day (2022), at The Old Vic
- The Piano Lesson (2022), at St James Theatre
- Leopoldstadt (2022), at Longacre Theatre
- Funny Girl US tour (from 2023)
- Rodgers & Hammerstein's Oklahoma! (2023), at Wyndham's Theatre
- Patriots (2023), at Noël Coward Theatre
- New York, New York (2023), at St James Theatre
- The Secret Life of Bees (2023), at the Almeida
- Dr Semmelweis (2023), at Harold Pinter Theatre
- Merrily We Roll Along (2023), at Hudson Theatre
- The Shark Is Broken (2023), at John Golden Theatre
- Lyonesse (2023) at Harold Pinter Theatre
- Stranger Things: The First Shadow, a co-production with Netflix (2023), at Phoenix Theatre
- The Hills of California (2024), at Harold Pinter Theatre
- Mean Girls (2024), at Savoy Theatre
- Patriots (2024), at Ethel Barrymore Theatre, Broadway
- Stereophonic (2024), at John Golden Theatre
- Here There Are Blueberries (2024), at New York Theatre Workshop
- Fangirls (2024), at Lyric Hammersmith
- Shifters (2024), at Duke of York's Theatre
- The Hills of California (2024), at Broadhurst Theatre
- Oedipus (2024), at Wyndham's Theatre
- Juno and the Paycock (2024), at Gielgud Theatre
- Bust (2025), at Alliance Theatre and Goodman Theatre
- Millions (2025), at Alliance Theatre
- The Years (2025), at Harold Pinter Theatre
- The Shark is Broken (2025), UK and Ireland tour
- Manhunt (2025), at Royal Court
- Stranger Things: The First Shadow (2025), at Marquis Theatre
- Sexual Misconduct of the Middle Classes (2025), at Audible's Minetta Lane Theatre
- Creditors (2025), at Audible's Minetta Lane Theatre
- Mrs. Warren's Profession (2025), at Garrick Theatre
- Stereophonic (2025), at Duke of York's Theatre
- Dead Outlaw (2025), at Longacre Theatre
- Sunny Afternoon (2025), UK tour
- The Importance of Being Earnest (2025), at Noël Coward Theatre
- Stereophonic (2025), US tour
- Oedipus (2025), Broadway
- Paddington The Musical (2025), at Savoy Theatre
- Mean Girls (2025/2026), UK & Ireland tour
- John Proctor is the Villain (2026), at Royal Court
- 1536 (2026), at Ambassadors Theatre
- Sexual Misconduct of the Middle Classes (2026), at Audible's Minetta Lane Theater
- What Happened Was... (2026), at Audible's Minetta Lane Theater
- New Born (2026), at Audible's Minetta Lane Theater
- Arcadia (2026), at The Duke of York's Theatre
- Thelma & Louise (2026), at Young Vic Theatre
- Edward Albee's Who's Afraid of Virginia Woolf? (2026), at @sohoplace
- Rent (2025), West End
- The Cherry Orchard (2026), at Harold Pinter Theatre
- The Lives of Others (2026), at Adelphi Theatre
- The Popinjay Cavalier (2027), West End
- John Proctor is the Villain (2027), at Wyndham's Theatre
- Dreamgirls (2026), Broadway

== TV and film credits ==
- Wolf Hall (2015)
- The Dresser (2015)
- King Lear (2018)
- Uncle Vanya (2020)
- J'Ouvert (2021)
- Together (2021)
- Merrily We Roll Along (2025)
- A Friend Called Dorothy (2025)

== Awards ==
=== Lifetime Achievement ===
- Freedom of the City of London, 2026
- Golden Plate Award, American Academy of Achievement, 2026

=== Olivier Awards ===
- PADDINGTON The Musical, Best New Musical, 2026
- Oedipus, Best Revival, 2025
- Stranger Things: The First Shadow, Best New Entertainment/Comedy Play, 2024
- Rodgers & Hammerstein's Oklahoma!, Best Musical Revival, 2023
- Leopoldstadt, Best New Play, 2020
- Fiddler on the Roof, Best Musical Revival, 2020
- The Inheritance, Best New Play, 2019
- Summer and Smoke, Best Revival, 2019
- The Ferryman, Best New Play, 2018
- Harry Potter and the Cursed Child, Best New Play, 2017
- Sunny Afternoon, Best New Musical, 2015
- King Charles III, Best New Play, 2015
- The Book of Mormon, Best New Musical, 2014
- Chimerica, Best New Play, 2014
- Ghosts, Best Revival, 2014
- Merrily We Roll Along, Best Musical Revival, 2014
- Legally Blonde, Best New Musical, 2011
- The Mountaintop, Best New Play, 2010
- La Cage Aux Folles, Best Musical Revival, 2009

=== Tony Awards ===
- Eureka Day, Best Revival of a Play, 2025
- Merrily We Roll Along, Best Revival of a Musical, 2024
- Stereophonic, Best Play, 2024
- Leopoldstadt, Best Play, 2023
- The Inheritance, Best Play, 2020–21
- The Ferryman, Best Play, 2019
- Harry Potter and the Cursed Child, Best Play, 2018
- A View from the Bridge, Best Revival of a Play, 2016
- The Humans, Best Play, 2016
- A Raisin in the Sun, Best Revival of a Play, 2014
- Death of a Salesman, Best Revival of a Play, 2012
- The Book Of Mormon, Best Musical, 2011
- La Cage Aux Folles, Best Revival of a Musical, 2010
- The Norman Conquests, Best Revival of a Play, 2009
- Boeing-Boeing, Best Revival of a Play, 2008

=== Bafta Television Awards ===
- Drama Series, Together, 2022
- Drama Series, Wolf Hall, 2016

=== The Stage Awards ===
- Producer of the year, Sonia Friedman, 2019
- Producer of the year, Sonia Friedman, 2017
- Producer of the year, Sonia Friedman, 2016
- Producer of the year, Sonia Friedman, 2015

=== Evening Standard Awards ===
- Rodgers and Hammerstein's Oklahoma!, Best Musical, 2022
- The Inheritance, Best Play, 2018
- The Ferryman, Best Play, 2017
- Harry Potter and the Cursed Child, Best Play, 2016
- Jerusalem, Best Play, 2009
- Home Place, Brian Friel, Best Play, 2005

=== Drama Desk Awards ===
- Eureka Day, Outstanding Revival of a Play, 2025
- Stereophonic, Outstanding Play, 2024
- The Piano Lesson, Outstanding Revival of a Play, 2023
- Leopoldstadt, Outstanding Play, 2023
- The Inheritance, Outstanding Play, 2020
- The Ferryman, Outstanding Play, 2019
- Harry Potter and the Cursed Child, Outstanding New Broadway Play, 2018
- Death of a Salesman, Outstanding Revival of a Play, 2012
- The Book of Mormon, Outstanding Musical, 2011
- La Cage aux Folles, Outstanding Revival of a Musical, 2010
- A View From the Bridge, Outstanding Revival of a Play, 2010
- The Norman Conquests, Outstanding Revival of a Play, 2009
- Boeing-Boeing, Outstanding Revival of a Play, 2008

=== Critics' Circle Awards ===
- PADDINGTON The Musical, Best New Musical, 2026
- Rodgers & Hammerstein's Oklahoma!, Best Musical, 2023
- Patriots, Best New Play, 2023
- The Inheritance, Best New Play, 2018
- The Ferryman, Best New Play, 2017
- Bend It Like Beckham, Best Musical, 2015
- King Charles III, Best New Play, 2014
- Chimerica, Best New Play, 2013
- Merrily We Roll Along, Best Musical, 2012
- Clybourne Park, Best New Play, 2011
- Jerusalem, Best New Play, 2010
- La Cage Aux Folles, Best Musical, 2009

=== WhatsOnStage Awards ===
- PADDINGTON The Musical, Best New Musical, 2026
- Rodgers & Hammerstein's Oklahoma!, Best Musical Revival, 2023
- The Inheritance, Best New Play, 2019
- Sonia Friedman, Equity Services to Theatre Award, 2018
- Harry Potter and the Cursed Child, Best West End Show, 2018
- The Ferryman, Best New Play, 2018
- Hamlet, Best Play Revival, 2018
- Harry Potter and the Cursed Child, Best New Play, 2017
- Funny Girl, Best Musical Revival, 2017
- Hamlet, Best Play Revival, 2016
- Shakespeare in Love, Best New Play, 2015
- The Book of Mormon, Best New Musical, 2014
- Twelfth Night, Best Shakespearean Production, 2013
- Much Ado About Nothing, David Tennant and Catherine Tate reuniting on stage, Theatre Event of the Year, 2012
- Much Ado About Nothing, Best Shakespearean Production, 2012
- Legally Blonde, by Nell Benjamin, Lawrence O’Keefe & Heather Hach, Best New Musical, 2011
- Jerusalem, by Jez Butterworth, Best New Play, 2010
- Under The Blue Sky, by David Eldridge, Best New Play, 2009
- Rock ‘n’ Roll, by Tom Stoppard, Best New Play, 2007
- Up For Grabs, Madonna's West End debut, Theatre Event of the Year, 2003
- A Day in the Death of Joe Egg, Best Play Revival, 2002

=== Black British Theatre Awards ===
- Shifters, Best Production - Play, 2025

=== South Bank Sky Arts Awards ===
- Uncle Vanya, 2021
- The Inheritance, 2019
- The Jungle, 2018
- Harry Potter and the Cursed Child, 2017
- King Charles III, 2015

=== Outer Critics Circle Awards ===
- Stereophonic, Best Play, David Adjmi, 2024
- Stereophonic, Outstanding New Broadway Play, David Adjmi, 2024
- Leopoldstadt, Outstanding New Broadway Play, 2023
- The Inheritance, Outstanding New Broadway Play, 2020
- The Ferryman, Outstanding New Broadway Play, 2019
- Harry Potter and the Cursed Child, Outstanding New Broadway Play, 2018

=== New York Drama Critics' Circle Awards ===
- Stereophonic, Best Play, 2024
- Merrily We Roll Along, Special Citation, 2024
- The Ferryman, Best Play, 2019

=== Drama League Awards ===
- Merrily We Roll Along, Outstanding Revival of a Musical, 2024
- Leopoldstadt, Outstanding Production of a Play, 2023
- The Inheritance, Outstanding Production of a Play, 2020
- The Ferryman, Outstanding Production of a Broadway or Off-Broadway Play, 2019
- Harry Potter and the Cursed Child, Outstanding Production of a Broadway or Off-Broadway Play, 2018
