= Rufus Wright =

English actor

Rufus Gerrard-Wright, known as Rufus Wright, is an English film, stage and television actor, and an audiobook narrator.

== Personal life ==
Wright is the son of Major-General Richard Gerrard-Wright and his wife, Susan (née Young). He is the younger brother of Lance Gerrard-Wright, who was the second husband of television presenter Ulrika Jonsson. Both brothers attended Lambrook Preparatory School at Winkfield Row in Berkshire.

Wright is married to actress Melanie Gutteridge.

== Filmography ==
Film roles
Year	Title	Role	Notes
2001	Spy Game	Folger's Secretary	
2008	Christie	Bill Godfrey	Short film
2008	Quantum of Solace	Treasury Agent	
2010	15 Seconds	Ben	Short film
2011	Swinging with the Finkels	Rufas	
2013	National Theatre Live: The Audience	David Cameron	Video
2014	The Face of an Angel	William	
2015	45 Years	Jake	
2015	Narcopolis	Mason	
2016	Arcadia	Ryder	
2016	Rogue One	Lieutenant Casido	
2016	Assassin's Creed	Alex	
2017	War Machine	Lt. Col. Frank Groom	
2018	Together	Dr. Ellis	
2018	Blue Iguana	Katherine's Ex	
2021	Operation Mincemeat	Lt. Bill Jewell	
2022	National Theatre Live: The Corn Is Green	The Squire	
2022	National Theatre Live: Much Ado About Nothing	Leonato	
2022	Stella	Oswald Mosley	
2024	National Theatre at Home: London Tide	Mortimer Lightwood	

Television roles
Year	Title	Role	Notes
1999	Boyz Unlimited	Male Journalist	Episode: #1.4
2000	Bomber	Capt. Hugh Smith	Television film
2002	The Secret	Priest	Episode: #1.2
2002	The Prosecutors: In Pursuit of Justice	(unknown)	Episode: "Career Criminal"
2003	P.O.W.	Doctor Evans	Episode: #1.5
2004	Iron Jawed Angels	Confederate Veteran	Television film
2004	Days That Shook the World	First White House Guard	Episode: "Terror: Made in America"
2005	The Quatermass Experiment	Understudy	Television film
2006	Extras	Fran	Episode: "Sir Ian McKellen"
2007	Fanny Hill	Mr. Norbert	Mini-series; episode 2
2007	Doctors	James Maslin	Episode: "Samaritan"
2008	The Bill	DS Ronnie Mayhew	Episode: "Going Under"
2009	Taking the Flak	Clive Haslam	Episode: "Enter the Lion"
2009	The Thick of It	Gavin Boyes	Episode: #3.6
2010	Five Daughters	Arresting Officer	Mini-series; episode 3
2010	The Special Relationship	British Journalist	Television film
2010, 2014	Miranda	Vicar	2 episodes: "Before I Die" and "I Do, But to Who?"
2011	White Van Man	Jeremy	Episode: "The Stand"
2011	New Tricks	DI Mathew Hornby	Episode: "Half Life"
2012	EastEnders	DS Luke Crisp	12 episodes
2012	Little Crackers	Art Director	Episode: "Joanna Lumley's Little Cracker: Baby, Be Blonde"
2013	Foyle's War	Dr. Ian Ross	Episode: "The Cage"
2013	Elementary	Lawrence Pendry	Episode: "Step Nine"
2013	Lucan	Younger John Burke	Mini-series; 2 episodes
2014	Doctors	Russell Redmond	Episode: "Ditched"
2016	Maigret	Minister Morel	Episode: "Maigret Sets a Trap"
2016	Harley and the Davidsons	CH Lang	Mini-series; 3 episodes
2017	Outlander	Captain Lewis	Episode: "Surrender"
2017	The Watchers in the Woods	Paul Carstairs	Television film
2019	Manhunt	Andrew Hadik	Episode: "The Suspect"
2019	8 Days: To the Moon and Back	Neil Armstrong	Television film
2019	Pennyworth	Duke of Windermere	3 episodes (season 1)
2021	Doctors	Dave Mercer	Episode: "Day of Reckoning"
2021	Shetland	Dr. Darren Bedford	5 episodes (series 6)
2022	Four Lives	Interviewing Detective	Mini-series; episode 1. (Also known as The Barking Murders)
2022, 2024	The Outlaws	DCI Monroe	7 episodes (series 2 and 3)
2023	Endeavour	Ch. Supt. Dominic Prettyman	Episode: "Exeunt"
2023	Ghosts	Lord Bummenbach	Episode: "Pineapple Day"
2024	The Way	Jez	Episode: "The Wait"
2024	The Marlow Murder Club	Stefan Dunwoody	3 episodes (series 1)

Voice roles
Year	Title	Role	Notes
2010	Xenoblade Chronicles	Kallian	Video game, English version
2013	Crysis 3	Cell Four	Video games
2016	Battlefield 1	Additional voices	Video games
2017	Star Wars: Battlefront II	Additional voices	Video games
2020	Assassin's Creed: Valhalla	Additional voices	Video games
2024	Central Intelligence	General Gehlen / Kim Philby	Radio drama, 3 episodes
2025	Vampire: The Masquerade – Bloodlines 2	Fletcher / Additional voices	Video game

== Selected theatre credits ==
Year	Title	Writer	Venue	Role	Notes
2013	The Audience	Peter Morgan	Gielgud Theatre	David Cameron	
2015	The Audience	Peter Morgan	Apollo Theatre	David Cameron / Tony Blair	
2023	Agreement	Owen McCafferty	Lyric Theatre, Belfast	Tony Blair	
2025	Stranger Things: The First Shadow	Kate Trefry	Phoenix Theatre, London	Principal Newby	
