= Eight (1998 film) =

- Opening titles
- Directed by: Stephen Daldry
- Written by: Tim Clague
- Produced by: Jonathan Finn
- Starring: Jack Langan-Evans; Mark E'von; Gina McKee
- Cinematography: John Pardue
- Release date: 1998
- Running time: 13 minutes
- Country: United Kingdom
- Language: English
- Budget: £100,000

Eight (stylised as Ei8ht) is a 1998 British short film directed by Stephen Daldry, written by Tim Clague and produced by Working Title Films.

== Plot ==
Eight tells the story of the life of an eight-year-old football fan who has to come to terms with living in a strange new town and the loss of his father.

Eight opens with a boy wearing what appears to be a homemade Liverpool F.C.-shirt standing on a beach with his football shouting "My name is Jonathan and I am eight!". Jonathan has no father, but says he was "a flower person who liked pots and world peas" (the knowing adult viewer appreciates this means flower power / hippie, pot (marijuana) and world peace). Jonathan's best friend is Terry, who is a Manchester United-supporter. Together they watch tapes of England in the 1998 FIFA World Cup at Terry's, since Jonathan's mum does not allow football in the house. Terry has a father that Jonathan think is "great". Jonathan has recently moved to an English coastal town. Before then he had lived in Liverpool, where his dad went regularly to the Kop. Jonathan's mum is fed up with her son's football fanaticism, and wants him to get a new hobby.

Terry's father hits him when he gets angry. Terry wishes that he was Jonathan and had no father at all. Jonathan wonders what his dad's work was. He hopes that he was a train driver, a firefighter or maybe a pilot? Terry says he probably was a "stinky caretaker at a stinky school", Jonathan calls him a liar and they depart in anger. At home, alone with a football board game, Jonathan admits that he never knew his father, he died before he was born, at a football match he was watching, possibly referring to the Hillsborough disaster. The film ends with Jonathan sitting on the beach singing "You'll Never Walk Alone".

== Awards ==
- Eight was nominated for the BAFTA Award for Best Short Film in 1999.

== History ==
Eight was made through the Jerwood Foundation after Tim Clague's script (originally called "N'That") was selected to win the Jerwood Film Prize. The film was shot on location in the Bournemouth and Poole area.
