= The Jungle (play) =

2017 play

- Written by: Joe Robertson; Joe Murphy

Premiere
- Date: 7 December 2017
- Place: Young Vic, London

The Jungle is a play by Joe Robertson and Joe Murphy. The play won the South Bank Sky Arts Award for Theatre, and the 2018 BroadwayWorld UK Award for Best New Production of a Play, and went on to win further awards.

== Plot ==
The play follows the lives of characters living in the Calais Jungle migrant camp.

== Original creative team ==
Writers	Joe Murphy, Joe Robertson
Directors	Stephen Daldry and Justin Martin
Set Design	Miriam Buether
Costume Design	Catherine Kodicek
Lighting Design	Jon Clark
Sound Design	Paul Arditti
Musical Composition	John Pfumojena
Video Design	Tristan Shepherd and Duncan McLean

== Production history ==
The Jungle premiered at the Young Vic, London running from 7 December 2017 to 9 January 2018. After a successful sold-out run, the play made a West End transfer to the Playhouse Theatre from 16 June 2018 to 3 November 2018.

The play made its Off-Broadway premiere on 4 December 2018 at St Ann's Warehouse New York, running until 27 January 2019. The Jungle then moved to The Curran San Francisco, running from 26 March 2019 to 19 May 2019, receiving positive reviews. In April 2020 the play was intended to return to St Ann's Warehouse, New York, with further plans for a US tour throughout Spring / Summer 2021, however due to the COVID-19 pandemic the production was postponed to 2023. The show ran again at St Ann's Warehouse from 18 February to 19 March, before moving to Shakespeare Theatre Company Washington DC from 28 March to April 16, 2023.

== Awards and nominations ==
Year	Production		Award	Result
2020	The Curran	San Francisco Bay Area Theatre Critics Circle Awards	Best Entire Production in the Bay Area	Won
2020	The Curran	San Francisco Bay Area Theatre Critics Circle Awards	Best Set Design (Set Design by Miriam Buether)	Won
2020	The Curran	San Francisco Bay Area Theatre Critics Circle Awards	Best Entire Production in San Francisco	Won
2020	The Curran	San Francisco Bay Area Theatre Critics Circle Awards	Ensemble	Won
2019	St Ann's Warehouse	Obie Awards	Special Citation to Cast and Creative Team	Won
2019	St Ann's Warehouse	Drama League Awards	Outstanding Production of a Broadway or Off-Broadway Play	Nominated
2019	St Ann's Warehouse	Drama League Awards	Distinguished Performance Award (Ammar Haj Ahmad and Ben Turner)	Nominated
2019	The Curran	BroadwayWorld San Francisco Award	Best Local Play	Won
2019	The Curran	BroadwayWorld San Francisco Award	Best Direction of a Play - Local (Direction by Stephen Daldry and Justin Martin)	Won
2019	The Curran	BroadwayWorld San Francisco Award	Best Featured Actor in a Play - Local (John Pfumojena)	Won
2019	The Curran	BroadwayWorld San Francisco Award	Best Featured Actress in a Play - Local (Nahel Tzegai)	Won
2019	The Curran	BroadwayWorld San Francisco Award	Best Leading Actor in A Play - Local (Ben Turner)	Won
2019	London	Mousetrap Theatre Awards	Special Recognition for Contribution to Theatre	Won
2019	London	WhatsOnStage Award	Best New Play	Nominated
2019	London	WhatsOnStage Award	Best Set Design (Set Design by Miriam Buether)	Nominated
2019	London	WhatsOnStage Award	Best Show Poster	Nominated
2019	London	Drama Desk Award	Outstanding Director of a Play (Direction by Stephen Daldry and Justin Martin)	Nominated
2019	London	Drama Desk Award	Outstanding Scenic Design of a Play (Set Design by Miriam Buether)	Nominated
2019	London	Drama Desk Award	Outstanding Lighting Design for a Play (Lighting Design by Jon Clark)	Nominated
2018	London	The Stage Debut Award	The Joe Allen Best West End Debut	Nominated
2018	London	South Bank Sky Arts Award	Theatre	Won
2018	London	BroadwayWorld UK Award	Best New Production of a Play	Won
2018	London	Evening Standard Theatre Award	Best Design (Set Design by Miriam Buether)	Won
