= Trash (2014 film) =

Crime drama film directed by Stephen Daldry

- Theatrical release poster
- Directed by: Stephen Daldry
- Screenplay by: Richard Curtis
- Based on: Trash by Andy Mulligan
- Produced by: Tim Bevan; Eric Fellner; Kris Thykier
- Starring: Wagner Moura; Selton Mello; Rooney Mara; Martin Sheen
- Cinematography: Adriano Goldman
- Edited by: Elliot Graham
- Music by: Antônio Pinto
- Production companies: Working Title Films; O2 Filmes; PeaPie Films
- Distributed by: Universal Pictures
- Release dates: 9 October 2014 (Brazil); 30 January 2015 (United Kingdom)
- Running time: 114 minutes
- Countries: United Kingdom; Brazil
- Languages: English; Portuguese
- Box office: $5.3 million

Trash is a 2014 crime drama thriller film directed by Stephen Daldry and written by Richard Curtis, based on the 2010 novel of the same name by Andy Mulligan. The film stars Rooney Mara, Martin Sheen, Wagner Moura, and Selton Mello.

== Plot ==
Trash follows three Brazilian street teenagers in Rio de Janeiro; Raphael, Gardo, and Rat (Jun-Jun) who spend their time picking through litter in the hope of finding useful waste. One day they discover a wallet whose contents bring them into conflict with the brutal local police force as they find themselves unlikely whistleblowers in a city rife with corruption.

== Cast ==
- Rooney Mara as Sister Olivia
- Martin Sheen as Father Juilliard
- Wagner Moura as José Angelico
- Selton Mello as Federico Gonz
- Stepan Nercessian as Santos
- Rickson Tevez as Raphael
- Eduardo Luis as Gardo
- Gabriel Weinstein as Rat (Jun-Jun)
- Pedro Pauleey as The Cleaner
- Nelson Xavier as Jefferson
- Leandro Firmino as Thiago

== Production ==
On 5 April 2011, Working Title Films and PeaPie Films acquired the film rights to Andy Mulligan's 2010 adventure thriller novel Trash. Screenwriter Richard Curtis was set to adapt the novel and Stephen Daldry was set to direct the film.

=== Casting ===
On 8 July 2013, Rooney Mara joined the cast to play the role of Olivia, an NGO worker. Martin Sheen signed up to play the role of Father Juilliard.

=== Filming ===
Principal photography began on 24 July 2013, in Rio de Janeiro, Brazil.

== Marketing ==
The first trailer was released on 31 July 2014.

== Release ==
The film was distributed outside of North America by Universal Pictures International. The film had its world premiere at the Rio de Janeiro International Film Festival on 7 October 2014. It was released in Brazil on 9 October 2014. and in the United Kingdom on 30 January 2015. The film was released in the United States on 9 October 2015, by Focus World in a limited release and through video on demand.

== Reception ==
On Rotten Tomatoes, it has a score of 66%, an average rating of 6/10, based on 44 reviews. The film's consensus states: "Action-packed, funny, and thought-provoking, Trash finds feel-good cinema in real-life squalor without resorting to cheap sentimentality." On Metacritic, the film holds a score of 50 out of 100, based on 18 reviews, indicating "mixed or average reviews".

== Awards ==
- 2015: BAFTA Award for Best Film Not in the English Language (nominated)
- 2014: Rome Film Festival – BNL People's Choice Award: Gala (won)
- 2014: Rome Film Festival – 'Alice in the City' Award (won)
- 2014: Camerimage – Golden Frog: Main Competition (nominated)
- 2014: Tallinn Black Nights Film Festival – Just Film Award: Best Youth Film (nominated)
