= Together (2021 TV film) =

2021 British film by Stephen Daldry

- American theatrical release poster
- Written by: Dennis Kelly
- Directed by: Stephen Daldry; Justin Martin
- Starring: James McAvoy; Sharon Horgan; Samuel Logan
- Country of origin: United Kingdom
- Original language: English

Production
- Producers: Guy Heeley; Sonia Friedman
- Running time: 87 minutes
- Production companies: BBC Film; Shoebox Films; Sonia Friedman Productions

Original release
- Network: BBC Two
- Release: 17 June 2021

Together is a 2021 British comedy-drama television film written by Dennis Kelly and directed by Stephen Daldry and Justin Martin. It stars James McAvoy and Sharon Horgan as a couple re-evaluating their relationship during the COVID-19 pandemic, with Samuel Logan making an appearance as their son, Artie. It was shot in ten days in Kensal Rise, London.

The film was broadcast in the United Kingdom on BBC Two on 17 June 2021. Upon release, it received generally positive reviews from critics, with some calling it a "claustrophobic", "brilliant", and "honest" film set during the pandemic. However, a mixed response was given on its use of monologues and fourth wall breaks. In her review, Lucy Mangan from The Guardian gave Together four stars out of five and wrote that it "captures perfectly the emotional dilapidations of a dying relationship". Together was theatrically released in the United States by Bleecker Street on 27 August 2021. The film won the British Academy Television Award for Best Single Drama.

== Premise ==
The film is set in the United Kingdom during the COVID-19 pandemic of 2020 and 2021. It follows a couple who are re-evaluating their relationship while caring for Artie, their 10-year-old son.

== Cast ==
- James McAvoy as "he", a self-employed man
- Sharon Horgan as "she", a charity worker
- Samuel Logan as Artie, the couple's 10-year-old son

== Production ==
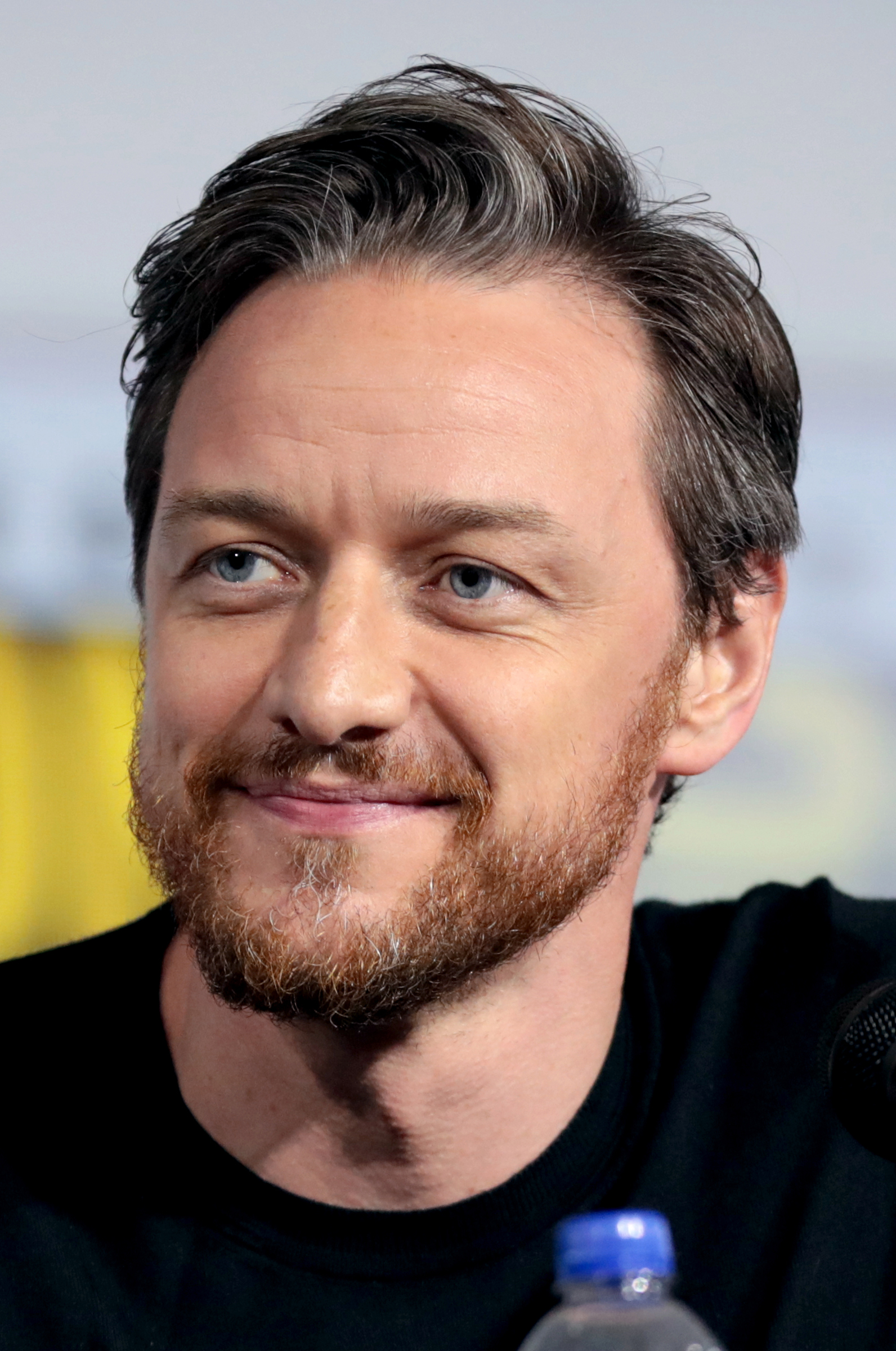
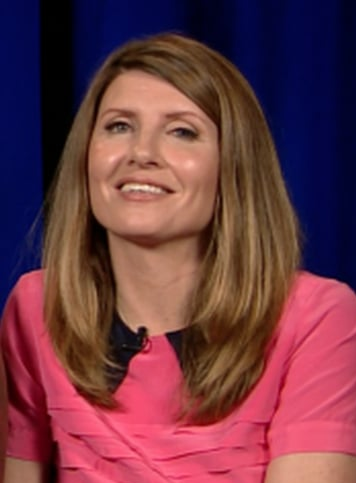
James McAvoy and Sharon Horgan portray "he" and "she", respectively

Together was officially announced on 13 May 2021, when a "first look" image was released revealing that James McAvoy and Sharon Horgan would star in the film, set during the COVID-19 pandemic, as a couple re-evaluating their relationship. On joining the cast, McAvoy said the decision was a "no brainer". In a statement, Horgan said that "everyone who got involved in this film had no intention of doing a COVID drama but then we read Dennis' script and changed our minds".

The film was directed by Stephen Daldry and Justin Martin. In an interview, Kelly said that he originally wrote the screenplay for a theatrical release but was encouraged by Stephen Daldry and producer Sonia Friedman to make it for television. On challenges that appeared while writing, he said that he "wrote it from a very personal viewpoint" based around his experiences during the pandemic. In writing about those experiences, he said:

I don't see things when I write but I hear voices really clearly in my head. So, it was about just following them and where they go. I should say very quickly that I'm not in a relationship like the one in Together and I live with someone and she's great, she is a real laugh. But even still there were difficult times during lockdown, and it was a stressful thing. I think you draw on your own experiences but you're also drawing on other people.

The character of Artie was originally never going to appear in the film and according to Kelly, the first draft of the script was completed between April and May 2020 and was rewritten several times to create a connection between the characters and the viewer. Principal photography for Together took place for ten days during the pandemic, from 21 April to 5 May 2021, in Kensal Rise, London. As the entire feature takes place in a single setting, filming was quickly completed under COVID-19 protocols in one house, with Horgan describing it as a "beautifully stressful experience". In June 2021, McAvoy said the film does not contain a political message but instead "examines our lives".

== Reception ==
=== Box office ===
As of September 23, 2021, Together has grossed $214,390 worldwide. It was theatrically released in 250 theaters across the United States by Bleecker Street on 27 August 2021. It grossed $102,000 in its opening weekend, consisting of $35,500 on Friday, $37,900 on Saturday, and $28,500 on Sunday, for an average of $408 per theater.

=== Critical response ===
The film was initially broadcast in the United Kingdom on BBC Two on 17 June 2021. On the review aggregator website Rotten Tomatoes, 70% of 76 critics' reviews are positive, with an average rating of 7.1/10. The website's critics consensus reads: "Together is a little too effective at recreating the lockdown experience, although Sharon Horgan and James McAvoy are an appealing duo." On Metacritic, the film has a weighted average score of 57 out of 100 based on 15 critics, indicating "mixed or average reviews".

From The Guardian, Lucy Mangan gave it four stars out of five, writing that while not everyone would enjoy it, Together presented a "miraculous compression" of 2020. In her review, Mangan mentioned her belief that the film was the first to succeed in projecting an honest experience from the living during the COVID-19 pandemic. Furthermore, she described it as a "claustrophobic" viewing, detailing the usage of monologues to dispense information and how it "captures perfectly the emotional dilapidations of a dying relationship".

Writing for The Irish Times, Ed Power gave positive remarks to Sharon Horgan's performance but found the fourth wall breaks "discommoding" to the viewer. In their final comments, Power wrote that the finale was "a vaguely happy conclusion – but, more importantly, an honest one". Meanwhile, Radio Times's Flora Carr described the film as "savagely funny" and "completely devastating". Comparing it to Staged, Carr lauded Together for being able to address serious issues related to the COVID-19 pandemic in a "brave and brilliant" manner. Similarly, Emily Maddick from Glamour summarized the film by writing that it would "leave you laughing, sobbing and furious". On the fourth wall breaks, Maddick wrote that they would "[make] the viewer feel like they are the mediator in the heated venom-filled arguments as opposed to flies on the wall."

Rachel Cooke, writing for New Statesman, gave a negative review and found it was a "cheap and obvious pandemic piggybacking" film she described as "tedious and excruciating". Writing for The Independent, Ed Cumming gave it four stars out of five, describing it as an "unflinching domestic lockdown drama". Additionally, Cumming wrote that "sometimes Together is very funny. I expect many viewers will relate to its vision of the realities of life in lockdown. Its depiction of the gap between the irrepressible people we heard about, who spent the time taking up new hobbies, and the rest of us, who were just trying to limp across each day, is spot on." On the major theme of the film, he found that it was about responding to new struggles: "When it comes to the past 18 months, the right response has rarely been clear."

=== Accolades ===
At the 2022 British Academy Television Awards, the film won the award for Best Single Drama.
