= The Audience (2013 play) =

Play written by Peter Morgan

- Original language: English
- Written by: Peter Morgan
- Setting: Buckingham Palace Balmoral Castle

Premiere
- Date: 15 February 2013
- Place: Gielgud Theatre, London

The Audience is a play by the British playwright and screenwriter Peter Morgan. The play centres on weekly meetings, called audiences, between Queen Elizabeth II (originally played by Helen Mirren) and her prime ministers. The original West End production premiered at the Gielgud Theatre in 2013. It opened on Broadway in 2015, also starring Mirren. A West End revival played in London in 2015 starring Kristin Scott Thomas in the lead role.

== Overview ==
The Audience is centred on the weekly audiences given by Queen Elizabeth II to prime ministers from her accession in 1952 until her death. Three Prime Ministers are omitted from the play: Harold Macmillan, Alec Douglas-Home and Edward Heath are not featured. Tony Blair originally did not feature in the play, but was added when the play transferred to Broadway, replacing James Callaghan, who was excluded from subsequent productions. Advice regarding the political and historical content of the weekly audiences was provided by Professor Vernon Bogdanor (Emeritus Professor of Government at Oxford University), the former tutor of David Cameron, Prime Minister from 2010 until 2016. The play takes place in the Queen's audience room at Buckingham Palace.

== Production history ==
=== West End (2013) ===
The Audience is written by British playwright and screenwriter Peter Morgan. Its premiere production opened in the West End at the Gielgud Theatre on 15 February 2013, with its press night on 5 March. The play featured Helen Mirren as Queen Elizabeth II; the actress had played the same role in the 2006 film The Queen, which was also written by Morgan. The play was directed by Stephen Daldry, with costume design by Bob Crowley, lighting design by Rick Fisher, sound by Paul Arditti, music by Paul Englishby and video design by Ian William Galloway. A typical West End performance ran two hours and 30 minutes, including one interval.

Following the death of former prime minister Margaret Thatcher, who is featured during the play's run, Morgan made a speech to the audience to mark her death. Subsequently, a reference to the late prime minister's death and the Queen's attendance at her funeral was added as a part of the Queen's dialogue with David Cameron. The production was broadcast live to cinemas as part of National Theatre Live on 13 June 2013. The initial broadcast broke the record for most people watching a production live since the scheme began, with nearly 80,000 people watching in the UK and 30,000 people in North America. Further encore screenings were later broadcast.

=== Broadway (2015) ===
The play began a limited Broadway engagement from 8 March to 28 June 2015, at the Gerald Schoenfeld Theatre, with previews from 14 February 2015. Helen Mirren reprised her role of Queen Elizabeth II in this production, alongside fellow original cast members Geoffrey Beevers, Michael Elwyn, Richard McCabe and Rufus Wright.

=== West End Revival (2015) ===
A West End revival began at the Apollo Theatre, opening on 5 May 2015, following previews from 21 April 2015, with Dame Kristin Scott Thomas as Queen Elizabeth II. For the 2015 production, the role of James Callaghan was removed to allow them to feature former prime minister Tony Blair, and the script was updated pending a general election. Following the election on 7 May 2015, the scene featuring David Cameron meeting the Queen was updated to show Cameron had won a second term and showed the Queen asking him to form a government. The audience between Cameron and the Queen was changed several times over the 15-week run in the West End to keep up to date with current political events. After the general election results, references were made to Nicola Sturgeon and the success of the Scottish National Party winning seats from the Labour Party. Other current events references made during the audience scene between the Queen and Cameron included the corruption scandal at FIFA and the Greek bailout debate known as "Grexit". During the last week of the run, a reference was made to newspaper articles displaying the Queen apparently making a Nazi salute in her youth and to the birthday of Prince George.

=== Moscow (2017) ===
In May 2017, the play received its Russian premiere in Moscow and starred Inna Churikova as the Queen, along with Mikhail Gorevoy as Winston Churchill and Galina Tunina as Margaret Thatcher.

=== Toronto (2017) ===
Fiona Reid assumed the role of the Queen in the 2017 Mirvish Productions mounting of the play at Toronto's Royal Alexandra Theatre. The Toronto cast included Paul Essiembre as Eden, Kate Hennig as Thatcher, Benedict Campbell as Brown, Kevin Klassen as Blair and Ben Carlson as Cameron.

== In popular culture ==
The 'Traviata' model handbag by British designer Launer London received a surge in popularity and was subsequently re-issued by the brand following the use of one as a prop in The Audience both in the West End and on Broadway. It is the style often used by Queen Elizabeth II.

Specific episodes of the Netflix series The Crown, created by Peter Morgan, acknowledge inspiration from The Audience, produced by Playful productions LLP, Robert Fox LTD and Andy Harries. The play is cited in the credits of the first, fifth and eighth episodes of season 1, the third and eighth episodes of season 2, the second and ninth episode of season 3, and the second, fifth and tenth episode of season 4.

== Principal roles and original cast ==
Character	West End (2013)	Broadway (2015)	West End revival (2015)
Elizabeth II	Helen Mirren	Helen Mirren	Kristin Scott Thomas
John Major	Paul Ritter	Dylan Baker	Michael Gould
Gordon Brown	Nathaniel Parker	Rod McLachlan	Gordon Kennedy
Harold Wilson	Richard McCabe	Richard McCabe	Nicholas Woodeson
Winston Churchill	Edward Fox	Dakin Matthews	David Calder
Anthony Eden	Michael Elwyn	Michael Elwyn	David Robb
Margaret Thatcher	Haydn Gwynne	Judith Ivey	Sylvestra Le Touzel
David Cameron	Rufus Wright	Rufus Wright	Mark Dexter
Tony Blair	—N/a	Rufus Wright	Mark Dexter
James Callaghan	David Peart	Tony Ward	—N/a
Equerry	Geoffrey Beevers	Geoffrey Beevers	David Peart
Young Elizabeth	Bebe Cave; Maya Gerber; Nell Williams	Sadie Sink; Elizabeth Teeter	Marnie Brighton; Madeleine Jackson-Smith; Izzy Meikle-Small
Bobo MacDonald	Charlotte Moore	Tracy Sallows	Charlotte Moore

Notes

- Robert Hardy withdrew from the role of Churchill before press night in the original West End production for health reasons.

== Awards and honours ==
=== Original West End Production ===
Year	Award Ceremony	Category	Nominee	Result
2013	Evening Standard Awards	Best Play		Nominated
2013	Evening Standard Awards	Best Actress	Helen Mirren	Won
2013	Evening Standard Awards	Best Director	Stephen Daldry	Nominated
2013	Laurence Olivier Awards	Best New Play		Nominated
2013	Laurence Olivier Awards	Best Actress	Helen Mirren	Won
2013	Laurence Olivier Awards	Best Actor in a Supporting Role	Richard McCabe	Won
2013	Laurence Olivier Awards	Best Director	Stephen Daldry	Nominated
2013	Laurence Olivier Awards	Best Costume Design	Bob Crowley	Nominated

=== Original Broadway Production ===
Year	Award Ceremony	Category	Nominee	Result
2015	Tony Award	Best Actress in a Play	Helen Mirren	Won
2015	Tony Award	Best Featured Actor in a Play	Richard McCabe	Won
2015	Tony Award	Best Costume Design of a Play	Bob Crowley	Nominated
2015	Drama Desk Award	Outstanding Actress in a Play	Helen Mirren	Won
2015	Drama Desk Award	Outstanding Costume Design	Bob Crowley	Nominated
2015	Outer Critics Circle Award	Outstanding New Broadway Play		Nominated
2015	Outer Critics Circle Award	Outstanding Actress in a Play	Helen Mirren	Won
2015	Outer Critics Circle Award	Outstanding Featured Actor in a Play	Richard McCabe	Won
2015	Outer Critics Circle Award	Outstanding Director of a Play	Stephen Daldry	Nominated
2015	Outer Critics Circle Award	Outstanding Costume Design	Bob Crowley	Nominated
2015	Outer Critics Circle Award	Outstanding Lighting Design	Rick Fisher	Nominated
2015	Drama League Award	Distinguished Production of a Play		Nominated
2015	Drama League Award	Distinguished Performance	Helen Mirren	Nominated
2015	Drama League Award	Distinguished Performance	Richard McCabe	Nominated
