= Baby kissing =

Political campaigning practice

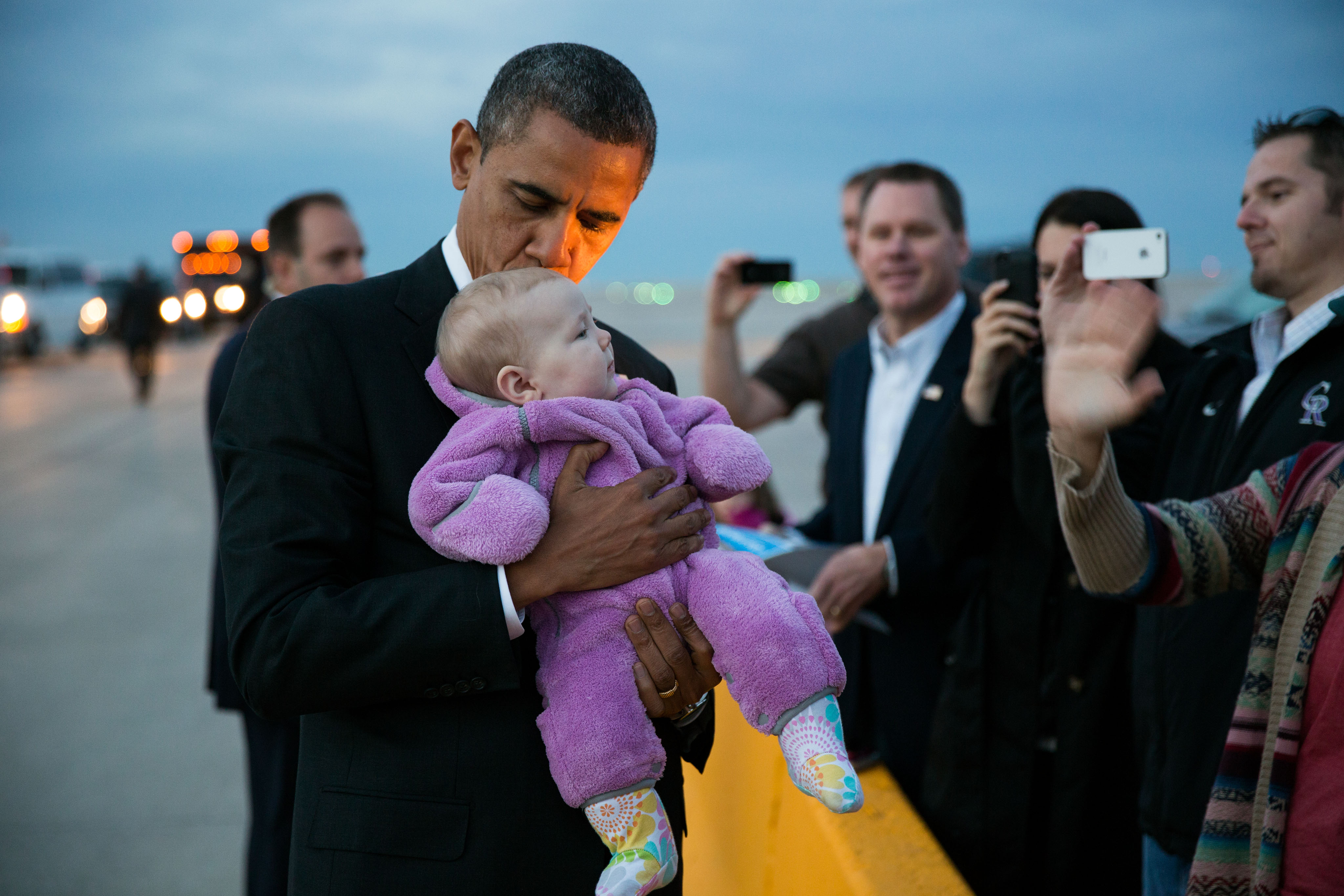
United States president Barack Obama kissing a baby in 2012

Baby kissing is a practice in which politicians and candidates campaigning for office kiss babies in order to garner public support. It is commonly done along with shaking hands.

== History ==
The practice appears to have originated in the United States during the era of Jacksonian democracy, along with other techniques such as "banners, badges, parades, barbecues, [and] free drinks", which were used to get out the vote. An 1888 issue of The Cosmopolitan featured a story about President Andrew Jackson, in which Jackson, touring the Eastern United States in 1833, presented a baby to U.S. Secretary of War John Eaton to kiss. In 1886, the magazine Babyhood reported that most presidents of the United States had accepted "kissing babies as an official duty". In the 1890s, Elizabeth Cady Stanton criticized the practice on the basis of hygiene and children's rights, and praised President Benjamin Harrison for refraining from it.

== Purpose and significance ==
The journalist Elinor Burkett argues that the practice "is designed to suggest that the candidate is stable and trustworthy". The practice may be especially strongly associated with efforts to win women's votes and support: during the 1920 United States presidential election, The Nation reported that James M. Cox's ability "to kiss other people’s babies as if he enjoyed it" rendered him "well-nigh invulnerable with women voters"; while David Shears, a British observer of American politics writing in 1961, concluded: "I suppose baby-kissing is meant to appeal to the women's vote. But every woman knows it's pretty hard to kiss a baby unless you’re holding it, and it's quite risky enough holding your own baby, let alone somebody else's."
