= 76th Tony Awards =

2023 US theatrical awards ceremony

- Promotional poster
- Date: June 11, 2023
- Venue: United Palace
- Hosted by: Ariana DeBose; Skylar Astin and Julianne Hough (preshow)

Highlights
- Most wins: Kimberly Akimbo (5)
- Most nominations: Some Like It Hot (13)
- Website: tonyawards.com

Television/radio coverage
- Network: CBS; Pluto TV
- Viewership: 4.3 million
- Produced by: Ricky Kirshner; Glenn Weiss
- Directed by: Glenn Weiss

The 76th Tony Awards recognized the achievements in Broadway productions during the 2022–23 season. The ceremony was held at the United Palace in New York City on June 11, 2023. Ariana DeBose served as the host for the second year in a row, with Skylar Astin and Julianne Hough co-hosting a pre-show on Pluto TV prior to the main telecast on CBS.

The most-awarded production of this season was new musical Kimberly Akimbo, which won five awards, including Best Musical. Leopoldstadt was the most-awarded play, winning four awards, including Best Play. Some Like It Hot led the nominations, at 13. With J. Harrison Ghee and Alex Newell winning awards for their performances on Some Like It Hot and Shucked, respectively, they became the first openly non-binary performers to win a Tony.

The ceremony was held amid the 2023 Writers Guild of America strike; while the guilds denied a waiver to the Tony Awards' organizers, they agreed to not picket the venue, and no scripted materials were included in the ceremony.

== Ceremony information ==
In January 2023, The Broadway League and American Theatre Wing renewed its contract with Ricky Kirshner and Glenn Weiss's White Cherry Entertainment to produce the ceremony. On April 12, 2023, it was announced that Ariana DeBose would return as host for a second consecutive year. On April 25, 2023, it was announced that the pre-show The Tony Awards: Act One would move from Paramount+ to its sister free ad-supported streaming television (FAST) service Pluto TV, prior to the main presentation on CBS and streaming on Paramount+.

Nominees were announced on May 2, 2023; the musical Some Like It Hot was the most-nominated show of the season, while A Doll's House, Ain't No Mo', and Leopoldstadt were tied for most nominated play.

== Impact of the 2023 Writers Guild of America strike ==
“I'm live and unscripted. You're welcome. So to anyone who may have thought that last year was a bit unhinged, to them, I say, ‘Darlings, buckle up.’”
—76th Tony Awards host Ariana DeBose during her opening monologue

On May 2, 2023, the Writers Guild of America (WGA) went on strike against the Alliance of Motion Picture and Television Producers. On May 12, the WGA denied the American Theatre Wing's request for a waiver to allow the CBS telecast, thereby placing the ceremony's broadcast in uncertainty. (CBS, along with the other major broadcast networks, are represented by the AMPTP in collective bargaining.) The Tony Awards Management Committee held an emergency meeting on May 15 to discuss the future of the ceremony. The meeting, however, was unproductive, with sources saying the committee would make another effort to convince the WGA for a strike waiver. The options were to either hold a non-televised press conference on the original date—akin to the response of the 65th Golden Globe Awards to the 2007–08 WGA strike—or to postpone the ceremony until the strike is resolved—similar to the 74th Tony Awards, which were postponed by more than a year due to the COVID-19 pandemic. The same day as the emergency meeting, the WGA still once again denied the waiver but announced they would not picket the event, and the broadcast was set to continue as planned.

The Tonys ceremony ultimately went on unscripted. Before the show began, host Ariana DeBose revealed to the audience the only words that would appear on the teleprompter that night: "Please wrap up" (the advisory to award winners to close their acceptance speech). The broadcast's opening performance number began with DeBose paging through a script of blank pages before launching into a dance number that was backed by music but free of lyrics. Lin-Manuel Miranda initially wrote an opening number for the awards, but it was not performed because of the strike.

== Eligibility ==
The Tony Awards eligibility cut-off date for the 2022–23 season was April 27, 2023, for all Broadway productions which meet all other eligibility requirements.

Original plays

- Ain't No Mo'
- Between Riverside and Crazy
- A Christmas Carol
- The Collaboration
- Cost of Living
- Fat Ham
- Good Night, Oscar
- The Kite Runner
- Leopoldstadt
- Life of Pi
- Mike Birbiglia: The Old Man and the Pool
- Peter Pan Goes Wrong
- Pictures from Home
- Prima Facie
- Summer, 1976
- The Thanksgiving Play
- Walking with Ghosts

Original musicals

- & Juliet
- Almost Famous
- Bad Cinderella
- A Beautiful Noise
- Kimberly Akimbo
- KPOP
- New York, New York
- Shucked
- Some Like It Hot

Play revivals

- A Doll's House
- Death of a Salesman
- Ohio State Murders
- The Piano Lesson
- The Sign in Sidney Brustein's Window
- Topdog/Underdog

Musical revivals

- 1776
- Camelot
- Dancin'
- Into the Woods
- Parade
- Sweeney Todd: The Demon Barber of Fleet Street

== Winners and nominees ==
The nominees for the 76th Tony Awards were announced on May 2, 2023 by Lea Michele and Myles Frost. The year's nominations included several non-binary performers, with J. Harrison Ghee (for Some Like It Hot) and Alex Newell (for Shucked) becoming the first two non-binary performers to be nominated for performances in the same year and ultimately winning in their respective categories, while others, such as Justin David Sullivan (from & Juliet), opted out of Tony consideration due to their gendered categories, urging awards shows to "expand their reach". On their nomination for Best Performance by a Featured Actor in a Musical, Newell noted the genderless nature of the term "actor", hence their decision to be included for Tony consideration.

The musical Some Like It Hot led the nominations, with 13 nominations, while Ain't No Mo' and Leopoldstadt tied for the most nominations for a play, each receiving six.

=== Competitive awards ===
Winners for each award are listed first and highlighted in boldface type.

Best Play ‡	Best Musical ‡
**Leopoldstadt**; Ain't No Mo'; Between Riverside and Crazy; Cost of Living; Fat Ham	**Kimberly Akimbo**; & Juliet; New York, New York; Shucked; Some Like It Hot
Best Revival of a Play ‡	Best Revival of a Musical ‡
**Topdog/Underdog**; A Doll's House; The Piano Lesson; The Sign in Sidney Brustein's Window	**Parade**; Camelot; Into the Woods; Sweeney Todd: The Demon Barber of Fleet Street
Best Performance by a Leading Actor in a Play	Best Performance by a Leading Actress in a Play
**Sean Hayes – Good Night, Oscar as Oscar Levant**; Yahya Abdul-Mateen II – Topdog/Underdog as Booth; Corey Hawkins – Topdog/Underdog as Lincoln; Stephen McKinley Henderson – Between Riverside and Crazy as Pops; Wendell Pierce – Death of a Salesman as Willy Loman	**Jodie Comer – Prima Facie as Tessa Ensler**; Jessica Chastain – A Doll's House as Nora Helmer; Jessica Hecht – Summer, 1976 as Alice; Audra McDonald – Ohio State Murders as Suzanne Alexander
Best Performance by a Leading Actor in a Musical	Best Performance by a Leading Actress in a Musical
**J. Harrison Ghee – Some Like It Hot as Jerry/Daphne**; Christian Borle – Some Like It Hot as Joe/Josephine; Josh Groban – Sweeney Todd: The Demon Barber of Fleet Street as Sweeney Todd; Brian d'Arcy James – Into the Woods as The Baker; Ben Platt – Parade as Leo Frank; Colton Ryan – New York, New York as Jimmy Doyle	**Victoria Clark – Kimberly Akimbo as Kimberly Levaco**; Annaleigh Ashford – Sweeney Todd: The Demon Barber of Fleet Street as Mrs. Nellie Lovett; Sara Bareilles – Into the Woods as The Baker's Wife; Lorna Courtney – & Juliet as Juliet Capulet; Micaela Diamond – Parade as Lucille Frank
Best Performance by a Featured Actor in a Play	Best Performance by a Featured Actress in a Play
**Brandon Uranowitz – Leopoldstadt as Ludwig Jakobovicz/Nathan Fischbein**; Jordan E. Cooper – Ain't No Mo' as Peaches; Samuel L. Jackson – The Piano Lesson as Doaker Charles; Arian Moayed – A Doll's House as Torvald Helmer; David Zayas – Cost of Living as Eddie	**Miriam Silverman – The Sign in Sidney Brustein's Window as Mavis Parodus Bryson**; Katy Sullivan – Cost of Living as Ani; Kara Young – Cost of Living as Jess; Nikki Crawford – Fat Ham as Tedra; Crystal Lucas-Perry – Ain't No Mo' as Passenger #5
Best Performance by a Featured Actor in a Musical	Best Performance by a Featured Actress in a Musical
**Alex Newell – Shucked as Lulu**; Kevin Cahoon – Shucked as Peanut; Justin Cooley – Kimberly Akimbo as Seth Weetis; Kevin Del Aguila – Some Like It Hot as Osgood Fielding III; Jordan Donica – Camelot as Sir Lancelot du Lac	**Bonnie Milligan – Kimberly Akimbo as Aunt Debra**; Julia Lester – Into the Woods as Little Red Riding Hood; Ruthie Ann Miles – Sweeney Todd: The Demon Barber of Fleet Street as The Beggar Woman; NaTasha Yvette Williams – Some Like It Hot as Sweet Sue; Betsy Wolfe – & Juliet as Anne Hathaway/April
Best Direction of a Play	Best Direction of a Musical
**Patrick Marber – Leopoldstadt**; Saheem Ali – Fat Ham; Jo Bonney – Cost of Living; Jamie Lloyd – A Doll's House; Stevie Walker-Webb – Ain't No Mo'; Max Webster – Life of Pi	**Michael Arden – Parade**; Lear deBessonet – Into the Woods; Casey Nicholaw – Some Like it Hot; Jack O'Brien – Shucked; Jessica Stone – Kimberly Akimbo
Best Book of a Musical	Best Original Score (Music and/or Lyrics) Written for the Theatre
**Kimberly Akimbo – David Lindsay-Abaire**; & Juliet – David West Read; New York, New York – David Thompson and Sharon Washington; Shucked – Robert Horn; Some Like It Hot – Matthew López and Amber Ruffin	**Kimberly Akimbo – Jeanine Tesori (music) and David Lindsay-Abaire (lyrics)**; Almost Famous – Tom Kitt (music and lyrics) and Cameron Crowe (lyrics); KPOP – Helen Park and Max Vernon (music and lyrics); Shucked – Brandy Clark and Shane McAnally (music and lyrics); Some Like It Hot – Marc Shaiman (music and lyrics) and Scott Wittman (lyrics)
Best Scenic Design of a Play	Best Scenic Design of a Musical
**Andrzej Goulding and Tim Hatley – Life of Pi**; Miriam Buether – Prima Facie; Rachel Hauck – Good Night, Oscar; Richard Hudson – Leopoldstadt; Dane Laffrey and Lucy Mackinnon – A Christmas Carol	**Beowulf Boritt – New York, New York**; Mimi Lien – Sweeney Todd: The Demon Barber of Fleet Street; Michael Yeargan and 59 Productions – Camelot; Scott Pask – Shucked; Scott Pask – Some Like It Hot
Best Costume Design of a Play	Best Costume Design of a Musical
**Brigitte Reiffenstuel – Leopoldstadt**; Nick Barnes, Finn Caldwell, and Tim Hatley – Life of Pi; Dominique Fawn Hill – Fat Ham; Emilio Sosa – Ain't No Mo'; Emilio Sosa – Good Night, Oscar	**Gregg Barnes – Some Like It Hot**; Sophia Choi and Clint Ramos – KPOP; Susan Hilferty – Parade; Jennifer Moeller – Camelot; Paloma Young – & Juliet; Donna Zakowska – New York, New York
Best Lighting Design of a Play	Best Lighting Design of a Musical
**Tim Lutkin – Life of Pi**; Neil Austin – Leopoldstadt; Natasha Chivers – Prima Facie; Jon Clark – A Doll's House; Bradley King – Fat Ham; Jen Schriever – Death of a Salesman; Ben Stanton – A Christmas Carol	**Natasha Katz – Sweeney Todd: The Demon Barber of Fleet Street**; Ken Billington – New York, New York; Lap Chi Chu – Camelot; Heather Gilbert – Parade; Howard Hudson – & Juliet; Natasha Katz – Some Like It Hot
Best Sound Design of a Play	Best Sound Design of a Musical
**Carolyn Downing – Life of Pi**; Jonathan Deans and Taylor Williams – Ain't No Mo'; Joshua D. Reid – A Christmas Carol; Ben Ringham and Max Ringham – A Doll's House; Ben Ringham and Max Ringham – Prima Facie	**Nevin Steinberg – Sweeney Todd: The Demon Barber of Fleet Street**; Kai Harada – New York, New York; Scott Lehrer and Alex Neumann – Into the Woods; Gareth Owen – & Juliet; John Shivers – Shucked
Best Choreography	Best Orchestrations
**Casey Nicholaw – Some Like It Hot**; Steven Hoggett – Sweeney Todd: The Demon Barber of Fleet Street; Susan Stroman – New York, New York; Jennifer Weber – & Juliet; Jennifer Weber – KPOP	**Bryan Carter and Charlie Rosen – Some Like It Hot**; John Clancy – Kimberly Akimbo; Sam Davis and Daryl Waters – New York, New York; Dominic Fallacaro and Bill Sherman – & Juliet; Jason Howland – Shucked

‡ The award is presented to the producer(s) of the musical or play.

=== Non-competitive awards ===
Names	Accolade
Jerry Mitchell	Isabelle Stevenson Award
Jason Zembuch Young from South Plantation High School	Excellence in Theatre Education Award
Joel Grey	Special Tony Award for Lifetime Achievement
John Kander	Special Tony Award for Lifetime Achievement
Pasadena Playhouse	Regional Theatre Tony Award

== Multiple nominations and awards ==
=== Productions with multiple nominations and awards ===
Nominations	Awards	Production
13	4	Some Like It Hot
9	0	& Juliet
9	0	New York, New York
9	0	Shucked
8	5	Kimberly Akimbo
8	2	Sweeney Todd: The Demon Barber of Fleet Street
6	0	Ain't No Mo'
6	0	A Doll's House
6	0	Into the Woods
6	4	Leopoldstadt
6	2	Parade
5	0	Camelot
5	0	Cost of Living
5	0	Fat Ham
5	3	Life of Pi
4	0	Prima Facie
3	0	A Christmas Carol
3	0	Good Night, Oscar
3	0	KPOP
3	0	Topdog/Underdog
2	0	Between Riverside and Crazy
2	0	Death of a Salesman
2	0	The Piano Lesson
2	0	The Sign in Sidney Brustein's Window

=== Individuals with multiple nominations and awards ===
Nominations	Awards	Individual
2	0	Jordan E. Cooper
2	1	Natasha Katz
2	2	LaChanze
2	2	David Lindsay-Abaire
2	1	Casey Nicholaw
2	0	Scott Pask
2	0	Ben Ringham
2	0	Max Ringham
2	0	Emilio Sosa
2	0	Jennifer Weber

== Presenters and performers ==
Act One:

Presenters
Names	Notes
Kelly Coffey, CEO of City National Bank	presented Regional Theatre Tony Award to Pasadena Playhouse
Lin-Manuel Miranda	presented Special Tony Award to John Kander
Denée Benton	presented Excellence in Theatre Education Award
Annaleigh Ashford	presented Isabelle Stevenson Award to Jerry Mitchell
Jennifer Grey	presented Special Tony Award to Joel Grey

Main Show:

Presenters
Names	Notes
Dominique Fishback and Lily Rabe	presented Best Featured Actor in a Play
Wayne Brady and Marcel Spears	presented Best Featured Actress in a Musical
Lupita Nyong'o	presented Best Direction of a Play
Colman Domingo and Lea Michele	presented Best Direction of a Musical
David Henry Hwang and Kenny Leon	presented Best Featured Actress in a Play
Uzo Aduba and Common	presented Best Revival of a Play
Tatiana Maslany and Wilson Cruz	presented Best Featured Actor in a Musical
Denée Benton	presented Excellence in Theatre Education Award
Julianne Hough and Skylar Astin	presented Best Book of a Musical
Kelli O'Hara	presented Best Revival of a Musical
Stephanie Hsu and Luke Evans	presented Best Actor in a Musical
Marcia Gay Harden and Utkarsh Ambudkar	presented Best Actress in a Play
LaTanya Richardson Jackson and Samuel L. Jackson	presented Best Play
Barry Manilow and Melissa Etheridge	presented Best Actress in a Musical
Matthew Broderick and Nathan Lane	presented Best Actor in a Play
Ariana DeBose	presented Best Musical

Performances

The following shows and performers performed on the ceremony's telecast:

Performers
Names	Song
New York, New York	"Cheering for Me Now" / "Theme from New York, New York"
Camelot	"C'est Moi" / "The Lusty Month of May" / "If Ever I Would Leave You" / "Camelot (Reprise)"
& Juliet	"Roar"
Some Like It Hot	"Some Like It Hot"
Into the Woods	"It Takes Two"
Ariana DeBose and Julianne Hough	"Hot Honey Rag"
Parade	"This Is Not Over Yet"
Sweeney Todd: The Demon Barber of Fleet Street	"The Ballad of Sweeney Todd"
A Beautiful Noise	"Sweet Caroline"
Joaquina Kalukango	"Wishing You Were Here Somehow Here Again" (In Memoriam)
Kimberly Akimbo	"Anagram"
Shucked	"Corn" / "Independently Owned" / "Somebody Will" / "Woman of the World"
Funny Girl	"Don't Rain On My Parade" –

== Reception ==
=== Critical reception ===
Many reviewers gave praise to the event for its ability to persist and make an entertaining show in spite of the fallout from the WGA strike. Neal Justin of the Star Tribune gave praise to DeBose's performance in the show and also added that "theater lovers may no longer be able to see that chandelier drop at the Majestic Theater in New York, but the Tonys ceremony on Sunday evening proved there was still plenty of reasons for viewers to make the trip East." Charles McNulty of the Los Angeles Times applauded the recognition to writers made throughout the event and stated that without pre-written scripts, "theater people were allowed to be theater people." McNulty also gave praise to the event for its social justice messaging. Writing for The Washington Post, Peter Marks described the show as "akin to a kitchen accidentally creating a great dish by leaving out a classic ingredient," and echoed similar statements by McNulty, adding that the show demonstrated to actors, audiences, and writers to "let theater be theater." Daniel Fienberg of The Hollywood Reporter described the show as a much-needed victory for Broadway theater.

Though the show was generally praised, some criticized the unscripted show; Johnny Oleksinski of the New York Post dismissed the unscripted joint as "sleepy," and "cringeworthy," adding that the show lacked any of the typical banter and skits due to lack of written lines. Matthew Huff of Parade, though generally complimentary of the show, criticized the awkward transitions that resulted from going unscripted.

=== Audience reaction and ratings ===
During the airing of the event, viewers on Paramount+ complained that instead of seeing the 76th Tony Awards, they instead were shown footage of the previous years' Tony Awards. It was later revealed that this was due to confusion over Paramount+ subscription levels; the 76th Tony Awards were only available to premium users, leaving those who weren't only with the 75th. The distinction was not made in any of the Tony Awards' press release, resulting in viewers and news outlets being unaware of that the 2023 version was a premium only service. Further confusion ensued as DeBose hosted both the 2022 and 2023 events.

The 76th Tony Awards accumulated 4.3 million viewers, earning it the title as the most viewed Tony Awards since 2019. According to CBS, based on data from Paramount+, the show was also the most live streamed show ever, with a 13% streaming increase compared to 2022. Act one became the most watched live event in Pluto TV's history. The increase was notable in a time when general viewership for live U.S. television events has been declining while the Super Bowl, Oscars and Grammys were streaking in annual ratings rebound since the previous year. While the 76th Tony Awards was the third least viewed Tony Awards show since records began, it is so far the largest viewership for the Tony Awards since its switch to live coast-to-coast U.S. telecasts the year prior, and marked the first time the Tony Awards experienced consecutive years of ratings increase since the 63rd Tony Awards in 2009.

== In Memoriam ==
Joaquina Kalukango performed "Wishing You Were Here Somehow Here Again" from the musical The Phantom of the Opera.

- Harry Belafonte
- Peggy Hickey
- Julie Hughes
- Mary Alice
- Eugene Lee
- Chase Mishkin
- Barry Humphries
- Lucy Simon
- Michael Feingold
- Robert LuPone
- Susan L. Schulman
- Chaim Topol
- Douglas McGrath
- Adrian Hall
- Everett Quinton
- James Rado
- Howie Jones
- Pat Carroll
- Robin Wager
- Peter Brook
- Steve Fickinger
- Charles Kimbrough
- Mario Fratti
- Melinda Dillon
- Max Woodward
- Perry Cline
- Michael Callan
- Seymour "Red" Press
- Marva Hicks
- Robert Kalfin
- Larry Storch
- Cynthia Weil
- Burt Bacharach
- Todd Haimes
- Frank Galati
- Edward Payson Call
- Ben Lipitz
- Don Sebesky
- Barbara Bryne
- Carole Cook
- Raquel Welch
- Paul Sorvino
- Tina Turner
- Angela Lansbury

== See also ==
- 2023 Laurence Olivier Awards
- Drama Desk Awards
- Obie Awards
- New York Drama Critics' Circle
- Theatre World Awards
- Lucille Lortel Awards
