= Drama Desk Award for Outstanding Sound Design of a Musical =

American theatre award

- Awarded for: Outstanding Sound Design of a Musical
- Location: New York City
- Country: United States
- Presented by: Drama Desk
- First award: 2010
- Currently held by: Mikhail Fiksel, Mexodus (2026)
- Website: dramadesk.org (defunct)

The Drama Desk Award for Outstanding Sound Design of a Musical is an annual award presented by Drama Desk in recognition of achievements in theatre across collective Broadway, off-Broadway and off-off-Broadway productions in New York City.

The award was established in 1980, with the Drama Desk Award for Outstanding Sound Design being presented each year to any play or musical production. Starting in 2010, the singular award was replaced by separate play and musical categories.

Acme Sound Partners, Brian Ronan, Scott Lehrer and Nevin Steinberg hold the record for the most wins in the category, with two each. Ronan also holds the record for most nominations, with ten, followed by Lehrer with nine and Kai Harada with six.

== Winners and nominees ==
Key

and bold indicates the winner.

=== 2010s ===
Year	Designer	Production	Ref.
2010
2010	**Acme Sound Partners**	**Ragtime**	
2010	Jonathan Deans	La Cage aux Folles	
2010	Kurt Eric Fischer, Ashley Hanson and Brian Ronan	Everyday Rapture	
2010	Peter Hylenski	The Scottsboro Boys	
2010	Scott Lehrer	Finian's Rainbow	
2010	Brian Ronan	Promises, Promises	
2011
2011	**Brian Ronan**	**Anything Goes**	
2011	Lindsay Jones	The Burnt Part Boys	
2011	Michael Rasbury	Hello Again	
2011	Brian Ronan	The Book of Mormon	
2011	Jon Weston	In Transit	
2012
2012	**Acme Sound Partners**	**Porgy and Bess**	
2012	Jonathan Deans	Carrie	
2012	Clive Goodwin	Once	
2012	Kai Harada	Follies	
2012	Steve Canyon Kennedy	Jesus Christ Superstar	
2012	Jon Weston	Death Takes a Holiday	
2013
2013	**Steve Canyon Kennedy**	**Hands on a Hardbody**	
2013	**Scott Lehrer and Drew Levy**	**Chaplin: The Musical**	
2013	**Tony Meola**	**The Mystery of Edwin Drood**	
2013	Brian Ronan	Bring It On: The Musical	
2013	Brian Ronan	Giant	
2013	Dan Moses Schreier	Passion	
2014
2014	**Brian Ronan**	**Beautiful: The Carole King Musical**	
2014	Kai Harada	Fun Home	
2014	Peter Hylenski	Bullets Over Broadway	
2014	Peter Hylenski	Rocky the Musical	
2014	Dan Moses Schreier	A Gentleman's Guide to Love and Murder	
2014	Jon Weston	The Bridges of Madison County	
2015
2015	**Nevin Steinberg**	**Hamilton**	
2015	Peter Hylenski	Side Show	
2015	Scott Lehrer	The King and I	
2015	Scott Lehrer and Drew Levy	Honeymoon in Vegas	
2015	Brian Ronan	The Last Ship	
2015	Jon Weston	An American in Paris	
2016
2016	**Dan Moses Schreier**	**American Psycho**	
2016	Mick Potter	School of Rock	
2016	Brian Ronan	Lazarus	
2016	Nevin Steinberg	Bright Star	
2016	Scott Lehrer	Shuffle Along	
2017
2017	**Nicholas Pope**	**Natasha, Pierre & The Great Comet of 1812**	
2017	Simon Baker	946: The Amazing Story of Adolphus Tips	
2017	Peter Hylenski	Anastasia	
2017	Scott Lehrer	Hello, Dolly!	
2017	Mick Potter	Cats	
2017	Brian Ronan	War Paint	
2017	Matt Stine	Sweeney Todd: The Demon Barber of Fleet Street	
2018
2018	**Kai Harada**	**The Band's Visit**	
2018	Scott Lehrer	Carousel	
2018	Will Pickens	KPOP	
2018	Dan Moses Schreier	Pacific Overtures	
2019
2019	**Nevin Steinberg and Jessica Paz**	**Hadestown**	
2019	Simon Baker	Girl from the North Country	
2019	Drew Levy	Rodgers & Hammerstein's Oklahoma!	
2019	Brian Ronan	Tootsie	
2019	Mikaal Sulaiman	Rags Parkland Sings the Songs of the Future	

=== 2020s ===
Year	Designer	Production	Ref.
2020
2020	**Peter Hylenski**	**Moulin Rouge!**	
2020	Tom Gibbons	West Side Story	
2020	Kai Harada	Soft Power	
2020	Hidenori Nakajo	Octet	
2020	Nevin Steinberg	The Wrong Man	
2021	No awards: New York theatres shuttered, March 2020 to September 2021, due to the COVID-19 pandemic in New York City		
2022
2022	**Gareth Owen**	**MJ**	
2022	Ian Dickinson for Autograph	Company	
2022	Paul Gatehouse	Six	
2022	Kai Harada	Kimberly Akimbo	
2023
2023	**Scott Lehrer and Alex Neumann**	**Into the Woods**	
2023	Peter Hylenski	Almost Famous	
2023	John Shivers	Shucked	
2023	Joanna Lynne Staub	Weightless	
2023	Jon Weston	Parade	
2024
2024	**Nick Lidster for Autograph**	**Cabaret at the Kit Kat Club**	
2024	**Cody Spencer**	**The Outsiders**	
2024	**Walter Trarbach**	**Water for Elephants**	
2024	Jason Crystal	Suffs	
2024	Kai Harada and Joshua Millican	Dead Outlaw	
2025
2025	**Peter Hylenski**	**Just in Time**	
2025	Adam Fisher	Sunset Blvd.	
2025	Scott Lehrer	Gypsy	
2025	Mick Potter	Stephen Sondheim's Old Friends	
2025	Dan Moses Schreier	Floyd Collins	
2026
2026	**Mikhail Fiksel**	**Mexodus**	
2026	Jordana Abrenica	Beau the Musical	
2026	Jason Crystal	The Baker's Wife	
2026	Kai Harada	Ragtime	
2026	Alex Hawthorn and Drew Levy	Lights Out: Nat “King” Cole	

== Multiple wins ==
2 wins

- Acme Sound Partners
- Brian Ronan
- Scott Lehrer
- Nevin Steinberg

== Multiple nominations ==
10 nominations

- Brian Ronan

9 nominations

- Scott Lehrer

7 nominations

- Kai Harada

5 nominations

- Jon Weston
- Dan Moses Schreier

4 nominations

- Nevin Steinberg

3 nominations

- Drew Levy
- Mick Potter

2 nominations

- Acme Sound Partners
- Jonathan Deans
- Steve Canyon Kennedy
- Simon Baker

== See also ==
- Laurence Olivier Award for Best Sound Design
- Tony Award for Best Sound Design of a Musical
- Drama Desk Award for Outstanding Sound Design
- Lucille Lortel Award for Outstanding Sound Design
