= Joshua Hyunho Lee =

American entertainer

- Born: San Diego, California, U.S.
- Education: Harvard University (BA)
- Occupations: Actor; dancer; singer
- Years active: 2022–present

Joshua Hyunho Lee is an American actor, dancer, and singer of Korean descent. He is best known for his role as Jintaek "Jin" Lee in the Netflix series XO, Kitty.

== Early life and education ==
Lee was born and raised in San Diego, California, to a Korean American family. He has an older sister. He began dancing as a child, training upwards of 40 hours per week while competing in dance competitions on weekends. He has described growing up living a "double Hannah Montana life," spending weekdays in science classes and weekends traveling for dance competitions. During high school, he performed as a dancer for Hailee Steinfeld and appeared on America's Got Talent.

Lee graduated from Harvard University with a Bachelor of Arts in computer science and economics, with a language citation in Mandarin Chinese. At Harvard, he was active in the dance and a cappella communities, singing with Key Change, a co-ed a cappella group.

After graduating, Lee moved to New York City and worked in venture capital. His parents were initially unaware that he had left his finance career; they later surprised him in New York for his Broadway closing night performance. While employed in finance, he began taking acting classes, and in 2021 he left his corporate career to pursue acting full-time. He has cited the growing prominence of Asian representation in media, including Shōgun, Squid Game, and Everything Everywhere All at Once, as factors that encouraged him to pursue a career in entertainment.

== Career ==
=== Broadway: KPOP (2022) ===
In 2022, Lee originated the role of Timmy X, a rapper in the fictional boy band F8, in the Broadway musical KPOP at the Circle in the Square Theatre. The production, with a book by Jason Kim, music and lyrics by Helen Park and Max Vernon, and choreography by Jennifer Weber, ran from October to December 2022. The cast included former K-pop artists Luna, Min, and Kevin Woo. The musical received three Tony Award nominations in 2023, including Best Original Score and Best Choreography. The original Broadway cast recording was released in May 2023 by Masterworks Broadway.

=== Short films (2023–2024) ===
Lee appeared in several short films, including Sorry You Have to See This (2023) as Nathan, directed by Josh Leong, and The Martyr of Hudson Yards (2023) as Elias, a young Asian American artist in New York City experiencing anxiety attacks. He also appeared in Sins of My Youth (2024) as Nick.

=== Gangnam Project (2024–present) ===
Lee stars as Supreme in Gangnam Project, a youth comedy-drama co-commissioned by CBC Kids and CBBC about a Korean Canadian teenager who travels to Seoul for K-pop training. He has said the role mirrors his own life, noting that "Supreme and I are similar people...we both are our own harshest critics and strive to be the best." The first season premiered on BBC iPlayer and CBBC on February 26, 2024, and on CBC Gem on March 8, 2024. A second season premiered on March 5, 2025. The series became available on Netflix in the United States on January 30, 2026.

=== XO, Kitty (2025–present) ===
In January 2025, Lee joined the cast of the Netflix series XO, Kitty in its second season as Jin, a track star and love interest. His TikTok dancing had caught the attention of the show's producers, who incorporated a dance sequence into his character. The show was filmed in Seoul, where Lee visited his mother's family in Korea for the first time in years. The second season debuted at number one globally on Netflix, ranking first in 70 countries with 14.2 million views in its first week, and holds an 83% approval rating on Rotten Tomatoes. Lee is set to return for the third season, premiering April 2, 2026.

=== Other work ===
In September 2023, Lee performed as a backup dancer for Stray Kids during their performance of "S-Class" at the 2023 MTV Video Music Awards. He has also expressed aspirations in screenwriting, directing, and producing original projects.

== Filmography ==
=== Television ===
Year	Title	Role	Notes
2022	KPOP	Timmy X	Broadway musical
2024	Gangnam Project	Supreme	
2025	XO, Kitty	Jintaek "Jin" Lee	Recurring role (season 2-3)
