= Over the Moon (2020 film) =

2020 animated musical fantasy comedy film

- Official release poster
- Directed by: Glen Keane
- Written by: Audrey Wells
- Produced by: Gennie Rim; Peilin Chou
- Starring: Cathy Ang; Phillipa Soo; Ken Jeong; John Cho; Ruthie Ann Miles; Margaret Cho; Sandra Oh
- Edited by: Edie Ichioka
- Music by: Steven Price (score); Christopher Curtis (songs); Marjorie Duffield (songs); Helen Park (songs)
- Production companies: Netflix Animation Studios; Pearl Studio; Glen Keane Productions
- Distributed by: Netflix
- Release dates: October 17, 2020 (MFF); October 23, 2020 (United States)
- Running time: 100 minutes
- Countries: United States; China
- Language: English
- Box office: $860,000

Over the Moon is a 2020 animated musical fantasy comedy film directed by Glen Keane and co-directed by John Kahrs, from a screenplay by Audrey Wells. The film was produced by Pearl Studio and Netflix Animation, and animated by Sony Pictures Imageworks. It stars the voices of Cathy Ang, Phillipa Soo, Ken Jeong, John Cho, Ruthie Ann Miles, Margaret Cho, and Sandra Oh. The plot follows an adventurous girl named Fei Fei, who builds a rocket ship to meet the mythical goddess on the Moon Chang'e.

Over the Moon was first shown at the Montclair Film Festival on October 17, 2020, followed by its release on Netflix and in select theaters on October 23. The film earned a Golden Globe nomination for Best Animated Feature Film, and was nominated for Best Animated Feature at the 93rd Academy Awards. It is the final film Wells worked on before her death and was dedicated to her memory.

== Plot ==
A girl named Fei Fei is being told the legend of the Moon goddess Chang'e who took a potion for immortality, causing her to become a goddess and ascend to the Moon without her lover Houyi, and waits for him there. In preparation for the annual Moon Festival, Fei Fei, a 5 year old, and her family make mooncakes for the village. However, Fei Fei's mother falls ill, and gives her daughter a white rabbit named Bungee. She passes away when Fei Fei is 7.

Fei Fei, now 11, who still believes in Chang'e four years after her mother’s death, is upset when she learns that her father is engaged to Mrs. Zhong, and is annoyed by her energetic 8 year old son, Chin, who has a pet frog. Fei Fei's family joins them for the Moon Festival celebration, and Mrs. Zhong brings up the topic of Chang'e. When a debate sparks over whether she is real, Fei Fei asks her father to confirm that she is. When he hesitates to answer, a distraught Fei Fei runs up to her room. Inspired by a crane, she decides to build a rocket to the Moon to prove that Chang'e is real. She designs a rocket that resembles a Chinese paper lantern in the shape of a rabbit that uses fireworks to boost her speed. Her rocket almost succeeds until she realizes that Chin snuck aboard her rocket and they begin to crash to Earth. Suddenly, the rocket is captured in a mystical beam of energy and taken to the Moon. They crash-land after being beset by 2 friendly winged guardian lions, who then rescue them and take them to Lunaria.

They are introduced to Chang'e and her backup dancers, the Lunettes. Chang'e tells Fei Fei that she was supposed to deliver a gift for Chang'e to bring Houyi back. Fei Fei takes a photo with Chang'e to prove she is real, but Chang'e takes the photo from Fei Fei and demands the gift. Fei Fei doesn't know what she is talking about, and a frustrated Chang'e announces a competition to find her gift before the last of the moondust falls. Fei Fei gets upset with Chin and leaves him, getting a ride with the Biker Chicks to the crash site. Chin sees some Lunettes with the photo and is captured by Chang'e who demands the location of the gift. Chang'e challenges Chin to a game of ping pong to learn the location of the gift, but Chin wins, further upsetting Chang'e. Chang'e cries in despair that she will never see Houyi again. While Chin is trapped in a chamber by Chang'e, Bungee follows the Jade Rabbit into his workplace. Meanwhile, Fei Fei and the Biker Chicks head to her rocket's crash site, where the former meets an exiled Lunarian named Gobi. She discovers her Chang'e doll, which she suspects to be the gift, but the Biker Chicks snatch the doll and leave Fei Fei and Gobi behind.

Fei Fei and Gobi head to Lunaria on the backs of giant toads, where Gobi reveals that Chang'e exiled him due to a song about moving on. Fei Fei and Gobi catch up to the Biker Chicks, but during their scuffle, the doll is destroyed. However, Fei Fei discovers in one of her mooncakes a broken half of an open jade circle matching one that Chang'e wears around her neck, and realizes that it is Chang'e's gift. They return to Lunaria's palace, rejoin Chin and Bungee, and present the gift to Chang'e, who makes a full jade circle. Chang'e and Houyi are then briefly reunited, but Houyi tells Chang'e to move on before fading away. Refusing to accept this, Chang'e slips into a state of depression, plunging Lunaria into total darkness.

Fei Fei tries to reach out to Chang'e, but the moment she enters Chang'e's state of sadness, she also becomes depressed due to a vision of her mother. Realizing that they both must move on from their tragedies, Chang'e and Fei Fei encourage each other to find the love all around them. This allows the two to accept their loved ones' deaths, restoring light to Lunaria.

Chang'e thanks Fei Fei and allows her and Chin passage back home—excluding Bungee, who stays on the Moon with Jade Rabbit—and lifts Gobi's banishment. Fei Fei and Chin bid farewell to the Lunarians and return home, where Fei Fei accepts her father and Mrs. Zhong's marriage and Chin as her stepbrother. Fei Fei builds up a loving relationship with Mrs. Zhong and her new stepbrother Chin. About a year later, Fei Fei is 12 and living happily with her new family. It is the Moon Festival again, and she sits with her father and looks up at the Moon, watching as cranes fly up towards it in the night.

== Voice cast ==
- Cathy Ang as Fei Fei, a 11-year-old (12 at the end of the film) girl who believes in Chang'e ever since the loss of her mother.
  - Brycen Hall as young Fei Fei.
- Robert G. Chiu as Chin, Mrs. Zhong's 8-year-old son (9 at the end of the film) and Fei Fei's stepbrother.
- Phillipa Soo as Chang'e, the mythical Moon goddess who yearns to be with her true love Houyi again. The outfits worn by Chang'e in the film were designed and created by haute couture Chinese designer Guo Pei.
- Ken Jeong as Gobi, a pangolin Lunarian and former royal advisor who was exiled a thousand years ago.
- John Cho as Ba Ba, Fei Fei's father.
- Ruthie Ann Miles as Ma Ma, Fei Fei's late mother.
- Sandra Oh as Mrs. Zhong, Ba Ba's new fiancée, later wife and Fei Fei's stepmother.
- Margaret Cho as Auntie Ling, one of Fei Fei's aunts.
  - Cho also voices Gretch, one of the Biker Chicks.
- Kimiko Glenn as Auntie Mei, another one of Fei Fei's aunts.
  - Glenn also voices Lulu, one of the Biker Chicks.
- Artt Butler as Uncle, Fei Fei's uncle.
  - Butler also voices Bill, one of the Biker Chicks.
- Irene Tsu as Grandma, Fei Fei's grandma.
- Clem Cheung as Grandpa, Fei Fei's grandpa.
- Conrad Ricamora as Hou Yi, Chang'e's true love.

== Production ==
On September 26, 2017, Pearl Studio (then known as Oriental DreamWorks) hired Audrey Wells to write the script for the film called Over the Moon, which was based on an idea by Janet Yang to retell the classic Chinese myth of Chang'e, a goddess on the Moon, through the story of a young girl who wished to prove her existence. On February 6, 2018, Netflix acquired distribution rights to the film and Glen Keane was set to direct. Audrey Wells died in 2018. The film was dedicated in Audrey Wells' memory.

Janet Yang conceptualized the film's story as a modern retelling of the Chang'e myth, on which Wells based the screenplay; after Wells' death in 2018, additional screenplay material was provided by Alice Wu and Jennifer Yee McDevitt. Keane, a veteran animator from Walt Disney Animation Studios, made his feature directorial debut with Over the Moon, and took a research trip to Shanghai in order to accurately depict Chinese culture for the film. Although initially written as a non-musical, Keane thought of using music to advance the film's story, for which he hired three Broadway musical composers to write Over the Moon's original songs, and midway through production, Keane's former Disney collaborator John Kahrs was recruited as co-director. Staunchly dedicated to the film's production, Keane later stated that "I've never worked on a film that I'm more proud of".

While studios like Walt Disney Pictures and Pixar have become known to use groups of people known as the Braintrust and Story Trust to help with the script, Keane said that "Creative decisions here aren’t made by committee". Steven MacLeod, a storyboad artist for DreamWorks Animation, served as the film's head of story.

The city of Lunaria was inspired by the cover of Pink Floyd's album The Dark Side of the Moon and the paintings of Joan Miró. Animation was provided by Pearl Studio and Sony Pictures Imageworks, and required 120 animators.

Steven Price was confirmed to be the film's composer while new original songs are being handled by Christopher Curtis (from Chaplin: The Musical), Marjorie Duffield and Helen Park (from KPOP the Musical).

The cast was announced in June 2020.

== Soundtrack ==
The score was composed by Steven Price and recorded at Synchron Stage Vienna. Original songs were written by Christopher Curtis, Marjorie Duffield and Helen Park.

=== Tracklist ===
No.	Title	Performer(s)/Composer	Length
1.	"On the Moon Above"	John Cho, Ruthie Ann Miles and Cathy Ang	1:31
2.	"Mooncakes"	Cho, Miles and Ang	4:19
3.	"Rocket to the Moon"	Ang	3:48
4.	"Rocket to the Moon (Reprise)"	Ang	2:01
5.	"Ultraluminary"	Phillipa Soo	3:20
6.	"Hey Boy"	Soo and Robert G. Chiu	1:47
7.	"Wonderful"	Ken Jeong and Ang	2:37
8.	"Yours Forever (Reprise)"	Soo and Conrad Ricamora	2:00
9.	"Love Someone New"	Soo and Ang	3:36
10.	"Moon Phases"	Steven Price	2:13
11.	"It's Good To Meet New People"	Steven Price	3:23
12.	"Family Invasion"	Steven Price	2:47
13.	"Nighttime Conversation"	Steven Price	1:40
14.	"Science Project"	Steven Price	1:44
15.	"Journey To Lunaria"	Steven Price	4:51
16.	"Consider Yourself Welcomed"	Steven Price	5:24
17.	"This Road is a Suicide Mission"	Steven Price	1:38
18.	"A Bonding Experience"	Steven Price	2:55
19.	"I've Lost Everything Now"	Steven Price	5:49
20.	"The Chamber of Exquisite Sadness"	Steven Price	3:44
21.	"Remember When We Said Goodbye"	Steven Price	3:27
22.	"Back Home"	Steven Price	5:12
Total length:			1:10:00

== Release ==
The film was released in select theaters and on Netflix on October 23, 2020. Prior to its October 23 debut, Over the Moon was shown at the Montclair Film Festival on October 17. A day before its release, a book written by animation historian Leonard Maltin about the history about the film called Over the Moon: Illuminating the Journey, was released on October 22. In January 2021, Netflix reported 43 million households had watched the film.

== Reception ==
On the review aggregator website Rotten Tomatoes, 81% of 100 critics' reviews are positive, with an average rating of 6.9/10. The website's critics consensus reads: "Although many of Over the Moon's narrative ingredients will seem familiar, the film's absorbing animation offers colorful compensation." Metacritic, which uses a weighted average, assigned the film a score of 60 out of 100, based on 22 critics, indicating "mixed or average" reviews.

Peter Debruge of Variety wrote: "Sometimes it's OK for an adventure to be just an adventure, and this one gets in the way of its own assets, while pointing to the potential of future journeys from the Netflix animation team."

=== Accolades ===
Award	Date of ceremony	Category	Recipient(s)	Result	Ref.
Academy Awards	April 25, 2021	Best Animated Feature	Glen Keane, Gennie Rim and Peilin Chou	Nominated	
American Cinema Editors Awards	April 17, 2021	Best Edited Animated Feature Film	Edie Ichioka	Nominated	
Annie Awards	April 16, 2021	Outstanding Achievement for Animated Effects in an Animated Production	Ian Farnsworth, Brian Casper, Reinhold Rittinger and Zoran Stojanoski	Nominated	
Annie Awards	April 16, 2021	Outstanding Achievement for Voice Acting in an Animated Feature Production	Robert G. Chiu	Nominated	
Annie Awards	April 16, 2021	Outstanding Achievement for Directing in an Animated Feature Production	Glen Keane	Nominated	
Annie Awards	April 16, 2021	Outstanding Achievement for Music in an Animated Feature Production	Steven Price, Christopher Curtis, Marjorie Duffield and Helen Park	Nominated	
Annie Awards	April 16, 2021	Outstanding Achievement for Writing in an Animated Feature Production	Audrey Wells	Nominated	
Annie Awards	April 16, 2021	Outstanding Achievement for Storyboarding in an Animated Feature Production	Glen Keane	Nominated	
British Academy Children's Awards	November 27, 2022	Feature Film	Glen Keane, Gennie Rim, Peilin Chou	Nominated	
Golden Globe Awards	February 28, 2021	Best Animated Feature Film	Glen Keane	Nominated	
Critics' Choice Super Awards	January 10, 2021	Best Animated Movie	Over the Moon	Nominated	
Critics' Choice Super Awards	January 10, 2021	Best Voice Actress in an Animated Movie	Phillipa Soo	Nominated	
Hollywood Music in Media Awards	January 27, 2021	Best Original Song in an Animated Film	"Rocket to the Moon" – Christopher Curtis, Marjorie Duffield and Helen Park	Nominated	
Motion Picture Sound Editors Awards	April 16, 2021	Outstanding Achievement in Sound Editing – Feature Animation	Jeremy Bowker, Qianbaihui Yang, Chris Frazier, Alyssa Nevarez, Larry Oatfield, Dee Selby, Bradley Farmer, Ronni Brown and Jana Vance	Nominated	
Visual Effects Society Awards	April 6, 2021	Outstanding Visual Effects in an Animated Feature	Glen Keane, Gennie Rim, Céline Desrumaux and David Alexander Smith	Nominated	
Visual Effects Society Awards	April 6, 2021	Outstanding Animated Character in an Animated Feature	Siggi Orri Thorhannesson, Hyesok Kim, Javier Solsona and Alan Chen (for Chang'e)	Nominated	
Visual Effects Society Awards	April 6, 2021	Outstanding Effects Simulations in an Animated Feature	Ian Farnsworth, Brian Casper, Reinhold Rittinger and Jennifer Lasrado	Nominated	
