= Max Vernon =

American performer, songwriter, and playwright (born 1988)

- Born: Max Vernon; May 24, 1988 (age 38)
- Origin: Los Angeles, CA
- Occupation: Playwright · composer · songwriter
- Website: www.maxvernon.com

Max Vernon (born May 24, 1988) is an American performer, songwriter, and playwright from Los Angeles, California, currently living and performing in New York City, where they attended New York University. Best known for their work in musical theatre; their musicals include The View UpStairs, KPOP, and The Tattooed Lady.

== Theatre ==
Max Vernon's original musicals include WIRED (music, lyrics, book; Ars Nova), The View UpStairs (music, lyrics, book; Lynn Redgrave Theatre, Culture Project) - inspired by the UpStairs Lounge arson attack, 30 Million (music, lyrics; book by Jason Kim; Keen Company), KPOP (music, lyrics; book by Jason Kim; Ars Nova), and The Tattooed Lady (music, lyrics, book; Philadelphia Theatre Company).

The View UpStairs has received numerous regional productions since its original Off-Broadway run, including London (Soho Theatre), Richmond, Chicago, Sydney (Hayes Theatre), Los Angeles (Celebration Theatre), San Francisco (New Conservatory Theatre Center), Boston, Atlanta, Dallas, and Columbus, among others. The piece is published by Samuel French, and the original cast album was released on Broadway Records.

== Discography ==
All credits are adapted from the American Society of Composers, Authors and Publishers.

=== Songwriting credits ===
Year	Title	Artist	Album	Writer(s)	Producer(s)
2026	"Mask (Gangle's Song)"	Black Gryph0n, Baasik & Marissa Lenti	Non-album singles	Max Vernon, Nathaneal Brown, Gabriel Brown	Nathaneal Brown, Kyle Horvath
2026	"Cheerleader"	Ella Collier	Non-album singles	Max Vernon, Luke Forester, Ella Cabrera Collier	Leo Forester, Vikiffes
2026	"The Sundown"	Ch4yn	Non-album singles	Max Vernon, Marco Krstic, Lili Pistorious	Marco Krstic
2026	"Dirty Martini"	Rose Rey	Non-album singles	Max Vernon, Rose Rey, Jonathan Clifton Vredenburg	Max Vernon, Jonathan Clifton Vredenburg
2025	"Final Girl"	Kayla Divenere	Non-album singles	Max Vernon, Kayla DiVenere, Zack Djurich	Zack Djurich
2025	"One & Done (featuring Jayelle)	Chapter & Verse	Non-album singles	Max Vernon, Drew Louis, Jayelle Gerber, Barry Pearson	Drew Louis, Chapter & Verse
2025	"Sinderella"	Kat Cunning	Non-album singles	Max Vernon, Kat Cunning, Ryan Hughes	Ryan Hughes, Lukas Costas
2025	"Baddest Habit"	Rose Rey	Non-album singles	Max Vernon, Drew Louis, Rose Rey	Drew Louis
2024	"Put It Down"	Bijou & Jayelle	Non-album singles	Max Vernon, Drew Louis, Jayelle, Benjamin Dorman	Bijou
2024	“Ms. Claus”	Jillian Rossi	Max Vernon, Drew Louis, Jayelle, Jillian Rossi	Drew Louis	
2024	"Let Them Eat Cake"	Trinity the Tuck	Sinematic	Drew Louis	Max Vernon, Drew Louis, Jayelle
2024	"Dance You Outta My Head"	Cat Janice	Non-album single	Max Vernon, Austin Bello, Catherine Ipsan	Max Vernon, Austin Bello, Catherine Ipsan
2023	"Bad Witches"	LVCRFT	V	Bonnie McKee, Jarred Moreno, Max Vernon, Justin Gray	Count Trackula
2023	"Burnin'"	LVCRFT	V	Amanda Warner, David Morup, Bonnie McKee, Max Vernon	Demon Breath, Stavros Tsarouhas
2023	"Fare Thee Well"	LVCRFT	V	David Morup, Max Vernon, Peter Wade Keusch, Sarah Barrios	Norman Crates, Demon Breath
2023	"Still I Love You"	The Original Broadway Cast of KPOP	KPOP (Original Broadway Cast Recording)	Helen Park, Max Vernon	Helen Park, Max Vernon, Harvey Mason Jr., Matt Stine
2023	"Wind Up Doll"	The Original Broadway Cast of KPOP	KPOP (Original Broadway Cast Recording)	Helen Park, Max Vernon	Helen Park, Max Vernon, Harvey Mason Jr., Matt Stine
2023	"Halfway"	The Original Broadway Cast of KPOP	KPOP (Original Broadway Cast Recording)	Helen Park, Max Vernon	Helen Park, Max Vernon, Harvey Mason Jr., Matt Stine
2023	"Hunduruh (Shake It)"	The Original Broadway Cast of KPOP	KPOP (Original Broadway Cast Recording)	Helen Park, Max Vernon	Helen Park, Max Vernon, Harvey Mason Jr., Matt Stine
2023	"Shi Gan Nang Bee (Waste of Time)"	The Original Broadway Cast of KPOP	KPOP (Original Broadway Cast Recording)	Helen Park, Max Vernon	Helen Park, Max Vernon, Harvey Mason Jr., Matt Stine
2023	"Gin & Tonic"	The Original Broadway Cast of KPOP	KPOP (Original Broadway Cast Recording)	Helen Park, Max Vernon	Helen Park, Max Vernon, Harvey Mason Jr., Matt Stine
2023	"Meant 2 B"	The Original Broadway Cast of KPOP	KPOP (Original Broadway Cast Recording)	Helen Park, Max Vernon	Helen Park, Max Vernon, Harvey Mason Jr., Matt Stine
2023	"Upduryuh (Bow Down)"	The Original Broadway Cast of KPOP	KPOP (Original Broadway Cast Recording)	Helen Park, Max Vernon	Helen Park, Max Vernon, Harvey Mason Jr., Matt Stine
2023	"Blast Off"	The Original Broadway Cast of KPOP	KPOP (Original Broadway Cast Recording)	Helen Park, Max Vernon	Helen Park, Max Vernon, Harvey Mason Jr., Matt Stine
2023	"Supergoddess"	The Original Broadway Cast of KPOP	KPOP (Original Broadway Cast Recording)	Helen Park, Max Vernon	Helen Park, Max Vernon, Harvey Mason Jr., Matt Stine
2023	"Upduryuh (Bow Down) Intro"	The Original Broadway Cast of KPOP	KPOP (Original Broadway Cast Recording)	Helen Park, Max Vernon	Helen Park, Max Vernon, Harvey Mason Jr., Matt Stine
2023	"Bung Uh Ree Sae (Mute Bird)"	The Original Broadway Cast of KPOP	KPOP (Original Broadway Cast Recording)	Helen Park, Max Vernon	Helen Park, Max Vernon, Harvey Mason Jr., Matt Stine
2023	"F8 Intro"	The Original Broadway Cast of KPOP	KPOP (Original Broadway Cast Recording)	Helen Park, Max Vernon	Helen Park, Max Vernon, Harvey Mason Jr., Matt Stine
2023	"Perfect"	The Original Broadway Cast of KPOP	KPOP (Original Broadway Cast Recording)	Helen Park, Max Vernon	Helen Park, Max Vernon, Harvey Mason Jr., Matt Stine
2023	"Hanguknom (Korean Man)"	The Original Broadway Cast of KPOP	KPOP (Original Broadway Cast Recording)	Helen Park, Max Vernon	Helen Park, Max Vernon, Harvey Mason Jr., Matt Stine
2023	"Phoenix"	The Original Broadway Cast of KPOP	KPOP (Original Broadway Cast Recording)	Helen Park, Max Vernon	Helen Park, Max Vernon, Harvey Mason Jr., Matt Stine
2023	"This Is My Korea"	The Original Broadway Cast of KPOP	KPOP (Original Broadway Cast Recording)	Helen Park, Max Vernon	Helen Park, Max Vernon, Harvey Mason Jr., Matt Stine
2023	"Amerika (Checkmate)"	The Original Broadway Cast of KPOP	KPOP (Original Broadway Cast Recording)	Helen Park, Max Vernon	Helen Park, Max Vernon, Harvey Mason Jr., Matt Stine
2023	"Super Star" (with Luna)	The Original Broadway Cast of KPOP	KPOP (Original Broadway Cast Recording)	Helen Park, Max Vernon	Helen Park, Max Vernon, Harvey Mason Jr.
2022	"This Is My Korea - TV Edit"	The Original Broadway Cast of KPOP	This Is My Korea (TV Edit)	Helen Park, Max Vernon	Helen Park, Matt Stine
2022	"I Watch You"	Tony & The Kiki	Dirty Secrets	Max Vernon, Paul Charles Heany, Anthony Alfaro	Max Vernon
2022	"I Watch You (Intro)"	Tony & The Kiki	Dirty Secrets	Rodney Allan Bush, Yuka Tadano, Max Vernon, Paul Charles Heaney, Tristan Joel Marzeki, Anthony Alfaro	Max Vernon
2022	"Tell Me Something Good (Live)"	Tony & The Kiki	Back In Black	Stevie Wonder	Max Vernon
2022	"Back In Black (Live)"	Tony & The Kiki	Back In Black	Brian Johnson, Angus Young, Malcom Young	Max Vernon
2022	"Uh Uh Uh"	Tony & The Kiki	Non-album single	Rodney Allan Bush, Max Vernon, Paul Charles Heany, Anthony Alfaro	Max Vernon
2021	"Listen (Outro)"	Tony & The Kiki	Light It Up	Rodney Allan Bush, Max Vernon, Yuka Tadano, Paul Charles Heany, Tristan Joel Marzeski, Anthony Alfaro	Max Vernon
2021	"Paranoid"	Tony & The Kiki	Light It Up	Rodney Allan Bush, Max Vernon, Paul Charles Heany, Anthony Alfaro	Max Vernon
2021	"Listen"	Tony & The Kiki	Light It Up	Rodney Allan Bush, Max Vernon, Paul Charles Heany, Anthony Alfaro	Max Vernon
2021	"Extra Express"	Tony & The Kiki	Light It Up	Rodney Allan Bush, Max Vernon, Paul Charles Heany, Anthony Alfaro	Max Vernon
2021	"Light It Up"	Tony & The Kiki	Light It Up	Rodney Allan Bush, Max Vernon, Paul Charles Heany, Anthony Alfaro	Max Vernon
2017	"#householdname"	The View UpStairs Cast	The View UpStairs (Original Cast Recording)	Max Vernon	Michael Croiter, Jenny Ainsworth, James Dobinson
2017	"Better Than Silence"	The View UpStairs Cast	The View UpStairs (Original Cast Recording)	Max Vernon	Michael Croiter, Jenny Ainsworth, James Dobinson
2017	"Sex on Legs"	The View UpStairs Cast	The View UpStairs (Original Cast Recording)	Max Vernon	Michael Croiter, Jenny Ainsworth, James Dobinson
2017	"Theme Song"	The View UpStairs Cast	The View UpStairs (Original Cast Recording)	Max Vernon	Michael Croiter, Jenny Ainsworth, James Dobinson
2017	"The View Upstairs"	The View UpStairs Cast	The View UpStairs (Original Cast Recording)	Max Vernon	Michael Croiter, Jenny Ainsworth, James Dobinson
2017	"Crazy Notion"	The View UpStairs Cast	The View UpStairs (Original Cast Recording)	Max Vernon	Michael Croiter, Jenny Ainsworth, James Dobinson
2017	"Most Important Thing"	The View UpStairs Cast	The View UpStairs (Original Cast Recording)	Max Vernon	Michael Croiter, Jenny Ainsworth, James Dobinson
2017	"Lost or Found?"	The View UpStairs Cast	The View UpStairs (Original Cast Recording)	Max Vernon	Michael Croiter, Jenny Ainsworth, James Dobinson
2017	"Completely Overdone"	The View UpStairs Cast	The View UpStairs (Original Cast Recording)	Max Vernon	Michael Croiter, Jenny Ainsworth, James Dobinson
2017	"Some Kind of Paradise"	The View UpStairs Cast	The View UpStairs (Original Cast Recording)	Max Vernon	Michael Croiter, Jenny Ainsworth, James Dobinson
2017	"Dead Center"	The View UpStairs Cast	The View UpStairs (Original Cast Recording)	Max Vernon	Michael Croiter, Jenny Ainsworth, James Dobinson
2017	"What I Did Today"	The View UpStairs Cast	The View UpStairs (Original Cast Recording)	Max Vernon	Michael Croiter, Jenny Ainsworth, James Dobinson
2017	"Are You Listening, God?"	The View UpStairs Cast	The View UpStairs (Original Cast Recording)	Max Vernon	Michael Croiter, Jenny Ainsworth, James Dobinson
2017	"And I Wish"	The View UpStairs Cast	The View UpStairs (Original Cast Recording)	Max Vernon	Michael Croiter, Jenny Ainsworth, James Dobinson
2017	"World Outside These Walls"	The View UpStairs Cast	The View UpStairs (Original Cast Recording)	Max Vernon	Michael Croiter, Jenny Ainsworth, James Dobinson
2017	"I Was Meant For More"	The View UpStairs Cast	The View UpStairs (Original Cast Recording)	Max Vernon	Michael Croiter, Jenny Ainsworth, James Dobinson
2017	"Waltz (Endless Night)"	The View UpStairs Cast	The View UpStairs (Original Cast Recording)	Max Vernon	Michael Croiter, Jenny Ainsworth, James Dobinson
2017	"The Future Is Great!!!"	The View UpStairs Cast	The View UpStairs (Original Cast Recording)	Max Vernon	Michael Croiter, Jenny Ainsworth, James Dobinson

== Award and nominations ==
Year	Award	Category	Show	Result
2015	Jonathan Larson Grant	Music/Lyrics	N/A	Won
2016	New York Foundation of the Arts Award	Music	N/A	Won
2017	Off-Broadway Alliance Award	Best Musical	The View UpStairs	Nominated
2017	Audelco Award	Best Musical	The View UpStairs	Nominated
2018	Off-Broadway Alliance Award	Unique Theatrical Experience	KPOP	Won
2018	Drama League Award	Best Musical	KPOP	Nominated
2018	Lucille Lortel Award	Best Musical	KPOP	Won
2018	Drama Desk Award	Best Musical	KPOP	Nominated
2018	Drama Desk Award	Outstanding Music	KPOP	Nominated
2018	Drama Desk Award	Outstanding Lyrics	KPOP	Nominated
2018	Richard Rodgers Award		KPOP	Won
2019	WhatsOnStage Award	Best Off-West End Production	The View UpStairs	Nominated
2020	Pew Arts Grant	Book/Music/Lyrics	The Tattooed Lady	Won
2023	Tony Award	Best Original Score	KPOP	Nominated
2023	Barrymore Award	Outstanding Original Music	The Tattooed Lady	Nominated
