= Jonathan Deans =

English sound designer

- Born: 1954 (age 70–71); England
- Occupation: Sound Designer

Jonathan Deans is an English sound designer. His work spans from Covent Garden, the Royal Opera House to The Beatles 'LOVE' and Michael Jackson's 'ONE' in Las Vegas to Broadway.

Deans has been nominated for Tony and Drama Desk Awards. He is also been presented with a USITT award for his distinguished career in music.

== Stage credits ==
Year	Title	Role	Venue	Ref.
1993	The Twilight of the Golds	Sound Designer	Broadway, Booth Theatre	
1994	Damn Yankees	Sound Designer	Broadway, Marquis Theatre	
1997	Candide	Sound Designer	Broadway, Gershwin Theatre	
1997	King David	Sound Designer	Broadway, New Amsterdam Theatre	
1997	Street Corner Symphony	Sound Designer	Broadway, Brooks Atkinson Theatre	
1998	Ragtime	Sound Designer	Broadway, Ford Center for the Performing Arts	
1998	Parade	Sound Designer	Broadway, Vivian Beaumont Theatre	
1999	Fosse	Sound Designer	Broadway, Broadhurst Theatre	
2000	The Music Man	Sound Designer	Broadway, Neil Simon Theatre	
2000	Seussical	Sound Designer	Broadway, Richard Rodgers Theatre	
2001	Follies	Sound Designer	Broadway, Belasco Theatre	
2003	Taboo	Sound Designer	Broadway, Plymouth Theatre	
2004	Brooklyn	Sound Designer	Broadway, Plymouth Theatre	
2006	Lestat	Sound Designer	Broadway, Palace Theatre	
2007	The Pirate Queen	Sound Designer	Broadway, Hilton Theatre	
2007	Young Frankenstein	Sound Designer	Broadway, Hilton Theatre	
2010	La Cage Aux Folles	Sound Designer	Broadway, Longacre Theatre	
2011	Priscilla Queen of the Desert	Sound Designer	Broadway, Palace Theatre	
2011	Spiderman: Turn Off The Dark	Sound Designer	Broadway, Foxwoods Theatre	
2012	Carrie	Sound Designer	Off-Broadway, Music Box Theatre	
2013	Pippin	Sound Designer	Broadway, Music Box Theatre	
2015	Finding Neverland	Sound Designer	Broadway, Lunt-Fontanne Theatre	
2016	Waitress	Sound Designer	Broadway, Brooks Atkinson Theatre	
2019	Jagged Little Pill	Sound Designer	Broadway, Broadhurst Theatre	
2021	Waitress	Sound Designer	Broadway, Ethel Barrymore Theatre	
2022	1776	Sound Designer	Broadway, American Airlines Theatre	
2022	Ain't No Mo	Sound Designer	Broadway, Belasco Theatre	
2023	Buena Vista Social Club	Sound Designer	Off-Broadway, Linda Gross Theatre	
2025	Redwood	Sound Designer	Broadway, Nederlander Theatre	
2025	Buena Vista Social Club	Sound Designer	Broadway, Gerald Schoenfeld Theatre	

== Awards and nominations ==
Year	Award	Category	Nominated work	Result	Ref.
1999	Drama Desk Awards	Outstanding Sound Design	Parade	Nominated	
2010	Tony Awards	Best Sound Design of a Musical	La Cage Aux Folles	Nominated	
2010	Drama Desk Awards	Outstanding Sound Design in a Musical	La Cage Aux Folles	Nominated	
2012	Drama Desk Awards	Outstanding Sound Design in a Musical	Carrie	Nominated	
2013	Tony Awards	Best Sound Design of a Musical	Pippin	Nominated	
2020	Tony Awards	Best Sound Design of a Musical	Jagged Little Pill	Nominated	
2023	Tony Awards	Best Sound Design of a Play	Ain't No Mo'	Nominated	
2024	Lucille Lortel Awards	Outstanding Sound Design	Buena Vista Social Cub	Nominated	
2025	Tony Awards	Best Sound Design in a Musical	Buena Vista Social Cub	Won	

== See also ==
- Tony Award for Best Sound Design
