= Kai Harada (sound designer) =

Sound designer

Kai Harada is a sound designer for the stage. His career began with "15 or so years" of working as the assistant and associate to sound designer Tony Meola, including the Broadway productions of Wicked and The Lion King. He has since sound designed or provided audio consultancy on 24 Broadway productions. He has won two Tony Awards for Best Sound Design of a Musical, having received nomination in the category 6 times.

== Stage credits ==
Year	Title	Role	Venue	Ref.
1998	The Sound of Music	Assistant Sound Designer	Broadway, Martin Beck Theatre	
1998	High Society	Associate Sound Designer	Broadway, St. James Theatre	
1998	Footloose	Assistant Sound Designer	Broadway, Richard Rodgers Theatre	
1999	Kiss Me, Kate	Associate Sound Designer	Broadway, Martin Beck Theatre	
2000	The Wild Party	Associate Sound Designer	Broadway, Virginia Theatre	
2002	Sweet Smell of Success	Associate Sound Designer	Broadway, Martin Beck Theatre	
2002	Man of La Mancha	Associate Sound Designer	Broadway, Al Hirschfeld Theatre	
2010	Million Dollar Quartet	Sound Designer	Broadway, Nederlander Theatre	
2011	Follies	Sound Designer	Broadway, Marquis Theatre	
2013	First Date	Sound Designer	Broadway, Longacre Theatre	
2014	Hedwig and the Angry Inch	Audio Consultant	Broadway, Belasco Theatre	
2014	On The Town	Sound Designer	Broadway, Lyric Theatre	
2015	Gigi	Sound Designer	Broadway, Neil Simon Theatre	
2015	Fun Home	Sound Designer	Broadway, Circle in the Square Theatre	
2015	Allegiance	Sound Designer	Broadway, Longacre Theatre	
2016	Wicked	Associate Sound Designer	Broadway, Gershwin Theatre	
2017	Amélie	Sound Designer	Broadway, Walter Kerr Theatre	
2017	The Band's Visit	Sound Designer	Broadway, Ethel Barrymore Theatre	
2017	Head Over Heels	Sound Designer	Broadway, Hudson Theatre	
2019	The Lion King	Assistant Sound Designer	Broadway, Minskoff Theatre	
2022	Mr. Saturday Night	Sound Designer	Broadway, Nederlander Theatre	
2022	Kimberly Akimbo	Sound Designer	Broadway, Booth Theatre	
2022	Mike Birbiglia: The Old Man & the Pool	Sound Designer	Broadway, Vivian Beaumont Theatre	
2023	New York, New York	Sound Designer	Broadway, St. James Theatre	
2023	Merrily We Roll Along	Sound Designer	Broadway, Hudson Theatre	
2023	Spamalot	Sound Designer	Broadway, St. James Theatre	
2024	Days of Wine and Roses	Sound Designer	Broadway, Studio 54	
2024	Once Upon a Mattress	Sound Designer	Broadway, Hudson Theatre	
2024	A Wonderful World: The Louis Armstrong Musical	Sound Designer	Broadway, Studio 54	
2025	Dead Outlaw	Sound Designer	Broadway, Longacre Theatre	
2025	Ragtime	Sound Designer	Broadway, Vivian Beaumont Theatre	
2026	Cats: The Jellicle Ball	Sound Designer	Broadway, Broadhurst Theatre	
2026	Beaches	Sound Designer	Broadway, Majestic Theatre	

== Awards and nominations ==
Year	Award	Category	Work	Result	Ref.
2012	Tony Award	Best Sound Design of a Musical	Follies	Nominated	
2012	Drama Desk Award	Outstanding Sound Design of a Musical	Follies	Nominated	
2014	Drama Desk Award	Outstanding Sound Design of a Musical	Fun Home	Nominated	
2018	Tony Award	Best Sound Design of a Musical	The Band's Visit	Won	
2018	Drama Desk Award	Outstanding Sound Design of a Musical	The Band's Visit	Won	
2020	Drama Desk Award	Outstanding Sound Design of a Musical	Soft Power	Nominated	
2022	Drama Desk Award	Outstanding Sound Design of a Musical	Kimberly Akimbo	Nominated	
2023	Tony Award	Best Sound Design of a Musical	New York, New York	Nominated	
2023	Outer Critics Circle Award	Outstanding Sound Design	New York, New York	Nominated	
2024	Tony Award	Best Sound Design of a Musical	Merrily We Roll Along	Nominated	
2024	Drama Desk Award	Outstanding Sound Design of a Musical	Merrily We Roll Along	Nominated	
2026	Tony Award	Best Sound Design of a Musical	Cats: The Jellicle Ball	Nominated	
2026	Tony Award	Best Sound Design of a Musical	Ragtime	Won	
2026	Drama Desk Award	Outstanding Sound Design of a Musical	Ragtime	Nominated	
