= Cat Janice =

American musician (1993–2024)

Catherine Janice

Background information
- Born: Catherine Janice Ipsan; January 20, 1993; Northern Virginia, U.S.
- Died: February 28, 2024 (aged 31) Annandale, Virginia, U.S.
- Genres: Dance, electronic, disco-pop, alt-pop
- Occupations: Musician; singer; songwriter
- Years active: 2014–2024
- Spouse: Kyle Higginbotham (m. 2023)
- Website: catjanicemusic.com

Catherine Janice Ipsan (January 20, 1993 – February 28, 2024), known professionally as Cat Janice, was an American singer-songwriter. Janice wrote and sang "Dance You Outta My Head", which went viral on TikTok.

== Early life ==
Catherine Janice Ipsan was born on January 20, 1993, in Northern Virginia and was raised in Annandale, Virginia. Janice learned to play violin and piano at the age of six. She had 14 years of classical training, during which she joined an orchestra, jazz bands, and theatrical productions. She started writing her music around the age of 12, and she later taught herself how to produce her own music.

== Music career ==
Janice released her first album, with her singing and playing piano, in 2014. Her second album, Fire, was more Southern rock and was released the next year. In 2019, Janice won a Washington Area Music Award (WAMMY) in the category of Best Rock Artist. Janice's song "Pricey" appeared in an episode of "Selling Sunset" in 2020. Another song of hers appeared on the Country Music Television show "Redneck Island".

After finding a lump in her neck in 2022, Janice was diagnosed with a sarcoma, a rare, aggressive type of cancerous tumor that affects the bone marrow, in her scalene muscle. At the time, Janice was working as a geospatial information scientist, taking classes toward a master's degree in coastal geology, and writing and singing her own music.

Janice had surgery to remove the tumor and had chemotherapy. Janice worked on her album, Modern Medicine, while under treatment. Janice wrote the song "Wishing I Was You" about her cancer and chemotherapy. Her son appeared in the song's video. Her song "Chill the Fck Out", released in January 2023, is about struggling with stress and feeling overwhelmed. The following year, Janice's doctors said she was free of cancer, but a few months later the cancer metastasized to her lungs. Janice restarted chemotherapy, and she released "Modern Medicine" a few months later. She performed with SOJA at the Wolf Trap National Park for the Performing Arts in the summer of 2023. Janice became engaged to her partner Kyle Higginbotham that August, and the two married that December, knowing her time was short.

Janice released her song "Dance You Outta My Head" on TikTok on January 19, 2024, four days after beginning hospice. Co-written with Max Vernon, the song is about being one's absolute best, going out, and deciding to just dance troubles out of one's head. Janice decided to release the song independently, rather than through her usual recording label, to release the song more quickly. Online she wrote, "I think I'm being called home. My last joy would be if you pre-saved my song 'Dance You Outta My Head' in my bio and streamed it because all proceeds go straight to my 7-year-old boy I'm leaving behind." Janice transferred the rights to all her songs to her son. The song was inspired by a line, "Dance until you love me", that she and her son randomly sang over and over while on a drive one day.

Two weeks after being released, "Dance You Outta My Head" charted at number 37 on Billboard's Hot Dance/Electronic Songs. The song also debuted at number 2 on Billboard's Dance/Electronic Digital Song Sales and number 11 on the overall Digital Song Sales chart. It reached number 1 on the TikTok Billboard Top 50 on February 17. On iTunes, the song reached number 7 worldwide, number 1 in Romania, Ireland, and the Czech Republic, and number 12 in the United States. The song won the Robert Allen Award from the ASCAP Foundation.

== Death ==
Janice died of Ewing sarcoma at home in Annandale on February 28, 2024, at the age of 31, surrounded by her family. Her brother shared on Instagram that additional projects created by Janice would be released posthumously with her consent. "Starry Night (Loren's Lullaby)", a lullaby for her son Loren, was her first song released posthumously, on March 8.
