= Crystal Lucas-Perry =

American actress

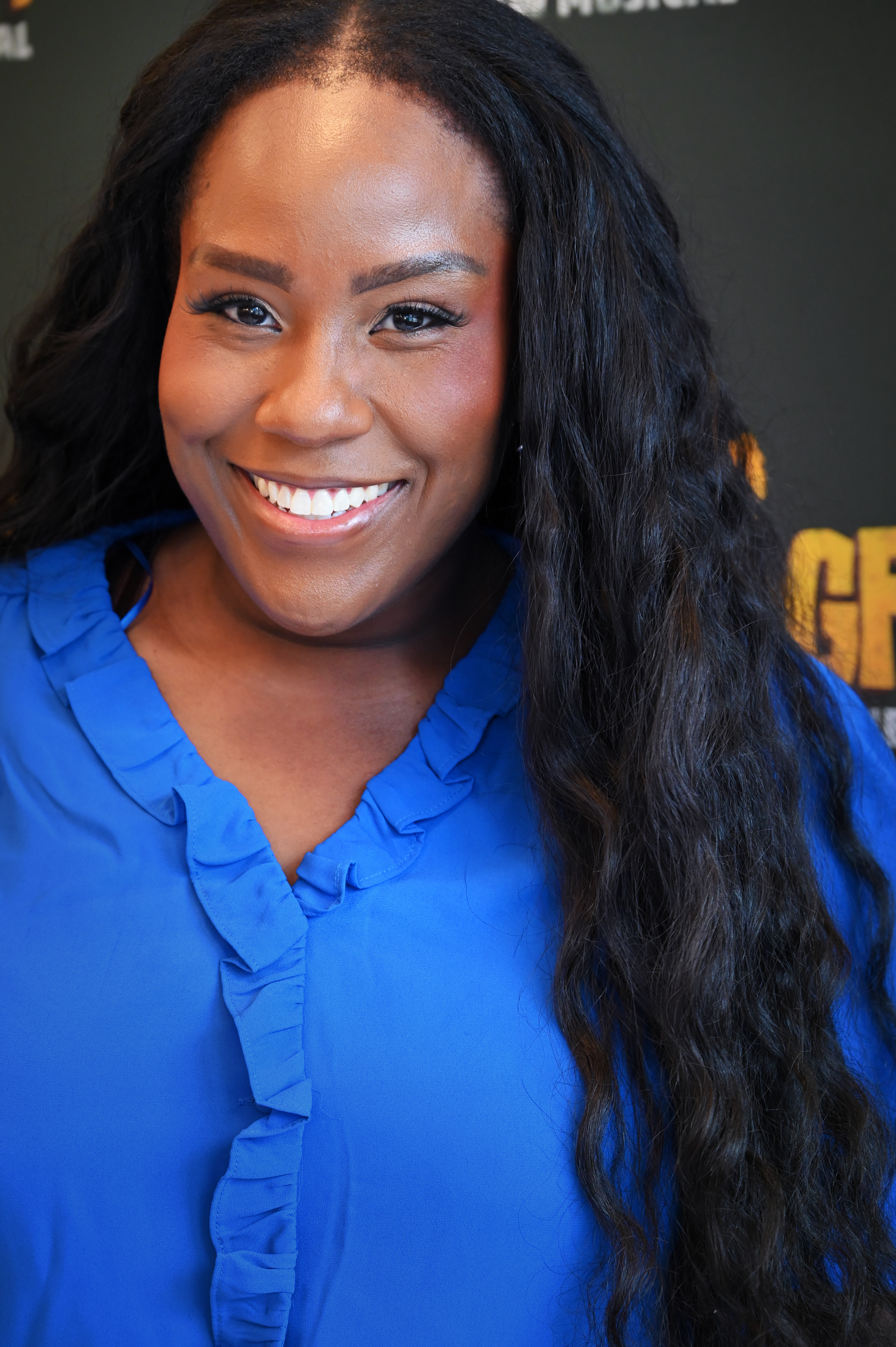
- Lucas-Perry in 2026

Crystal Lucas-Perry is an American actress, singer, songwriter and producer. She is known for her performances on Broadway starring in the musical revival of 1776 (2022), and the Jordan E. Cooper sketch-play Ain't No Mo' (2023), the latter earning her a Tony Award nomination for Best Featured Actress in a Play.

== Education ==
Lucas-Perry attended both Western Michigan University, (BFA) from which she graduated in 2010, and New York University Tisch School of the Arts, (MFA) from which she graduated in 2013.

== Career ==
Lucas-Perry was a member of the cast of Jordan E. Cooper's sketch play Ain't No Mo' for its premiere Off-Broadway in 2019.

In September 2022 Lucas-Perry made her Broadway debut as John Adams in the musical revival of 1776.

When Ain't No Mo' transferred to Broadway at the beginning of December, she reprised her roles in the production. Deadline Hollywood wrote positively of her performance adding, "Lucas-Perry returns later in the show in one of the most emotionally powerful of the sketches...playing [a] convict to be released from a prison." Although the play failed to find an audience and was a commercial failure it received six Tony Award nominations including for Lucas-Perry who was nominated for the Tony Award for Best Featured Actress in a Play and won a Dorian Award for Outstanding Featured Performance in a Broadway Play.

== Theatre credits ==
Year	Title	Role	Venue	Ref.
2015	Little Children Dream of God	Madison	Roundabout Underground	
2015	Storm, Still	Goneril, Edgar	Brooklyn Backyard	
2016	A Sign of the Times	Tanya	Goodspeed Musicals	
2017	Bastard Jones	Lady Bellaston	Cell Theater	
2017	Bull in a China Shop		Off-Broadway, Claire Tow Theater	
2017	The Taming of the Shrew	Petruchio	Regional, Chicago Shakespeare Theater	
2018	A Sign of the Times	Tanya	Regional, Delaware Theatre Company	
2019	Ain't No Mo'	Passenger #5	Off-Broadway, The Public Theater	
2019	A Bright Room Called Day	Zillah	Off-Broadway, The Public Theater	
2022	1776	John Adams	Regional, America Repertory Theatre	
2022	1776	John Adams	Broadway, American Airlines Theatre	
2022	Ain't No Mo'	Passenger #5	Broadway, Belasco Theatre	
2024	A Sign of the Times	Tanya	Off-Broadway, New World Stages	
2025	The Great Privation	Mrs. Freeman/Minnie	Off-Broadway, Soho Rep	
2026	Bigfoot! The Musical	Francine	Off-Broadway, New York City Center	

== Awards and nominations ==
Year	Award	Category	Work	Result	Ref.
2019	Lucille Lortel Awards	Outstanding Featured Actress in a Play	Ain't No Mo'	Won	
2020	Antonyo Awards	Best Featured Actor in a Play Off-Broadway	A Bright Room Called Day	Nominated	
2023	Tony Awards	Best Featured Actress in a Play	Ain't No Mo'	Nominated	
2023	Dorian Award	Outstanding Featured Performance in a Broadway Play	Ain't No Mo'	Won	
2025	Obie Award	Distinguished Performance	Pericles: A Public Works Concert Experience and The Great Privation (How to flip ten cents into a dollar)	Won	
