= Jennifer Weber =

American choreographer

Jennifer Weber is an American choreographer for theatre and film. She is best known for choreographing the original Broadway productions of KPOP and & Juliet, for which she received two nominations for the Tony Award for Best Choreography in 2023.

== Career ==
Weber studied communications at the University of Pennsylvania.

=== Theatre ===
Weber made her Broadway debut on November 17, 2022, as the choreographer for the original Broadway production of & Juliet. Weber also choreographed KPOP, which opened later that same month. In 2023, she was nominated for the Drama Desk Award for Outstanding Choreography for KPOP, and both the Outer Critics Circle Award for Outstanding Choreography and Chita Rivera Awards for Outstanding Choreography for & Juliet. At the 76th Tony Awards, Weber was nominated for Best Choreography for both & Juliet and KPOP.

In 2025, Weber choreographed Redwood on Broadway.

=== Film and television ===
In 2022, Weber choreographed the Disney Channel movie Zombies 2. Later the same year, she also choreographed and produced the Christmas special The Hip Hop Nutcracker for Disney+.
