= Adam Honoré =

American lighting designer

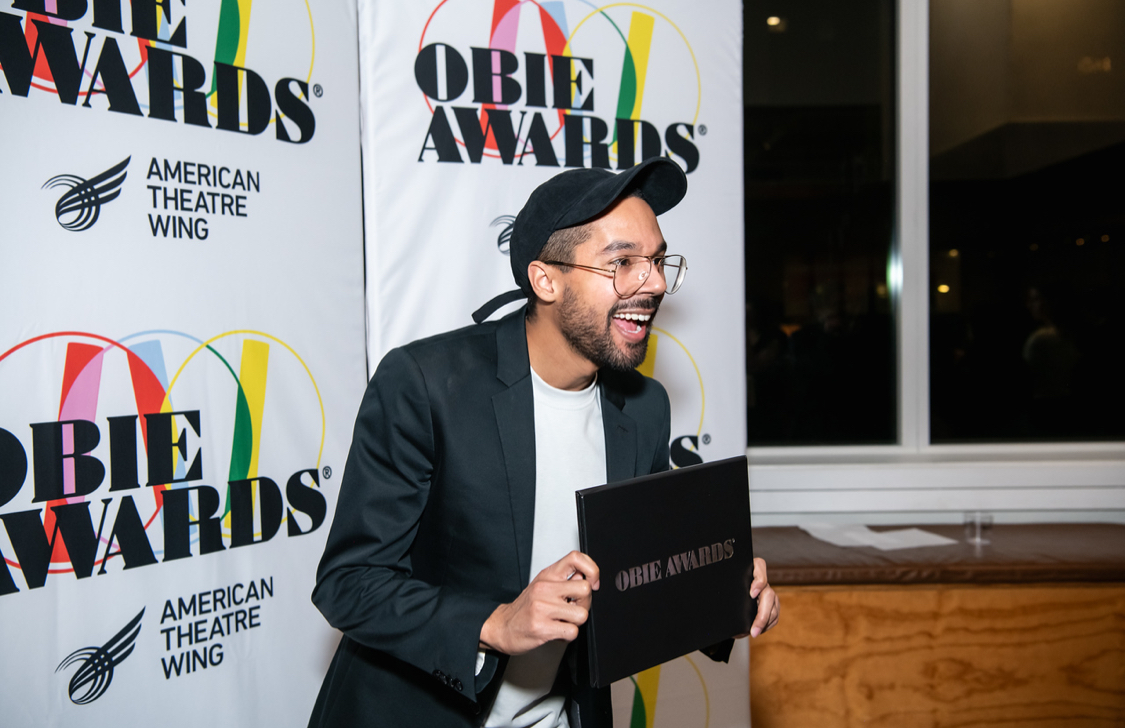
- Born: 1993 or 1994 (age 32–33); New Orleans, Louisiana, U.S.
- Education: University of Oklahoma (BFA)

Adam Honoré (born 1993/1994) is an American lighting designer. In 2025, he received an Obie Award for Sustained Achievement in Lighting Design and has been nominated for two Tony Awards.

== Career ==
Honoré graduated from the University of Oklahoma in 2015 with a Bachelor of Fine Arts degree in lighting design. He has designed lighting for Broadway, Off-Broadway and regional theatre productions. He has also designed internationally, including the international premiere of Fun Home in the Philippines.

== Selected productions ==
=== Broadway ===
- Cats: The Jellicle Ball – 2025
- Ragtime – 2025
- Jeff Ross: Take a Banana for the Ride – 2025
- Purlie Victorious – 2024
- Ain't No Mo' – 2022
- Chicken & Biscuits – 2021

=== Off-Broadway ===
- Ain't No Mo' – 2019
- Carmen Jones – 2018

== Awards and nominations ==
Year	Result	Award	Category	Work	Ref.
2018	Won	AUDELCO Award	Lighting design	Carmen Jones	
2019	Nominated	Drama Desk Awards	Outstanding Lighting Design of a Musical	Carmen Jones	
2025	Nominated	Drama Desk Awards	Outstanding Lighting Design of a Musical	Cats: The Jellicle Ball	
2026	Nominated	Drama Desk Awards	Outstanding Lighting Design of a Musical	Amahl and the Night Visitors	
2026	Nominated	Drama Desk Awards	Outstanding Lighting Design of a Musical	Ragtime	
2026	Nominated	Tony Awards	Best Lighting Design in a Musical	Ragtime	
2026	Nominated	Tony Awards	Best Lighting Design in a Musical	Cats: The Jellicle Ball	
2026	Nominated	Outer Critics Circle Awards	Outstanding Lighting Design	Cats: The Jellicle Ball	
