= Brian Ronan =

Sound designer

- Born: Queens, New York
- Education: Oswego State University (BA)
- Occupation: Sound designer
- Awards: Tony Award for Best Sound Design of a Musical (2)

Brian Ronan is a sound designer known for his work on productions such as Spring Awakening in 2008, Next to Normal in 2009, and his Tony Award-winning work on The Book of Mormon and Beautiful: The Carole King Musical.

== Early life ==
Ronan was born in Queens, New York and attended Chaminade University in Hawaii before an art professor recruited him to help on a production set. After this, he decided to pursue theatre and transferred to Oswego State University. While there, he worked with Campus Lighting, a student organization focusing on the business side of the arts. He also interned with Masque Sound in New York City, before graduating with a Bachelor of Arts in theatrical design and production in 1984.

== Career ==
Ronan's career first began as an associate sound designer for the Broadway production of Smokey Joe's Cafe in 1995 and stayed with the production through its closing in 2000. He continued his work in New York City throughout the 1990s, serving as sound designer for notable productions such as State Fair in 1996, Triumph of Love and 1776, both in 1997, along with Little Me in 1998.

In the 2000's, Ronan continued work both on Broadway and Off-Broadway, for such productions as the 2004 premiere of Bug and the Broadway productions of Grey Gardens in 2007 and Spring Awakening in 2008. For his work on Next to Normal in 2009, he received his first Tony Award nomination for Best Sound Design of a Musical.

During the 2010s, Ronan gained further notoriety for his sound designs, including his innovative hidden microphone techniques on the 2012 revival of Annie. His work was featured in the hit musicals, The Book of Mormon and Beautiful: The Carole King Musical, winning a Tony Award for each. His work could also be seen in the 2011 revival of Anything Goes, the 2012 revival of Nice Work If You Can Get It, Mean Girls in 2018 and The Rocky Horror Show in 2026, all four for which he received further Tony Award nominations.

== Awards and nominations ==
Year	Award	Category	Work	Result	Ref.
2004	Drama Desk Award	Outstanding Sound Design	Bug	Nominated	
2006	Drama Desk Award	Outstanding Sound Design	Grey Gardens	Nominated	
2006	Drama Desk Award	Outstanding Sound Design	The Pajama Game	Nominated	
2009	Tony Award	Best Sound Design of a Musical	Next to Normal	Nominated	
2010	Drama Desk Award	Outstanding Sound Design in a Musical	Promises, Promises	Nominated	
2010	Drama Desk Award	Outstanding Sound Design in a Musical	Everyday Rapture	Nominated	
2011	Drama Desk Award	Outstanding Sound Design in a Musical	Anything Goes	Won	
2011	Drama Desk Award	Outstanding Sound Design in a Musical	The Book of Mormon	Nominated	
2011	Tony Award	Best Sound Design of a Musical	The Book of Mormon	Won	
2012	Tony Award	Best Sound Design of a Musical	Nice Work If You Can Get It	Nominated	
2013	Drama Desk Award	Outstanding Sound Design in a Musical	Giant	Nominated	
2013	Drama Desk Award	Outstanding Sound Design in a Musical	Bring It On	Nominated	
2014	Drama Desk Award	Outstanding Sound Design in a Musical	Beautiful: The Carole King Musical	Won	
2014	Tony Award	Best Sound Design of a Musical	Beautiful: The Carole King Musical	Won	
2015	Drama Desk Award	Outstanding Sound Design in a Musical	The Last Ship	Nominated	
2016	Drama Desk Award	Outstanding Sound Design in a Musical	Lazarus	Nominated	
2017	Drama Desk Award	Outstanding Sound Design in a Musical	War Paint	Nominated	
2018	Tony Award	Best Sound Design of a Musical	Mean Girls	Nominated	
2019	Drama Desk Award	Outstanding Sound Design in a Musical	Tootsie	Nominated	
2026	Tony Award	Best Sound Design of a Musical	The Rocky Horror Show	Nominated	
