= The View UpStairs =

Musical with music, lyrics and book by Max Vernon

- Promotional art
- Music: Max Vernon
- Lyrics: Max Vernon
- Book: Max Vernon
- Premiere: 28 February 2017: Lynn Redgrave Theater, New York City
- Productions: 2017 Off-Broadway; 2018 Sydney; 2019 London; 2022 Japan; Various independent productions (see below)

The View UpStairs is a musical with music, lyrics and book by Max Vernon based on the real-life events of the 1973 arson attack at the UpStairs Lounge, a gay bar in New Orleans. This attack resulted in the deaths of 32 people, the deadliest attack on a gay club in U.S. history before the 2016 Orlando nightclub shooting. The show is inspired by and pays tributes to many of the patrons who frequented the venue.

The single-act show runs for approximately 1 hour and 45 minutes and is set entirely within the UpStairs Lounge.

== Background ==
The show's score was composed by Max Vernon in 2013 and was first performed on June 24 of that year in a concert setting with performers such as Michael McElroy and Nathan Lee Graham (who eventually went on to originate the role of Willie) amongst others. The show then went into a workshop period in March 2016 under Invisible Wall Productions with Scott Ebersold as director and Matt Aument as musical director. The cast performed a benefit concert on July 11, 2016, for the victims and survivors of the Orlando nightclub shooting, with all proceeds going to the 'Equality Florida' institution.

== Productions ==
The View UpStairs was first produced Off-Broadway by Invisible Wall Productions, and was also under the direction of Scott Ebersold. It began previews on February 15, 2017, at the Lynn Redgrave Theater in New York and officially premiered on February 26, before closing on May 21, 2017. It has since received a regional premiere in Richmond, Virginia and Los Angeles.

The show had its international premiere at the Hayes Theatre in Sydney, Australia, under the direction of Shaun Rennie. The show was put on as part of the 40th anniversary celebrations of the Sydney Gay and Lesbian Mardi Gras and began previews on 8 February 2018 before opening on 11 February. The sold out season of 33 performances concluded on 11 March 2018.

Following the success of prior productions of the musical, several US regional productions were scheduled for the 2018–2019 season including:

- Circle Theatre's production in Chicago from 22 June to 22 July 2018
- Out Front Theatre Company's production in Atlanta from 25 October to 19 November 2018
- The Desert Rose Playhouse production in Palm Springs from 8 to 29 March 2019
- New Conservatory Theatre Company's production in San Francisco from 10 May to 9 June 2019
- Good Company Theatre's production in Ogden from 7 to 23 June 2019
- Uptown Players' production in Dallas from 21 June to 7 July 2019
- SpeakEasy Stage Company's production in Boston from 31 May to 22 June 2019
- Evolution Theatre Inc's production in Columbus from 17 to 27 July 2019

The show had its European premiere at the Soho Theatre in London. This production was directed by Jonathan O’Boyle and ran from 18 July to 24 August 2019.

In February 2022 the show had its first run in Japan. This production was translated, adapted, directed and choreographed by Yojiro Ichikawa.

== Characters ==
Character	Description
Wes	20-something fashion designer from the current day. Self-consciously hip, prematurely jaded, and perpetually anxious. Wes wears a fabulous façade, but deep down harbors real insecurities and dissatisfaction with his life. Has never experienced real tragedy or love.
Patrick	Young, runaway hustler who projects innocence and fragility, but is a lot tougher than he appears. Patrick creates fantastic, imaginative stories to distract from the harsher realities of his life. Has the ability to see a vulnerability and sweetness in Wes.
Buddy	The resident piano player of the UpStairs Lounge. Charismatic, but also very temperamental and somewhat bitter. Loves the attention he commands within the community, but also resents being stuck in it. Dreams of one day being a big star, but knows it will never happen. Closeted, with a wife.
Willie	Black. Holdover from another era of gay life with a more camp sensibility. Might know all the secrets of the universe, might be in the early stages of dementia.
Henri	Tough as nails, no-nonsense, old-school butch. Henri is the bartender of the UpStairs Lounge and runs a tight ship. Although she comes across as a bit severe, she cares very deeply for the community within the bar.
Freddy	A Latino construction worker by day, Freddy also doubles as the drag queen Aurora Whorealis by night. Big personality, energetic, and bright. A close friend to Willie and on good terms with everyone else in the bar.
Inez	Freddy's mother and also occasionally a mother to the other men in the UpStairs Lounge. Born in Puerto Rico, she moved her family to America when Freddy was still young. Lovable, warm, and supportive, Inez assists with her son's drag performances.
Richard	Priest of the Metropolitan Community Church. Perhaps more conservative than other patrons in the bar, but level-headed and warm. The name Rita Mae is used when Richard is played by a woman.
Dale	Arsonist. Sensitive and more radical in his sexual politics. A raw nerve and someone who's experienced a good deal of hardship at society's hand.
Cop	In the past the cop is a corrupt, homophobic, and violent. In the present, the cop is still stern, but has a sense of humor, and seems to be in service of justice.
Realtor	The untrustworthy, fake real estate agent who sells Wes the burnt site of The UpStairs Lounge; Smarmy, fake, smiles too much, etc.

== Casts ==
Character	Off-Broadway 2017	Sydney 2018	London 2019	Japan 2022
Wes	Jeremy Pope	Henry Rollo	Tyrone Huntley	Soichi Hirama
Patrick	Taylor Frey	Stephen Madsen	Andy Mientus	Yuta Koseki
Buddy	Randy Redd	Anthony Harkin	John Partridge	Hiroshi Hatanaka
Willie	Nathan Lee Graham	Madison McKoy	Cedric Neal	Kojiro Oka
Henri	Frenchie Davis	Markesha McCoy	Carly Mercedes Dyer	Haruko Sekiya
Freddy	Michael Longoria	Ryan Gonzalez	Garry Lee	Shogo Sakamoto
Inez	Nancy Ticotin	Martelle Hammer	Victoria Hamilton-Barritt	JKim
Richard	Benjamin Howes	Thomas Campbell	Joseph Prouse	Shunsuke Omura (SHUN)
Dale	Ben Mayne	David Hooley	Declan Bennett	Yoshihisa Higashiyama
Cop	Richard E. Waits	Nick Eroll	Derek Hagen	Takumi Ohmine
Realtor	Nancy Ticotin	Martelle Hammer	Derek Hagen	Takumi Ohmine

== Musical numbers ==
The Original Off-Broadway Cast recording was released on 11 August 2017.

- "Some Kind of Paradise" - Buddy, Company
- "#householdname" - Wes
- "Lost and Found" - Buddy, Company
- "What I Did Today" - Patrick
- "Are You Listening, God?" - Company
- "The World Outside These Walls" - Henri, Company
- "Completely Overdone" - Inez, Company
- "The Future is Great" - Wes, Company
- "Waltz" - Patrick, Company
- "Sex on Legs" - Freddy, Company
- "Better Than Silence" - Dale
- "The Most Important Thing" - Inez, Company
- "Crazy Notion" - Wes, Patrick, Company
- "Theme Song" - Willie, Company
- "And I Wish"‡ - Patrick
- "The View UpStairs" - Wes, Company

‡ Cut song that is optional to put back in the show

== Awards and nominations ==
=== Original Off-Broadway production ===
Source: Lortel.org

Year	Award	Category	Nominee	Result
2017	Drama Desk Award	Outstanding Set Design of a Musical	Jason Sherwood	Nominated
2017	Drama Desk Award	Outstanding Costume Design	Anita Yavich	Nominated
2017	Drama Desk Award	Outstanding Wig and Hair	Jason Hayes	Nominated
2017	Off Broadway Alliance Awards	Best Musical	The View UpStairs	Nominated
2017	Audelco Award	Director/Musical Production	Scott Ebersold	Nominated
2017	Audelco Award	Outstanding Performance in a Musical - Male	Nathan Lee Graham	Nominated
2017	Audelco Award	Outstanding Musical Director	James Dobinson	Nominated
2017	Audelco Award	Musical Production of the Year	The View UpStairs	Nominated
2017	Lortel Award	Outstanding Featured Actor in a Musical	Nathan Lee Graham	Nominated
2017	Lortel Award	Outstanding Scenic Design	Jason Sherwood	Nominated
2017	Henry Hewes Design Awards	Scenic Design	Jason Sherwood	Nominated
2017	Henry Hewes Design Awards	Costume Design	Anita Yavich	Nominated

=== Sydney production ===
Year	Award	Category	Nominee	Result
2018	Sydney Theatre Award	Best Production of a Musical	The View UpStairs	Nominated
2018	Sydney Theatre Award	Best Direction of a Musical	Shaun Rennie	Nominated
2018	Sydney Theatre Award	Best Lighting Design of an Independent Production	Trent Suidgeest	Nominated
2018	Sydney Theatre Award	Best Stage Design of an Independent Production	Isabel Hudson	Nominated
2018	BroadwayWorld Awards			
2018	BroadwayWorld Awards	Best Musical	The View UpStairs	Nominated
2018	BroadwayWorld Awards	Best Director/Musical	Shaun Rennie	Nominated
2018	BroadwayWorld Awards	Best Actor in a Musical	Henry Brett	Nominated
2018	BroadwayWorld Awards	Best Supporting Actor in a Musical	Ryan Gonzalez	Nominated
2018	BroadwayWorld Awards	Best Supporting Actor in a Musical	Stephen Madsen	Nominated
2018	BroadwayWorld Awards	Best Supporting Actress in a Musical	Markesha McCoy	Nominated
2018	BroadwayWorld Awards	Best Ensemble Performance in a Musical	The View UpStairs	Nominated
2018	BroadwayWorld Awards	Best Scenic Design	Isabel Hudson	Nominated
2018	BroadwayWorld Awards	Best Lighting Design	Trent Suidgeest	Nominated
2018	BroadwayWorld Awards	Best Sound Design	Neil Mcclean	Nominated
2018	BroadwayWorld Awards	Best Costume Design	Anita Yavich	Nominated
2018	Glugs Awards	The Stuart Wagstaff Memorial Award for Most Outstanding Direction	Shaun Rennie	Nominated
