= Jordan E. Cooper =

American playwright

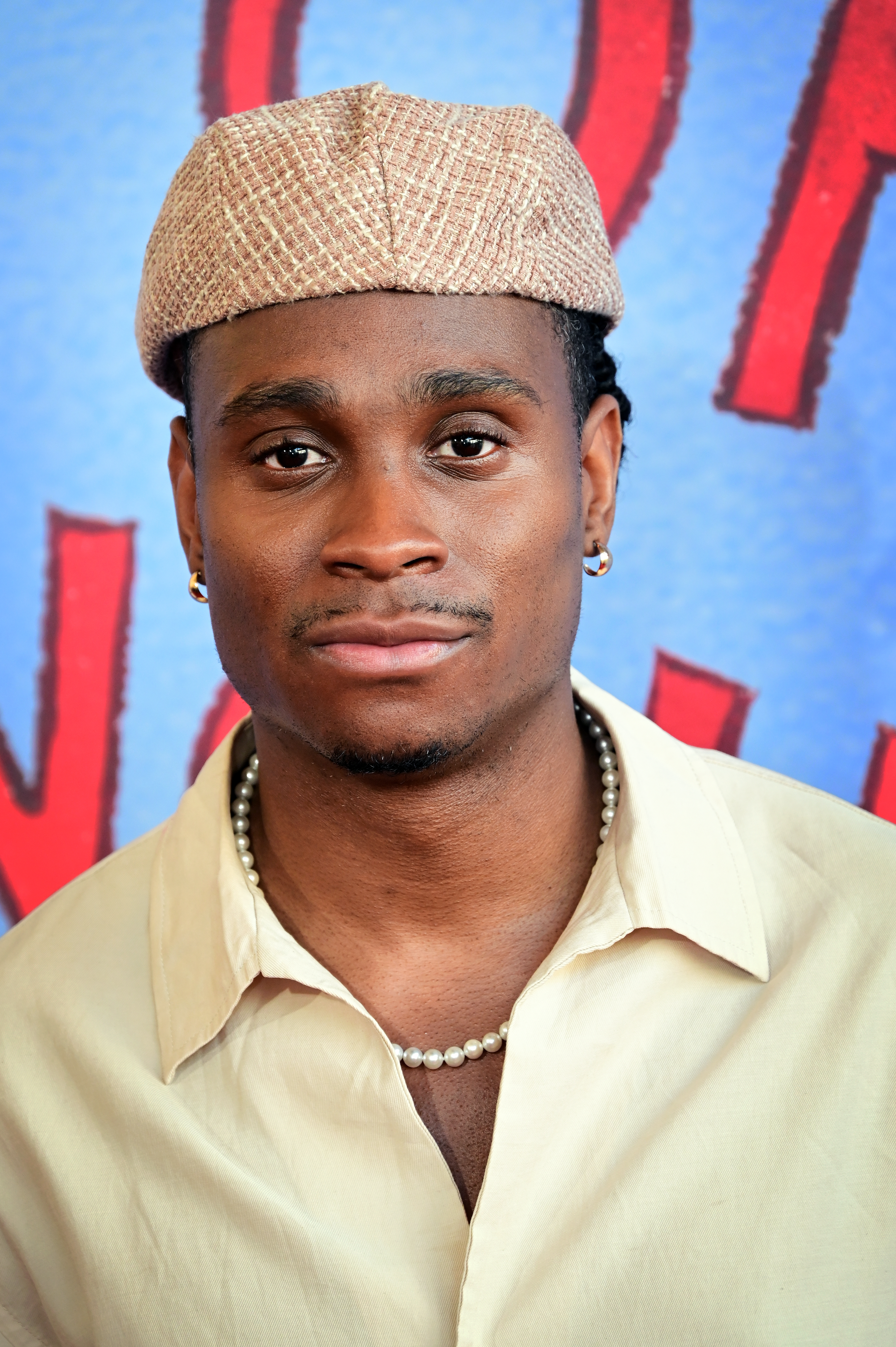
- Cooper in 2026
- Occupations: Playwright; actor; director

Jordan E. Cooper (born 1995) is an American playwright, actor, and director. He is best known for his Broadway play Ain't No Mo' (2022), and for creating and executive producing The Ms. Pat Show. He was also listed as "Forbes 30 Under 30" in 2024.

== Career ==
Cooper made his Broadway debut with Ain't No Mo', a satirical play which was nominated for six Tony Awards and won an Obie Award; it made him the youngest Black American playwright on Broadway, and the youngest Black American playwright nominated for a Tony Award.

He is the creator, show runner, and executive producer of the Emmy Award-nominated sitcom The Ms. Pat Show. He also played MC Tyrone on the third season of the FX show Pose. Other works by Cooper include Black Boy Fly, and Mama Got a Cough which The New York Times hailed as "The Best Theater of 2020".

== Credits ==
=== Theatre ===
Year	Title	Role	Venue	Ref.
2019	Ain't No Mo'	Peaches	The Public Theater, Off-Broadway	
2022	Ain't No Mo'	Peaches	Belasco Theatre, Broadway	
2024	Oh Happy Day!	Keyshawn	Baltimore Center Stage, Baltimore	
2025	Oh Happy Day!	Keyshawn	The Public Theater, Off-Broadway	

=== Television ===
Year	Title	Role	Notes	Ref.
2018–2019	Star	—N/a	Writer; 18 episodes	
2021–present	The Ms. Pat Show	—N/a	Creator / executive producer; 38 episodes	
2021	Pose	Tyrone	2 episodes	

=== Film ===
Year	Title	Role	Notes	Ref.
2025	Freakier Friday	Jett		

== Awards and nominations ==
Year	Association	Category	Project	Result	Ref.
2023	Tony Awards	Best Play	Ain't No Mo'	Nominated	
2023	Tony Awards	Featured Actor in a Play	Ain't No Mo'	Nominated	
2026	Lambda Literary Awards	LGBTQ+ Drama	Ain't No Mo'	Won	
