= Ain't No Mo' =

2019 play by Jordan E. Cooper

- Playbill cover featuring Ain't No Mo'
- Original language: English
- Written by: Jordan E. Cooper

Premiere
- Date: March 27, 2019
- Place: The Public Theater, New York City

Ain't No Mo' is a play consisting of a series of sketch comedy-style vignettes written by Jordan E. Cooper. The premise of the play is set in an alternate present where the United States government has put forward a program to buy every Black person in America, who wishes, a one-way ticket to Africa. The vignettes portray how this program affects various characters and the people around them.

The show is notable for it making Cooper the youngest Black American to make his Broadway playwriting debut, at age 27, and the youngest Black American playwright nominated for a Tony Award.

== Plot ==
On November 4, 2008, Pastor Freeman performs a funeral service for "Righttocomplain", claiming that with the election of Barack Obama, the African-American community will no longer face hardships. However, the congregation's joyous celebration is undercut by the years that follow as they witness events such as the Flint water crisis and the deaths of unarmed Black Americans at the hands of police.

A Black drag queen flight agent, Peaches, prepares a boarding gate at the airport while giving instructions over the phone to her friend Ladarius. As the play continues, it is revealed the flight is the last one in a program of government subsidized one-way tickets to Africa for all Black people who want it. The play frequently cuts back to Peaches at the gate, checking in various passengers and offering counsel to those who are hesitant. She also prepares Miss Bag, a suitcase she claims holds "our entire story as a people in this country" and encourages passengers to drop their stories in the bag so they may bring it to Africa. She also warns that all black people who elect not to board the flight will be subjected to "extreme racial transmogrification" by "The Powers That Be": they will be turned into white people.

The rest of the play consists of vignettes showing the lives of black people in different settings, and how news of the flight affects them. In the first vignette, a black couple Damien and Trisha wait for her number to be called at an abortion clinic; Damien is actually a ghost after being killed in an act of police brutality, and Trisha sees the abortion as the only way to keep their child safe from both death and the spectacle of being a symbol of police brutality. The second vignette depicts the filming of The Real Baby Mamas of the South-Side, a reality show focused on stereotypical black women; brief moments where the camera stops rolling reveal the artificial nature of the show, as well as tensions among the cast due to the presence of "Rachonda" (Rachel), a self-proclaimed "transracial" black woman who is the only one who keeps up the stereotype when the camera are not rolling. In the third segment, a rich black family ignore the notice about the last flight, only to be confronted by the arrival of Black, the human personification of their family's "blackness", locked away in the basement by the family's deceased patriarch forty years prior when he became rich. In the last vignette, three inmates at a women's prison, along with one of the officers, prepare to be released so that they may board the planes while dealing with their complex feelings of what their new "freedom" entails.

In the final scene, Peaches finishes getting all the passengers on the plane, but just as she is ready to board herself, she discovers she is unable to move Miss Bag. She tries to get it to move, protesting that leaving it behind means leaving behind all of African-American culture and history. Due to her efforts, the last plane leaves without her. Realizing that Miss Bag has disappeared, Peaches angrily protests to The Powers That Be to "give it back" as her drag is violently removed until she is left as a man. Before he is subjected to extreme racial transmogrification, he makes one last attempt to rally black solidarity to get back Miss Bag and thus reclaim African-American identity, but is met with silence—for there are no more Black people left.

== Productions ==
=== Off-Broadway (2019) ===
The show debuted Off-Broadway on March 27, 2019, at the Public Theatre.

=== Broadway (2022) ===
Broadway performances began previews November 9, 2022 ahead of a December 1 opening, at the Belasco Theatre starring Cooper, Marchánt Davis, Fedna Jacquet, Crystal Lucas-Perry, Ebony Marshall-Oliver and Shannon Matesky. The production was directed by Stevie Walker-Webb and featured sets by Scott Pask, lighting by Adam Honoré, costumes by Emilio Sosa, sound by Jonathan Deans and Taylor J. Williams, and hair/makeup/wigs by Mia M. Neal and Kirk Cambridge Del-Pesche. The production closed on December 23, running a total of 28 performances.

=== Other productions ===
There were also productions in Washington D.C. at Woolly Mammoth Theatre Company and at Baltimore Center Stage in October 2022.

== Cast and characters ==
Character	Off-Broadway	Broadway
Character	2019	2022
Peaches	Jordan E. Cooper	Jordan E. Cooper
Passenger No. 2	Marchánt Davis	Marchánt Davis
Passenger No. 1	Fedna Jacquet	Fedna Jacquet
Passenger No. 5	Crystal Lucas-Perry	Crystal Lucas-Perry
Passenger No. 4	Ebony Marshall-Oliver	Ebony Marshall-Oliver
Passenger No. 3	Simone Recasner	Shannon Matesky

== Awards and nominations ==
Ain't No Mo' won the 2026 Lambda Literary Award for Drama.

=== 2022 Broadway production ===
Year	Award	Category	Nominee	Result
2023	Drama League Awards	Distinguished Performance	Jordan E. Cooper	Nominated
2023	Tony Awards	Best Play	Jordan E. Cooper	Nominated
2023	Tony Awards	Best Featured Actor in a Play	Jordan E. Cooper	Nominated
2023	Tony Awards	Best Featured Actress in a Play	Crystal Lucas-Perry	Nominated
2023	Tony Awards	Best Costume Design of a Play	Emilio Sosa	Nominated
2023	Tony Awards	Best Sound Design of a Play	Jonathan Deans and Taylor Williams	Nominated
2023	Tony Awards	Best Direction of a Play	Stevie Walker-Webb	Nominated
