= Scott Lehrer =

Sound designer

Scott Lehrer is a sound designer and audio engineer.

== Awards ==
Lehrer won a Tony Award for Best Sound Design in 2008, for South Pacific.
