= Helen Park =

American musical theatre writer (born 1986)

Background information
- Born: Hyunjung Park; March 23, 1986 (age 40); Busan, South Korea
- Occupations: Composer, lyricist, orchestrator, musician
- Website: www.helenparkmusic.com
- Education: New York University (MFA)

Helen Park (born Hyunjung Park, March 23, 1986) is a South Korean-born composer based in New York City. She is a 2018 Lucille Lortel Award Winner and the recipient of the 2018 Richard Rodgers Award. Best known for her score on the musical KPOP, Park was nominated for Best Original Score at the Tony Awards, as well as three Drama Desk Awards.

== Biography ==
Park was born in Busan, South Korea, and moved to Canada in her third year of middle school. She attended New York University where she received her MFA in Musical Theatre Writing from the Tisch School of the Arts. Park is also an alumna of the BMI Lehman Engel Musical Theatre Workshop.

== Work ==
Park is a composer-lyricist, music producer and orchestrator for the Broadway musical KPOP. She is the first Asian female composer/lyricist for a Broadway play and the first to be nominated for a Tony Award. She is also the first Asian female writer to be nominated for a Tony in any writing category.

Park is a songwriter for Over the Moon, a Netflix musical animated feature film directed by Glen Keane, which was released on October 23, 2020.

Park composed the musical adaptation of Itaewon Class, which premiered in Tokyo in 2025.

== Awards and nominations ==
Award/Nomination	Category	Nominated work	Result	Year
Annie Awards	Outstanding Music in a Feature Production	Over the Moon	Nominated	2020
Satellite Awards	Best Original Song	Rocket to the Moon from Over the Moon	Nominated	2020
Drama Desk Awards	Best Musical	KPOP	Nominated	2018
Drama Desk Awards	Outstanding Music	KPOP	Nominated	2018
Drama Desk Awards	Outstanding Lyrics	KPOP	Nominated	2018
Richard Rodgers Award	Musical Theater	KPOP	Won	2018
Lucille Lortel Awards	Best Musical	KPOP	Won	2018
Drama League Award	Best Musical	KPOP	Nominated	2018
Off-Broadway Alliance Award	Unique Theatrical Experience	KPOP	Won	2018
Tony Awards	Best Original Score	KPOP	Nominated	2023

== See also ==
- Koreans in New York City
