= KPOP (musical) =

2017 musical about the K-pop industry

- Playbill for the Broadway production
- Music: Helen Park; Max Vernon
- Lyrics: Helen Park; Max Vernon
- Book: Jason Kim
- Basis: K-pop
- Premiere: September 5, 2017: Ars Nova, Midtown Manhattan, New York City
- Productions: 2017 Off-Broadway; 2022 Broadway
- Awards: Lucille Lortel Award for Outstanding Musical

KPOP is a Broadway musical with a book by Jason Kim and music and lyrics by Helen Park and Max Vernon. The musical originally premiered off-Broadway at Ars Nova in Manhattan in September 2017. The Broadway production premiered on November 20, 2022, and featured several K-pop idols in the cast, including Luna, Kevin Woo, Kim Bo-hyung, and Min. Despite the show's early closure in December 2022, the production received three nominations at the 76th Tony Awards.

== Synopsis ==
Although the Broadway production of KPOP features many of the songs and characters from the off-Broadway production, the two versions follow distinctly different plots: the Broadway production has been characterized by the creative team as being more of a "reinvention" than a transfer of the off-Broadway version.

=== Off-Broadway (2017) ===
The show casts audiences as American executives touring JTM Entertainment, a K-pop music factory run by Moon and his wife Ruby, who are trying to break into the North American market with the help of a Korean American agent named Jerry. Audience members toured the multilevel, multiroom facility (in actuality the A.R.T./New York Theatres building in Hell's Kitchen) where they observe rehearsals by the bands F8 and Special K, as well as JTM's flagship star MwE. Audiences also encounter the in-house plastic surgeon Dr. Park, the vocal coach Yazmeen, and a ruthless dance instructor named Jenn. Throughout the evening, the audience observes the JTM artists as they are put through the wringer of the idol industry, from demanding rehearsals, to cultivating fandom via social media, to receiving media training, and having to confront body dysmorphia through a rhinoplasty examination to find any facial imperfections. Specific plotlines include Korean-American member Epic trying to embrace the attempt to break into American pop culture against the wishes of other members of F8, and MwE facing the possibility of being replaced as JTM's star by Sonoma, one of the younger members in the group Special K.

=== Broadway (2022) ===
==== Act 1 ====
The show is framed as a camera rehearsal for South Korean music agency RBY Entertainment’s New York debut of its stars, at Circle in the Square Theatre on Broadway. RBY’s founder and chief executive, a former K-pop singer named Ruby, discusses logistics with the director Harry as she rehearses the introduction. The two groups, RTMIS and F8, perform the opening number with the song "This is My Korea 우리 이야기." RBY’s main star, MwE, starts to perform her song "엎드려 Up Du Ryuh (Bow Down)" but becomes spooked upon seeing Ruby in the audience and flees.

While Ruby goes to confront MwE, Harry has F8 rehearse their introductions to the camera, but finds their simple introductions in Korean boring. New member Brad, a mixed race Korean-American who replaced another member, tries to make his mark by coming up with a hammy intro in English, but quickly comes into conflict with the rest of the group over whether to introduce themselves in Korean or English, particularly bandleader Jun Hyuk. F8 performs their song "한국놈 Han Guk Nom (Korean Man)" but intentionally change up the choreography on Brad as revenge for his outburst. Harry begins using the cameras to spy on Ruby, MwE, and MwE’s boyfriend Juny in the dressing room. MwE reveals she thought she saw her mother in the audience, and with Juny’s encouragement voices that she wishes to quit RBY.

The action flashes back to MwE’s original audition for RBY, as 9-year old Mina Kim, as she performs "Still I Love You 아직도 사랑해", explaining that she wishes to become a singer to support her mother after her father left. Ruby, the original singer of the song, sees potential in MwE and immediately signs her on. In the present, Harry sees an opportunity to turn the concert film into a documentary about the K-pop industry. He tries to get RTMIS, the girl group, to spill on their careers in B-roll as they rehearse their song "Perfect 완벽한 걸." The group refuses, as all interviews need to be vetted by Ruby, and they face severe consequences if anything they say affects the image of RBY’s brand.

In another flashback, a 13-year old MwE struggles to get through a dance rehearsal for her song "Wind Up Doll 태엽인형" after her mother abandoned her on her recent birthday. Ruby encourages her to push through the pain of her home life and focus on the image she shows to the rest of the world. In the present, Brad asks Harry to redo the footage for "Han Guk Nom". Harry pushes him to spill on the rest of the group bullying him. Brad is reluctant, but eventually relates his personal experiences growing up as the child of a Korean mother and being bullied in school for his identity, and how his treatment by the rest of F8 reminds him of that. Harry has Brad perform an original song he wrote inspired by his experiences, "Halfway 중간 지점". In another flashback, backstage at a performance, 18-year old MwE confronts Ruby over the slow progress in her career and the fact that Ruby has begun recruiting for a new boy band (F8), interpreting it as Ruby gearing up to replace her. Ruby reminds her that the path to stardom takes a long time, but it will be worth it in the end. As MwE performs "슈펴스타 Super Star" she sees crowds of fans cheering for her.

==== Act 2 ====
RTMIS performs "시간 낭비 Shi Gan Nang Bee (Waste of Time)", a song about ending relationships. Harry once again asks them about filming B-roll, only for Ruby to intervene and remind Harry it is forbidden. In a flashback to three months before the rehearsal, MwE writes a song "벙어리새 Bung Uh Ree Sae (Mute Bird)" with her childhood friend and boyfriend Juny, in response to the recent death of her mother. He encourages her to record it, as it is different from the pre-written material Ruby makes her do. A talented musician himself, Juny prefers his simple life as a music teacher to MwE’s busy touring schedules, and they are only able to meet for short periods at a time and in secrecy. MwE, desperate to keep Juny in her life, proposes to him just as Ruby walks in. A scandalized Ruby reminds MwE that she has a specific brand to follow, and Juny does not fit that brand. MwE refuses to keep working for RBY if Juny can’t be present, so Ruby reluctantly allows him to join her on tour on the condition Ruby also manages every aspect of his daily life.

The tensions among F8 come to a head as they prepare to rehearse "Amerika (Checkmate) 아메리카" particularly when Harry has the cameras focus on Brad. Jun Hyuk finally explodes that he feels Brad has not earned his place among the group, most of whom have had to train for years whereas Brad was hired to replace one of their friends without going through the same training. Brad retorts that he was hired for his talent, same as the rest of the group, and that they have only excluded him because of his American identity and poor grasp on the Korean language. Jae Ik admits that Brad has a point, and points out that Jun Hyuk can’t fault Brad for being American, as several members of the group are also from America (including Jae Ik himself, hailing from Queens). The other members accuse Harry of trying to push conflict for his documentary, and encourage Jun Hyuk and Brad to make-up before they rehearse the song.

In a flashback to a week before the camera rehearsal, MwE tries to get Ruby to listen to the song she wrote, but Ruby refuses to market MwE as a singer-songwriter. MwE begins expressing doubts about making her debut in New York as RTMIS arrives to rehearse. Ruby tells RTMIS that if MwE refuses to perform, the whole performance will be cancelled. Several members of RTMIS start voicing frustration that the work they have put into their careers could be thrown away so easily. One of the members, Sonoma, reminds the rest of the group how important getting to perform alongside one of their idols, MwE, will be, and that they must put in the effort to fulfill their lifelong dreams.

Just as Ruby and MwE’s argument backstage hits a breaking point, they finally notice the camera operator and discover Harry’s scheme. Ruby promptly fires Harry, who protests he could have helped MwE by making her human to the rest of the world, instead of the machine Ruby has made her. Faced with what her life has become, MwE declares that she wants to quit and leave with Juny. Ruby apologizes for not being encouraging or a strong replacement for her mother, but reminds her cancelling the whole performance would jeopardize the careers of everyone at RBY, including the members of F8 and RTMIS. MwE suggests Juny could come with her, but he refuses, reiterating that he can’t live the rigorous, controlled touring life, and they will have to end the relationship if she stays with RBY. Ruby, softened by the entire ordeal, offers MwE two options on the condition that she performs at least one more time: to stay with the company, or leave and try to live a normal life with Juny. MwE’s decision is left ambiguous.

Rather than film the performance, Ruby turns RBY’s planned debut in New York City into a concert, featuring performances by RTMIS ("Supergoddess 슈퍼가디스" and "Gin & Tonic 진 앤 토닉"), F8 ("Meant 2 B 멘 투 비" and "흔들어 Hun Du Ruh (Shake It)"), and MwE ("Phoenix 불사조"). Finally, all of the RBY artists come together to perform "Blast Off 발사".

== Musical numbers ==
=== Off-Broadway ===
- "This Is My Korea" - Company
- "Wind Up Doll" - MwE
- "Bung Uh Ree Sae" - MwE and Sonoma
- "Ping Pong" - Special K
- "Starlight" - F8
- "Sae Nam Ja" - F8
- "Shopaholic" - Special K
- "Fuck Love (Sonoma)" - Sonoma
- "Phoenix" - MwE
- "Kpopsicle" - F8
- "Amerika (Checkmate)" - F8
- "Gin & Tonic" - Special K
- "Blast Off" - Company

=== Broadway ===
Act 1

- "This is My Korea 우리 이야기" - RBY Artists
- "엎드려 Up Du Ryuh (Bow Down)" - MwE
- "한국놈 Han Guk Nom (Korean Man)" - F8
- "Still I Love You 아직도 사랑해" - MwE
- "Perfect 완벽한 걸" - RTMIS
- "Wind Up Doll 태엽인형" - MwE
- "Halfway 중간 지점" - Brad
- "슈펴스타 Super Star" - MwE

Act 2

- "시간 낭비 Shi Gan Nang Bee (Waste of Time)" - RTMIS
- "벙어리새 Bung Uh Ree Sae (Mute Bird)" - MwE
- "Amerika (Checkmate) 아메리카" - F8
- "Supergoddess 슈퍼가디스" - RTMIS
- "Gin & Tonic 진 앤 토닉" - RTMIS
- "Meant 2 B 멘 투 비" - F8
- "흔들어 Hun Du Ruh (Shake It)" - F8
- "Phoenix 불사조" - MwE
- "Blast Off 발사" - RBY Artists

For the Broadway production, "Ping Pong" was turned into "Perfect 완벽한 걸", "Sae Nam Ja" was rewritten into "한국놈 Han Guk Nom (Korean Man)", and "Kpopsicle" became ""흔들어 Hun Du Ruh (Shake It)". Several cut songs from the off-Broadway production, including "Shopaholic" and "Fuck Love (Sonoma)", were reused as pre-show music for the Broadway production.

== Productions ==
KPOP made its world premiere off-Broadway at the A.R.T/NY Theatre space, produced by Ars Nova, on September 5, 2017. The production ran until October 21. The musical's book was by Jason Kim, direction by Teddy Bergman, choreography by Jennifer Weber, and immersive design by Woodshed Collective. The production was produced in association with Ma-Yi Theater Company and Woodshed Collective.

Following multiple delays due to casting issues and the COVID-19 pandemic, including a cancelled pre-Broadway run at the Signature Theatre in Virginia, the musical made its Broadway debut in November 20, 2022 at Circle in the Square Theatre. The Broadway production featured Luna in the starring role, along with fellow K-pop stars Kevin Woo, Min-Young Lee, and Kim Bohyung. The production reunites the creative team from the Ars Nova run. On December 6, 2022, it was announced that the show would close on December 11 after 44 previews and 17 performances, with the final performance paying tribute to the AAPI community and a panel discussion to follow. Months after its closure, the show was recognized with three nominations at the 76th Tony Awards, including Best Costume Design in a Musical, Best Choreography and Best Original Score, with co-composer Helen Park becoming the first Asian woman to be nominated in the category.

== Cast ==
Character	Ars Nova (2017)	Broadway (2022)
Special K/RTMIS
Riya	—N/a	Min
Tiny D	Katie Lee Hill	Bohyung Kim
Miyeon	—N/a	Kate Mina Lin
Ivy	—N/a	Amy Keum
Sonoma	Julia Abueva	Julia Abueva
XO	Deborah Kim	—N/a
Mina	Susannah Kim	—N/a
Jin Hee	Cathy Ang	—N/a
Callie	Sun Hye Park	—N/a
F8
Lex	Jiho Kang	Jiho Kang
Danny	—N/a	John Yi
Timmy X	Joomin Hwang	Joshua Lee
Jun Hyuk	—N/a	Kevin Woo
Jae Ik	—N/a	Abraham Lim
Sky	—N/a	Eddy Lee
Wooyeon	—N/a	James Kho
Brad	—N/a	Zachary Noah Piser
Epic	Jason Tam	—N/a
Oracle	Jinwoo Jung	—N/a
Bobo	John Yi	—N/a
Other
MwE	Ashley Park	Luna
Harry	—N/a	Aubie Merrylees
Ruby	Vanessa Kai	Jully Lee
Camera Operator	—N/a	Major Curda
Juny	—N/a	Jinwoo Jung
Yazmeen	Amanda Morton	—N/a
Moon	James Saito	—N/a
Jerry	James Seol	—N/a
Dr. Park	David Shih	—N/a
Jenn	Ebony Williams	—N/a

== Awards and nominations ==
=== Original off-Broadway production (2017) ===
Year	Award Ceremony	Category	Nominee	Result
2018	Drama Desk Awards	Outstanding Musical		Nominated
2018	Drama Desk Awards	Outstanding Director	Teddy Bergman	Nominated
2018	Drama Desk Awards	Outstanding Music	Helen Park, Max Vernon	Nominated
2018	Drama Desk Awards	Outstanding Lyrics	Helen Park, Max Vernon	Nominated
2018	Drama Desk Awards	Outstanding Actress in a Musical	Ashley Park	Nominated
2018	Drama Desk Awards	Outstanding Lighting Design for a Musical	Jeanette Oi-Suk Yew	Nominated
2018	Drama Desk Awards	Outstanding Sound Design in a Musical	Will Pickens	Nominated
2018	Lucille Lortel Awards	Outstanding Musical		Won
2018	Lucille Lortel Awards	Outstanding Choreographer	Jennifer Weber	Nominated
2018	Lucille Lortel Awards	Outstanding Lead Actor in a Musical	James Seol	Nominated
2018	Lucille Lortel Awards	Outstanding Lead Actress in a Musical	Ashley Park	Won
2018	Lucille Lortel Awards	Outstanding Featured Actor in a Musical	Jason Tam	Won
2018	Lucille Lortel Awards	Outstanding Featured Actress in a Musical	Vanessa Kai	Nominated
2018	Lucille Lortel Awards	Outstanding Scenic Design	Gabriel Hainer Evansohn	Nominated
2018	Lucille Lortel Awards	Outstanding Costume Design	Tricia Barsamian	Nominated
2018	Lucille Lortel Awards	Outstanding Lighting Design	Jeanette Oi-Suk Yew	Nominated
2018	Drama League Awards	Outstanding Production of a Broadway or Off-Broadway Musical		Nominated
2018	Drama League Awards	Distinguished Performance Award	Ashley Park (also for Mean Girls)	Nominated

=== Original Broadway production (2022) ===
Year	Award	Category	Nominee	Result
2023	Tony Awards	Best Original Score	Helen Park and Max Vernon	Nominated
2023	Tony Awards	Best Costume Design of a Musical	Clint Ramos and Sophia Choi	Nominated
2023	Tony Awards	Best Choreography	Jennifer Weber	Nominated
2023	Drama Desk Awards	Outstanding Costume Design of a Musical	Clint Ramos and Sophia Choi	Nominated
2023	Drama Desk Awards	Outstanding Choreography	Jennifer Weber	Nominated

== See also ==
- Korean culture in New York City
- Koreans in New York City
