= Drama Desk Award for Outstanding Lighting Design =

Annual New York theatre award

- Awarded for: Outstanding Lighting Design
- Location: New York City
- Country: United States
- Presented by: Drama Desk
- First award: 1975
- Final award: 2015
- Website: dramadesk.org (defunct)

The Drama Desk Award for Outstanding Lighting Design was an annual award presented by Drama Desk in recognition of achievements in the theatre across collective Broadway, off-Broadway and off-off-Broadway productions in New York City. The award was first presented in 1975, for work in either a play or musical production. It was briefly retired, when it was replaced in 2009 by separate play and musical categories, but returned as a singular category starting in 2010. It was permanently retired after the 2015 presentation, again replaced by separate play and musical categories.

== Winners and nominees ==
Key

and bold indicates the winner.

=== 1970s ===
Year	Designer	Production
1975
1975	**Neil Peter Jampolis**	**Sherlock Holmes**
1975	Feder	Goodtime Charley
1975	Roger Morgan	Saturday Sunday Monday
1975	Julia Trevelyan Oman	Brief Lives
1975	Andy Phillips	Equus
1976
1976	**Jules Fisher**	**Chicago**
1976	Ian Calderon	Trelawny of the 'Wells'
1976	Leon DiLeone	Angel Street
1976	Robert Ornbo	Travesties
1976	Thomas R. Skelton	Legend
1976	James Tilton	A Memory of Two Mondays / 27 Wagons Full of Cotton
1976	James Tilton	They Knew What They Wanted
1977
1977	**Jennifer Tipton**	**The Cherry Orchard**
1977	**Jennifer Tipton**	**For Colored Girls Who Have Considered Suicide / When the Rainbow Is Enuf**
1977	John Bury	No Man's Land
1977	Burl Hash	The Crazy Locomotive
1977	Gilbert V. Hemsley, Jr.	Porgy and Bess
1977	Ron Wallace	Comedians
1978
1978	**Jules Fisher**	**Dancin'**
1978	John Arnone and Garland Wright	K
1978	Gilbert V. Hemsley, Jr.	The Mighty Gents
1978	Roger Morgan	Dracula
1978	Ronald Wallace	The Gin Game
1978	Marc B. Weiss	Deathtrap
1979
1979	**Roger Morgan**	**The Crucifer of Blood**
1979	Ken Billington	Sweeney Todd: The Demon Barber of Fleet Street
1979	Beverly Emmons	The Elephant Man
1979	Tharon Musser	Ballroom
1979	Tharon Musser	They're Playing Our Song

=== 1980s ===
Year	Designer	Production
1980
1980	**Dennis Parichy**	**Talley's Folly**
1980	David Hersey	Evita
1980	John McLain	Émigrés
1980	Tharon Musser	Children of a Lesser God
1980	Richard Nelson	Morning's at Seven
1980	Duane Schuler	Teibele and Her Demon
1981
1981	**Jules Fisher and Robby Monk**	**Frankenstein**
1981	John Bury	Amadeus
1981	Pat Collins	Penguin Touquet
1981	Dennis Parichy	Fifth of July
1981	Thomas R. Skelton	Lena Horne: The Lady and Her Music
1981	Jennifer Tipton	Lunch Hour
1982
1982	**Marcia Madeira**	**Nine**
1982	**Tharon Musser**	**Dreamgirls**
1982	Beverly Emmons	The Dresser
1982	Eugene Lee	The Hothouse
1983
1983	**David Hersey**	**Cats**
1983	Ken Billington	Foxfire
1983	Allen Lee Hughes	K2
1983	Richard Nelson	Death of Von Richthofen Witnessed from Earth
1983	Mal Sturchio	Johnny Got His Gun
1984
1984	**Richard Nelson**	**Sunday in the Park with George**
1984	Frances Aronson	Painting Churches
1984	Jules Fisher	La Cage aux Folles
1984	John Gisondi	Sound and Beauty
1984	Tharon Musser	The Real Thing
1984	Marc B. Weiss	The Rink
1985
1985	**Richard Riddell**	**Big River**
1985	Ken Billington	Grind
1985	Kevin Rigdon	Balm in Gilead
1985	Jennifer Tipton	Whoopi Goldberg
1985	Ron Wallace	Requiem for a Heavyweight
1985	Terry Wuthrich	Tracers
1986
1986	**Pat Collins**	**Execution of Justice**
1986	Paul Gallo	The Mystery of Edwin Drood
1986	Phil Monat	Goblin Market
1986	Kevin Rigdon	The Shawl
1986	Jennifer Tipton	Hamlet
1987
1987	**Chris Parry**	**Les Liaisons Dangereuses**
1987	Martin Aronstein	Wild Honey
1987	David Hersey	Les Misérables
1987	Dennis Parichy	Coastal Disturbances
1987	Jennifer Tipton	Worstward Ho
1988
1988	**Andrew Bridge**	**The Phantom of the Opera**
1988	Pat Collins	Woman in Mind
1988	Paul Gallo	Wenceslas Square
1988	Paul Gallo	Anything Goes
1988	David Hersey	Chess
1988	Richard Nelson	Into the Woods
1989
1989	**Jennifer Tipton**	**Waiting for Godot**
1989	**Jennifer Tipton**	**Jerome Robbins' Broadway**
1989	**Jennifer Tipton**	**Long Day's Journey into Night**
1989	Mary Jo Dondlinger	Sweeney Todd: The Demon Barber of Fleet Street
1989	Paul Gallo	Miracolo D'Amore
1989	Paul Gallo	Lend Me a Tenor
1989	Neil Peter Jampolis and Jane Reisman	Black and Blue
1989	Kevin Rigdon	Our Town

=== 1990s ===
Year	Designer	Production
1990
1990	**Jules Fisher**	**Grand Hotel**
1990	Andrew Bridge	Aspects of Love
1990	Paul Gallo	City of Angels
1990	Tharon Musser	Artist Descending a Staircase
1990	Kevin Rigdon	The Grapes of Wrath
1991
1991	**David Hersey**	**Miss Saigon**
1991	Jules Fisher	Hamlet
1991	Donald Holder	Caucasian Chalk Circle
1991	Tharon Musser	The Secret Garden
1991	Kenneth Posner	Machinal
1992
1992	**Jules Fisher**	**Jelly's Last Jam**
1992	**Paul Gallo**	**Guys and Dolls**
1992	Christopher Akerlind	Mad Forest
1992	Trevor Dawson	Dancing at Lughnasa
1992	Mimi Jordan Sherin	'Tis Pity She's a Whore
1993
1993	**Chris Parry**	**The Who's Tommy**
1993	Robert Christen	Wings
1993	Jules Fisher	Angels in America: Millennium Approaches
1993	Brian MacDevitt	Three Hotels
1993	Mimi Jordan Sherin	Woyzeck
1994
1994	**Rick Fisher**	**An Inspector Calls**
1994	Christopher Akerlind	The Lights
1994	Beverly Emmons	Passion
1994	Paul Pyant	Carousel
1994	Mimi Jordan Sherin	All's Well That Ends Well
1995
1995	**Richard Pilbrow**	**Show Boat**
1995	Beverly Emmons	The Heiress
1995	Paul Gallo	Blade to the Heart
1995	Mark Henderson	Indiscretions
1995	Brian MacDevitt	Love! Valour! Compassion!
1996
1996	**Peggy Eisenhauer and Jules Fisher**	**Bring in 'Da Noise, Bring in 'Da Funk**
1996	Beverly Emmons and Jules Fisher	Chronicle of a Death Foretold
1996	Nigel Levings	The King and I
1996	Chris Parry	A Midsummer Night's Dream
1997
1997	**Ken Billington**	**Chicago**
1997	Kevin Adams	Henry VI
1997	Donald Holder	Juan Darien
1997	Jean Kalman	The Waste Land
1997	Richard Pilbrow	The Life
1998
1998	**Donald Holder**	**The Lion King**
1998	Paul Anderson	The Chairs
1998	Mike Baldassari and Peggy Eisenhauer	Cabaret
1998	Peggy Eisenhauer and Jules Fisher	Ragtime
1998	Peter Maradudin	Ballad of Yachiyo
1998	Kenneth Posner	Pride's Crossing
1998	Kenneth Posner	A View from the Bridge
1999
1999	**Chris Parry**	**Not About Nightingales**
1999	Howell Binkley	Parade
1999	Michael Chybowski	Wit
1999	Paul Gallo	The Civil War
1999	Natasha Katz	Twelfth Night
1999	Mimi Jordan Sherin	Bob

=== 2000s ===
Year	Designer	Production
2000
2000	**Peter Kaczorowski**	**Contact**
2000	David J. Lander	Dirty Blonde
2000	Brian MacDevitt	An Experiment with an Air Pump
2000	Robert Perry	The Water Engine
2000	Kenneth Posner	The Wild Party
2000	Scott Zielinski	Space
2001
2001	**Paul Anderson**	**Mnemonic**
2001	Howell Binkley	The Full Monty
2001	Peter Kaczorowski	The Producers
2001	Brian MacDevitt	The Invention of Love
2001	Kenneth Posner	The Adventures of Tom Sawyer
2001	Hugh Vanstone	The Unexpected Man
2002
2002	**T.J. Gerckens**	**Metamorphoses**
2002	Frances Aronson	Psych
2002	David Hersey	Oklahoma!
2002	Natasha Katz	Sweet Smell of Success
2002	Peter Mumford	Private Lives
2002	Kenneth Posner	Monster
2003
2003	**Nigel Levings**	**La Bohème**
2003	Kevin Adams	Take Me Out
2003	Russell H. Champa	Yellowman
2003	Donald Holder	Observe the Sons of Ulster Marching Towards the Somme
2003	Donald Holder	Movin' Out
2003	Peter Mumford	Vincent in Brixton
2004
2004	**Peggy Eisenhauer and Jules Fisher**	**Assassins**
2004	T.J. Gerckens	The Notebooks of Leonardo da Vinci
2004	Donald Holder	The Violet Hour
2004	David J. Lander	I Am My Own Wife
2004	Brian MacDevitt	Henry IV
2004	Kenneth Posner	Wicked
2005
2005	**Christopher Akerlind**	**The Light in the Piazza**
2005	Christopher Akerlind	Belle Époque
2005	Mark Henderson	Chitty Chitty Bang Bang
2005	Donald Holder	Gem of the Ocean
2005	R. Lee Kennedy	The Audience
2005	James Japhy Weideman	Frankenstein
2006
2006	**Richard G. Jones**	**Sweeney Todd: The Demon Barber of Fleet Street**
2006	Christopher Akerlind	Awake and Sing!
2006	Traci Klainer	The Asphalt Kiss
2006	Martin Labrecque	Rain
2006	John McKernon	The Trip to Bountiful
2006	Robert Wilson	Peer Gynt
2007
2007	**Brian MacDevitt, Kenneth Posner and Natasha Katz**	**The Coast of Utopia**
2007	Howell Binkley	LoveMusik
2007	Paul Gallo	Blackbird
2007	Mark Jonathan	Prometheus Bound
2007	James Japhy Weideman	Jack Goes Boating
2008
2008	**Kevin Adams**	**The 39 Steps**
2008	Ken Billington	Sunday in the Park with George
2008	Maruti Evans	Slaughterhouse-Five
2008	Donald Holder	South Pacific
2008	Natasha Katz	The Little Mermaid
2008	Keith Parham	Adding Machine
2009	—N/a	

=== 2010s ===
Year	Designer	Production
2010
2010	**Neil Austin**	**Red**
2010	Neil Austin	Hamlet
2010	Christian DeAngelis	Lizzie Borden
2010	Maruti Evans	John Ball's In the Heat of the Night
2010	Natasha Katz	The Addams Family
2010	Dane Laffery	The Boys in the Band
2011
2011	**David Lander**	**Bengal Tiger at the Baghdad Zoo**
2011	Jean Kalman	John Gabriel Borkman
2011	R. Lee Kennedy	See Rock City & Other Destinations
2011	Laura Mroczkowksi	Spy Garbo
2011	Ben Stanton	The Whipping Man
2011	David Weiner	A Small Fire
2012
2012	**Brian MacDevitt**	**Death of a Salesman**
2012	Kevin Adams	Carrie
2012	Neil Austin	Evita
2012	David Lander	One Arm
2012	Kenneth Posner	Death Takes a Holiday
2012	Paul Pyant	Richard III
2013
2013	**Justin Townsend**	**Here Lies Love**
2013	**Daniel Winters**	**The Man Who Laughs**
2013	Ken Billington	Chaplin: The Musical
2013	Jane Cox	Passion
2013	Kenneth Posner	Pippin
2013	Scott Zielinski	A Civil War Christmas
2014
2014	**Christopher Akerlind**	**Rocky the Musical**
2014	Jane Cox	Machinal
2014	David Lander	The Civil War
2014	Peter Mumford	King Lear
2014	Brian Tovar	Tamar of the River
2014	Japhy Weideman	Macbeth
2015
2015	**Paule Constable**	**The Curious Incident of the Dog in the Night-Time**
2015	Howell Binkley	Hamilton
2015	Paule Constable and David Plater	Wolf Hall Parts One & Two
2015	Maruti Evans	Deliverance
2015	Natasha Katz	The Iceman Cometh
2015	Ben Stanton	Our Lady of Kibeho

== See also ==
- Laurence Olivier Award for Best Lighting Design
- Tony Award for Best Lighting Design
