= 66th Tony Awards =

2012 US theatrical awards ceremony

- Cover of the Official Program for the 66th Annual Tony Awards
- Date: June 10, 2012
- Location: Beacon Theatre
- Hosted by: Neil Patrick Harris

Highlights
- Most wins: Once (8)
- Most nominations: Once (11)
- Website: tonyawards.com

Television/radio coverage
- Network: CBS
- Viewership: 6.0 million
- Produced by: Neil Patrick Harris; Ricky Kirshner; Glenn Weiss
- Directed by: Glenn Weiss

The 66th Annual Tony Awards was held on June 10, 2012, to recognize achievement in Broadway productions during the 2011–2012 season. The ceremony was held at the Beacon Theatre, and was broadcast live on CBS television.

With Neil Patrick Harris was the host of the ceremony, it marked the third time that Harris hosted the Tony Awards show. He previously hosted the show in 2009, 2011 and later in 2013. The original musical number that opened the show had Harris singing and dancing to "What If Life Were More Like Theatre?" with appearances by Patti LuPone, Amanda Seyfried, and Jesse Tyler Ferguson. The telecast had 6.01 million viewers (preliminary numbers), in contrast to the 2011 Tony Awards telecast, which had 6.950 million viewers.

Alan Menken's win for the Tony Award for Best Original Score for Newsies marked it his first win after three nominations. He was previously nominated for Beauty and the Beast (1994), The Little Mermaid (2008), Sister Act (2011).

The Special Tony Award for Lifetime Achievement in the Theatre has been awarded to Emanuel Azenberg. Bernadette Peters was presented with the Isabelle Stevenson Award and Special Tony Awards were given to Hugh Jackman and the Actors’ Equity Association. The Regional Theatre Tony Award has been awarded to the Shakespeare Theatre Company.

== Eligibility ==
Shows that opened on Broadway during the 2011–12 season before April 27, 2012 are eligible.

Original plays

- Chinglish
- Clybourne Park
- The Columnist
- End of the Rainbow
- The Lyons
- Magic/Bird
- The Mountaintop
- One Man, Two Guvnors
- Other Desert Cities
- Peter and the Starcatcher
- Relatively Speaking
- Seminar
- Stick Fly
- Venus in Fur

Original musicals

- Bonnie & Clyde
- Ghost
- Leap of Faith
- Lysistrata Jones
- Newsies
- Nice Work If You Can Get It
- Once
- Spider-Man: Turn Off the Dark

Play revivals

- Arthur Miller's Death of A Salesman
- Don't Dress for Dinner
- Gore Vidal's The Best Man
- Man and Boy
- Master Class
- Private Lives
- The Road to Mecca
- A Streetcar Named Desire
- Wit

Musical revivals

- Evita
- Follies
- Porgy & Bess
- Godspell
- Jesus Christ Superstar
- On a Clear Day You Can See Forever

== Ceremony ==
Neil Patrick Harris was the host of the ceremony. This marked the third time that Harris hosted the Tony Awards show.

The telecast had 6.01 million viewers (preliminary numbers), in contrast to the 2011 Tony Awards telecast, which had 6.950 million viewers.

== Performances ==
There were performances from musicals including Evita featuring Ricky Martin and Elena Roger, Follies, with Danny Burstein singing "Buddy's Blues" and introduced by Bernadette Peters, Ghost the Musical, Godspell, Hairspray (from a production on a Royal Caribbean ship), Jesus Christ Superstar, Leap of Faith with Raúl Esparza and company, Newsies featuring Jeremy Jordan and company, Nice Work If You Can Get It with Kelli O'Hara, Matthew Broderick and company, Once featuring Steve Kazee and company, and The Gershwins' Porgy and Bess featuring Audra McDonald and Norm Lewis. There also were performances from Tony-nominated plays, including End of the Rainbow with Tracie Bennett, One Man, Two Guvnors with James Corden, and Peter and the Starcatcher, with Christian Borle, Celia Keenan-Bolger and Adam Chanler-Berat.

The Book of Mormon cast members, along with Harris, started the show by singing a version of "Hello". The original musical number that opened the show had Harris singing and dancing to "What If Life Were More Like Theatre?" with Patti LuPone, Amanda Seyfried, Jesse Tyler Ferguson, and company. The closing musical number was "If I Had Time," sung by Harris. Both the opening and closing musical numbers were written by David Javerbaum and Adam Schlesinger.

=== Presenters ===
As announced on June 1, Angela Lansbury, Candice Bergen, Jessica Chastain, Jim Parsons, Christopher Plummer, Tyler Perry, Nick Jonas, Amanda Seyfried, Paul Rudd, Ellen Barkin, Bernadette Peters, James Marsden, Mandy Patinkin, and Sheryl Crow, among others, were presenters. On June 7, Matthew Morrison, Josh Groban, and Cote de Pablo were added to the presenter line-up. Other presenters included Patti LuPone, Trey Parker and Matt Stone.

=== Creative Arts awards ===
Several awards, named the "Creative Arts" awards, were presented prior to the main televised ceremony as well as during breaks. These included awards for: Best Lighting Design of a Play, Best Lighting Design of a Musical, Best Sound Design of a Play, Best Sound Design of a Musical, Best Costume Design of a Play, Best Costume Design of a Musical, Best Orchestrations, Best Scenic Design of a Play, Best Scenic Design of a Musical and Best Choreography. These awards were announced by Norbert Leo Butz and Beth Leavel.

== Nominees and winners ==
The nominees were announced on May 1, 2012. The winners were announced on June 10, 2012.

Best Play	Best Musical
Clybourne Park – Bruce Norris; Other Desert Cities – Jon Robin Baitz; Peter and the Starcatcher – Rick Elice; Venus in Fur – David Ives	Once; Leap of Faith; Newsies; Nice Work If You Can Get It
Best Revival of a Play	Best Revival of a Musical
Death of a Salesman; The Best Man; Master Class; Wit	Porgy and Bess; Evita; Follies; Jesus Christ Superstar
Best Actor in a Play	Best Actress in a Play
James Corden – One Man, Two Guvnors as Francis Henshall; Philip Seymour Hoffman – Death of a Salesman as Willy Loman; James Earl Jones – The Best Man as Art Hockstader; Frank Langella – Man and Boy as Gregor Antonescu; John Lithgow – The Columnist as Joseph Alsop	Nina Arianda – Venus in Fur as Vanda; Tracie Bennett – End of the Rainbow as Judy Garland; Stockard Channing – Other Desert Cities as Polly Wyeth; Linda Lavin – The Lyons as Rita Lyons; Cynthia Nixon – Wit as Vivian Bearing
Best Actor in a Musical	Best Actress in a Musical
Steve Kazee – Once as Guy; Danny Burstein – Follies as Buddy Plummer; Jeremy Jordan – Newsies as Jack Kelly; Norm Lewis – Porgy and Bess as Porgy; Ron Raines – Follies as Ben Stone	Audra McDonald – Porgy and Bess as Bess; Jan Maxwell – Follies as Phyllis Rogers Stone; Cristin Milioti – Once as Girl; Kelli O'Hara – Nice Work If You Can Get It as Billie Bendix; Laura Osnes – Bonnie & Clyde as Bonnie Parker
Best Featured Actor in a Play	Best Featured Actress in a Play
Christian Borle – Peter and the Starcatcher as The Black Stache; Michael Cumpsty – End of the Rainbow as Anthony; Tom Edden – One Man, Two Guvnors as Alfie; Andrew Garfield – Death of a Salesman as Biff Loman; Jeremy Shamos – Clybourne Park as Karl/Steve	Judith Light – Other Desert Cities as Silda Grauman; Linda Emond – Death of a Salesman as Linda Loman; Spencer Kayden – Don't Dress for Dinner as Suzette; Celia Keenan-Bolger – Peter and the Starcatcher as Molly; Condola Rashad – Stick Fly as Cheryl
Best Featured Actor in a Musical	Best Featured Actress in a Musical
Michael McGrath – Nice Work If You Can Get It as Cookie McGee; Phillip Boykin – Porgy and Bess as Crown; Michael Cerveris – Evita as Juan Perón; David Alan Grier – Porgy and Bess as Sporting Life; Josh Young – Jesus Christ Superstar as Judas	Judy Kaye – Nice Work If You Can Get It as Duchess Estonia Dulworth; Elizabeth A. Davis – Once as Réza; Jayne Houdyshell – Follies as Hattie Walker; Jessie Mueller – On a Clear Day You Can See Forever as Melinda Wells; Da’Vine Joy Randolph – Ghost the Musical as Oda Mae Brown
Best Book of a Musical	Best Original Score (Music and/or Lyrics) Written for the Theatre
Enda Walsh – Once; Douglas Carter Beane – Lysistrata Jones; Joe DiPietro – Nice Work If You Can Get It; Harvey Fierstein – Newsies	Newsies – Alan Menken (music) and Jack Feldman (lyrics); Bonnie & Clyde – Frank Wildhorn (music) and Don Black (lyrics); One Man, Two Guvnors – Grant Olding (music and lyrics); Peter and the Starcatcher – Wayne Barker (music) and Rick Elice (lyrics)
Best Scenic Design of a Play	Best Scenic Design of a Musical
Donyale Werle – Peter and the Starcatcher; John Lee Beatty – Other Desert Cities; Daniel Ostling – Clybourne Park; Mark Thompson – One Man, Two Guvnors	Bob Crowley – Once; Rob Howell and Jon Driscoll – Ghost the Musical; Tobin Ost and Sven Ortel – Newsies; George Tsypin – Spider-Man: Turn Off the Dark
Best Costume Design of a Play	Best Costume Design of a Musical
Paloma Young – Peter and the Starcatcher; William Ivey Long – Don't Dress for Dinner; Paul Tazewell – A Streetcar Named Desire; Mark Thompson – One Man, Two Guvnors	Gregg Barnes – Follies; ESosa – Porgy and Bess; Eiko Ishioka – Spider-Man: Turn Off the Dark; Martin Pakledinaz – Nice Work If You Can Get It
Best Lighting Design of a Play	Best Lighting Design of a Musical
Jeff Croiter – Peter and the Starcatcher; Peter Kaczorowski – The Road to Mecca; Brian MacDevitt – Death of a Salesman; Kenneth Posner – Other Desert Cities	Natasha Katz – Once; Christopher Akerlind – Porgy and Bess; Natasha Katz – Follies; Hugh Vanstone – Ghost the Musical
Best Sound Design of a Play	Best Sound Design of a Musical
Darron L. West – Peter and the Starcatcher; Paul Arditti – One Man, Two Guvnors; Scott Lehrer – Death of a Salesman; Gareth Owen – End of the Rainbow	Clive Goodwin – Once; Acme Sound Partners – Porgy and Bess; Kai Harada – Follies; Brian Ronan – Nice Work If You Can Get It
Best Direction of a Play	Best Direction of a Musical
Mike Nichols – Death of a Salesman; Nicholas Hytner – One Man, Two Guvnors; Pam MacKinnon – Clybourne Park; Roger Rees and Alex Timbers – Peter and the Starcatcher	John Tiffany – Once; Jeff Calhoun – Newsies; Kathleen Marshall – Nice Work If You Can Get It; Diane Paulus – Porgy and Bess
Best Choreography	Best Orchestrations
Christopher Gattelli – Newsies; Rob Ashford – Evita; Steven Hoggett – Once; Kathleen Marshall – Nice Work If You Can Get It	Martin Lowe – Once; William David Brohn and Christopher Jahnke – Porgy and Bess; Bill Elliott – Nice Work If You Can Get It; Danny Troob – Newsies

=== Multiple nominations ===
- 11: Once
- 10: Nice Work If You Can Get It, Porgy and Bess
- 9: Peter and the Starcatcher
- 8: Follies, Newsies
- 7: Death of a Salesman, One Man, Two Guvnors
- 5: Other Desert Cities
- 4: Clybourne Park
- 3: Evita, End of the Rainbow, Ghost the Musical
- 2: Venus in Fur, Spider-Man: Turn Off the Dark, Jesus Christ Superstar, Wit, The Best Man, Bonnie & Clyde, Don't Dress for Dinner

=== Multiple wins ===
- 8: Once
- 5: Peter and the Starcatcher
- 2: Death of a Salesman, Newsies, Nice Work If You Can Get It, Porgy and Bess

== Non-competitive awards ==
The Tony Award for Excellence in the Theatre has been awarded to Freddie Gershon, Artie Siccardi and the TDF Open Doors Program. Those awards were presented at the Tony Eve Cocktail party, held on June 9, 2012 at the InterContinental Hotel (Times Square). The Special Tony Award for Lifetime Achievement in the Theatre has been awarded to Emanuel Azenberg. Bernadette Peters was presented with the Isabelle Stevenson Award and Special Tony Awards were given to Hugh Jackman and the Actors’ Equity Association. The Regional Theatre Tony Award has been awarded to the Shakespeare Theatre Company.

== In Memoriam ==
- Davy Jones
- Stephen Douglass
- Anna Massey
- John Wood
- Tom Aldredge
- Eiko Ishioka
- Theodore Mann
- Price Berkley
- Ulu Grosbard
- Diane Cilento
- Dick Anthony Williams
- Tony Stevens
- Harry Morgan
- Mary Fickett
- Alice Playten
- Patricia Neway
- Jeffrey Ash
- Howard Kissel
- Shelagh Delaney
- Ray Aghayan
- Margaret Tyzack
- William Duell
- Philip Rose
- Judd Woldin
- Donald Grody
- Ben Gazzara
- Beatrice Terry
- Liviu Ciulei
- Donald Schoenbaum
- Charles Jaffe
- Berenice Weiler
- Buddy Freitag
- Jerry Leiber

== See also ==
- Drama Desk Awards
- 2012 Laurence Olivier Awards – equivalent awards for West End theatre productions
- Obie Award
- New York Drama Critics' Circle
- Theatre World Award
- Lucille Lortel Awards
