= Tony Award for Best Lighting Design in a Musical =

American theatre award for Broadway lighting design

- Awarded for: Best Lighting Design in a Musical
- Location: United States New York City
- Presented by: American Theatre Wing The Broadway League
- Currently held by: Jen Schriever and Michael Arden for The Lost Boys (2026)
- Website: TonyAwards.com

Tony Award for Best Lighting Design in a Musical is an award for outstanding Lighting design of a musical. The award was first presented in 2005 after the category of Best Lighting Design was divided into Lighting Design in a Play and Lighting Design in a Musical with each genre receiving its own award.

== Winners and nominees ==
indicates the winner

=== 2000s ===
Year	Production	Nominees
2005 (59th)
2005 (59th)	The Light in the Piazza	Christopher Akerlind
2005 (59th)	Chitty Chitty Bang Bang	Mark Henderson
2005 (59th)	Dirty Rotten Scoundrels	Kenneth Posner
2005 (59th)	Monty Python's Spamalot	Hugh Vanstone
2006 (60th)
2006 (60th)	Jersey Boys	Howell Binkley
2006 (60th)	The Color Purple	Brian MacDevitt
2006 (60th)	The Drowsy Chaperone	Ken Billington and Brian Monahan
2006 (60th)	Tarzan	Natasha Katz
2007 (61st)
2007 (61st)	Spring Awakening	Kevin Adams
2007 (61st)	110 in the Shade	Christopher Akerlind
2007 (61st)	Grey Gardens	Peter Kaczorowski
2007 (61st)	Mary Poppins	Howard Harrison
2008 (62nd)
2008 (62nd)	Rodgers & Hammerstein's South Pacific	Donald Holder
2008 (62nd)	In the Heights	Howell Binkley
2008 (62nd)	The Little Mermaid	Natasha Katz
2008 (62nd)	Sunday in the Park with George	Ken Billington
2009 (63rd)
2009 (63rd)	Billy Elliot the Musical	Rick Fisher
2009 (63rd)	Hair	Kevin Adams
2009 (63rd)	Next to Normal	Kevin Adams
2009 (63rd)	West Side Story	Howell Binkley

=== 2010s ===
Year	Production	Nominees
2010 (64th)
2010 (64th)	American Idiot	Kevin Adams
2010 (64th)	Fela!	Robert Wierzel
2010 (64th)	La Cage aux Folles	Nick Richings
2010 (64th)	Ragtime	Donald Holder
2011 (65th)
2011 (65th)	The Book of Mormon	Brian MacDevitt
2011 (65th)	Anything Goes	Peter Kaczorowski
2011 (65th)	How to Succeed in Business Without Really Trying	Howell Binkley
2011 (65th)	The Scottsboro Boys	Ken Billington
2012 (66th)
2012 (66th)	Once	Natasha Katz
2012 (66th)	Follies	Natasha Katz
2012 (66th)	Ghost the Musical	Hugh Vanstone
2012 (66th)	Porgy and Bess	Christopher Akerlind
2013 (67th)
2013 (67th)	Matilda the Musical	Hugh Vanstone
2013 (67th)	Kinky Boots	Kenneth Posner
2013 (67th)	Pippin	Kenneth Posner
2013 (67th)	Rodgers + Hammerstein's Cinderella	Kenneth Posner
2014 (68th)
2014 (68th)	Hedwig and the Angry Inch	Kevin Adams
2014 (68th)	After Midnight	Howell Binkley
2014 (68th)	The Bridges of Madison County	Donald Holder
2014 (68th)	Rocky the Musical	Christopher Akerlind
2015 (69th)
2015 (69th)	An American in Paris	Natasha Katz
2015 (69th)	Fun Home	Ben Stanton
2015 (69th)	The King and I	Donald Holder
2015 (69th)	The Visit	Japhy Weideman
2016 (70th)
2016 (70th)	Hamilton	Howell Binkley
2016 (70th)	American Psycho	Justin Townsend
2016 (70th)	Shuffle Along, or, the Making of the Musical Sensation of 1921 and All That Followed	Peggy Eisenhauer and Jules Fisher
2016 (70th)	Spring Awakening	Ben Stanton
2017 (71st)
2017 (71st)	Natasha, Pierre & The Great Comet of 1812	Bradley King
2017 (71st)	Come from Away	Howell Binkley
2017 (71st)	Dear Evan Hansen	Japhy Weideman
2017 (71st)	Hello, Dolly!	Natasha Katz
2018 (72nd)
2018 (72nd)	The Band's Visit	Tyler Micoleau
2018 (72nd)	Carousel	Brian MacDevitt
2018 (72nd)	My Fair Lady	Donald Holder
2018 (72nd)	Once on This Island	Peggy Eisenhauer and Jules Fisher
2018 (72nd)	SpongeBob SquarePants	Kevin Adams
2019 (73rd)
2019 (73rd)	Hadestown	Bradley King
2019 (73rd)	Ain’t Too Proud	Howell Binkley
2019 (73rd)	Beetlejuice	Kenneth Posner and Peter Nigrini
2019 (73rd)	The Cher Show	Kevin Adams
2019 (73rd)	King Kong	Peter Mumford

=== 2020s ===
Year	Production	Nominees
2020 (74th)
2020 (74th)	Moulin Rouge! The Musical	Justin Townsend
2020 (74th)	Jagged Little Pill	Justin Townsend
2020 (74th)	Tina: The Tina Turner Musical	Bruno Poet
2022 (75th)
2022 (75th)	MJ	Natasha Katz
2022 (75th)	Company	Neil Austin
2022 (75th)	Flying Over Sunset	Bradley King
2022 (75th)	Paradise Square	Donald Holder
2022 (75th)	SIX: The Musical	Tim Deiling
2022 (75th)	A Strange Loop	Jen Schriever
2023 (76th)
2023 (76th)	Sweeney Todd: The Demon Barber of Fleet Street	Natasha Katz
2023 (76th)	& Juliet	Howard Hudson
2023 (76th)	Lerner & Loewe's Camelot	Lap Chi Chu
2023 (76th)	New York, New York	Ken Billington
2023 (76th)	Parade	Heather Gilbert
2023 (76th)	Some Like It Hot	Natasha Katz
2024 (77th)
2024 (77th)	The Outsiders	Hana S. Kim and Brian MacDevitt
2024 (77th)	Cabaret at the Kit Kat Club	Isabella Byrd
2024 (77th)	Hell's Kitchen	Natasha Katz
2024 (77th)	Illinoise	Brandon Stirling Baker
2024 (77th)	Water for Elephants	David Bengali and Bradley King
2025 (78th)
2025 (78th)	Sunset Blvd.	Jack Knowles
2025 (78th)	Buena Vista Social Club	Tyler Micoleau
2025 (78th)	Death Becomes Her	Justin Townsend
2025 (78th)	Floyd Collins	Ruey Horng Sun and Scott Zielinski
2025 (78th)	Maybe Happy Ending	Ben Stanton
2026 (79th)
2026 (79th)	The Lost Boys	Jen Schriever and Michael Arden
2026 (79th)	Cats: The Jellicle Ball	Adam Honoré
2026 (79th)	Chess	Kevin Adams
2026 (79th)	Ragtime	Adam Honoré, Donald Holder and 59 Studio
2026 (79th)	The Rocky Horror Show	Jane Cox
2026 (79th)	Schmigadoon!	Donald Holder

== Multiple wins ==
4 Wins

- Natasha Katz

3 Wins

- Kevin Adams

2 Wins

- Howell Binkley
- Bradley King
- Brian MacDevitt
- Donald Holder

== Multiple nominations ==
10 Nominations

- Natasha Katz

8 Nominations

- Kevin Adams
- Howell Binkley
- Donald Holder

5 Nominations

- Kenneth Posner
- Ben Stanton

4 Nominations

- Christopher Akerlind
- Ken Billington
- Bradley King
- Brian MacDevitt

3 Nominations

- Justin Townsend
- Hugh Vanstone

2 Nominations

- Peggy Eisenhauer
- Jules Fisher
- Peter Kaczorowski
- Adam Honoré
- Tyler Micoleau
- Jen Schriever
- Japhy Weideman

== See also ==
- Tony Award for Best Lighting Design in a Play
- Tony Award for Best Lighting Design
- Drama Desk Award for Outstanding Lighting Design
- Laurence Olivier Award for Best Lighting Design
- List of Tony Award-nominated productions
