= Natasha Katz =

American lighting designer

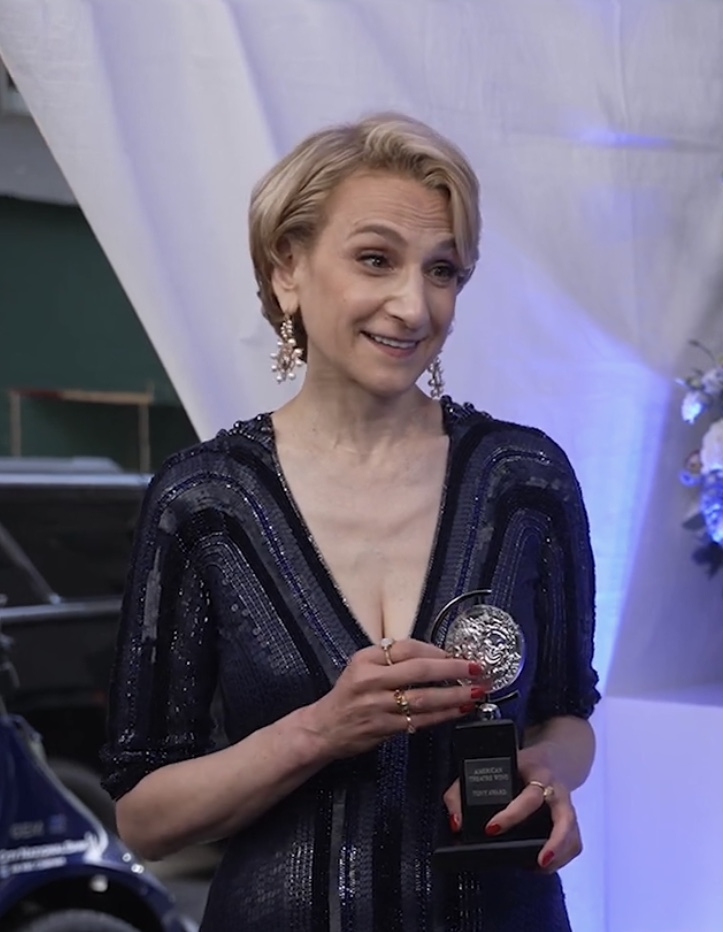
- Katz at the 75th Tony Awards in 2022
- Born: New York, New York, U.S.
- Education: Oberlin College
- Occupation: Lighting designer

Natasha Katz is an American lighting designer for the theatre, dance, and opera. A 13-time nominee for Tony Award for Best Lighting Design in a Musical, she has won five times — more than any other person.

== Biography ==
=== Early life and education ===
A New York City native, Katz trained at Oberlin College and was mentored early in her career by lighting designer and theatre consultant Roger Morgan. Her first Broadway production was as lighting designer for the play Pack of Lies in 1985.

=== Career ===
Katz was nominated for a 2017 Tony Award for Hello, Dolly! and a 2017 Olivier Award for The Glass Menagerie. She won the 2016 Tony Award for Best Lighting Design of a Play for her work on Long Day's Journey Into Night. She has won eight Tony Awards out of 20 total nominations.

Among her over 75 Broadway credits include designs for Frozen, Springsteen on Broadway, Meteor Shower, Cats, School of Rock, Gigi, Skylight, An American in Paris (2015 Tony Award), Aladdin, The Glass Menagerie (2014 Tony Award), Motown: The Musical, Once (2012 Tony Award), Follies, Sister Act, Elf, Collected Stories, The Addams Family, Hedda Gabler, The Little Mermaid, The Coast of Utopia: Salvage (2007 Tony Award), A Chorus Line (revival), Tarzan, The 25th Annual Putnam County Spelling Bee, Sweet Smell of Success, Aida (2000 Tony Award), Twelfth Night, Beauty and the Beast, and Gypsy.

She has lit the performances of Bette Midler, Zachary Quinto, Jake Gyllenhaal, Mike Tyson, Jessica Lange, Helen Hunt, Mary Louise Parker, Christopher Plummer, Elaine Stritch, Cathy Rigby, Nathan Lane, Bernadette Peters, Claudette Colbert and Sir Rex Harrison. She has also designed concert acts for Shirley MacLaine, Ann-Margret, Tommy Tune, and most recently Prince’s 2014 SNL appearance.

In the world of dance, Katz is a frequent collaborator with choreographer Christopher Wheeldon, with projects including Tryst, Alice's Adventures in Wonderland, The Winter's Tale, and Like Water for Chocolate, all for The Royal Ballet in London. Other collaborations with Wheeldon include Continuum (San Francisco Ballet), Carnival of the Animals (New York City Ballet), An American in Paris (New York City Ballet, Théâtre du Châtelet, Broadway, London), Swan Lake (Pennsylvania Ballet), Cinderella (Dutch National Ballet), The Nutcracker (Joffrey Ballet). ( Her other dance work includes American Ballet Theatre's production of Don Quixote and productions with companies including San Francisco Ballet, Dutch National Ballet, and National Ballet of Canada.

For the opera stage, her credits include Cyrano de Bergerac for the Metropolitan Opera, Die Soldaten for the New York City Opera, two productions of Norma for Dame Joan Sutherland: the Opera Pacific (in Costa Mesa, California) and the Michigan Opera Theatre (in Detroit). She worked with The Royal Opera on Cyrano de Bergerac, directed by Francesca Zambello.

Her film work includes Barrymore starring Christopher Plummer and Mike Tyson: The Undisputed Truth. She lit the HBO television specials Mambo Mouth and Spic-O-Rama starring John Leguizamo and scenes from two episodes of Girls shot inside the Belasco Theatre on 44th Street in New York City.

Her work may be seen in filmed performances of The Winter's Tale, Alice's Adventures in Wonderland and An American in Paris as well as the PBS documentary "Making a New Nutcracker" and the American Theatre Wing documentary Working in the Theatre: Lighting Design.

Her permanent audio-visual shows include The Masquerade Village at the Rio Casino, Las Vegas, the Big Bang at the Hayden Planetarium in New York, and the Niketown stores in New York City and London.

She is currently a mentor for the Theatre Development Fund's Wendy Wasserstein Project (formerly known as Open Doors).

== Selected awards ==
Year	Nominated work	Category	Result	Notes
1994	Beauty and the Beast	Tony Award for Best Lighting Design	Nominated	
1995	Beauty and the Beast	Ovation Award for Best Lighting Design - Larger Theatre	Nominated	
1995	Beauty and the Beast	Los Angeles Drama Critics Circle Award for Distinguished Achievement in Lighting Design	Won	
1996	Beauty and the Beast	Dora Mavor Moore Award for Outstanding Lighting Design - Large Theatre Division	Won	
1998	The Scarlet Pimpernel	Outer Critics Circle Award	Nominated	
1999	Twelfth Night	Tony Award for Best Lighting Design	Nominated	
1999	Twelfth Night	Drama Desk Award for Outstanding Lighting Design	Nominated	
2000	Aida	Tony Award for Best Lighting Design	Won	
2000	Aida	Friends of New York Theatre Awards for Outstanding Lighting Design	Nominated	
2001	Beauty and the Beast	National Broadway Theatre Awards for Best Visual Presentation	Won	
2002	Aida	National Broadway Theatre Awards for Best Visual Presentation	Won	
2002	Sweet Smell of Success: The Musical	Tony Award for Best Lighting Design	Nominated	
2002	Sweet Smell of Success: The Musical	Drama Desk Award for Outstanding Lighting Design	Nominated	
2003	Aida	National Broadway Theatre Awards for Best Production Design	Won	
2006	Ruth Morley Design Award for Outstanding Career in Lighting Design		Won	
2006	Tarzan: The Musical	Tony Award for Best Lighting Design of a Musical	Nominated	
2007	The Coast of Utopia	Tony Award for Best Lighting Design of a Play	Won	With Brian MacDevitt and Kenneth Posner
2007	The Coast of Utopia	Drama Desk Award for Outstanding Lighting Design	Won	With Brian MacDevitt and Kenneth Posner
2007	The Coast of Utopia	Outer Critics Circle Award	Won	With Brian MacDevitt and Kenneth Posner
2008	The Little Mermaid	Tony Award for Best Lighting Design of a Musical	Nominated	
2008	The Little Mermaid	Drama Desk Award for Outstanding Lighting Design	Nominated	
2009	Turn of the Century	Jeff Award for Lighting Design - Large	Nominated	
2010	Sister Act	WhatsOnStage Awards for Best Lighting Design	Won	
2010	The Addams Family	Drama Desk Award for Outstanding Lighting Design	Nominated	
2011	Sister Act	Outer Critics Circle Award	Nominated	
2012	The Iceman Cometh	Jeff Award for Lighting Design - Large	Won	
2012	Follies	Tony Award for Best Lighting Design of a Musical	Nominated	
2012	Once	Tony Award for Best Lighting Design of a Musical	Won	
2012	Once	Lucille Lortel Awards	Won	
2014	Aladdin	Outer Critics Circle Award	Nominated	
2014	The Glass Menagerie	Tony Award for Best Lighting Design of a Play	Won	
2015	Skylight	Tony Award for Best Lighting Design of a Play	Nominated	
2015	An American in Paris	Tony Award for Best Lighting Design of a Musical	Won	
2015	An American in Paris	Outer Critics Circle Award	Nominated	
2015	The Iceman Cometh	Drama Desk Award for Outstanding Lighting Design	Nominated	
2016	Long Day's Journey into Night	Tony Award for Best Lighting Design of a Play	Won	
2016	Long Day's Journey into Night	Outer Critics Circle Award	Nominated	
2016	Live Design - Design Achievement of the Year for Sustained Achievement in Theatrical Lighting Design		Won	
2017	Aladdin	WhatsOnStage Awards for Best Lighting Design	Nominated	
2017	Hello, Dolly!	Tony Award for Best Lighting Design of a Musical	Nominated	
2017	Hello, Dolly!	Outer Critics Circle Award	Nominated	
2017	The Glass Menagerie	Olivier Award for Best Lighting Design	Nominated	
2017	An American in Paris	BroadwayWorld UK Awards for Best Lighting Design of a New Production of a Play or Musical	Won	
2018	An American in Paris	WhatsOnStage Awards for Best Lighting Design	Nominated	
2018	Aladdin	Green Room Awards for the Music Theatre Award for Lighting Design	Won	
2018	Sarah Applebaum Nederlander Award for Excellence in the Theatre "Apple Award"		Won	Wayne State University
2022	MJ	Tony Award for Best Lighting Design of a Musical	Won	
2022	MJ	Outer Critics Circle Award for Best Lighting Design (Play or Musical)	Nominated	
2022	MJ	Drama Desk Award for Outstanding Lighting Design for a Musical	Won	
2022	Diana	Drama Desk Award for Outstanding Lighting Design for a Musical	Nominated	
2023	Some Like It Hot	Tony Award for Best Lighting Design in a Musical	Nominated	
2023	Sweeney Todd: The Demon Barber of Fleet Street	Tony Award for Best Lighting Design in a Musical	Won	
2023	Sweeney Todd: The Demon Barber of Fleet Street	Drama Desk Award for Outstanding Lighting Design for a Musical	Won	
2024	Hell's Kitchen	Tony Award for Best Lighting Design in a Musical	Nominated	
2024	Grey House	Tony Award for Best Lighting Design of a Play	Nominated	
2024	Grey House	Drama Desk Award for Outstanding Lighting Design	Nominated	
2025	John Proctor is the Villain	Tony Award for Best Lighting Design in a Play	Nominated	
2025	John Proctor is the Villain	Drama Desk Award for Outstanding Lighting Design for a Play	Nominated	
