= Ken Billington =

American lighting designer

- Born: October 29, 1946 (age 79); White Plains, New York, U.S.
- Occupation: Lighting designer
- Years active: 1967-Present
- Awards: Tony Award for Best Lighting Design (1997) Drama Desk Award for Outstanding Lighting Design (1997) Outer Critics Circle Award for Outstanding Lighting Design (2008)

Ken Billington (born October 29, 1946) is an American lighting designer. He began his career in New York City working as an assistant to Tharon Musser.

== Early life ==
Billington was born in White Plains, New York, the son of Kenneth Arthur (an automobile dealer) and Ruth Billington.

== Radio City Music Hall, Las Vegas Productions and Other Works ==
Billington was the principal lighting designer for Radio City Music Hall from 1979 to 2004, where he created the lighting for the world-famous Christmas Spectacular Starring the Radio City Rockettes and the Easter Radio City Spring Spectacular. While there, he also created the lighting for the stage adaptation of the 1937 animated musical film Snow White and the Seven Dwarfs.

Billington has worked extensively in Las Vegas lighting nightclub acts for headliners Ann-Margret, Shirley MacLaine, Liberace, Juliet Prowse, Chita Rivera, The McGuire Sisters and more. He has designed for the long-running Las Vegas Spectaculars Jubilee! at Bally's Las Vegas, Siegfried & Roy in Beyond Belief at the New Frontier Hotel and Casino as well as Splash at the Riviera (hotel and casino).

Billington's lighting is featured in the extravaganza Fantasmic! at Disneyland, Shamu Night shows at the Seaworld Parks and multiple shows at Busch Gardens Williamsburg. His architectural designs can be seen in restaurants and clubs from Manhattan to Asia including Tavern on the Green and 54 Below Ken also designed the lighting plot and original design on multiple shows for Dolly Parton's Dixie Stampede.

Other projects include lighting the 1975/76 season for the American Shakespeare Festival at Stratford, Connecticut as well as projects such as Turandot at the Vienna State Opera.

== Achievements ==
Billington has been nominated for the Tony Award for Best Lighting Design nine times and in 1997 won for the revival of Chicago, which also garnered him the Drama Desk Award for Outstanding Lighting Design. He won the Outer Critics Circle Award for Outstanding Lighting Design in 2008 for the Broadway revival of Sunday in the Park with George. Additionally, he has been awarded the Los Angeles Drama Critics Circle Award and Boston Drama Critics Award: acknowledged for notable contributions to theatre lighting.

Ken has received many other awards for his work including the Ace Award (CableACE Award) for Television Lighting and the Lumen Award (Illuminating Engineering Society) for Architectural Lighting.

In November 2015, Billington was inducted into the Theater Hall of Fame.

== Awards and nominations ==
Year	Title	Award	Category	Result
1974	The Visit	Tony Award	Best Lighting Design	Nominated
1978	Working	Tony Award	Best Lighting Design	Nominated
1979	Sweeney Todd: The Demon Barber of Fleet Street	Tony Award	Best Lighting Design	Nominated
1979	Sweeney Todd: The Demon Barber of Fleet Street	Drama Desk Award	Outstanding Lighting Design	Nominated
1983	Foxfire	Tony Award	Best Lighting Design	Nominated
1983	Foxfire	Drama Desk Award	Outstanding Lighting Design	Nominated
1984	End of the World	Tony Award	Best Lighting Design	Nominated
1985	Grind	Drama Desk Award	Outstanding Lighting Design	Nominated
1997	Chicago	Tony Award	Best Lighting Design	Won
1997	Chicago	Drama Desk Award	Outstanding Lighting Design	Won
1997	Chicago	Outer Critics Circle Award	Best Lighting Design	Nominated
2006	The Drowsy Chaperone	Tony Award	Best Lighting Design in a Musical	Nominated
2008	Sunday in the Park with George	Tony Award	Best Lighting Design in a Musical	Nominated
2008	Sunday in the Park with George	Drama Desk Award	Outstanding Lighting Design	Nominated
2008	Sunday in the Park with George	Outer Critics Circle Award	Outstanding Lighting Design	Won
2010	Sondheim on Sondheim	Outer Critics Circle Award	Outstanding Lighting Design	Nominated
2011	The Scottsboro Boys	Tony Award	Best Lighting Design in a Musical	Nominated
2013	Chaplin	Drama Desk Award	Outstanding Lighting Design	Nominated
2013	Chaplin	Outer Critics Circle Award	Outstanding Lighting Design	Nominated
2022	New York, New York	Tony Award	Best Lighting Design in a Musical	Nominated
2022	New York, New York	Drama Desk Award	Outstanding Lighting Design	Nominated
