= Brian MacDevitt =

American lighting designer

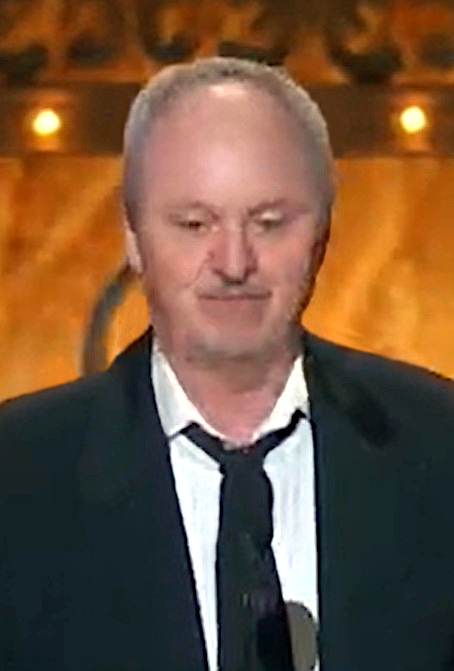
- MacDevitt at the Tony Awards in 2024
- Born: Long Island, New York
- Education: State University of New York, Purchase (BFA)
- Occupations: Lighting designer, professor
- Years active: 1984-present
- Awards: Tony Award for Best Lighting Design; Tony Award for Best Lighting Design in a Play; Tony Award for Best Lighting Design in a Musical

Brian MacDevitt is a lighting designer and educator. He has worked extensively on Broadway and Off Broadway, as well as touring, Regional theatre, and Industrial productions. He won the Tony Award for Best Lighting Design for his work on the 2002 Broadway revival of Into The Woods. He also won the Tony Award for Best Lighting Design in a Play three times and the Tony Award for Best Lighting Design in a Musical twice, most recently in 2024 for The Outsiders.

== Early life and education ==
A Long Island, New York, native, MacDevitt went to Ward Melville High School in East Setauket. Afterwards, he attended SUNY Purchase and graduated with a degree in Lighting Design from the Department of Design/Technology of the Division of Theatre Arts & Film.

== Career ==
After graduation MacDevitt spent a decade honing his craft with Off Broadway and other productions, and also developed a reputation as a teacher of design. He began teaching at Purchase as a visiting professor in 1986. He continued to balance his teaching career while breaking into Broadway in 1994 with What's Wrong With This Picture? MacDevitt started to achieve notice with the Terrence McNally play Love! Valour! Compassion! in 1995. His success continued through the 1990s, and eventually culminated with a Tony Award for Best Lighting Design in 2002 for the revival of Into the Woods. He won again in 2005 for The Pillowman, in 2007 for The Coast of Utopia, sharing the award with Kenneth Posner and Natasha Katz (The three also won the Drama Desk Award for Outstanding Lighting Design for Utopia.)

In fall of 2009, MacDevitt began working as an Associate Professor of lighting design at the University of Maryland, College Park, where he is still teaching. He also designed the revival of Neil Simon's Brighton Beach Memoirs, Broadway Bound and David Mamet's new play Race. In the 2010 season he designed A Behanding in Spokane, Fences, Armida at The Metropolitan Opera, and Women on the Verge of a Nervous Breakdown. In 2011 he designed The Book of Mormon, Le comte Ory at The Metropolitan Opera and The House of Blue Leaves. MacDevitt won the Tony in 2009 for his lighting of the play Joe Turner's Come and Gone and again in 2011, for the musical Book of Mormon.

== Productions ==
=== Broadway ===
- What's Wrong With This Picture? – 1994
- Love! Valour! Compassion! – 1995
- Master Class – 1995
- Summer and Smoke – 1996
- Sex and Longing – 1996
- Present Laughter – 1996
- Side Show – 1997
- Proposals – 1997
- The Diary of Anne Frank – 1997
- Wait Until Dark – 1998
- Night Must Fall – 1999
- True West – 2000
- The Ride Down Mt. Morgan – 2000
- The Dinner Party – 2000
- Judgment at Nuremberg – 2001
- The Invention of Love – 2001
- A Thousand Clowns – 2001
- Major Barbara – 2001
- Urinetown – 2001
- The Women – 2001
- Morning's at Seven – 2002
- Into the Woods – 2002
- Frankie and Johnny in the Clair de Lune – 2002
- Tartuffe – 2003
- Nine – 2003
- Long Day's Journey Into Night – 2003
- The Retreat from Moscow – 2003
- Henry IV (Parts 1 and) 2) – 2003
- Fiddler on the Roof – 2004
- Match – 2004
- A Raisin in the Sun – 2004
- 'night, Mother – 2004
- Pacific Overtures – 2004
- Good Vibrations – 2005
- The Pillowman – 2005
- Sweet Charity – 2005
- Absurd Person Singular – 2005
- The Color Purple – 2005
- The Wedding Singer – 2006
- The Coast of Utopia (Part 1 - Voyage) – 2006
- The Vertical Hour – 2006
- Inherit the Wind – 2007
- Cymbeline – 2007
- A Catered Affair – 2008
- 13 – 2008
- Speed-the-Plow – 2008
- American Buffalo – 2008
- You're Welcome America – 2009
- Blithe Spirit – 2009
- Joe Turner's Come and Gone – 2009
- Accent on Youth – 2009
- Brighton Beach Memoirs – 2009
- Race – 2010
- A Behanding in Spokane – 2010
- Fences – 2010
- Women on the Verge of a Nervous Breakdown – 2010
- The Book of Mormon – 2011
- The House of Blue Leaves – 2011
- The Mountaintop – 2011
- Chinglish – 2011
- Death of a Salesman – 2012
- Betrayal – 2013
- A Raisin in the Sun – 2014
- This Is Our Youth – 2014
- A Delicate Balance – 2014
- Fish in the Dark – 2015
- Blackbird – 2016
- The Front Page – 2016
- Carousel – 2018
- The Waverly Gallery – 2018
- The Minutes – 2022
- Plaza Suite – 2022
- The Outsiders - 2024

=== Touring ===
- Gigi (1984-1985)
- Can-Can (1988-1989)
- Angels in America: Millennium Approaches (1994-1996)
- Master Class (1996-1997)
- Urinetown (2003-2004)
- The Color Purple (2007-2010)
- The Book of Mormon Tours
  - Latter Day Tour (2012-2016)
  - Jumamosi Tour (2012-2020)

=== West End ===
- The Book of Mormon – 2021

=== Off-Broadway ===
- Splendid Mummer – 1988
- The Waves – 1990
- Subfertile – 1990
- Light Shining in Buckinghamshire – 1991
- Fayebird – 1991
- Shmulnik's Waltz – 1991
- Man, Woman, Dinosaur – 1992
- And – 1992
- Candide – 1992
- Goodnight Desdemona (Good Morning Juliet) – 1992
- Three Hotels – 1993
- Krapp's Last Tape – 1993
- Later Life – 1993
- The Maids – 1993
- Family Secrets – 1993
- First Lady Suite – 1993
- The Illusion – 1994
- The Mayors of Boy Town – 1994
- The Arabian Nights – 1994
- The Triumph of Love – 1994
- Dog Opera – 1995
- Northeast Local – 1995
- Master Class – 1995
- Blue Window – 1996
- Overtime – 1996
- Nude Nude Totally Nude – 1996
- A Line Around the Block – 1996
- By the Sea, By the Sea, By the Beautiful Sea – 1996
- Henry V – 1996
- God's Heart – 1997
- Mizlansky Zilinsky or 'Schmucks' – 1998
- Corpus Christi – 1998
- The Ride Down Mt. Morgan – 1998
- Captains Courageous – 1999
- East is East – 1999
- The Taming of the Shrew – 1999
- The Exact Center of the Universe – 1999
- An Experiment with an Air Pump – 1999
- Fuddy Meers – 2000
- The Time of the Cuckoo – 2000
- Lydie Breeze (Parts 1 and 2) – 2000
- Spinning Into Butter – 2000
- Juno and the Paycock – 2000
- Comic Potential – 2000
- Resident Alien – 2001
- Urinetown – 2001
- Speaking in Tongues – 2001
- Homebody/Kabul – 2001
- Tuesdays with Morrie – 2002
- Blue/Orange – 2002
- Kimberly Akimbo – 2002
- Lone Star Love – 2004
- Dog Sees God – 2005
- Family Secrets – 2006
- The House in Town – 2006
- Pig Farm – 2006
- Our Leading Lady – 2007
- The Receptionist – 2007
- The Seagull – 2008
- Hold On to Me Darling – 2016

=== The Metropolitan Opera ===
- Armida – 2010
- Le comte Opry – 2011

== Awards and nominations ==
=== Tony Awards ===
| Year | Category | Work | Result |
|---|---|---|---|
| 2002 | Best Lighting Design | Into the Woods | Won |
| 2003 | Best Lighting Design | Nine | Nominated |
| 2004 | Best Lighting Design | Henry IV (Parts 1 and) 2) | Nominated |
| 2004 | Best Lighting Design | Fiddler on the Roof | Nominated |
| 2005 | Best Lighting Design in a Play | The Pillowman | Won |
| 2006 | Best Lighting Design in a Musical | The Color Purple | Nominated |
| 2007 | Best Lighting Design in a Play | Inherit The Wind | Nominated |
| 2007 | Best Lighting Design in a Play | The Coast of Utopia (Part 1 - Voyage) | Won |
| 2009 | Best Lighting Design in a Play | Joe Turner's Come and Gone | Won |
| 2010 | Best Lighting Design in a Play | Fences | Nominated |
| 2011 | Best Lighting Design in a Musical | The Book of Mormon | Won |
| 2012 | Best Lighting Design in a Play | Death of a Salesman | Nominated |
| 2018 | Best Lighting Design in a Musical | Carousel | Nominated |
| 2024 | Best Lighting Design in a Musical | The Outsiders | Won |

=== Drama Desk Awards ===
| Year | Category | Work | Result |
|---|---|---|---|
| 1993 | Outstanding Lighting Design | Three Hotels | Nominated |
| 1995 | Outstanding Lighting Design | Love! Valour! Compassion! | Nominated |
| 2000 | Outstanding Lighting Design | An Experiment with an Air Pump | Nominated |
| 2001 | Outstanding Lighting Design | The Invention of Love | Nominated |
| 2004 | Outstanding Lighting Design | Henry IV (Parts 1 and) 2) | Nominated |
| 2007 | Outstanding Lighting Design | The Coast of Utopia (Part 1 - Voyage) | Won |
| 2012 | Outstanding Lighting Design | Death of a Salesman | Won |
| 2018 | Outstanding Lighting Design For a Musical | Carousel | Nominated |
| 2024 | Outstanding Lighting Design For a Musical | The Outsiders | Won |

=== Outer Critics Circle Awards ===
| Year | Category | Work | Result |
|---|---|---|---|
| 1999 | Outstanding Lighting Design | Night Must Fall | Nominated |
| 2001 | Outstanding Lighting Design | The Invention of Love | Won |
| 2003 | Outstanding Lighting Design | Nine | Nominated |
| 2004 | Outstanding Lighting Design | Fiddler on the Roof | Nominated |
| 2005 | Outstanding Lighting Design | The Pillowman | Nominated |
| 2007 | Outstanding Lighting Design | The Coast of Utopia | Won |
| 2012 | Outstanding Lighting Design | Death of a Salesman | Nominated |
| 2022 | Outstanding Lighting Design | The Minutes | Nominated |
| 2024 | Outstanding Lighting Design | The Outsiders | Won |
