= Paul Gallo =

American theatrical lighting designer (born 1953)

- Photo by Brendan Ragan
- Born: Paul Leonard Gallo; February 24, 1953 (age 73); New York City, New York, U.S.
- Education: Ithaca College (BFA); Yale School of Drama (MFA)
- Occupation: Lighting Designer
- Years active: 1977–present
- Spouse: Judith Martin Gallo (m. 1987)
- Children: Francesca Ruth Gallo; Nicholas Martin Gallo
- Awards: 1 Drama Desk Awards; 5 Outer Critics Circle Awards; 2 Obie Awards
- Website: PaulGalloStudio.com

Paul Gallo (born February 24, 1953) is an American theatrical lighting designer.

In a career that spans over 4 decades, Gallo has designed over 52 Broadway productions, an achievement matched by only 8 other lighting designers. He made his Broadway debut at the age of 27 with Passione, starring Jerry Stiller.

Gallo has received eight nominations for the Tony Award for Best Lighting Design and ten nominations for the Drama Desk Award for Outstanding Lighting Design, which he won for the 1992 revival of Guys and Dolls. He won the Henry Hewes Design Award, Collaborative Design Achievement-Lighting Design for the Public Theater production of Vienna: Lusthaus in 1986, and was nominated for Hewes Design Award, Lighting Design, for The Crucible (2002).

== Biography ==
Gallo was born in New York City near Arthur Avenue in the Bronx, the son of Lola (Morales) Gallo and Albert Gallo who were ballroom dancers in the 1950s. Gallo attended Ithaca College on an acting scholarship but soon discovered his aptitude for lighting. He then went on to study lighting with Tom Skelton and Ming Cho Lee in graduate school at the Yale School of Drama, where he got his MFA.

== Original Broadway Productions (selected) ==
- Grown Ups (1981)
- Beyond Therapy (1982)
- Come Back To The Five And Dime, Jimmy Dean, Jimmy Dean (1982)
- The Mystery of Edwin Drood (1985)
- The House of Blue Leaves (1986)
- Smile (1986)
- City of Angels (1989)
- Lend Me a Tenor (1989)
- Six Degrees of Separation (1990)
- I Hate Hamlet (1991)
- Crazy for You (1992)
- Smokey Joe's Cafe (1995)
- Titanic (1997)
- Triumph of Love (1997)
- The Civil War (1999)
- Three Days of Rain (2006)
- A Bronx Tale (2007)
- Mauritius (2007)
- November (2008)
- Wonderland (2011)
- Three Tall Women (2018)

== Celebrated Revivals on Broadway (selected) ==
- Anything Goes (1987)
- Guys and Dolls (1992)
- A Funny Thing Happened On The Way To The Forum (1996)
- The Sound Of Music (1998)
- The Rocky Horror Show (2000)
- 42nd Street (2001)
- Man Of La Mancha (2002)
- The Crucible (2002)
- Pal Joey (2008)

== Film Lighting ==
- O.C. and Stiggs (1985)
- The Comedy Of Errors (1987)
- The Man Who Came To Dinner (2000)
- Chicago (2002)
- "The Marvelous Mrs. Maisel" - S3, Ep 8 & 9 (2019)

== Tony Award nominations ==
for Best Lighting Design:

- 1986 The House of Blue Leaves
- 1988 Anything Goes
- 1990 City of Angels
- 1992 Crazy for You
- 1992 Guys and Dolls
- 2001 42nd Street
- 2002 The Crucible
- 2006 Three Days of Rain
