= Beyond Therapy =

Play written by Christopher Durang

- Original language: English
- Written by: Christopher Durang

Premiere
- Date: January 1, 1981
- Place: Phoenix Theatre; New York City

Beyond Therapy is a 1981 American play written by Christopher Durang.

== Synopsis ==
This farcical comedy focuses on Prudence and Bruce, two Manhattanites who are seeking stable romantic relationships with the help of their psychiatrists, each of whom suggests their patient place a personal ad in the newspaper. Bruce is a highly emotional bisexual who tends to cry easily, a trait Prudence sees as a weakness. Their first meeting proves to be disastrous and the two report back to their respective therapists—libidinous Stuart, who once seduced Prudence, and eccentric Charlotte, who stumbles over the simplest of words, who references the play Equus as a good source of advice, and who interacts with her patients with the help of a stuffed Snoopy doll. Clearly the two therapists are more troubled than their patients. Charlotte suggests a revised ad, which once again attracts Prudence, but this time Prudence and Bruce manage to get past their initial loathing and discover they actually like each other. Complications ensue when Bruce's jealous live-in lover Bob decides to assert himself and do everything possible to maintain his status quo.

== Productions ==
An off-Broadway production directed by Jerry Zaks opened on January 1, 1981, at the Phoenix Theatre in New York, where it ran for 30 performances. The cast included Sigourney Weaver as Prudence, Stephen Collins as Bruce, Jim Borrelli as Stuart, Kate McGregor-Stewart as Charlotte, and Jack Gilpin as Bob. The sets were designed by Karen Schultz, costumes by Jennifer von Mayrhauser, and lighting by Richard Nelson.

Beyond Therapy premiered on Broadway on May 26, 1982. It was directed by John Madden, sets were designed by Andrew Jackness, costumes by Jennifer von Mayrhauser, lighting by Paul Gallo. The cast included Dianne Wiest as Prudence, John Lithgow as Bruce, Jack Gilpin as Bob, Kate McGregor-Stewart as Charlotte, and Peter Michael Goetz as Stuart. David Hyde Pierce made his Broadway debut in the role of a waiter.

McGregor-Stewart was nominated for the Drama Desk Award for Outstanding Featured Actress in a Play.

In 1987, Durang adapted his play for a screenplay that was rewritten substantially by director Robert Altman. Although the two shared a screenwriting credit, Durang described the project as "a very unhappy experience and outcome."

Beyond Therapy is one of Durang's most frequently produced plays. A recording of the play, featuring Catherine O'Hara as Prudence and David Hyde Pierce as Bruce, has been released on CD by the Fynsworth Alley label.
