= Bradley King (lighting designer) =

American theatrical lighting designer

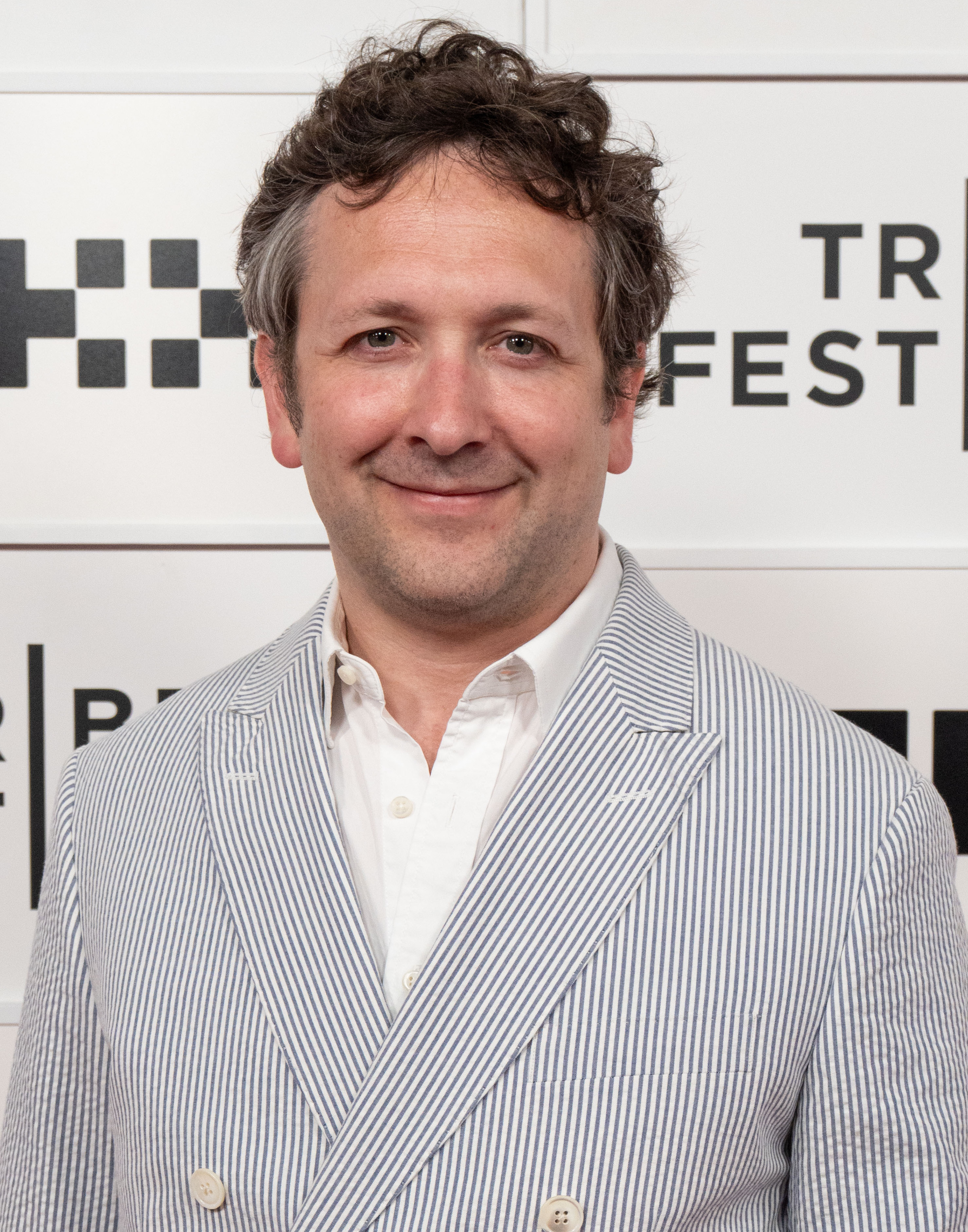
- King in 2026
- Education: New York University (BFA, MFA)
- Occupation: Lighting designer
- Years active: 2006–present
- Known for: Natasha, Pierre & The Great Comet of 1812; Hadestown
- Spouse: Danielle King
- Children: 2
- Awards: Tony Award for Best Lighting Design in a Musical (2017, 2019)

Bradley King is an American theatrical lighting designer, best known for his work on the musicals Natasha, Pierre & The Great Comet of 1812 and Hadestown, for which he won the Tony Award for Best Lighting Design in a Musical in 2017 and 2019, respectively.

== Early life and education ==
King grew up in Baltimore, Maryland, where he attended Gilman School, a private college-preparatory school. He attended New York University's Tisch School of the Arts and earned a BFA in theatrical directing and later earned an MFA in design.

He is married to Danielle King, the managing producer of The Tank theater; the couple have two children.

== Awards and nominations ==
Year	Award	Category	Work	Result
2014	Lucille Lortel Award	Outstanding Lighting Design	Natasha, Pierre, & The Great Comet of 1812	Nominated
2017	Tony Award	Best Lighting Design in a Musical	Natasha, Pierre, & The Great Comet of 1812	Won
2017	Drama Desk Award	Outstanding Lighting Design for a Musical	Natasha, Pierre, & The Great Comet of 1812	Won
2017	Drama Desk Award	Outstanding Lighting Design for a Musical	Hadestown	Nominated
2017	Outer Critics Circle Award	Outstanding Lighting Design	Natasha, Pierre, & The Great Comet of 1812	Won
2019	Tony Award	Best Lighting Design in a Musical	Hadestown	Won
2019	Drama Desk Award	Outstanding Lighting Design for a Musical	Hadestown	Won
2019	Outer Critics Circle Award	Outstanding Lighting Design	Hadestown	Won
2018	Lucille Lortel Award	Outstanding Lighting Design	The Treasurer	Nominated
2022	Tony Award	Best Lighting Design in a Musical	Flying Over Sunset	Nominated
