= Chris Parry (lighting designer) =

English lighting designer (1952–2007)

Chris Parry (23 May 1952 in the United Kingdom – 16 January 2007 in San Diego, California) was a theatrical lighting designer. He worked on several Broadway and West End productions and was nominated for the Tony Award for Best Lighting Design three times, winning for The Who's Tommy. He also won the Drama Desk Award for Outstanding Lighting Design three times.

Parry's credits include more than 150 designs worldwide including productions for the Royal Shakespeare Company and the Royal National Theatre in the UK, and designs for the Los Angeles Opera, Welsh National Opera, Opera Theatre of Lucca in Italy, as well as many regional theatres. In 1993, he received the Lighting Designer of the Year Award from Lighting Dimensions magazine.

Parry was known for using the Gel "Rosco 68 - Skye Blue". After his death, Rosco renamed the gel "Parry Sky Blue".

Parry was the Head of Design at the University of California, San Diego until his death. He had taught there for 18 years. He also and had one son, Richard Parry.
