= Pat Collins (lighting designer) =

American lighting designer (1932–2021)

- Born: Patricia Jane Collins; April 3, 1932; New York City, US
- Died: March 21, 2021 (aged 88); Branford, Connecticut, US
- Education: Pembroke College in Brown University; Yale School of Drama
- Occupation: Lighting designer

Patricia Jane Collins (April 3, 1932 – March 21, 2021) was an American lighting designer.

== Career ==
Collins made her Broadway debut with a 1976 revival of Threepenny Opera. Her additional New York City credits include Ain't Misbehavin', King of Hearts, I'm Not Rappaport, Execution of Justice, The Heidi Chronicles, Conversations with My Father, The Sisters Rosensweig, Proof, Dr. Seuss' How the Grinch Stole Christmas!, and Doubt.

In 1986, Collins won the Tony Award for Best Lighting Design for I'm Not Rappaport and the Drama Desk Award for Outstanding Lighting Design for Execution of Justice.

Pat Collins was also active with regional theaters such as Hartford Stage Company, Goodman Theater, McCarter Theater, Steppenwolf, Lincoln Center, Mark Taper Forum, Old Globe Theater and Ford's Theater.

=== "Good People" ===
In the production "Good People", Collins' goal was to bring naturalism to the show. Collins was aware not only of the need to hear actors but also the need to see them speak. She said that the lighting was dictated by what scenic designer John Lee Beatty did with the sets, but her job went a little deeper than that. "It is really quite specific in its locations, and it is about trying to make you believe those locations that became my job as well as making sure that you heard because you could see those actors all of the time."

== Productions ==
Pat Collins was a Lighting Designer for all of the following productions:

- The Widow Lincoln [Ford's Theatre, 2015]
- How the Grinch Stole Christmas! [The Old Globe, 2013]
- Orphans [Broadway, 2013]
- How the Grinch Stole Christmas! [Broadway, 2006]
- Doubt [Broadway, 2005]
- Sight Unseen [Broadway, 2004]
- How the Grinch Stole Christmas! [San Diego, CA (Regional), 2003]
- I'm Not Rappaport [Broadway, 2002]
- Proof [Broadway, 2000]
- A Moon for the Misbegotten [Broadway, 2000]
- How the Grinch Stole Christmas! [San Diego, CA (Regional), 1998]
- Once Upon a Mattress [Broadway, 1996]
- Paper Moon [Broadway, 1993]
- Into the Woods [West End, 1990]
- One Two Three Four Five [Off-Broadway, 1988]
- Ain't Misbehavin' [Broadway, 1988]
- In a Pig's Valise [Regional (US), 1986]
- I'm Not Rappaport [Broadway, 1985]
- Quartermaine's Terms [Off-Broadway, 1983]
- Baby [Broadway, 1983]
- Livin' Dolls [Off-Off-Broadway, 1982]
- Snapshot [Off-Off-Broadway, 1980]
- Ain't Misbehavin' [West End, 1979]
- King of Hearts [Broadway, 1978]
- Sammy Stops the World [Broadway, 1978]
- Ain't Misbehavin' [Broadway, 1978]
- The Threepenny Opera [Broadway, 1976]

== Awards and nominations ==
=== Drama Desk Award ===
- 1988: Outstanding Lighting Design for Woman in Mind - Nominee
- 1986: Outstanding Lighting Design for Execution of Justice - Winner
- 1981: Outstanding Lighting Design for Penguin Touquet - Nominee

=== Tony Award ===
- 2005: Lighting Design of a Play for Doubt - Nominee
- 1986: Lighting Design (Play or Musical) for I'm Not Rappaport - Winner
- 1977: Lighting Design (Play or Musical) for The Threepenny Opera - Nominee
