= Gilbert Vaughn Hemsley Jr. =

American lighting designer

Gilbert Vaughn Hemsley Jr. (1936–1983) was a noted American lighting designer and teacher of lighting design.

== Biography ==
He was born in Bridgeport, Connecticut, in 1936.

Hemsley studied history at Yale (B.A. 1957), earned an M.F.A. at Yale Drama School in 1960, and worked as assistant to lighting designers Jean Rosenthal and Tharon Musser. His first institutional position was at Princeton University’s McCarter Theater (1960-1963), during the dawn of the American Regional Theater movement. He quickly rose from technical manager to Associate Producer. He was already prominent enough to be put forward as a potential founding member of the APA-Phoenix, an early link between regional theater and Broadway.

He was production manager for the inaugurations of U.S. Presidents Richard Nixon and Jimmy Carter, and for massive stage events like Einstein on the Beach, and U.S. tours by the Bolshoi Opera and Bolshoi Ballet. Other large-scale events for which he handled both Production Management and Lighting included American tours of The Performing Arts Company of the People's Republic of China, Stuttgart Ballet, and National Ballet of Cuba

But he is best known for his work as a lighting designer on Broadway, at numerous regional theatres, dance companies, New York City Opera, Miami Opera, Chicago Lyric Opera, Wolf Trap Opera, Opera Company of Boston, and as the lighting director at the New York City Opera. Hemsley taught lighting design at the University of Wisconsin–Madison and was celebrated there for his generosity with students, many of whom served as assistants at New York City Opera and elsewhere.

He died in 1983.

== Legacy ==
A 150-seat black box theatre on the UW campus is named for him. A notable attendee of his memorial service in New York City was Beverly Sills, who announced the establishment in Hemsley's name of apprenticeship funds at New York City Opera and at Wisconsin. A not-for-profit was set up to continue his legacy of training and career opportunities for early-career lighting designers.

Many of his students, assistants, and mentorship-beneficiaries have gone on to careers (including directing and management, as well as design) at the major performing arts producing organizations in the United States. These include New York City Opera, New York City Ballet, Chicago Lyric Opera, The George Balanchine Trust, Public Broadcasting System, and various Broadway shows. Even non-technical theater students recall his influence on their career, like actor Tom Wopat. Hemsley outlined his teaching philosophy in conference panels on which he participated.
