= Kenneth Posner =

American lighting designer

- Education: Boston University; State University of New York, Purchase (BFA)
- Occupation: Lighting designer
- Years active: 1988-present
- Known for: Wicked; Hairspray
- Awards: Tony Award for Best Lighting Design in a Play

Kenneth Posner is an American lighting designer, working on Broadway, Off-Broadway, and in American regional theatre. His most notable designs include the musicals Wicked and Hairspray, two highly regarded musicals of the early 21st century. In 2007, he won the Tony Award for Best Lighting Design in a Play for his work on The Coast of Utopia (Part 2 - Shipwreck).

== Career and education ==
He has been nominated for the Tony Award for Best Lighting Design 11 times and won once for The Coast of Utopia (Part 2 - Shipwreck) in 2011. His nominations have included nods for Merchant of Venice (2011), Dirty Rotten Scoundrels (2005), Wicked (2004), Hairspray (2003), and The Adventures of Tom Sawyer (2001). He has also been nominated 10 times for the Drama Desk Award for Outstanding Lighting Design and received an Obie Award for Sustained Excellence in Lighting in 2003. In 2013, Posner achieved a near-sweep of the nominations for the Tony Award for Best Lighting Design of a Musical, garnering nods in three of the four eligible slots (for Kinky Boots, Pippin, and Rodgers + Hammerstein's Cinderella), though he lost to Matilda The Musical.

Posner was educated at SUNY Purchase, where Brian MacDevitt also attended. He is a 1983 graduate of Eastchester High School in Eastchester, New York. He also attended Boston University College of Fine Arts.

== Personal life ==
He is currently a resident of Verona, New Jersey and was born in 1966.

== Productions ==
=== Broadway ===
- The Rose Tattoo – 1995
- The Father – 1996
- Getting Away With Murder – 1996
- The Rehearsal – 1996
- The Last Night of Ballyhoo – 1997
- The Little Foxes – 1997
- A View From the Bridge – 1997
- Side Man – 1998
- Little Me – 1998
- You're a Good Man, Charlie Brown – 1999
- The Lion in Winter – 1999
- Swing! – 1999
- Uncle Vanya – 2000
- The Adventures of Tom Sawyer – 2001
- The Goat, or Who Is Sylvia? – 2002
- The Smell of the Kill – 2002
- The Man Who Had All the Luck – 2002
- Hairspray – 2002
- Imaginary Friends – 2002
- Wicked – 2003
- Oldest Living Confederate Widow Tells All – 2003
- The Frogs – 2004
- Little Women – 2005
- Dirty Rotten Scoundrels – 2005
- Glengarry Glen Ross – 2005
- The Odd Couple – 2005
- Lestat – 2005
- The Coast of Utopia (Part 2 - Shipwreck) – 2006
- The Pirate Queen – 2007
- Legally Blonde – 2007
- Grease – 2007
- The Homecoming – 2007
- 9 to 5 – 2009
- The Royal Family – 2009
- The Miracle Worker – 2010
- Lend Me a Tenor – 2010
- Mrs. Warren's Profession – 2010
- A Life in the Theatre – 2010
- The Merchant of Venice – 2010
- Elling – 2010
- Catch Me if You Can – 2010
- Relatively Speaking – 2011
- Other Desert Cities – 2011
- Gore Vidal's The Best Man – 2012
- The Columnist – 2012
- Harvey – 2012
- Rogers + Hammerstein's Cinderella – 2013
- Kinky Boots – 2013
- Pippin – 2013
- If/Then – 2014
- Disgraced – 2014
- Finding Neverland – 2015
- On Your Feet! – 2015
- Tuck Everlasting – 2016
- War Paint – 2017
- John Lithgow: Stories by Heart – 2018
- Mean Girls – 2018
- Pretty Woman: The Musical – 2018
- Beetlejuice – 2019
- Take Me Out – 2021

=== Touring ===
- Swing! (2000-2001)
- Hairspray (2003-2006)
- Wicked Tours
  - Emerald City Tour (2005-2015)
  - Chicago Tour (2005-2009)
  - Los Angeles Tour (2007-2009)
  - San Francisco Tour (2009-2010)
  - Munchkinland Tour (2009–present)
- Little Women (2005-2006)
- Dirty Rotten Scoundrels (2006-2007)
- Grease (2008-2010)
- Kinky Boots (2014-2017)
- Pippin (2014-2016)
- Rogers + Hammerstein's Cinderella (2014-2016)
- If/Then (2015-2016)
- Finding Neverland (2016-2018)
- On Your Feet! (2017-2019)
- Mean Girls (2019–present)
- Pretty Woman: The Musical (upcoming)

=== West End ===
- Hairspray – 2007
- Legally Blonde – 2010
- Kinky Boots – 2015
- On Your Feet! – 2019
- Wicked – 2021
- Pretty Woman: The Musical – 2021
- BeetleJuice The Musical - 2026 - Present

=== Off-Broadway ===
- Emerald City – 1988
- Come As You Are – 1990
- Machinal – 1990
- Walking the Dead – 1991
- Ruthless! – 1992
- Spike Heels – 1992
- Flaubert's Latest – 1992
- The Madame MacAdam Traveling Theatre – 1992
- On the Bum – 1992
- On the Open Road – 1993
- Sophistry – 1993
- Time on Fire – 1993
- Marisol (play) – 1993
- Johnny Pye and the Fool-Killer – 1993
- The Swan – 1994
- Suburbia – 1994
- A Cheever Evening – 1994
- The Scarlett Letter – 1994
- The Rose Tattoo – 1995
- The Radical Mystique – 1995
- Endgame – 1995
- Wake Up, I'm Fat– 1995
- Cowgirls – 1996
- The Blues Are Running – 1996
- Nine Armenians – 1996
- Dealer's Choice – 1997
- Collected Stories – 1997
- As Bees In Honey Drown – 1997
- Misalliance – 1997
- Pride's Crossing – 1997
- Side Man – 1998
- Labor Day – 1998
- 2.5 Minute Ride – 1999
- That Championship Season – 1999
- The Author's Voice & Imagining Brad – 1999
- Give Me Your Answer, Do! – 1999
- The Play About the Baby – 2000
- The Wild Party – 2000
- The Altruists – 2000
- The Waverly Gallery – 2000
- The Winter's Tale – 2000
- The Credeaux Canvas – 2001
- Tick, Tick... Boom! – 2001
- Music from a Sparkling Planet – 2001
- Hobson's Choice – 2002
- Monster – 2002
- F-ing A – 2003
- A Little Night Music – 2003
- Valhalla – 2004
- Can-Can – 2004
- Entertaining Mr. Sloane – 2006
- Satellites – 2006
- Parlour Song – 2008
- The New Century – 2008
- Good Boys and True – 2008
- The Savannah Disputation – 2008
- The Toxic Avenger – 2009
- Our House – 2009
- The Understudy – 2009
- Mr. and Mrs. Fitch – 2010
- Me, Myself & I – 2010
- Other Desert Cities – 2011
- Death Takes a Holiday – 2011
- If I Forget – 2017
- A Parallelogram – 2017
- Amy and the Orphans – 2018
- Long Lost – 2019
- The Perplexed – 2020

== Awards and nominations ==
=== Tony Awards ===
Year	Category	Work	Result
2001	Best Lighting Design	The Adventures of Tom Sawyer	Nominated
2003	Best Lighting Design	Hairspray	Nominated
2004	Best Lighting Design	Wicked	Nominated
2005	Best Lighting Design in a Musical	Dirty Rotten Scoundrels	Nominated
2007	Best Lighting Design in a Play	The Coast Of Utopia (Part 2 - Shipwreck)	Won
2011	Best Lighting Design in a Play	The Merchant of Venice	Nominated
2012	Best Lighting Design in a Play	Other Desert Cities	Nominated
2013	Best Lighting Design in a Musical	Kinky Boots	Nominated
2013	Best Lighting Design in a Musical	Rogers and Hammerstein's Cinderella	Nominated
2013	Best Lighting Design in a Musical	Pippin	Nominated
2019	Best Lighting Design in a Musical	Beetlejuice	Nominated

=== Drama Desk Awards ===
Year	Category	Work	Result
1991	Outstanding Lighting Design	Machinal	Nominated
1998	Outstanding Lighting Design	Pride's Crossing	Nominated
1998	Outstanding Lighting Design	A View From the Bridge	Nominated
2000	Outstanding Lighting Design	The Wild Party	Nominated
2001	Outstanding Lighting Design	The Adventures of Tom Sawyer	Nominated
2002	Outstanding Lighting Design	Monster	Nominated
2004	Outstanding Lighting Design	Wicked	Nominated
2007	Outstanding Lighting Design	The Coast Of Utopia (Part 2 - Shipwreck)	Won
2009	Outstanding Lighting Design	9 to 5	Nominated
2012	Outstanding Lighting Design	Death Takes a Holiday	Nominated
2013	Outstanding Lighting Design	Pippin	Nominated

=== Obie Award ===
Year	Category	Work	Result
2003	Sustained Excellence in Lighting		Won
