= Kevin Rigdon =

Kevin Rigdon (born February 17, 1956, in Pontiac, Michigan, United States) is a scenic designer, lighting designer. He teaches at the University of Houston, and is the Associate Director/Design for Houston ’s Alley Theatre.

== Life ==
Rigdon's career in theatre began in 1974, when he joined classmates Gary Sinise and Jeff Perry as the resident designer for the newly formed Steppenwolf Theatre Company. Since then, Rigdon has designed over 345 productions including several productions for Broadway, Alley Theatre, and several other theaters around the world.

Rigdon has been honored with two Tony Award nominations, seven Joseph Jefferson Awards, four Drama Desk Awards, 1986; 1990 American Theatre Wing Design Awards, and a Drama-Logue Award. In 2003, his designs for American Buffalo were exhibited in Prague, Czech Republic as a part of the United States National Exhibit of the Prague Quadrennial Sceneography Exposition.

Rigdon is a member of United Scenic Artists Local 829.
