= Jen Schriever =

American lighting designer

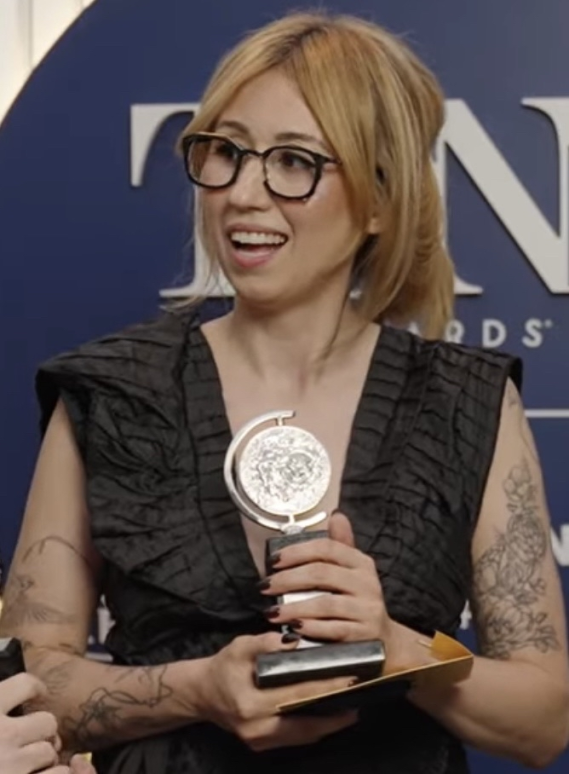
- Schriever in 2026
- Education: Purchase College
- Occupation: Lighting designer

Jen Schriever is an American lighting designer. She won a Tony Award and was nominated for two more in the category Best Lighting Design for the musicals A Strange Loop and The Lost Boys, and the play Death of a Salesman.
