= Richard Nelson (lighting designer) =

American theatrical lighting designer (1938–1996)

Richard Nelson (December 7, 1938 – November 6, 1996) was an American theatrical lighting designer.

Born in New York City, Nelson studied at the High School of the Performing Arts and began his career off-Broadway in 1955. He made his Broadway debut with The Caucasian Chalk Circle in 1966. His many credits include Coco, The Magic Show, So Long, 174th Street, The Lady From Dubuque, The Tap Dance Kid, Sunday in the Park with George, Into the Woods, and revivals of Morning's at Seven, Awake and Sing!, Long Day's Journey Into Night, Blithe Spirit, The Night of the Iguana, and Private Lives, among others.

Nelson won the Tony Award for Best Lighting Design and the Drama Desk Award for Outstanding Lighting Design for Sunday in the Park with George and was nominated for both awards for Into the Woods. He also designed the lighting for the Ronald Reagan Memorial Library in Simi Valley, California.

In addition to his theatre work, Nelson helped define the use of light as an important element in modern dance. He worked with such choreographers as Martha Graham, Paul Taylor, Twyla Tharp and Erick Hawkins. Nelson was the resident lighting designer for the Merce Cunningham Dance Company from 1968 to 1973. He was an associate professor of theater at the University of Michigan in Ann Arbor from 1988 to 1991 and taught at the Tisch School of the Arts at New York University until a month prior to his death from a brain tumor at Mount Sinai Hospital in Manhattan.
