= City of Angels (musical) =

Musical comedy

- Original Broadway Playbill
- Music: Cy Coleman
- Lyrics: David Zippel
- Book: Larry Gelbart
- Productions: 1989 Broadway; 1993 West End; 2014 West End Revival
- Awards: Tony Award for Best Musical; Tony Award for Best Book; Tony Award for Best Score; Olivier Award for Best New Musical; Oliver Award for Best Musical Revival

City of Angels is a satirical musical comedy with music by Cy Coleman, lyrics by David Zippel, and a book by Larry Gelbart. The show takes a critical look at Hollywood through the eyes of Stine, a successful writer who is adapting his latest novel into a film. The musical explores two parallel storylines: one following Stine's struggles to adapt his novel, and the other taking place within the world of the film he's creating. The musical also serves an ode to the classic film noir genre of the 1940s.

== Productions ==
Broadway

City of Angels premiered on Broadway at the Virginia Theatre on December 11, 1989 and closed on January 19, 1992 after 879 performances and 24 previews. It was directed by Michael Blakemore with sets designed by Robin Wagner, costumes by Florence Klotz and lighting by Paul Gallo.

US Tour

While the show continued on Broadway, the Los Angeles company opened in June 1991 at the Shubert Theater in Century City, with Stephen Bogardus as Stine, Lauren Mitchell as the villainess, with Randy Graff (Friday Oolie) and James Naughton (Stone) reprising their original roles. Jeff McCarthy replaced Naughton and Catherine Cox replaced Graff in the Costa Mesa production. This production, along with the Los Angeles cast, played at the Orange County Performing Arts Center in Costa Mesa, California from October 1991 through November 10, 1991.

The production was revamped and embarked on a national tour, with Barry Williams in the role of Stone. Jordan Leeds was chosen from the tour's ensemble to play Stine, and Betsy Joslyn played the two secretaries. The tour played venues including the Tampa Bay Performing Arts Center in Tampa, Florida (February 1992); the National Theatre in Washington, D.C. (June 1992); the Ordway in Saint Paul, Minnesota (August 1992); the Crouse-Hinds Concert Theatre in Syracuse, New York (November 1992); and the Forrest Theatre in Philadelphia, Pennsylvania (November 1992).

West End

The musical opened in the West End at the Prince of Wales Theatre in March 1993. Blakemore again directed, with Roger Allam as Stone, Martin Smith as Stine, and Henry Goodman as Buddy Fidler. The Los Angeles Times reported "...it was announced that the production here of 'City of Angels'....was closing prematurely after four months, despite excellent notices." Frank Rich reported that "the West End production of the Broadway hit 'City of Angels' would close after only a four-month run. 'City of Angels' received rave reviews, and its box-office collapse was blamed on the gravity of the recession and the declining sophistication of West End audiences."

The production was nominated for five 1994 Laurence Olivier Awards: Best Director of a Musical; Best Actor in a Musical (Roger Allam); Best Actress in a Musical (Haydn Gwynne); Best Supporting Performance in a Musical (Henry Goodman); and The American Express Award for Best New Musical, winning for Best New Musical.

The first West End revival was staged at the Donmar Warehouse, opening officially on December 16, 2014 and running till February 2015. Directed by the Donmar Warehouse's artistic director Josie Rourke, the cast included Hadley Fraser as Stine, Tam Mutu as Stone, Rosalie Craig as Gabbi/Bobbi, Katherine Kelly as Alaura/Carla, Rebecca Trehearn as Donna/Oolie and Samantha Barks as Mallory/Avril. This production was nominated for five 2015 Olivier Awards: Magic Radio Best Musical Revival (Winner); White Light Award for Best Lighting Design (Winner); Best Director; Best Costume Design; and XL Video Award for Best Set Design. The production transferred to the Garrick Theatre in the West End beginning previews on 5 March 2020, however closed on 16 March due to the COVID-19 pandemic. The cast included Craig, Fraser and Trehearn reprising their roles from the Donmar production as Gabbi/Bobbi, Stine and Donna/Oolie, with Theo James as Stone, Nicola Roberts as Mallory/Avril and Vanessa Williams as Alaura/Carla.

Other productions

The theatre company Reprise! Broadway's Best production ran in January–February 2006 at Freud Playhouse, UCLA, Los Angeles. The cast featured Burke Moses as Stone, Vicki Lewis as Oolie, Tami Tappan Damiano as Gabby, and Stephen Bogardus as Stine.

The work was presented by Life Like Company at the Arts Centre Melbourne from November 5, 2015 to November 8, 2015, directed by Martin Croft and starring Kane Alexander as Stone, Anton Berezin as Stine, Amanda Harrison as Donna/Oolie and Chelsea Plumley as Gabby/Bobbi.

Porchlight Music Theatre presented City of Angels as a part of "Porchlight Revisits" in Chicago, Illinois in March 2015. It was directed by Christopher Pazdernik with musical direction by Aaron Benham.

== Plot ==
The setting is Hollywood, California in the late 1940s, with two stories occurring simultaneously: a Hollywood comedy and a detective drama. The real-life scenes feature full-color sets and costumes, while the movie scenes are in black-and-white. With the exception of the actors playing Stine and Stone, most of the cast doubles as characters in the "real" world and their fictional counterparts.

=== Act I ===
Stone, a tough Los Angeles private eye, lies on a hospital gurney with a bullet in his shoulder and a lot on his mind. He flashes back to a week earlier, when his loyal Girl Friday secretary, Oolie, ushered in a rich, beautiful woman named Alaura. Alaura claims she wants Stone to find her missing stepdaughter, Mallory Kingsley, a beautiful "bad" girl. Against his better judgment, he takes the case.

A man at a typewriter appears onstage, and Stone and Oolie suddenly back up, "rewind", and play the scene with a few changes. The man at the typewriter is Stine, author of the popular detective novel City of Angels, which he is adapting into a screenplay at the behest of Hollywood producer-director Buddy Fidler. His wife Gabby has misgivings and wishes that he would stick to novels, but for now, Stine is enjoying the ride.

We begin to see the interplay between "reality" and fiction as Gabby (in the real world) and Oolie (in the story-within-the-story) lament how their men won't listen to them ("What You Don't Know About Women").

Stone, alone in his dreary bungalow, is listening to the radio: Jimmy Powers and the Angel City 4 are singing "You Gotta Look Out For Yourself". Two thugs break down his door, beat him up, and knock him out. Cut to Buddy Fidler reading this scene in the screenplay: we see that his secretary, Donna, is the model for Oolie, and that Buddy can't help meddling with everything ("The Buddy System").

Stone is rudely awakened by Lieutenant Munoz, who was Stone's partner on the force but now bears him a major grudge. Once, Stone loved a low-rent lounge singer named Bobbi, whom Stine based on Gabby ("With Every Breath I Take"). But Bobbi wanted stardom more than marriage, and when Stone caught her with a Hollywood producer (based on Buddy), tempers flared, a gun went off, and the producer was killed. Munoz has never forgiven Stone for "getting away with murder."

Stone, angry after the beating, confronts Alaura at her mansion and meets several more unsavory characters, including her lustful stepson, her polio-stricken elderly husband, and his quack doctor. Greed and malice hover like smog, but Alaura's charms and bankroll keep Stone on the case ("The Tennis Song"). He fruitlessly pursues the missing Mallory in a scene that recalls a film montage ("Ev'rybody's Gotta Be Somewhere"), only to find her waiting naked in his bed ("Lost And Found"). Stone somehow manages to resist temptation—which is more than can be said for his creator. After Gabby returns to New York, Stine takes comfort in Donna's bed.

A photographer breaks into Stone's bungalow and snaps a picture of him with Mallory. She runs off with his gun, which is subsequently used to murder the quack doctor. Stone is framed for the killing; Munoz gleefully arrests him ("All You Have To Do Is Wait").

Stine is having a lousy time of it, too. Buddy is butchering his script, his conscience is nagging him about his infidelity, and Stone, his own creation, is disgusted with him. The curtain falls with each of them arguing, to a swinging big-band accompaniment ("You're Nothing Without Me").

=== Act II ===
In a recording studio, Jimmy Powers and the Angel City 4 are singing "Stay With Me", which then becomes a record playing in a bedroom that looks like Alaura's, but actually belongs to Carla Haywood, Buddy's wife, who will play Alaura in the movie.

Stone languishes in jail, attended only by Oolie, who like her alter ego, Donna, is feeling used by men ("You Can Always Count On Me"). Stone is mysteriously bailed out, but the two hoods catch up with him and nearly blow him up before he neatly turns the tables.

Stine has troubles of his own. Lonely at a Hollywood party of Buddy's sycophants, including a Hollywood composer ("Alaura's Theme"), Stine phones home only to find that Gabby has discovered that he cheated on her. He flies to New York with an elaborately prepared excuse, but she's not buying it ("It Needs Work").

Stone, fighting to clear his name, is led to a brothel ("LA Blues") where he is stunned to find Bobbi. We learn it was she who shot the producer; Stone has been covering for her all this time. Together, they face the wreckage of their love ("With Every Breath I Take").

In Hollywood, Stine is approached by a young starlet, Avril, who will be playing Mallory. She begs him to reconsider killing off Mallory near the end. He says he'll think about it.

Oolie, meanwhile, has discovered that Alaura is a fortune hunter who has already murdered one rich husband and is planning to do away with this one, once she had eliminated his son, daughter, and doctor. She tried to get her stepson, Peter, to kill the doctor and Mallory, but he couldn't bring himself to kill. Stone confronts her at the mansion; they grapple for her gun; shots ring out. Alaura falls dead, Stone is gravely wounded, and we're back where we started.

But where does that leave Stine? Gabby has rejected him and his lover, Donna, has been rewriting his script. Stine faces the collapse of his real and fictive worlds, and as his emotions take over, his wit turns bitter ("Funny"). When Stine arrives on the movie set to find that Buddy's name appears above his on the screenplay, and that the shallow crooner Jimmy Powers will play Stone, Stine boils over. With the "real" Stone, his conscience, finally leading him to make the right choice, he rages at Buddy, gets himself fired, and is about to get beat up by two security guards when Stone somehow appears at Stine's typewriter and writes him the fighting skills of a superhero, then tacks on a "Hollywood ending" in which Gabby returns, forgiving all. Together they celebrate ("I'm Nothing Without You") as the curtain falls.

== Musical numbers ==
Act I

- Prologue: Theme from City of Angels
- "Double Talk" – Stone and Alaura Kingsley
- "Double Talk" – Buddy Fidler and Stine
- "What You Don't Know About Women" – Gabby and Oolie
- "Ya Gotta Look Out for Yourself" – Jimmy Powers and Angel City 4
- "The Buddy System" – Buddy Fidler
- "With Every Breath I Take" – Bobbi
- "The Tennis Song" – Stone and Alaura Kingsley
- "Ev'rybody's Gotta Be Somewhere" – Stone and Angel City 4
- "Lost and Found" – Mallory Kingsley
- "All Ya Have to Do is Wait" – Munoz, Yamato, Mahoney and Officer Pasco
- "You're Nothing Without Me" – Stine and Stone

Act II

- "Stay with Me" – Jimmy Powers and Angel City 4
- "You Can Always Count On Me" – Oolie and Donna
- "The Party & Alaura's Theme" – Buddy Fidler and Party Guests
- "It Needs Work" – Gabby
- "L.A. Blues" - Stone
- "With Every Breath I Take" – Stone and Bobbi
- "Funny" – Stine
- "I'm Nothing Without You" – Stone, Stine and Gabby
- Epilogue: Theme from City of Angels
- Double Talk Walk (Curtain Call)

== Broadway cast and characters ==
Actor	Hollywood	Movie
James Naughton	—N/a	Stone
Gregg Edelman	Stine	—N/a
René Auberjonois	Buddy Fidler	Irwin S. Irving
Shawn Elliott	Pancho Vargas	Munoz
Randy Graff	Donna	Oolie
Dee Hoty	Carla Haywood	Alaura Kingsley
Kay McClelland	Gabby	Bobbi
Rachel York	Avril	Mallory
James Cahill	Barber	Dr. Mandril
Carolee Carmello	Stand-In	Margaret
Scott Waara	Jimmy Powers	—N/a
Amy London	Angel City 4 soprano	—N/a
Jackie Presti	Angel City 4 alto	—N/a
Peter Davis	Angel City 4 tenor	—N/a
Gary Kahn	Angel City 4 bass	—N/a

== London 2014/15 cast and characters ==
Actor	Hollywood	Movie
Tam Mutu	—N/a	Stone
Hadley Fraser	Stine	—N/a
Peter Polycarpou	Buddy Fidler	Irwin S. Irving
Marc Elliott	Pancho Vargas	Munoz
Rebecca Trehearn	Donna	Oolie
Katherine Kelly	Carla Haywood	Alaura Kingsley
Rosalie Craig	Gabby	Bobbi
Samantha Barks	Avril	Mallory
Tim Walton	Jimmy Powers	Dr. Mandril
Nick Cavaliere	—N/a	Sonny
Adam Fogerty	—N/a	Big Six
Cameron Cuffe	—N/a	Peter Kingsley
Mark Penfold	—N/a	Luther Kingsley
Sandra Marvin	—N/a	Angel City Four (Soprano)
Jennifer Saayeng	—N/a	Angel City Four (Alto)
Kadiff Kirwan	—N/a	Angel City Four (Tenor)
Jo Servi	—N/a	Angel City Four (Bass)

== Characters ==
=== Hollywood cast ===
- Stine - The author of the novel City of Angels, which he is adapting into a film.
- Gabby - Stine's wife (The actress playing Gabby also plays Bobbi.)
- Donna - Buddy's secretary (The actress playing Oolie also plays Donna.)
- Carla Haywood - Buddy's wife, who will be playing Alaura in the film. She is having an affair with Jimmy Powers. (The actress playing Carla also plays Alaura.)
- Avril - A young Hollywood starlet who will be playing Mallory in the film. She is having an affair with Buddy. (The actress playing Avril also plays Mallory.)
- Buddy - The film producer. He is changing the integrity of the novel. He is married to Carla and having an affair with Avril. (The actor playing Buddy also plays Irwin.)
- Pancho Vargas - The actor playing Munoz in the film.
- Gerald Pierce - The actor playing Peter Kingsley in the film.
- Werner Kriegler - The actor playing Luther Kingsley in the film.
- Jimmy Powers - A popular singer, who appears in both the Hollywood scenes and in the fictional movie scenes. In the real world, Powers is having an affair with Carla.
- The Angel City 4 - Jimmy Powers' back-up singers, a close-harmony quartet who serve as a Greek chorus in the film world.
- Two Studio Guards, played by the same actors who play Sonny and Big Six

=== Movie cast ===
- Stone - A former police cop turned private eye detective, the hero of Stine's novel. The classic hard-boiled detective, who is hired to find Mallory Kingsley. Tough, wisecracking and quick-witted. He is irresistible to women, but only has room in his heart for the woman he has lost.
- Alaura Kingsley - A femme fatale trophy wife. She comes to Stone to have him find her missing step-daughter, but, it turns out that this is all a plot for Alaura to kill her step-children to take her soon-to-be late husband's money. She and Stone have a brief affair. She is shot and killed in a struggle with Stone. (The actress playing Alaura also plays Carla.)
- Bobbi - Stone's former girlfriend, A nightclub singer based directly on Stine's wife Gabby. (The actress playing Gabby also plays Bobbi.)
- Oolie - Stone's loyal Girl Friday. Unrequitedly in love with Stone, she goes to great lengths to protect and aid him. (The actress playing Oolie also plays Donna.)
- Mallory Kingsley - Alaura's beautiful, seductive step-daughter, whom Stone is hired to find. (The actress playing Mallory also plays Avril.)
- Detective Munoz - Stone's former partner, now a bitter rival. He believes that Stone repeatedly antagonizes him. His hatred of Stone has a racial element that Buddy Fiddler demands be deleted from the screenplay. (The actor playing Munoz also plays Pancho.)
- Irwin S. Irving - A Hollywood mogul Stone catches in bed with Bobbi. Inspired by Buddy. (The actor playing Irwin also plays Buddy.)
- Dr. Mandrill - A quack doctor hired by Alaura to care for Luther. He is later killed, seemingly by Peter, but really by Alaura.
- Luther Kingsley - Alaura's husband, Mallory and Peter's father. He is suffering from polio and encased in an iron lung. He dotes on Mallory.
- Peter Kingsley - Luther's son and Mallory's brother. He and Alaura concoct a scheme to kill Dr Mandrill, Luther, and Mallory to take all of the inheritance. He, however, cannot bring himself to kill, turning on Alaura.
- Jimmy Powers - A popular singer, who appears in both the Hollywood scenes and in the fictional movie scenes. In the real world, Powers is having an affair with Carla.
- The Angel City 4 - Jimmy Powers' back-up singers, a close-harmony quartet who serve as a Greek chorus in the film world.

== Recordings ==
There are recordings of the original Broadway cast on Sony (ASIN: B00000272K), released on February 9, 1990, and the London original cast on RCA (ASIN: B000003FN9), released October 12, 1993.

== Critical response ==
Frank Rich wrote in his review in The New York Times: "...how long has it been since a musical was brought to a halt by riotous jokes?...This is an evening in which even a throwaway wisecrack spreads laughter like wildfire through the house, until finally the roars from the balcony merge with those from the orchestra and the pandemonium takes on a life of its own.... There is no end to the cleverness with which the creators of City of Angels carry out their stunt of double vision, starting with a twin cast list (a Hollywood Cast and a Movie Cast) in the Playbill....Mr. Coleman's score - a delirious celebration of jazz and pop styles sumptuously orchestrated by Billy Byers..."

An article about Frank Rich in the Deseret News noted: "But a rave from Rich can translate quickly into box office dollars. 'City of Angels,' a new musical without big stars, was taking in about $18,000 a day in advance ticket sales before it opened, according to general manager Ralph Roseman. The day after it opened to mixed reviews - but lavish praise from Rich - the box office take was $324,700."

Of the 2014 production at the Donmar, Matt Trueman from Variety wrote: "Gelbart makes his point early and his ciphers can't sustain a second act that gets itself tangled. Small matter, given the style on show. Practically every other line cracks a laugh, and Coleman's authentic jazz score is rich and infectious, combining variety with real integrity. Robert Jones's crisp greyscale design, artfully lit by Howard Harrison, and Duncan Mclean's colorful projections match them for class."

== Awards and nominations ==
=== Original Broadway production ===
Year	Award	Category	Nominee	Result
1990	Tony Award	Best Musical		Won
1990	Tony Award	Best Book of a Musical	Larry Gelbart	Won
1990	Tony Award	Best Original Score	Cy Coleman and David Zippel	Won
1990	Tony Award	Best Performance by a Leading Actor in a Musical	James Naughton	Won
1990	Tony Award	Best Performance by a Leading Actor in a Musical	Gregg Edelman	Nominated
1990	Tony Award	Best Performance by a Featured Actor in a Musical	René Auberjonois	Nominated
1990	Tony Award	Best Performance by a Featured Actress in a Musical	Randy Graff	Won
1990	Tony Award	Best Direction of a Musical	Michael Blakemore	Nominated
1990	Tony Award	Best Scenic Design	Robin Wagner	Won
1990	Tony Award	Best Costume Design	Florence Klotz	Nominated
1990	Tony Award	Best Lighting Design	Paul Gallo	Nominated
1990	Drama Desk Award	Outstanding Musical		Won
1990	Drama Desk Award	Outstanding Book of a Musical	Larry Gelbart	Won
1990	Drama Desk Award	Outstanding Actor in a Musical	James Naughton	Won
1990	Drama Desk Award	Outstanding Featured Actor in a Musical	René Auberjonois	Nominated
1990	Drama Desk Award	Outstanding Featured Actress in a Musical	Randy Graff	Won
1990	Drama Desk Award	Outstanding Director of a Musical	Michael Blakemore	Nominated
1990	Drama Desk Award	Outstanding Orchestrations	Billy Byers	Won
1990	Drama Desk Award	Outstanding Lyrics	David Zippel	Won
1990	Drama Desk Award	Outstanding Music	Cy Coleman	Won
1990	Drama Desk Award	Outstanding Set Design	Robin Wagner	Won
1990	Drama Desk Award	Outstanding Costume Design	Florence Klotz	Nominated
1990	Drama Desk Award	Outstanding Lighting Design	Paul Gallo	Nominated
1990	Edgar Award	Best Play	Larry Gelbart	Won
1990	New York Drama Critics' Circle Award	Best Musical	Cy Coleman, David Zippel and Larry Gelbart	Won

=== Original London production ===
Year	Award	Category	Nominee	Result
1994	Laurence Olivier Award	Best New Musical		Won
1994	Laurence Olivier Award	Best Actor in a Musical	Roger Allam	Nominated
1994	Laurence Olivier Award	Best Actress in a Musical	Haydn Gwynne	Nominated
1994	Laurence Olivier Award	Best Performance in a Supporting Role in a Musical	Henry Goodman	Nominated
1994	Laurence Olivier Award	Best Director of a Musical	Michael Blakemore	Nominated

=== London revival ===
Year	Award	Category	Nominee	Result
2015	Laurence Olivier Award	Best Musical Revival		Won
2015	Laurence Olivier Award	Best Director	Josie Rourke	Nominated
2015	Laurence Olivier Award	Best Set Design	Robert Jones	Nominated
2015	Laurence Olivier Award	Best Costume Design	Robert Jones	Nominated
2015	Laurence Olivier Award	Best Lighting Design	Howard Harrison	Won

== Film adaptation ==
In June 2009, a film adaptation of City of Angels was announced with Barry Levinson as director.
