= They're Playing Our Song =

1978 musical

- Original Cast Recording
- Music: Marvin Hamlisch
- Lyrics: Carole Bayer Sager
- Book: Neil Simon
- Basis: Relationship between Carole Bayer Sager and Marvin Hamlisch
- Productions: 1978 Los Angeles (tryout); 1979 Broadway; 1979 North American tour 1980 West End; 1981 North American tour

They're Playing Our Song is a musical with a book by Neil Simon, lyrics by Carole Bayer Sager, and music by Marvin Hamlisch.

In a story based on the real-life relationship of Hamlisch and Sager, a wisecracking composer finds a new, offbeat lyricist, but initially the match is not one made in heaven. The two undergo a series of trials and overcome a number of hurdles before finding true love by the final curtain.

They're Playing Our Song is essentially a two-character show. Vernon and Sonia are the sole characters on stage; each character has a three-person Greek chorus acting as their inner voices, and there are no big production numbers.

== Productions ==
Produced by Emanuel Azenberg, the musical had its world premiere at the Ahmanson Theatre in Los Angeles in December 1978.

The musical opened on Broadway at the Imperial Theatre on February 11, 1979, where it ran for 1,082 performances and 11 previews. Directed by Robert Moore and choreographed by Patricia Birch, the cast starred Robert Klein and Lucie Arnaz (in her Broadway debut). Douglas W. Schmidt designed the scenery and projections, Ann Roth designed the costumes and lighting was by Tharon Musser. Notable cast replacements included Tony Roberts, Stockard Channing, Victor Garber, Anita Gillette, John Hillner, Diana Canova and Ted Wass. An original cast recording was released by Casablanca Records.

Film rights were purchased by Rastar Films in late 1979. Producer Ray Stark planned a 1982 release through Columbia Pictures with new songs contributed by Hamlisch and Sager. The film, however, was never produced.

The first U.S. national tour opened in 1979 with Victor Garber and Ellen Greene.

The original Australian production opened on August 23, 1980, at the Theatre Royal in Sydney. It starred John Waters and Jacki Weaver, with Rhonda Burchmore as one of the "Inner Voices." An Australian Cast Recording was released by Festival Records.

The musical opened in the West End on October 1, 1980, at the Shaftesbury Theatre with Tom Conti and Gemma Craven, who won a 1980 Laurence Olivier Award for Actress of the Year in a Musical. Among the "Inner Voices" was Deena Payne. According to the history of the Shaftesbury Theatre, "The most successful production during this time was the musical They're Playing Our Song (1980), starring Tom Conti and Gemma Craven, which ran for nearly two years." Notable replacements during its original London run included Martin Shaw and Diana Terry. It closed on May 8, 1982. A London cast recording was released on the Chopper label.

An Argentinian production opened in 1980, starring Valeria Lynch and Victor Laplace. The Argentinian cast recording was released by Philips.

In 1981 Civic Theatre of San Juan, Puerto Rico staged a production at the Luis A Ferré Fine Arts Center (Centro de Bellas Artes), produced by Olga Alicea and directed by Dianne de Castro Crommett. The lead roles were played by real life couple Glen Monroig and Camille Carrión. They later produced a Spanish language version of the musical.

In February 1982, the musical opened in Czechoslovakia (behind the Iron Curtain) at Prague’s Semafor Theater. The lead roles were played by popular actors Jiří Suchý and Jitka Molavcová.The production was a success and ran for five years.

The Singapore Repertory Theater production opened in the Philippines, from July 2000 to August 13. It starred Tony Award winner Lea Salonga as Sonia and Singaporean actor Adrian Pang as Vernon. The musical ran in the AFP Theatre.

A production opened at the Menier Chocolate Factory on August 4, 2008, to mixed reviews and closed on September 28. It starred How Do You Solve a Problem Like Maria? winner Connie Fisher and Alistair McGowan.

A Brazilian production opened in March 2009, starring Tadeu Aguiar and Amanda Acosta.

On August 30, 2010, Seth Rudetsky and Sutton Foster starred in a one-night only Actors Fund benefit performance of the show at the Gerald W. Lynch Theatre.

In fall of 2010, the Reprise Theatre Company in Los Angeles staged a production starring Jason Alexander and Stephanie J. Block.

A Hungarian version titled Kapj el! (after the song "Fallin'") played in Békéscsaba, Hungary, in 2011. The production, directed by Zoltán Seregi and choreographed by Judit Kerekes, starred Anna Balogh as Sonia and György Szomor as Vernon.

Porchlight Music Theatre presented They're Playing Our Song as a part of their "Porchlight Revisits" season where they stage forgotten musicals three times per year. This production was in Chicago, Illinois in March 2018. It was directed and choreographed by Christopher Carter and music directed by Andra Velis Simon.

Hayes Theatre in Sydney, Australia presented They're Playing Our Song as part of their "Neglected Musical" series in 2024. Neglected Musicals is a theatre initiative dedicated to presenting musical theatre that has never (or rarely) been seen in Australia. The musicals are presented with scripts in hand, and with piano accompaniment after only a day’s rehearsal.

A Spanish-language production directed by Antonio Banderas ran from June 6 to July 21, 2024 at the Teatro del Soho in Málaga, starring Miquel Fernández as Vernon Gersch and María Adamuz as Sonia Walsk.

== Synopsis ==
=== Act I ===
Top pop music composer Vernon Gersch, hoping to find a new collaborator, meets offbeat Sonia Walsk, who has already had some success writing lyrics and is in awe of his accomplishments, at his luxury Manhattan apartment. She is surprised that his Oscar is so light, and Vernon quips, "They're chocolate inside." He is aloof and focused, while she is disorganized and distracted, but Vernon has already written music to one of Sonia's lyrics, and they decide to forge ahead. Sonia, frazzled by her break up with lover Leon, arrives a day late for their first work session. When they begin, she tells Vernon they should get to know each other on a personal level in order for their work to gel, and they decide to have dinner at "Le Club."

Sonia, who has been trying to ease Leon's anguish, is late yet again, and the evening begins badly. She and Vernon argue, then dance in an effort to calm down. The two settle down to enjoy the evening, and they hear their own songs being played over the sound system. Another work session, in which the two really don't listen to each other, follows, but Vernon convinces Sonia to join him for a romantic weekend at a Long Island beach house. The trip to the island in Vernon's small sports car is fraught with engine trouble, calls to Leon, and arguments. They finally arrive at the house, but a phone call from Leon threatens the romantic mood. Determined to concentrate on Vernon, Sonia tells Leon that she can't help him and hangs up.

=== Act II ===
It's a week later and Vernon is suffering from insomnia. Sonia manipulates her way into his apartment by telling him she has no place to stay since Leon is back living at her place. Sonia and Vernon's romance and collaboration seems successful for a while, but the relationship begins to crumble because of her inability to send her ex-boyfriend away. Also, away from his piano, Vernon is a bundle of neuroses and unable to express his deepest feelings. After some psychologizing about the difficulties of living and working together, the pair split up at a recording session.

A few months later, while Vernon is in a Los Angeles hospital, Sonia arrives unexpectedly with a tiny red child's piano as a get-well gift. Months later, both have separately come to the realization that, despite their differences, they are better together. Vernon arrives at Sonia's apartment in New York to tell her that he wants to try again. She agrees, and they reconcile with a kiss.

== Original casts ==
	Broadway (1979)	1st North American tour (1979)	West End (1980)	2nd North American tour (1981)
Vernon Gersch	Robert Klein	Victor Garber	Tom Conti	John Hammil
Sonia Walsk	Lucie Arnaz	Ellen Greene	Gemma Craven	Lorna Luft
Voices of Vernon Gersch	Wayne Mattson; Andy Roth; Greg Zadikov	Kenneth Bryan; Clint Clifford; Bubba Rambo	Thom Booker; Philip Day; Mark Jefferis	George-Paul Fortuna; Paul Mack; Michael Mitz
Voices of Sonia Walsk	Helen Castillo; Celia Celnik Matthau; Debbie Shapiro	Ivy Austin; Andrea Green; Cheryl Howard	Dawn Hope; Beverley Kay; Deena Payne	Lynne Lamberis; Gail Oscar; Peggy A. Stamper

== Songs ==
=== Act I ===
- "Fallin'" - Vernon
- "Workin' It Out" - Vernon, Sonia, Voices
- "If He Really Knew Me" - Sonia, Vernon
- "They're Playing Our Song" - Vernon, Sonia
- "If He Really Knew Me (Reprise)" - Vernon, Sonia
- "Right" - Sonia, Vernon, Voices
- "Just for Tonight" - Sonia

=== Act II ===
- "When You're in My Arms" - Vernon, Sonia, Voices
- "I Still Believe in Love" - Sonia
- "Fill in the Words" - Vernon, Voices
- "They're Playing Our Song (Reprise)" - Company

=== Charts ===
==== Australia cast recording ====
Chart (1980)	Position
Australia (Kent Music Report)	49

== Awards and nominations ==
=== Original Broadway production ===
Year	Award	Category	Nominee	Result
1979	Tony Award	Best Musical		Nominated
1979	Tony Award	Best Book of a Musical	Neil Simon	Nominated
1979	Tony Award	Best Performance by a Leading Actor in a Musical	Robert Klein	Nominated
1979	Tony Award	Best Direction of a Musical	Robert Moore	Nominated
1979	Drama Desk Award	Outstanding Musical		Nominated
1979	Drama Desk Award	Outstanding Book of a Musical	Neil Simon	Nominated
1979	Drama Desk Award	Outstanding Actress in a Musical	Lucie Arnaz	Nominated
1979	Drama Desk Award	Outstanding Music	Marvin Hamlisch	Nominated
1979	Drama Desk Award	Outstanding Lighting Design	Tharon Musser	Nominated
1979	Theatre World Award		Lucie Arnaz	Won

=== Original London production ===
Year	Award	Category	Nominee	Result
1980	Laurence Olivier Award	Best New Musical		Nominated
1980	Laurence Olivier Award	Best Actor in a Musical	Tom Conti	Nominated
1980	Laurence Olivier Award	Best Actress in a Musical	Gemma Craven	Won
