= Tharon Musser =

American lighting designer (1925–2009)

- Born: January 8, 1925; Roanoke, Virginia, U.S.
- Died: April 19, 2009 (aged 84); Newtown, Connecticut, U.S.
- Education: Berea College (BA); Yale University (MFA)
- Occupation: Lighting designer
- Awards: Tony Award for Best Lighting Design; Drama Desk Award for Outstanding Lighting Design

Tharon Myrene Musser (January 8, 1925 – April 19, 2009) was an American lighting designer who worked on more than 150 Broadway productions. She was termed the "Dean of American Lighting Designers" and is considered one of the pioneers in her field.

Musser was best known for her work on the musicals A Chorus Line and Dreamgirls. A Chorus Line was the first production of Broadway to use a fully computerized lighting console instead of manually operated "piano boards".

== Biography ==
Musser was born in Virginia in 1925. The daughter of a clergyman, she often recalled that her family couldn't afford electricity, so she grew up with candles and gaslights. She graduated from Berea College (Kentucky) in 1946 and later attended Yale University, obtaining her MFA in 1950. Her first Broadway lighting credit was José Quintero's staging of Eugene O'Neill's Long Day's Journey into Night in 1956 at the original Helen Hayes Theatre.

She designed on Broadway from 1956 to 1999 and her long list of credits include Li'l Abner, Shinbone Alley, Once Upon a Mattress, Here's Love, Any Wednesday, Golden Boy, Flora the Red Menace, Kelly, Mame, Hallelujah, Baby!, The Fig Leaves Are Falling, Applause, The Prisoner of Second Avenue, The Creation of the World and Other Business, The Sunshine Boys, A Little Night Music, Romantic Comedy, Mack and Mabel, The Wiz, The Good Doctor, Pacific Overtures, The Act, Chapter Two, They're Playing Our Song, Ballroom, 42nd Street, Brighton Beach Memoirs, Jerry's Girls, The Odd Couple, Biloxi Blues, Lost in Yonkers, The Goodbye Girl, and Laughter on the 23rd Floor.

Musser won her first Tony Award for Best Lighting Design in 1972 for Follies, followed by Tonys for A Chorus Line in 1976 and Dreamgirls in 1982. She was nominated for Applause, A Little Night Music, The Good Doctor, Pacific Overtures, The Act, Ballroom, and 42nd Street. She also won the Drama Desk Award for Outstanding Lighting Design for Dreamgirls.

In 1980 Musser was nominated for a Drama Desk Award for her design of Children of a Lesser God. She was honored as a USITT Distinguished Lighting Designer in 1996.

== Death ==
Musser died on April 19, 2009, aged 84, from complications of Alzheimer's disease in Newtown, Connecticut in the company of her long-time partner Marilyn Rennagel. Two nights later Broadway theatres dimmed their lights to honor her.
