= Peter Kaczorowski =

American theatrical lighting designer (born 1956)

Peter Kaczorowski (born 1956) is an American theatrical lighting designer.

Kaczorowski was born in Buffalo, New York. He is credited with lighting designs for Broadway and off-Broadway shows, as well extensive work in opera. He has been nominated five times for Tony Awards and won the Tony Award for Best Lighting Design for The Producers and the Drama Desk Award for Outstanding Lighting Design for Contact. He is also the recipient of Outer Critics, Drama-Logue, Ovation and Hewes design awards. He was nominated in 2012 for the Tony Award for Best Lighting Design of a Play for The Road to Mecca.

He has more than 50 Broadway plays and musicals to his credit including Beautiful: The Carole King Musical, No Man's Land/Waiting for Godot in rep, Love Letters, The Country House, The Assembled Parties, Nice Work If You Can Get It, Venus in Fur, Wit, Anything Goes, A View From the Bridge, The Pajama Game, Seascape, Who's Afraid of Virginia Woolf?, Wonderful Town, Anna in the Tropics, and revivals of The Music Man and Kiss Me, Kate.

His recent off-Broadway work includes Dada Woof Papa Hot (Lincoln Center Theater), Ripcord (Manhattan Theater Club), How I Learned to Drive for 2nd Stage, Twelfth Night, All's Well, Measure for Measure (Delacorte), School For Lies at CSC, Russian Transport and The Spoils for the New Group, and The Brother/Sister Trilogy at the Public. He continues to work for Lincoln Center Theater, NYSF, MTC, CTG, Encores! and Playwrights Horizons as well as for most leading regional theatres in the US.

His opera work includes productions at the Metropolitan Opera, New York City Opera, LAMCO, San Francisco Opera, Houston Grand Opera, Santa Fe, Seattle, and Opera Theatre of St. Louis. Outside of the US he has worked at the Royal Opera, Scottish Opera, Opera/North, Bonn, Maggio Festival Florence, L'Arena di Verona, Teatrolirico di Cagliari, La Fenice, Teatro Sao Carlos Lisbon.
