= Hugh Vanstone =

British lighting designer

- Born: 8 August 1965 (age 60)
- Education: Exeter School
- Occupation: Lighting designer
- Awards: Laurence Olivier Award (1999, 2001, 2004); Tony Award (2013)

Hugh Vanstone (born 8 August 1965) is one of the UK’s foremost lighting designers. He has lit more than 160 productions, working in all spheres of live performance lighting, as well as exhibitions and architectural projects. His career has taken him all over the world and his work has been recognised with many awards, including a Tony Award for his lighting of Matilda the Musical (West End, Broadway, US Tour, Australia), and the Laurence Olivier Award for Best Lighting Design in 1999, 2001, and 2004.

Hugh Vanstone is an associate artist at The Old Vic. In Matthew Warchus' inaugural season as Artistic Director (2015/2016), he will be lighting Future Conditional, The Master Builder, The Caretaker, and Groundhog Day.

== Early life ==
He was born on 8 August 1965 in Exeter, the son of Jeremy and Marion Vanstone. He attended Exeter School.

== Career ==
Hugh Vanstone trained at the Northcott Theatre, Exeter.

He has designed lighting for numerous London productions, including Shrek! (Theatre Royal, Drury Lane); Ghost the Musical and Matilda the Musical (directed by Matthew Warchus); The Wizard of Oz (2011 musical) (London Palladium); Spamalot (Palace Theatre, London); The Red Lion, Royal Hunt of the Sun (Royal National Theatre); Desperately Seeking Susan (Novello Theatre); Howard Katz (Royal National Theatre) and The Caretaker (Comedy Theatre), both directed by Patrick Marber; Mouth To Mouth, directed by Ian Rickson (Royal Court Theatre and Albery Theatre); The Graduate, directed by Terry Johnson (Gielgud Theatre); Dr Dolittle (Hammersmith Apollo) and Antony and Cleopatra (Royal Shakespeare Company), both directed by Steven Pimlott; Orpheus Descending ( Donmar Warehouse) and The Lady In the Van (Queen's Theatre), both directed by Nicholas Hytner; The Cherry Orchard directed by Trevor Nunn (Royal National Theatre); Juno and the Paycock directed by John Crowley (Donmar Warehouse ); Art (Wyndham's Theatre and Whitehall Theatres),The Unexpected Man (Royal Shakespeare Company, Duchess Theatre) and The Winter’s Tale (Royal Shakespeare Company at Roundhouse (venue)) all directed by Matthew Warchus; Blast! (Apollo, Hammersmith); Cyberjam (Queen's Theatre); and The Blue Room, directed by Sam Mendes (Donmar Warehouse).

He also designed Dance of the Vampires, directed by Roman Polanski in Vienna (1997 and 2009) and the European tour starting in Berlin in 2006.

His opera productions have included Dialogues des Carmélites (English National Opera), Carmen (Opera North) both directed by Phyllida Lloyd; and The Bartered Bride, directed by Nikolaus Lehnhoff (Glyndebourne).

His Broadway credits include: Joseph and the Amazing Technicolor Dreamcoat (1993); Art (1998, Royale Theater);The Blue Room (1998, Cort Theater); Closer (1999, Music Box Theatre); Follies (2001 revival at the Belasco Theater); Blast! (2001, Broadway Theater);The Unexpected Man (Promenade Theater); The Graduate (2002); Uncle Vanya, Twelfth Night and Hamlet (BAM); Life x 3 (2003, Circle in the Square); Bombay Dreams (2004); Spamalot (2005, nominated for a Tony Award); Shrek the Musical (2008 on Broadway); A Steady Rain (2009); Mary Stuart (2009, nominated for a Tony Award); Ghost the Musical (2012, nominated for a Tony Award) and Matilda the Musical (2013, winner of the Tony Award for Best Lighting Design).

He has also designed lighting for plays in Los Angeles, Australia and elsewhere.

== Awards ==
He has received three Olivier Awards for his work in London: for Pacific Overtures (Donmar Warehouse) in 2004, for The Cherry Orchard and The Graduate in 2001, and for The Unexpected Man and The Blue Room in 1999.

Hugh was nominated for a Tony Award in 2005, 2009, 2012, and won a Tony Award for Matilda the Musical in 2013.

== Personal life ==
Hugh Vanstone was born in Exeter. He lives in London with his partner George Stiles.
