= Roger Morgan (designer) =

Roger Morgan is a pioneer in the world of theatre design consulting. He became interested in theatre architecture while a student at Carnegie Mellon University, and worked as an assistant to the scenic designer Jo Mielziner who became the primary influence on his career. He is the Tony Award-winning lighting designer of over 200 plays on and off-Broadway and in regional theater. He founded Sachs Morgan Studio in 1976 to provide comprehensive theatre planning and design services to the performing arts community.

== Awards and honors ==
Studio projects have won national awards in the worlds of theatre and architecture: the Kennedy Center Concert Hall (AIA Award of Excellence in Interior Design); Foxwoods Theatre on 42nd Street (USITT Honor Award); New World Stages in New York City (LUMEN Award for Architectural Lighting), the Pantages Theatre in Hollywood (Los Angeles Conservancy Preservation Award) and Temple Emmanu-El in NYC (IALD Award).

Morgan won both a Tony Award and a Drama Desk Award for his work on The Crucifer of Blood. He has received several other drama desk awards and has received numerous other awards and nominations for his work. Other lighting design credits include Dracula (1977) with Frank Langella and Morgan's partner Ann Sachs on Broadway (for which he was nominated for the 1978 Drama Desk Award, Outstanding Lighting Design); lighting in the current repertoire of Ballet Hispanico. He is co-author of Space for Dance, commissioned in the 1980s by the National Endowment for the Arts, on the design of dance facilities; it is now out of print and considered a classic in the architectural arena. He has been a keynote speaker at USITT, the organization that honored him with a Lifetime Achievement Award (when he was in his 40s), a guest speaker in the Architecture Department at Carnegie Mellon University, and at international theatre conferences in England, Italy, and Poland.

Morgan believes that the job of the Studio is to plan and design theatres that work for their owners, their patrons, and the theatre professionals that use them. And that Studio projects – no matter their size – must create environments that celebrate life's rituals.
