= Pride's Crossing =

- Poster for the Lincoln Center production by James McMullan
- Original language: English
- Written by: Tina Howe

Premiere
- Date: January 1997
- Place: Old Globe Theatre; San Diego, California

Pride's Crossing is a play by Tina Howe. It received the New York Drama Critics Circle Award for Best American Play and was a finalist for the 1997 Pulitzer Prize for Drama.

The play focuses on 90-year-old Mabel Tidings Bigelow, who as a young woman was the first female to swim the English Channel from England to France. In her introduction to the play, Howe wrote, "For some time now I've wanted to write about the passion of old ladies."

== Production history ==
Pride's Crossing was first produced at the Old Globe Theatre in San Diego in January 1997. Directed by Jack O'Brien, it starred Cherry Jones as Mabel.

O'Brien and Jones reunited for the Off-Broadway Lincoln Center Theater production, which opened at the Mitzi E. Newhouse Theater on December 7, 1997 and closed on April 5, 1998 after 137 performances. The cast included Dylan Baker, Julia McIlvaine, David Lansbury, and Casey Biggs.

Ben Brantley of the New York Times said the play can "seem as garrulous and repetitive as a conversation-starved alumna at a 50-year college reunion. The affection that animates the play is evident . . . so is the dramatist's ear for the music in everyday conversation. But while Pride's Crossing is infused with Ms. Howe's lyrical sense of mortality and of the traps of sexual and social identity, this latest work from the author of Coastal Disturbances can also be like something its no-nonsense heroine might start to read and throw out as romantic hokum . . . Ms. Howe has said her works tend to alienate men because of her expressly feminine perspective. But the special flavor of her writing has more to do with a kind of whimsy that translates theatrical absurdism into costume-party cuteness."

The play was revived at the Off-Broadway T. Schreiber Studio from March 25 - April 18, 2004. Glenn Krutoff directed Tatjana Vujosevic as Mabel Tidings Bigelow.

== Overview ==
As the time goes backward and forward, Mabel Tidings Bigelow is seen in the present as a 90-year-old woman. She is then seen as a shy young woman from a rich and privileged Boston family, but who is most comfortable with the servants. Through her love of swimming, she finds strength and endurance. As she prepares to swim the English Channel her mother does not approve and her father is not present very often. In her old age, Mabel makes a connection with her young great-granddaughter, Minty Renoir.

== Awards and nominations ==
Tina Howe won the New York Drama Critics' Circle Award for Best American Play. The play was a finalist for the 1997 Pulitzer Prize for Drama (there was no winner for 1997). The pulitzer jury said: "a play that moves around the Twentieth Century with an elegance that is the hallmark of this... work."

Cherry Jones won the Drama Desk Award for Outstanding Actress in a Play, the Outer Critics Circle Award for Outstanding Actress in a Play, and the Lucille Lortel Award for Outstanding Actress. Kenneth Posner won the Lucille Lortel Award for Outstanding Lighting Design.

Howe was a finalist for the 1998 Susan Smith Blackburn Prize (which includes a cash award of $500).
