= Lighting design =

Design of lighting systems to meet objectives

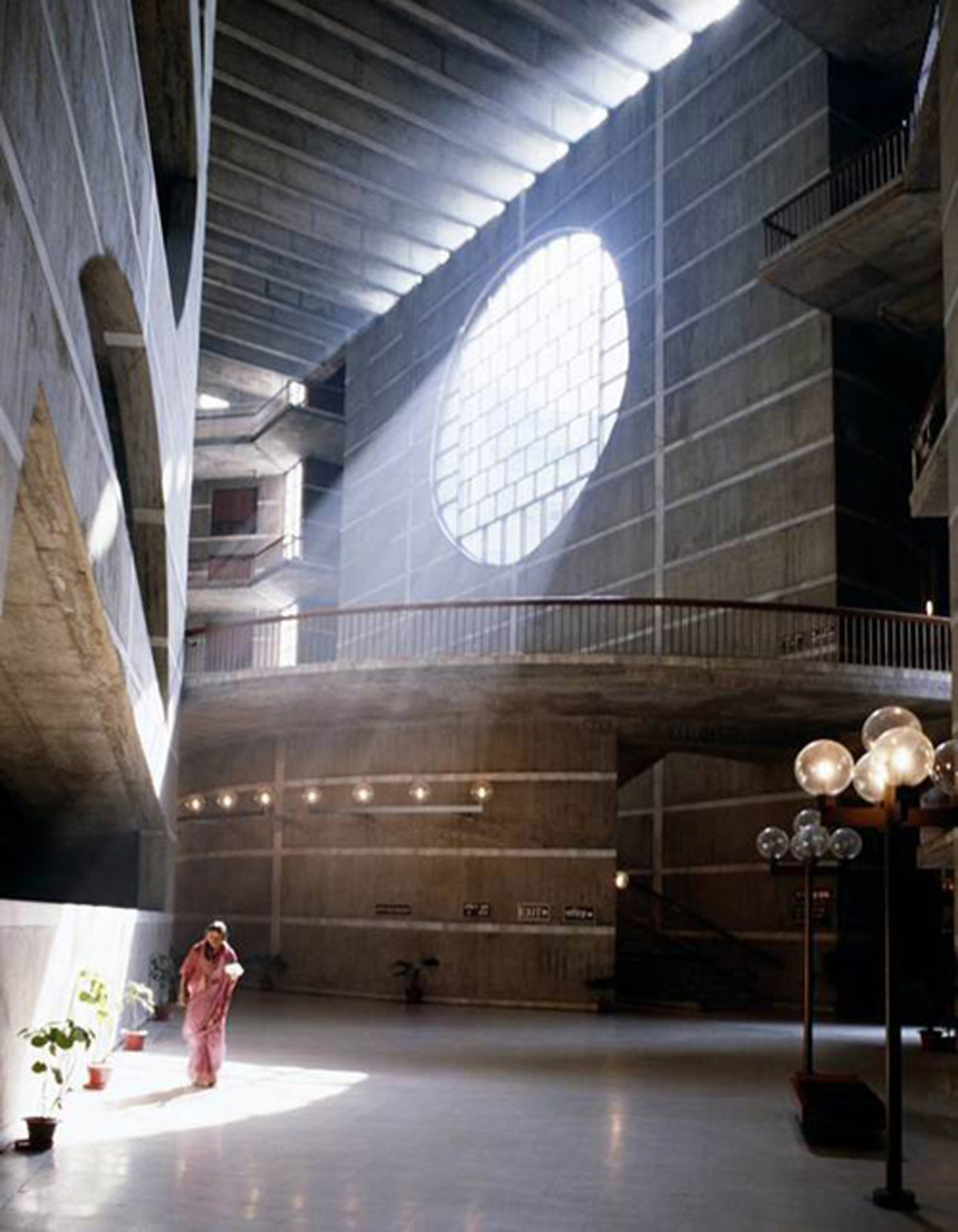
Dramatic daylighting inside Jatiyo Sangshad Bhaban, Dhaka.

Lighting design is essentially the careful design of lighting systems to meet specific objectives and requirements. Lighting systems can include electric lighting, daylighting, or both, as well as any associated controls. Support for human vision, health, mood, and entertainment are common examples of lighting design objectives. Requirements can be quantitative (e.g., minimum illuminance) or qualitative (e.g., low discomfort glare).

There are two basic types of lighting design practitioners, albeit with some overlap between these disciplines: architectural lighting designers and stage lighting designers. This is illustrated in the respective scope of their professional societies. For example:

- The International Association of Lighting Designers (IALD) focuses on architectural lighting design. However, the IALD Education Trust includes theatrical lighting design students in its work.
- The Professional Lighting and Sound Association (PLASA) focuses on the event and entertainment industries, including theater. However, PLASA's LIT Lighting Design Awards competition has categories for both architectural lighting design and entertainment lighting design.

== Architectural lighting ==
Although the effects of architectural lighting are often dynamic (e.g., due to automated dimming or color changing), the installed lighting systems are generally fixed in place. Specialties within architectural lighting include different methods and applications of indoor (e.g., daylighting, healthcare lighting) and outdoor (e.g., landscape lighting, roadway lighting) illumination. Recent research has also used physics-based simulation to evaluate pedestrian visibility, glare, and illuminance distribution in roadway and intersection lighting. Architectural lighting increasingly incorporates integrated LED solutions within everyday fixtures to enhance both functionality and aesthetics in interior environments. Common applications include illuminated mirrors and backlit surfaces, which provide uniform task lighting while contributing to ambient design. Industry resources and retailers also document the growing adoption of LED-integrated mirror systems in residential and hospitality settings.

== Set, stage, and theatrical lighting ==
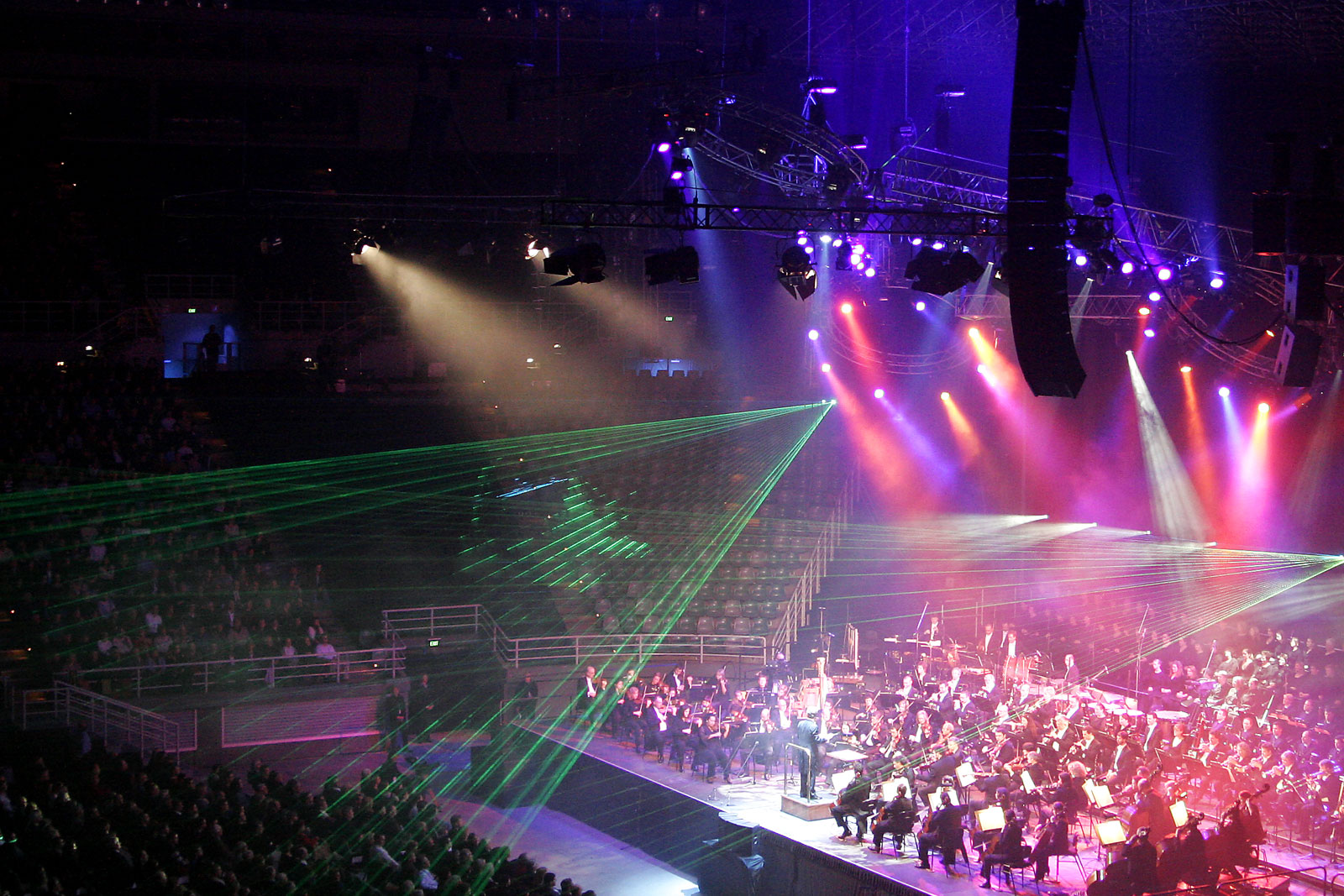
Lighting at the 2005 Classical Spectacular Concert.

Stage lighting design covers a wide array of events including stage plays and musicals, dance, opera, concerts, sporting events, and corporate launches.

In theatre, a lighting designer (or LD) works with the director, choreographer, set designer, costume designer, and sound designer to create the lighting, atmosphere, and time of day for the production in response to the text while keeping in mind issues of visibility, safety, and cost. The LD also works closely with the stage manager or show control programming, if show control systems are used in that production.

An LD of a pop tour may work directly the band and production manager, and at larger scales they may work with other creative directors and designers, while at smaller scales they may also be responsible for programming and light board operation. LDs work with master electricians to implement their designs.

In film, television, and video production, gaffers and lighting technicians work with the cinematographer or director of photography to light scenes for the camera.

== See also ==
- List of lighting designers
