= 2014 in basketball =

The following are the basketball events of the year 2014 throughout the world.

Tournaments include international (FIBA), professional (club) and amateur and collegiate levels.

== International tournaments ==
=== Men's tournaments ===
- FIBA Basketball World Cup in Spain:
  (gold) United States
  (silver) Serbia
  (bronze) France
- Asian Games in Incheon, South Korea:
  (gold) South Korea
  (silver) Iran
  (bronze) Japan
- Lusophony Games in Goa, India:
  (gold) India
  (silver) Angola
  (bronze) Mozambique
- South American Games in Santiago, Chile:
  (gold) Argentina
  (silver) Chile
  (bronze) Colombia

=== Women's tournaments ===
- FIBA World Championship for Women in Turkey:
  (gold) United States
  (silver) Spain
  (bronze) Australia
- 2014 FIBA 3x3 World Championships in Russia:
  (gold) United States
  (silver) Russia
  (bronze) Belgium
- Asian Games in Incheon, South Korea:
  (gold) South Korea
  (silver) China
  (bronze) Japan
- Lusophony Games in Goa, India:
  (gold) Mozambique
  (silver) Angola
  (bronze) India
- South American Games in Santiago, Chile:
  (gold) Argentina
  (silver) Chile
  (bronze) Colombia

=== Junior tournaments ===
==== Men's tournaments ====
- FIBA Under-17 World Championship: in Dubai, United Arab Emirates:
  (gold) United States
  (silver) Australia
  (bronze) Serbia

==== Women's tournaments ====
- FIBA Under-17 World Championship for Women: in Czech Republic:
  (gold) United States
  (silver) Spain
  (bronze) Hungary
- 2014 FIBA U18 3x3 Women in Spain:
  (gold) United States
  (silver) Spain
  (bronze) Australia

==== 2014 FIBA Europe youth championships ====
- 20 – 30 August: U-16 European Championship Men Division A in (Latvia) Ogre, Grobiņa, Liepāja and Riga
- 20 – 30 August: U-16 European Championship Men Division B in (North Macedonia) Strumica
- 30 June – 5 July: U-16 European Championship Men Division C in (Malta) Valletta
- 24 July – 3 August: U-18 European Championship Men Division A in (Turkey) Konya
- 24 July – 3 August: U-18 European Championship Men Division B in (Bulgaria) Sofia
- 22 – 27 July: U-18 European Championship Men Division C in Andorra la Vella
- 8 – 20 July: U-20 European Championship Men Division A in (Greece) Crete
- 10 – 20 July: U-20 European Championship Men Division B in (Bosnia and Herzegovina) Sarajevo
- 31 July – 10 August: U-16 European Championship Women Division A in (Hungary) Debrecen
- 31 July – 10 August: U-16 European Championship Women Division B in (Estonia) Tallinn
- 30 June – 5 July: U-16 European Championship Women Division C in (Malta) Valletta
- 17 – 27 July: U-18 European Championship Women Division A in (Portugal) Matosinhos
- 17 – 27 July: U-18 European Championship Women Division B in (Romania) Timișoara and Oradea
- 22 – 27 July: U-18 European Championship Women Division C in Andorra la Vella
- 3 – 13 July: U-20 European Championship Women Division A in (Italy) Udine
- 3 – 13 July: U-20 European Championship Women Division B in (Bulgaria) Sofia

== Drafts ==
- 2014 NBA draft
  - First pick in the NBA draft: Andrew Wiggins, University of Kansas, by the Cleveland Cavaliers
- 2014 WNBA draft
  - First pick in the WNBA draft: Chiney Ogwumike, Stanford University, by the Connecticut Sun

== Club championships ==
=== Continental championships ===
Men:

- Euroleague: (Israel) Maccabi Tel Aviv def. (Spain) Real Madrid 98–86 (OT)
  - Euroleague MVP: Sergio Rodríguez, Real Madrid
  - Euroleague Final Four MVP: Tyrese Rice, Maccabi Tel Aviv
  - Alphonso Ford Trophy (season's leading scorer): Keith Langford, (Italy) Emporio Armani Milano
- Eurocup: (Spain) Valencia def. (Russia) Unics Kazan 165–140 on aggregate
- EuroChallenge: (Italy) Grissin Bon Reggio Emilia def. (Russia) Triumph Lyubertsy 79–65
- Americas League: (Brazil) Flamengo def. (Brazil) Pinheiros 85–78
- Asia Champions Cup:

Women:

- EuroLeague Women:
  - (gold) (Turkey) Galatasaray Odeabank
  - (silver) (Turkey) Fenerbahçe
  - (bronze) (Russia) UMMC Ekaterinburg

=== Transnational championships ===
Men:

Region	Tournament	Champion	Runner-up	Result	Playoff format
Former Yugoslavia	2013–14 ABA League	(Croatia) KK Cibona	(Croatia) KK Cedevita	72–59	One-game playoff
Baltic states	2013–14 Baltic Basketball League	(Lithuania) BC Šiauliai	(Lithuania) TonyBet	140–123	Two-legged aggregate
Balkans	2013–14 BIBL season	(Hungary) Levski Sofia	(Israel) Hapoel Gilboa Galil	75–69	One-game playoff
North America	2013–14 NBA season	(United States) San Antonio Spurs	(United States) Miami Heat	4–1	Best-of-7 series
Australasia	2013–14 NBL season	(Australia) Perth Wildcats	(Australia) Adelaide 36ers	2–1	Best-of-3 series
Eastern Europe	2013–14 VTB United League	(Russia) CSKA Moscow	(Russia) BC Nizhny Novgorod	3–0	Best-of-5 series
South America	2014 Liga Sudamericana de Básquetbol	(Brazil) Bauru	(Brazil) Mogi das Cruzes	79–53	One-game playoff
Southeast Asia	2014 ABL season	(Thailand) Hi-Tech Bangkok City	Westports Malaysia Dragons	2–0	Best-of-3 series

=== National championships ===
- (Argentina) Liga Nacional de Básquet, 2013–14:
  - Regular season:
  - Playoffs:
- (Austria) Austrian Bundesliga, 2013–14: UBC magnofit Güssing Knights def. ece Bulls Kapfenberg 3–2
- (Belarus) Belarusian Premier League: BC Tsmoki-Minsk def. BK Grodno-93 3–1
- Basketball League Belgium, 2013–14: Telenet BC Oostende def. Okapi Aalstar 3–2
- Bosnia and Herzegovina Championship:
- (Brazil) Novo Basquete Brasil, 2013–14: Flamengo def. Paulistano 78–73
- (Bulgaria) Bulgarian National League: Levski Sofia def. Lukoil Academic 3–2
- National Basketball League of Canada, 2013–14: Windsor Express def. Island Storm 4–3
- (China) Chinese Basketball Association:
  - Regular season: Guangdong Southern Tigers
  - Playoffs: Beijing Ducks def. Xinjiang Flying Tigers 4–2
- (Croatia) Croatian League, 2013–14: Cedevita def. Cibona 3–0
- (Dominican Republic) Liga Nacional de Baloncesto, 2014: Metros de Santiago def Titanes del Distrito Nacional 4–2
- (Netherlands) Dutch Basketball League, 2013–14: GasTerra Flames def. SPM Shoeters Den Bosch 4–3
- (France) French Pro A League, 2013–14: Limoges def. Strasbourg 3–0
- (Estonia) Estonian League, 2013–14: Kalev/Cramo def. TÜ/Rock 4–0
- (Germany) German Bundesliga, 2013–14: FC Bayern Munich def. ALBA Berlin 3–1
- (Greece) Greek League, 2013–14: Panathinaikos def. Olympiacos 3–2
- NBL Indonesia, 2013–14: Aspac Jakarta def. Satria Muda 83–67
- (Iran) Iranian Super League, 2013–14: Petrochimi Bandar Imam def. Mahram Tehran 4–1
- (Israel) Israeli Super League, 2013–14: Maccabi Tel Aviv def. Maccabi Haifa 163−161 on aggregate
- (Italy) Italian Lega A, 2013–14: EA7 Emporio Armani Milano def. Montepaschi Siena 4−3, ending Montepaschi's streak of league titles at seven.
- (Latvia) Latvian League, 2013–14: BK Ventspils def. BK VEF Rīga 4–1
- (Lithuania) Lithuanian LKL, 2013–14: Žalgiris def. Neptūnas 4–2
- Montenegro League, 2013–14: Budućnost Podgorica def. Zeta 2011 3–2
- (Philippines) Philippine Basketball Association, 2013–14:
  - Philippine Cup: San Mig Super Coffee Mixers def. Rain or Shine Elasto Painters 4–2
  - Commissioner's Cup: San Mig Super Coffee Mixers def. Talk 'N Text Tropang Texters 3–1
  - Governors' Cup: San Mig Super Coffee Mixers def. Rain or Shine Elasto Painters 3–2
  - The Mixers became the first team to win the PBA's Grand Slam (winning all conferences in a season) since the Alaska Milkmen in 1996.
- (Poland) Polish League, 2013–14: Turów Zgorzelec def. Stelmet Zielona Góra 4–2
- (Portugal) Portuguese League: Benfica def. Vitória de Guimarães
- (Romania) Divizia A: CSU Asesoft Ploiești def. CSM Oradea 3–2
- League of Serbia, 2013–14: Partizan NIS def. Crvena Zvezda Telekom 3–1
- (Slovenia) Slovenian League: Krka def. Olimpija 3–2
- (Spain) Spanish ACB:
  - Season: Real Madrid
  - Playoffs: FC Barcelona def. Real Madrid 3–1
- Super Basketball League: Pure-Youth Construction def. Taiwan Mobile Clouded Leopards 4–1
- (Turkey) Turkish League, 2013–14: Fenerbahçe Ülker def. Galatasaray Liv Hospital 4–3
- (Ukraine) Ukrainian SuperLeague, 2013–14: Khimik def. Budivelnyk 3–1
- (United Kingdom) British Basketball League, 2013–14: Worcester Wolves
  - Season:Newcastle Eagles
  - Playoffs: Worcester Wolves def. Newcastle Eagles 90–78

Women:

- (United States) WNBA
  - Season:
    - Eastern Conference: Chicago Sky (best regular-season record: Atlanta Dream)
    - Western Conference: Phoenix Mercury (also best regular-season record overall)
  - Finals: The Mercury sweep the Sky 3–0 in the best-of-5 series, claiming their third title. Diana Taurasi of the Mercury is named Finals MVP.

=== College ===
Men

- (United States) NCAA
  - Division I: Connecticut Huskies def. Kentucky Wildcats 60–54
    - Most Outstanding Player: Shabazz Napier, Connecticut
  - National Invitation Tournament: Minnesota Golden Gophers def. SMU Mustangs 65–63
  - College Basketball Invitational: Siena Saints def. Fresno State Bulldogs 2–1 in best-of-3 final series
  - CollegeInsider.com Tournament: Murray State Racers def. Yale Bulldogs 65–57
  - Division II: Central Missouri Mules def. West Liberty Hilltoppers 84–77
  - Division III: Wisconsin–Whitewater Warhawks def. Williams Ephs 75–73
- (United States) NAIA
  - NAIA Division I: Vanguard def. Emmanuel 70–65
  - NAIA Division II: Indiana Wesleyan def Midland University 78–68
- (United States) NJCAA
  - Division I: Jones County def. Indian Hills 87–77
  - Division II: Phoenix def. Essex County 71–67
  - Division III: Rock Valley def. Caldwell 79–69
- (Canada) CIS Men's: Carleton Ravens def. Ottawa Gee-Gees 79–67
- (Philippines) UAAP Men's: National University def. Far Eastern University 2–1 in best-of-3 final series. NU wins their first title since 1954.
- NCAA (Philippines) Seniors': San Beda College def. Arellano University 2–0 in best-of-3 final series
- (Philippines) National Championship: San Beda College def. De La Salle University 2–0 in best-of-3 final series

Women

- (United States) NCAA
  - Division I: : Connecticut Huskies def. Notre Dame Fighting Irish 79–58
    - Most Outstanding Player: Breanna Stewart, Connecticut
  - WNIT: Rutgers Scarlet Knights def. UTEP Lady Miners 56–54
  - Women's Basketball Invitational:
  - Division II: Bentley Falcons def. West Texas A&M Buffaloes 73–65
  - Division III: FDU–Florham Devils def.Whitman Missionaries 80–72
- (United States) NAIA
  - NAIA Division I:
  - NAIA Division II:
- (United States) NJCAA
  - Division I: Trinity Valley Community College 65, Hutchinson Community College 46
  - Division II: Mesa Community College 82, Highland Community College 72
  - Division III: Northland Community and Technical College 69, Rock Valley College 60
- (Philippines) UAAP Women's: National University def. Far Eastern University in two games. NU finished with a 16–0 perfect season.

=== Prep ===
- (United States) USA Today Boys Basketball Ranking #1:
- (United States) USA Today Girls Basketball Ranking #1:
- NCAA (Philippines) Juniors: San Beda College-Rizal def. Malayan Science High School 2–0 in best-of-3 final series
- (Philippines) UAAP Juniors:

== Notable events ==
- On February 1, David Stern retired after being the commissioner of the NBA for 30 years. Adam Silver became his successor.
- On May 7, FIBA lifted the suspension of the Lebanese Basketball Federation in place since mid-2013, thereby allowing the country to participate in international basketball competitions once again.
- On August 5, the NBA's San Antonio Spurs announced that Becky Hammon would be hired as an assistant coach immediately after her retirement as a player at the end of the 2014 WNBA season. Hammon became the first full-time female coach in any of the four major U.S. professional leagues.
- On August 15, Sim Bhullar, a 7'5"/2.26 m Canadian center out of New Mexico State, became the first player of Indian descent to sign a contract with an NBA team. Bhullar signed a non-guaranteed rookie deal with the Sacramento Kings, a franchise whose majority owner, Vivek Ranadivé, is India-born.
- On November 26, FIBA suspended the Japan Basketball Association over the JBA's failure to merge the bj League and the National Basketball League. FIBA forbids a country from having two primary basketball competitions.

== Awards and honors ==
=== Naismith Memorial Basketball Hall of Fame ===
- Class of 2014:
  - Players: Šarūnas Marčiulionis, Alonzo Mourning, Mitch Richmond, Guy Rodgers
  - Coaches: Bobby "Slick" Leonard, Nolan Richardson, Gary Williams
  - Contributors: Nathaniel "Sweetwater" Clifton, David Stern
  - Team: Immaculata College (1972–1974 women's team)

=== Women's Basketball Hall of Fame ===
- Class of 2014
  - Lin Dunn
  - Michelle Edwards
  - Mimi Griffin
  - Yolanda Griffith
  - Jasmina Perazic
  - Charlotte West

=== Professional ===
==== North America ====
- Men (NBA)
  - Bill Russell NBA Finals Most Valuable Player Award: Kawhi Leonard, San Antonio Spurs
  - NBA All-Star Game MVP: Kyrie Irving, Cleveland Cavaliers
  - NBA Most Valuable Player Award: Kevin Durant, Oklahoma City Thunder
  - NBA Rookie of the Year Award: Michael Carter-Williams, Philadelphia 76ers
  - NBA Defensive Player of the Year Award: Joakim Noah, Chicago Bulls
  - NBA Sixth Man of the Year Award: Jamal Crawford, Los Angeles Clippers
  - NBA Most Improved Player Award: Goran Dragić, Phoenix Suns
  - NBA Sportsmanship Award: Mike Conley Jr., Memphis Grizzlies
  - NBA Coach of the Year Award: Gregg Popovich, San Antonio Spurs
  - J. Walter Kennedy Citizenship Award: Luol Deng, Cleveland Cavaliers
  - Twyman–Stokes Teammate of the Year Award: Shane Battier, Miami Heat
  - NBA Executive of the Year Award: R. C. Buford, San Antonio Spurs
- Women (WNBA)
  - WNBA Most Valuable Player Award: Maya Moore, Minnesota Lynx
  - WNBA Defensive Player of the Year Award: Brittney Griner, Phoenix Mercury
  - WNBA Rookie of the Year Award: Chiney Ogwumike, Connecticut Sun
  - WNBA Sixth Woman of the Year Award: Allie Quigley, Chicago Sky
  - WNBA Most Improved Player Award: Skylar Diggins, Tulsa Shock
  - Kim Perrot Sportsmanship Award: Becky Hammon, San Antonio Stars
  - WNBA Coach of the Year Award: Sandy Brondello, Phoenix Mercury
  - WNBA All-Star Game MVP: Shoni Schimmel, Atlanta Dream
  - WNBA Finals Most Valuable Player Award: Diana Taurasi, Phoenix Mercury

==== Europe ====
- Men
  - FIBA Europe Player of the Year Award: Tony Parker, France and (United States) San Antonio Spurs
  - Euroscar Award:
  - Mr. Europa:
- Women:
  - FIBA Europe Player of the Year Award:

=== Collegiate ===
- Combined
  - Legends of Coaching Award: Bill Self, Kansas
- Men
  - Associated Press College Basketball Coach of the Year: Gregg Marshall, Wichita State
  - Associated Press College Basketball Player of the Year: Doug McDermott, Creighton
  - Frances Pomeroy Naismith Award: Russ Smith, Louisville
  - John R. Wooden Award: Doug McDermott, Creighton
  - Naismith College Coach of the Year: Gregg Marshall, Wichita State
  - USBWA National Freshman of the Year: Jabari Parker, Duke
- Women
  - Associated Press College Basketball Coach of the Year: Muffet McGraw, Notre Dame
  - Associated Press Women's College Basketball Player of the Year: Breanna Stewart, Connecticut
  - Carol Eckman Award: Jane Albright, UNLV
  - Frances Pomeroy Naismith Award: Odyssey Sims, Baylor
  - John R. Wooden Award: Chiney Ogwumike, Stanford
  - Kay Yow Award: Kristy Curry, Alabama
  - Senior CLASS Award: Stefanie Dolson, Connecticut
  - Basketball Academic All-America Team: Chiney Ogwumike, Stanford
  - Maggie Dixon Award: Billi Godsey, Iona
  - Naismith College Coach of the Year: Muffet McGraw, Notre Dame
  - Naismith College Player of the Year: Breanna Stewart, Connecticut
  - Nancy Lieberman Award: Odyssey Sims, Baylor
  - NCAA basketball tournament Most Outstanding Player: Breanna Stewart, Connecticut
  - USBWA National Freshman of the Year: Diamond DeShields, North Carolina
  - Wade Trophy: Odyssey Sims, Baylor

== Deaths ==
- January 11 — Dick Miller, American NBA player (Indiana Pacers, Utah Jazz) (born 1958)
- January 13 — Don Asmonga, NBA player (Baltimore Bullets) (born 1928)
- January 13 — Bennie Lands, Canadian Olympic player (1948) (born 1921)
- January 21 — Dick Shrider, American NBA player (New York Knicks) and college coach (Miami Redskins) (born 1923)
- January 23 — Lew Massey, American college (Charlotte 49ers) and PBA player (born 1956)
- January 25 — Dave Strack, American college coach (Michigan Wolverines) (born 1923)
- January 26 — Tom Gola, American Naismith Hall of Fame player (born 1933)
- January 29 — Vytautas Norkus, Lithuanian-born American player, EuroBasket winner (1939) (born 1921)
- February 7 — Murray Mendenhall Jr., American NBL player (Anderson Packers) and high school coach (born 1925)
- February 8 — Keith Hughes, American college (Rutgers Scarlet Knights) and professional player (born 1968)
- February 10 — Betty Jaynes, American Women's Basketball Hall of Fame member and college coach (James Madison Dukes) (born 1945)
- February 15 — Jim Lacy, American college player (Loyola Greyhounds), NCAA leading scorer in 1947 (born 1926)
- February 16 — Charlie Kraak, American college player, NCAA champion at Indiana (1953) (born 1932)
- February 16 — Rich Peek, American ABA player (Dallas Chaparrals) (born 1944)
- February 18 — Cob Jarvis, American college coach (Ole Miss Rebels) (born 1932)
- February 21 — Eddie O'Brien, American college player (Seattle Chieftains) (born 1930)
- February 23 — Ely Capacio, Filipino player, coach and PBA executive (born 1955)
- February 27 — Terry Rand, American college player (Marquette Warriors) (born 1934)
- March 10 — Rob Williams, American NBA player (Denver Nuggets) (born 1961)
- March 12 — Wil Jones, American college coach (District of Columbia, Norfolk State) (born 1938)
- March 14 — Sam Lacey, American NBA player (Cincinnati Royals) (born 1948)
- March 21 — Jim Brasco, American NBA player (Syracuse Nationals, Milwaukee Hawks) (born 1931)
- March 23 — Bobby Croft, Canadian ABA player (Texas Chaparrals, Kentucky Colonels) (born 1946)
- April 7 — Royce Waltman, American college coach (Indiana State Sycamores) (born 1942)
- April 11 — Zander Hollander, American sportswriter (Pro Basketball Handbooks) (born 1923)
- April 11 — Lou Hudson, American NBA player (Atlanta Hawks, Los Angeles Lakers) (born 1944)
- April 14 — Joe Curl, American women's basketball coach (Houston Cougars) (born 1954)
- April 21 — Weldon Kern, American college player, two-time NCAA champion at Oklahoma A&M (1945, 1946) (born 1923)
- April 21 — Bill Klucas, American college (Milwaukee Panthers) and professional coach (born 1941)
- April 27 — Marlbert Pradd, American ABA player (New Orleans Buccaneers) (born 1944)
- April 27 — Turhan Tezol, Turkish Olympic player (1952) (born 1932)
- April 28 — Jack Ramsay, American Naismith Hall of Fame coach (born 1925)
- May 6 — Billy Harrell, American college player (Siena Saints) (born 1928)
- May 8 — Harry Weltman, American ABA (Spirits of St. Louis) and NBA (Cleveland Cavaliers, New Jersey Nets) executive (born 1933)
- May 18 — Don Meyer, American college basketball coach (Northern State, Hamline, Lipscomb) (born 1944)
- May 28 — Bob Houbregs, Canadian Hall of Fame player (born 1932)
- May 31 — Lewis Katz, American NBA team owner (New Jersey Nets) (born 1942)
- June 7 — E. W. Foy, American college coach (Southeastern Louisiana, McNeese State) (born 1937)
- June 26 — Lidia Alexeyeva, Russian Naismith Hall of Fame women's basketball coach (born 1924)
- June 30 — Ed Messbarger, American college coach (Saint Mary's (Texas), Angelo State) (born 1932)
- July 5 — Robert Jeangerard, American Olympic gold medalist (1956) (born 1933)
- July 11 — Bill McGill, American NBA and ABA player (born 1939)
- July 12 — Red Klotz, NBA player and Washington Generals founder (born 1921)
- July 24 — Dale Schlueter, NBA player (born 1945)
- July 27 — Wallace Jones, NBA player (Indianapolis Olympians) and Olympic Gold Medalist (1948) (born 1926)
- August 14 — John Cinicola, American college coach (Duquesne) (born 1929)
- August 19 — George Munroe, American NBA player (St. Louis Bombers, Boston Celtics) (born 1922)
- August 25 —Bob Warren, American ABA player (born 1946)
- August 26 — Bob Wilson, American NBA player (Milwaukee Hawks) (born 1926)
- August 28 — Jack Kraft, American college coach (Villanova, Rhode Island) (born 1922)
- August 29 —Kurt Bachmann, Filipino Olympic player (1960) (born 1936)
- September 1 — Dillard Crocker, American BAA and NBA player (born 1925)
- September 1 — Jim Jennings, American college player (Murray State Racers) (born 1941)
- September 4 — Martynas Andriukaitis, Lithuanian player (born 1981)
- September 7 — Jack Cristil, American radio announcer (Mississippi State Bulldogs) (born 1925)
- September 7 —Maryna Doroshenko, Ukrainian women's national team member (born 1981)
- September 8 — Marvin Barnes, American NBA and ABA player but is best known for collegiate career at Providence (born 1952)
- September 12 — Lonnie Lynn, American ABA player (Pittsburgh Pipers) (born 1943)
- September 13 — Paul Valenti, American college coach (Oregon State Beavers) (born 1920)
- September 19 — Bill Detrick, American college coach (Central Connecticut Blue Devils) (born 1927)
- September 21 — Caldwell Jones, American ABA, NBA player (born 1950)
- September 21 — Ed Koffenberger, American college All-American (Duke Blue Devils) (born 1926)
- September 22 — Jason Rabedeaux, American college (UTEP Miners) and professional coach (born 1965)
- September 23 — A. W. Davis, American college player (Tennessee Volunteers) (born 1943)
- September 23 — Robin Freeman, American college player (Ohio State Buckeyes) (born 1934)
- September 28 — Roy Ebron, American ABA player (Utah Stars) (born 1951)
- October 1 — Charlie Paulk, American NBA player (born 1946)
- October 6 — Bill Campbell, American sportscaster (Philadelphia Warriors, Philadelphia 76ers) (born 1923)
- October 10 — Lari Ketner, American NBA player (born 1977)
- October 11 — Tanhum Cohen-Mintz, Israeli basketball player (Maccabi Tel Aviv) (born 1939)
- October 16 — Seppo Kuusela, Finnish player (born 1934)
- October 27 — Bob Kenney, American NCAA (Kansas 1952) and Olympic (1952) champion (born 1931)
- October 27 — Dan Peters, American college coach (Youngstown State) (born 1954)
- October 28 — Jim Paxson, Sr., American NBA player (Minneapolis Lakers, Cincinnati Royals) (born 1932)
- November 2 — Jesse Branson, American NBA (Philadelphia 76ers) and ABA (New Orleans Buccaneers) player. (born 1942)
- November 8 — Ernie Vandeweghe, American NBA player (New York Knicks) (born 1928)
- November 22 — Don Grate, American NBA player (Sheboygan Red Skins) (born 1923)
- November 23 — Bob Gottlieb, American college coach (Jacksonville, Milwaukee)
- November 26 — Don Dee, American ABA player (Indiana Pacers), Olympic champion (1968) (born 1943)
- December 1 — Aleksandar Petrović, Serbian coach (born 1959)
- December 2 — Josie Cichockyj, British wheelchair basketball player (born 1964)
- December 14 — Doug Martin, American college coach (South Dakota, Dakota Wesleyan) (born 1936)
- December 20 — George Fisher, American college coach (Austin Peay)
- December 21 — Frank Truitt, American college coach (LSU, Kent State) (born 1925)
- December 21 — Paul Walther, American NBA player (born 1927)
- December 22 — Nate Fox, American player (born 1977)
- December 24 — Robert Hall, Harlem Globetrotters player (born 1927)

== See also ==
- Timeline of women's basketball
