= Jamar Enzor =

American football player (born 1981)

No. 98
- Position: Linebacker

Personal information
- Born: December 28, 1981 (age 44); Tallahassee, Florida, U.S.
- Listed height: 6 ft 1 in (1.85 m)
- Listed weight: 238 lb (108 kg)

Career information
- High school: Havana Northside (Havana, Florida)
- College: Cincinnati
- NFL draft: 2005: undrafted

Career history
- Jacksonville Jaguars (2005)*; New York Jets (2005); Rhein Fire (2007); Baltimore Ravens (2007)*
- * Offseason or practice squad member only

Career NFL statistics
- Games played: 1
- Stats at Pro Football Reference

Jamar Rondell Enzor (born December 28, 1981) is an American former professional football player who was a linebacker for one season in the National Football League (NFL) with the New York Jets. He played college football for the Cincinnati Bearcats and was signed as an undrafted free agent in 2005 by the Jacksonville Jaguars. Enzor also spent time with the Rhein Fire and Baltimore Ravens.

== Early life and education ==
Enzor was born on December 28, 1981, in Tallahassee, Florida. He attended Havana Northside High School, where he competed in football and basketball before graduating in 2000. After graduating, he accepted a scholarship offer from the University of Cincinnati. He spent his first season there as a redshirt, but played on the varsity team in the following four seasons. In 2003, he led Cincinnati with 137 tackles and was named team MVP, as well as All-Conference. He graduated in 2005 with a degree in criminal justice.

== Professional career ==
After going unselected in the 2005 NFL draft, Enzor signed with the Jacksonville Jaguars as an undrafted free agent. He was waived on August 14.

Enzor was signed to the practice squad of the New York Jets on November 30. He was promoted to the active roster for their game against the Miami Dolphins, and made his NFL debut in the 20–24 loss. He was inactive for their final two games of the season. He was waived in August 2006.

Enzor played for the Rhein Fire of NFL Europa in 2007, appearing in six games. He made 30 tackles and returned two interceptions for a total of 72 yards, both scoring touchdowns. He also defended three passes and forced one fumble.

Enzor was signed by the Baltimore Ravens for the 2007 NFL season, but was released at the final roster cuts in September.
