= Mallory Horne =

American politician

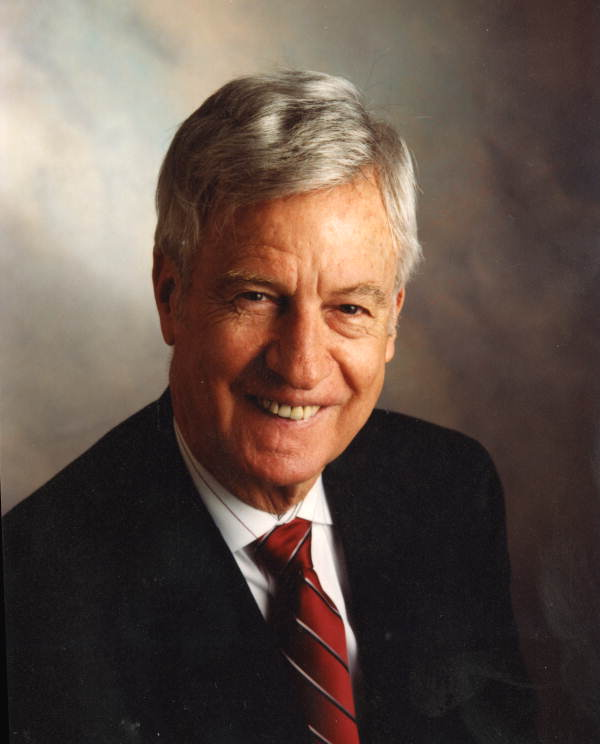

President of the Florida Senate
- In office November 21, 1972 – July 1, 1974
- Preceded by: Jerry Thomas
- Succeeded by: Dempsey Barron

Member of the Florida Senate
- In office March 28, 1967 – July 1, 1974
- Preceded by: George Tapper
- Succeeded by: Pat Thomas
- Constituency: 5th (1967–1972); 4th (1972–1974)

Speaker of the Florida House of Representatives
- In office 1962–1963
- Preceded by: Bill Chappell
- Succeeded by: E. C. Rowell

Personal details
- Born: April 17, 1925 Tavares, Florida
- Died: April 30, 2009 (aged 84) Tallahassee, Florida
- Party: Democratic
- Spouse(s): Anne Livingston, Mary Lou Reichert
- Profession: Lawyer

Military service
- Allegiance: United States
- Branch/service: United States Air Force
- Rank: Captain
- Battles/wars: World War II

Mallory E. Horne (April 17, 1925 – April 30, 2009) was the speaker of the Florida House of Representatives, and president of the Florida Senate, becoming the third person in state history to hold both positions, after Ion Farris and Philip Dell.

== Background ==
Horne was a United States Army Air Forces pilot during World War II. After the war, Mallory continued to serve in the United States Air Force and Air Force Reserve, being later honorably discharged at the rank of captain. He attended the University of Florida, and served as the chancellor of the Student Government Honor Court in 1949.

Becoming a lawyer, Horne opened his own practice in Tallahassee, Florida, and was elected as statewide president of the Junior Bar of Florida (for lawyers under the age of 36).

== Political career ==
Horne served in the Florida State Legislature, rising to the positions of speaker of the Florida House of Representatives and president of the Florida State Senate.

Horne was the second post-Reconstruction person to serve as both speaker of the House and president of the Senate, after Ion Farris. He was credited as "chiefly responsible for keeping the state capital in Tallahassee against an effort to move it [south] to Orlando".

Horne left the legislature after an unsuccessful run for the Democratic U.S. Senate nomination in 1974, working as a lawyer and a lobbyist.

== Scandal ==
Horne was tried and acquitted in 1985 on charges of money laundering when federal investigators alleged that he had smuggled marijuana into the United States from the Cayman Island on the twin-engined airplane he piloted.

== Family ==
Mallory married Anne Livingston in 1944. They later had two sons, Mallory, Jr. and David. After divorce, he later married Mary Lou Reichert.

== Death ==
Mallory Horne died from lung cancer, aged 84, on April 30, 2009. He was survived by his wife, his son Mallory, Jr., and a stepson, Don. He was predeceased by his son, David Horne.
