= Florida's 25th Senate district =

American legislative district

Florida's 25th State Senate district
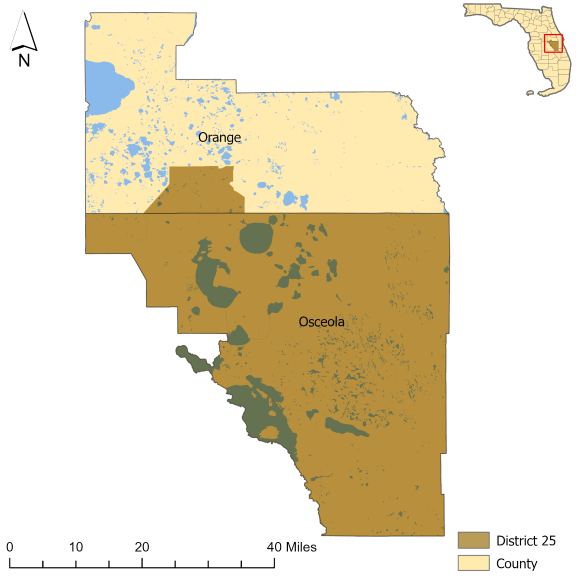
Senator
Kristen Arrington; D–Kissimmee
- Demographics: 27% White; 10% Black; 55% Hispanic; 4% Asian; 1% Other; 3% Multiracial
- Population (2023): 538,601

Florida's 25th Senate district elects one member of the Florida Senate. The district consists of all of Osceola County and part of southern Orange County, in the U.S. state of Florida. The current senator is Democrat Kristen Arrington.

Three presidents of the Florida Senate have represented the district: Dempsey Barron, Jeff Atwater, and Joe Negron.

The district contains many popular Orlando attractions like SeaWorld Orlando, Icon Park, Discovery Cove, Aquatica, Gatorland, Old Town, Fun Spot, and some of Walt Disney World.

== List of senators ==
Full list of senators from the 25th district (1845–2006).

Portrait	Name	Party	Years of service	Home city/state	Notes
	George Tapper	Democratic	1953–1956	Port St. Joe, Florida	Consisted of Gulf County
	Bart Knight	Democratic	1957–1959	Blountstown, Florida	Redistricted; Consisted of Calhoun County
	Dempsey Barron	Democratic	1960–1966	Andalusia, Alabama	Redistricted; Consisted of Bay County
	T. Truett Ott	Democratic	1966–1972	Osyka, Mississippi	
	Warren Henderson	Republican	1972–1984	Exeter, New Hampshire	Redistricted; Consisted of part of Sarasota County
	Bob Johnson	Republican	1984–1992	Sarasota, Florida	Consisted of part of Sarasota County
	Fred Dudley	Republican	1992–1998	Fort Myers, Florida	Redistricted from the 38th district; Consisted of Lee and Collier counties
	Burt Saunders	Republican	1998–2002	Hampton, Virginia	Consisted of Collier and Lee counties
	Jeff Atwater	Republican	2002–2010	St. Louis, Missouri	Redistricted; Consisted of Palm Beach and Broward counties
	Ellyn Setnor Bogdanoff	Republican	2010–2012	North Miami, Florida	Consisted of parts of Palm Beach and Broward counties
	Joseph Abruzzo	Democratic	2012–2016	Brooksville, Florida	Redistricted; Consisted of most of Palm Beach County
	Joe Negron	Republican	2016–2018	West Palm Beach, Florida	Redistricted from the 32nd district; Consisted of all of St. Lucie and Martin counties and the northwestern part of Palm Beach County
	Gayle Harrell	Republican	2018–2022	Nashville, Tennessee	Consisted of all of St. Lucie and Martin counties and the northwestern part of Palm Beach County
	Vic Torres	Democratic	2022–2024	New York City, New York	Redistricted from the 15th district; Consisted all of Osceola County and part of southern Orange County
	Kristen Arrington	Democratic	2024–present	Holiday, Florida	Consists all of Osceola County and part of southern Orange County

== Elections ==
=== 2020 ===
2020 Florida's 25th senate district election
Party	Candidate	Votes	%
Republican	Gayle Harrell	168,063	58.7
Democratic	Corinna Robinson	118,211	41.3
Total votes		286,274	100.0
Republican hold			

=== 2022 ===
2022 Florida's 25th senate district election
Party	Candidate	Votes	%
Democratic	Vic Torres (incumbent)	70,120	52.56
Republican	Peter Vivaldi	63,288	47.44
Total votes		133,408	100%
Democratic hold			

=== 2024 ===
2024 Florida's 25th senate district election
Party	Candidate	Votes	%
Democratic	Kristen Arrington	113,095	51.48
Republican	Jose Martinez	106,596	48.52
Total votes		219,691	100.00
Democratic hold			
