= Senator Henderson =

Senator Henderson may refer to:

== Members of the Australian Senate ==
- George Henderson (Australian politician) (1857–1933), Australian Senator from Western Australia from 1904 to 1923
- Sarah Henderson (born 1964), Australian Senator from Victoria since 2019

== Members of the United States Senate ==
- Charles Henderson (Nevada politician) (1873–1954), U.S. Senator from Nevada from 1918 to 1921
- James Pinckney Henderson (1808–1858), U.S. Senator from Texas from 1857 to 1858
- John B. Henderson (1826–1913), U.S. Senator from Missouri from 1862 to 1869
- John Henderson (Mississippi politician) (1797–1857), U.S. Senator from Mississippi from 1839 to 1845

== United States state senate members ==
- Deidre Henderson (born 1974), Utah State Senate
- Frank Henderson (South Dakota politician) (1928–2012), South Dakota State Senate
- James Henderson Jr. (1942–2022), Arizona State Senate
- John M. Henderson (1868–1947), Texas State Senate
- John S. Henderson (1846–1916), North Carolina State Senate
- Mike Henderson (politician) (born 1958/59), Missouri State Senate
- Monroe Henderson (1818–1899), New York State Senate
- Richard Henderson (Hawaii politician) (1928–2026), Hawaii State Senate
- Thomas Henderson (New Jersey politician) (1743–1824), New Jersey State Senate
- Thomas J. Henderson (politician) (1824–1911), Illinois State Senate
- Warren Henderson (1927–2011), Florida State Senate
