= Donald Heath =

Donald or Don Heath may refer to:

- Donald Heath (politician) (1928–2011), American politician from Florida
- Donald R. Heath (1894–1981), American diplomat
- Don Heath (born 1944), English footballer
