= Senator Bruner =

Senator Bruner may refer to:

- Charles Hughes Bruner (born 1948), Iowa State Senate
- Elwood Bruner (1854–1915), Alaska Territorial Senate
- Vince Bruner (born 1957), Florida State Senate
