= Planter's Exchange, Inc. =

- The Planters Exchange, Inc.
- U.S. National Register of Historic Places
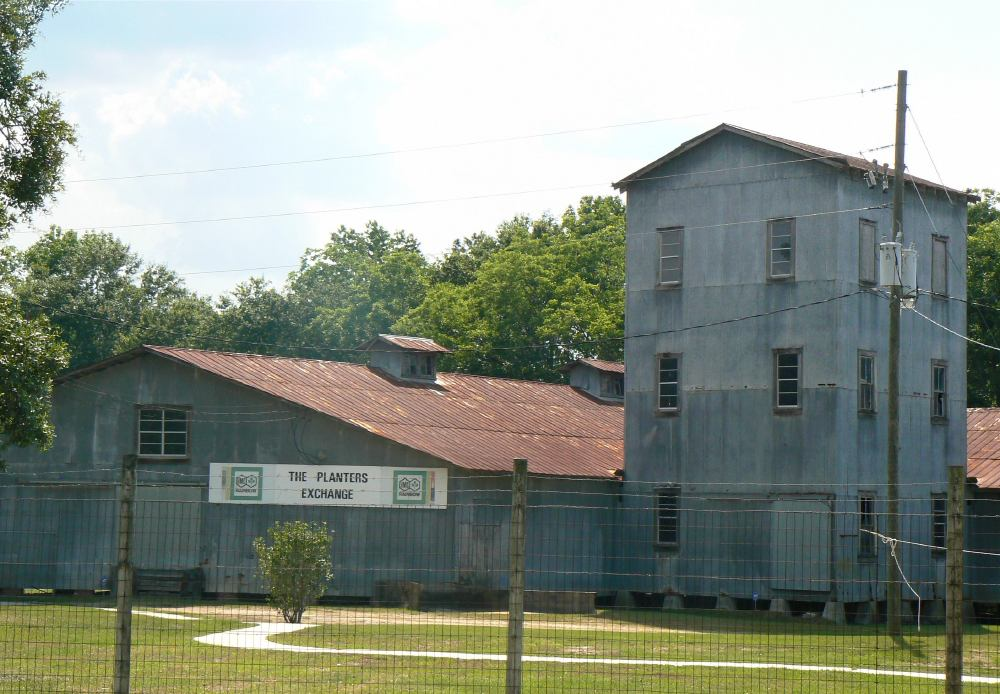

- Location within Florida Location within the United States
- Location: 204 Second St., NW, Havana, Florida
- Coordinates: 30°37′28″N 84°25′2″W
- Area: 2.5 acres (1.0 ha)
- NRHP reference No.: 99001147
- Added to NRHP: September 17, 1999

The Planter's Exchange, Inc. is a historic site in Havana, Florida. It is located at 204 2nd Street, Northwest, and was originally a tobacco warehouse. On September 17, 1999, it was added to the U.S. National Register of Historic Places.

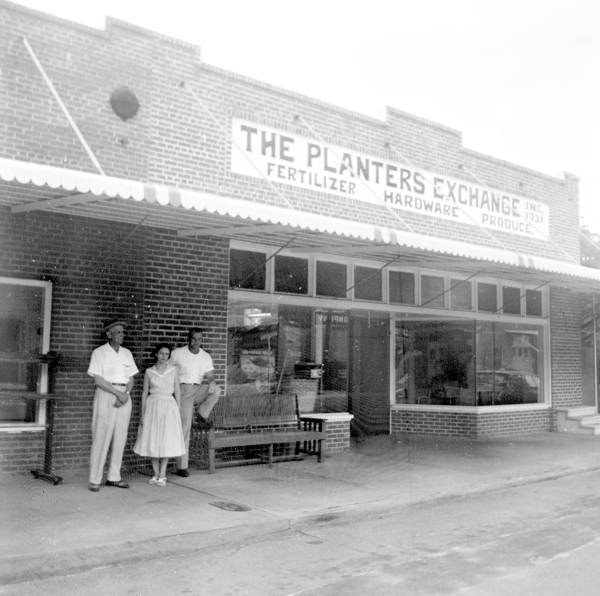
The Exchange in 1959.
