= Bob Johnson (Florida politician) =

American politician (1934–2015)

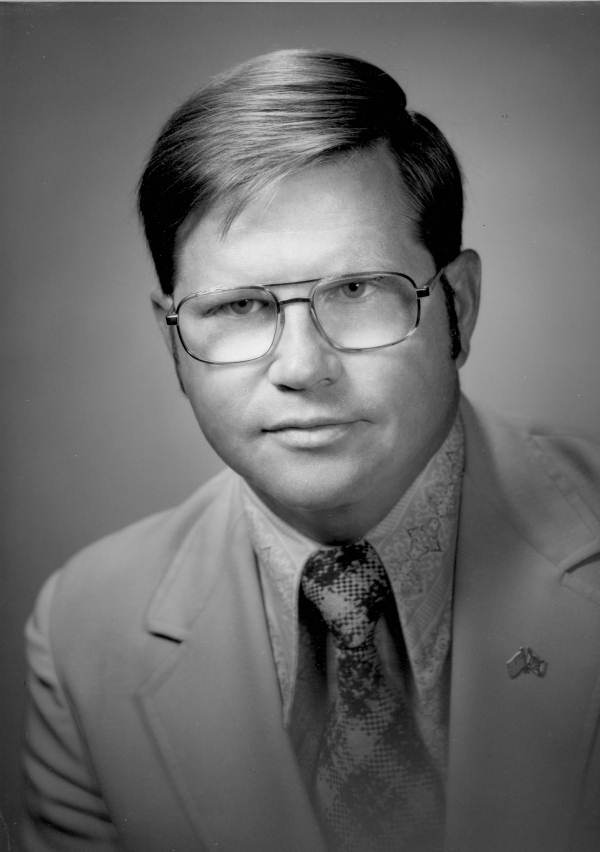

Member of the Florida Senate from the 25th district
- In office November 6, 1984 – November 3, 1992
- Preceded by: Warren Henderson
- Succeeded by: Jim Boczar (redistricting)

Member of the Florida House of Representatives from the 70th district
- In office November 2, 1982 – November 6, 1984
- Preceded by: Helen Gordon Davis (redistricting)
- Succeeded by: Jim Lombard

Member of the Florida House of Representatives
- In office November 3, 1970 – November 2, 1976
- Preceded by: Donald Heath
- Succeeded by: Ted Ewing
- Constituency: 118th district (1970–1972); 74th district (1972–1976)

Personal details
- Born: September 1, 1934 Akron, Ohio, U.S.
- Died: August 31, 2015 (aged 80) Sarasota, Florida, U.S.
- Party: Republican
- Spouse: Patricia Ann Edenfield
- Children: 4
- Education: Florida State University (B.S.); University of Florida College of Law (J.D.)
- Occupation: Attorney

Robert M. Johnson (September 1, 1934 – August 31, 2015) was an American politician in the state of Florida. A member of the Republican Party, he served as a member of the Florida House of Representatives from 1970 to 1976 and again from 1982 to 1984, and as a member of the Florida Senate from the 25th district from 1984 to 1992.

In 1970, Johnson was elected for the 118th district of the Florida House of Representatives. He succeeded Donald Heath. In 1972, Johnson was succeeded as representative for the 118th district by Dick Clark. In the same year, he was elected for the 74th district for which Johnson had succeeded William E. Powell. He was succeeded by Ted Ewing in 1976.

Johnson died on August 31, 2015, at the age of 80.
