= Fred Dudley =

American politician (1944–2026)

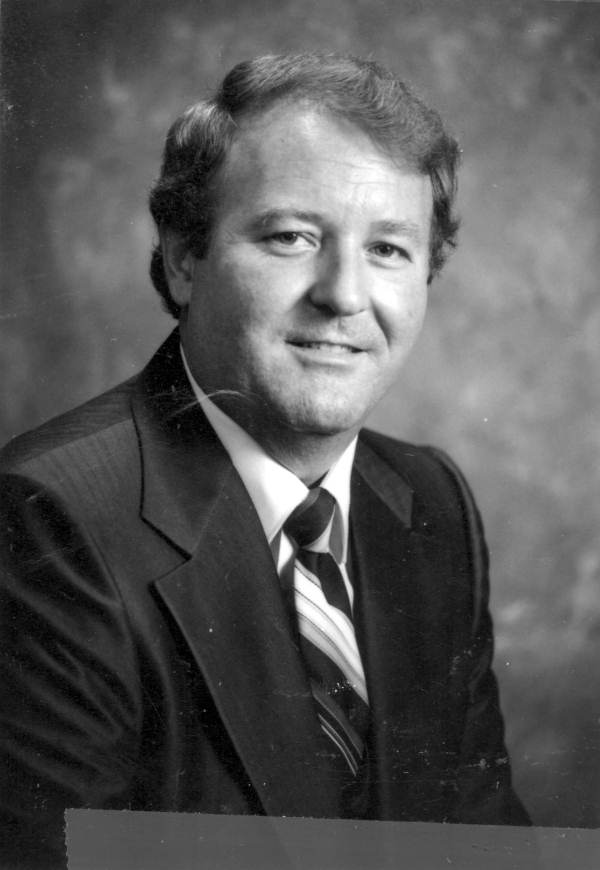
- Dudley in 1982

Member of the Florida Senate
- In office November 4, 1986 – November 3, 1998
- Preceded by: Robert W. McKnight
- Succeeded by: Burt Saunders
- Constituency: 38th district (1986–1992); 25th district (1992–1998)

Member of the Florida House of Representatives
- In office November 2, 1982 – November 4, 1986
- Preceded by: Ted Ewing

Personal details
- Born: November 8, 1944 Fort Myers, Florida, U.S.
- Died: July 13, 2026 (aged 81) Havana, Florida, U.S.
- Party: Republican
- Education: University of South Florida
- Occupation: Attorney

Frederick R. Dudley (November 8, 1944 – July 13, 2026) was an American politician in the state of Florida.

== Life and career ==
Frederick R. Dudley was born in Fort Myers and was an attorney. He served in the Florida House of Representatives for the 74th district from 1982 to 1986, as a Republican. He served in the Florida Senate from 1986 until 1998. In 1998, he ran for Florida Attorney General. He became a Florida Bar Certified Construction Lawyer in 2005, and practiced law in Tallahassee, specializing in representing applicants for contractor licenses and in disciplinary proceedings.

Dudley died on July 13, 2026, at the age of 81.
