= William E. Powell =

American politician

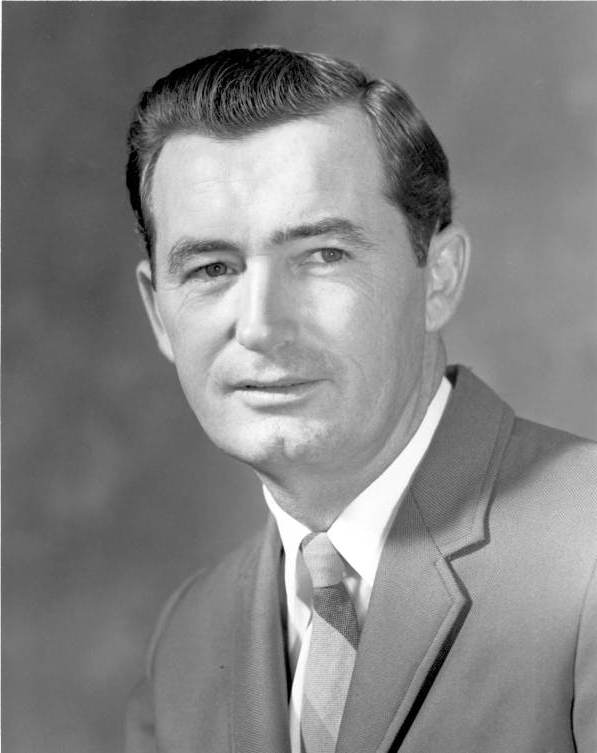

Member of the Florida House of Representatives from the 74th district
- In office 1967–1972
- Preceded by: District established
- Succeeded by: Robert M. Johnson

Personal details
- Born: February 5, 1934 (age 92) Troy, New York, U.S.
- Party: Republican
- Education: Siena College
- Occupation: Attorney, land surveyor

William E. Powell (born February 5, 1934) is an American attorney and former politician in the state of Florida.

Powell was born in Troy, New York, and attended Siena College. He worked as a land surveyor and later became an attorney. He served as a member of the Florida House of Representatives from 1967 to 1972, representing the 74th district. Powell is affiliated with the Republican Party.
