= Kent McKinley =

American politician (1898–1972)

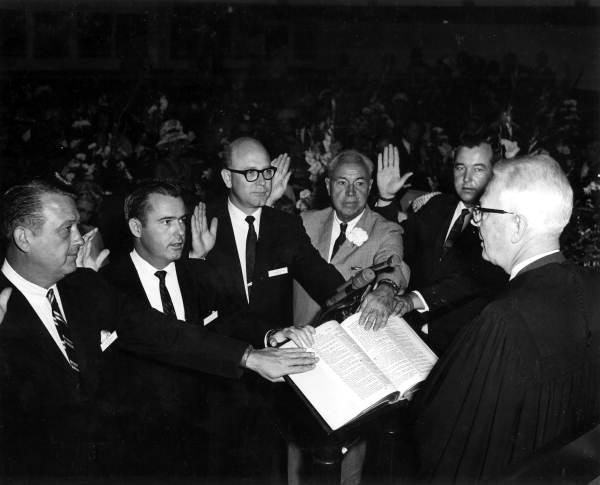
- McKinley with Granville Crabtree, Thomas Gallen, Jerome Pratt, B. Campbell Thornal and Jim K. Tillman in 1967

Member of the Florida House of Representatives from the 118th district
- In office March 1967 – November 1968
- Preceded by: District established
- Succeeded by: Donald Heath

Personal details
- Born: March 25, 1898 Adams, New York, U.S.
- Died: October 1972 (aged 74)
- Party: Republican
- Spouse: Marjorie Butler
- Education: Dartmouth College; Florida Southern College

Kent S. McKinley (March 25, 1898 – October 1972) was an American politician. He served as a Republican member for the 118th district of the Florida House of Representatives.

McKinley was born in Adams, New York, and attended Dartmouth College. At the age of 17 he was an actor, director and writer at a summer stock theater in Buffalo, New York. McKinley was director of the Buffalo, New York daily newspaper The Buffalo News. He was also the founder and editor of The Sarasota News.

In 1967, McKinley was elected as a member for the newly established 118th district of the Florida House of Representatives. He was succeeded by Donald Heath in 1968 after he decided not to seek re-election because of ill-health.

McKinley died in October 1972 of a heart attack at his summer home, at the age of 74.
