= Ted Ewing =

American politician

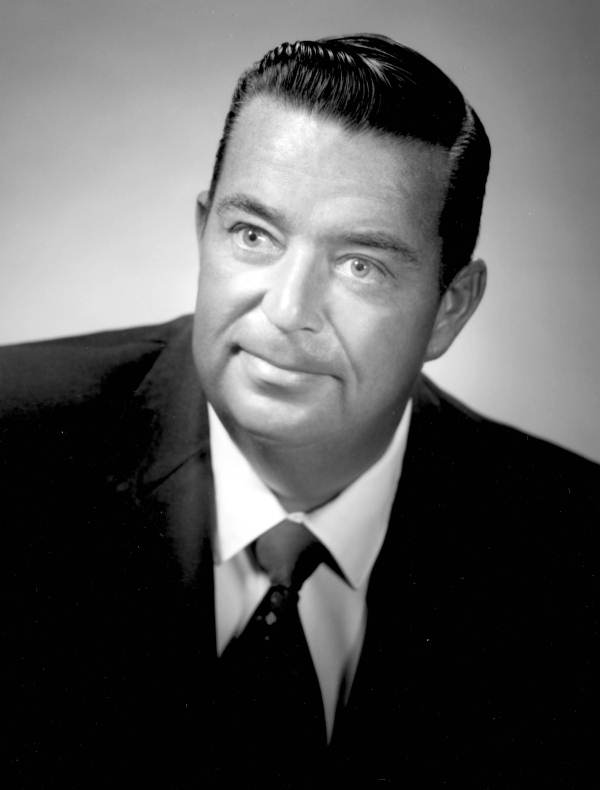
- Ewing in 1976

Member of the Florida House of Representatives from the 74th district
- In office November 2, 1976 – November 2, 1982
- Preceded by: Bob Johnson
- Succeeded by: Fred Dudley

Personal details
- Born: June 3, 1932 Detroit, Michigan, U.S.
- Died: October 16, 2015 (aged 83)
- Party: Republican
- Education: Notre Dame University; Wayne State University

Ted Ewing (June 3, 1932 – October 16, 2015) was an American politician. He served as a Republican member for the 74th district of the Florida House of Representatives.

== Life and career ==
Ewing was born in Detroit, Michigan. He attended Notre Dame University and Wayne State University.

In 1976, Ewing was elected to represent the 74th district of the Florida House of Representatives, succeeding Bob Johnson. He served until 1982, when he was succeeded by Fred Dudley.

Ewing died on October 16, 2015, at the age of 83.
