= Jim Boczar =

American politician (1947–2002)

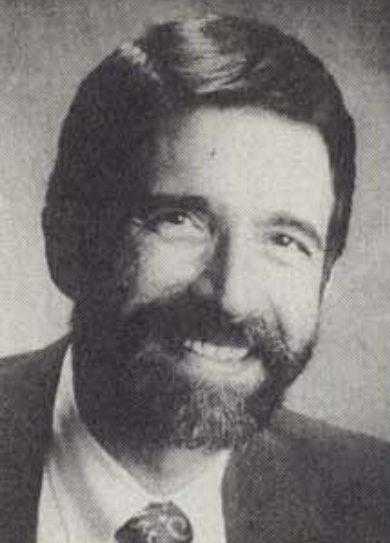

Member of the Florida Senate from the 24th district
- In office November 3, 1992 – November 8, 1994
- Preceded by: Bob Johnson (redistricting)
- Succeeded by: Katherine Harris

Personal details
- Born: March 28, 1947 Miami, Florida
- Died: January 7, 2002 (aged 54) Sarasota, Florida
- Party: Democratic
- Spouse: Linda Boczar
- Children: 4
- Education: Florida Atlantic University (B.S.); University of Miami School of Law (J.D.)
- Occupation: Attorney

James Boczar (March 28, 1947 – January 7, 2002) was a Democratic politician from Florida who served as a member of the Florida Senate from the 24th district from 1992 to 1994.

Boczar was elected to the Florida Senate from the 24th district district in 1992, defeating incumbent Republican State Senator Bob Johnson. He ran for re-election in 1994, and was defeated by Katherine Harris. He died on January 7, 2002.
