= James A. Shanks High School =

School in Florida, United States

Coordinates: 30°35′29″N 84°35′38″W

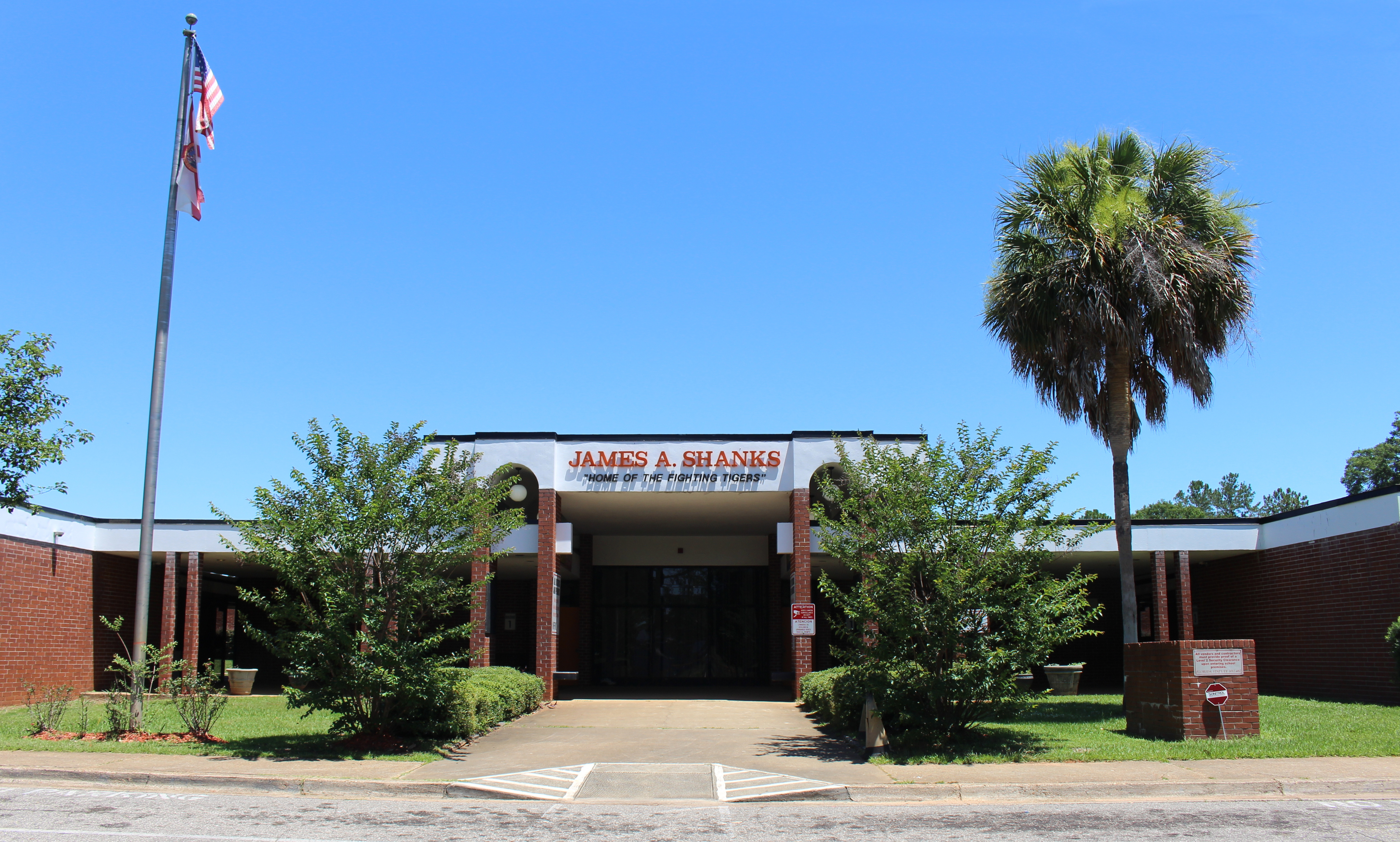
James A. Shanks Middle School (formerly James A. Shanks High School)

James A. Shanks High School (JASHS) was a senior high school in Quincy, Florida. It was a part of the Gadsden County School District and was converted into James A. Shanks Middle School.

== History ==
The building opened in 1968.

In 1999, a Florida Trend article written by Cynthia Barnett described Shanks High as being "dilapidated". The school had been on a list of "failing schools" until 1999, when the test scores improved. By 2003, the school was again on a failing school list, and families qualified for school vouchers. According to Gerald Ensley of the Tallahassee Democrat, the condition of the school caused many families to send their children to Leon County Schools campuses and/or to private schools.

In its final year it had 650 students. In 2003, the school merged with Havana Northside High School to form East Gadsden High School, located midway between Quincy and Havana. The building is now used as James A. Shanks Middle School. The building was converted into James A. Shanks Middle School.

== Athletics ==
Circa 1970 the school had many athletes that matriculated to university sports teams. 19 students graduating from Shanks from 1993 to 2000 attended universities on football scholarships for National Collegiate Athletic Association (NCAA) Division I teams. Brian Miller of the Tallahassee Democrat stated that the school was known as the "epicenter" of the county's "athletic prowess". Corry Field was used for home games.

Miller stated that the 2000s high school mergers damaged the school athletic spirit in the county as the former school identities were discarded.

== Notable alumni ==
- Curtis Green - played defensive end for the Detroit Lions
- Lieutenant General Ben Hodges (class of 1976) - Commander, United States Army Europe
- Dexter Lamar Jackson (class of 1995) - Played safety for the Tampa Bay Buccaneers
- Willie Simmons - college football head coach and former quarterback
