= Bart Knight =

American politician

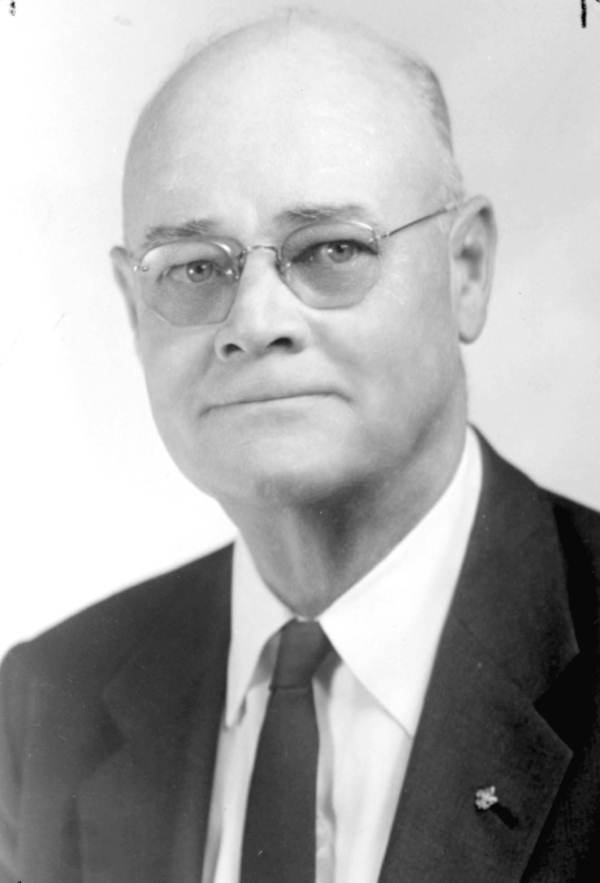
- Knight in 1953

Member of the Florida House of Representatives from Calhoun County
- In office 1953–1956

Member of the Florida Senate from the 25th district
- In office 1957–1959
- Preceded by: George Tapper
- Succeeded by: Dempsey Barron

Personal details
- Born: July 24, 1901
- Died: April 8, 1974 (aged 72)
- Party: Democratic

Marion B. "Bart" Knight (July 24, 1901 – April 8, 1974) was an American politician in the state of Florida. He served in the Florida House of Representatives and Florida Senate.

A Democrat, he represented Calhoun County, Florida.
