= Florida's 24th Senate district =

Florida's 24th State Senate district
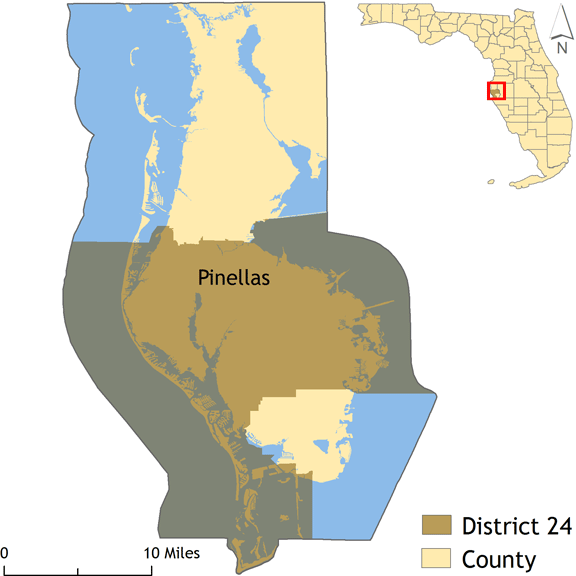
Senator
| Mack Bernard; D–West Palm Beach |

Florida's 24th Senate district elects one member to the Florida State Senate. It contains parts of Palm Beach County. It was previously based in Pinellas County, Florida.

== Members ==
- Jim Boczar (until 1994)
- Katherine Harris (1994–1998)
- Lisa Carlton (1998–2002)
- Bobby Powell (2022–2024)
- Mack Bernard (since 2024)
