= T. Truett Ott =

American judge and politician

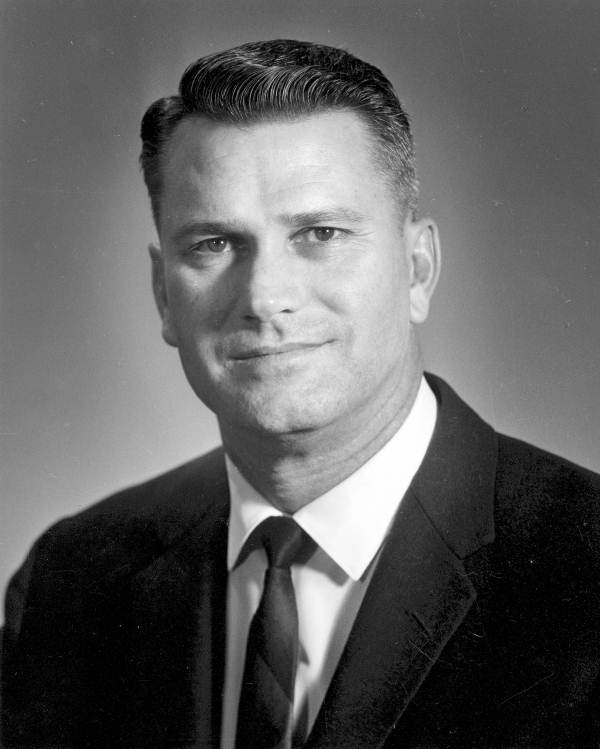
- Ott in 1968

Member of the Florida Senate from the 25th district
- In office 1966–1972

Judge of the Florida Second District Court of Appeal
- In office 1977–1985

Personal details
- Born: October 25, 1920 Osyka, Mississippi, U.S.
- Died: May 14, 2005 (aged 84)
- Party: Democratic
- Education: Hinds Junior College; University of Florida
- Occupation: Judge

T. Truett Ott (October 25, 1920 – May 14, 2005) was an American judge and politician. He served as a Democratic member of the Florida Senate.

== Life and career ==
Ott was born in Osyka, Mississippi. He attended Hinds Junior College and the University of Florida.

Ott served in the Florida Senate from 1966 to 1972.

In 1976, Ott was elected to serve as a judge for the Florida Second District Court of Appeal, serving until 1985.

Ott died on May 14, 2005, at the age of 84.
