= Dempsey Barron =

American politician (1922–2001)

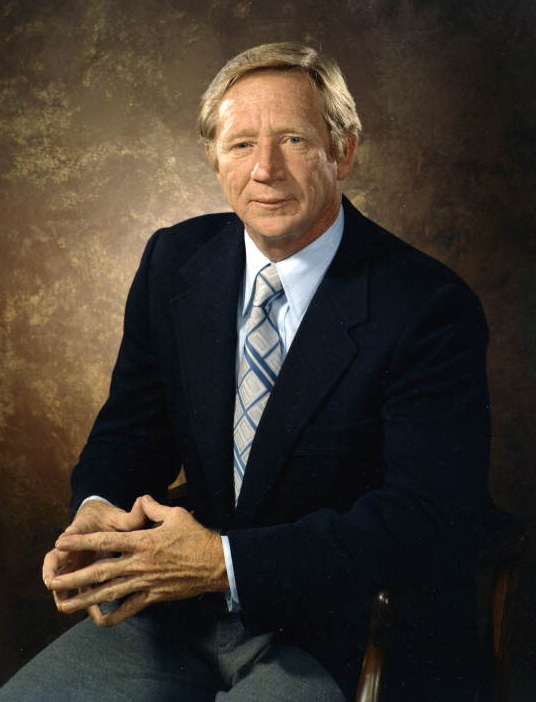

President of the Florida Senate
- In office November 19, 1974 – November 16, 1976
- Preceded by: Mallory Horne
- Succeeded by: Lew Brantley

Member of the Florida Senate
- In office April 4, 1961 – November 8, 1988
- Preceded by: Bart Knight
- Succeeded by: Vince Bruner
- Constituency: 25th (1960–1967); 4th (1967–1972); 3rd (1972–1988)

Personal details
- Born: March 5, 1922 Andalusia, Alabama
- Died: July 7, 2001 (aged 79) Tallahassee, Florida
- Party: Democratic
- Spouse: Terri Jo Barron

Dempsey James Barron (March 5, 1922 – July 7, 2001) was an American attorney, businessman, rancher, and politician. He served as President Pro-Tempore of the Florida Senate from 1967 to 1968, and as President from 1975 to 1976. He also was a long-standing Chairman of the Senate Rules Committee. He died of complications from Alzheimer's disease, Parkinson's disease and heart problems on July 7, 2001.

He was born in Andalusia, Alabama. He was living in Florida in 1924.

== Education ==
Barron attended Florida State University and also the University of Florida College of Law.

== Career ==
He served in the U.S. Navy.
