= Kirkville, Louisiana =

Unincorporated community in Louisiana

- Unincorporated community
- Location within Louisiana Location within the United States
- Coordinates: 30°59′44″N 90°28′42″W
- Country: United States
- State: Louisiana
- Parish: Tangipahoa
- Elevation: 243 ft (74 m)
- Time zone: UTC-6 (Central (CST))
  - Summer (DST): UTC-5 (CDT)
- Area code: 985
- GNIS feature ID: 549695

Kirkville is an unincorporated community in Tangipahoa Parish, Louisiana, United States. The community is located 1 mile (1.61 kilometres) S of Osyka, Mississippi and 18 miles (28.97 kilometres) N of Amite City, Louisiana

== History ==
As German immigrants arrived at New Orleans they settled in Osyka, Mississippi and overflowed south into Louisiana. The land across the Louisiana state line was not a part of Mississippi and could not be called Osyka. The community took the name Kirkville and is named after Lawrence Alexander Kirk, a railroad surveyor that owned a large portion of the land.
