= Basketball at the 2014 South American Games =

There were 2 basketball events at the 2014 South American Games. Argentina won gold in both events.

== Medal summary ==
Eventitty	Gold	Silver	Bronze
Men	Argentina	Chile	Colombia
Women	Argentina	Chile	Colombia

=== Medal table ===
Rank	Nation	Gold	Silver	Bronze	Total
1	Argentina (ARG)	2	0	0	2
2	Chile (CHI)	0	2	0	2
3	Colombia (COL)	0	0	2	2
Totals (3 entries)		2	2	2	6

== Men's basketball ==
=== Group stage ===
Team	Pld	W	L	PF	PA	PD	Pts
Argentina	4	4	0	343	169	+174	8
Chile	4	3	1	268	234	+34	7
Colombia	4	2	2	281	236	+45	6
Bolivia	4	1	3	197	306	−109	5
Ecuador	4	0	4	197	341	−144	4

11 March 2014

Argentina	108–35	Ecuador
Scoring by quarter: 24–4, 27–8, 30–6, 27–17

11 March 2014

Chile	76–47	Bolivia
Scoring by quarter: 15–14, 13–4, 30–11, 18–18

12 March 2014

Argentina	74–43	Colombia
Scoring by quarter: 19–11, 20–9, 12–9, 23–14

12 March 2014

Chile	70–50	Ecuador

13 March 2014

Bolivia	37–82	Argentina

13 March 2014

Colombia	92–52	Ecuador

14 March 2014

Bolivia	71–60	Ecuador

14 March 2014

Colombia	58–68	Chile

15 March 2014

Bolivia	42–88	Colombia
Scoring by quarter: 15–20, 3–14, 10-29, 14-25

15 March 2014

Chile	54–79	Argentina
Scoring by quarter: 10-15, 9-19, 17-18, 18–27

=== Bronze-medal match ===
16 March 2014

Colombia	80–72	Bolivia
Scoring by quarter: 24–8, 14-26, 19–16, 23–22

=== Gold-medal match ===
16 March 2014

Argentina	85–54	Chile
Scoring by quarter: 25–4, 14-19, 20–13, 26–18

== Women's basketball ==
=== Group stage ===
Team	Pld	W	L	PF	PA	PD	Pts
Argentina	5	5	0	453	255	+198	10
Chile	5	4	1	361	380	−19	9
Colombia	5	3	2	339	301	+38	8
Paraguay	5	2	3	330	403	−73	7
Ecuador	5	1	4	283	299	−16	6
Bolivia	5	0	5	294	422	−128	5

11 March 2014

[Boxscore]

Ecuador	62–63	Paraguay
Scoring by quarter: 18–12, 11–18, 16–15, 17–18

11 March 2014

[Boxscore]

Argentina	75–48	Colombia
Scoring by quarter: 21–7, 11–15, 21–16, 22–10

11 March 2014

[Boxscore]

Chile	80–66	Bolivia
Scoring by quarter: 22–18, 23–14, 22–22, 13–12

12 March 2014

[Boxscore]

Paraguay	80–62	Bolivia
Scoring by quarter: 12–28, 22–11, 26–8, 20–15

12 March 2014

[Boxscore]

Argentina	63–54	Ecuador
Scoring by quarter: 16-9, 17-23, 11-12, 19–10

12 March 2014

Colombia	65–68	Chile
Scoring by quarter: 15–16, 16–15, 18–17, 16-20

13 March 2014

Bolivia	59–83	Colombia

13 March 2014

Paraguay	47–95	Argentina

13 March 2014

Chile	64–62	Ecuador

14 March 2014

Argentina	113–49	Bolivia

14 March 2014

Colombia	51–39	Ecuador

14 March 2014

Paraguay	80–92	Chile

15 March 2014

Bolivia	58–66	Ecuador

15 March 2014

Colombia	92–60	Paraguay

15 March 2014

Chile	57–107	Argentina

=== Bronze-medal match ===
16 March 2014

Colombia	85–47	Paraguay
Scoring by quarter: 16–13, 21-6, 28–16, 20–12

=== Gold-medal match ===
16 March 2014

Argentina	85–80 (OT)	Chile
Scoring by quarter: 25–14, 10-15, 17-26, 20–16, Overtime: 14-9
