= Donald Heath (politician) =

American politician (1928–2011)

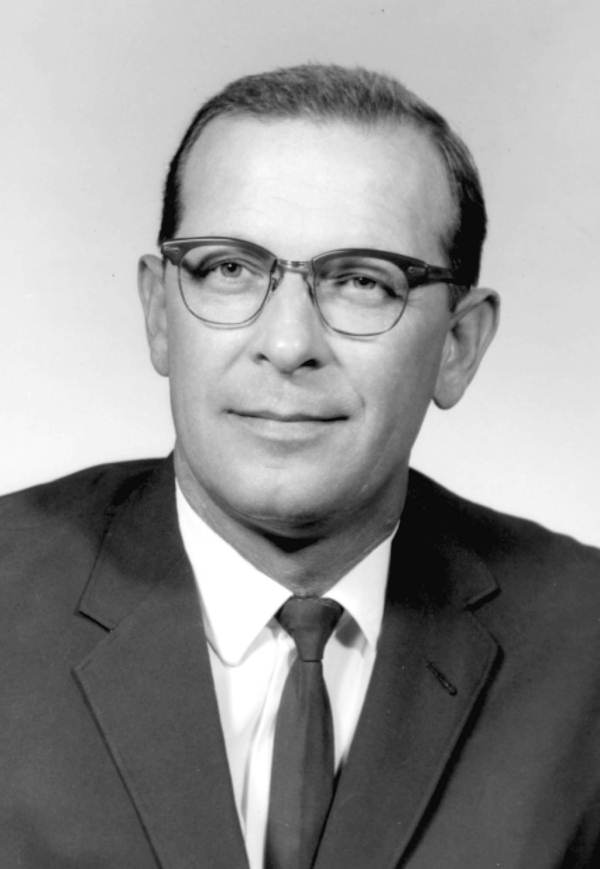
- Heath in 1968

Member of the Florida House of Representatives from the 118th district
- In office November 5, 1968 – November 3, 1970
- Preceded by: Kent McKinley
- Succeeded by: Bob Johnson

Personal details
- Born: Donald Edward Heath; October 29, 1928 Waukegan, Illinois, U.S.
- Died: July 28, 2011 (aged 82) Rome, Georgia, U.S.
- Party: Republican

Donald Edward Heath (October 29, 1928 – July 28, 2011) was an American politician. He served as a Republican member for the 118th district of the Florida House of Representatives from 1968 to 1970.

== Life and career ==
Heath was born in Waukegan, Illinois. He served in the United States Army.

In 1968, Heath was elected to represent the 118th district of the Florida House of Representatives, succeeding Kent McKinley. He served until 1970, when he was succeeded by Bob Johnson.

Heath died on July 28, 2011 in Rome, Georgia, at the age of 82.
