= Robert Hall (basketball) =

American basketball player (1927–2014)

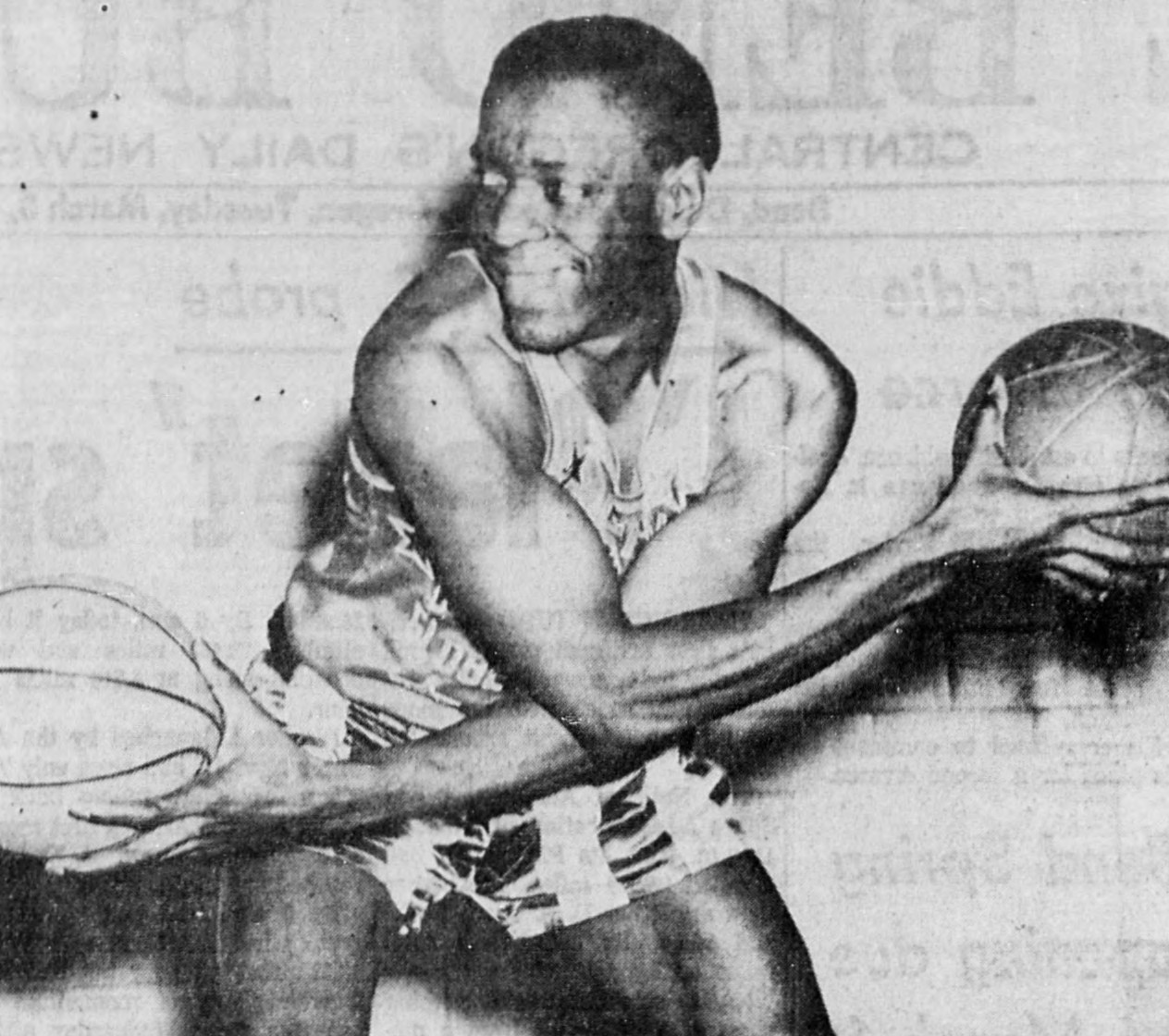
Hall, circa 1959

Robert "Showboat" Hall (September 30, 1927 – December 24, 2014) was an American basketball player and member of the Harlem Globetrotters. He attended and played basketball at the former Miller High School in Detroit. He joined the Globetrotters in 1949, and in 1955 succeeded Reece "Goose" Tatum as the team's primary showman. In 1968 he became player-coach, and played in more than 5,000 games before his retirement in 1974.

Hall died in his hometown of Detroit on 24 December 2014. He was 87.
