= Havana Northside High School =

- Northside High School
- U.S. National Register of Historic Places
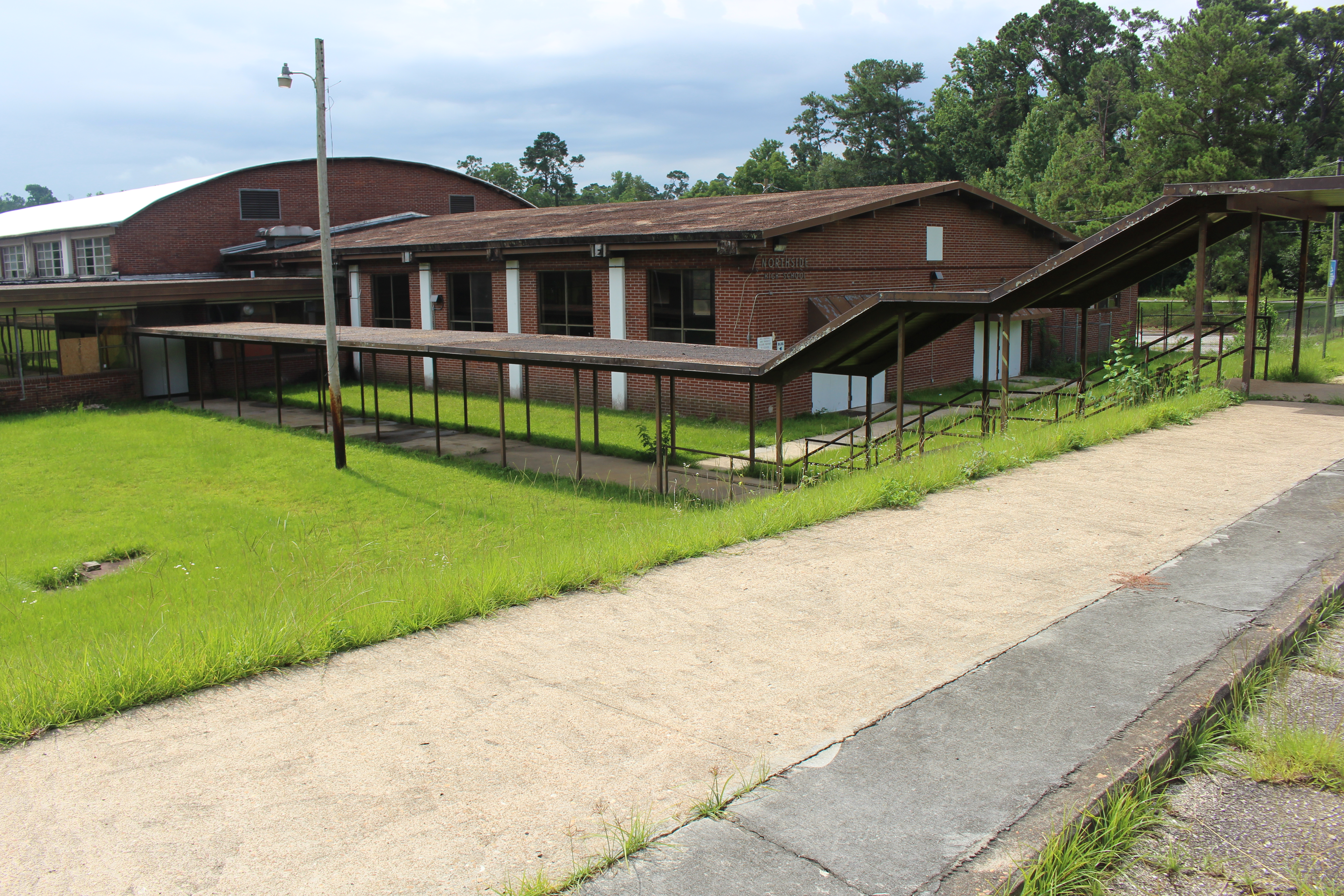

- Location within Florida Location within the United States
- Location: Havana, Florida
- Coordinates: 30°38′17″N 84°24′46″W
- NRHP reference No.: 100003408
- Added to NRHP: February 4, 2019

Havana Northside High School was a senior high school in Havana, Florida, and a part of the Gadsden County School District. The school mascot was the gladiator and the school colors were brown and gold. It was added to the National Register of Historic Places in 2019.

== History ==
Northside High School, initially a grade 7-12 school, opened on August 2, 1962. Initially there were 506 students. The 1962 Student Council sponsored the vote, decided by students and faculty, for the school colors and mascot. There were 640 students and 30 faculty members by the end of the 1965–1966 school year. It served African American children until 1970.

The school's name and grade configuration changed multiple times up until the 1980s. The school was known as Northside School from fall 1970 until spring 1971, then Havana High School from Spring 1971 until fall of 1980, when the school began using its final name. The school's grade configuration was changed to 6–9 in fall 1970, but became 9-12 by fall 1971. From fall 1981 to 1988 the school included 8th graders, but after that point it remained a 9-12 school.

According to Gerald Ensley of the Tallahassee Democrat, by 2003 the condition of the school caused many families to send their children to Leon County Schools campuses and/or to private schools.

In 2003 the school merged with James A. Shanks High School to form East Gadsden High School, located in an unincorporated area of the county. The school district stopped using the building of Havana Northside, which in its final year had 350 students, altogether.

Brian Miller of the Tallahassee Democrat stated that the 2000s high school mergers damaged the school athletic spirit in the county as the former school identities were discarded.

== Campus ==
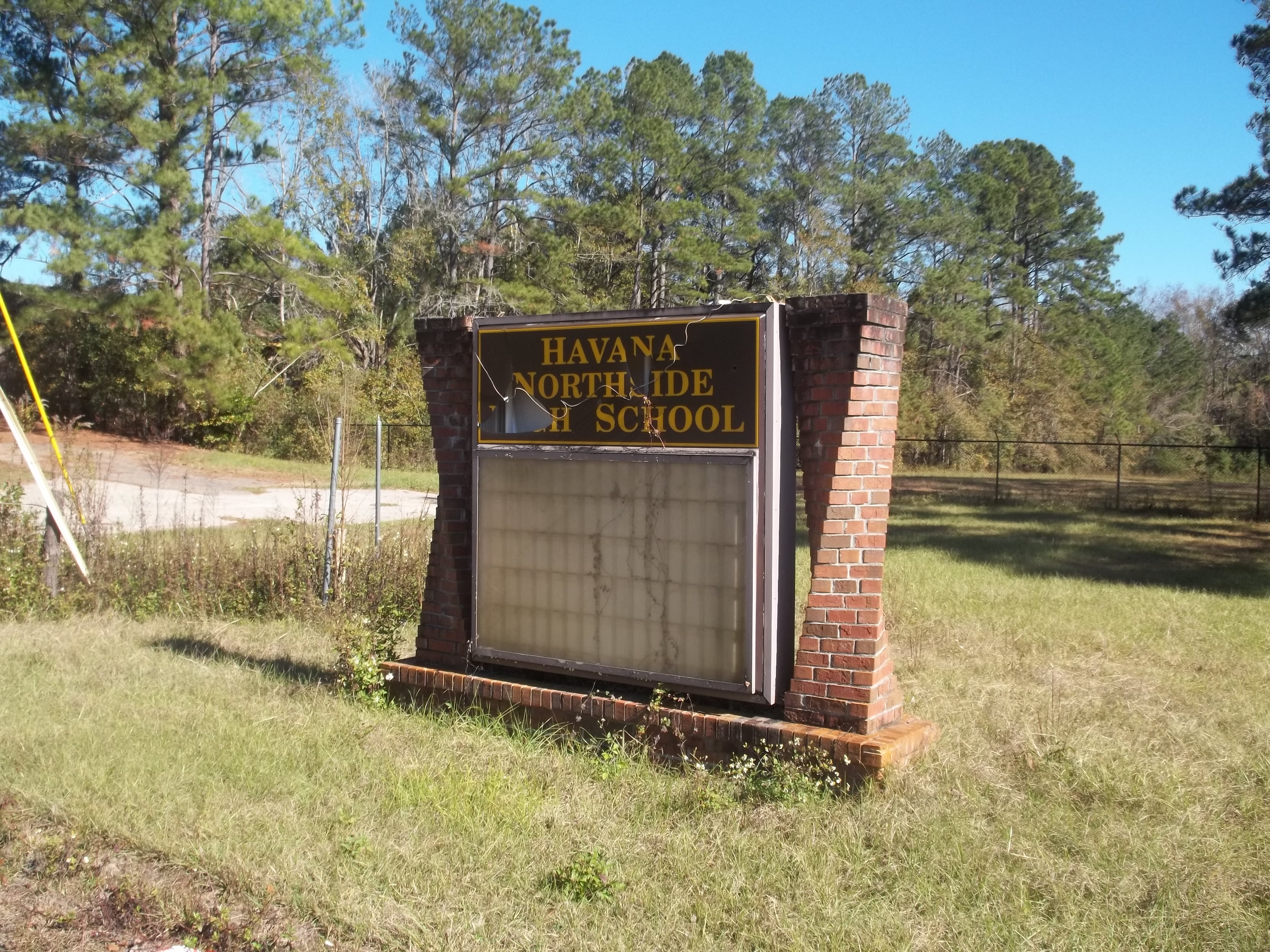
School sign

Initially the campus included an academic building with 14 general purpose classrooms, a wing dedicated to agricultural classes, and special rooms for music, science, home economics, offices, and student guidance. There was also a cafeteria and gymnasium as well as eight portable classroom facilities.
