= Maryna Doroshenko =

Ukrainian basketball player

Maryna Olegіvna Doroshenko (née Khabarova; 22 March 1981 – 7 September 2014) was a Ukrainian basketball player.

Born in Marhanets, Doroshenko was a seven-time champion of Ukraine and a two-time winner of the Cup of Ukraine.

In 2013, she was diagnosed with acute myeloblastic leukemia. In January 2014, the disease worsened. Doroshenko died on 7 September 2014 at the age of 33.
