= E. W. Foy =

American basketball coach

Biographical details
- Born: February 6, 1937; New Orleans, Louisiana, U.S.
- Died: June 7, 2014 (aged 77); Summit, Mississippi, U.S.
- Education: William Carey University; LSU

Coaching career (HC unless noted)
- 1969–1974: Southeastern Louisiana
- 1974–1977: McNeese State

Head coaching record
- Overall: 116–90

Accomplishments and honors

Championships
- Southland Conference Championship

Awards
- Gulf South Conference Coach of the Year (1972–1973); Southland Conference Coach of the Year

Ernest William Foy (February 6, 1937 – June 7, 2014) was an American college and high school basketball coach.

== Biography ==
Born in New Orleans, Louisiana, and raised in Osyka, Mississippi, Foy graduated from Osyka High School in 1955, graduated Southwest Mississippi Community College in 1957, and attended William Carey University on a basketball scholarship, obtaining a BS degree in math with a minor in health and physical education. He later earned a Master of Science degree from LSU in 1969.

Foy's first teaching and coaching position was at Baton Rouge Junior High School from 1959 until 1962. In September 1962, he became head coach, going on to lead an undefeated basketball team to the 1968 State 4-A Championship. He was named Coach of the Year. In 1969, he became head coach at Southeastern Louisiana University. In the 1972–1973 season, he led the Lions to its first conference title in the school history and was named Gulf South Conference Coach of the Year. From 1974 until 1977, he served as head coach at McNeese State University, guiding the Cowboys to its first Southland Conference Championship. He was also named Coach of the Year.

In 1977, he moved to McComb, Mississippi to own and operate the Western Auto Associate Store. In 2000, he became the head coach of the boys' basketball team at Parklane Academy, which went to the state play-offs for the first time in ten years. In 2012, he ended his coaching career at the Amite School Center in Liberty, Mississippi.

== Awards ==
- SMJC Sports Hall of Fame (1980)
- Mississippi Association of Community College Sports Hall of Fame (2012)
- William Carey University Sports Hall of Fame (2012)

== Death ==
On June 7, 2014, Foy died in Summit, Mississippi, at the age of 77. He was survived by Betty Jane Beregi Foy, his wife of 57 years, and their three children.
