= Osyka, Mississippi =

- Town
- Location of Osyka, Mississippi

- Location in the United States
- Coordinates: 31°0′26″N 90°28′16″W
- Country: United States
- State: Mississippi
- County: Pike

Area
  - Total: 1.07 sq mi (2.76 km^{2})
  - Land: 1.06 sq mi (2.74 km^{2})
  - Water: 0.0077 sq mi (0.02 km^{2})
- Elevation: 266 ft (81 m)

Population (2020)
  - Total: 381
  - Density: 360/sq mi (138.9/km^{2})
- Time zone: UTC-6 (Central (CST))
  - Summer (DST): UTC-5 (CDT)
- ZIP code: 39657
- Area code: 601
- FIPS code: 28-54640
- GNIS feature ID: 0675322

Osyka is a town in Pike County, Mississippi, United States. It is located on the Mississippi–Louisiana state line. As of the 2020 census, Osyka had a population of 381. It is part of the McComb, Mississippi Micropolitan Statistical Area. The peak of its population was in 1910.

== History ==
The community was named after Ossika ("The Eagle"), a Choctaw chieftain.

== Geography ==
Osyka is located at 31°0′26″N 90°28′16″W (31.007196, -90.471165).

According to the United States Census Bureau, the town has a total area of 1.0 square mile (2.6 km^{2}), of which 1.0 square mile (2.6 km^{2}) is land and 0.96% is water.

== Demographics ==
Historical population
Census	Pop.	Note	%±
1880	542		—
1890	742		36.9%
1900	784		5.7%
1910	824		5.1%
1920	704		−14.6%
1930	750		6.5%
1940	769		2.5%
1950	724		−5.9%
1960	712		−1.7%
1970	628		−11.8%
1980	581		−7.5%
1990	483		−16.9%
2000	481		−0.4%
2010	440		−8.5%
2020	381		−13.4%
U.S. Decennial Census

=== 2020 census ===
Osyka Racial Composition
Race	Num.	Perc.
White	165	43.31%
Black or African American	190	49.87%
Native American	1	0.26%
Asian	3	0.79%
Other/Mixed	14	3.67%
Hispanic or Latino	8	2.1%

As of the 2020 United States census, there were 381 people, 154 households, and 102 families residing in the town.

=== 2000 census ===
As of the census of 2000, there were 481 people, 193 households, and 132 families residing in the town. The population density was 468.1 inhabitants per square mile (180.7/km^{2}). There were 234 housing units at an average density of 227.7 per square mile (87.9/km^{2}). The racial makeup of the town was 53.01% White, 44.91% African American, 0.83% Native American, 0.42% Asian, and 0.83% from two or more races.

There were 193 households, out of which 32.1% had children under the age of 18 living with them, 46.6% were married couples living together, 16.1% had a female householder with no husband present, and 31.6% were non-families. 31.6% of all households were made up of individuals, and 19.2% had someone living alone who was 65 years of age or older. The average household size was 2.49 and the average family size was 3.12.

In the town, the population was spread out, with 28.9% under the age of 18, 8.7% from 18 to 24, 23.9% from 25 to 44, 19.8% from 45 to 64, and 18.7% who were 65 years of age or older. The median age was 35 years. For every 100 females, there were 87.2 males. For every 100 females age 18 and over, there were 81.0 males.

The median income for a household in the town was $17,813, and the median income for a family was $25,078. Males had a median income of $21,750 versus $12,500 for females. The per capita income for the town was $11,550. About 27.1% of families and 29.8% of the population were below the poverty line, including 51.6% of those under age 18 and 25.8% of those age 65 or over.

== Education ==
The Town of Osyka is served by the South Pike School District.

Pike County is in the district of Southwest Mississippi Community College.

== Notable people ==
- Jim Brumfield, former National Football League running back
- Otto Colee, college football player and dental surgeon
- Lewis Wesley Cutrer, Mayor of Houston, Texas from 1957 to 1963
- E. W. Foy, basketball coach
- Henry W. McMillan, Adjutant General of Florida from 1962 to 1975
- T. Truett Ott, judge and member of the Florida Senate from 1966 to 1972
- Olympia Vernon, author

== See also ==
- Kirkville, Louisiana
