= George Tapper =

American politician

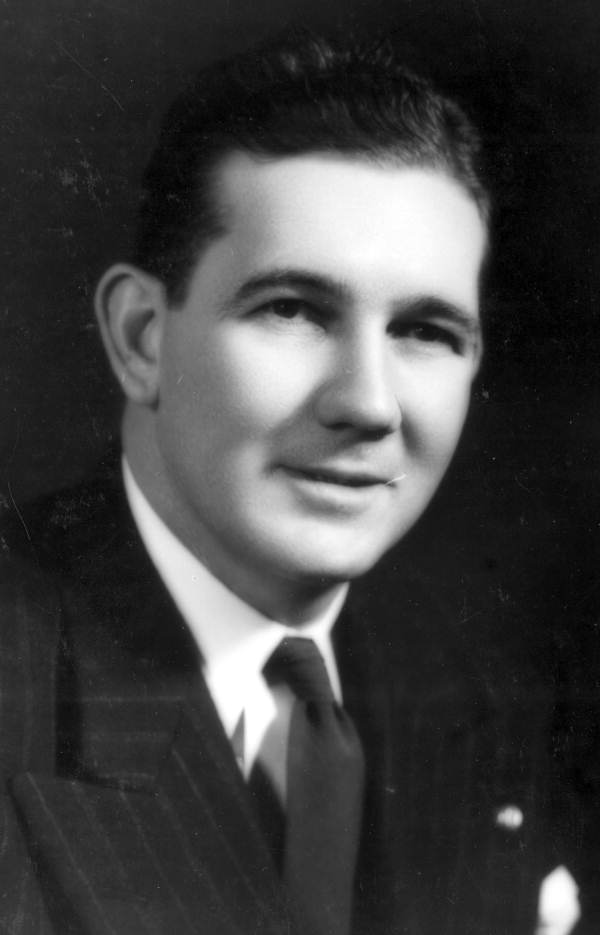
- Tapper in 1947

Member of the Florida House of Representatives from Gulf County
- In office 1947–1951

Member of the Florida Senate from the 25th district
- In office 1953–1956
- Preceded by: Carl R. Gray
- Succeeded by: Bart Knight

Member of the Florida Senate from the 5th district
- In office 1965
- Preceded by: Charles Henry Bourke Floyd II
- Succeeded by: Hal Davis

Personal details
- Born: October 1, 1916
- Died: June 1, 1986 (aged 69)
- Party: Democratic

George G. Tapper (October 1, 1916 – June 1, 1986) was an American politician. He served as a Democratic member of the Florida House of Representatives. He also served as a member for the 5th and 25th district of the Florida Senate.

The bridge carrying U.S. Route 98 over the Gulf County Canal in Port St. Joe, Florida is named after Tapper.
