= 2014 FIBA Asia Champions Cup =

Edition of the FIBA Asia Champions Cup

25th Asia Champions Cup

Tournament details
- Host country: Kuwait
- Dates: TBD
- Teams: 10 (from 44 federations)
- Venue: TBD (in TBD host cities)

Official website
- 2014 FIBA Asia Champions Cup

The 2014 FIBA Asia Champions Cup will be the 25th staging of the FIBA Asia Champions Cup, the international basketball club tournament of FIBA Asia. The tournament was supposed to be held in Kuwait on June 5–13, 2014, but FIBA Asia, through a communique to the National Federations representing the qualified teams, had announced that the tournament will be rescheduled after the 2014 FIBA Asia Under-18 Championship for Women sometime in the third-fourth week of October, after they (National Federations) mentioned that they require their top players to be available for the National Team's preparations for the 2014 FIBA Basketball World Cup and the 2014 Asian Games.

== Qualification ==
The qualifications for the 2014 FIBA Asia Champions Cup are still ongoing; it started this early 2014 with the Gulf region, West Asia, Southeast Asia, East Asia, Central Asia and South Asia each conducting tournaments.

=== Format ===
The following are eligible to participate:

- The organizing country.
- The three best-placed teams from the 2013 FIBA Asia Champions Cup will qualify the same number of teams from their respective sub-zones.
- The best team from the sub-zones of East Asia, Gulf, Southeast Asia and West Asia and the winner from the sub-zones of South Asia and Central Asia.

Berths

Zone	Automatic	Additional berths from 2013 FIBA Asia Champions Cup	Total
Host team	1	—N/a	1
Central Asia	1	0	1
East Asia	1	0	1
Gulf	1	1	2
South Asia	1	0	1
Southeast Asia	1	0	1
West Asia	1	2	3

=== 2013 FIBA Asia Champions Cup ===
Rank	Team	Note
1st place, gold medalist(s)	Iran	West Asia (+1)
2nd place, silver medalist(s)	Qatar	Gulf (+1)
3rd place, bronze medalist(s)	Jordan	West Asia (+2)
4	Bahrain	
5	Iraq	
6	Syria	
7	Kazakhstan	
8	India	

=== Qualified teams ===
Host
Automatic berth
Additional berth from 2013 FIBA Asia Champions Cup

Central Asia (1)	East Asia (1)	Gulf (1+1+1)	South Asia (1)	Southeast Asia (1)	West Asia (1+2)
(Turkmenistan) Belent Ashgabat		(Kuwait)		Malaysia BC	(Iran) Mahram Tehran
		(Qatar) Al-Sadd			(Jordan) ASU
		(United Arab Emirates) Al-Ahli			(Iraq) Al-Kahraba

=== Central Asia ===
Turkmenistan's Belent Ashgabat will be the CABA subzone's representative to the 2014 FIBA Asia Champions Cup.

=== Gulf ===
Qatar's Al-Sadd and UAE's Al-Ahli have qualified to represent Gulf subzone, and a team representing Kuwait has qualified automatically as the hosts.

=== Southeast Asia ===
The 2014 SEABA Champions Cup was the qualification for Southeast Asia in the 2014 FIBA Asia Champions Cup. It was a single game between Malaysia and Singapore and was held on April 26, 2014, in Kuala Lumpur, Malaysia. After intense and hard-fought three quarters, the home team pulled out a 17–9 scoring in the final frame to claim the lone SEABA spot, 59–47.

Qualified at the 2014 FIBA Asia Champions Cup

Team	Pld	W	L	PF	PA	PD	Pts
Malaysia	1	1	0	59	47	+12	2
Singapore	1	0	1	47	59	–12	1

April 26
19:30

Live Stats

Malaysia	59–47	Singapore
Scoring by quarter: 10–10, 18–16, 14–12, 17–9

MABA Stadium, Kuala Lumpur
Referees: Ricor Buaron (PHI), Herman (INA), Linn Maung (MYA)

=== West Asia ===
The 2014 WABA Champions Cup was the qualifying tournament for the 2014 FIBA Asia Champions Cup. The three best teams qualify for 2014 FIBA Asia Champions Cup. The tournament was held from March 8 to March 13, 2014, in Tehran, Iran.

==== Preliminary round ====
===== Group A =====
Team	Pld	W	L	PF	PA	PD	Pts
(Iran) Mahram Tehran	2	2	0	194	113	+81	4
(Syria) Al-Wahda	2	1	1	123	166	–43	3
(Jordan) Al-Ittihad	2	0	2	113	151	–38	2

March 8
16:00

Box Score

Mahram Tehran (Iran)	106–60	(Syria) Al-Wahda
Scoring by quarter: 26–16, 25–11, 31–17, 24–16

Azadi Basketball Hall, Tehran

March 9
14:00

Box Score

Al-Ittihad (Jordan)	60–63	(Syria) Al-Wahda
Scoring by quarter: 11–18, 21–12, 9–12, 19–21

Azadi Basketball Hall, Tehran

March 10
16:00

Box Score

Al-Ittihad (Jordan)	53–88	(Iran) Mahram Tehran
Scoring by quarter: 9–30, 12–17, 19–22, 13–19

Azadi Basketball Hall, Tehran

===== Group B =====
Team	Pld	W	L	PF	PA	PD	Pts
(Iran) Petrochimi Bandar Imam	3	3	0	292	193	+99	6
(Iraq) Al-Kahraba	3	2	1	238	243	–5	5
(Jordan) ASU	3	1	2	218	235	–17	4
(Syria) Al-Jaish	3	0	3	197	274	−77	3

March 8
18:00

Al-Kahraba (Iraq)	79–76	(Jordan) ASU

Azadi Basketball Hall, Tehran

March 8
20:00

Box Score

Petrochimi Bandar Imam (Iran)	105–61	(Syria) Al-Jaish
Scoring by quarter: 26–10, 20–20, 25–9, 22–16

Azadi Basketball Hall, Tehran

March 9
16:00

Box Score

ASU (Jordan)	79–57	(Syria) Al-Jaish
Scoring by quarter: 8–24, 23–9, 22–12, 26–12

Azadi Basketball Hall, Tehran

March 9
18:00

Box Score

Petrochimi Bandar Imam (Iran)	88–69	(Iraq) Al-Kahraba
Scoring by quarter: 26–10, 20–20, 25–9, 22–16

Azadi Basketball Hall, Tehran

March 10
14:00

Box Score

ASU (Jordan)	63–99	(Iran) Petrochimi Bandar Imam
Scoring by quarter: 15–19, 9–28, 23–24, 16–28

Azadi Basketball Hall, Tehran

March 10
18:00

Box Score

Al-Jaish (Syria)	79–90 (OT)	(Iraq) Al-Kahraba
Scoring by quarter: 12–17, 21–14, 13–12, 23–26, Overtime: 10–21

Azadi Basketball Hall, Tehran

==== Final round ====
Quarterfinals
March 11
(Iran) Petrochimi Bandar Imam
BYE
March 11
(Syria) Al-Wahda	86
(Jordan) ASU (OT)	88
March 11
(Iraq) Al-Kahraba	89
(Jordan) Al-Ittihad	76
March 11
(Iran) Mahram Tehran	106
(Syria) Al-Jaish	59

Semifinals
March 12
(Iran) Petrochimi Bandar Imam	82
(Jordan) ASU	64
March 12
(Iraq) Al-Kahraba	87
(Iran) Mahram Tehran	112

Final
March 13
(Iran) Petrochimi Bandar Imam	73
(Iran) Mahram Tehran	90
3rd place
March 13
(Jordan) ASU	79
(Iraq) Al-Kahraba	65

===== Quarterfinals =====
March 11
14:00

Live Stats

Al-Kahraba (Iraq)	89–76	(Jordan) Al-Ittihad
Scoring by quarter: 30–16, 21–10, 23–22, 15–28

Azadi Basketball Hall, Tehran

March 11
16:00

Live Stats

Mahram Tehran (Iran)	106–59	(Syria) Al-Jaish
Scoring by quarter: 11–18, 21–12, 9–12, 19–21

Azadi Basketball Hall, Tehran

March 11
18:00

Live Stats

Al-Wahda (Syria)	86–88 (OT)	(Jordan) ASU
Scoring by quarter: 19–12, 17–20, 19–23, 22–22, Overtime: 9–11

Azadi Basketball Hall, Tehran

===== Semifinals =====
March 12
15:30

Box Score

Mahram Tehran (Iran)	112–87	(Iraq) Al-Kahraba
Scoring by quarter: 25–13, 27–21, 36–26, 24–27

Azadi Basketball Hall, Tehran

March 12
18:00

Box Score

Petrochimi Bandar Imam (Iran)	82–64	(Jordan) ASU
Scoring by quarter: 26–16, 20–16, 25–25, 11–7

Azadi Basketball Hall, Tehran

===== 3rd place =====
March 13
10:30

Box Score

Al-Kahraba (Iraq)	65–79	(Jordan) ASU
Scoring by quarter: 18–16, 18–23, 17–16, 12–24

Azadi Basketball Hall, Tehran

===== Final =====
March 13
18:00

Box Score

Mahram Tehran (Iran)	90–73	(Iran) Petrochimi Bandar Imam
Scoring by quarter: 17–21, 17–22, 29–16, 27–14

Azadi Basketball Hall, Tehran

==== Final standing ====
Qualified at the 2014 FIBA Asia Champions Cup

Rank	Team
1st place, gold medalist(s)	(Iran) Mahram Tehran
2nd place, silver medalist(s)	(Iran) Petrochimi Bandar Imam
3rd place, bronze medalist(s)	(Jordan) ASU
4	(Iraq) Al-Kahraba
5	(Jordan) Al-Ittihad
6	(Syria) Al-Jaish
7	(Syria) Al-Wahda
