= Vince Bruner =

American politician (born 1957)

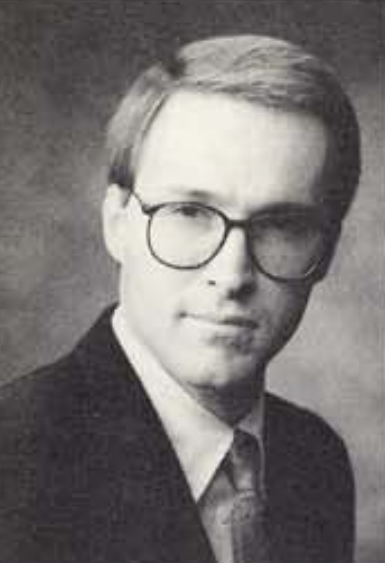

Member of the Florida Senate from the 3rd district
- In office November 8, 1988 – November 3, 1992
- Preceded by: Dempsey Barron
- Succeeded by: Robert Harden (redistricting)

Personal details
- Born: June 19, 1957 (age 69) Dothan, Alabama
- Party: Democratic (until 1992); Republican (1992–present)
- Spouse: Gae Steele
- Children: 2
- Education: Florida State University (B.A.); Cumberland School of Law (J.D.)
- Occupation: Attorney

Vince Bruner (born June 19, 1957) is an American politician from Florida who served as a member of the Florida Senate from the 3rd district from 1988 to 1992. Initially a Democrat, he switched to the Republican Party in 1992.

== Early life ==
Bruner was born in Dothan, Alabama, in 1957, and graduated from Choctawhatchee High School in 1975. He then attended Florida State University, where he played football and received his bachelor's degree in 1979, and the Cumberland School of Law at Samford University, where he received his Juris Doctor in 1983. After graduating, he practiced law in Okaloosa County, serving as an assistant state attorney from 1983 to 1985, and later as the city attorney for Fort Walton Beach and Valparaiso.

== Florida Senate ==
In 1988, Bruner ran for the Florida Senate from the 3rd district, challenging long-time State Senator Dempsey Barron for re-election in the Democratic primary. Bruner won the endorsement of the local police union, the statewide teachers' union, and an environmental advocacy group, and narrowly defeated Barron, winning 52 percent of the vote to Barron's 48 percent.

Bruner faced Republican nominee Bill Jennings in the general election. He defeated Jennings, receiving 54 percent of the vote to Jennings's 46 percent.

During Bruner's term in the legislature, he established a reputation as a conservative Democrat and had a frosty relationship with State Senate President Gwen Margolis. After Bruner joined with Republican senators in opposing a budget bill, Margolis stripped him of his chairmanship of the Corrections, Probation and Parole Committee. Bruner announced that he planned to seek re-election as a Republican, and formally switched to the Republican Party in 1992. He ultimately declined to seek re-election to a second term, citing a desire to spend more time with his family.
