= Warren Henderson =

American politician (1927–2011)

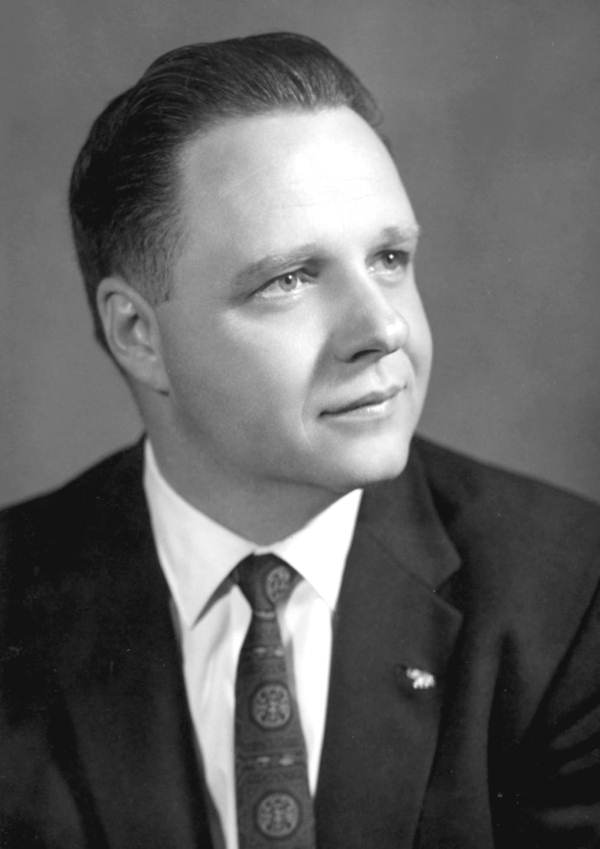
- Henderson in 1969

Member of the Florida Senate from the 25th district
- In office 1973–1984

Member of the Florida Senate from the 32nd district
- In office 1967–1971

Member of the Florida Senate from the 22nd district
- In office 1963–1965

Personal details
- Born: November 14, 1927 Exeter, New Hampshire, U.S.
- Died: October 22, 2011 (aged 83) Sarasota, Florida, U.S.
- Party: Republican
- Spouse: Polly Schurr
- Occupation: Numismatist

Warren Swasey Henderson (November 14, 1927 – October 22, 2011) was an American politician in the state of Florida.

Henderson served in the Florida State Senate from 1963 to 1965, 1967 to 1971, and 1973 to 1984, representing the 22nd, 32nd, and 25th districts. Henderson was born in Exeter, New Hampshire. He attended Denison University and the University of Florida College of Law. He was a numismatist and also worked in the investments industry. He died in 2011.

Warren Swasey Henderson was the father of Warren Charles Henderson. It was the younger Warren Henderson who held elective office in New Hampshire.
