= Havana, Florida =

Town in the state of Florida, United States

- Town
- Town of Havana
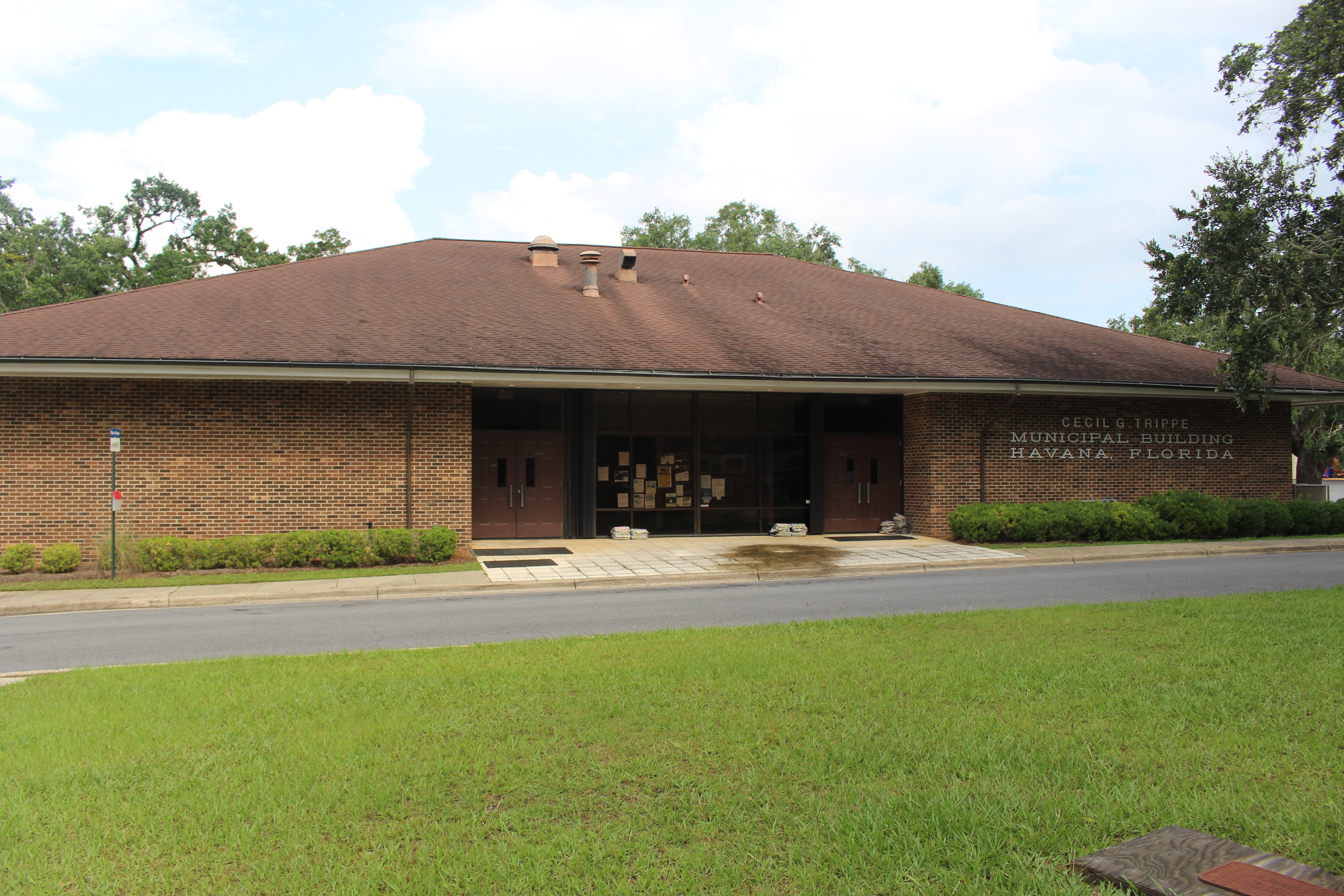
- Cecil G. Trippe Municipal Building, Havana
- Motto: "Florida's Friendliest Small Town!"
- Location in Gadsden County and the state of Florida
- Interactive map of Havana, Florida
- Coordinates: 30°37′27″N 84°24′53″W
- Country: United States
- State: Florida
- County: Gadsden
- Founded: 1902
- Incorporated: December 5, 1906
- Named for: Havana, Cuba

Government
  - Type: Council-Manager
  - Mayor: Eddie Bass
  - Mayor Pro Tem: Howard McKinnon
  - Council Members: Robert Mosby, Matthew Wesolowski, Tabatha Nelson, John Bryant, and Penny Key
  - Town Manager: Leigh Davis
  - Town Clerk: Enosha A. Williams

Area
  - Total: 2.83 sq mi (7.32 km^{2})
  - Land: 2.79 sq mi (7.22 km^{2})
  - Water: 0.039 sq mi (0.10 km^{2})
- Elevation: 246 ft (75 m)

Population (2020)
  - Total: 1,753
  - Density: 629.2/sq mi (242.92/km^{2})
- Time zone: UTC-5 (Eastern (EST))
  - Summer (DST): UTC-4 (EDT)
- ZIP code: 32333
- Area code(s): 850, 448
- FIPS code: 12-29150
- GNIS feature ID: 2405803
- Website: www.townofhavana.com

Havana is a town in Gadsden County, Florida, United States, and a suburb of Tallahassee. The population was 1,753 at the 2020 census, almost even from 1,754 at the 2010 census. It is part of the Tallahassee, Florida Metropolitan Statistical Area. The town was named after Havana, Cuba, located about 530 miles (850 km) to the south.

== History ==
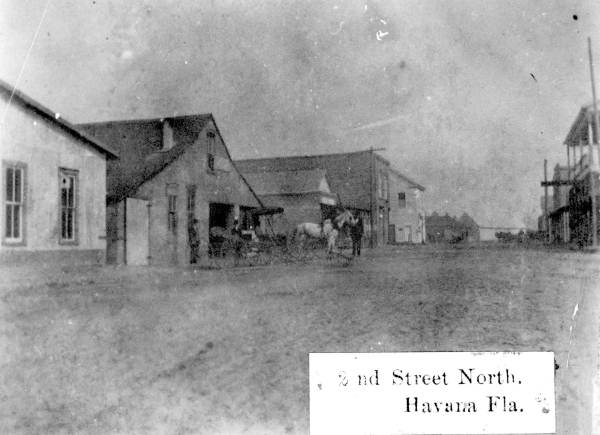
2nd Street North, Havana pictured circa 1910

The cultivation of shade tobacco began in Gadsden County, Florida around 1829. In 1902, following the completion of the Georgia, Florida and Alabama Railroad, many settlers moved a mile east to the present site of Havana, and platted it as their new community. A local teacher, James Mathewson, proposed the name "Havana". He believed the hand-rolled cigars made in this region of Florida were comparable to those from Havana, Cuba. On December 5, 1906, the Town of Havana was officially incorporated as a municipality. The railway town was important to the export of farming and tobacco.

On March 16, 1916, Havana was destroyed by a fire and 26 business-owned buildings were burned leaving only two remaining stores.

In recent times, much of the tobacco crop industry has declined and Havana is now known for its antiques, art galleries and specialty stores.

== Geography ==
The Town of Havana is located in northeastern Gadsden County on the Florida Panhandle in North Florida. U.S. Route 27 passes through the center of town, leading southeast 16 miles (26 km) to the center of Tallahassee and north 25 miles (40 km) to Bainbridge, Georgia. Florida State Road 12 intersects US 27 in Havana; it leads west 12 miles (19 km) to Quincy, the Gadsden County seat.

According to the United States Census Bureau, Havana has a total area of 2.8 square miles (7.2 km^{2}), of which 0.02 square miles (0.04 km^{2}), or 0.57%, is water.

=== Climate ===
The climate in this area is characterized by hot, humid summers and generally mild winters. According to the Köppen climate classification, the Town of Havana has a humid subtropical climate zone (Cfa).

Climate data for Havana, Florida
Month	Jan	Feb	Mar	Apr	May	Jun	Jul	Aug	Sep	Oct	Nov	Dec	Year
Record high °F (°C)	83 (28)	85 (29)	90 (32)	92 (33)	100 (38)	102 (39)	102 (39)	101 (38)	98 (37)	95 (35)	87 (31)	84 (29)	102 (39)
Mean daily maximum °F (°C)	64 (18)	67 (19)	74 (23)	79 (26)	86 (30)	90 (32)	91 (33)	90 (32)	88 (31)	81 (27)	73 (23)	66 (19)	79 (26)
Mean daily minimum °F (°C)	40 (4)	42 (6)	48 (9)	52 (11)	61 (16)	68 (20)	71 (22)	70 (21)	66 (19)	57 (14)	49 (9)	42 (6)	56 (13)
Record low °F (°C)	4 (−16)	0 (−18)	19 (−7)	31 (−1)	36 (2)	49 (9)	60 (16)	59 (15)	48 (9)	33 (1)	20 (−7)	12 (−11)	0 (−18)
Average precipitation inches (mm)	4.80 (122)	4.92 (125)	5.86 (149)	3.68 (93)	5.04 (128)	5.92 (150)	7.36 (187)	6.78 (172)	4.15 (105)	4.11 (104)	3.51 (89)	3.77 (96)	59.9 (1,520)

== Demographics ==
Historical population
Census	Pop.	Note	%±
1910	432		—
1920	448		3.7%
1930	1,169		160.9%
1940	1,221		4.4%
1950	1,634		33.8%
1960	2,090		27.9%
1970	2,022		−3.3%
1980	2,782		37.6%
1990	1,654		−40.5%
2000	1,713		3.6%
2010	1,754		2.4%
2020	1,753		−0.1%
U.S. Decennial Census

=== Racial and ethnic composition ===
Havana town, Florida – Racial and ethnic composition Note: the US Census treats Hispanic/Latino as an ethnic category. This table excludes Latinos from the racial categories and assigns them to a separate category. Hispanics/Latinos may be of any race.
Race / Ethnicity (NH = Non-Hispanic)	Pop 2000	Pop 2010	Pop 2020	% 2000	% 2010	% 2020
White alone (NH)	710	775	715	41.45%	44.18%	40.79%
Black or African American alone (NH)	968	937	899	56.51%	53.42%	51.28%
Native American or Alaska Native alone (NH)	0	2	0	0.00%	0.11%	0.00%
Asian alone (NH)	1	8	4	0.06%	0.46%	0.23%
Native Hawaiian or Pacific Islander alone (NH)	0	0	0	0.00%	0.00%	0.00%
Other race alone (NH)	4	0	2	0.23%	0.00%	0.11%
Mixed race or Multiracial (NH)	9	8	58	0.53%	0.46%	3.31%
Hispanic or Latino (any race)	21	24	75	1.23%	1.37%	4.28%
Total	1,713	1,754	1,753	100.00%	100.00%	100.00%

=== 2020 census ===
As of the 2020 census, Havana had a population of 1,753. The median age was 50.9 years. 18.3% of residents were under the age of 18 and 26.4% of residents were 65 years of age or older. For every 100 females there were 86.3 males, and for every 100 females age 18 and over there were 80.6 males age 18 and over.

0.0% of residents lived in urban areas, while 100.0% lived in rural areas.

There were 792 households in Havana, of which 24.2% had children under the age of 18 living in them. Of all households, 38.8% were married-couple households, 18.7% were households with a male householder and no spouse or partner present, and 38.8% were households with a female householder and no spouse or partner present. About 34.0% of all households were made up of individuals and 16.6% had someone living alone who was 65 years of age or older.

There were 877 housing units, of which 9.7% were vacant. The homeowner vacancy rate was 1.3% and the rental vacancy rate was 5.9%.

According to the United States Census Bureau's 2020 American Community Survey estimates, there were 708 families residing in the town.

=== 2010 census ===
As of the 2010 United States census, there were 1,754 people, 703 households, and 411 families residing in the town.

=== 2000 census ===
As of the census of 2000, there were 1,713 people, 700 households, and 471 families residing in the town. The population density was 922.5 inhabitants per square mile (356.2/km^{2}). There were 762 housing units at an average density of 410.4 per square mile (158.5/km^{2}). The racial makeup of the town was 41.86% White, 56.74% African American, 0.06% Asian, 0.82% from other races, and 0.53% from two or more races. Hispanic or Latino of any race were 1.23% of the population.

In 2000, there were 700 households, out of which 26.7% had children under the age of 18 living with them, 41.1% were married couples living together, 20.6% had a female householder with no husband present, and 32.6% were non-families. 28.1% of all households were made up of individuals, and 14.9% had someone living alone who was 65 years of age or older. The average household size was 2.43 and the average family size was 2.96.

In 2000, in the town, the population was spread out, with 22.9% under the age of 18, 8.5% from 18 to 24, 25.3% from 25 to 44, 25.2% from 45 to 64, and 18.2% who were 65 years of age or older. The median age was 40 years. For every 100 females, there were 83.2 males. For every 100 females age 18 and over, there were 79.5 males.

In 2000, the median income for a household in the town was $27,344, and the median income for a family was $38,487. Males had a median income of $25,000 versus $19,958 for females. The per capita income for the town was $18,481. About 11.1% of families and 16.3% of the population were below the poverty line, including 18.3% of those under age 18 and 23.0% of those age 65 or over.

== Education ==
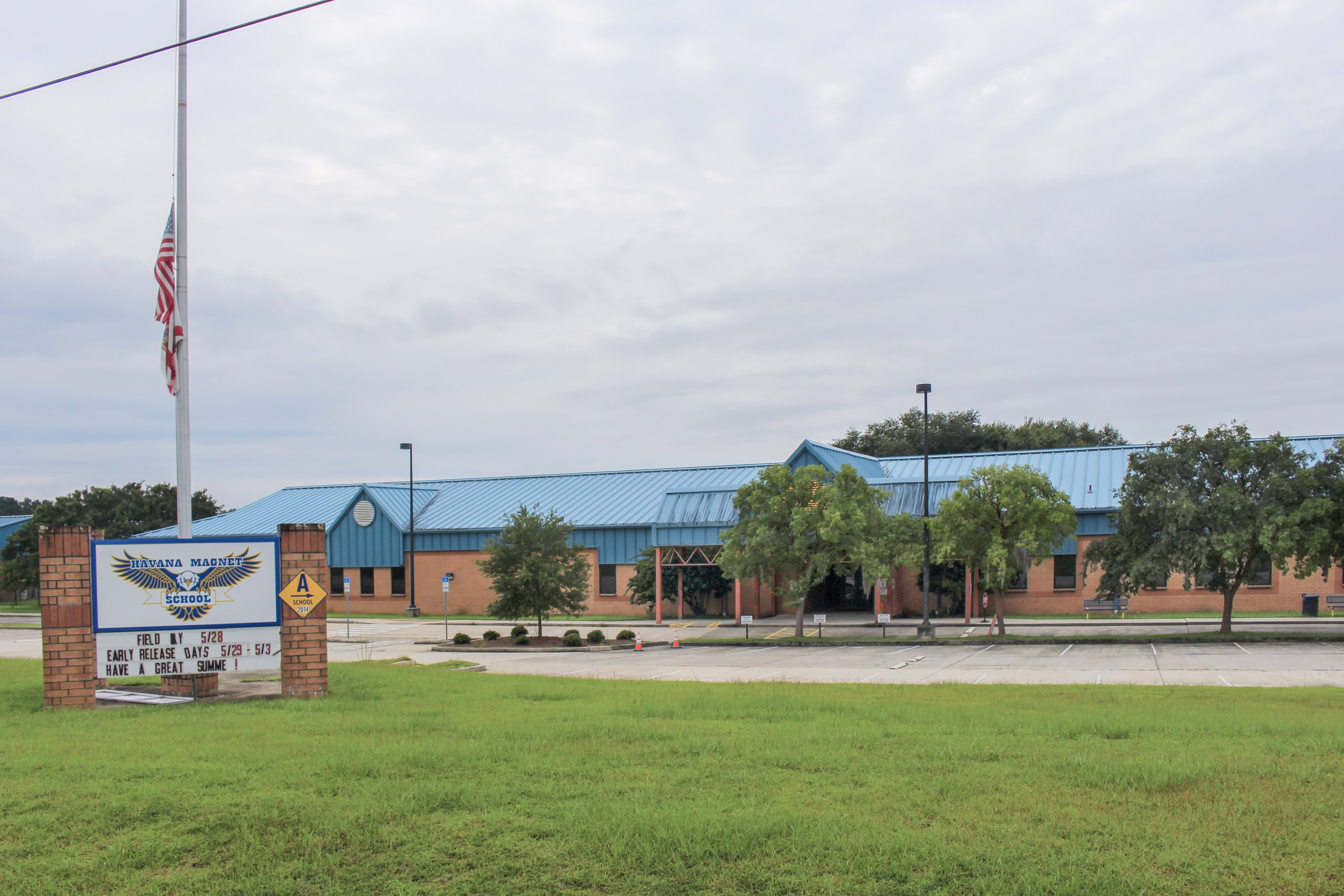
Havana Magnet School (former Havana Middle School)

The Gadsden County School District operates Havana Magnet School, which serves elementary and middle school grades. Gadsden County High School (formerly East Gadsden High School), outside of the city limits, is the only zoned high school in the county.

Previously the Havana area had three schools: Havana Elementary School, Havana Middle School, and Havana Northside High School. Havana Elementary began using the Accelerated School program in Spring 1995 in order to improve academic performance. In 2001, Havana Elementary, which occupied an 18-acre (7.3 ha) area, had about 100 employees and 1,000 students; most of the students were low income, and 95% of the students were from African-American families. In 2003, Havana Northside High School and James A. Shanks High School in Quincy consolidated into East Gadsden High. In 2017, the high school section of West Gadsden High School consolidated into East Gadsden High, leaving the latter as the only remaining zoned high school in the county.

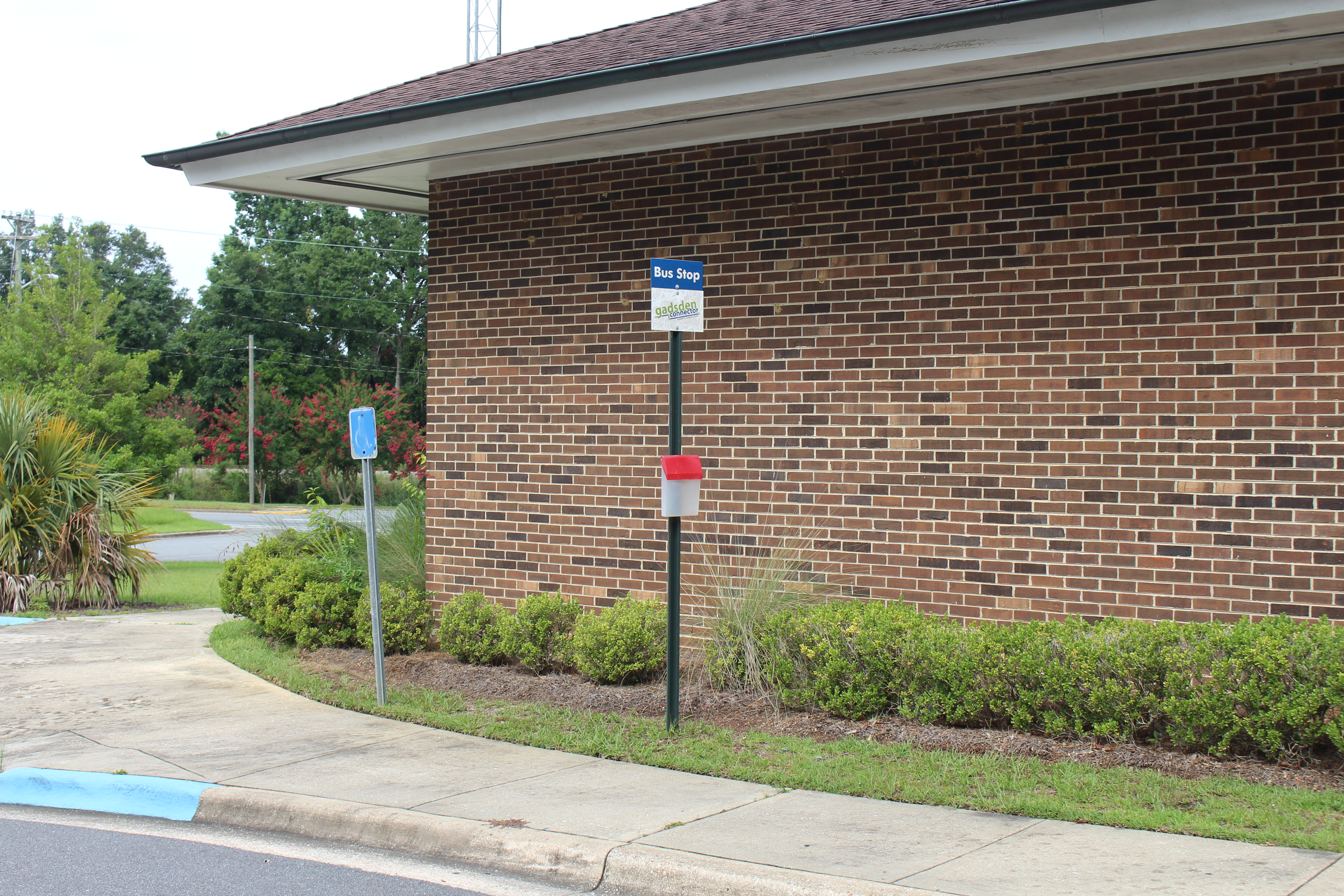
Gadsden Connector bus stop at municipal building

Two private schools are in unincorporated areas and with Havana postal addresses:

- Robert F. Munroe Day School
- Tallavanna Christian School
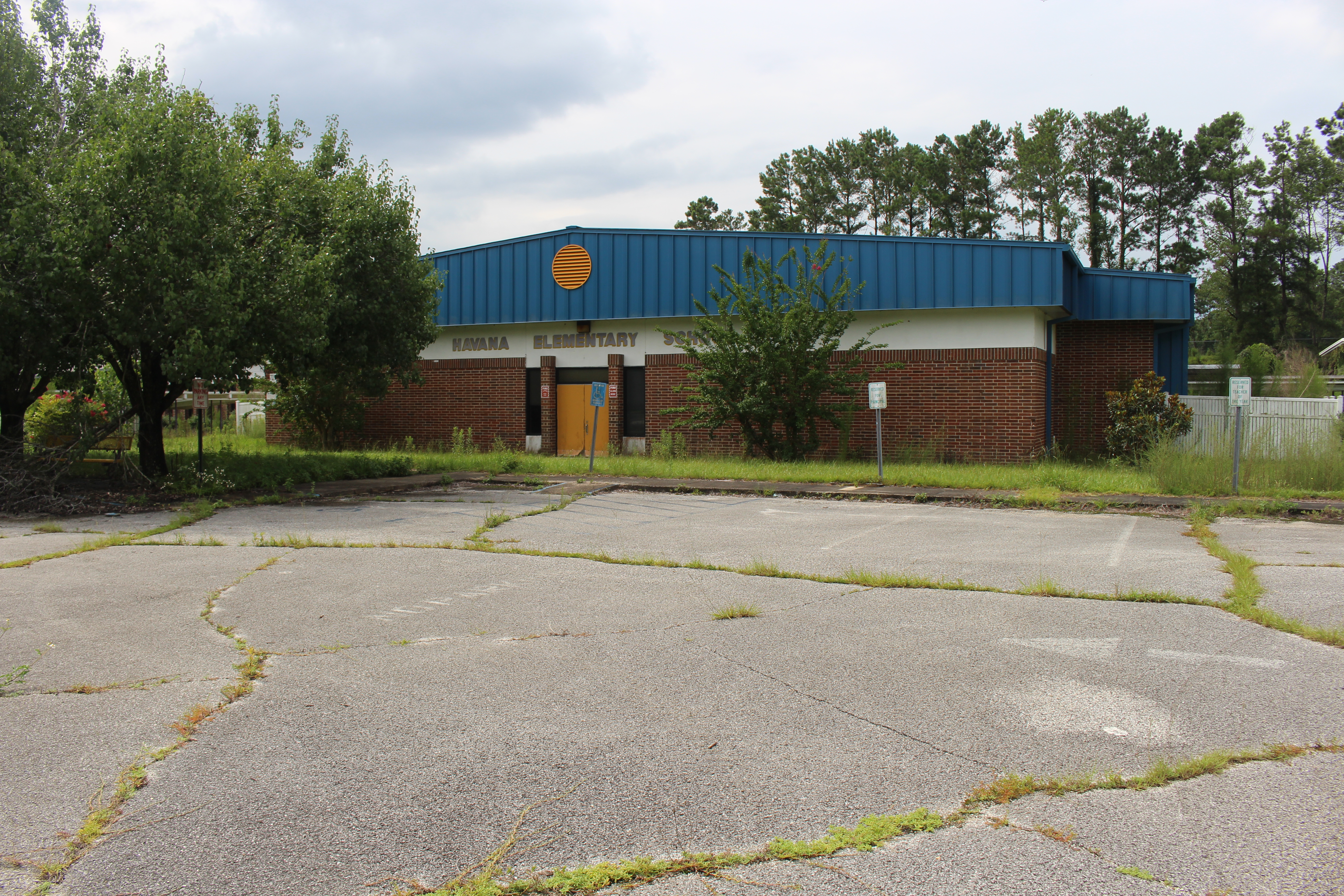
Former Havana Elementary School

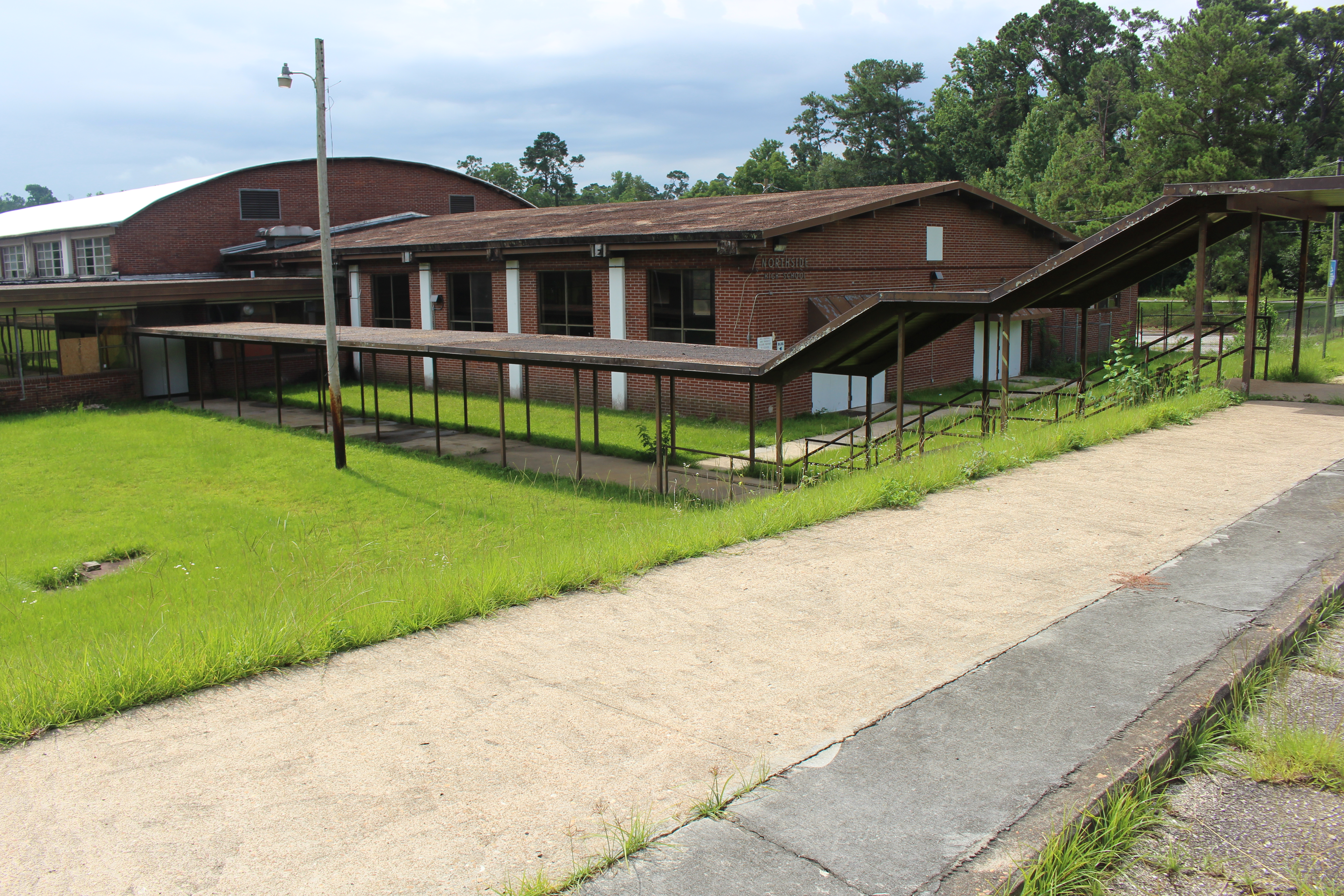
Former Havana Northside High School

== Transportation ==
The Gadsden Connector, a bus route operated by Big Bend Transit, has a stop in Havana.
