= List of awards and nominations received by Annette Bening =

Annette Bening awards and nominations
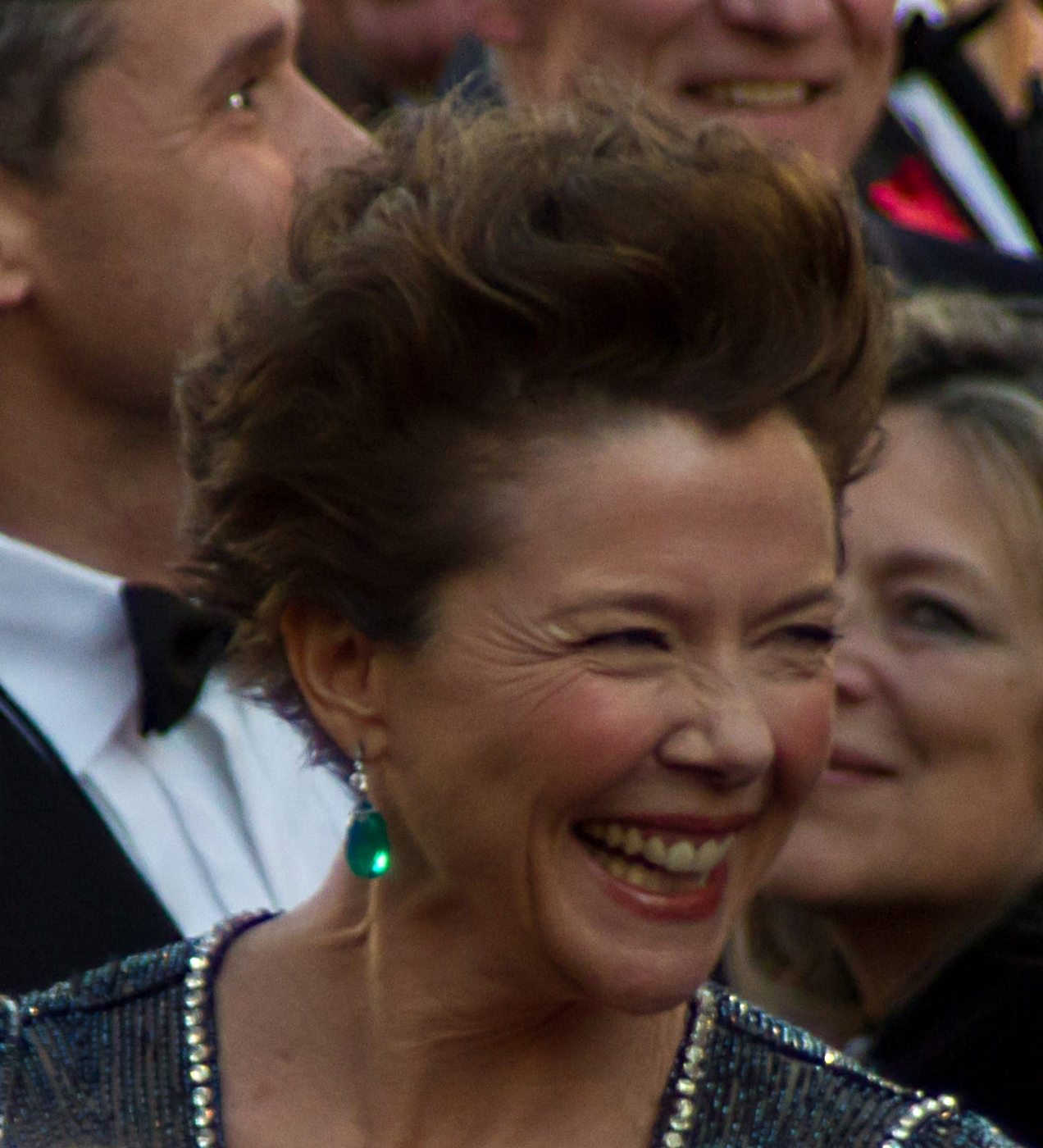
- Bening at the 83rd Academy Awards
Awards and nominations
Award	Wins	Nominations
Academy Awards	0	5
BAFTAs	1	4
Critics' Choice Awards	0	4
Emmy Awards	0	1
Golden Globe Awards	2	10
Gotham Awards	0	2
Independent Spirit Awards	0	2
Screen Actors Guild Awards	2	7
Satellite Awards	1	7
Tony Awards	0	2

Totals (Note: Certain award groups do not simply award one winner. They acknowledge several different recipients, have runners-up, and have third place. Since this is a specific recognition and is different from losing an award, runner-up mentions are considered wins in this award tally. For simplification and to avoid errors, each award in this list has been presumed to have had a prior nomination.)
- Wins: 26
- Nominations: 94

The following is a list of awards and nominations received by American actress Annette Bening.

Annette Bening is an American actress known for her roles on stage and screen. Over her distinguished career she has received numerous competitive accolades including two Golden Globe Awards, one British Academy Film Award, and two Screen Actors Guild Awards as well as nominations for five Academy Awards, a Primetime Emmy Award, and two Tony Awards.

She has received five Academy Award nominations for her roles as a con artist in the crime thriller The Grifters (1990), a suburban woman engaging in an affair in the drama American Beauty (1999), a theatre actress in the comedy-drama Being Julia (2004), an alcoholic lesbian in the independent drama The Kids Are All Right (2010), and Diana Nyad in the sports drama Nyad (2023). She won the BAFTA Award for Best Actress in a Leading Role for American Beauty and two Golden Globe Awards for Best Actress in a Musical or Comedy for Being Julia and The Kids Are All Right.

For her roles on television, she was nominated for the Primetime Emmy Award for Outstanding Lead Actress in a Limited or Anthology Series or Movie for her portrayal of a headmistress Jean Harris in the HBO television film Mrs. Harris (2006). For her performances on the Broadway stage she earned Tony Award nominations for Best Featured Actress in a Play for playing a young photographer in the Tina Howe play Coastal Disturbances (1987), and for Best Actress in a Play for her role as a mother in denial in the revival of the Arthur Miller play All My Sons (2019).

Among her various honorary accolades, Bening received a star on the Hollywood Walk of Fame and was awarded the Ibsen Centennial Commemoration Award, both in 2006. She was awarded the Gregory Peck Award for Cinematic Excellence at the San Diego International Film Festival in 2016 and received the AARP Movies for Grownups Career Achievement Award in 2019.

== Major associations ==
=== Academy Awards ===
Year	Category	Nominated work	Result	Ref.
1991	Best Supporting Actress	The Grifters	Nominated	
2000	Best Actress	American Beauty	Nominated	
2005	Best Actress	Being Julia	Nominated	
2011	Best Actress	The Kids Are All Right	Nominated	
2024	Best Actress	Nyad	Nominated	

=== BAFTA Awards ===
Year	Category	Nominated work	Result	Ref.
British Academy Film Awards
1992	Best Actress in a Supporting Role	The Grifters	Nominated	
2000	Best Actress in a Leading Role	American Beauty	Won	
2011	Best Actress in a Leading Role	The Kids Are All Right	Nominated	
2018	Best Actress in a Leading Role	Film Stars Don't Die in Liverpool	Nominated	

=== Golden Globe Awards ===
Year	Category	Nominated work	Result	Ref.
1992	Best Actress – Drama	Bugsy	Nominated	
1997	Best Actress – Comedy or Musical	The American President	Nominated	
2000	Best Actress – Drama	American Beauty	Nominated	
2005	Best Actress – Comedy or Musical	Being Julia	Won	
2007	Best Actress – Comedy or Musical	Running with Scissors	Nominated	
2007	Best Actress – Miniseries or Television Film	Mrs. Harris	Nominated	
2011	Best Actress – Comedy or Musical	The Kids Are All Right	Won	
2017	Best Actress – Comedy or Musical	20th Century Women	Nominated	
2020	Best Supporting Actress – Motion Picture	The Report	Nominated	
2024	Best Actress – Drama	Nyad	Nominated	

=== Emmy Awards ===
Year	Category	Nominated work	Result	Ref.
Primetime Emmy Awards
2006	Outstanding Lead Actress in a Limited Series or Movie	Mrs. Harris	Nominated	

=== Screen Actors Guild Awards ===
Year	Category	Nominated work	Result	Ref.
2000	Outstanding Actress in a Leading Role	American Beauty	Won	
2000	Outstanding Cast in a Motion Picture	American Beauty	Won	
2005	Outstanding Actress in a Leading Role	Being Julia	Nominated	
2007	Outstanding Actress in a Miniseries or Movie	Mrs. Harris	Nominated	
2011	Outstanding Actress in a Leading Role	The Kids Are All Right	Nominated	
2011	Outstanding Cast in a Motion Picture	The Kids Are All Right	Nominated	
2024	Outstanding Actress in a Leading Role	Nyad	Nominated	

=== Tony Awards ===
Year	Category	Nominated work	Result	Ref.
1987	Best Featured Actress in a Play	Coastal Disturbances	Nominated	
2019	Best Actress in a Play	All My Sons	Nominated	

== Miscellaneous awards ==
Organizations	Year	Category	Work	Result	Ref.
American Comedy Awards	1996	Funniest Actress in a Motion Picture	The American President	Nominated	
American Comedy Awards	2000	Funniest Actress in a Motion Picture	American Beauty	Won	
Blockbuster Entertainment Awards	1999	Favorite Actress – Suspense	The Siege	Nominated	
Blockbuster Entertainment Awards	2000	Favorite Actress – Drama	American Beauty	Nominated	
Critics' Choice Movie Awards	2004	Best Actress	Being Julia	Nominated	
Critics' Choice Movie Awards	2010	Best Actress	The Kids Are All Right	Nominated	
Critics' Choice Movie Awards	2016	Best Actress	20th Century Women	Nominated	
Critics' Choice Movie Awards	2016	Best Acting Ensemble	20th Century Women	Nominated	
Dorian Awards	2011	Film Performance of the Year	The Kids Are All Right	Won	
Golden Raspberry Awards	2009	Worst Actress (shared with Eva Mendes, Debra Messing, Jada Pinkett Smith and Meg Ryan)	The Women	Nominated	
Gotham Awards	2010	Best Ensemble Performance	The Kids Are All Right	Nominated	
Gotham Awards	2016	Best Actress	20th Century Women	Nominated	
Hollywood Film Festival	2004	Best Actress of the Year	Being Julia	Won	
Independent Spirit Awards	2010	Best Female Lead	The Kids Are All Right	Nominated	
Independent Spirit Awards	2016	Best Female Lead	20th Century Women	Nominated	
Irish Film & Television Awards	2011	Best International Actress	The Kids Are All Right	Won	
Irish Film & Television Awards	2024	Best International Actress	Nyad	Nominated	
MTV Movie Awards	1992	Best Kiss (shared with Warren Beatty)	Bugsy	Nominated	
Satellite Awards	2000	Best Actress – Motion Picture Drama	American Beauty	Nominated	
Satellite Awards	2003	Best Supporting Actress – Motion Picture	Open Range	Nominated	
Satellite Awards	2004	Best Actress – Musical or Comedy	Being Julia	Won	
Satellite Awards	2006	Best Actress – Miniseries or TV Film	Mrs. Harris	Nominated	
Satellite Awards	2006	Best Actress - Musical or Comedy	Running with Scissors	Nominated	
Satellite Awards	2010	Best Actress - Musical or Comedy	The Kids Are All Right	Nominated	
Satellite Awards	2017	Best Actress – Motion Picture	20th Century Women	Nominated	

== Critics associations ==
Organizations	Year	Category	Work	Result	Ref.
Alliance of Women Film Journalists	2010	Best Actress	The Kids Are All Right	Won	
Alliance of Women Film Journalists	2010	Women's Image Award	The Kids Are All Right	Won	
Alliance of Women Film Journalists	2010	Actress Defying Age and Ageism	The Kids Are All Right	Nominated	
Alliance of Women Film Journalists	2016	Actress Defying Age and Ageism	20th Century Women	Won	
Astra TV Awards	2024	Best Actress in a Limited Series or TV Movie	Apples Never Fall	Nominated	
Austin Film Critics Association	2016	Best Actress	20th Century Women	Nominated	
Bangkok International Film Festival	2005	Best Actress	Being Julia	Won	
Boston Society of Film Critics	2004	Best Actress	Being Julia	2nd Place	
Boston Society of Film Critics	2010	Best Actress	The Kids Are All Right	2nd Place	
Chicago Film Critics Association	1990	Most Promising Actress	Valmont	Nominated	
Chicago Film Critics Association	1992	Best Actress	Bugsy	Nominated	
Chicago Film Critics Association	1999	Best Actress	American Beauty	Nominated	
Chicago Film Critics Association	2010	Best Actress	The Kids Are All Right	Nominated	
Dallas-Fort Worth Film Critics Association Awards	1991	Best Supporting Actress	The Grifters	2nd Place	
Dallas-Fort Worth Film Critics Association Awards	2004	Best Actress	Being Julia	Nominated	
Dallas-Fort Worth Film Critics Association Awards	2010	Best Actress	The Kids Are All Right	Nominated	
Dallas-Fort Worth Film Critics Association Awards	2016	Best Actress	20th Century Women	5th Place	
Detroit Film Critics Society Awards	2016	Best Actress	20th Century Women	Nominated	
Detroit Film Critics Society Awards	2016	Best Ensemble	20th Century Women	Won	
Florida Film Critics Circle	2016	Best Actress	20th Century Women	Nominated	
Florida Film Critics Circle	2016	Best Ensemble	20th Century Women	Nominated	
Houston Film Critics Society Award	2010	Best Actress	The Kids Are All Right	Nominated	
London Film Critics Circle Awards	1992	Newcomer of the Year	Valmont / Guilty by Suspicion; The Grifters / Postcards from the Edge	Won	
London Film Critics Circle Awards	1999	Best Actress	American Beauty	Won	
London Film Critics Circle Awards	2004	Actress of the Year	Being Julia	Nominated	
London Film Critics Circle Awards	2010	Actress of the Year	The Kids Are All Right	Won	
National Society of Film Critics Awards	1990	Best Supporting Actress	The Grifters	Won	
National Society of Film Critics Awards	2011	Best Actress	The Kids Are All Right	2nd Place	
National Cowboy & Western Heritage	2004	Outstanding Theatrical Motion Picture	Open Range	Won	
National Board of Review Awards	2004	Best Actress	Being Julia	Won	
New York Film Critics Circle Award	2010	Best Actress	The Kids Are All Right	Won	
Online Film Critics Society	1999	Best Cast	American Beauty	Won	
Online Film Critics Society	1999	Best Actress	American Beauty	Nominated	
Online Film Critics Society	2010	Best Actress	The Kids Are All Right	Nominated	
San Diego Film Critics Society	1999	Best Actress	American Beauty	Won	
San Diego Film Critics Society	2016	Best Actress	20th Century Women	Nominated	
San Diego Film Critics Society	2016	Best Ensemble	20th Century Women	Nominated	
San Francisco Film Critics Circle Awards	2016	Best Actress	20th Century Women	Nominated	
Santa Barbara International Film Festival	2004	Best Actress	Being Julia	Won	
Santa Barbara International Film Festival	2010	Best Actress	The Kids Are All Right	Won	
Series Mania	2024	Best Actress Award	Apples Never Fall	Won	
St. Louis Gateway Film Critics Association	2006	Best Actress	Running with Scissors	Nominated	
Vancouver Film Critics Circle Award	2010	Best Actress	The Kids Are All Right	Nominated	
Washington D.C. Area Film Critics Association Award	2004	Best Actress	Being Julia	Nominated	
Washington D.C. Area Film Critics Association Award	2010	Best Actress	The Kids Are All Right	Nominated	
Washington D.C. Area Film Critics Association Award	2010	Best Ensemble	The Kids Are All Right	Nominated	
Washington D.C. Area Film Critics Association Award	2016	Best Actress	20th Century Women	Nominated	
Washington D.C. Area Film Critics Association Award	2016	Best Ensemble	20th Century Women	Nominated	
Women Film Critics Circle	2010	Best Comedic Actress	The Kids Are All Right	Won	
Women Film Critics Circle	2014	Women's Work/Best Ensemble	Ginger & Rosa	Nominated	
Women's Image Network Award	2014	Actress Feature Film	The Face of Love	Nominated	

== Honorary awards ==
Organizations	Year	Award	Result	Ref.
Santa Barbara International Film Festival	2005	Montecito Award	Honored	
Ibsen Centennial Commemoration Award.	2006	Statue	Honored	
Hollywood Walk of Fame	2006	Inducted	Honored	
Santa Barbara International Film Festival	2011	American Riviera Award	Honored	
Elle Women in Hollywood Awards	2014	Lifetime Achievement Award	Honored	
San Diego International Film Festival	2016	Gregory Peck Award for Cinematic Excellence	Honored	
AARP Movies for Grownups Awards	2019	Career Achievement Award	Honored	
Santa Barbara International Film Festival	2024	Arlington Award	Honored	
Hasty Pudding Theatricals'	2024	Hasty Pudding Woman of the Year	Honored	
Costume Designers Guild	2024	Spotlight Award	Honored	

== See also ==
- List of Annette Bening performances
