= Fanny Quincy Howe =

American essayist 1870–1933

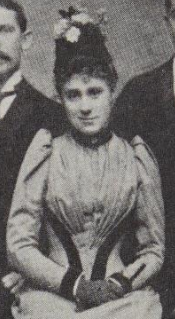
- Born: April 14, 1870; Quincy
- Died: April 17, 1933 (aged 63)
- Spouse(s): Mark Antony De Wolfe Howe
- Children: Mark De Wolfe Howe, Quincy Howe, Helen Howe
- Parent(s): Josiah Phillips Quincy; Helen Frances Quincy
- Relatives: Josiah Quincy

Frances "Fanny" Huntington Quincy Howe (April 14, 1870 – April 17, 1933) was an American essayist and novelist.

Fanny Huntington Quincy was born on April 14, 1870 in Quincy, Massachusetts, the daughter of Josiah Quincy and Helen Francis Huntington Quincy. Her brother Josiah Quincy would serve as mayor of Boston. In 1899 she married the writer Mark Antony DeWolfe Howe. They had three children: legal historian Mark De Wolfe Howe, journalist Quincy Howe, and poet and novelist Helen Howe.

Howe published a single novel, the anonymously published Boston society novel The Opal. Howe published a number of essays and stories in the Atlantic Monthly, Scribner’s, and New England Magazine under pseudonyms including Wilmot Price, Catherine Russell, and Grundy Frances. Her pieces for the Atlantic's "Contributor’s Club” column were reprinted in the book The Notion-Counter: A Farrago of Foibles, Being Notes About Nothing (1922).

From 1910 to 1922, Howe corresponded with Maimie Pinzer, a former prostitute. Howe's letters to Pinzer were lost, but Pinzer's letters to Howe are preserved in the Schlesinger Library. They were published as The Maimie Papers in 1977.
