= List of awards and nominations received by Dianne Wiest =

Dianne Wiest awards and nominations
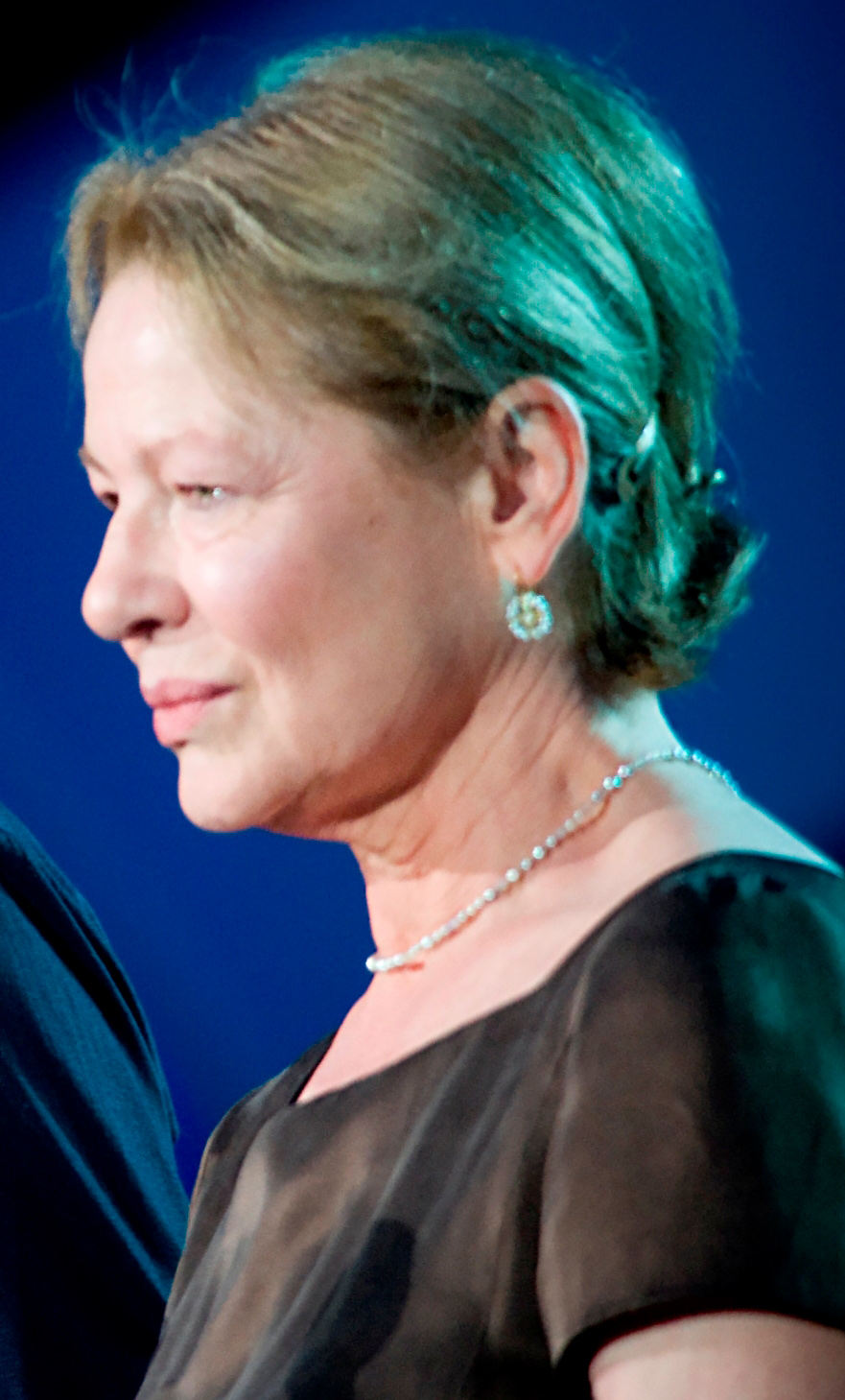
- Wiest in 2009
Award	Wins	Nominations
Totals
Academy Awards	2	3
Golden Globe Awards	1	4
BAFTA Awards	0	1
Primetime Emmy Awards	2	4
20/20 Awards	0	1
American Comedy Awards	2	5
Awards Circuit Community Awards	1	2
Academy of Science Fiction, Fantasy & Horror Films	0	1
Blockbuster Entertainment Awards	1	2
CableACE Awards	0	1
Chlotrudis Awards	1	2
Film Independent Spirit Awards	2	2
Gotham Awards	1	1
Gracie Allen Awards	1	1
National Board of Review Awards	1	1
New York Women in Film & Television	1	1
Online Film & Television Association	0	2
Satellite Awards	1	3
Screen Actors Guild Awards	2	5
Sundance Film Festival	2	2
Women's Image Network Awards	1	1
Boston Society of Film Critics	1	2
Chicago Film Critics Association	1	2
Dallas-Fort Worth Film Critics Association	1	1
Kansas City Film Critics Circle Awards	1	1
Los Angeles Film Critics Association	2	3
National Society of Film Critics	2	3
New York Film Critics Circle	2	3
Society of Texas Film Critics	1	1
Southeastern Film Critics Association	1	1
Wins	34
Nominations	66

Dianne Wiest (born March 28, 1948) is an American actress. Over the course of her career, she has earned her two Academy Award, a Golden Globe, two Primetime Emmy Award, two Screen Actors Guild Awards as well as a nomination for a BAFTA Award.

Wiest won two Academy Awards for Best Supporting Actress for her roles in the Woody Allen's comedy-drama Hannah and Her Sisters (1986) and his crime comedy Bullets Over Broadway (1994). For the later she also won the Golden Globe Award for Best Supporting Actress – Motion Picture and the Screen Actors Guild Award for Outstanding Performance by a Female Actor in a Supporting Role. She was nominated for the BAFTA Award for Best Actress in a Supporting Role for Allen's comedy-drama Radio Days (1987).

For her roles on television, she won the Primetime Emmy Award for Outstanding Guest Actress in a Drama Series for the CBS series Road to Avonlea (1996) and the Primetime Emmy Award for Outstanding Supporting Actress in a Drama Series for playing a psychotherapist in the HBO drama series In Treatment (2008–2009). She was Emmy-nominated for her role in The Simple Life of Noah Dearborn (1999).

== Major Associations ==
=== Academy Awards ===
Year	Category	Nominated work	Result	Ref.
1987	Best Supporting Actress	Hannah and Her Sisters	Won	
1990	Best Supporting Actress	Parenthood	Nominated	
1995	Best Supporting Actress	Bullets Over Broadway	Won	

=== BAFTA Awards ===
Year	Category	Nominated work	Result	Ref.
British Academy Film Awards
1988	Best Actress in a Supporting Role	Radio Days	Nominated	

=== Emmy Awards ===
Year	Category	Nominated work	Result	Ref.
Primetime Emmy Awards
1997	Outstanding Guest Actress in a Drama Series	Road to Avonlea (ep: "Woman of Importance")	Won	
1999	Outstanding Supporting Actress in a Limited Series or Movie	The Simple Life of Noah Dearborn	Nominated	
2008	Outstanding Supporting Actress in a Drama Series	In Treatment (episode: "Week 6: Paul and Gina")	Won	
2009	Outstanding Supporting Actress in a Drama Series	In Treatment (episode: "Week 6: Gina")	Nominated	

=== Golden Globe Awards ===
Year	Category	Nominated work	Result	Ref.
1987	Best Supporting Actress – Motion Picture	Hannah and Her Sisters	Nominated	
1990	Best Supporting Actress – Motion Picture	Parenthood	Nominated	
1995	Best Supporting Actress – Motion Picture	Bullets Over Broadway	Won	
2009	Best Supporting Actress – Television	In Treatment	Nominated	

=== Screen Actors Guild Awards ===
Year	Category	Nominated work	Result	Ref.
1995	Outstanding Supporting Actress in a Motion Picture	Bullets Over Broadway	Won	
1997	Outstanding Ensemble in a Motion Picture (Note: Shared with Robin Williams, Gene Hackman, Nathan Lane, Hank Azaria, Christine Baranski, and Dan Futterman)	The Birdcage	Won	
2001	Outstanding Ensemble in a Drama Series (Note: Shared with Angie Harmon, Steven Hill, Jesse L. Martin, S. Epatha Merkerson, Jerry Orbach, and Sam Waterston)	Law & Order	Nominated	
2002	Outstanding Ensemble in a Drama Series	Law & Order	Nominated	
2026	Outstanding Performance by an Ensemble in a Comedy Series	Only Murders in the Building	Nominated	

== Critic Awards ==
Year	Association	Category	Nominated work	Result	Ref.
1986	Boston Society of Film Critics	Best Supporting Actress	Hannah and Her Sisters	Won	
1998	Boston Society of Film Critics	Best Supporting Actress	Bullets Over Broadway	Nominated	
1990	Chicago Film Critics Association	Best Supporting Actress	Edward Scissorhands	Nominated	
1994	Chicago Film Critics Association	Best Supporting Actress	Bullets Over Broadway	Won	
1994	Dallas-Fort Worth Film Critics Association	Best Supporting Actress	Bullets Over Broadway	Won	
1994	Kansas City Film Critics Circle	Best Supporting Actress	Bullets Over Broadway	Won	
1986	Los Angeles Film Critics Association	Best Supporting Actress (Note: Tied with Cathy Tyson for Mona Lisa (1986))	Hannah and Her Sisters	Won	
1990	Los Angeles Film Critics Association	Best Supporting Actress	Edward Scissorhands	Nominated	
1994	Los Angeles Film Critics Association	Best Supporting Actress	Bullets Over Broadway	Won	
1986	National Society of Film Critics	Best Supporting Actress	Hannah and Her Sisters	Won	
1990	National Society of Film Critics	Best Supporting Actress	Edward Scissorhands	Nominated	
1994	National Society of Film Critics	Best Supporting Actress	Bullets Over Broadway	Won	
1983	New York Film Critics Circle	Best Supporting Actress	Independence Day	Nominated	
1986	New York Film Critics Circle	Best Supporting Actress	Hannah and Her Sisters	Won	
1994	New York Film Critics Circle	Best Supporting Actress	Bullets Over Broadway	Won	
1994	Society of Texas Film Critics	Best Supporting Actress	Bullets Over Broadway	Won	
1994	Southeastern Film Critics Association	Best Supporting Actress	Bullets Over Broadway	Won	

== Miscellaneous awards ==
Year	Association	Category	Nominated work	Result	Ref.
1989	20/20 Awards	Felix Award for Best Supporting Actress	Parenthood	Nominated	
1986	American Comedy Awards	Funniest Leading Actress in a Motion Picture	Hannah and Her Sisters	Nominated	
1989	American Comedy Awards	Funniest Supporting Actress in a Motion Picture	Parenthood	Nominated	
1994	American Comedy Awards	Funniest Supporting Actress in a Motion Picture	Bullets Over Broadway	Won	
1996	American Comedy Awards	Funniest Supporting Actress in a Motion Picture	The Birdcage	Won	
1998	American Comedy Awards	Funniest Supporting Actress in a Motion Picture	Practical Magic	Nominated	
1994	Awards Circuit Community Awards	Bullets Over Broadway	Best Cast Ensemble (Note: Shared with John Cusack, Jennifer Tilly, Chazz Palminteri, Mary-Louise Parker, Jack Warden, Joe Viterelli, Rob Reiner, Tracey Ullman, Jim Broadbent, and Harvey Fierstein)	Nominated	
1994	Awards Circuit Community Awards	Bullets Over Broadway	Best Actress in a Supporting Role	Won	
1996	Blockbuster Entertainment Awards	Favorite Supporting Actress – Comedy	The Birdcage	Won	
1998	Blockbuster Entertainment Awards	Favourite Supporting Actress – Comedy/Romance	Practical Magic	Nominated	
1990	CableACE Awards	Guest Actress in a Dramatic Special or Series	Road to Avonlea	Nominated	
1994	Chlotrudis Awards	Best Supporting Actress	Bullets Over Broadway	Won	
2010	Chlotrudis Awards	Best Supporting Actress	Rabbit Hole	Nominated	
2008	Gracie Allen Awards	Outstanding Supporting Actress - Drama Series	In Treatment	Won	
2008	Gotham Awards	Best Ensemble Cast (Note: Shared with Hope Davis, Philip Seymour Hoffman, Jennifer Jason Leigh, Catherine Keener, Samantha Morton, Tom Noonan, Emily Watson, and Michelle Williams – tied with Vicky Cristina Barcelona (2008))	Synecdoche, New York	Won	
1994	Independent Spirit Awards	Best Supporting Female	Bullets Over Broadway	Won	
2008	Independent Spirit Awards	Independent Spirit Robert Altman Award (Note: Shared with Charlie Kaufman, Jeanne McCarthy, Hope Davis, Philip Seymour Hoffman, Jennifer Jason Leigh, Catherine Keener, Samantha Morton, Tom Noonan, Emily Watson, and Michelle Williams)	Synecdoche, New York	Won	
1986	National Board of Review	Best Supporting Actress	Hannah and Her Sisters	Won	
1997	New York Women in Film & Television	Muse Award	Achievement in film & television	Won	
2004	Online Film & Television Association	Best Actress in a Motion Picture or Miniseries	The Blackwater Lightship	Nominated	
2013	Online Film & Television Association	Best Guest Actress in a Drama Series	The Blacklist	Nominated	
2004	Satellite Awards	Best Actress – Miniseries or Television Film	The Blackwater Lightship	Won	
2008	Satellite Awards	Best Supporting Actress – Television	In Treatment	Nominated	
2010	Satellite Awards	Best Supporting Actress – Motion Picture	Rabbit Hole	Nominated	
1990	Saturn Awards	Best Supporting Actress	Edward Scissorhands	Nominated	
1996	Sundance Film Festival	Tribute to Independent Vision	Achievement in film & television	Won	
2006	Sundance Film Festival	Best Ensemble Performance (Note: Shared with Robert Downey Jr., Shia LaBeouf, Rosario Dawson, Chazz Palminteri, and Channing Tatum)	A Guide to Recognizing Your Saints	Won	
2008	Women's Image Network Awards	Outstanding Actress Drama Series	In Treatment	Won	

== Theater awards ==
Year	Association	Category	Nominated work	Result	Ref.
1980	Drama Desk Awards	Outstanding Featured Actress in a Play	The Art of Dining	Nominated	
1984	Drama Desk Awards	Outstanding Featured Actress in a Play	Other Places / Serenading Louie	Nominated	
1987	Drama Desk Awards	Outstanding Actress in a Play	Hunting Cockroaches	Nominated	
1980	Theatre World Awards	Outstanding Debut Performance	The Art of Dining	Won	
1980	Obie Awards	Distinguished Performance by an Actress	The Art of Dining	Won	
1984	Obie Awards	Distinguished Performance by an Actress	Other Places / Serenading Louie	Won	
2024	Obie Awards	Distinguished Performance by an Actress	Scene Partners	Won	
