= List of Annette Bening performances =

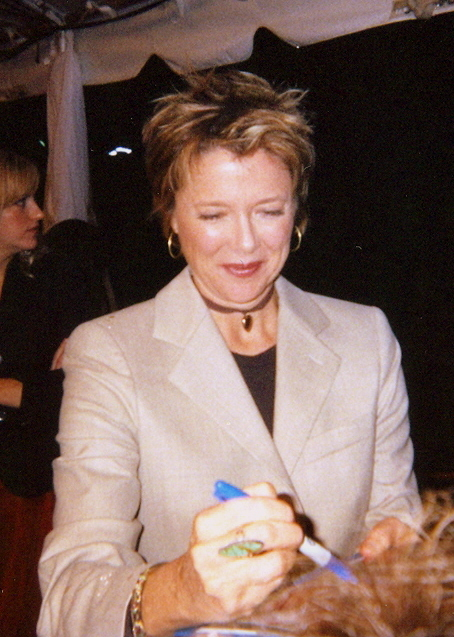
Bening at the Toronto Film Festival, 2005

The following is the list of performances given by an American actress Annette Bening.

== Filmography ==
Key
†	Denotes films that have not yet been released

=== Film ===
Year	Title	Role	Notes	Ref.
1988	The Great Outdoors	Kate Craig		
1989	Valmont	Marquise de Merteuil		
1990	The Grifters	Myra Langtry		
1990	Postcards from the Edge	Evelyn Ames		
1991	Guilty by Suspicion	Ruth Merrill		
1991	Regarding Henry	Sarah Turner		
1991	Bugsy	Virginia Hill		
1994	Love Affair	Terry McKay		
1995	Richard III	Queen Elizabeth		
1995	The American President	Sydney Ellen Wade		
1996	Mars Attacks!	Barbara Land		
1998	The Siege	Elise Kraft / Sharon Bridger		
1999	In Dreams	Claire Cooper		
1999	American Beauty	Carolyn Burnham		
2000	What Planet Are You From?	Susan Anderson		
2003	Open Range	Sue Barlow		
2004	Being Julia	Julia Lambert		
2006	Running with Scissors	Deirdre Burroughs		
2008	The Women	Sylvie Fowler		
2009	Mother and Child	Karen		
2010	The Kids Are All Right	Dr. Nicole Allgood		
2012	Ruby Sparks	Gertrude Weir-Fields		
2012	Ginger & Rosa	May Bella		
2012	Girl Most Likely	Zelda Duncan		
2013	The Face of Love	Nikki Lostrom		
2014	The Search	Helen		
2015	Danny Collins	Mary Sinclair		
2016	20th Century Women	Dorothea Fields		
2016	Rules Don't Apply	Lucy Mabrey		
2017	Film Stars Don't Die in Liverpool	Gloria Grahame		
2018	The Seagull	Irina Arkadina		
2018	Life Itself	Dr. Cait Morris		
2019	The Report	Senator Dianne Feinstein		
2019	Captain Marvel	Supreme Intelligence / Dr. Wendy Lawson		
2019	Georgetown	Amanda Brecht		
2019	Hope Gap	Grace		
2022	Death on the Nile	Euphemia Bouc		
2022	Jerry & Marge Go Large	Marge Selbee		
2023	Nyad	Diana Nyad		
2023	Poolman	Diane Esplinade		
2026	The Bride!	Dr. Cornelia Euphronious		
2027	42.6 Years	Ruthie	Post-production	
TBA	In Love		Filming	

=== Television ===
Year	Title	Role	Notes	Ref.
1986	Manhunt for Claude Dallas	Ann Tillman	TV movie	
1987	Miami Vice	Vicky	Episode: "Red Tape"	
1987	Wiseguy	Karen Leland	Episode: "One on One"	
2002–2003	Liberty's Kids	Abigail Adams	Voice role; 5 episodes	
2004	The Sopranos	Herself	Episode: "The Test Dream"	
2005	Mrs. Harris	Jean Harris	TV movie	
2006	Saturday Night Live	Herself/Host	Episode: "Annette Bening/Gwen Stefani and Akon"	
2024	Apples Never Fall	Joy Delaney	Miniseries; also executive producer	
2026	Dutton Ranch	Beulah Jackson	Main role	
2026	Lucky	Priscilla Masterson	Miniseries	

== Stage ==
Year	Title	Role	Theatre	Ref.
1986	Coastal Disturbances	Holly Dancer	McGinn-Cazale Theatre	
1987–1988	Coastal Disturbances	Holly Dancer	Circle in the Square Theatre	
1988	Spoils of War	Kate	McGinn-Cazale Theatre	
1999	Hedda Gabler	Hedda Gabler Tesman	Geffen Playhouse	
2014	Ruth Draper's Monologues	Various characters	Geffen Playhouse	
2014	King Lear	Goneril	Delacorte Theater	
2019	All My Sons	Kate Keller	American Airlines Theatre	

== See also ==
- List of awards and nominations received by Annette Bening
