= Tina Howe =

American playwright (1937–2023)

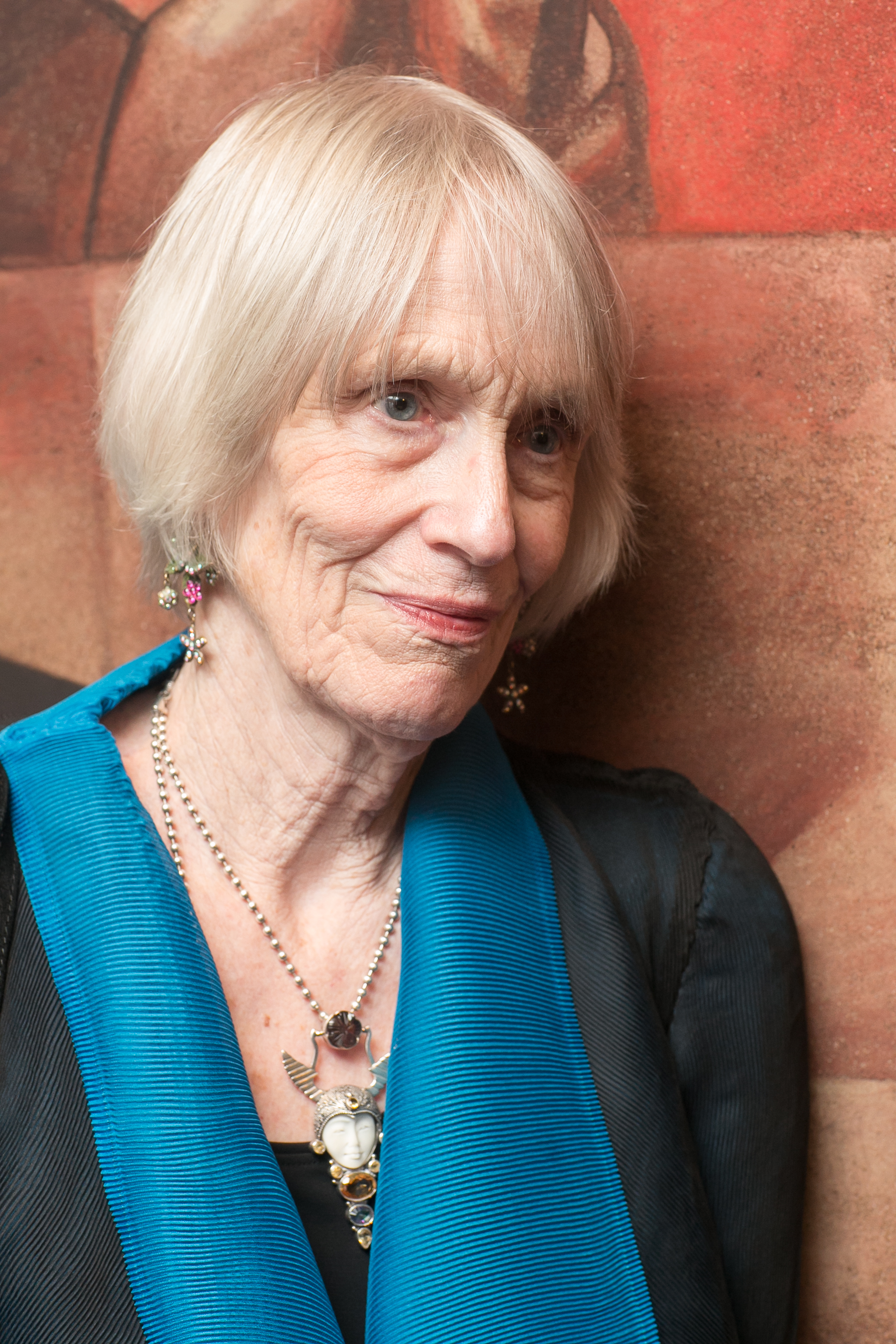
- Howe in 2015
- Born: Mabel Davis Howe; November 21, 1937; New York City, U.S.
- Died: August 28, 2023 (aged 85); New York City, U.S.
- Education: Sarah Lawrence College (BA); Sorbonne University; Columbia University; Chicago State University
- Occupation: Playwright
- Spouse: Norman Levy (m. 1961; died 2022)
- Children: 2
- Parent: Quincy Howe (father)
- Relatives: Mark Antony De Wolfe Howe (grandfather)
- Writing career
- Period: 1959–2017

Mabel Davis "Tina" Howe (November 21, 1937 – August 28, 2023) was an American playwright. In a career that spanned more than four decades, Howe's best-known works include Museum, The Art of Dining, Painting Churches, Coastal Disturbances, and Pride's Crossing.

Her plays won numerous awards, including the 1998 New York Drama Critics Circle Award for Best Play for Pride's Crossing, which was also a finalist for the 1997 Pulitzer Prize for Drama. Coastal Disturbances was nominated for the 1987 Tony Award for Best Play.

== Early life ==
Mabel Davis Howe was born in Manhattan on November 21, 1937. Howe came from a literary family. Her grandfather, Mark Antony De Wolfe Howe, published over 50 books and won the Pulitzer Prize for Biography in 1925. Her father Quincy Howe wrote and broadcast the evening news on CBS Radio from 1942 to 1947, and then on ABC television. He was the author of the three-volume history, A World History of Our Own Times. Her uncle, Mark DeWolfe Howe, taught constitutional law at Harvard Law School and was Oliver Wendell Holmes Jr.'s law clerk and biographer. Her aunt, Helen Howe, was a successful monologist and novelist. Howe was called Tina since her childhood, so when she was eighteen, she changed her name from Mabel Howe to Tina Howe.

Howe's family placed an emphasis on its members' reading and writing: "Thanksgivings and family occasions were always about, 'What are you reading, what are you writing, what are you working on, what poetry are you interested in?'" When Howe was ill with hepatitis, her father visited her every day in the hospital, reading James Joyce's Ulysses to her during his lunch break.

Howe graduated from Sarah Lawrence College in Bronxville, New York, in 1959. As an undergraduate, she wrote her first play, Closing Time; her classmate, Jane Alexander, later directed and acted in it.

After graduation, she and Alexander traveled to Europe; Alexander to act and study mathematics at the University of Edinburgh and Howe to study philosophy at Sorbonne University and write. When Howe saw Eugène Ionesco's La Cantatrice Chauve at the Théâtre de la Huchette, "It changed my life", she said. "It was like a bolt of lightning going through my head."

Following her return from Europe, Howe did graduate work at Columbia University Teacher's College and Chicago Teachers College. She started teaching high school in Monona Grove, Wisconsin, while her husband (teacher and writer Norman Levy) was doing graduate work and then in Bath, Maine, which is where she said she learned her craft through running the school's drama department, a position she agreed to take if they would produce her plays.

== Career ==
=== Themes and style ===
Literary critic and novelist C. W. E. Bigsby wrote that "art is plainly a central point of reference" for Howe, noting those themes in Painting Churches and Coastal Disturbances, and added that "food and consumption" are also important themes in her work. In his book Contemporary American Playwrights, Bigsby wrote that she had a "commitment to experimentation" and quotes Howe as saying said that she is "firmly entrenched in the Absurdist tradition." Frank Rich, in his New York Times review of Painting Churches commented that the play "is in the dreamiest impressionistic spirit." The Variety reviewer of Painting Churches also noted that the play is a "group portrait painted in a soft, impressionistic style."

The CurtainUp reviewer of Coastal Disturbances wrote of Howe's work: "Like all of Howe's work, the play's charm stems from its quirky characters. In this case joie de vie, despair, love, lust, anger and fear come and go like the waves hitting the shore in foamy bursts or gentle ripples." Writing in the Sarah Lawrence Magazine, Celia McGerr Regan described Howe's authorial voice: "Howe developed a voice that has been variously described as farcical and absurd, impressionistic and airy, graceful and perceptive, lyric and literate, vivid and language-driven, whimsical and demented. Odd things happen in the face of the recognizable: Trees grow up inside and through a New York State farmhouse (One Shoe Off)..."

Ben Brantley in reviewing Birth and After Birth for The New York Times, observed "The suggestion is of a natural world that thwarts and ultimately devours the ambitions and pretensions of the civilized. This is a theme that Ms. Howe would develop in later works, sometimes artfully (Coastal Disturbances), sometimes clumsily (One Shoe Off), but always in a style that was distinctively her own."

Howe noted about her time in Paris: "The most profound thing that happened to me that year ... was seeing The Bald Soprano by Ionesco. That exploded me all over the place." Ionesco, Beckett and Pirandello continued to be her heroes.

Howe was a great admirer of Glenn Gould, saying, "I write my plays to Glenn Gould. I cook the kids' spaghetti dinners to Glenn Gould. I pay the bills to Glenn Gould."

=== Full-length plays ===
Howe's first full-length play to receive a professional production was The Nest, which premiered in summer 1969 at the Act IV Theater in Provincetown, Massachusetts. It was directed by Larry Arrick and the cast included Sally Kirkland and Richard Jordan among others. From Provincetown, the show was transferred Off-Broadway to New York's Mercury Theater, opening on April 9, 1970.

Howe later recalled, "My first play, 'The Nest,' was about courtship and how women compete with each other to land a husband. That play closed [off-Broadway] in one night." The play follows the trials of three young women competing for husbands at a dinner party, and during the course of the play, one of the women takes off her clothes and dives into a huge wedding cake, and is licked clean by one of the male guests. The Nest, Clive Barnes of The New York Times wrote in his review, "must be on any reasonable short list of the worst plays I have ever seen."

Her play Museum, with a cast of 55 characters, premiered at the Los Angeles Actors' Theatre on April 29, 1976, and was then presented Off-Broadway by Joseph Papp at the Public Theater, opening in February 1978, in a production directed by Max Stafford-Clark. A cast of 18 actors played a total of 44 characters. The play takes place at a group art show of three contemporary artists, titled The Broken Silence. The Public Theater production featured Dianne Wiest, Kathryn Grody and Larry Bryggman. A CurtainUp reviewer noted that Howe "explained in her author's note for the play's premiere at the Shakespeare Festival, her large cast of characters was created to provide directors and producers with endless staging possibilities." In her note in the script (published by Samuel French), Howe wrote: "It is my hope that any group wanting to present Museum use the large cast size as a challenge and not as a restriction. The play was written to serve the versatility of actors."

The play was revived Off-Broadway by the Keen Company in 2002, directed by Carl Forsman. In his Village Voice review, Michael Feingold wrote, "This is the most enchantingly tesserated play ever written … . If Mozart had been a TV producer, this is what a 'Candid Camera' segment on art might have looked like."

The Art of Dining is set in an exclusive restaurant (and home) moving from the kitchen of the chef/owner, to the dining room, where her husband is the maitre d', to the individual tables of the characters, observing their action and interplay while waiting for and eating their meals. The play was first presented Off-Broadway by Joseph Papp at the Public Theater in December 1979, in a production directed by A. J. Antoon with a cast featuring Kathy Bates, Ron Rifkin and Dianne Wiest, who went on to win the 1980 Clarence Derwent Award and Obie Award.

Howe herself won an Obie Award in 1983 for distinguished playwriting for her plays The Art of Dining, Museum and Painting Churches. From New York, The Art of Dining moved to a run at the Kennedy Center.

Howe's next play, Painting Churches, premiered on February 8, 1983, at Second Stage Theater, under the direction of Carole Rothman. The cast included Marian Seldes, Frances Conroy and Donald Moffat. It transferred to the off-Broadway Lambs Theater where it ran from November 22, 1983, through May 20, 1984, playing 206 performances. In this production Marian Seldes was joined by Elizabeth McGovern and George Martin. Painting Churches won several Outer Critics Circle Awards, including Best Off-Broadway Play, Best Actress (Marian Seldes) and the John Gassner Playwriting Award. The play was also a finalist for the Pulitzer Prize in Drama.

In 1986, Painting Churches was filmed for PBS's American Playhouse, directed by Jack O'Brien. That cast included Sada Thompson, Donald Moffat and Roxanne Hart. It was revived off-Broadway by the Keen Company in March 2012, directed by Carl Forsman, starring Kathleen Chalfant, John Cunningham, and Kate Turnbull.

In November 1986, Howe's next play, Coastal Disturbances premiered at Second Stage, under the direction of Carole Rothman. The play was set on a private New England beach. Annette Bening and Tim Daly led the cast. The play was transferred to the Circle-in-the-Square Theater on Broadway in March 1987. It was nominated for a Tony award for Best Play along with Carole Rothman for Best Direction and Annette Bening for Best Actress. Frank Rich of The New York Times hailed it as "Hilarious", "erotic" and "intoxicating".

This was followed by Approaching Zanzibar, which shows the Blossom family traveling across the United States to visit Olivia, a sick relative. The play premiered at the Second Stage Theatre on April 8, 1989, directed by Carole Rothman, and starred Jane Alexander as Charlotte Blossom, Harris Yulin as her husband, Angela Goethals as her daughter and Bethel Leslie as her dying aunt. The play was produced at the Southwark Playhouse, London, in August 1997. The reviewer for The Independent wrote: "... a zany, expertly mimed sequence throws the tensions of cooped-up family car travel into rollicking relief when, in fantasy, the parents and children swap roles. But, like so much off-Broadway fare, the play insists on coating the pill of pain in the sickly sugar of false reassurance."

One Shoe Off opened Off-Broadway in April 1993 in a Second Stage Theatre production at the Public Theater. The Variety reviewer described the play as "the dining-room play that dissolves in an emotive crossfire of accusation, revelation and reconciliation", "offbeat, sometimes ferociously funny" with an "over-the-top tone".

Her play Pride's Crossing, described by Playbill as a "family-inspired memory play" was produced Off-Broadway at Lincoln Center from December 7, 1997, to April 5, 1998 after an engagement at the Old Globe Theatre (San Diego) in 1997. The play was revived Off-Broadway in 2004. She received the New York Drama Critic's Circle Award for Best Play in 1998 for this play.

Rembrandt's Gift premiered at the Humana Festival at Actors Theatre of Louisville in 2002, directed by John Rando and starring Penny Fuller and a revised version was produced by the Madison Repertory Theatre (Wisconsin) in September 2005. The three person play focuses on an "unlikely, poignant and very funny visit by the great 17th-century Dutch painter Rembrandt van Rijn.

Howe wrote English translations of Eugène Ionesco's The Bald Soprano and The Lesson, which were produced at the Atlantic Theater Company in September 2004. The plays were directed by Carl Forsman and featured Jan Maxwell, John Ellison Conlee, Michael Countryman and Robert Stanton.

The Atlantic Theater Company presented Birth and After Birth Off-Broadway at the Linda Gross Theater, opening in September 2006 in previews. Described by Playbill as "a play about parenting", the play was written in 1972; it was directed by Atlantic associate artistic director Christian Parker. The play was first presented at the Wilma Theatre (Philadelphia, Pennsylvania) in September 1995, after being rewritten and having readings, and a workshop at the California State University Summer Arts Festival. The reviewer of this production wrote: "The play bears the mark of a youthful playwright. Howe's brilliant mind is teeming with enough ideas to fill several plays, and her themes and style at times suggest an early fascination with older playwrights such as Ionesco and Albee." Birth and After Birth is "a comedy... in which a self-centered, tantrum-throwing monster of a 4-year-old is played by a fully grown adult male."

Chasing Manet opened Off-Broadway at Primary Stages in April 2009, starring Jane Alexander and Lynn Cohen. The play takes place in a nursing home, with the "rebellious painter" and a Jewish woman becoming friends and planning on escaping to go to Paris aboard the QE2. Jane Alexander was a friend of Howe's from Sarah Lawrence College.

Howe provided the text for the interdisciplinary work Cheri, conceived, directed and choreographed by Martha Clarke, which opened Off-Broadway in a Signature Theatre Company production at the Pershing Square Signature Center-Irene Diamond Stage on November 19, 2013, in previews.

Her full-length play Singing Beach premiered Off-Broadway at HERE Arts Center on July 22, 2017, in previews in a limited engagement, produced by Theatre 167. Directed by Ari Laura Kreith, the cast featured Erin Beirnard, Devin Haqq, Jackson Demott Hill, John P. Keller, Tuck Milligan, Elodie Morss, and Naren Weiss. The play involves the effects that a Category 4 hurricane has on the Sleeper family and is concerned with climate change.

Howe's plays have been produced in regional theatres in the United States, such as Louisville, Los Angeles, Stockbridge, Massachusetts, Annapolis, Maryland and San Diego, as well as in London. Her plays have premiered in venues such as the Humana Festival at Actors Theatre of Louisville (Rembrandt's Gift, 2002) the Public Theater (The Art of Dining, 1979), and the Second Stage Theatre (One Shoe Off, 1983).

== Other ==
Howe had taught master classes at New York University, UCLA, Columbia University and Carnegie Mellon.

Howe was a Visiting Professor of playwriting and Playwright in Residence at Hunter College in New York City, retiring in 2015. She was the head of the two year MFA playwriting program which began in 2010. (Annie Baker has taken the position formerly held by Howe.)

Howe was a member of the council of the Dramatists Guild of America from 1990.

Several of her works can be read in the volumes Coastal Disturbances: Four Plays by Tina Howe and Approaching Zanzibar and Other Plays.

Her papers are held by the Harvard Theatre Collection at Houghton Library.

== Personal life ==
Howe was married to historian Norman Levy from 1961 until his death in 2022. He taught American History at the University at Albany from 1967 to 1973. The couple had two children, and lived in the Bronx after years on the Upper West Side of Manhattan.

Howe died in Manhattan on August 28, 2023, at age 85, from complications of a hip fracture sustained in a fall.

== Plays ==
- Closing Time (1959)
- The Nest (1970)
- Birth and After Birth (1972–1977)
- Museum (1976)
- The Art of Dining (1979)
- Painting Churches (1983)
- Coastal Disturbances (1986)
- Approaching Zanzibar (1989)
- One Shoe Off (1993)
- East of the Sun and West of the Moon (1994–95)
- Pride's Crossing (1997)
- Rembrandt's Gift (2002)
- The Bald Soprano (English translation of Eugène Ionesco, 2004)
- The Lesson (English translation of Eugène Ionesco, 2004)
- Chasing Manet (2009)
- Cheri (2013)
- Breaking the Spell (2013)
- Singing Beach (2017)
- Where Women Go (2023)

== Awards and honors ==
Howe received a Rockefeller Grant (1983), two National Endowment for the Arts fellowships, a Guggenheim Fellowship (1990), and an American Academy of Arts and Letters Award in Literature (1993). Howe was awarded an honorary Doctor of Humane Letters (L.H.D) degree from Whittier College in 1997 and Honoris causa, Doctor of Letters from Bowdoin College (1998).

Howe received the William Inge Theatre Festival Award in 2005. In 2007 she received the Horton Foote Award, presented at the Baylor University Horton Foote American Playwrights Festival.

In 2012, she received the 3rd Annual Lilly Award Lifetime Achievement Award. The Lilly Awards were created to "recognize the extraordinary contributions made by women to the American Theater."

Howe was inducted into the American Theatre Hall of Fame for 2017. At the ceremony in November 2017 at the Gershwin Theatre, she was introduced by her long-time friend Jane Alexander, who said "She has passion, wit and absurdity.... [her plays are an] operatic dive into the depths.... She writes as no one else does about women..."

=== List of awards ===
- 1983 Obie Award for Distinguished Playwriting (winner)
- 1983 Rockefeller Grant for Distinguished Playwriting (winner)
- 1984 Pulitzer Prize for Drama Painting Churches (finalist)
- 1987 Tony Award Best Play Coastal Disturbances (nominee)
- 1990 Guggenheim Fellowship (winner)
- 1993 American Academy of Arts and Letters Award in Literature (winner)
- 1997 Pulitzer Prize for Drama Pride's Crossing (finalist)
- 1998 New York Drama Critics' Circle Award for Best American Play, Pride's Crossing (winner)
- 1998 Dramatists Guild Fund, Madge Evans & Sidney S. Kingsley Award (winner)
- 2005 William Inge Award for Distinguished Achievement in the American Theater (winner)
- 2015 PEN/Laura Pels Theater Award, Master American Dramatist
