= Elizabeth Gertrude Stern =

- Elizabeth Gertrude Stern in 1907
- Born: Elizabeth Gertrude Stern; February 14, 1889
- Died: January 1, 1954 (aged 64); Philadelphia
- Occupation: Writer
- Spouse: Leon Thomas Stern

Elizabeth Gertrude Stern (Feb 14, 1889 – Jan 9, 1954) was an American author, journalist, and essayist. She also wrote under the pen names Leah Morton, Eleanor Morton, and E. G. Stern.

== Education ==
Elizabeth Gertrude Stern earned her B.A. from the University of Pittsburgh in 1911.

== Family life ==
In 1911 Elizabeth Gertrude Stern married penologist, Leon Thomas Stern (1887–1980). They worked closely together, and co-authored the book "A Friend in Court" published in 1923 by the Macmillan Company. They had two sons, Thomas Leon Stern born in 1913, and Richard LeFevre, born in 1921. She died in Philadelphia in January 1954 at the age of 64. She was survived by her husband, Leon, who lived until 1980.

== Quotations ==
"I remember looking down at the face of my father, beautiful and still in death, and for a brief, terrible moment feeling my heart rise up--surely it was in a strange, suffocating relief?--as the realization came to me: "Now I am free!" All my life, for 29 years, he had stood like an image of fine-carved stone, immovable, unbending, demanding that I submit my will and my thought, my every act in life, to the creed he represented. His creed was that of Judaism, brought to the 20th century from the 15th, and held with an intensity and a passionate faith that would destroy everything in his life, the very happiness of his children, that it might not be, in one small observance, unhonored." --"I am a Woman and a Jew" by Elizabeth Gertrude Stern (pseud. Leah Morton) 1926

“I ardently believe in pretending. I council the young – and the old as well—not to say frankly what they are. I believe, deeply, in having all the pleasant make-believe we can build about ourselves. And I believe this because I know the imaginary person any of us presents must be a shield before oneself. The pretended image we offer is a mask put up naively in front of our faces—as old mimes in Greek plays held their masks of tragedy and comedy, beauty and splendor and shame, quite candidly before their faces, spectators looking on. The audience knew the player undertook his part and the mask fitted the part and that was all that was asked.” --"Not All Laughter" by Elizabeth Gertrude Stern (pseud. Eleanor Morton) 1937

== Foreword by Theodore Roosevelt ==
In 1916 Elizabeth Gertrude Stern's Essay, "My Mother and I," was published in the Ladies' Home Journal. The piece includes a foreword by President Theodore Roosevelt.

Sagamore Hill. This account describes the Americanization of a young girl. The progress she made in her development represents a significant transition compared to that of her ancestors. While there are concerns regarding the development of American civilization, the text examines the opportunities available to individuals who have been denied rights elsewhere—rights that are considered standard, though not always accessible to every person who seeks them. This story is commended.

In Aviva F. Taubenfeld's book, "Rough Writing: Ethnic Authorship in Theodore Roosevelt’s America," Taubenfeld questions why a relatively unknown author such as Stern should receive such a strong recommendation from the president. Taubenfeld suggests that Roosevelt may have championed Stern's story as part of an ongoing campaign to advance his own ideological goals via popular media. Taubenfeld writes "Roosevelt's patronage of Elizabeth Stern's story provides a crucial link between his simultaneous desires to remake the American woman and home and to Americanize the foreigner".

== In popular culture ==
Elizabeth Gertrude Stern is a character in Eve Merriam's play, "Out of Our Father's House," based on Merriam's book "Growing Up Female in America". The play takes place in the 1910s and features six women, "a schoolgirl-- founder of the Women's Suffrage Movement, an astronomer, a labor organizer, a minister, a doctor and a woman from the Jewish ghetto." The play was televised as PBS's Great Performances: "Out of Our Father's House", in 1978, with the role of Elizabeth Gertrude Stern played by actress Dianne Wiest.

== Works ==
- My Mother and I (with foreword by Theodore Roosevelt) (1917) Full Text On-line
- A Friend at Court, with L.T. Stern (1923)
- I Am a Woman—and a Jew (1926; reprint 1969, 1986)
- This Ecstasy (1927)
- A Marriage Was Made (1928)
- When Love Comes to Woman (1929)
- Gambler’s Wife (1931)
- Not All Laughter: A Mirror to Our Times (1937)
- Memories: The Life of Margaret McAvoy Scott (1943)
- Josiah White: Prince of Pioneers (1947)
- The Women Behind Gandhi (1953)
