= Out of Our Father's House =

- "Out of Our Father's House" DVD cover
- Genre: Biography; Drama; Music; Romance
- Written by: Jack Hofsiss, Eve Merriam, Paula Wagner
- Directed by: Jack Hofsiss
- Starring: Maureen Anderman; Jackie Burroughs; Carol Kane; Kaiulani Lee; Jan Miner; Dianne Wiest
- Theme music composer: Jack Feldman
- Country of origin: United States
- Original language: English

Production
- Producer: Judy Kinberg
- Running time: 59 min.
- Production companies: American National Theatre and Academy; KQED; PBS

Original release
- Network: PBS
- Release: August 2, 1978

Out of Our Father's House is a 1978 episode of PBS's Great Performances series. This episode was first broadcast on 2 August 1978 on PBS. The movie is a televised play of the work by Eve Merriam. The play is about six real-life leaders of the women's suffrage movement.

== Cast ==
The TV movie stars Jackie Burroughs as astronomer Maria Mitchell, Carol Kane as Eliza Southgate, Dianne Wiest as author Elizabeth Gertrude Stern, Maureen Anderman as Doctor Anna Howard Shaw, Kaiulani Lee as Elizabeth Cady Stanton, and Jan Miner as "Mother" Mary Jones (full name Mary Harris Jones).

The original play by the same name was written by Eve Merriam, and was based on her book "Growing Up Female in America".
