= Mark Antony De Wolfe Howe (writer) =

American editor and biographer

Mark Antony De Wolfe Howe Jr.
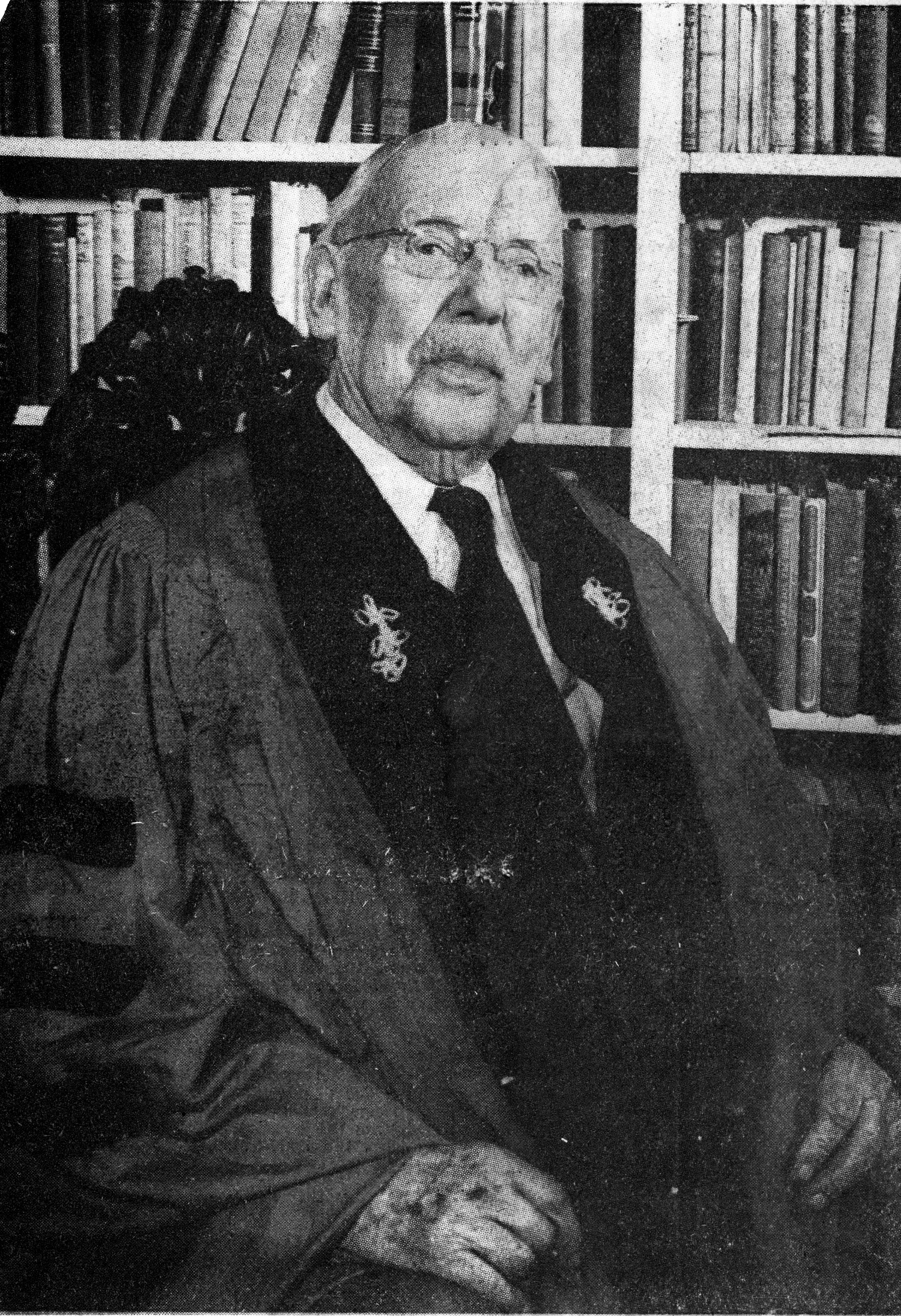
- Born: August 23, 1864; Bristol, Rhode Island, U.S.
- Died: December 6, 1960 (aged 96); New York City, U.S.
- Education: Lehigh University; Harvard University
- Occupations: editor, author, the recipient
- Spouse: Fanny Huntington Quincy (m. 1899)
- Children: Quincy Howe; Helen Howe; Mark DeWolfe Howe

Mark Antony De Wolfe Howe Jr. (August 23, 1864 – December 6, 1960) was an American editor, author, and the recipient of the 1925 Pulitzer Prize for Biography or Autobiography.

== Biography ==
Howe was born in Bristol, Rhode Island, the son of Bishop Mark Antony De Wolfe Howe and Eliza Whitney. In 1886, he graduated from Lehigh University and in 1887 from Harvard University (Master of Arts, 1888).

He served as associate editor of the Youth's Companion from 1888 to 1893 and from 1899 to 1913. He also served as assistant editor of the Atlantic Monthly in 1893-1895, and as editor of the Harvard Alumni Bulletin until 1913. He was vice president of the Atlantic Monthly company from 1911 to 1929. As an author, he won the 1925 Pulitzer Prize for Biography or Autobiography for Barrett Wendell and His Letters. He was the editor of Harvard Volunteers in Europe in 1916. He received an honorary Litt. D. from Lehigh in 1916.

In 1899, he married Fanny Huntington Quincy (1870–1933), an essayist and author, who was a sister of Josiah Quincy (1859–1919). The couple had two sons and one daughter: journalist Quincy Howe (1900-1977), author Helen Huntington Howe (1905-1975), and Mark DeWolfe Howe (1906-1967), Harvard law professor, civil rights activist, and law clerk and biographer of Oliver Wendell Holmes Jr. He lived in Boston, and had a summer home in Cotuit, Massachusetts. He died at the home of his son Mark in Cambridge, Massachusetts.

Through his son Quincy, Howe was the grandfather of playwright Tina Howe.

== Published works ==
Besides editing The Memory of Lincoln (1889), Home Letters of General Sherman (1909), The Beacon Biographies (31 volumes, 1899–1910), and Lines of Battle and Other Poems by Henry Howard Brownell (1912), he published the following:

- Shadows (1897)
- American Bookmen (1898)
- Phillips Brooks (1899)
- Boston: The Place and People (1903)
- Life and Letters of George Bancroft (1908)
- Harmonics: A Book of Verse (1909)
- Boston Common: Scenes from Four Centuries (1910)
- Life and Labors of Bishop Hare, Apostle to the Sioux (1911)
- Letters of Charles Eliot Norton (1813), with Sara Norton
- The Boston Symphony Orchestra (1914, rev. 1931)
- The Harvard Volunteers in Europe (1916)
- The Humane Society of the Commonwealth of Massachusetts (1918)
- The Atlantic Monthly and Its Makers (1919)
- George von Lengerke Meyer, His Life and Public Services (1919)
- Memoirs of the Harvard Dead in the War against Germany two volumes, (1920, 1921)
- Classic Shades (1928)
- John Jay Chapman and His Letters (1937)
- Who Lived Here? (1952)

== See also ==
- DeWolf family

== Notes and references ==
- Encyclopedia Americana (Volume 14: 1969) page 457.
