= Birth and After Birth =

Absurdist play written by Tina Howe

Birth and After Birth is an absurdist play written by Tina Howe. It was written in 1972 but it was not produced off-Broadway until 2006. Before this, it had its world premiere at the Wilma Theatre in Philadelphia, Pennsylvania in 1995. Howe's play was originally met with backlash and she was quoted saying "The absurdists can shake up our preconceptions about power and identity but for a woman to take on the sanctity of motherhood, even my agent at the time dismissed me.” Its first off-Broadway performance was with the Atlantic Theatre Company and it was directed by Christian Parker. Howe has been compared to many of the great absurdist writers of the 20th century due to her loose structure and nonsense plot.

== Plot summary ==
Act One: The play opens and it is a child's birthday. Two parents, Sandy Apple and Bill Apple have spent all night preparing decorations and wrapping the gifts when their child, Nicky, comes downstairs far too early. He does not listen to his parents' wishes that he goes back upstairs but rather has a tantrum and goes straight to the gifts. Sandy tries to get Nicky to read his cards before opening his gifts but he refuses to listen or acknowledge his mother at all. During this incident the Bill continuously films the son and tries to get him to play along and be in his movie. During the continuous argument with their child, Bill and Sandy discuss the upcoming party that night and their two guests, Mia Freed and Jeffery Freed. Sandy is continuously bringing up the topic of parenthood and is confused as to how Mia and Jeffery do not want parenthood.

Act Two: [2] Act two opens with Sandy, Bill, and Nicky playing a game around a table. Sandy and Bill are still discussing the Freed's lack of children and how disturbing it is. As the Freed's arrive Sandy and Bill's mood instantly changes and they are excited to see their new friends. During the process of the party Nicky continues to have meltdowns and all of the Freed's accomplishments are introduced to the audience. Despite their work accomplishments and knowing seventeen languages, the Apples keep going back to their lack of children. Saying even though they have traveled the world, done amazing things, their life essentially has no meaning due to their lack of children. The play ends with Nicky wishing for siblings for his birthday, but it is revealed that Sandy is now barren and cannot have anymore children. Both her and Bill are distraught by this and continue to try. Mia and Jeffery Freed leave for the night and the Apple Family continues their birthday celebration.

== Character summary ==
Sandy Apple: A mother in her early thirties. She is an obsessive character who has no control over her own life or family. She often ignores her husband and is ignored by her husband. She believes that motherhood is a great gift to the world and does not understand those who do not want motherhood.

Bill Apple: A father in his middle thirties. A man who is consumed by making a film about his son rather than being present in his own life. Constantly trying to gain his sons attention and ignores his wife's pleas for order in the home.

Nicky Apple: A four-year-old child. A misbehaving child who is celebrating his birthday. During the play he switches from acting like a new born to a full-fledged adult. He has no respect for his parents or their wishes and does whatever it takes to get exactly what he wants.

Mia Freed: An anthropologist in her early thirties. She has no children and would rather study children in other cultures than have her own.

Jeffery Freed. Another anthropologist, also in his early thirties. He is married to Mia and has no wish for children either.

== Themes ==
Existentialism: The idea that nothing matters in the world and that a person has to make meaning in their lives for it to hold any value, is a common theme.

Parenthood: The idea of parenthood, specifically motherhood is introduced within the first act of this play. The idea that a woman does not want motherhood is a foreign concept to the two main characters who, despite having an ill-behaved child, believe that every person should long for parenthood. Howe uses the absurdity and contrast of lives to show how many women are still treated in today's society. Through this play Howe brings to light the idea of motherhood not being for everyone, and the backlash that can come with this decision. The Apples represent the average person and their sexist view on women and their bodies. A women who is able to have children must have children or their life is pointless, despite their accomplishments. There is a persistent fear that down the line the women will regret not having children. This, paired with the existentialist ideals of the play, is an attempt to lampoon the anti-feminist point of view.
