= Annette Bening =

American actress (born 1958)

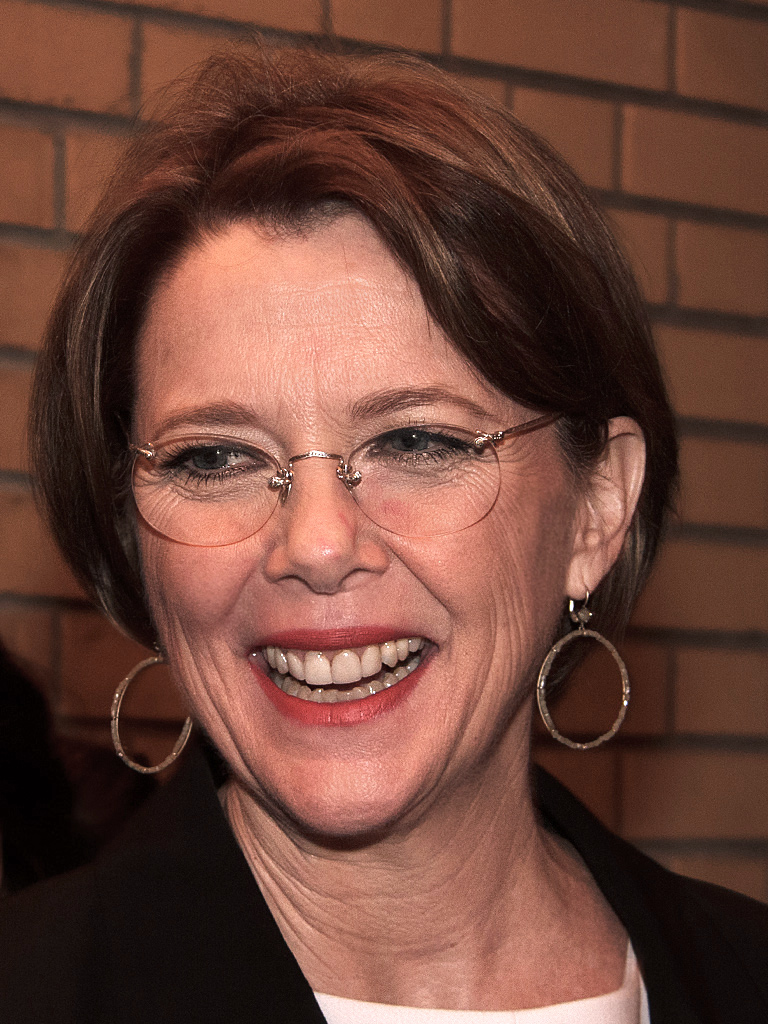
- Bening at the 2013 Toronto International Film Festival
- Born: Annette Carol Bening; May 29, 1958 (age 68); Topeka, Kansas, U.S.
- Education: San Francisco State University (BA); American Conservatory Theater (MFA)
- Occupation: Actress
- Years active: 1980–present
- Works: Full list
- Spouses: J. Steven White (m. 1984; div. 1991); Warren Beatty (m. 1992)
- Children: 4, including Ella
- Relatives: Shirley MacLaine (sister-in-law)
- Awards: Full list

Annette Carol Bening (born May 29, 1958) is an American actress. With a career spanning over four decades, she is known for her versatile work across screen and stage. Bening has received numerous accolades, including a BAFTA Award, two Actor Awards, and two Golden Globe Awards, in addition to nominations for five Academy Awards, two Tony Awards, and a Primetime Emmy Award, making her one of few artists nominated for the Triple Crown of Acting without winning.

A graduate of San Francisco State University and the American Conservatory Theater, Bening started her career on stage with the Colorado Shakespeare Festival company in 1980, and played Lady Macbeth in 1984 at the American Conservatory Theater. She made her Broadway debut in the Tina Howe play Coastal Disturbances (1987) for which she received a nomination for the Tony Award for Best Featured Actress in a Play. Making her film debut in 1988, she gained further recognition for her role in The Grifters (1990), for which she received her first Academy Award nomination. This acclaim continued throughout the 1990s and 2000s with further Oscar-nominated performances in the comedy-dramas American Beauty (1999) and Being Julia (2004), which respectively won her the BAFTA and Golden Globe for Best Actress. Bening's performance as the title character in the British television film Mrs. Harris (2005) earned her a nomination for the Primetime Emmy Award for Outstanding Lead Actress in a Miniseries or Movie.

In following decades, Bening received two additional Oscar nominations for her leading roles as a lesbian mother in The Kids Are All Right (2010) and swimmer Diana Nyad in the Netflix biographical film Nyad (2023), the former of which also won her a Golden Globe. She returned to Broadway in the revival of Arthur Miller's All My Sons (2019) earning another Tony nomination for Best Actress in a Play. Her other roles during this period include in the films 20th Century Women (2016), Film Stars Don't Die in Liverpool (2017), Captain Marvel (2019) and Death on the Nile (2022), the miniseries Apples Never Fall (2024) and the series Dutton Ranch (2026).

== Early life and education ==
Annette Carol Bening was born on May 29, 1958 in Topeka, Kansas, to Shirley Katherine (née Ashley) and Arnett Grant Bening. Her mother was a church singer and soloist, and her father was a sales training consultant and insurance salesman. Her parents, originally from Iowa, were practicing Episcopalians and conservative Republicans. She is of mostly German and English descent.

The youngest of four children, she has a sister Jane, and two brothers Bradley and Byron. The family moved to Wichita, Kansas, in 1959, where she spent her early childhood. When Bening was in elementary school, her father relocated the family to San Diego, California, where she spent the remainder of her youth.

She began acting in junior high school, playing the lead in The Sound of Music. She graduated in 1975 from San Diego's Patrick Henry High School, where she studied drama. She then spent a year working as a cook on a charter boat taking fishing parties out on the Pacific Ocean, and scuba diving for recreation. Bening attended San Diego Mesa College and graduated with a degree in Theatre Arts at San Francisco State University.

== Career ==
=== 1986–1999: Initial work, breakthrough and rise to prominence ===
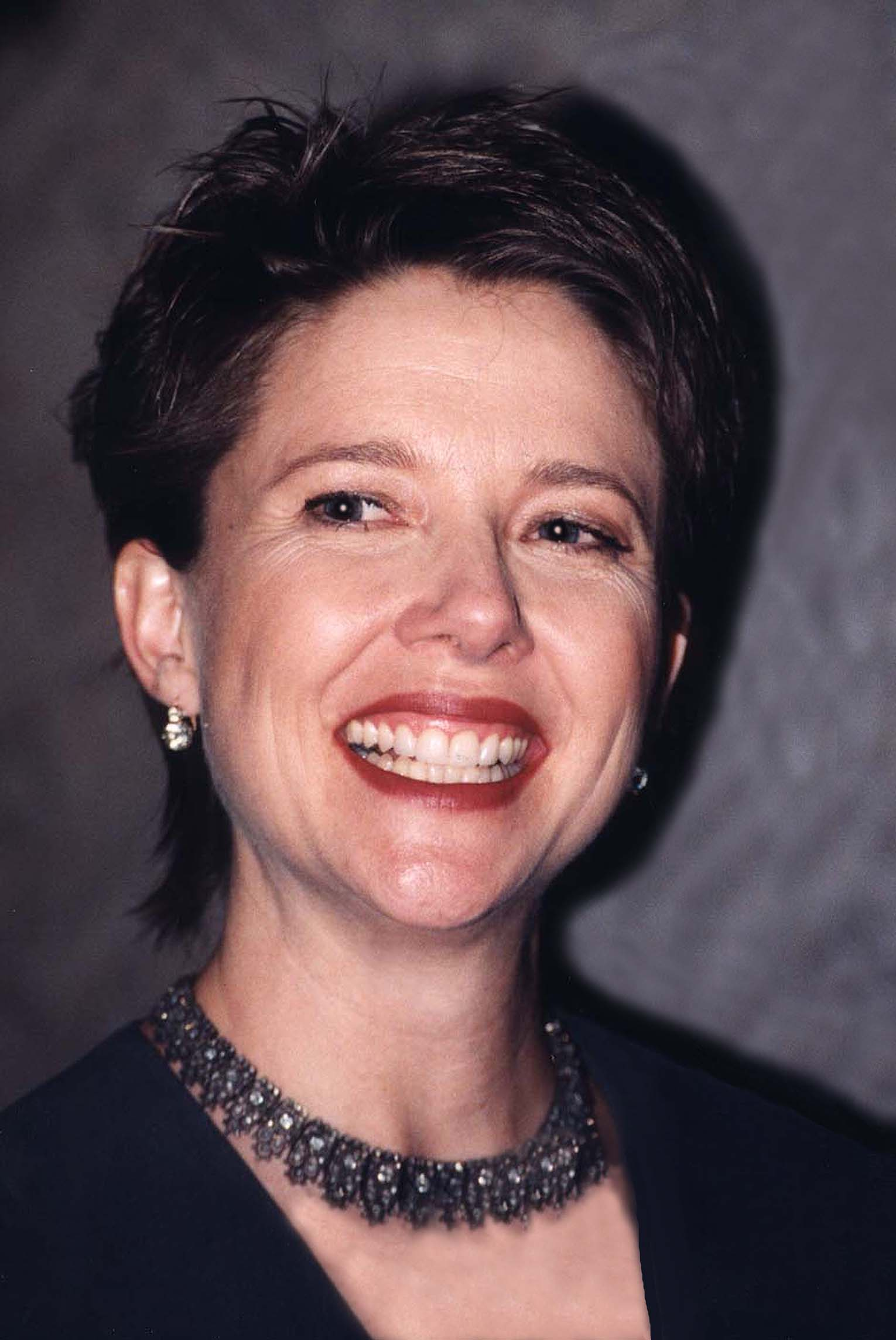
Bening in 1999

Bening began her career on stage with the Colorado Shakespeare Festival company in 1980, and appeared in plays at the San Diego Repertory Theatre. She was a member of the acting company at the American Conservatory Theater in San Francisco while studying acting as part of the Advanced Theatre Training Program. There, she starred in such productions as Shakespeare's Macbeth as Lady Macbeth. Bening also starred in productions of Pygmalion and The Cherry Orchard at the Denver Center Theatre Company during the 1985–86 season. She made her Broadway debut in 1987, garnering a Tony Award nomination for Best Featured Actress in a Play and receiving a Theatre World Award for her performance as young photographer Holly Dancer in Coastal Disturbances. Bening made her film debut in The Great Outdoors (1988), starring Dan Aykroyd and John Candy. Her next role was as the Marquise de Merteuil in Valmont (1989) opposite Colin Firth.

Bening achieved her breakthrough with her performance as con artist Myra Langtry in the neo-noir crime thriller The Grifters (1990), for which she earned her first nominations for the Academy Award for Best Supporting Actress and the BAFTA Award for Best Actress in a Supporting Role. In 1991, she portrayed Virginia Hill in Barry Levinson's biopic Bugsy, alongside Warren Beatty. For Bugsy, she received her first nomination for the Golden Globe Award for Best Actress in a Motion Picture – Drama. Bening co-starred with Harrison Ford in Regarding Henry. In 1994, Bening and Beatty starred together again, in Love Affair. In 1995, Bening played a leading role as an environmental lobbyist in The American President with Michael Douglas, a role she followed with Tim Burton's sci-fi spoof Mars Attacks! (1996), and The Siege (1998), a thriller with Denzel Washington and Bruce Willis.

Bening garnered acclaim for her starring role in Sam Mendes' directorial debut film, American Beauty (1999). She starred opposite Kevin Spacey in the dark comedy-drama about a man suffering a mid-life crisis in 90s American suburbia. The film won five Academy Awards, including Best Picture. For her performance as Carolyn Burnham, a materialistic wife engaging in an affair, Bening won the BAFTA Award for Best Actress in a Leading Role and the Actor Award for Outstanding Performance by a Female Actor in a Leading Role, in addition to her first nomination for the Academy Award for Best Actress and her second nomination for the Golden Globe Award for Best Actress in a Motion Picture – Drama.

In 1999, Bening returned to the stage for the first time in 10 years playing the title role in Hedda Gabler at the Geffen Playhouse in Los Angeles. The Los Angeles Times praised her performance saying "Bening uses her vocal instrument to fine effect, without throwing it around... In the movies you don't always hear what Bening can do with that voice, especially when she's playing virtuous, "sensible" types... But Ibsen's antiheroine—thwarted sensualist, a woman wrestling with her inner troll, belle of a ball that never comes—is neither virtuous nor sensible. She's no easy-to-read villain, either, nor a mere vindictive brat, though plenty of actresses have reduced her thus. Bening lays into the venomous sarcasm mighty heavily, but she's cagey enough to avoid reductive extremes."

=== 2000–2014: Established actress ===
Bening starred in other films, including In Dreams (1999) and What Planet Are You From? (2000). Bening played Sue Barlow in Open Range (2003). She earned critical acclaim for playing the eponymous lead in the comedy-drama Being Julia (2004). For her performance in the film, she won her first Golden Globe Award in addition to her second Academy Award and Actor Award nominations. She received Emmy Award and Golden Globe Award nominations for her role of convicted celebrity murderer Jean Harris in the HBO film Mrs. Harris (2005). She replaced Julianne Moore and starred as Deirdre Burroughs, an aspiring poet with bipolar disorder, in the film adaptation of Running with Scissors (2006).

Bening at the Toronto Film Festival 2005

. She earned her fifth Golden Globe nomination. Bening starred in The Women (2008) remake. In 2009, Bening starred in a new interpretation of the Euripides classic Medea at UCLA's Freud Playhouse. She received positive reviews for her performance in the independent film Mother and Child (2009).

In 2010, she starred in The Female of the Species, Joanna Murray-Smith's comedy, at the Geffen Playhouse in Los Angeles. Later that year, Bening received critical acclaim for her performance in The Kids Are All Right; a reviewer said that she "deserves an Oscar" and another praised her "sublime" performance. For her role, Bening won her second Golden Globe and was nominated for her third Academy Award, third BAFTA, and six and seventh Actor Awards (she received nominations for both Best Actress and Best Cast).

In 2012, Bening's audiobook recording of Virginia Woolf's Mrs. Dalloway was released at Audible.com. In 2014, she starred in Shakespeare's King Lear at the Delacorte Theater in Central Park, as part of the Public Theatre's Free Shakespeare in the Park. It marked her first New York stage appearance in twenty years. Bening starred in Dan Fogelman's 2015 American comedy drama Danny Collins with Al Pacino.

=== 2016–present: Later career ===
In 2016, Bening starred in Mike Mills's comedy drama 20th Century Women alongside Elle Fanning, Greta Gerwig, and Billy Crudup. Bening played a chain-smoking first-wave feminist struggling to raise her teenage son. Sheila O'Malley of Roger Ebert.com declared, "Bening has one of the best performances of the year (and one of Bening's personal best as well)". For her performance, she was nominated for the Independent Spirit Award for Best Female Lead and the Critics' Choice Movie Award for Best Actress.

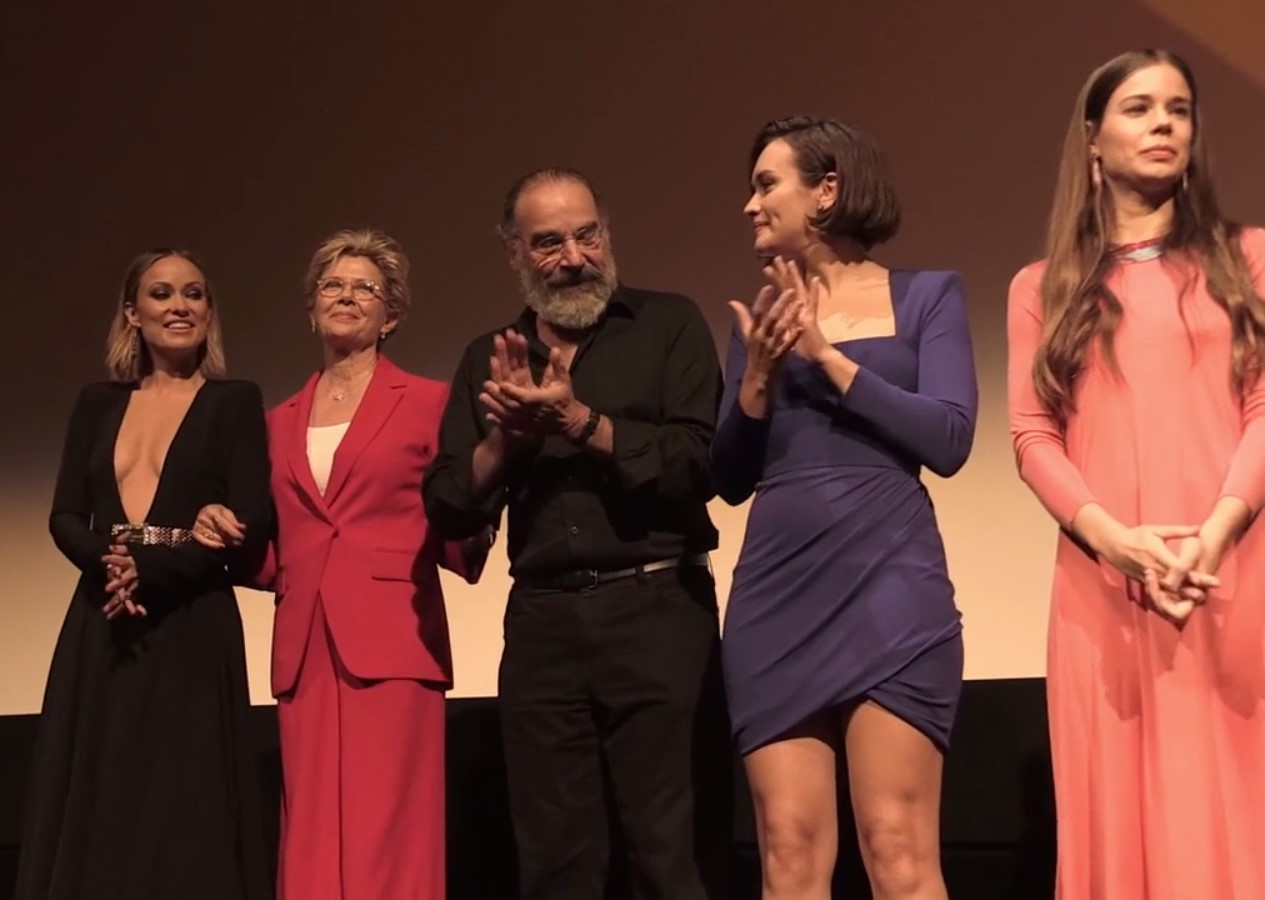
Olivia Wilde, Bening, Mandy Patinkin, Olivia Cooke, Laia Costa at the TIFF premiere for Life Itself in 2018

The following year, she portrayed Gloria Grahame in Film Stars Don't Die in Liverpool (2017) alongside Jamie Bell, Vanessa Redgrave, and Julie Walters. Peter Bradshaw critic from The Guardian praised her performance declaring, "Bening is excellent as Grahame: imperious, vulnerable, romantic, sexually excited about her younger man, wanly aware of secrets she cannot share with him". She received her third nomination for the BAFTA Award for Best Actress in a Leading Role for her performance in the film. The following year, she starred as Irina Arkadina in The Seagull and as Dr. Cait Morris in Life Itself (2018).

In 2019, Bening returned to the Broadway stage after a 32-year absence, starring in the revival of Arthur Miller's All My Sons alongside Tracy Letts at the Roundabout Theatre Company's American Airlines Theatre. The play opened on April 4, 2019, and closed on June 23, 2019. She was nominated for the Tony Award for Best Actress in a Play for her performance. The following year, she portrayed Senator Dianne Feinstein in the political drama film The Report (2019) for which she earned her first nomination for the Golden Globe Award for Best Supporting Actress – Motion Picture.

Bening joined the Marvel Cinematic Universe playing Dr. Wendy Lawson in Captain Marvel (2019) alongside Brie Larson. The film was a massive financial box-office hit. In 2022, she acted in Kenneth Branagh's Death on the Nile and the comedy Jerry & Marge Go Large opposite Bryan Cranston. That same year, she filmed Nyad alongside Jodie Foster, where Bening portrayed long-distance swimmer Diana Nyad. The film was distributed by Netflix and premiered at the 2023 Toronto International Film Festival. Her performance earned high critical acclaim, and earned her a fifth Academy Award nomination.

In 2023, Bening was elected Chair of the Board of Trustees for the Entertainment Community Fund. She next starred in Liane Moriarty's Apples Never Fall, based on the bestselling thriller which was adapted by Peacock and also features Sam Neill. The limited series premiered with all episodes immediately available to stream on March 15, 2024.

== Personal life ==
While training at the American Conservatory Theater, Bening met actor J. Steven White, marrying him in 1984. They moved to Colorado where White managed the Denver Center for the Performing Arts. They divorced in 1991.

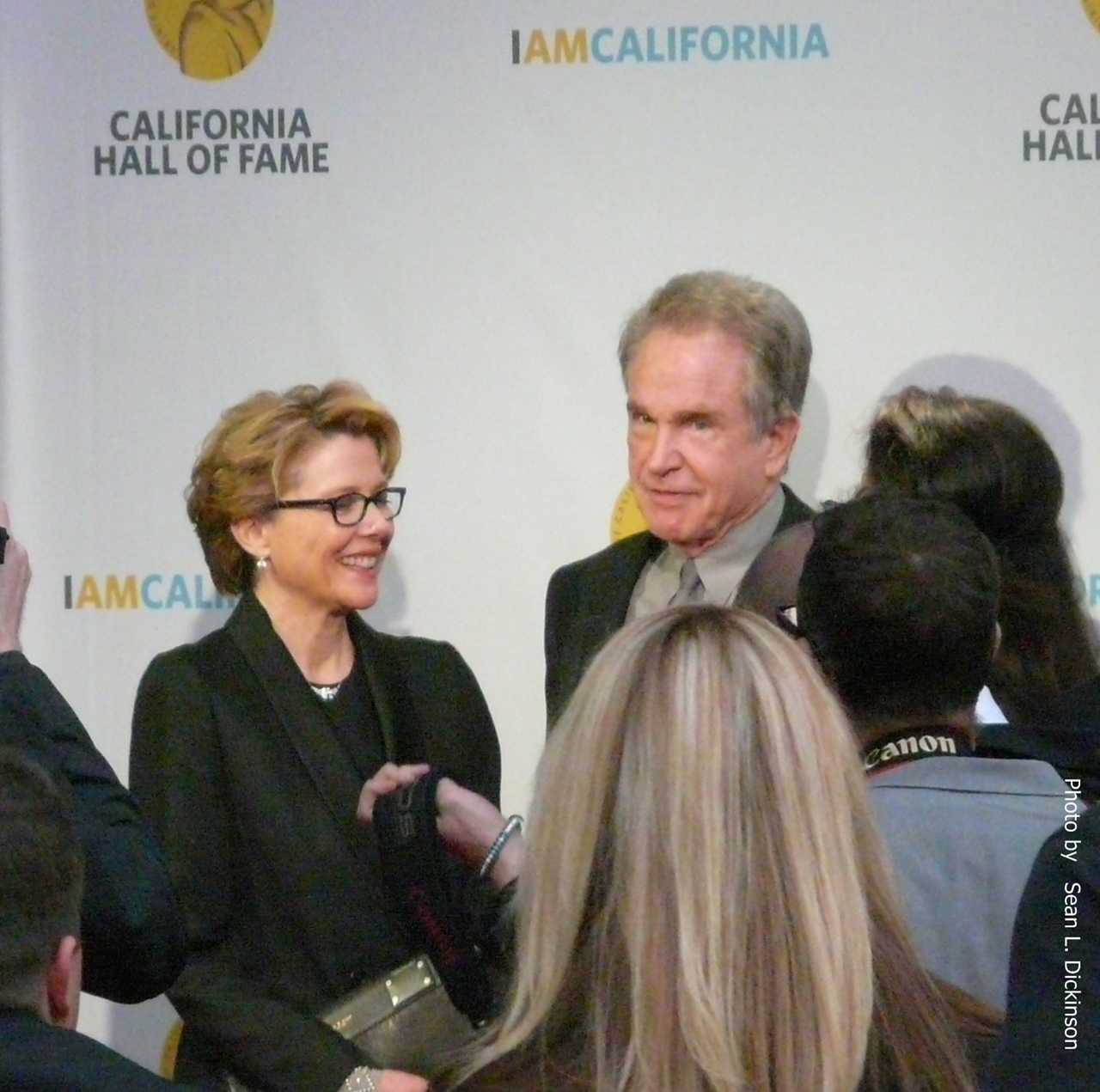
Bening with her husband Warren Beatty in 2013

She has been married to actor Warren Beatty since March 3, 1992. They have four children, including actress Ella Beatty.

== Acting credits and accolades ==
Bening has received numerous accolades, including a BAFTA Award, two Golden Globe Awards, and two Actor Awards. She has also received nominations for a Primetime Emmy Award and two Tony Awards.

She has also received five Academy Award nominations, for the following films:

- 63rd Academy Awards: Best Supporting Actress nomination for The Grifters (1990)
- 72nd Academy Awards: Best Actress nomination for American Beauty (1999)
- 77th Academy Awards: Best Actress nomination for Being Julia (2004)
- 83rd Academy Awards: Best Actress nomination for The Kids Are All Right (2010)
- 96th Academy Awards, Best Actress nomination for Nyad (2023)

== See also ==
- List of American film actresses
- List of American television actresses
- List of actors with Academy Award nominations
- List of actors with more than one Academy Award nomination in the acting categories
- List of Golden Globe winners
