= Dianne Wiest =

American actress (born 1948)

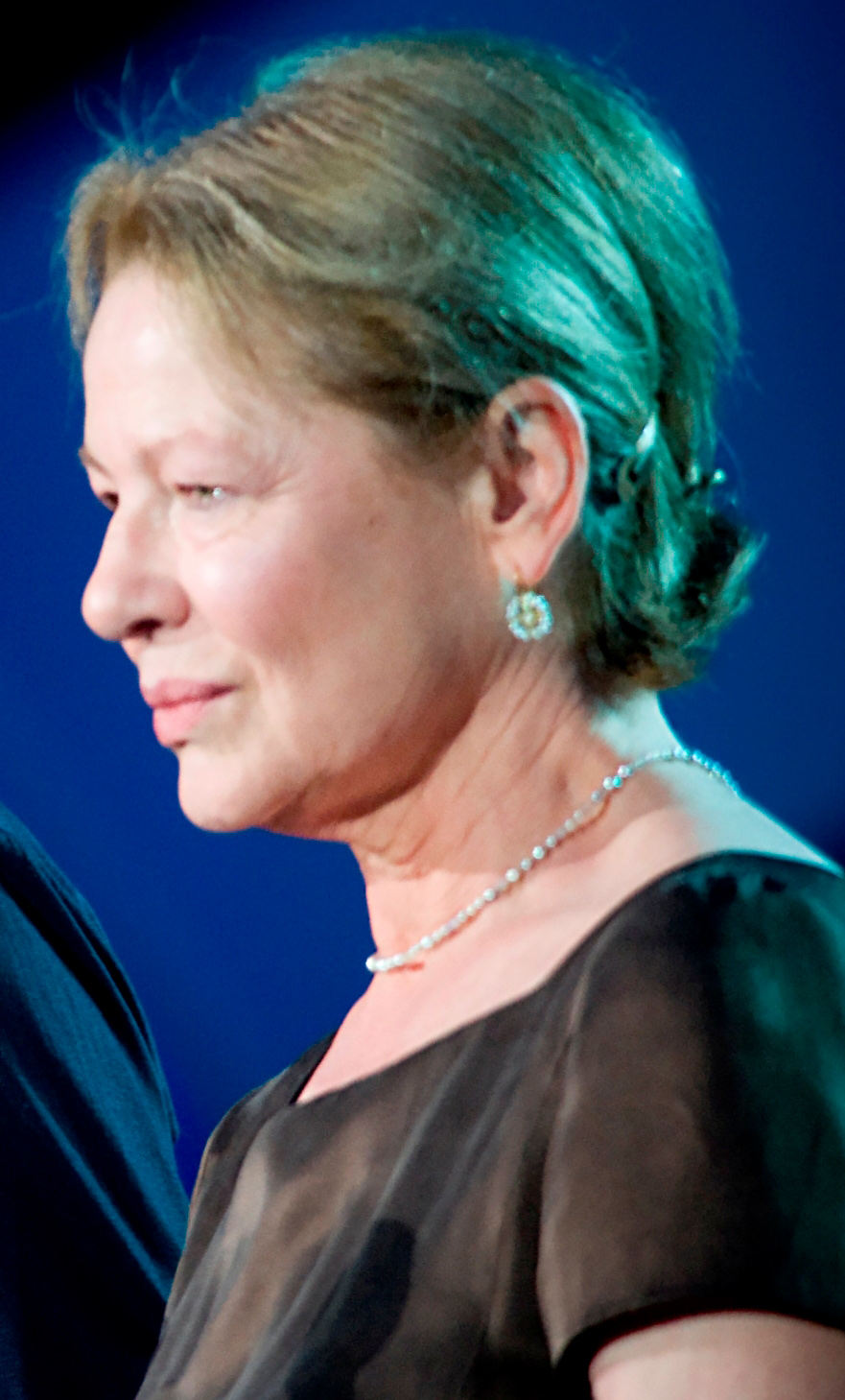
- Wiest in 2009
- Born: Dianne Evelyn Wiest; March 28, 1948 (age 78); Kansas City, Missouri, U.S.
- Education: University of Maryland
- Occupation: Actress
- Years active: 1970–present
- Children: 2
- Awards: Full list

Dianne Evelyn Wiest (/wiːst/; born March 28, 1948) is an American actress. She has won two Academy Awards for Best Supporting Actress for Hannah and Her Sisters (1986) and Bullets Over Broadway (1994) (both directed by Woody Allen), one Golden Globe Award for Bullets Over Broadway, the 1997 Primetime Emmy Award for Outstanding Guest Actress in a Drama Series for Road to Avonlea, and the 2008 Primetime Emmy Award for Outstanding Supporting Actress in a Drama Series for In Treatment. In addition, she was nominated for an Academy Award for Parenthood (1989).

Other film appearances by Wiest include Footloose (1984), Woody Allen's The Purple Rose of Cairo (1985), Radio Days and September (both 1987), The Lost Boys (1987), Bright Lights, Big City (1988), Edward Scissorhands (1990), Little Man Tate (1991), The Birdcage (1996), Practical Magic (1998), Dan in Real Life (2007), Synecdoche, New York (2008), Rabbit Hole (2010), The Mule (2018), Let Them All Talk (2020) and I Care a Lot (2020). She also appeared in the television series Law & Order (2000–2002), the CBS comedy Life in Pieces (2015–2019), and the Hulu comedy Only Murders in the Building (2025).

== Early life ==
Wiest was born on March 28, 1948, in Kansas City, Missouri. Her mother, Anne Stewart (née Keddie), was a nurse. Her father, Bernard John Wiest, was a college dean and former psychiatric social worker for the U.S. Army. Her parents met in Algiers. Wiest has two brothers, Greg and Don. She attended high school at Nurnberg American High School in Germany. Her ambition was to be a ballet dancer, but she switched her goal to theater during her senior year. Wiest graduated from the University of Maryland in 1969 with a degree in Arts and Sciences.

== Career ==
=== Stage ===
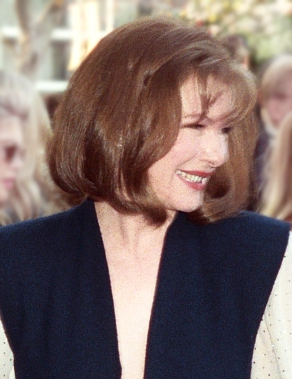
Wiest at the 1990 Academy Awards

Wiest left her theater studies in Maryland after the third term in order to tour with a Shakespearean troupe. Later, she had a supporting role in a New York Shakespeare Festival production of Ashes. She also acted at the Yale Repertory Theatre in New Haven, Connecticut, playing the title role in Henrik Ibsen's Hedda Gabler. She was an understudy both off-Broadway and on Broadway, in Kurt Vonnegut's Happy Birthday, Wanda June in 1970.

She made her Broadway debut in Robert Anderson's Solitaire/Double Solitaire, taking over in the role of the daughter in 1971. She landed a four-year job as a member of the Arena Stage in Washington, D.C., in such roles as Emily in Our Town, Honey in Who's Afraid of Virginia Woolf?, and leading roles in S. Ansky's The Dybbuk, Maxim Gorky's The Lower Depths and George Bernard Shaw's Heartbreak House. She toured the USSR with the Arena Stage. In 1976, Wiest attended the Eugene O'Neill National Playwrights Conference and starred in leading roles in Amlin Gray's Pirates and Christopher Durang's A History of the American Film. At Joe Papp's Public Theater she took over the lead in Ashes, and played Cassandra in Agamemnon, directed by Andrei Șerban. In 1979, she originated the role of Agnes in Agnes of God in its first production in Waterford, Connecticut.

She appeared in two plays by Tina Howe: Museum and The Art of Dining. In the latter, Wiest's performance as the shy and awkward author Elizabeth Barrow Colt won three off-Broadway theater awards: an Obie Award (1980), a Theatre World Award (1979–1980) and the Clarence Derwent Award (1980), given yearly for the most promising performance in New York theatre.

On Broadway she appeared in Frankenstein (1981), directed by Tom Moore, portrayed Desdemona in Othello (1982) opposite James Earl Jones and Christopher Plummer, and co-starred with John Lithgow in Christopher Durang's romantic screwball comedy Beyond Therapy (1982), directed by John Madden. (She played opposite Lithgow again in the Herbert Ross film Footloose). During the 1980s, she also performed in Hedda Gabler, directed by Lloyd Richards at Yale Repertory Theatre, and in Harold Pinter's A Kind of Alaska (1984, Manhattan Theatre Club), Lanford Wilson's Serenading Louie (1984), and Janusz Glowacki's Hunting Cockroaches (1987, Manhattan Theater Club). As Wiest became established as a film actress through her work in Woody Allen's films, she was less frequently available for stage roles. However, she did appear onstage during the 1990s, in In the Summer House, Square One, Cynthia Ozick's The Shawl, and Naomi Wallace's One Flea Spare. In 2003, she appeared with Al Pacino and Marisa Tomei in Oscar Wilde's Salome. In 2005, she starred in Kathleen Tolan's Memory House. She also starred in a production of Wendy Wasserstein's final play Third (directed by Daniel Sullivan) at Lincoln Center.

Later New York theater roles include performances as Arkadina in an off-Broadway revival of The Seagull (opposite Alan Cumming's Trigorin) and as Kate Keller in a Broadway revival of Arthur Miller's All My Sons, opposite John Lithgow, Patrick Wilson and Katie Holmes. In 2009, Wiest appeared in the National Memorial Day Concert on the Mall in Washington, D.C. in a dialogue with Katie Holmes celebrating the life of an American veteran seriously wounded in Iraq, José Pequeño. Wiest spent September 2010 as a visiting teacher at Columbia University's Graduate Acting Program, working with a group of 18 first-year MFA Acting students on selected plays by Anton Chekhov and Arthur Miller.

In 2016, Wiest took on the role of "Winnie" in The Yale Repertory Theatre's production of Samuel Beckett's Happy Days. She reprised the role for Theatre for a New Audience in downtown Brooklyn, New York, in the spring of 2017, and the Mark Taper Forum in Los Angeles in 2019.

=== Film and television ===
Her early screen roles include small roles in It's My Turn (credited onscreen as Diane Wiest) and I'm Dancing as Fast as I Can, both starring Jill Clayburgh in the lead roles. In 1984, she starred in Footloose, as the reverend's wife and Ariel Moore's mother. Under Woody Allen's direction, Wiest won an Academy Award for Best Supporting Actress for Hannah and Her Sisters in 1987 and Bullets Over Broadway in 1995. She also appeared in three other Woody Allen films: The Purple Rose of Cairo (1985), Radio Days (1987) and September (1987).

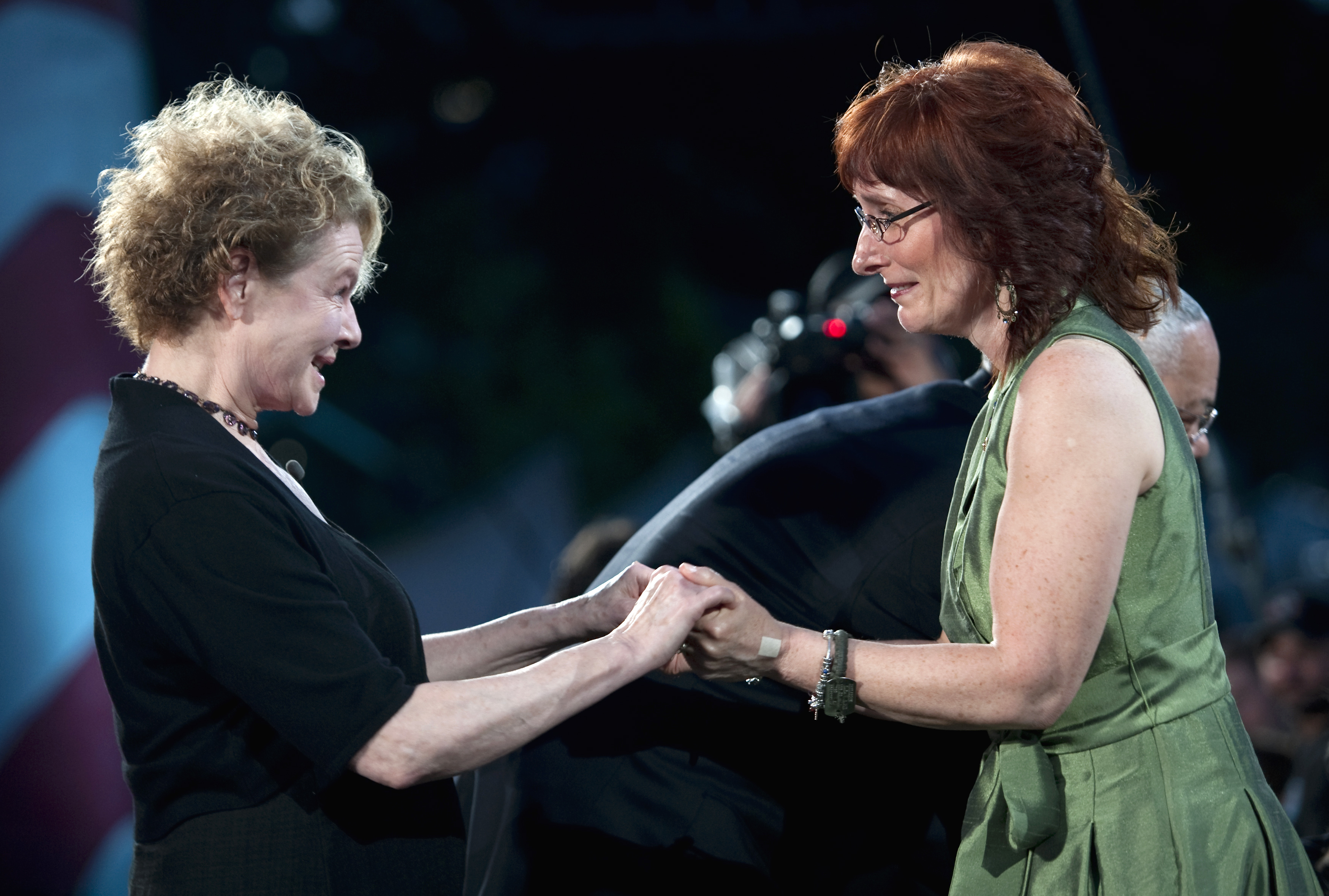
Wiest (left) in 2011

She followed her first Oscar success with performances in The Lost Boys (1987) and Bright Lights, Big City (1988). She also starred with Steve Martin, Mary Steenburgen, Jason Robards, Keanu Reeves and Martha Plimpton in Ron Howard's Parenthood (1989), for which she received her second Oscar nomination. Other major film roles include Tim Burton's Edward Scissorhands (1990), Jodie Foster's Little Man Tate (1991) and The Birdcage (1996), Mike Nichols's remake of La Cage aux Folles.

On television, her performance on the series Road to Avonlea in 1997 brought her her first Emmy Award for Outstanding Guest Actress in a Dramatic Series. She received another nomination for her performance in the telefilm The Simple Life of Noah Dearborn (1999), co-starring Sidney Poitier. She starred in the television miniseries The 10th Kingdom in 2000. From 2000 to 2002, Wiest portrayed interim District Attorney Nora Lewin in the NBC crime drama Law & Order. She also played the character in two episodes of Law & Order: Special Victims Unit and the pilot episode of Law & Order: Criminal Intent.

Wiest starred alongside Steve Carell and Juliette Binoche in Dan in Real Life (2007) and had a key supporting role in Charlie Kaufman's 2008 film Synecdoche, New York. In 2008, she also appeared as Gabriel Byrne's therapist, Gina Toll, on the HBO television series In Treatment, for which she received her second Emmy Award, for Outstanding Supporting Actress in a Drama Series. She received another nomination (in the same category) for the second season, in 2009, but did not win.

She starred alongside Nicole Kidman in Rabbit Hole (2010), whom she worked with on Practical Magic. Rabbit Hole debuted at the Toronto International Film Festival. Wiest also co-starred in Lawrence Kasdan's 2012 comedy Darling Companion, alongside Kevin Kline and Diane Keaton. In 2020, Wiest starred in Steven Soderbergh's drama Let Them All Talk alongside Meryl Streep and Candice Bergen. That same year she also starred opposite Rosamund Pike in the action thriller I Care a Lot.

From 2021 to 2023, she starred in the Paramount+ crime thriller series Mayor of Kingstown, and in 2025 it was announced that she would be joining the cast of Only Murders in the Building as the grieving widow of doorman Lester, Lorraine.

== Personal life ==
Wiest was in a relationship with her talent agent Sam Cohn for three years in the mid-1980s. She adopted two daughters: Emily and Lily.

== Filmography ==
=== Film ===
Year	Title	Role	Notes
1980	It's My Turn	Gail	Credited as Diane Wiest
1982	I'm Dancing as Fast as I Can	Julie Addison	
1983	Face of Rage	Rebecca Hammil	
1983	Independence Day	Nancy Morgan	
1984	Falling in Love	Isabelle	
1984	Footloose	Vi Moore	
1985	The Purple Rose of Cairo	Emma	
1986	Hannah and Her Sisters	Holly	
1987	Radio Days	Bea	
1987	September	Stephanie	
1987	The Lost Boys	Lucy Emerson	
1988	Bright Lights, Big City	Mrs. Conway	
1989	Parenthood	Helen Buckman	
1989	Cookie	Lenore Voltecki	
1990	Edward Scissorhands	Peg Boggs	
1991	Little Man Tate	Jane Grierson	
1994	Bullets Over Broadway	Helen Sinclair	
1994	Cops & Robbersons	Helen Robberson	
1994	The Scout	Doctor H. Aaron	
1995	Drunks	Rachel	
1996	The Associate	Sally Dugan	
1996	The Birdcage	Louise Keeley	
1998	Practical Magic	Aunt Bridget 'Jet' Owens	
1998	The Horse Whisperer	Diane Booker	
2001	I Am Sam	Annie Cassell	
2002	Merci Docteur Rey	Elisabeth Beaumont	
2005	Robots	Lydia Copperbottom	Voice
2006	A Guide to Recognizing Your Saints	Flori Montiel	
2007	Dedication	Carol	
2007	Dan in Real Life	Nana Burns	
2008	Passengers	Toni	
2008	Synecdoche, New York	Ellen Bascomb / Millicent Weems	
2009	Rage	Miss Roth	
2010	Rabbit Hole	Nat	
2011	The Big Year	Brenda Harris	
2012	Darling Companion	Penny Alexander	
2012	The Odd Life of Timothy Green	Ms. Crudstaff	
2014	The Humbling	Carol Stapleford	
2015	Five Nights in Maine	Lucinda	
2015	Sisters	Deana Ellis	
2018	The Mule	Mary Stone	
2020	I Care a Lot	Jennifer Peterson	
2020	Let Them All Talk	Susan	
2022	My Father's Dragon	Iris the Rhinoceros	Voice
2024	Apartment 7A	Minnie Castevet	
2026	Practical Magic 2	Aunt Bridget 'Jet' Owens	
2026	Closing Night	Diane	
TBA	Non Compos Mentis †		Post-production

=== Television ===
Year	Title	Role	Notes
1975	Zalmen: or, The Madness of God	Nina	Television film
1978	Great Performances: Out of Our Father's House	Elizabeth Gertrude Stern	Television film
1997	Road to Avonlea	Lillian Hepworth	1 episode
1999	The Simple Life of Noah Dearborn	Sarah McClellan	Television film
2000	The 10th Kingdom	The Evil Queen/Christine White	Miniseries, 5 episodes
2000–02	Law & Order	D.A. Nora Lewin	Lead role, 46 episodes
2001	Law & Order: Criminal Intent	D.A. Nora Lewin	1 episode
2001–02	Law & Order: Special Victims Unit	D.A. Nora Lewin	2 episodes
2004	The Blackwater Lightship	Lily Devereux Breen	Television film
2004	Category 6: Day of Destruction	Secretary of Energy Shirley Abbott	2 episodes
2008–09	In Treatment	Dr. Gina Toll	Main role, 17 episodes
2008	The Return of Jezebel James	Talia Tompkins	2 episodes
2011	Woody Allen: A Documentary	Herself	
2014	The Blacklist	Ruth Kipling	1 episode
2015–19	Life in Pieces	Joan Short	Main role, 79 episodes
2021–23	Mayor of Kingstown	Mariam McLusky	Main role, 19 episodes
2025	Only Murders in the Building	Lorraine Coluca	Recurring (season 5), 6 episodes
2025	Elsbeth	Reverend Mother Constance Mary Cabot	2 episodes

Key
†	Denotes films that have not yet been released

=== Stage ===
Year	Title	Role	Venue
1970	Happy Birthday, Wanda June	Understudy: Penelope Ryan, Mildred	Edison Theatre
1971	Solitaire / Double Solitaire	Daughter	John Golden Theatre
1977	Agamemnon	Cassandra	Delacorte Theatre
1979	The Art of Dining	Elizabeth Barrow Colt	Joseph Papp Public Theatre
1981	Frankenstein	Elizabeth Lavenza	Palace Theatre
1981	Hedda Gabler	Hedda Gabler	Yale Repertory Theatre
1982	Othello	Desdemona	Winter Garden Theatre
1982	Beyond Therapy	Prudence	Brooks Atkinson Theatre
1982	Three Sisters	Masha	Manhattan Theatre Club
1983	Ivanov	Anna Petrovna	Williamstown Theatre Festival
1984	Serenading Louie	Gaby	Second Stage
1984	After the Fall	Maggie	Playhouse 91
1984	A Kind of Alaska	Deborah	Manhattan Theatre Club
1987	Hunting Cockroaches	Anka	Manhattan Theatre Club
1988	Les Liaisons Dangereuses	La Marquise de Merteuil	Williamstown Theatre Festival
1993	In the Summer House	Gertrude Eastman Cuevas	Vivian Beaumont Theater
1997	One Flea Spare	Mrs. Darcy Snelgrave	The Public Theater
2003	Salome	Herodias	Ethel Barrymore Theatre
2005	Memory House	Maggie	Playwrights Horizons
2005	Third	Laurie Jameson	Mitzi E. Newhouse Theatre
2008–2009	All My Sons	Kate Keller	Gerald Schoenfeld Theatre
2008	The Seagull	Arkadina	CSC Theatre
2010	The Forest	Raisa Pavlovna Gurmyzhskaya	CSC Theatre
2011	The Cherry Orchard	Madame Ranevskaya	CSC Theatre
2015	Rasheeda Speaking	Ileen	The New Group
2016–2019	Happy Days	Winnie	Yale Repertory Theatre
2016–2019	Happy Days	Winnie	Theatre for a New Audience
2016–2019	Happy Days	Winnie	Mark Taper Forum
2023	Scene Partners	Meryl Kowalski	Vineyard Theatre

== Awards and honors ==
Wiest has been nominated for three Academy Awards for Best Supporting Actress and received two wins for her performances in the Woody Allen films Hannah and Her Sisters (1986) and Bullets Over Broadway (1994). She has received four Primetime Emmy Award nominations for her work on television, winning two awards for Road to Avonlea (1996) and In Treatment (2008). She has also received two Golden Globe Award nominations and two Screen Actors Guild Award nominations.
