= The Art of Dining =

Play written by Tina Howe

The Art Of Dining is a play by Tina Howe which premiered Off-Broadway in 1979. The play showcases the bizarre relationships three groups of characters have with food. The play is set during November in a New Jersey restaurant, newly opened by couple Ellen and Cal, who have everything riding on each night's cash flow. Both cooking and eating take place onstage. Obie Awards were won by Dianne Wiest for her performance and director A. J. Antoon.

== Background ==
Joseph Papp and Roger L. Stevens (Kennedy Center Chairman) had planned to start a joint repertory company in the fall of 1980 between the Kennedy Center and Papp's New York Shakespeare Festival. The first play in this collaboration was a co-production of The Art of Dining.

In an interview in 1983, Howe said that she had strong feelings about food. "What I wanted to do in both Museum (1976) and The Art of Dining was to present a lovely exterior, then seduce the audience into the dark and mysterious places inside."

== Production ==
The Art of Dining was presented Off-Broadway at the Joseph Papp Public Theater in December 1979, for 6 performances. Directed by A. J. Antoon the play starred Ron Rifkin as Cal, Kathy Bates as Herrick Simmons and Dianne Wiest as Elizabeth Barrow Colt. Wiest won the 1980 Clarence Derwent Award and Obie Award, Performance and Antoon won the Obie Award, Direction. The play next ran at the Kennedy Center later in December 1979.

== Overview ==
The play takes place in a new restaurant on the New Jersey shore. The restaurant, "The Golden Carousel", is small but elegant. The owners are worried about having to repay the money they borrowed to convert the townhouse into a restaurant. The evening's guests are three groups, each with their own eccentricities and problems. Cal and Ellen settle their differences and have a communal dinner at the end of the evening.

=== Characters ===
- Neurotic short story writer - Elizabeth Barrow Colson
- Publisher - David Osslow
- Couple - Hannah and Paul Galt
- Friends - Herrick Simmons, Nessa Vox and Tony Stassio
- Restaurant owners - Ellen (also the chef) and Cal

=== The food ===
In an author's note, Howe wrote: "...it's crucial to remember the play is about appetite. It's what the food represents that makes it mouth-watering, not its myriad ingredients."

In some productions, the cast prepares and eats the food. For example, in the MRT Productions (Chicago) presentation, the reviewer noted: "A meticulously detailed set, including actual food prepared and savored onstage with mouthwatering sensuality, also contributes to 'The Art of Dining'. " In a production by the Key City Public Theatre at the Key City Playhouse, Port Townsend, Washington, the reviewer described the stage activity: "... the food is either prepared on set by Steurer [Ellen] — a restaurateur in her other life — and Nollette [Cal], or delivered steaming haute and fragrant from the saute pans of chef Dan Kithcart of nearby Alchemy Bistro and Wine Bar. Good for the actors, who actually get to eat all that actual cooking." In the Community Theatre production at the Imperial Centre, Rocky Mount, North Carolina, the reviewer wrote: "Adding to the effect, the actors cook and eat real food on stage with a real working kitchen." In a production at the Smith Theatre, Howard Community College, Maryland, the reviewer observed that "The offbeat production -- sizzling with dual conversations, physical humor and clever staging -- presented several obstacles for the cast and crew. To lend a flavor of authenticity, gourmet food from a gourmet restaurant will be imported for each show... The restaurant's chef, Glenn Spindler, also gave two of the actors a crash course on slicing and serving, and preparing the dessert -- flaming crepes suzette... But to perfect the art of dining, the actors first had to perfect the art of eating. 'They've been practicing on bread and Jell-O,' the director said."

== Themes ==
The play explores themes which question the nature of dining; the "art" of dining, as constructed by traditions of etiquette and social pressures and expectations surrounding the idea that one has to entertain during mealtimes, eat and maneuver utensils with precision, clarity, sophistication and grace; all to impress whoever may be (and usually is) watching. Dining, generally speaking, is considered to be an event which brings people, both friends and family, together. It is thought of as a social time when events of the day are discussed; though often, it is a time when darker things surface (such as money problems). However, as shown in Tina Howe's play, the more gullible and weak-minded people have greater potential to be affected by these pressures and expectations. Each of the characters in the play have been affected and, in a variety of ways, live with problems ranging from eating and body image disorders to personality and mental disorders.

However, none of the characters have been more affected than Elizabeth Barrow Colt. Elizabeth, after suffering childhood traumas of her mother's depression and attempts at suicide (beginning, progressing and ending with food and cooking) has left her with neurosis (a mild personality disorder in which obsessive thoughts and/or compulsive acts and feelings of anxiety are displayed) and an irrational fear of food. Already, Elizabeth had been a sensitive child, with issues surrounding mealtimes. Pressures to entertain during dinner evidently took the focus away from the food, fortunately, as her parents' eating habits turned her stomach. Constantly spitting food into her napkin, Elizabeth lived in an uncomfortable and stressful environment. However, this proves merely to be the root of Elizabeth's condition. It is assumed that Elizabeth is normal in every other aspect of her life. However, throughout the course of the play, it becomes clear that she does not cope well in social situations, especially those involving food and dining. Her issues are highlighted in a number of speeches, loudly and intensely given, exposing the disturbing and personal events of her past. The audience sees how this has left an individual hunger for normality, balance, comfort, the ability to eat in peace, and in doing so, enjoy food with great thoughts.

== Sources ==
- The Actor's Book Of Contemporary Stage Monologues Edited by Nina Shengold 1987, USA
- Foster, Verna A. (ed), Dramatic Revisions of Myths, Fairy Tales and Legends: Essays on Recent Plays, McFarland, 2012, ISBN 0786465123, p. 77
