= Quincy Howe =

American journalist (1900–1977)

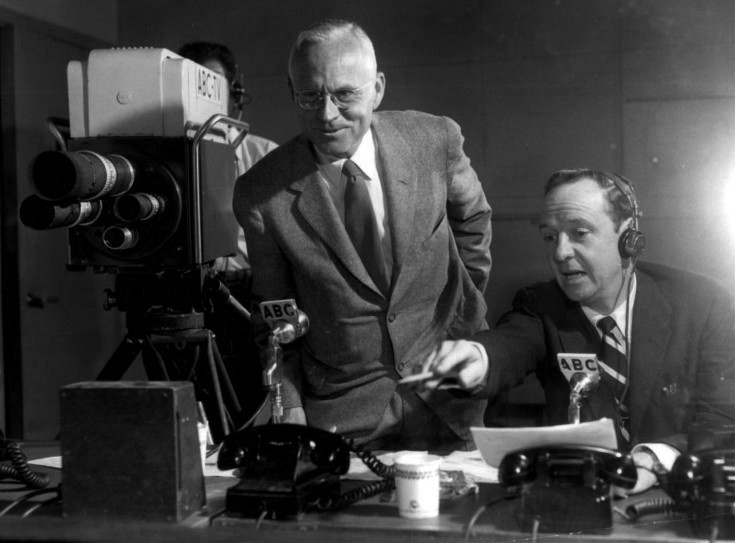
- Howe (left) with fellow journalist John Daly providing commentary for ABC's 1952 presidential convention coverage.
- Born: August 17, 1900; Boston, Massachusetts, U.S.
- Died: February 17, 1977 (aged 76); New York City, U.S.
- Education: Harvard University
- Occupation: Broadcast journalist
- Father: Mark Anthony De Wolfe Howe, Jr.
- Relatives: Helen Howe (sister)

Quincy Howe (August 17, 1900 – February 17, 1977) was an American journalist, best known for his CBS radio broadcasts during World War II. His daughter was playwright Tina Howe.

== Biography ==
Born in Boston, Massachusetts, Quincy Howe was the son of Mark Anthony De Wolfe Howe; his sister was Helen Howe. He was a 1921 graduate of Harvard University.

Howe served as director of the American Civil Liberties Union before the Second World War, and as chief editor at Simon & Schuster from 1935 to 1942. He once said that life began for him in 1939, when he began to broadcast news and commentary on WQXR radio in New York City.

Howe joined CBS in June 1942, doing the opening news summary on the radio network's The World Today newscast.

He left CBS in 1947 to join ABC. In the fall of 1955, he hosted four episodes of the 26-week prime time series Medical Horizons on ABC before he was replaced in that capacity by Don Goddard.

In the early 1950s, Howe was an associate professor of journalism and communications at the University of Illinois.

Howe moderated the first ever televised presidential primary debate in 1956, between Democratic candidates Adlai Stevenson and Estes Kefauver. He also moderated the fourth and final Kennedy/Nixon debate on October 21, 1960, which had the topic of foreign affairs. Howe retired from broadcasting in 1974. He died from cancer of the larynx.

== Bibliography ==
- World Diary: 1929–34 (1934)
- England Expects Every American to Do His Duty (1937)
- World History of Our Own Times. (trilogy, 1949)
- Ashes of Victory (1972)
