= The Simple Life of Noah Dearborn =

- Home video cover art
- Written by: Sterling Anderson
- Directed by: Gregg Champion
- Starring: Sidney Poitier; Mary-Louise Parker; Dianne Wiest; George Newbern
- Composer: Joseph Conlan
- Country of origin: United States
- Original language: English

Production
- Producer: Trimark Pictures
- Running time: 87 min

Original release
- Network: CBS
- Release: May 9, 1999

The Simple Life of Noah Dearborn, is a 1999 American television film aired on May 9, 1999 on CBS. It stars Sidney Poitier as the eponymous rural Georgia skilled carpenter, who lives alone without electricity and seems frozen in time. George Newbern played a developer trying to force Dearborn off his land. He tries to enlist the help of his psychologist girlfriend (Mary-Louise Parker), a move which backfires badly. The developer tries to have Dearborn declared mentally incompetent; the effort fails, mostly because of the efforts of the woman, who realizes why Dearborn is held in esteem by his neighbors. For her performance, Dianne Wiest was nominated for a Primetime Emmy Award for Outstanding Supporting Actress - Miniseries or a Movie.
