= A. J. Antoon =

American theatre director (1944–1992)

- Born: Alfred Joseph Antoon Jr. December 7, 1944; Methuen, Massachusetts, U.S.
- Died: January 22, 1992 (aged 47); New York City, New York, U.S.
- Education: Shadowbrook Jesuit Seminary; Boston University (BA); Yale University
- Occupation: Director
- Years active: 1971–1991
- Partner: Peter Perez

A. J. Antoon (December 7, 1944 – January 22, 1992) was an American theatre director. He attended the Yale School of Drama. Beginning in 1971, Antoon directed numerous plays at the New York Shakespeare Festival over a period of nearly 20 years. In 1973, Antoon became one of the few directors to have been nominated for two Tony Awards in the same category in the same year. In addition to winning the Tony Award with one of his nominations, Antoon was also the winner of a Drama Desk Award, a New York Drama Critics' Circle Award, and an Obie Award. His career lasted until 1991; he died less than a year later from AIDS-related lymphoma.

== Biography ==
Alfred Joseph Antoon was born in Methuen, Massachusetts, on December 7, 1944. His parents were Alfred J. Antoon, Sr. and Josephine Antoon (née Saba). Antoon attended Lawrence Central Catholic High School in nearby Lawrence, Massachusetts. After high school he studied for priesthood at the Shadowbrook Jesuit seminary in Lenox, Massachusetts, while also attending Boston College. He later dropped out from the seminary and earned his bachelor's degree from Boston College in 1968. He went on to attend the Yale School of Drama for a year and a half before leaving to begin his work in professional theatre. Antoon died at the age of 47 from AIDS-related lymphoma on January 22, 1992, at the NYU Medical Center. After his death, a collection of Antoon's papers and correspondence was donated to Billy Rose Theatre Collection.

== Career ==
Antoon directed his first professional production, Story Theatre, at St. Clement's Church Theatre in 1971. In that same year, Antoon presented Subject to Fits, a play written by his Yale friend Robert Montgomery, to Joseph Papp, founder of the New York Shakespeare Festival. Papp gave Antoon the directing job, and the play opened on February 14, 1971, at the Public Theater. This was the first of many productions he would direct for the New York Shakespeare Festival over a career lasting 20 years. Subject to Fits was successful, and it moved to London where it was staged by the Royal Shakespeare Company at The Place. Antoon continued his success with the New York Shakespeare Festival in 1971 with his direction of Tale of Cymbeline.

In 1972, Antoon directed both the off-Broadway and Broadway debut productions of That Championship Season as well as a Broadway production of Shakespeare's Much Ado About Nothing. Antoon was nominated for a Tony Award for Best Direction of a Play for both productions and won with That Championship Season. Since then, no director was nominated for two Tony awards in the same category until Matthew Warchus in 2009. That Championship Season also won the 1972 Drama Desk Award for Outstanding Director and the 1972 New York Drama Critics' Circle Award for Best Play. Antoon's production of Much Ado About Nothing was also successful; he directed a television adaptation of it in 1973. Following his success with these two productions, Antoon was awarded an honorary doctorate from his alma mater, Boston College.

Antoon went on to direct numerous original Broadway productions, including The Good Doctor, The Effect of Gamma Rays on Man-in-the-Moon Marigolds, and Sherlock's Last Case. In 1975, Antoon directed a production of Trelawny of the 'Wells' featuring the Broadway debuts of Meryl Streep and Mandy Patinkin. In 1979, Antoon directed a production of The Art of Dining for which he won an Obie Award for Best Direction. In 1984, Antoon directed a production of The Rink with Liza Minnelli and Chita Rivera for which he was nominated for a Drama Desk Award. Antoon's last production with the New York Shakespeare Festival was a 1990 Wild West-themed production of The Taming of the Shrew in Central Park. His final production came shortly thereafter with Song of Singapore in 1991. Throughout his career he relied on and worked closely with Elizabeth McGonagle, who was first an assistant and then assistant director on most of his productions.
