= Coastal Disturbances =

Play by Tina Howe

- Written by: Tina Howe

Premiere
- Date: November 19, 1986
- Place: McGinn/Cazale Theatre
- Directed by: Carole Rothman

Coastal Disturbances is a play by Tina Howe, which premiered Off-Broadway in 1986 and transferred to Broadway. It received a Tony Award nomination as Best Play. The play takes place on a beach in Massachusetts.

== Background ==
Howe said that she "really wanted to write a love story... I think I've gone to great pains to bury my romantic and sexual side, and that I've been exploring my fanciful, artistic side. I thought it was time to try to face those deeper longings." Coastal Disturbances focuses on lovers trying to come to terms with each other.

== Production history ==
The play opened Off-Broadway in a Second Stage Theatre production at the McGinn-Cazale Theatre on November 19, 1986, and ran for 45 performances. Directed by Carole Rothman, the cast featured Annette Bening (Holly Dancer), Timothy Daly (Leo Hart) and Rosemary Murphy (M. J. Adams). It transferred to Broadway at the Circle in the Square Theatre on February 14, 1987, in previews, opening on March 4, 1987, and closing on January 3, 1988, after 350 performances and 20 previews. The Off-Broadway director and most of the cast, including Bening and Daly, were in the Broadway production.

The play was produced at the Berkshire Theatre Festival, Stockbridge, Massachusetts in July 2006, with Jeremy Davidson as Leo Hart, Annie Parisse as Holly Dancer and Patricia Conolly as M.J. Adams.

On October 10, 2020, a livestream reading of the play was held to benefit The Actors Fund. Annette Bening directed and reprised her role as Holly in the livestream as did Tim Daly and most of the original Broadway cast. Due to the deaths of Rosemary Murphy and Addison Powell (Hamilton Adams), their roles were portrayed in the livestream by Ed Begley Jr. and Mary Kay Place.

== Plot ==
Artist M.J. Adams, a senior, paints at a private beach on the north shore of Massachusetts. At the end of August, her niece, Holly Dancer, a photographer, has come for a visit to escape her troubled life—both private and work. The young attractive lifeguard Leo Hart is attracted to Holly, but he is just getting over a failed romance. Another visitor to the beach, Ariel Took, now divorced and bitter, brings her young son Winston to play on the beach, but she cannot get away from her own sadness. Also visiting is Faith, Ariel's Wellesley College roommate, who is pregnant, and who has brought along her adopted daughter Miranda. After Holly and Leo start a romance, Andre Sor, Holly's real romantic interest, arrives. Holly leaves to return to her New York home, and, although she has told Leo that she cannot continue their romance, she gives him her phone number. Finally, M.J. Adams and her husband Dr. Hamilton “Hammy” Adams come to the beach together, comfortable in their long relationship.

== Characters ==
Leo Hart
The 28-year-old lifeguard of a small, private beach on Massachusetts' North Shore. He is generally friendly and helpful to the patrons, especially Holly, who he takes a liking to during the course of the play. Originally played by Tim Daly.
Holly Dancer
The play's protagonist. A 24-year-old photographer who came from New York to visit her aunt in Massachusetts. Originally played by Annette Bening.
Faith Bigelow
A beach regular who is old friends with Holly. She is five months pregnant. Originally played by Heather MacRae.
Miranda Bigelow
Faith's 7-year-old, rambunctious, adopted daughter. Originally played by Angela Goethals.
Ariel Took
A friend of Faith's. Originally played by Jean DeBaer.
Winston Took
Ariel's 8-year-old son and Miranda's playmate . Originally played by Jonas Abry.
Dr. Hamilton Adams
A retired eye surgeon who comes to the beach often with his wife. Originally played by Addison Powell.
M.J. Adams
Dr. Adam's wife who often doubts her own painting ability and her husband's fascination with the beach. Originally played by Rosemary Murphy.
Andre Sor
A middle-aged colleague of Holly's from the New York art world who unexpectedly makes an appearance at the beach. Originally played by Ronald Guttman.

== Critical response ==
In his review in The New York Times, Frank Rich wrote: "In his brilliant lighting...the designer Dennis Parichy has captured the entire spectrum of weather known to habitues of New England beaches in August. As written by Ms. Howe and acted by one of the finer casts in New York, the emotional cloudbursts, no less than the meteorological, can take the breath away."

In reviewing the 2006 Berkshire Theatre Festival production, the CurtainUp reviewer wrote: "More than anything 'Coastal Disturbances' is a love story, but it too comes with sharp-edged shards. Like all of Howe's work, the play's charm stems from its quirky characters... Told as a series of interwoven vignettes that end more as a fadeout than a neatly tied-up beginning, middle and end story, the ten scenes nevertheless allow you get to know all the characters."

== Awards and nominations ==
Tony Awards 1987

- Best Play (nominee)
- Director (Play) - Carole Rothman (nominee)
- Featured Actress (Play) - Annette Bening (nominee)

Theatre World Award 1987

- Annette Bening (winner)
- Timothy Daly (winner)

Drama Desk Award 1987

- Outstanding Director of a Play (nominee)
- Outstanding Lighting Design, Dennis Parichy (nominee)
