= Helen Howe =

American novelist, biographer and monologist

- Born: Helen Huntington Howe; January 11, 1905
- Died: February 1, 1975 (aged 70)
- Education: Radcliffe College

Helen Huntington Howe Allen (née Howe; January 11, 1905 – February 1, 1975) was an American novelist, biographer and monologist.

== Early life and education ==
Helen Huntington Howe was born to Mark Antony DeWolfe Howe and Fanny Huntington (Quincy) Howe on January 11, 1905. Her father was an author and biographer, and her mother was known as an essayist and author. Her mother was from a long line of Quincys in Boston, stretching back through her great-great-great-grandfather Josiah Quincy Jr. Her older brother Quincy became a writer, editor and radio commentator. Her younger brother Mark Antony DeWolfe Howe became a law professor at Harvard University and a biographer.

Howe was educated in private schools in Boston including Milton Academy, where she graduated in 1922. She attended Radcliffe College for a year. She also attended the Theatre Guild School in New York. Howe had a skill in mimicry and discovered she enjoyed writing her own character sketches to perform.

== Career ==
She had a career as a monologist for over fifteen years, with shows across America. She gave several performances in The White House. In 1936 she took her show to both the Arts Theatre and Mercury Theater in London.

Howe also wrote books exploring the kinds of characters she portrayed in her sketches. Her first novel was published in 1943. She began the second half of her career more as a novelist.

== Personal life ==
Howe married Reginald Allen, who had worked as a curator of the Gilbert and Sullivan Collection in the Pierpont Morgan Library. She lived in New York, on Fifth Avenue.

Howe died in 1975. Her service was at the Cathedral Church of St. John the Divine and her grave is in Mount Wollaston Cemetery, Quincy, Massachusetts. Her papers are archived in Harvard.

== Bibliography ==
- The whole heart, 1943
- We happy few, 1946
- The circle of the day, 1950
- The success, 1956
- The fires of autumn, 1959
- The gentle Americans, 1864-1960 : biography of a breed, 1965
- Wheels: biographical sketch of John Brooks Wheelwright, 1966
