= List of lighting designers =

The following is a list of notable lighting designers:

== List ==
- Andreas Schulz
- Kevin Adams
- Christopher Akerlind
- Neil Austin
- Peter Barnes (lighting designer)
- Brian Sidney Bembridge
- Ken Billington
- Howell Binkley
- Marc Brickman
- Andrew Bridge
- Isabella Byrd
- Filippo Cannata
- Paule Constable
- Hervé Descottes
- Johnny Dodd
- Kevin Dreyer
- Andrew Elias
- Peggy Eisenhauer
- Beverly Emmons
- Jules Fisher
- Paul Gallo
- Paul Gregory
- David Hersey
- Gilbert Vaughn Hemsley, Jr.
- Donald Holder
- Mark Howett
- Allen Lee Hughes
- James F. Ingalls
- Shiu-Kay Kan
- Natasha Katz
- Mikki Kunttu
- Chris Kuroda
- Luc Lafortune
- Tim Lutkin
- Brian MacDevitt
- Ingo Maurer
- Stanley McCandless
- Tharon Musser
- Billy Name
- Sergio Orozco
- Chris Parry
- Dave Parry
- Kenneth Posner
- Maurizio Rossi
- Tim Routledge
- Tapas Sen (1924–2006)
- George Sexton
- Jonathan Smeeton
- Sally Storey
- Clifton Taylor
- Jennifer Tipton
- Rogier van der Heide
- Hugh Vanstone
- Scott Warner
- Lee Watson
- Robert Wierzel
- Willie Williams
- Cosmo Wilson
- Patrick Woodroofe
- Heather Gilbert
- Aiden Fink

== Pioneers ==
- Adolphe Appia
- Imero Fiorentino
- Stanley McCandless
- Tharon Musser
- Jean Rosenthal
- Tom Skelton
