= 1998 Florida Treasurer election =

1998 election in Florida

- November 3, 1998
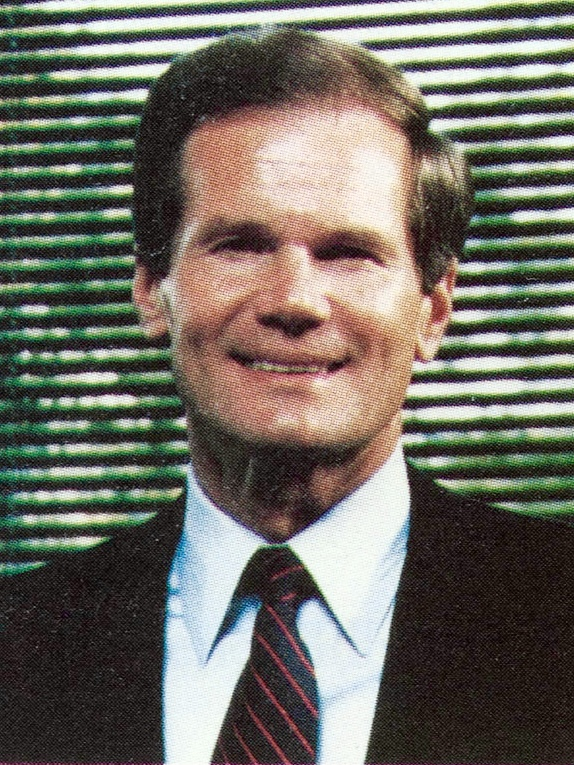

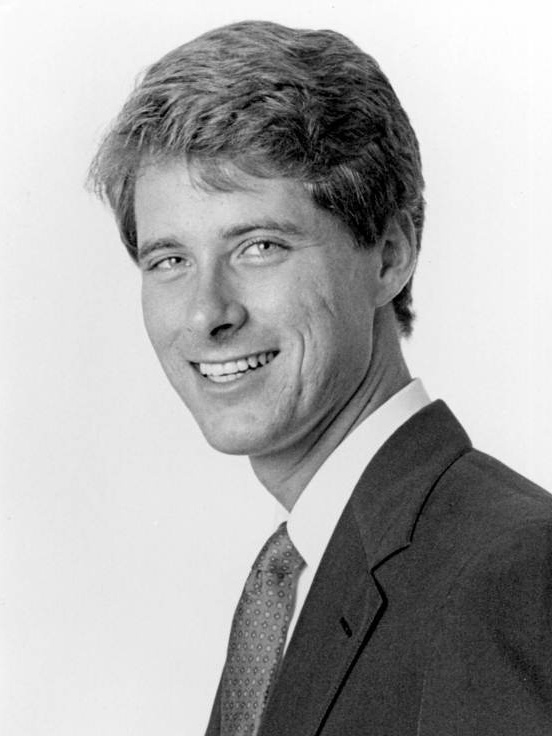
Nominee	Bill Nelson	Tim Ireland
Party	Democratic	Republican
Popular vote	2,195,283	1,687,712
Percentage	56.54%	43.46%
- Nelson: 50–60% 60–70% 70–80% Ireland: 50–60% 60–70%
Treasurer before election
Bill Nelson
Democratic
Elected Treasurer
Bill Nelson
Democratic

The 1998 Florida Treasurer election was held on November 3, 1998, to elect the Treasurer, Insurance Commissioner and Fire Marshal of Florida. Primary elections were held on September 1, 1998. Democratic incumbent Bill Nelson ran for a second term, facing a rematch with Republican Florida State House Representative Tim Ireland, whom Nelson had previously narrowly defeated in the 1994 election.

Nelson won the election by 13 percentage points over Ireland, a much wider victory than the narrow 3 percentage point victory he had won four years earlier. Nelson would not serve out a second full term as treasurer, as he would go on to resign in 2001 to take office after being elected to the United States Senate.

This is the last election to be held for the office of Florida Treasurer, as the position would be abolished in 2003 and succeeded by the office of Chief Financial Officer of Florida.

== Democratic primary ==
Nelson was unopposed in the primary so his name did not appear on the primary ballot.

== Republican primary ==
=== Candidates ===
- Tim Ireland, Florida State House Representative (1986–1994), and 1994 Republican nominee for Florida Treasurer
- Joseph Smith, chiropractic doctor and perennial candidate

=== Campaign ===
Ireland easily won the Republican primary over perennial candidate Joseph Smith.

=== Results ===
Republican primary results
Party	Candidate	Votes	%
Republican	Tim Ireland	423,277	77.11%
Republican	Joseph Smith	125,741	22.89%
Total votes		549,018	100.0%

== General election ==
=== Candidates ===
- Bill Nelson, incumbent Florida Treasurer (1995–2001)
- Tim Ireland, Florida State House Representative (1986–1994), and 1994 Republican nominee for Florida Treasurer

=== Results ===
1998 Florida Treasurer election results
Party	Candidate	Votes	%	±%
Democratic	Bill Nelson	2,195,283	56.54%	+4.84
Republican	Tim Ireland	1,687,712	43.46%	−4.82
Total votes		3,882,995	100.00%	
Democratic hold				
