= Ralph Livingston =

American politician (born 1938)

Member of the Florida House of Representatives from the 75th district
- In office November 8, 1994 – November 3, 1998
- Preceded by: Tim Ireland
- Succeeded by: Carole Green

Personal details
- Born: October 22, 1938 (age 87) Richmond, Indiana
- Party: Republican
- Spouse: Barbara "Pixie" Yingling
- Children: 2
- Education: Purdue University (B.S.M.E.); Xavier University
- Occupation: Businessman

Ralph Livingston (born October 22, 1938) is a Republican politician from Florida who served as a member of the Florida House of Representatives from the 75th district from 1994 to 1998.

== Early life ==
Livingston was born in Richmond, Indiana, in 1938, and attended Purdue University, graduating with his bachelor's degree in mechanical engineering in 1962. He then attended Xavier University and took business courses. He moved to Fort Myers, Florida, in 1978, and opened The Extra Closet, a mini-storage business. He served on the Lee County Planning and Zoning Commission.

In 1988, Livingston ran for the Lee County Commission from the 3rd district. He placed third in the Republican primary, receiving 12 percent of the vote to Carol Lamb's 43 percent and Phil McCorkle's 25 percent.

== Florida House of Representatives ==
Following redistricting in 1992, Livingston ran for the Florida House of Representatives from the 75th district, challenging incumbent State Representative Tim Ireland in the Republican primary. Ireland won renomination by a wide margin, receiving 66 percent of the vote to Livingston's 26 percent and Ross Peeler's 8 percent.

Ireland retired in 1994 to run for State Treasurer, and Livingston ran to succeed him. He ran against attorney Lou Sisson and Chris Dudley, the son of State Senator Fred Dudley, in the Republican primary. Though Dudley was viewed as the frontrunner,

Livingston placed first in the primary, winning 39 percent of the vote, and advanced to a runoff with Dudley, who placed second with 35 percent. Livingston defeated Dudley by a wide margin, winning 62 percent of the vote to Dudley's 38 percent. No other candidates filed in the race, and Livingston won the general election unopposed.

In 1996, Livingston was elected to a second term unopposed.

== 1998 State Senate campaign ==
State Senator Fred Dudley ran for Attorney General in 1998, and resigned from the state senate, effective with the 1998 election, as required by the state's resign-to-run law, triggering a special election for the remaining two years of his term. Livingston ran to succeed Dudley, and faced fellow State Representative Burt Saunders in the Republican primary.

Following a close campaign, Saunders led Livingston by 27 votes on election night. An automatic recount confirmed Saunders's victory over Livingston by 34 votes, and Livingston conceded the election.

== 2002 State Senate campaign ==
In 2002, Saunders was exploring a run for Congress in the event that Republican Congressman Porter Goss retired, and Livingston announced that he would run to succeed Saunders. Goss ultimately sought another term, but Livingston continued his campaign in the newly created 27th district, which stretched from Palm Beach County to Lee County. In the Republican primary, he ran against former State Senator Franklin B. Mann, State Representative Sharon Merchant, Eric Goldberg, and Joseph Lee. Livingston ultimately lost, receiving 24 percent of the vote to Mann's 36 percent and Merchant's 26 percent.

== 2004 State House campaign ==
When State Representative Carole Green, who succeeded Livingston in the House, ran for Congress in 2004, Livingston ran to succeed her in the 75th district. He faced engineering consultant Trudi Williams in the Republican primary, and lost, winning 39 percent of the vote to her 48 percent.
