= Timothy Ireland =

Timothy or Tim Ireland may refer to:

- Tim Ireland (baseball) (born 1953), American former professional baseball player
- Tim Ireland (politician) (born 1958), American politician from Florida
