= Domestic policy =

Politics mostly concerning issues within a country

Domestic policy, also known as internal policy, is a type of public policy overseeing administrative decisions that are directly related to all issues and activity within a state's borders. Sometimes also called social policy, it differs from foreign policy, which refers to the ways a government advances its interests in external politics. Domestic policy covers a wide range of areas, including business, education, energy, healthcare, law enforcement, money and taxes, natural resources, social welfare, and personal rights and freedoms.

== Implementation ==
The form of government of any particular state largely determines how its domestic policy is formed and implemented. Under authoritarian governments, a ruling group may pursue its domestic policy goals without the input or consent of the people being governed. But in parliamentary democratic societies, the will of citizens has a much greater influence.

In a democracy, the formal design of domestic policy is chiefly the responsibility of elected leaders, lawmaking bodies, and specialized government agencies. But a number of other factors also play a role in the process. Voters, for instance, determine which individuals and political parties have the power to determine policy. The mass media distribute, and opine, information about domestic issues and influence the beliefs and opinions of the people. Lobbyists, activist groups, and other organizations also work to influence policy through a variety of methods. Such methods may include monetary donations, promises of support, advertising campaigns, or demonstrations and protests.

The effectiveness of domestic policy depends on the government bureaucracy (system of agencies) that puts laws and programs into action. In some cases, bureaucracies act slowly or inefficiently, or fail to apply policies as they were originally intended. Domestic policy may also face challenges in the courts. In many countries, courts have the power of judicial review, which allows its judges to strike down any legislative or executive action that they find in violation of the policy's constitution.

== Areas ==
=== Cultural policy ===
Cultural policy pertains to the arts and creative endeavors of a government or its citizens. A state's cultural policy is used to "channel both aesthetic creativity and collective ways of life" through a bureaucratic process. Cultural policy defines many of the fundamental aspects of a nation's existence, such as the national language. These policies may be influential in forming a national identity, fostering civic responsibilities, and defining ethical behavior. Many countries have a ministry of culture that oversees the government's cultural policy. Arts policy, language policy, sports policy, and museum planning are all policy areas governed by cultural policy.

=== Economic policy ===
Economic policy pertains to a country's economy and treasury. Monetary policy governs the supply of money and interest rates in a state, while fiscal policy governs how the state raises funds and decides how they are spent. Developed nations typically have a central bank that regulates monetary policy semi-independently of political actors. Tax policy, regulation, monetary systems, corporate law, public works, competition law, incomes policy, food policy, energy policy, and natural resource management are all policy areas governed by economic policy.

=== Social policy ===
Social policy pertains to the well-being of society and the response to societal challenges. Civil and political rights, education policy, drug policy, health policy, housing policy, and public security are all policy areas governed by social policy.

== Bibliography ==
- Miller, Toby; Yudice, George (2002). Cultural Policy. SAGE. ISBN 1446232905.
