= North Hagerstown High School =

Location
- 1200 Pennsylvania Avenue; Hagerstown, Maryland 21742; United States; 39°39′45″N 77°42′59″W

Information
- Type: Public secondary
- Motto: Arete (Greek: ἀρετή) (Excellence of any kind)
- Opened: 1956; 70 years ago
- School district: Washington County Public Schools
- Principal: Michael Chilcutt
- Teaching staff: 82.00
- Grades: 9–12
- Enrollment: 1558 (2023–24)
- Student to teacher ratio: 19.00
- Colors: Red, White, and Black
- Mascot: Hubs
- Yearbook: The Heiskelite
- Website: North Hagerstown High School website

North Hagerstown High School is public high school located in Hagerstown, Maryland. The school is part of the Washington County Public Schools system. North Hagerstown High School is fully accredited by the Maryland State Department of Education. It is the only school in Washington County to offer the International Baccalaureate Program. The school's colors are red and white, with black as the accent color.

== Background ==
North Hagerstown High School opened in 1956 at the old Potomac Avenue location after the founding of South Hagerstown High School. The present location of the school on Pennsylvania Avenue was opened in 1958. The former mascot was the Little Heiskell; however, the mascot is now a Hub. North's mascot stems from the historical and geographical location of Hagerstown at the intersection of waterways, railroads, and interstate highways. Major highways intersect within the city, including Interstate 70 and Interstate 81. Just as these highways form the center or “Hub”, North Hagerstown describes its academic programs as central to students’ preparation for advanced education and vocations, enabling students to succeed. Hence, North is known as “The Hub of Better Learning.”

Recently, the school opened a brand-new athletic facility, Mike Callas Stadium, that features a synthetic grass field and the largest free-standing scoreboard in the state of Maryland. The stadium's grand opening was on November 3, 2006, when the Hubs defeated Catoctin High School, 49–36. The stadium features bricks that were collected by alumni of the now-demolished Hagerstown High School, which was located on Potomac Avenue between the years of 1927 and 1958.

== Notable alumni ==
- David Bitner, former member of the Florida House of Representatives
- Aaron Brooks, four-time NCAA Division I collegiate wrestling champion, Pennsylvania State University
- Albert Lee Kaiss, captain of the USS Missouri
- Cathy Parson, former professional basketball player and former Washington Mystics coach
- Bruce Poole, former member of the Maryland House of Delegates and chairman of the Maryland Democratic Party
- Anka Radakovich, author and columnist
- Shaun Ricker, professional wrestler under the ring name LA Knight
- Andrew A. Serafini, member of the Maryland House of Delegates
- George Sexton, lighting and museum designer

== Principals ==
David Reader (1998–2002)
Robert Myers (2003–2005)
Valerie Novak (2005–2012)
Duane McNairn (2012–2014)
Peggy Pugh (2014–2015)
James Aleshire (2015–2021)
Michael Chilcutt (2021–2026)
Robert Stike (2026–present)
