= Carole Green =

American politician

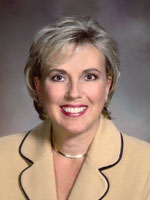

Secretary of the Florida Department of Elder Affairs
- In office March 1, 2005 – November 14, 2006
- Preceded by: Susan Tucker (interim)
- Succeeded by: Charles Corley (interim)

Member of the Florida House of Representatives from the 75th district
- In office November 3, 1998 – November 2, 2004
- Preceded by: Ralph Livingston
- Succeeded by: Trudi Williams

Personal details
- Born: February 14, 1952 (age 74) Vandalia, Illinois, U.S.
- Party: Republican
- Spouse: John Milton "Jack" Green
- Education: Mallinckrodt Institute of Radiation Oncology, Washington University in St. Louis
- Occupation: Health care administrator, radiation therapist

Carole Green (born February 14, 1952) is a Republican politician and health care administrator who served as a member of the Florida House of Representatives from the 75th District from 1998 to 2004, and as Secretary of the Florida Department of Elder Affairs from 2005 to 2006.

== Early life and career ==
Green was born in Vandalia, Illinois. She attended the Mallinckrodt Institute of Radiation Oncology at Washington University and worked as a radiation therapist. She moved to Florida in 1987, and began volunteering at the county hospital, and served as the chairwoman of the fundraising board at the county's children's hospital.

In 1994, Green ran for the Lee County Hospital Board of Directors from District 2, which included eastern Cape Coral and western Fort Myers. She challenged incumbent Board members Mark Abels and Frances Fenning for re-election, along with James English, a retired Episcopal priest. Green waged an active campaign, outraising her opponents and conducting door-to-door canvassing. Green and English ultimately prevailed, with Green receiving 36 percent of the vote to English's 23 percent, Fenning's 22 percent, and Abels's 19 percent.

== Florida House of Representatives ==
In 1998, Republican State Representative Ralph Livingston opted to run for the State Senate rather than seek re-election to the State House. Green ran to succeed him in the 75th district, which included Bonita Springs, southeastern Cape Coral, southern Fort Myers, and northern Collier County. She faced former Lee County Commissioner Donald Slisher and engineer Laurie Swanson in the Republican primary. Green won by a wide margin, receiving 56 percent of the vote to Slisher's 23 percent and Swanson's 21 percent, avoiding the need for a runoff election. Because no other candidates filed, Green won the general ele

Green ran for re-election in 2000 and faced only a write-in campaign from Mark Nerenstone, the former Chairman of the Lee County Democratic Party, who qualified for the ballot as "Mark" to avoid voter confusion over his last name. She won re-election easily, receiving 99.7 percent of the vote. In 2004, she was challenged by attorney Aaron O'Brien, the Libertarian nominee. She defeated O'Brien in a landslide, winning 82 percent of the vote to his 18 percent.

== 2004 congressional campaign ==
In 2003, Republican Congressman Porter Goss announced that he would not seek re-election in 2004, and Green announced that she would run to succeed him. In the Republican primary, Green faced former State Representative Connie Mack IV, who resigned his Fort Lauderdale-based seat and moved back to Lee County to run; Lee County Commissioner Andy Coy; and cardiologist Frank Schwerin.

Green was endorsed by The News-Press, which praised her as "a politician of solidly conservative principles but with an independent mind capable of grappling with complex issues," and as "a practical conservative, brainy and energetic." Mack, the son of former U.S. Senator Connie Mack III, received support from prominent national Republicans, and significantly outraised his opponents.

Mack narrowly defeated Green, winning 36 percent of the vote to her 32 percent, while Coy received 22 percent and Schwerin 10 percent.

== Secretary of Elder Affairs ==
On November 16, 2004, Governor Jeb Bush appointed Green as the Director of the Office of Long-Term Care Policy in the Florida Department of Elder Affairs. After Bush fired the Secretary of the Department, Terry White, for sexual harassment on January 5, 2005, Bush appointed Green as Secretary on March 1, 2005. Green served as Secretary pending Senate confirmation, which occurred several weeks later.

Following the election of Governor Charlie Crist in 2006, Green stepped down from office.
