= Danny Nix Jr. =

American real estate broker and state legislator

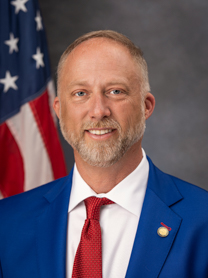

Member of the Florida House of Representatives from the 75th district
- Incumbent
- Assumed office November 5, 2024
- Preceded by: Michael J. Grant

Personal details
- Born: August 4, 1977 (age 48)
- Party: Republican

Danny Nix Jr. (born August 4, 1977) is an American real estate broker and state legislator in Florida. He was elected in 2024 and represents parts of southern Sarasota County and Charlotte County in the Florida House of Representatives. A Republican, he represents District 75.

He was born in Athens, Georgia. He grew up in Danielsville, Georgia. He moved to Florida in 2011 and lives in Port Charlotte, Florida. He attended Keiser University and Western Governors University.

He defeated Democrat Tony Dunbar in the 2024 election, succeeding term-limited Republican Michael J. Grant.
