= George Sexton =

American architect

George S. Sexton, III is an American designer, specializing in the areas of lighting design, museum design and museum planning services.

== Life ==
Sexton studied at Virginia Polytechnic Institute and State University from 1966, where he received his Bachelor of Architecture Degree in 1971. Upon graduation, Sexton began his work in architectural lighting design through his employment at Claude Engle, Lighting Consultant in Washington, DC. He continued his work in the field of lighting design by taking a position at the National Gallery of Art both designing and lighting exhibits. This early professional experience working in DC museums coupled with his modernist training as an architect have been the foundations of his approach to lighting and museum design. Further shaping experiences include working as Acting Keeper of the Sainsbury Centre for Visual Arts in Norwich, England, as well as the Head of the Design and Installation Department for the Fine Arts Museums of San Francisco at both the M.H. de Young Memorial Museum and the California Palace of the Legion of Honor.

In 1980, Sexton opened his own lighting and museum design firm, George Sexton Associates, based in Washington, DC, with satellite offices in Norwich, England and New York City.

=== Connection to Claude Engle ===
Trained in architecture at Virginia Polytechnic Institute, George Sexton found himself - after graduation, amid a recession in the early 1970s — seeking employment beyond architecture firms and found a position with lighting designer Claude Engle. Assigned to the east wing extension for the National Gallery of Art in Washington, D.C., which Engle was working on at the time, was what set Sexton on a course of museum work that has been the cornerstone of his professional lighting career.

=== Lighting philosophy ===
As referenced in an interview of George Sexton, "Design-wise, it's about listening to the client. In terms of lighting, we are of the school that you shouldn't notice our work; it should be transparent. ... Daylight is very important to the visitor's experience. Architects and lighting designers have a great comfort level in working with daylight. It is something that can be managed in a way that is consistent with museums, but when making that choice, there is a cost of controlling daylight that needs to be considered. ... Regarding technology impacting museum lighting, there's a whole area of lighting controls, particularly as they relate to conservation and energy issues. Interactive media as well. We need to be clever as designers and consider these other sources (i.e., the whole range of media generated light) as part of the lighting solution."

== Projects of note ==
Sexton has provided design services for an array of international and domestic clients, including the following:

Museums and galleries

- Museum of Modern Art, New York City
- Museum of Fine Arts, Boston
- Morse Museum of American Art, Winter Park Florida
- Star-Spangled Banner Exhibit, National Museum of American History Washington DC
- Victoria & Albert Museum, London UK
- Peabody Essex Museum, Salem Massachusetts
- Modern Art Museum of Fort Worth
- Sainsbury Centre for Visual Arts, University of East Anglia, Norwich, England
- Denver Art Museum
- Asian Art Museum of San Francisco
- National Gallery of Australia in Canberra, Australia
- Metropolitan Museum of American Art Henry R. Luce Center for the Study of American Art in New York City
- The Dali Museum, St. Petersburg Florida
- Geoffrey Diner Gallery, Masterpiece London (Awarded Stand of the Year 2013)]
- Dulwich Picture Gallery, London UK
- National Portrait Gallery, Washington DC

Public & Civic

- Flight 93 Memorial, Somerset Pennsylvania
- Vietnam Veterans Memorial, Washington, DC
- Parliament Houses in Canberra, Australia
- DiMenna Center for Classical Music, New York City
- Robert and Arlene Kogod Courtyard, Smithsonian Institution Washington DC
- National Dance Institute, New York City
- National Botanical Garden of Wales, Middleton Wales

Offices and mixed use

- The Shard, London UK
- BMCE Headquarters, Morocco
- Hearst Tower New York
- UBS Ultra High Net Worth Client Offices, Chicago Illinois and Atlanta Georgia
- 1100 First Street North East, Washington DC

Commercial

- Shore Club, Miami Beach
- Bryant Park Hotel, New York City
- The Modern, Museum of Modern Art, New York
- tangysweet, Washington DC
- The Hamilton, Washington DC

Retail

- Louis Vuitton stores worldwide
- Elie Tahari, Bal Harbour and Boca Raton Florida
- TAG Heuer, Peking Road Hong Kong

Residential

- Private residences worldwide
- Oyster House, Honest Point (Northern Neck) Virginia

Worship

- St. Joseph Cathedral, Sioux Falls South Dakota
- Herz Jesu Kirche, Munich Germany
- Shrine of Our Lady of Guadalupe, La Crosse Wisconsin
- Basilica of the Assumption, Baltimore Maryland

== Awards ==
French Pavilion, International Expo 2010, Shanghai China

- IIDA Section Guth Illumination Design Award, 2011

Museum of Fine Arts, Boston, Boston Massachusetts

- IIDA Section Guth Illumination Design Award, 2011

22 Bateman's Row, London UK

- RIBA London Building of the Year, 2010

1100 First Street NE, Washington DC

- A|L Light & Architecture Commendable Achievement in Interior Lighting, 2010
- E Edison Award of Excellence, 2009

Goucher College Athenaeum, Towson Maryland

- GE Edison Award of Merit, 2009

Lumen United Reformed Church, London UK

- IIDA Section Guth Illumination Design Award, 2009
- A|L Light & Architecture Commendable Achievement in Architectural Lighting, 2009

Star-Spangled Banner Exhibit, National Museum of American History, Washington DC

- IIDA Section Guth Illumination Design Award, 2009
- A|L Light & Architecture Special Citation for Achievement in Exhibition Lighting, 2009

Robert and Arlene Kogod Courtyard, Smithsonian Institution, Washington DC

- IIDA Guth Illumination Design Award, 2008

National Association of Realtors Headquarters, Washington DC

- U.S. Green Building Council LEED Award, Silver Rating, 2005
- Citation for Sustainable Design Award – Committee on the Environment Boston Society of Architects/AIA and Committee on the Environment of the AIA New York Chapter (in collaboration with Gund Partnership), 2004

Vietnam Veterans Memorial, Washington DC

- International Illumination Design Awards – Waterbury Capital Section Award, 2005

Louis Vuitton, Roppongi Hills, Japan

- GE Edison Award of Merit, 2004]

Cleveland Museum of Art Building Restoration, Cleveland Ohio

- Cleveland Restoration Society and Preservation Resource Center of Northeastern Ohio - Technical Achievement in Preservation Award (in collaboration with Vitetta), 2003

Modern Art Museum of Fort Worth, Fort Worth Texas

- IIDA Edwin F. Guth Memorial Award of Excellence, 2003
- IALD International Association of Lighting Designers Award of Merit, 2003
- IIDA Edwin F. Guth Memorial Award of Excellence for Interior Lighting Design, 2003
- IIDA Capitol Section Illumination Design Award, 2003
- IIDA Capitol Section Illumination Design Award of Merit – International Level, 2003

Milwaukee Art Museum, Milwaukee Wisconsin

- IIDA Paul Waterbury Award of Excellence for Outdoor Lighting Design
- GE Edison Award of Excellence, 2002
- IIDA Capitol Section Illumination Design Award, 2002

Herz Jesu Kirche (Heart of Jesus Church), Munich Germany

- IIDA Edwin F. Guth Memorial Award of Excellence for Interior Lighting Design, 2002
- IIDA Capitol Section Illumination Design Award, 2002
- IALD International Association of Lighting Designers Award of Merit, 2001
- GE Edison Award of Excellence, 2000

Denver Art Museum, Denver Colorado

- IESNA International Illumination Design Award of Merit, 1999

Henry Francis DuPont Winterthur Museum—McIntire Room, Wilmington Delaware

- IESNA Capital Section Illumination Design Award, 1998
