= Tyler Sirois =

American politician from Florida

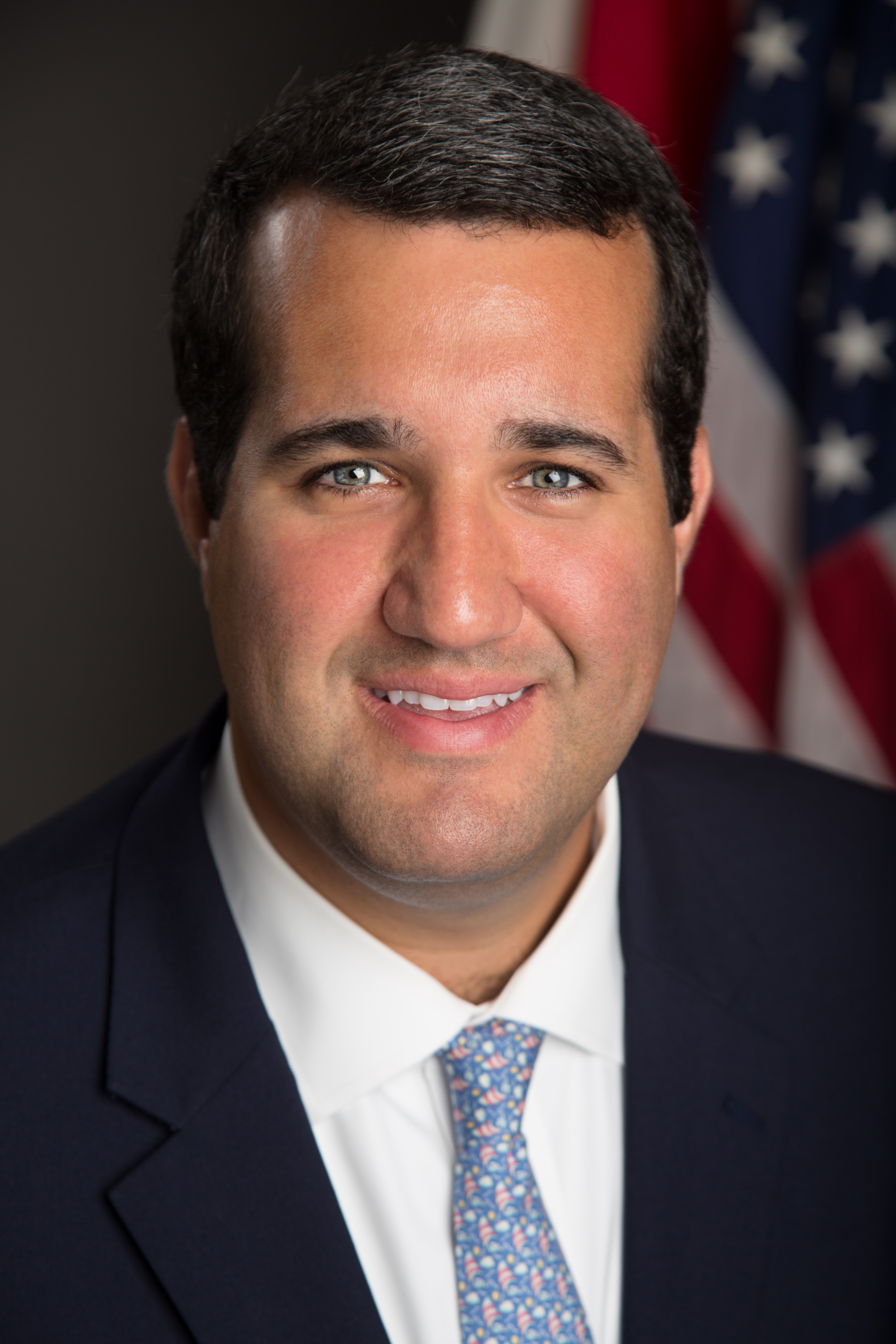

Majority Leader of the Florida House of Representatives
- Incumbent
- Assumed office November 18, 2024
- Preceded by: Michael J. Grant

Member of the Florida House of Representatives
- Incumbent
- Assumed office November 6, 2018
- Preceded by: Tom Goodson
- Constituency: 51st district (2018–2022); 31st district (2022–present)

Personal details
- Born: August 5, 1984 (age 41) Cape Canaveral, Florida, U.S.
- Party: Republican
- Spouse: Katy Sirois
- Education: Florida State University (BA)
- Website: Official website

Tyler Sirois is a Republican member of the Florida Legislature representing the state's 31st House District, which includes part of Brevard County on Florida's Space Coast.

He sponsored HB 3 in Florida in an effort to protect minors on the internet. This would force websites to required age verification or face hefty fines. In response to HB 3, Pornhub blocked access in Florida starting January 1, 2025.

== Early life and education ==
Sirois graduated from Florida State University in 2006, where he was a member of Tau Kappa Epsilon fraternity.

== Florida House of Representatives ==
Sirois defeated Henry Parrish in the August 28, 2018 Republican primary, winning 61.5% of the vote. In the November 6, 2018 general election, Sirois won 57.73% of the vote, defeating Democrat Mike Blake.

Sirois is a co-chairman of the Florida Legislature's Space Caucus, a group of members supporting the expansion of Florida's commercial aerospace industry.

Florida House of Representatives
Preceded by Michael J. Grant	Majority Leader of the Florida House of Representatives; 2024–present	Incumbent
