= Michael J. Grant =

American politician

Michael Grant
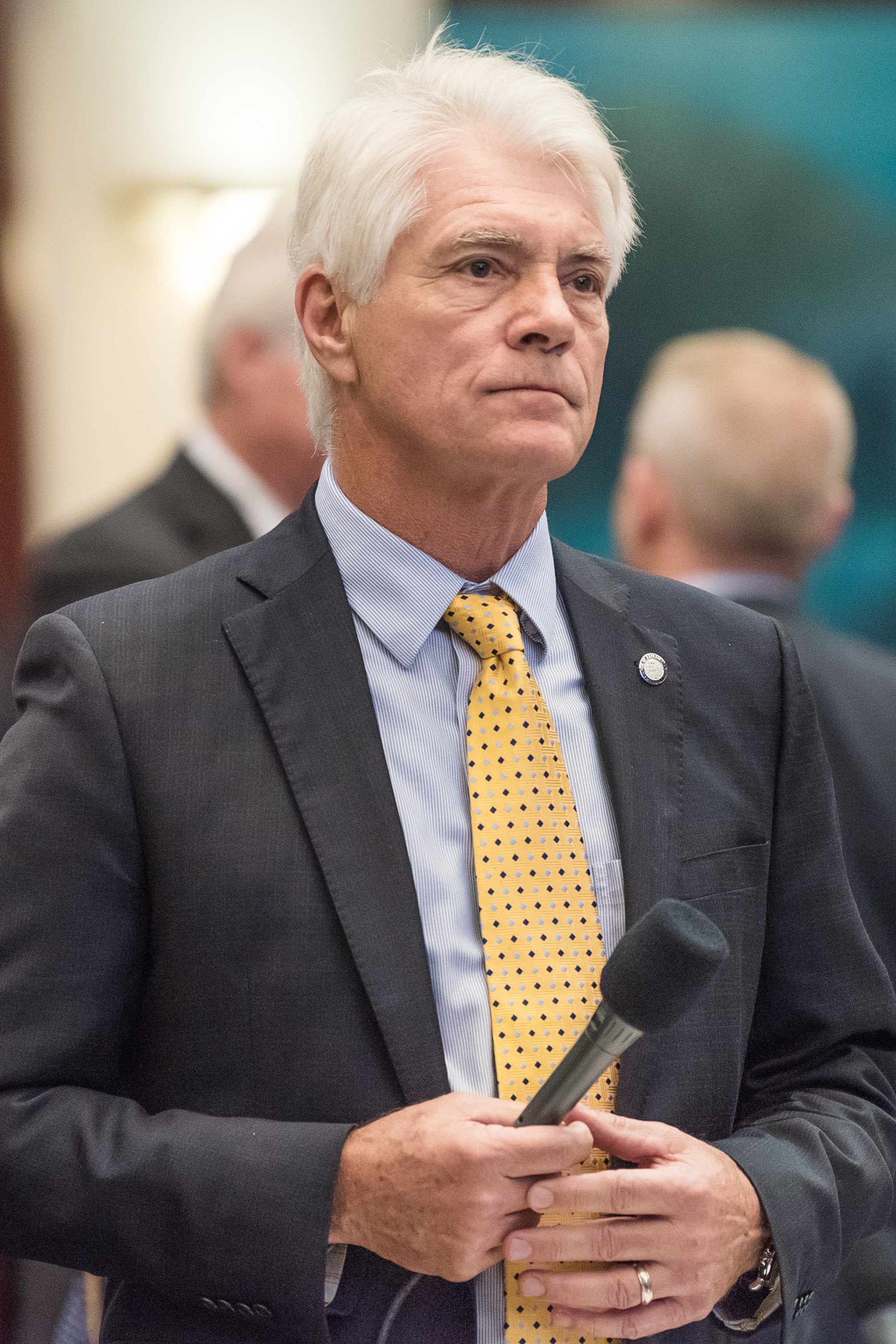

Majority Leader of the Florida House of Representatives
- In office November 16, 2020 – November 18, 2024
- Preceded by: Dane Eagle
- Succeeded by: Tyler Sirois

Member of the Florida House of Representatives
- In office November 8, 2016 – November 5, 2024
- Preceded by: Ken Roberson
- Succeeded by: Danny Nix
- Constituency: 75th district
- In office November 2, 2004 – November 4, 2008
- Preceded by: Jerald Paul
- Succeeded by: Ken Roberson
- Constituency: 71st district

Personal details
- Born: July 15, 1949 (age 77) Quincy, Massachusetts, U.S.
- Party: Republican
- Education: University of Massachusetts, Amherst (BA); Suffolk University (MBA)

Michael J. Grant (born July 15, 1949) is an American Republican politician who represented Florida's 75th district from 2016 to 2024. From 2004 to 2008, he represented the 71st district. He served as the Majority Leader of the Florida House of Representatives.

== Early life and career ==
Grant was born in Quincy, Massachusetts, and attended the University of Massachusetts Amherst, where he received his bachelor's degree in political science in 1972. He then attended Suffolk University, receiving his Master of Business Administration in 1980. Grant moved to the state of Florida in 1988, where he founded Grant Medical Transportation, which ended up acquiring Ambitrans, which became Southwest Florida's largest private ambulance company. He was appointed to the Charlotte County Airport Authority Commission by then-Governor Jeb Bush in 1998, and in 2000, he ran for re-election against pilot Frank Cvelbar. The race became a proxy battle over Airport Director Fred Watts' job performance and over whether the Charlotte County Airport should engage in non-aviation business agreements, which Grant favored. Grant ended up defeating Cvelbar in a landslide, winning re-election with 67% of the vote.

== Florida House of Representatives ==
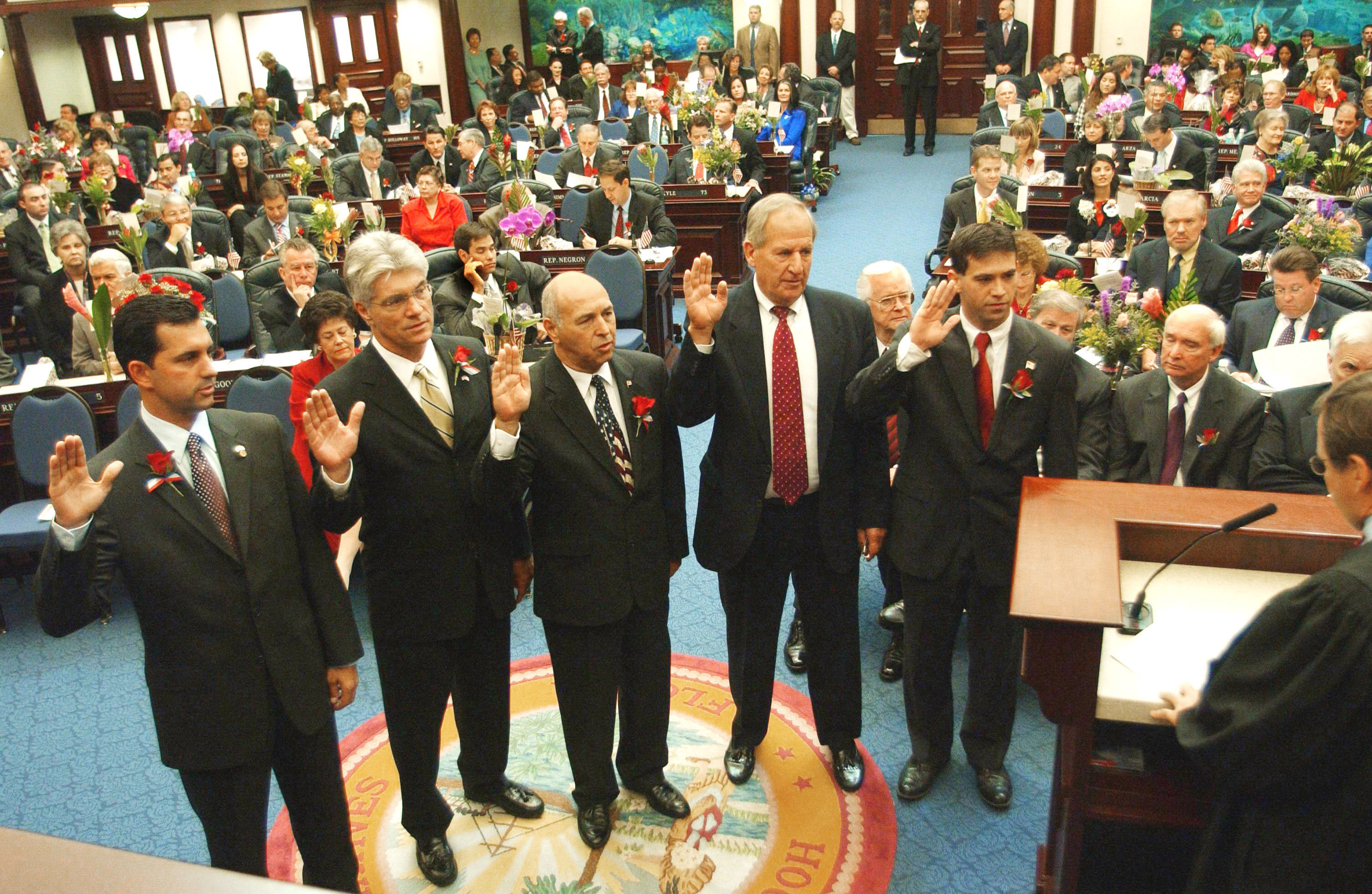
Grant being sworn in as a member of the Florida House of Representatives in 2004

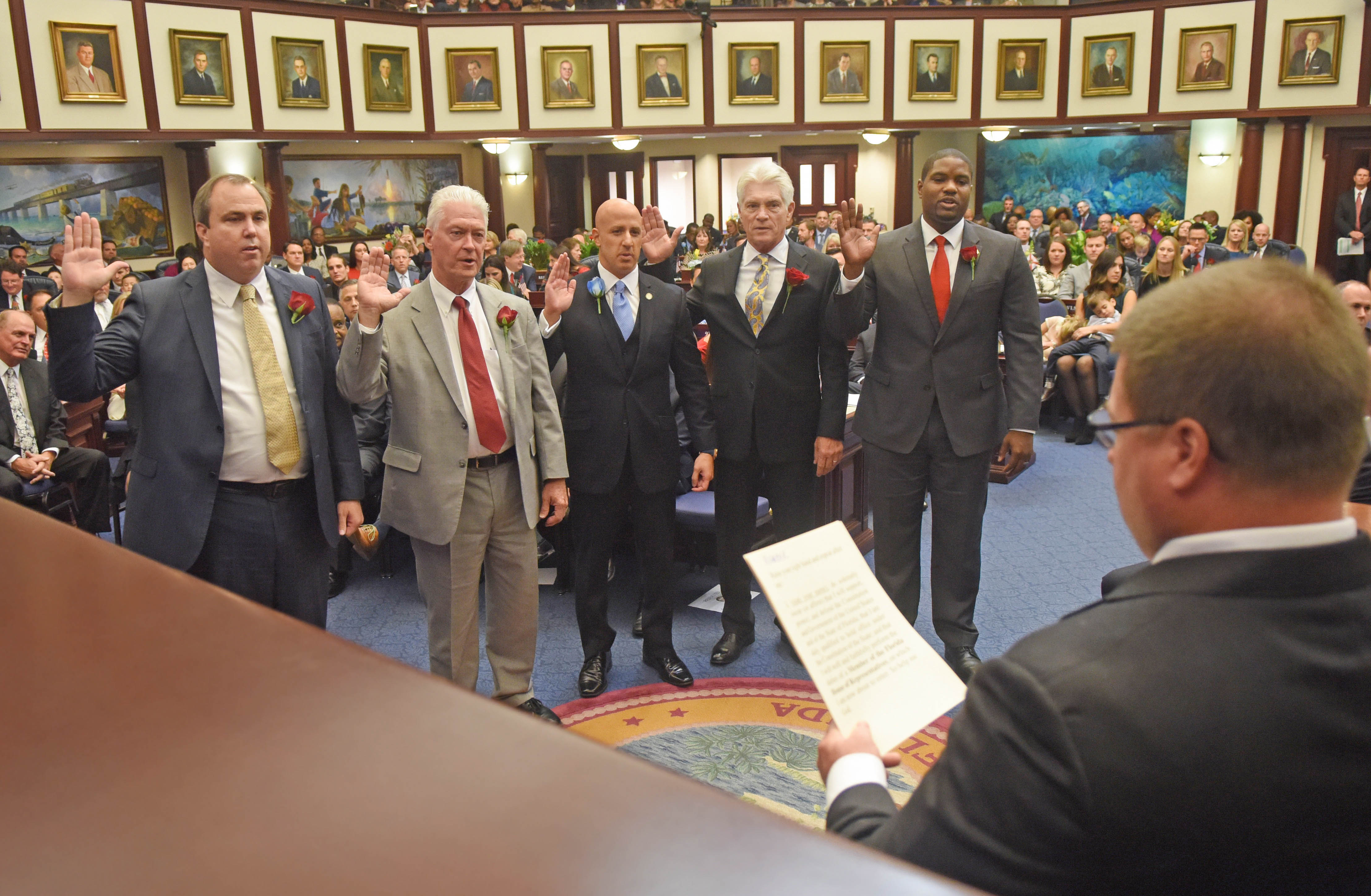
Grant being sworn in as a member of the Florida House of Representatives in 2016

In 2004, incumbent State Representative Jerry Paul, who had been nominated by President George W. Bush as the Chief Operating Officer and Deputy Administrator of the National Nuclear Security Administration, decided not to run for re-election to a third term in the legislature. Grant ran to succeed him in the 71st District, and Christopher King, an optometrist, opposed him in the Republican primary. The Sarasota Herald-Tribune endorsed Grant over King, praising him for being "effective on the Airport Authority" and for his "first grasp of the many issues he'd face in the Legislature," noting, "While either candidate would represent the district well, Grant's political and business experience, and broad ties to the community, give him the edge." The campaign was tightly fought, and in the end, Grant emerged narrowly victorious, defeating King by just 243 votes with 51% of the vote. In the general election, Grant faced Shaneen Wahl, the Democratic nominee, and Walter Augustinowicz, the Libertarian nominee. All three candidates agreed on the need to rebuild the region following the devastation of Hurricane Charley, which struck earlier that year, and Grant argued that the state's tax laws needed to be rewritten to prevent homeowners from having to pay higher taxes when they rebuild their homes. Grant was once again endorsed by the Herald-Tribune, which, though it noted that either candidate "would do a fine job," Grant's "long dedication to the community and his political experience" earned him their endorsement. He defeated his opponents by a wide margin to win his first term in the legislature, receiving 56% of the vote to Wahl's 41% and Augustinowicz's 3%.

When Grant ran for re-election in 2006, he was challenged in the Republican primary by tax professional Richard Santos. He campaigned on his accomplishments in the legislature, which included allowing homeowners to rebuild their homes after hurricanes without facing a tax increase, making it a crime to "knowingly give false information to police investigating a felony or missing-persons case," and working to provide tax incentives to private businesses that strengthen buildings to be used as hurricane shelters, while Santos campaigned on his plans to change the state's custody laws. Santos was not a significant challenge for Grant to overcome, and he defeated him in a landslide, winning renomination with 76% of the vote. He faced no major opposition in the general election, but still received the endorsement of the Herald-Tribune again, which noted his "commendable job" representing the district and praised his "bipartisan support." Facing only a write-in challenge, Grant won re-election with nearly 100% of the vote.

== 2008 State Senate campaign ==
When State Senator Lisa Carlton was unable to seek re-election to the State Senate due to term limits, Grant ran to succeed her in the 23rd District, which included western Charlotte County, a small segment of Manatee County, and most of Sarasota County. In the Republican primary, he faced former State Representative Nancy Detert. Grant faced a challenge in that only thirty percent of the district's voters lived in Charlotte County, his home county, while nearly seventy percent lived in Sarasota County, Detert's home county. He campaigned on his conservative credentials, emphasizing that he opposed abortion while Detert, a moderate, supported abortion rights. He significantly outraised Detert, and earned the endorsement of then-Governor Charlie Crist and State Senator Mike Bennett, while Detert was endorsed by Carlton. Grant and Detert were careful to avoid excessively negative campaigning against each other, mindful of the fact that the eventual nominee faced a tough challenge against the Democratic nominee. Ultimately, Grant ended up narrowly losing to Detert by fewer than two thousand votes, taking 48% of the vote to her 52%.

== 2012 Florida House campaign ==
In 2012, when the state's legislative districts were redrawn, Grant opted to run in the newly created 76th District, which was based in southern Lee County. He faced Ray Rodrigues, a member of the Stoneybrook Community Development District and a Lee County Housing Authority Commissioner, and Chauncey Solinger, a business owner. Grant campaigned on his legislative experience and on "improving the business climate in Florida so that companies can expand and create jobs." He was attacked during the campaign for not living and working in the district, as he owned a home in Charlotte County, though he claimed that he lived in Estero, and that once his home sold, he would purchase property in Estero. Perhaps owing to his low name recognition in the district, Grant was overwhelmingly defeated, receiving only 28% of the vote to Rodrigues's 50%.

== Return to the Florida House ==
Grant announced that he would run for the Florida House again in 2016 in the 75th District, which includes all of Charlotte County. The incumbent State Representative, Ken Roberson- who was initially elected in 2008 to succeed Grant in the 71st District- could not seek a fifth term due to term limits. Grant won the race unopposed. He was subsequently elected in 2018 (unopposed), 2022 (by 21.2%), and 2022 (unopposed). During his second period in congress, he has served as the vice-chair for the Ways and Means Committee and Health & Human Services Committee. In 2023, he become the Majority leader.

Florida House of Representatives
Preceded by Jerald Paul	Member of the Florida House of Representatives from the 71st district 2004–2008	Succeeded by Ken Roberson
Preceded by Ken Roberson	Member of the Florida House of Representatives from the 75th district 2016–2024	Succeeded by Danny Nix
Preceded by Dane Eagle	Majority Leader of the Florida House of Representatives; 2020–2024	Succeeded by Tyler Sirois
