= David Bitner =

American politician (1948–2011)

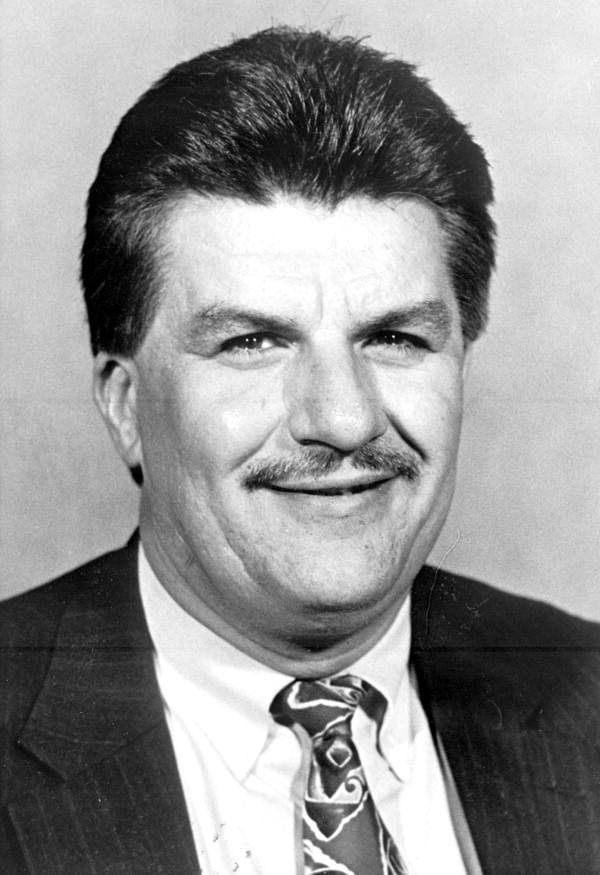

Chairman of the Republican Party of Florida
- In office January 15, 2011 – September 8, 2011
- Preceded by: John Thrasher
- Succeeded by: Lenny Curry

Member of the Florida House of Representatives from the 71st district
- In office November 3, 1992 – November 7, 2000
- Preceded by: David Thomas
- Succeeded by: Jerald Paul

Personal details
- Born: December 11, 1948 Hagerstown, Maryland
- Died: September 8, 2011 (aged 62) Tallahassee, Florida
- Party: Republican
- Spouse: Wendy
- Occupation: Newspaper editor, businessman

David Bitner (December 11, 1948 – September 8, 2011) was a Republican politician from Florida who served as a member of the Florida House of Representatives from 1992 to 2000 and as chairman of the Republican Party of Florida in 2011.

== Early years ==
Bitner was born in Hagerstown, Maryland.

== Education ==
Bitner graduated from the North Hagerstown High School. Bitner was chairman of the Republican Party of Florida. He served in the Florida House of Representatives.

== Personal information ==
Bitner and his family currently reside in Port Charlotte. Along with being a politician, Bitner was also a small business owner.

== Family ==
Bitner had one daughter named Jennifer Virginia.

== Religion ==
Bitner was a Baptist.

== Recreational Interest ==
In his free time, he enjoyed golf, fishing, hunting, and baseball-card collecting.

== Death ==
Bitner died September 8, 2011, after suffering from amyotrophic lateral sclerosis (ALS) (sometimes called Lou Gehrig's disease) for several months.
