= Trudi Williams =

American politician

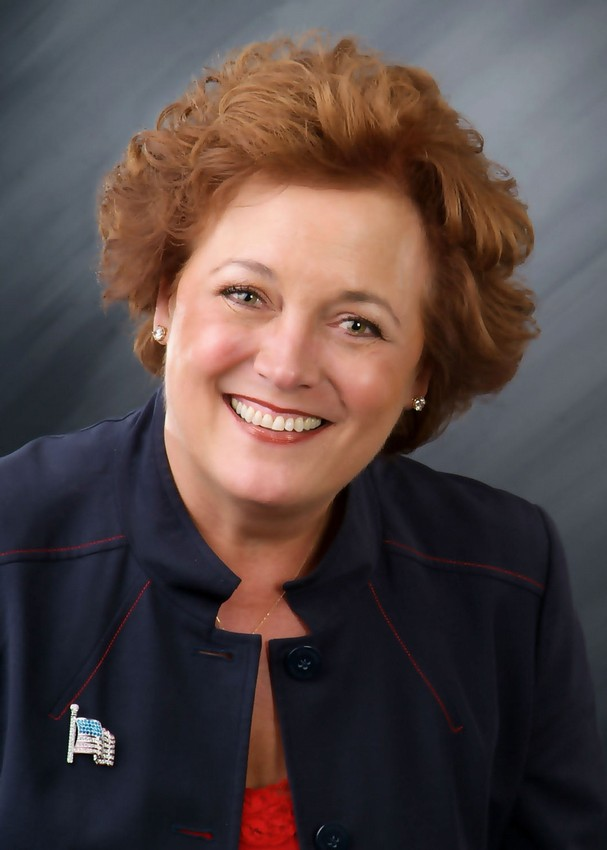

Member of the Florida House of Representatives from the 75th district
- In office November 2, 2004 – November 6, 2012
- Preceded by: Carole Green
- Succeeded by: Ken Roberson

Personal details
- Born: October 22, 1953 (age 72)
- Party: Republican
- Spouse: Don Williams
- Profession: Environmental Engineer

Trudi K. Williams (born October 22, 1953) is an American politician in the state of Florida. She served as a Republican representative in the Florida House of Representatives for the 75th district. She was first elected to the legislature in 2004, and then was re-elected to three successive terms. In 2009, she chaired the agriculture and natural resources policy committee.

== Early life ==
Williams was born in Ottawa, Ontario, Canda on October 22, 1953. She moved to Florida in 1968 and received her bachelor of science degree in engineering from Florida International University in 1981, before working as a civil and environmental engineer. Her clients as an engineer included developers such as WCI Communities. She married Don Williams and the couple have three children: Ryan, Kristen, Shannen.

== Political career ==
Williams was initially elected to the Florida House of Representatives for the 75th district in the 2004 general election, representing the Republican Party.

In February 2009, as chair of the House agriculture and natural resources policy committee, Williams initiated a legislative effort to deregulate land development. Her proposals to make permits easier to obtain and to require officials to issue permits more quickly than under previous laws drew support from the Associated Industries of Florida, the Florida Home Builders Association, and the Florida Association of Community Developers. Williams said the slow pace of development related permits, such as large water withdrawals or wetlands development, was harmful to the state's economy.

In 2010, she sponsored a bill banning "the sale and trade of Burmese pythons and other invasive reptiles".
