= Greg Gay =

American politician

Member of the Florida House of Representatives from the 74 district
- In office November 3, 1992-November 7, 2000
- Preceded by: Tim Ireland
- Succeeded by: Jeff Kottkamp

Personal details
- Born: April 2, 1952 (age 74)
- Party: Republican
- Profession: Accountant

Greg Gay (born April 2, 1952, in Missouri) is a former member of the House of Representatives of the U.S. state of Florida, representing the Cape Coral area. He received his bachelor's degree from Florida State University in 1978.
