= Jerald Paul =

American politician

Jerald S. Paul
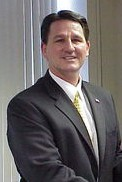

Principal Deputy Administrator National Nuclear Security Administration
- In office July 2004 – August 2006
- Succeeded by: William C. Ostendorff

Member of the Florida House of Representatives from the 71st district
- In office 2000–2004
- Preceded by: David Bitner
- Succeeded by: Michael J. Grant

Personal details
- Born: February 26, 1966 (age 60) Lancaster, Ohio
- Education: Maine Maritime Academy (BS); University of Florida; Stetson University (JD)
- Known for: Served in the Florida House of Representatives; U.S. National Security Official; Attorney; Engineer; College President, Rear Admiral USMS (RET)

Jerald Scott Paul (born 1966 in Lancaster, Ohio) served as the Principal Deputy Administrator of the National Nuclear Security Administration at the U.S. Department of Energy. He was nominated by the and confirmed by the U.S. Senate in July 2004. He oversaw all of this agency's $10B budget including nuclear nonproliferation programs with the principal responsibility of preventing the spread of nuclear materials, technology and expertise. In August 2006, Paul returned to his law practice in Tallahassee, Florida.

Paul has owned and operated multiple firms practicing law, governmental affairs, and communications. He previously served as a Representative in the House of Representatives of the U.S. state of Florida. He earned a B.S. degree in Marine Engineering from the Maine Maritime Academy in 1989 and then earned a Post Baccalaureate degree in Nuclear Engineering at the University of Florida. Paul received his Juris Doctor from the Stetson University in December 1994. He served as Distinguished Fellow for Energy Policy at the University of Tennessee where he also taught classes. He later served as President of Maine Maritime Academy, a four-year college in Castine, Maine during a term marked by enrollment growth, fiscal stability, record increases in funding and increased rankings. In 2022 he was appointed Rear Admiral, USMS by the U.S. Maritime Administration.
