= Florida Department of Elder Affairs =

Government organization in Tallahassee, United States

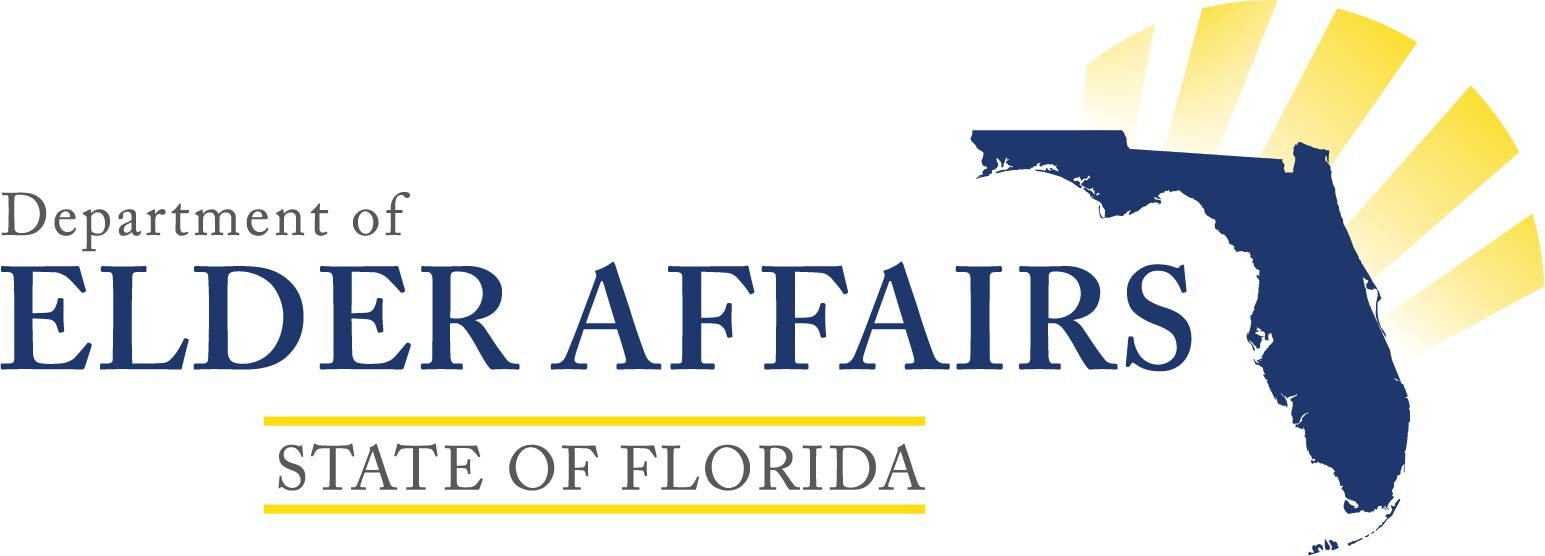

Agency overview
- Formed: 1992
- Website: https://elderaffairs.org/

The Florida Department of Elder Affairs (DOEA) is the Florida government agency focused on senior citizens. As described in the Older Americans Act, it is the state's unit on aging. It oversees the Office of Public and Professional Guardians (OPPG).

The department's creation was approved in a 1988 constitutional amendment under the name Department of Elderly Affairs but did not begin operations until January 1992. Governor Lawton Chiles, who established the department, started calling it Elder Affairs since he thought Elderly Affairs was less dignified. The department started with just six employees and some volunteers. E. Bentley Lipscomb was the first secretary for the department.

== See also ==
- Administration on Aging
