= Tim Ireland (politician) =

American politician (born 1958)

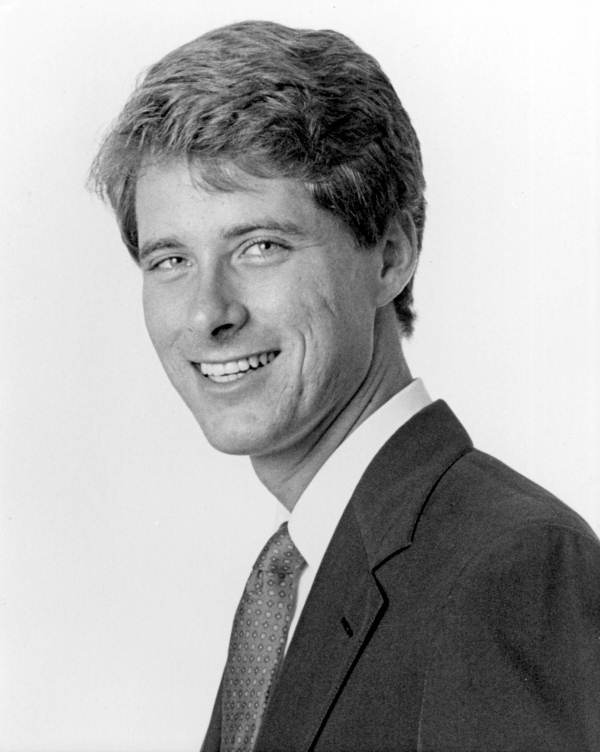
- Ireland in 1986

Member of the Florida House of Representatives
- In office November 4, 1986 – November 8, 1994
- Preceded by: Fred Dudley
- Succeeded by: Ralph Livingston
- Constituency: 74th district (1986–1992); 75th district (1992–1994)

Personal details
- Born: July 22, 1958 (age 68) Fort Leavenworth, Kansas, U.S.
- Party: Republican
- Education: Stetson University

Timothy F. Ireland (born July 22, 1958) is an American politician. He served as a Republican member for the 74th and 75th district of the Florida House of Representatives.

== Life and career ==
Ireland was born in Fort Leavenworth, Kansas. He attended Stetson University.

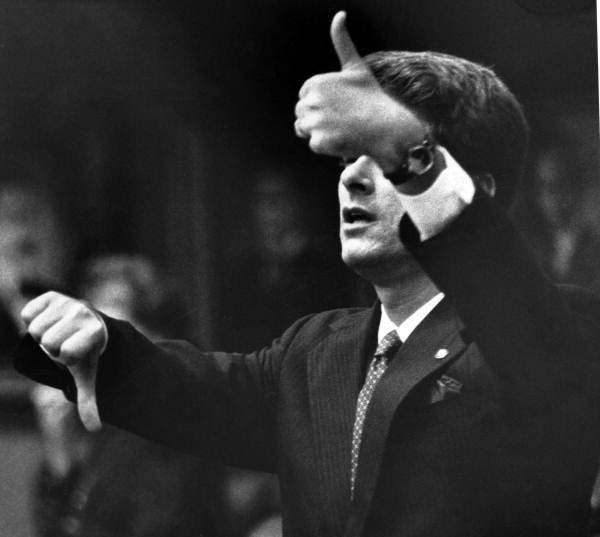
Ireland in 1991

In 1986, Ireland was elected to represent the 74th district of the Florida House of Representatives, succeeding Fred Dudley. He served until 1992, when he was succeeded by Greg Gay. In the same year, he was elected to represent the 75th district, succeeding Mary Ellen Hawkins. He served until 1994, when he was succeeded by Ralph L. Livingston.

Party political offices
Preceded by Tom Gallagher	Republican nominee for Treasurer, Insurance Commissioner, and Fire Marshal of Florida; 1994, 1998	Succeeded by Tom Gallagher
