= Claude Engle =

American electrical engineer (1938–2023)

Claude R. Engle III (March 30, 1938 – December 3, 2023) was an American electrical engineer and internationally known lighting consultant. He designed lighting schemes for many notable structures including the Reichstag and the Louvre.

== Life and career ==
Engle attended Princeton University, attaining a BSEE in 1960 and was a registered professional engineer. Prior to entering private practice, he worked in New York City in the design of theatrical and television lighting.

Engle was chairman of the Capital Section of the Illuminating Engineering Society (IES) and was a member of the faculty at Princeton University School of Architecture. He has been a judge of the IES National Lighting Competition and a member of the American Institute of Architects Jury for interior design for Houston, Texas and Los Angeles.

Engle died in Ottawa, Ontario, Canada on December 3, 2023, at the age of 85.

== Works ==
- U.S. Pavilion, Expo '67, Montreal, Canada (1967)
- World Bank, Washington, D.C. (1968)
- Cathedral of the Holy Name, Chicago, Illinois (1969)
- Chicago Transit Authority, Chicago, 1970
- Pennzoil Plaza, Houston, Texas, 1972
- World Trade Center, New York City, 1973
- Australian Embassy, Paris, 1974
- Temple Beth El, Detroit, Michigan, 1974
- MGIC Center, Milwaukee, Wisconsin, 1974
- Sears Tower, Chicago, 1975
- Avery Fisher Hall, Lincoln Center, New York City, 1975
- Centre Georges Pompidou, Paris, 1976
- Washington Mall, Washington, D.C., 1976
- Roy Thomson Hall, Toronto, Canada, 1976
- National Gallery of Art East Wing, Washington, D.C., 1976
- Sainsbury Centre for the Visual Arts, University of East Anglia, England, 1976
- Crystal Cathedral, Garden Grove, California, 1977
- Water Tower Place, Chicago, 1977
- Kennedy Center for Performing Arts Terrace Theater, Washington, D.C., 1978
- A.T. & T. Corporate Headquarters, New York City, 1979
- Orchestra Hall, Chicago, 1980
- Vietnam Veterans Memorial, Washington, D.C., 1982
- Fragrant Hill Hotel, Beijing, China, 1982
- Waverly Civic Center, Victoria, Australia, 1982
- The Regent Hotel, Hong Kong, 1983
- Riverside Centre, Brisbane, Australia, 1983
- McDonald's Corporation Headquarters Training Center, Oak Brook, Illinois, 1983
- Cleveland Play House (Philip Johnson addition), Cleveland, Ohio, 1983
- Hong Kong Club, Hong Kong, 1984
- Fogg Art Museum Sackler Gallery, Boston, 1984
- Exchange Square, Hong Kong, 1985
- I.B.M. Tower, Atlanta, 1985
- Transco Tower, Houston, 1985
- Hong Kong Shanghai Bank, Hong Kong, 1986
- Art Institute of Chicago, Chicago, 1986
- QVI Office Tower, Perth, Australia, 1987
- Grand Louvre, Paris, 1989
- Vitra Design Museum, Weil am Rhein, Germany, 1990
- Century Tower, Tokyo, 1990
- Stansted Airport Terminal, Stansted, England, 1991
- Bilbao Metro, Bilbao, Spain, 1992
- Carre d'Art de Nîmes, Nîmes, France, 1993
- Freer Gallery of Art, Washington, D.C., 1993
- Grand Louvre, Aile Richelieu, Paris, 1993
- Business Promotion Center, Duisburg, Germany, 1993
- Corning Glass Museum, Corning, New York, 1994
- Joslyn Museum, Omaha, 1994
- Tokyo International Forum, Tokyo, 1996
- United States Court of Appeals, San Francisco, 1996
- Repsol Service Station, Madrid, 1997
- Valencia Congress Center, Valencia, Spain, 1998
- Reichstag, Berlin, 1999
- Queen Elizabeth II Great Court, British Museum, London, 1999
- Canary Wharf tube station, Jubilee Line Extension, London, 1999
- San Francisco International Airport, 2001
- Millennium Bridge, London, 2002
- Dumbarton Oaks Courtyard Gallery, Washington, 2002
- Greater London Authority, 2002
- Paragon Research and Development Centre, Surrey, England, 2003
- Clark Center, Stanford University, 2003
- Mercado de Colon, Valencia, Spain 2004
- Cathedral of Light, Oakland, California, 2004
- Leslie L. Dan Pharmacy Building, University of Toronto, 2006

== Publications ==
- "Technique*of*Lighting*the*Stage"
- "Color*and*Its*Part*in*Stage*Lighting"
- "Methods*of*Stage*Lighting*Controls"
- "Evaluation*of*Dimmer*Characteristics*for*Incandescent*Lighting"
- "Sunscoop"
- "Light*and*Space"
