= Florida's 75th House of Representatives district =

Florida district

Florida's 75th State House of Representatives district
Representative
Danny Nix Jr. R–Port Charlotte

Florida's 75th House of Representatives district elects one member of the Florida House of Representatives. It contains parts of Charlotte County and Sarasota County.

== Members ==
- Ralph Livingston (until 1998)
- Carole Green (1998–2004)
- Trudi Williams (2004–2012)
- Ken Roberson (2012–2016)
- Michael J. Grant (2016–2024)
- Danny Nix Jr. (since 2024)
