= Peter Barnes (lighting designer) =

British lighting designer

Peter Barnes (born 25 February 1955 in Enfield, London) is a British lighting designer, lighting director, show producer and set designer. He is credited with more than 150 designs for live music, film, television, dance, fashion, art and architecture. He is known in the live music industry as 'the UK's guru of pop lighting'. He was the show producer, lighting and set designer for the Spice Girls live shows including the massive, international Spiceworld tour and the Christmas in Spiceworld tour. He designed the lighting for Live 8 and his design was used around the world for all major Live 8 venues with an estimated worldwide audience of 3 billion people. In 2000 he was voted Lighting Designer of the Year by Live! Magazine and was nominated Lighting Designer of the Year by Total Production magazine in 2008, 2009 and 2010

== Personal life ==
Barnes lives with his wife Sue and has a daughter named Joanna. He lives in Cookham Dean, Berkshire, UK.

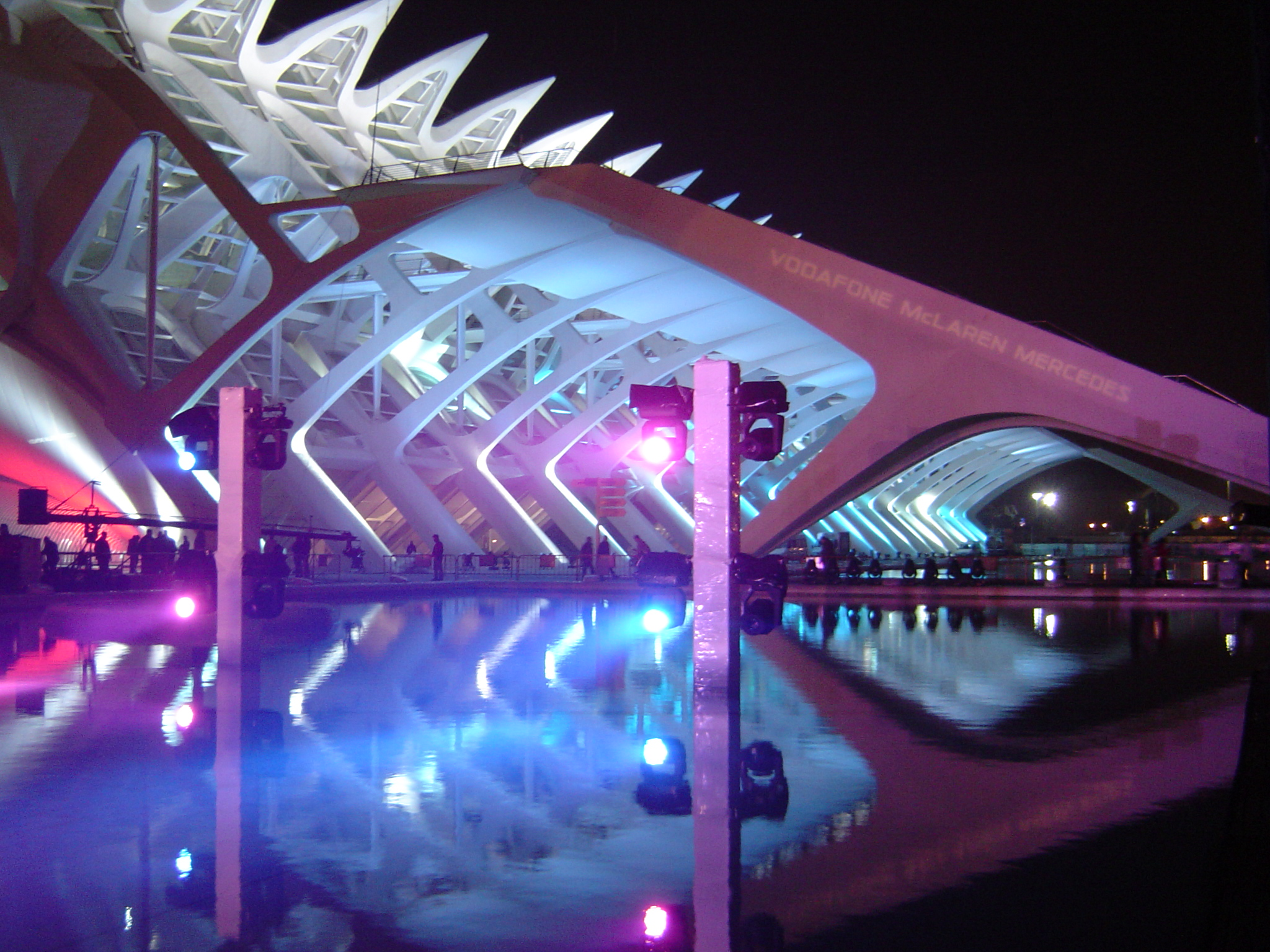
Vodafone McLaren Mercedes F1 Launch, Valencia, Spain 2007

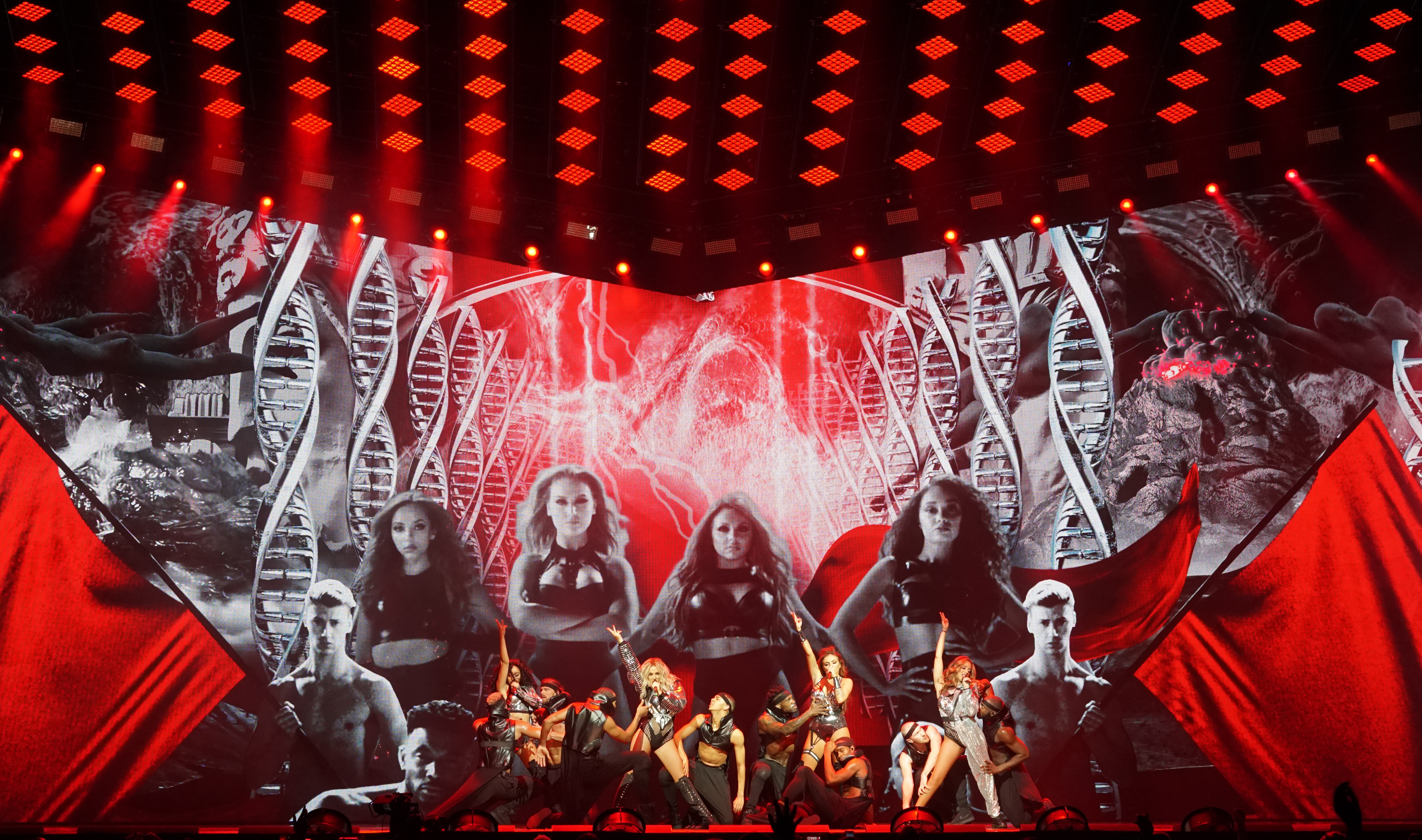
Little Mix, Glory Days UK Tour 2017

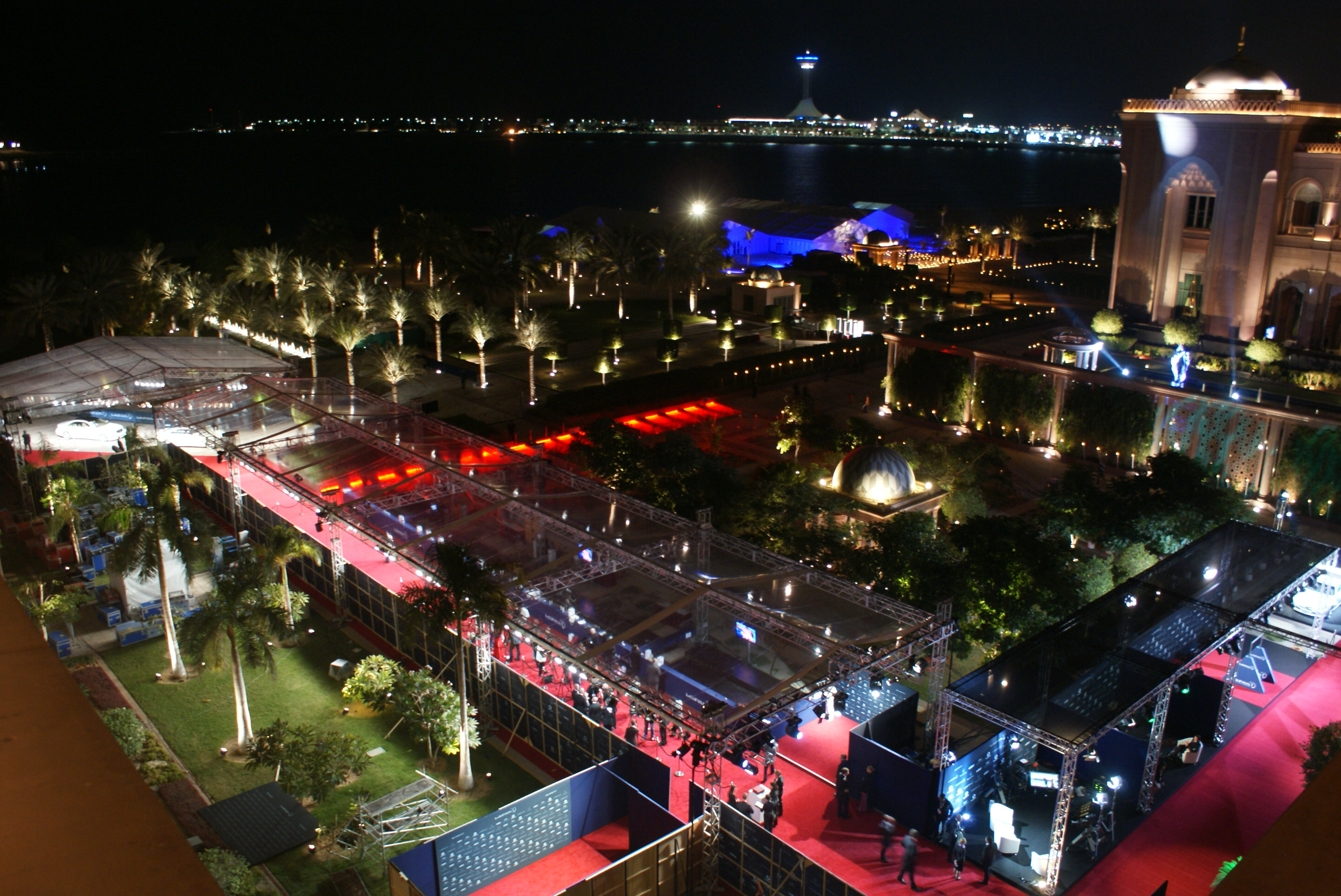
Laureus World Sports Awards, Abu Dhabi 2011

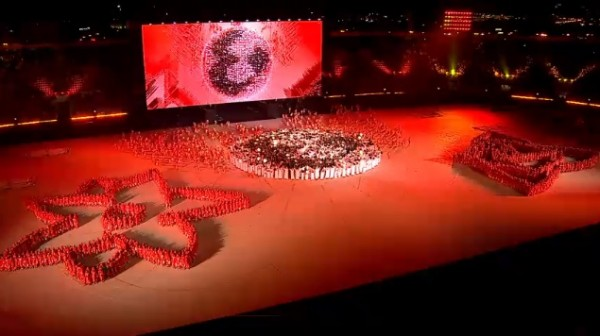
Oman National Day, Oman 2010

== List of productions designed (selected) ==
Music

- Little Mix World Tour 2014-2019
- The Vamps (British band) Tour 2014-2022
- Siouxsie Sioux Yoko Ono's Meltdown festival, Royal Festival Hall, London 2013
- Cheryl Cole Million Lights tour 2012
- Olly Murs tour 2012–2013
- JLS (2010 + 2023)
- Capital Radio Summer Ball and Jingle Bell Ball (2008–2025)
- Girls Aloud (2006–2009, 2013 + 2024)
- Boyzone (1995–1996, 2008–2011, 2013, 2016,2018)
- Wireless Festival (2006–2010)
- Westlife (2003–2008)
- X Factor tour (2005–2017)
- Ronan Keating (2003–2025)
- The Corrs (2004)
- S Club 7 (2001–2003)
- Blue (English band) (2002–2004)
- So Solid Crew (2001)
- Mark Knopfler (2001)
- Des'ree (1994–2000)
- Melanie C (1999–2000)
- Spice Girls (1997–2000)
- Kula Shaker (1997)
- East 17 (1994–1997)
- Sting (1994)
- Paul Simon (1993)
- EMF (1991–1992)
- Lisa Stansfield (1990–1997)
- Bros (1988–1989)
- The Cult (1988)
- Big Country (1983–1988)
- Magazine (1981)
- Motörhead (1980–1981)
- Siouxsie and the Banshees (1979–1983)
- James Brown (1978)
- Fats Domino (1977)
- Sutherland Brothers and Quiver (1976–1977)

Events

- Global Music Awards (2018-2020)
- Oman National Day, Oman (2010)
- Laureus World Sports Awards, Russia and Abu Dhabi (2008–2011)
- McLaren Mercedes F1 launch, Spain (2007)
- Live 8 (2005)
- De Lovely film launch, Cannes Film Festival (2004)

Stage shows

- Diversity (dance troupe) (2010- 2023)
- Peter Kay (2010, 2011)
- Michael Flatley Celtic Tiger (2005)
- Michael Flatley Feet of Flames (2000)

Television and DVD

- Solidarity games, Opening and closing ceremony Baku 2017
- Meet The Parents ITV Series 2016
- Get Your Act Together ITV Series 2014
- MTV Brand New show 2014
- Goldfrapp cinema event live show 2014
- Derren Brown Live Channel 4 2014
- Imagine Dragons MTV EMA's 2013
- Stephen Lawrence Tribute BBC 2013
- Big Reunion ITV 2013, 2014
- Toto DVD 2013
- Only Connect, BBC2 (2008–2025)
- Chris Moyles Comedy Empire BBC 2012
- John Cleese DVD 2011
- Irish Music Awards, Ireland (2002–2009)
- Childline, Ireland (2002–2013)
- Celtic Thunder, Ireland, Canada & USA (2007–2010)
- David Broza Live at Masada, PBS (2007)
- Lionel Richie (2007)
- Celtic Woman (2006)
- The Secret Policeman's Ball UK (2006)
- CD:UK, ITV (2004–2005)
- Madonna, DVD (2006)
- Beyoncé, DVD (2004)
- Will Young and Gareth Gates, DVD (2002)
- David Gray, DVD (2002)
- The Royal Variety Show, BBC (1996)
- Top of the Pops Special, BBC (1997)
- Smash Hits, BBC (1992–1996)
