= Filippo Cannata =

Italian lighting designer

Filippo Cannata is an Italian lighting designer, born in Brescia in 1962.

== Biography ==
After a long course of training at the major international institutions of lighting design and the most important lighting companies in the world, starting in the '80s, Cannata began to collaborate with artists and great masters of design and architecture as Dino Gavina, Cleto Munari, Alessandro Mendini, Mimmo Paladino, and then Aldo Cibic, Matteo Thun, David Chipperfield, Buro Happold, Atkins Architect, Stefano Boeri, Paolo Portoghesi, Mario Cucinella etc..

In 1992 he founded his first studio. In 2001, convinced that light is an important form of communication, it has transformed its name in Cannata & Partners Lighting Design Communication. This is a research laboratory that explores topics and content related to the light, its manifestations in nature, its history, its evolution through technology and design, to its use in professional and artistic contexts. More precisely, a workshop of ideas which aims to create a special language of emotions and experience through a light that has its roots in the area, the history and traditions of the culture of the Mediterranean.

He is a lecturer in the Specialization Course "Build - Building and Urban Innovative Lighting Design" in the University of Naples Federico II, holds seminars at various universities in Italy and abroad, and at master's degree in lighting design; participates in national and international competitions in architecture in collaboration with well-known studies and is a member of associations such as PLDA, AIDI, IES, CIBSE.

== Main projects ==
=== Saudi Arabia ===
- Al Saedan – Real Estate Office Building Headquarter - Riyadh - KSA (2008)

=== Egypt ===
- Saudi Arabian Embassy - El Cairo (in progress)

=== United Arab Emirates ===
- Pier8 Tower - Abyaar Real Estate Development - Dubai Marina, Dubai (in progress)

France

- Centre Régional de la Méditerranée (CRM) in collaboration with Architetto Stefano Boeri - Marsiglia (2012)

=== Switzerland ===
- Hugo Boss Industries in collaboration with Matteo Thun & Partners – Coldrerio (2008)

=== Slovenia ===
- Intra Light Industries – Nova Gorica (2012)

=== Greece ===
- Royal Olympic Hotel – Athene (2006)

=== Italy ===
- Piazza Conti Guidi: Una piazza per Leonardo in collaboration with Mimmo Paladino – Vinci (Florence) (2007)
- Reggia di Caserta (2004)
- I.Net British Telecom – Cibic & Partners – Settimo Milanese (Milan) (2000)
- Diners Club International – Rome (1999)
- Acquedotto Alto Calore in collaboration with Mimmo Paladino - Solopaca (Benevento) (2007)
- Hortus Conclusus in collaboration with the artist Mimmo Paladino, the architects Roberto Serino and Pasquale Palmieri - Benevento (1992)

== Honours and awards ==
- 1997 - Edison Award of Merit for Hortus Conclusus Benevento
- 2007 - Tropheès Lumiville "Espace Public" for Piazza Conti Guidi Vinci (FI)
- 2009 - Premio Urbanistica 2009 for Alto Calore Servizi S.p.a.
