= Ken Roberson =

American politician

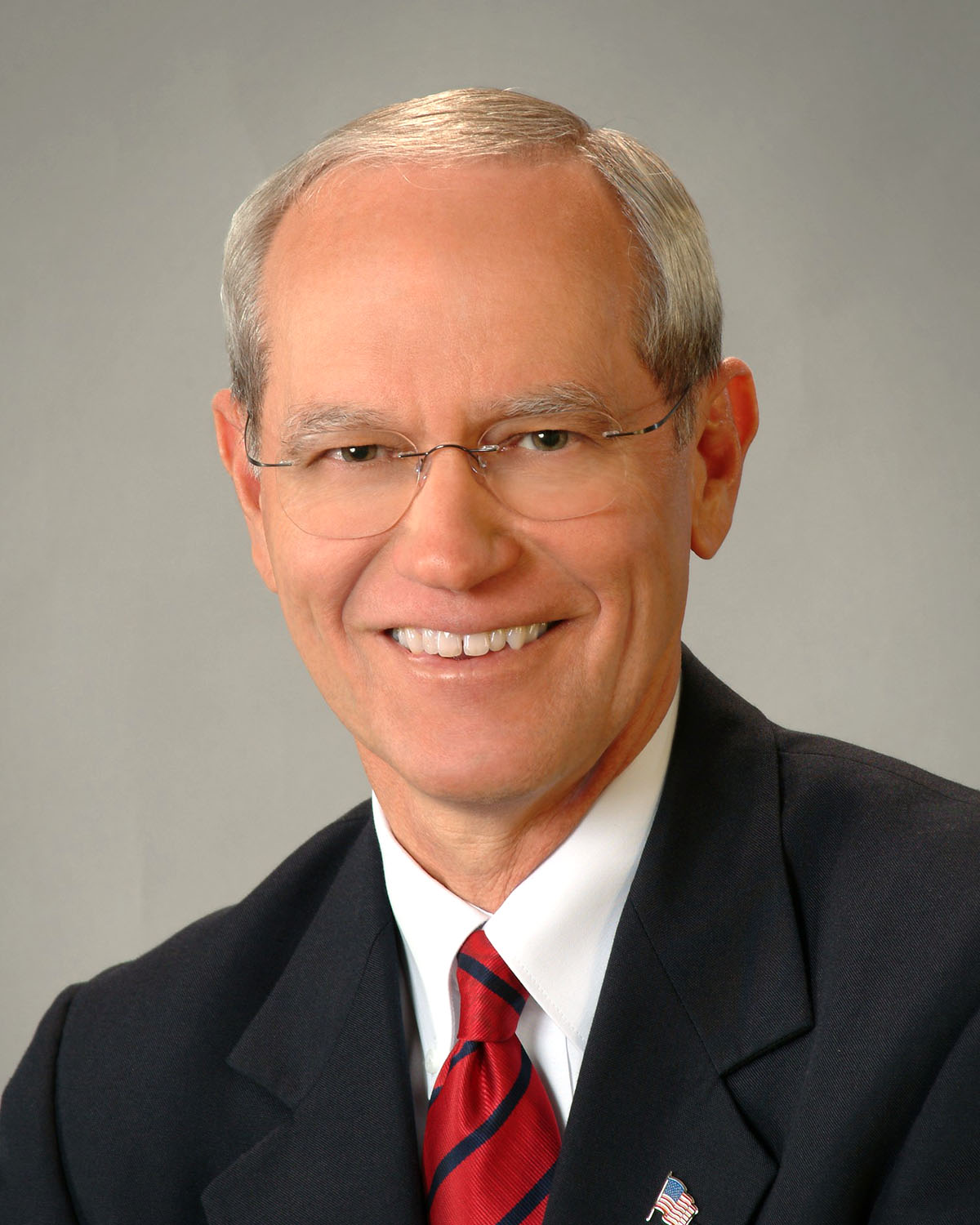

Member of the Florida House of Representatives
- In office November 4, 2008 – November 8, 2016
- Preceded by: Michael J. Grant
- Succeeded by: Michael J. Grant
- Constituency: 71st district (2008–2012); 75th district (2012–2016)

Personal details
- Born: November 5, 1943 (age 82) Bradenton, Florida
- Party: Republican
- Children: James Clay Roberson, Mark L. Roberson
- Education: Manatee Junior College (A.A.); Dallas Institute of Mortuary Science (B.S.); University of South Florida
- Profession: Funeral director

Kenneth L. Roberson (born November 5, 1943) is a Republican member of the Florida House of Representatives, representing the 75th District, which is based in Charlotte County, including the communities of Punta Gorda and Port Charlotte from 2012 to 2016, he previously represented the 71st District from 2008 to 2012.

== History ==
Roberson was born in Bradenton, and attended Manatee Junior College, graduating with his associate degree in 1963. Following this, he attended the Dallas Institute of Mortuary Science, receiving a bachelor's degree in mortuary science in 1965 and graduating as the salutatorian. Returning to Florida, he studied personnel management and business administration at the University of South Florida from 1966 to 1969. Roberson founded his own business, Roberson Funeral Home & Crematory, Inc., in 1976, and continues to serve as the President. From 1998 to 2004, he served as the Chairman of the Florida State Board of Funeral Directors and Embalmers.

== Florida House of Representatives ==
When incumbent State Representative Lindsay M. Harrington was unable to seek re-election in 2004, Roberson ran to succeed him in the Republican primary in the 72nd District, which included parts of Charlotte County, Desoto County, and Lee County, facing Paige Kreegel, Louis Kirschner, and Gary M. Miller. Roberson ended up losing, receiving 29% of the vote to Kreegel's 40%.

In 2008, when State Representative Michael J. Grant opted to run for the Florida Senate rather than seeking re-election, Roberson ran in the 71st District, which neighbored the 72nd District and was based in Charlotte County, Lee County, and Sarasota County, to fill the open seat. In the Republican primary, Roberson defeated Christopher Constance and Richard J. Santons, winning with 53% of the vote. In the general election, he faced Democratic nominee Betty Gissendanner, a retired insurance agent, whom he was able to easily defeat, receiving 54% of the vote to her 46%. Running for re-election in 2010, Roberson faced Democrat Andrew Saltman, who criticized Roberson for being "old," "creepy," and a "zombie," arguing that he was "mentally more competent, physically more competent than" the incumbent. Roberson, meanwhile, campaigned on his "core principles of less government, lower taxes and more personal freedom," and was endorsed by the Sarasota Herald-Tribune, which praised him as a public who had "run dignified campaigns, promoted civility in the legislature and treated constituents with respect."

In 2012, when the legislative districts were reconfigured, Roberson was drawn into the 75th District, which closely resembled Roberson's previous district, cutting out the sections of Lee County and Sarasota County to include all of Charlotte County. Roberson faced no opposition in the primary or the general election, and won his third term entirely uncontested.
