= Museum planning =

Design and organization of a museum

Museum planning is the creation of documents to describe a new museum’s vision, the visitor experience and an organizational plan for a new institution, or one undergoing a major expansion or change in focus.

Museum plans may include some or all of the following:

- A review of institutional resources, assets and collections
- A review of local attractions and museums
- A new or updated mission and vision
- Collections objectives of the new institution
- Educational objectives of the new institution
- Experience objectives of the new institution
- Potential visitor and other audience and user groups
- Interpretive Plan
- Exhibition storylines
- Visitor flow diagrams
- Thematic treatments
- Preliminary exhibition layout
- Style Boards
- Exhibition Renderings
- Space Needs Analysis
- Site selection
- Architectural Concepts
- Preliminary staffing plan
- Preliminary project schedule
- Preliminary project budget

Plans are created by a museum planning team, that includes; museum staff and volunteers, members of the board of directors, community members, and representatives of city and state planning agencies working together with a museum planner, architects, exhibit designers, economists, and other specialist consultants. The objective of a Museum Plan is to create a clear and concise “road map” for the creation of new institution and a sustainable long term museum vision.

Museum planning may also refer to the designing of museum galleries, spaces, or new wings and buildings. The goal of a well-designed museum space is that it accents the collection, and puts the patron at ease. There are many features of galleries that must be considered when organizing and planning a new space. Some of those aspects are circulation, density, lighting, backgrounds, arrangement, and labels.

The circulation of the space indicates the layout and direction of flow for visitors. This can be done by numbering objects, or the layout of displays. Poor circulation can result in the patron missing some galleries or displays or viewing objects in an order other than what the curator intended. Circulation should feel natural and logical; the patron may feel herded and become resentful.

Density, clarity, and emphasis are other aspects to consider when planning a new space. Galleries and individual objects should be placed so that everything appears to have equal value and importance. Then within displays, objects should not be overcrowded or cluttered. Lighting is extremely important and cannot be overlooked when planning new galleries. Natural light is ideal, but it must be filtered, and not too intense. It also should be consistent throughout the day – northern and southern exposure is ideal.

Backgrounds can refer to a number of things: props, panels, or a simple painted wall can serve as a background to an object or display. These must be subdued enough that they do not detract from the object on display, but they should be complementary. The specific position, arrangement, and display of an object is important to consider. Height of the display case, order in which objects are placed or hung, and the grouping of certain objects are all major factors in how patrons interpret objects.

Museum label and explanatory accessories are essential to a patron’s experience in a museum. Enough information should be provided that the patron feels as if they understand what they are looking at, but too much can bore or confuse the visitor. Some examples of these accessories are collection guides available for the overall museum experience, larger panels at the start of each gallery that can explain the intent of the collection, and smaller panels at each object should inform the viewer the object’s use, medium, creator, and dates.
