= 1994 Florida Treasurer election =

1994 election in Florida

- November 8, 1994
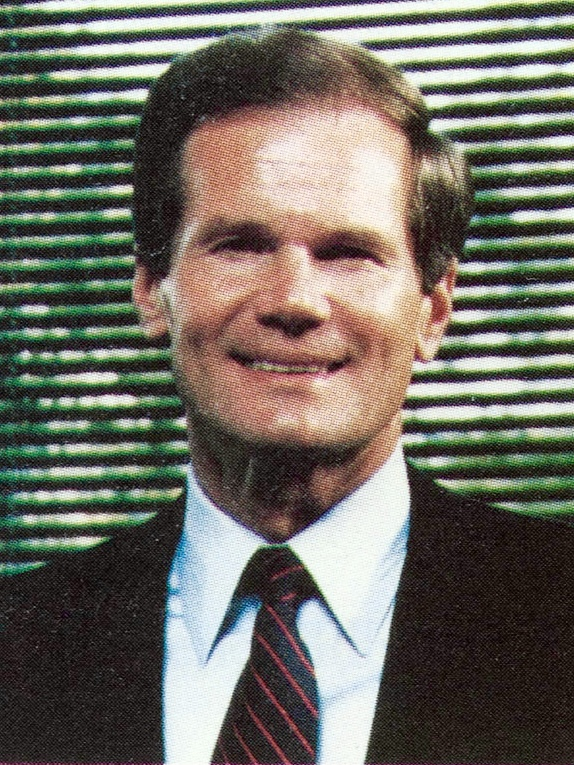

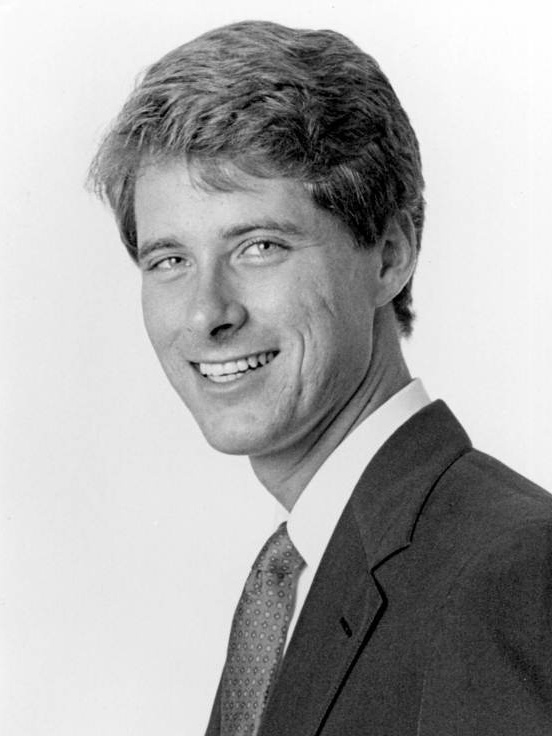
Nominee	Bill Nelson	Tim Ireland
Party	Democratic	Republican
Popular vote	2,070,604	1,933,570
Percentage	51.7%	48.3%
- Ireland: 50–60% 60–70% 70–80% 80–90% >90% Nelson: 50–60% 60–70% 70–80% 80–90% >90% Tie: 50% No votes
Treasurer before election
Tom Gallagher
Republican
Elected Treasurer
Bill Nelson
Democratic

The 1994 Florida Treasurer election took place on November 8, 1994 to elect the Treasurer, Insurance Commissioner, and Fire Marshal of Florida, alongside many other elections in the state and around the country.

Incumbent Treasurer Tom Gallagher was term-limited and unable to run again. In his place, Democrat Bill Nelson was elected with 51.7% of the vote, defeating Republican State Rep. Tim Ireland.

== Candidates ==
=== Democratic primary ===
- Bill Nelson, former member of the United States House of Representatives from Florida's 11th congressional district (1979-1991)
- Karen Gievers, lawyer and activist from Miami, Florida
- Fred Westman

Democratic primary results
Party	Candidate	Votes	%
Democratic	Bill Nelson	431,623	54.57%
Democratic	Karen Gievers	299,916	37.92%
Democratic	Fred Westman	59,436	7.51%

=== Republican primary ===
- Tim Ireland, Member of the Florida House of Representatives from Florida's 75th State House district (1984-1992)
- R. K. "Skip" Hunter, insurance executive from Pensacola, Florida

Republican primary results
Party	Candidate	Votes	%
Republican	Tim Ireland	478,760	64.13%
Republican	R. K. "Skip" Hunter	267,801	35.87%

== General election ==
=== Campaign ===
During the general election, Ireland accused Nelson of trying to intimidate insurance agents and company officials who supported Ireland, calling it "political terrorism." Nelson's spokesman flatly denied the accusation, accusing Ireland of trying to pump up a campaign that trails in money and name recognition. Indeed, Nelson had raised five times the amount of money that Ireland had by early October.

Ireland also accused Nelson of taking $84,000 in illegal campaign funds, allegedly acquired during the week before the September 8, 1994 primary, which was prohibited. Nelson campaign manager Brian May claimed that the money was raised before September 1, 1994, but computer problems caused the contributions to be reported after the date. Nelson did not return the money.

=== Results ===
1994 Florida Treasurer election
Party	Candidate	Votes	%	±%
Democratic	Bill Nelson	2,070,604	51.70%	
Republican	Tim Ireland	1,933,570	48.28%	
Democratic gain from Republican		Swing		
